= 1986 in the United States =

- Decades: 1960s; 1970s; 1980s; 1990s; 2000s
- See also: History of the United States (1980–1991); Timeline of United States history (1970–1989); List of years in the United States

Events from the year 1986 in the United States.

== Incumbents ==
=== Federal government ===
- President: Ronald Reagan (R-California)
- Vice President: George H. W. Bush (R-Texas)
- Chief Justice:

Warren E. Burger (Virginia) (until September 26)
William Rehnquist (Virginia) (starting September 26)

- Speaker of the House of Representatives: Tip O'Neill (D-Massachusetts)
- Senate Majority Leader: Bob Dole (R-Kansas)
- Congress: 99th

==== State governments ====
Governors and lieutenant governors

=== Governors ===
- Governor of Alabama: George Wallace (Democratic)
- Governor of Alaska: Bill Sheffield (Democratic) (until December 1), Steve Cowper (Democratic) (starting December 1)
- Governor of Arizona: Bruce Babbitt (Democratic)
- Governor of Arkansas: Bill Clinton (Democratic)
- Governor of California: George Deukmejian (Republican)
- Governor of Colorado: Richard Lamm (Democratic)
- Governor of Connecticut: William A O'Neill (Democratic)
- Governor of Delaware: Michael Castle (Republican)
- Governor of Florida: Bob Graham (Democratic)
- Governor of Georgia: Joe Frank Harris (Democratic)
- Governor of Hawaii: George Ariyoshi (Democratic) (until December 1), John D. Waihee III (Democratic) (starting December 1)
- Governor of Idaho: John V. Evans (Democratic)
- Governor of Illinois: James R. Thompson (Republican)
- Governor of Indiana: Robert D. Orr (Republican)
- Governor of Iowa: Terry E. Branstad (Republican)
- Governor of Kansas: John W. Carlin (Democratic)
- Governor of Kentucky: Martha Layne Collins (Democratic)
- Governor of Louisiana: Edwin W. Edwards (Democratic)
- Governor of Maine: Joseph E. Brennan (Democratic)
- Governor of Maryland: Harry R. Hughes (Democratic)
- Governor of Massachusetts: Michael Dukakis (Democratic)
- Governor of Michigan: James Blanchard (Democratic)
- Governor of Minnesota: Rudy Perpich (Democratic)
- Governor of Mississippi: William Allain (Democratic)
- Governor of Missouri: John Ashcroft (Republican)
- Governor of Montana: Ted Schwinden (Democratic)
- Governor of Nebraska: Bob Kerrey (Democratic)
- Governor of Nevada: Richard Bryan (Democratic)
- Governor of New Hampshire: John H. Sununu (Republican)
- Governor of New Jersey: Thomas Kean (Republican)
- Governor of New Mexico: Toney Anaya (Democratic)
- Governor of New York: Mario Cuomo (Democratic)
- Governor of North Carolina: James G. Martin (Republican)
- Governor of North Dakota: George A. Sinner (Democratic)
- Governor of Ohio: Dick Celeste (Democratic)
- Governor of Oklahoma: George Nigh (Democratic)
- Governor of Oregon: Victor G. Atiyeh (Republican)
- Governor of Pennsylvania: Dick Thornburgh (Republican)
- Governor of Rhode Island: Edward D. DiPrete (Republican)
- Governor of South Carolina: Richard Riley (Democratic)
- Governor of South Dakota: Bill Janklow (Republican)
- Governor of Tennessee: Lamar Alexander (Republican)
- Governor of Texas: Mark White (Democratic)
- Governor of Utah: Norman H. Bangerter (Republican)
- Governor of Vermont: Madeleine M. Kunin (Democratic)
- Governor of Virginia: Chuck Robb (Democratic) (until January 18), Gerald L. Baliles (Democratic) (starting January 18)
- Governor of Washington: Booth Gardner (Democratic)
- Governor of West Virginia: Arch A. Moore Jr. (Republican)
- Governor of Wisconsin: Tony Earl (Democratic)
- Governor of Wyoming: Edgar J. Herschler (Democratic)

=== Lieutenant governors ===
- Lieutenant Governor of Alabama: Bill Baxley (Democratic)
- Lieutenant Governor of Alaska: Stephen McAlpine (Democratic)
- Lieutenant Governor of Arkansas: Winston Bryant (Democratic)
- Lieutenant Governor of California: Leo T. McCarthy (Democratic)
- Lieutenant Governor of Colorado: Nancy Dick (Democratic)
- Lieutenant Governor of Connecticut: Joseph J. Fauliso (Democratic)
- Lieutenant Governor of Delaware: Shien Biau Woo (Democratic)
- Lieutenant Governor of Florida: Wayne Mixson (Democratic)
- Lieutenant Governor of Georgia: Zell Miller (Democratic)
- Lieutenant Governor of Hawaii: John D. Waihee III (Democratic) (until December 2), Ben Cayetano (Democratic) (starting December 2)
- Lieutenant Governor of Idaho: David H. Leroy (Republican)
- Lieutenant Governor of Illinois: George H. Ryan (Republican)
- Lieutenant Governor of Indiana: John Mutz (Republican)
- Lieutenant Governor of Iowa: Robert T. Anderson (Democratic)
- Lieutenant Governor of Kansas: Thomas R. Docking (Democratic)
- Lieutenant Governor of Kentucky: Steve Beshear (Democratic)
- Lieutenant Governor of Louisiana: Robert "Bobby" Freeman (Democratic)
- Lieutenant Governor of Maryland: J. Joseph Curran (Democratic)
- Lieutenant Governor of Massachusetts: vacant
- Lieutenant Governor of Michigan: Martha W. Griffiths (Democratic)
- Lieutenant Governor of Minnesota: Marlene Johnson (Democratic)
- Lieutenant Governor of Mississippi: Brad Dye (Democratic)
- Lieutenant Governor of Missouri: Harriett Woods (Democratic)
- Lieutenant Governor of Montana: George Turman (Democratic)
- Lieutenant Governor of Nebraska: Donald F. McGinley (Democratic)
- Lieutenant Governor of Nevada: Bob Cashell (Democratic)
- Lieutenant Governor of New Mexico: Mike Runnels (Democratic)
- Lieutenant Governor of New York: Warren M. Anderson (Republican) (until end of December 31)
- Lieutenant Governor of North Carolina: Robert B. Jordan, III (Democratic)
- Lieutenant Governor of North Dakota: Ruth Meiers (Democratic)
- Lieutenant Governor of Ohio: vacant
- Lieutenant Governor of Oklahoma: Spencer Bernard (Democratic)
- Lieutenant Governor of Pennsylvania: William Scranton, III (Republican)
- Lieutenant Governor of Rhode Island: Richard A. Licht (Democratic)
- Lieutenant Governor of South Carolina: Michael R. Daniel (Democratic)
- Lieutenant Governor of South Dakota: Lowell C. Hansen II (Republican)
- Lieutenant Governor of Tennessee: John S. Wilder (Democratic)
- Lieutenant Governor of Texas: William P. Hobby Jr. (Democratic)
- Lieutenant Governor of Utah: W. Val Oveson (Republican)
- Lieutenant Governor of Vermont: Peter Plympton Smith (Republican)
- Lieutenant Governor of Virginia: Richard Joseph Davis (Democratic) (until January 18), Douglas Wilder (Democratic) (starting January 18)
- Lieutenant Governor of Washington: John Cherberg (Democratic)
- Lieutenant Governor of Wisconsin: James Flynn (Democratic)

== Events ==
=== January ===
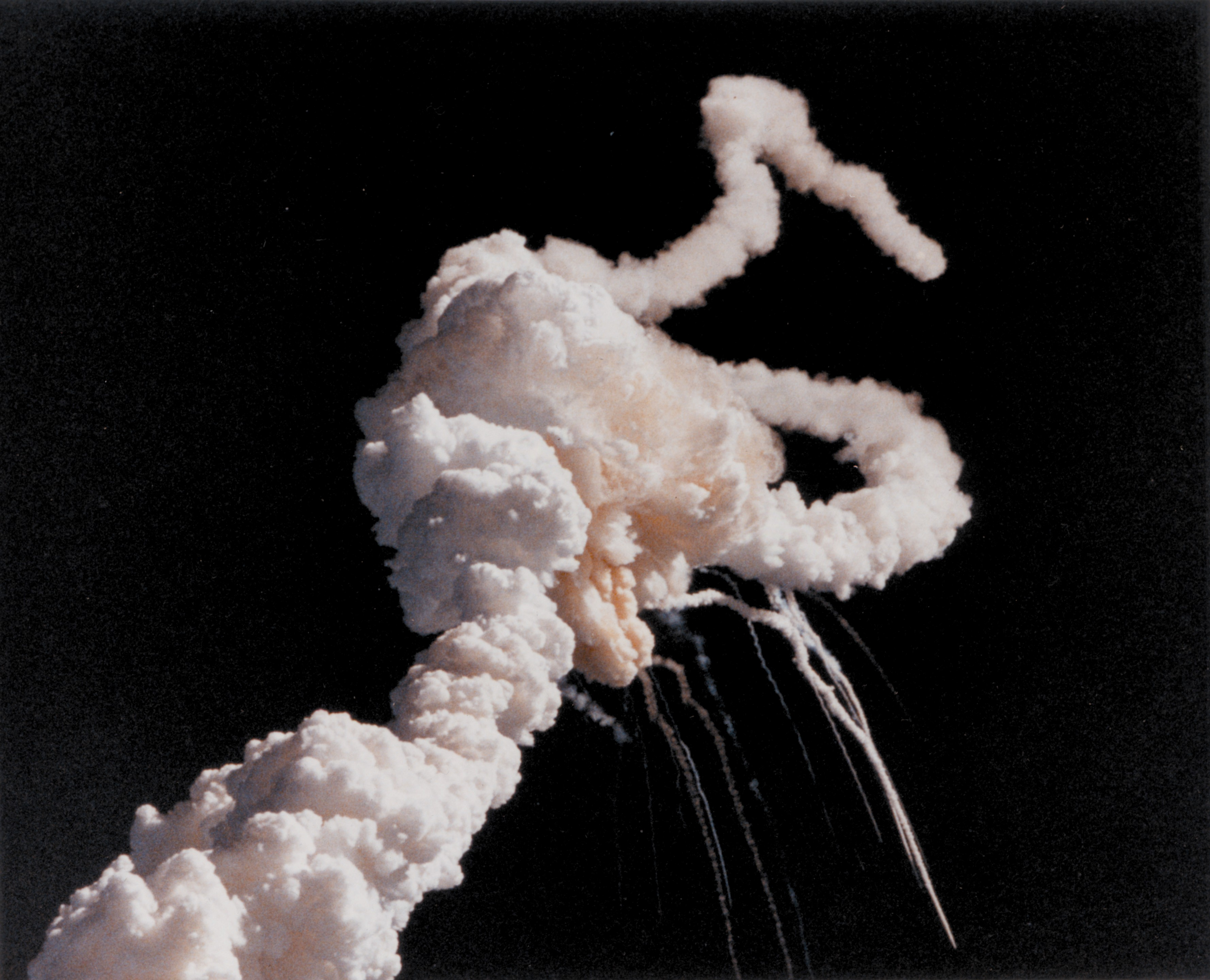
January 28: Space Shuttle Challenger disaster

- January 12 – STS-61-C: Space Shuttle Columbia is launched with the first Hispanic-American astronaut, Dr. Franklin Chang Díaz.
- January 20 – The first federal Martin Luther King Jr. Day, honoring Martin Luther King Jr., is observed.
- January 23 – The first group of artists are inducted into the Rock and Roll Hall of Fame, which included Elvis Presley, James Brown, Little Richard, Fats Domino, Ray Charles, Chuck Berry, Sam Cooke, the Everly Brothers, Buddy Holly, and Jerry Lee Lewis.
- January 24 – The Voyager 2 space probe makes its first encounter with Uranus.
- January 26 – Super Bowl XX: The Chicago Bears defeat the New England Patriots 46–10 at the Louisiana Superdome in New Orleans, Louisiana.
- January 28
  - STS-51-L: Space Shuttle Challenger disintegrates 73 seconds after launch, killing the crew of seven astronauts, including schoolteacher Christa McAuliffe (see Space Shuttle Challenger disaster).
  - President Ronald Reagan postpones for one week the State of the Union address that had been scheduled for the evening and instead addresses the nation on the Challenger disaster.
- January 31 – Two earthquakes (5.0 M_{w} and 4.4 M_{w}) affected northeastern Ohio causing minor damage and 17 injuries. The shocks in this doublet earthquake occurred almost six hours apart with both having a maximum Mercalli intensity of VI (Strong).

=== February ===
- February 4 – President Reagan delivers his fifth State of the Union Address.
- February 19 – After waiting 37 years, the United States Senate approves a treaty outlawing genocide.
- February 25 – People Power Revolution: President Ferdinand Marcos of the Philippines goes into exile in Hawaii after 20 years of rule; Corazon Aquino becomes the first Filipino woman president, first as an interim president. Salvador Laurel becomes her vice president.
- February 27 – The United States Senate allows its debates to be televised on a trial basis.

=== March ===
- Halley's Comet reaches the closest point to the Earth during its second visit to the Solar System in the 20th century. The next time it will be seen is predicted for 2061.
- March 9 – United States Navy divers find the largely intact but heavily damaged crew compartment of the Space Shuttle Challenger; the bodies of all seven astronauts are still inside.
- March 24 – The 58th Academy Awards, hosted by Alan Alda, Jane Fonda and Robin Williams, are held at Dorothy Chandler Pavilion in Los Angeles, with Sydney Pollack's Out of Africa winning Best Picture, Best Director and five other awards out of 11 nominations. The film is tied in nominations by Steven Spielberg's The Color Purple.
- March 26 – An article in The New York Times charges that Kurt Waldheim, former United Nations Secretary General and candidate for president of Austria, may have been involved in Nazi war crimes during World War II.

=== April ===
- April 5 – 1986 West Berlin discotheque bombing: The West Berlin discothèque, a known hangout for United States soldiers, is bombed, killing three and injuring 230; Libya is held responsible.
- April 7 – The World Wrestling Federation holds WrestleMania 2 from three different venues: the Nassau Veterans Memorial Coliseum in Uniondale, New York, the Rosemont Horizon in Rosemont, Illinois, and the Los Angeles Memorial Sports Arena in Los Angeles, California.
- April 11 - 1986 Miami FBI Shootout: 2 Gunmen cause a shootout in Miami, in five minutes, 4 people, including both perpetrators and 2 FBI agents, were killed
- April 15 – Operation El Dorado Canyon: At least 15 people die after United States planes bomb targets in the Libyan capital, Tripoli, and the Benghazi region.
- April 17 – British journalist John McCarthy is kidnapped in Beirut (released in August 1991) and three others are found dead; Revolutionary Cells (RZ) claims responsibility in retaliation for the U.S. bombing of Libya.
- April 29
  - Roger Clemens sets the record for the most strikeouts in a 9-inning Major League Baseball game, striking out 20 batters.
  - A major fire at Los Angeles Public Library caused by arson destroys 400,000 volumes.

=== May ===
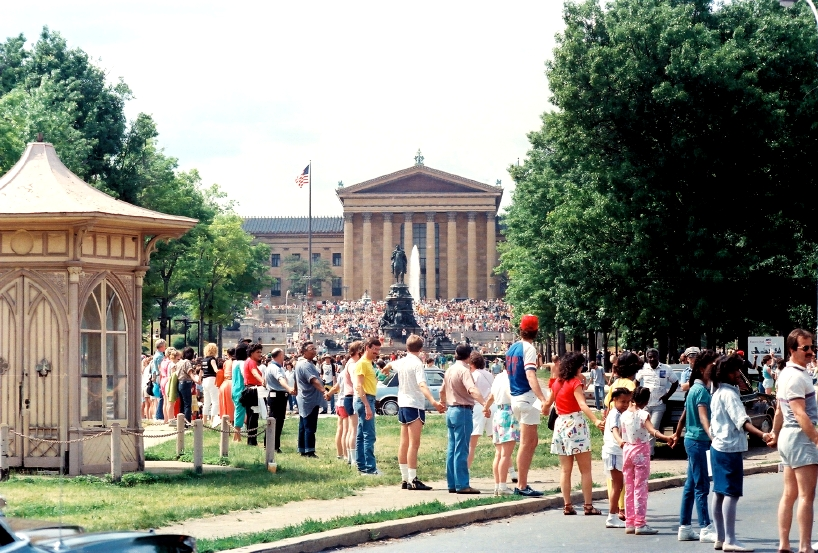
May 25: Hands Across America

- May 9 – The first victim of serial killer John Wayne Gacy who hadn't been seen alive for 14 years is identified as 16-year-old Timothy McCoy of Omaha, Nebraska, who disappeared January 2, 1972 after encountering Gacy in Chicago, Illinois, and was killed the next morning.
- May 16 – Top Gun, an action film featuring naval aviation and starring Tom Cruise, Anthony Edwards, Val Kilmer and Kelly McGillis, debuts in cinemas. It goes on to become the highest-grossing film of the year, netting nearly $177 million in America alone.
- May 25 – Hands Across America: approximately 6.5 million people form a human chain from New York City to Long Beach, California, to raise money to fight hunger and homelessness.

=== June ===
- June 4 – Jonathan Pollard pleads guilty to espionage for selling top secret United States military intelligence to Israel.
- June 5–11 – Excedrin cyanide tampering crisis (see Stella Nickell).
- June 8 – The Boston Celtics defeat the Houston Rockets in six games to win the NBA Championship.
- June 9 – The Rogers Commission Report is released on the Space Shuttle Challenger disaster.
- June 19 – American college basketball player Len Bias suffers a fatal cardiac arrhythmia from a cocaine overdose less than 48 hours after being selected 2nd overall by the Boston Celtics in the 1986 NBA draft.

=== July ===
- July 5 – The Statue of Liberty is reopened to the public after an extensive refurbishing.
- July 8 – The 6.0 M_{w} North Palm Springs earthquake shook Southern California with a maximum Mercalli intensity of VII (Very strong), causing 29–40 injuries and $4.5–6 million in losses.
- July 13 – The 5.8 M_{w} Oceanside earthquake shook the south coast of California with a maximum Mercalli intensity of VI (Strong), causing $700,000 in losses and one death.
- July 21 – The 6.2 M_{w} Chalfant Valley earthquake shook eastern California with a maximum Mercalli intensity of VI (Strong), causing $2.7 million in losses and two injuries.

=== August ===
- August 6 – In Louisville, Kentucky, William J. Schroeder, the second artificial heart recipient, dies after 620 days.
- August 20 – In Edmond, Oklahoma, United States Postal Service employee Patrick Sherrill guns down 14 of his co-workers before committing suicide.
- August 31
  - Aeroméxico Flight 498, a Douglas DC-9, collides with a Piper PA-28 over Cerritos, California, killing 67 on both aircraft and 15 on the ground.
  - The cargo ship Khian Sea departs from the docks of Philadelphia, Pennsylvania, carrying 14,000 tons of toxic waste. It wanders the seas for the next 16 months trying to find a place to dump its cargo.

=== September ===
- September 5 – Pan Am Flight 73, a flight from Bombay, India, to John F. Kennedy Airport in New York, is hijacked. Twenty-one people are killed during the hijacking, including nationals from India, the United States, Pakistan, and Mexico.

=== October ===
- October 1 – U.S. President Ronald Reagan signs the Goldwater–Nichols Act into law, making official the largest reorganization of the United States Department of Defense since the Air Force was made a separate branch of service in 1947.
- October 9
  - United States District Court Judge Harry E. Claiborne becomes the fifth federal official to be removed from office through impeachment.
  - The Fox Broadcasting Company (then abbreviated as FBC; now Fox) launches as the United States' fourth commercial broadcast television network, the first such attempt since 1967.
- October 11 – Cold War: Ronald Reagan and Soviet leader Mikhail Gorbachev meet in Reykjavík, Iceland, to continue discussions about scaling back their intermediate missile arsenals in Europe (the talks break down in failure).
- October 22 – In New York City, WNBC Radio's traffic helicopter crashes into the Hudson River, killing traffic reporter Jane Dornacker. The last words heard on-the-air were Dornacker's screams of terror, "Hit the water! Hit the water! Hit the water!"
- October 27
  - World Series: The New York Mets defeat the Boston Red Sox in 7 games. This is the second world series title in the Mets franchise. It is also remembered for Game 6, when Bill Buckner lets an easy ground ball hit by Mookie Wilson roll through his legs, letting the Mets win and pull even with the Red Sox in the series.
  - Great Basin National Park is established.
- October 28 – The centennial of the Statue of Liberty's dedication is celebrated in New York Harbor.

=== November ===
- November 3 – Iran–Contra affair: The Lebanese magazine Ash-Shiraa reports that the United States has been selling weapons to Iran in secret, in order to secure the release of seven American hostages held by pro-Iranian groups in Lebanon.
- November 4
  - Democrats regain control of the United States Senate for the first time in six years. In California, Chief Justice Rose Bird and two colleagues are removed by voters from the Supreme Court of California for opposing capital punishment.
  - The Commonwealth of the Northern Mariana Islands officially becomes a territory of the United States.
- November 21 – Iran-Contra Affair: National Security Council member Oliver North and his secretary, Fawn Hall, start shredding documents implicating them in selling weapons to Iran and channeling the proceeds to help fund the Contra rebels in Nicaragua.
- November 22 – Mike Tyson wins his first world boxing title by defeating Trevor Berbick in Las Vegas, becoming the youngest heavyweight champion ever at age 20.
- November 25 – Iran-Contra Affair: U.S. Attorney General Edwin Meese announces that profits from covert weapons sales to Iran were illegally diverted to the anti-communist Contra rebels in Nicaragua.
- November 26 – Iran-Contra Affair: U.S. President Ronald Reagan announces that as of December 1, former Senator John Tower, former Secretary of State Edmund Muskie, and former National Security Adviser Brent Scowcroft will serve as members of the Special Review Board looking into the scandal (they became known as the Tower Commission). Reagan denies involvement in the scandal.

=== December ===
- December – The unemployment rate drops to 6.6%, the lowest since March 1980.
- December 20 – Three African Americans are assaulted by a group of white teens in the Howard Beach neighborhood of Queens, New York. One of the victims, Michael Griffith, is run over and killed by a motorist while attempting to flee the attackers.
- December 26 – After 35 years on the airwaves and holding the title of the longest-running non-news program on network television, NBC airs the final episode of daytime drama Search for Tomorrow.
- December 31 – A fire at the Dupont Plaza Hotel in San Juan, Puerto Rico, kills 97 and injures 140.

=== Ongoing ===
- Cold War (1947–1991)
- Iran–Contra affair (1985–1987)

== Births ==
Those born in the year 1986 are considered millennials (Generation Y or Gen Y).

=== January ===
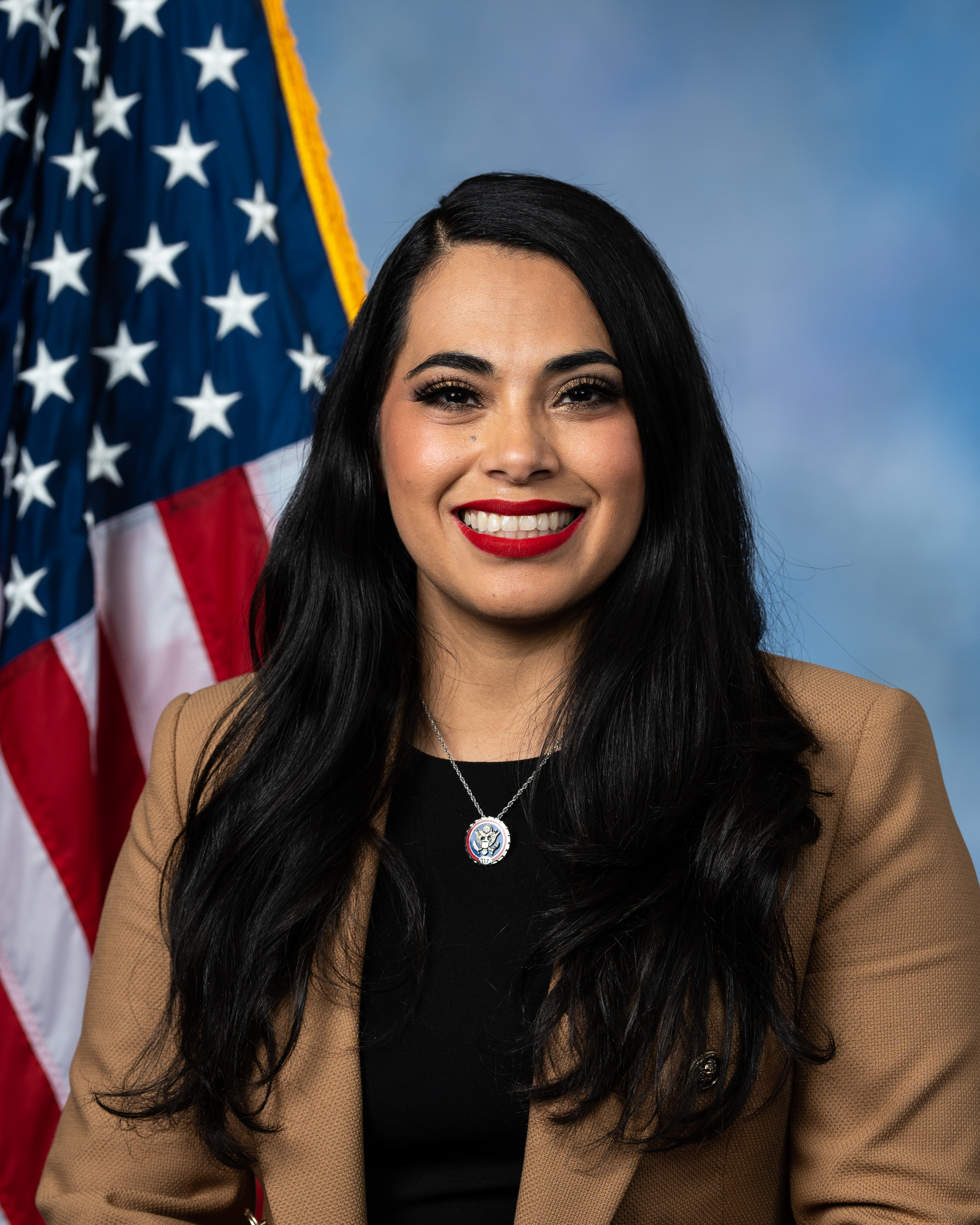
Mayra Flores

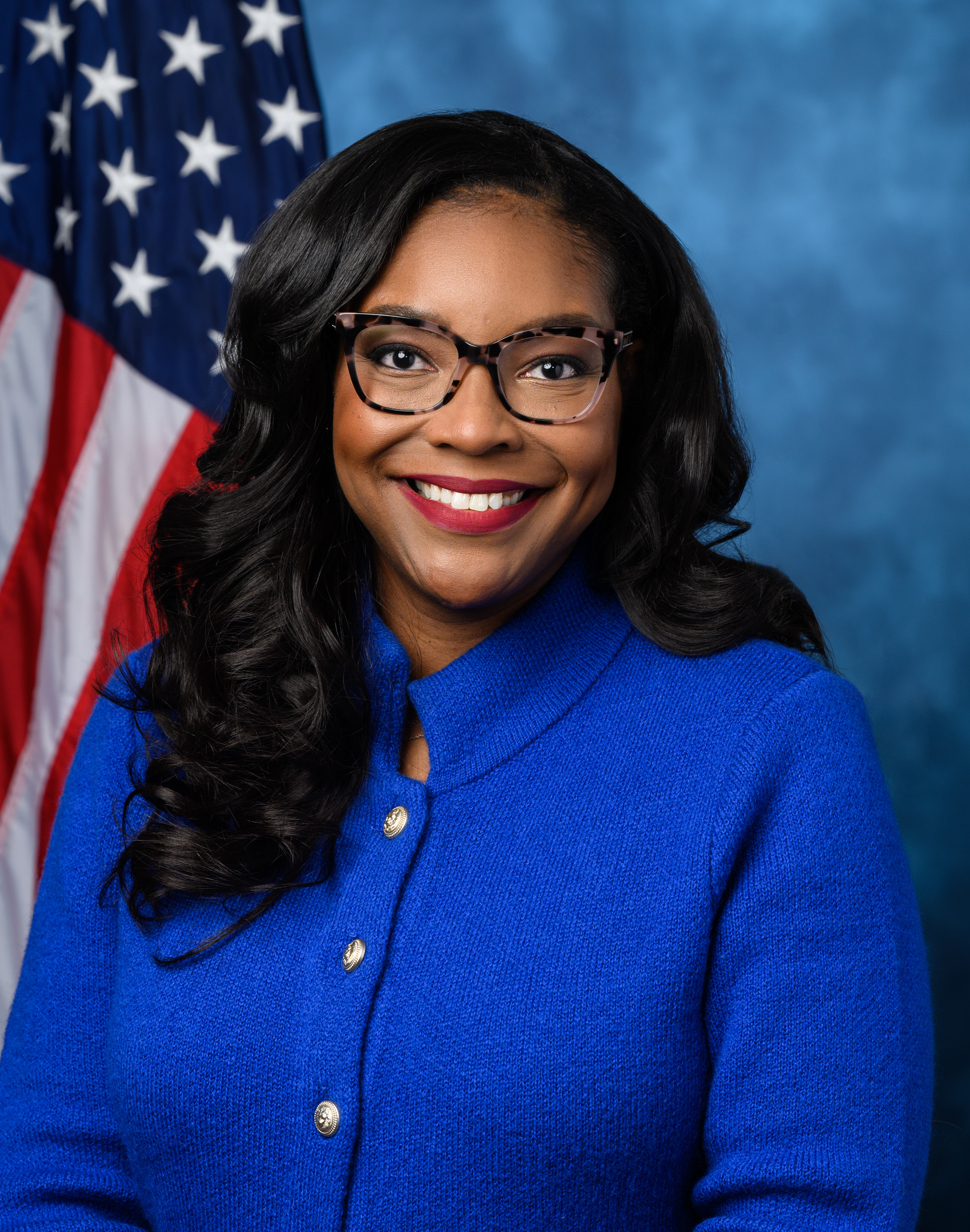
Emilia Sykes

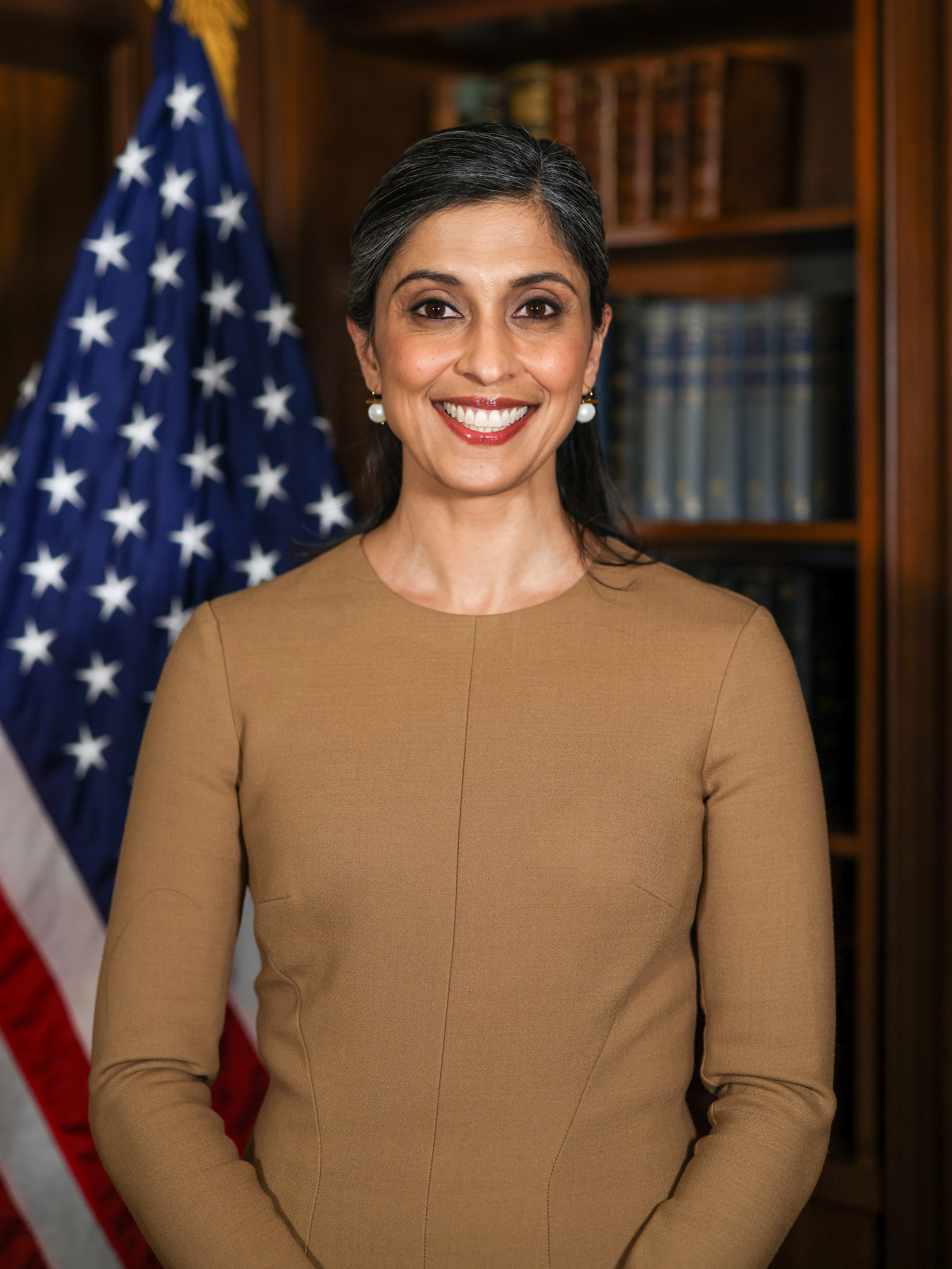
Usha Vance

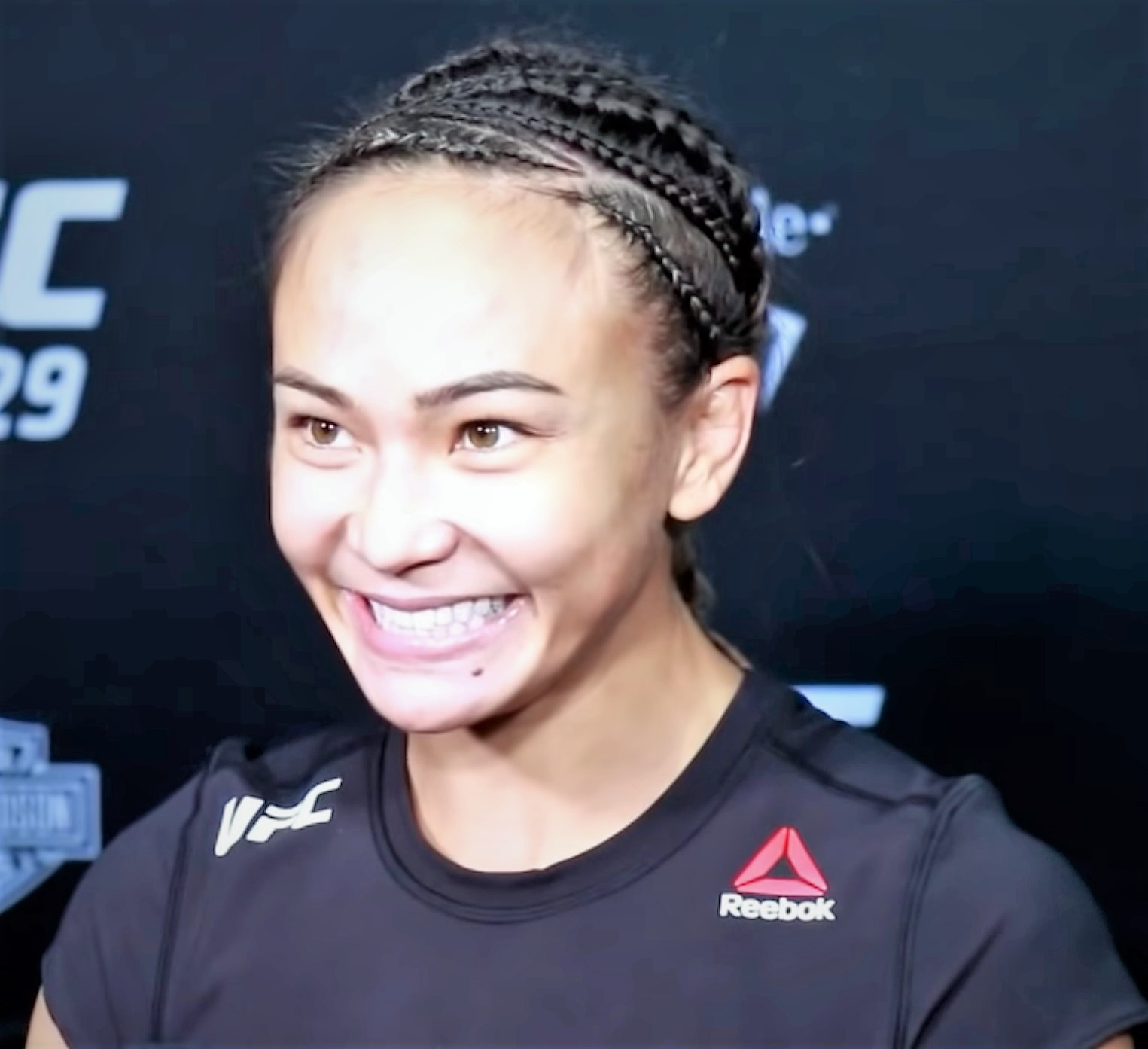
Michelle Waterson

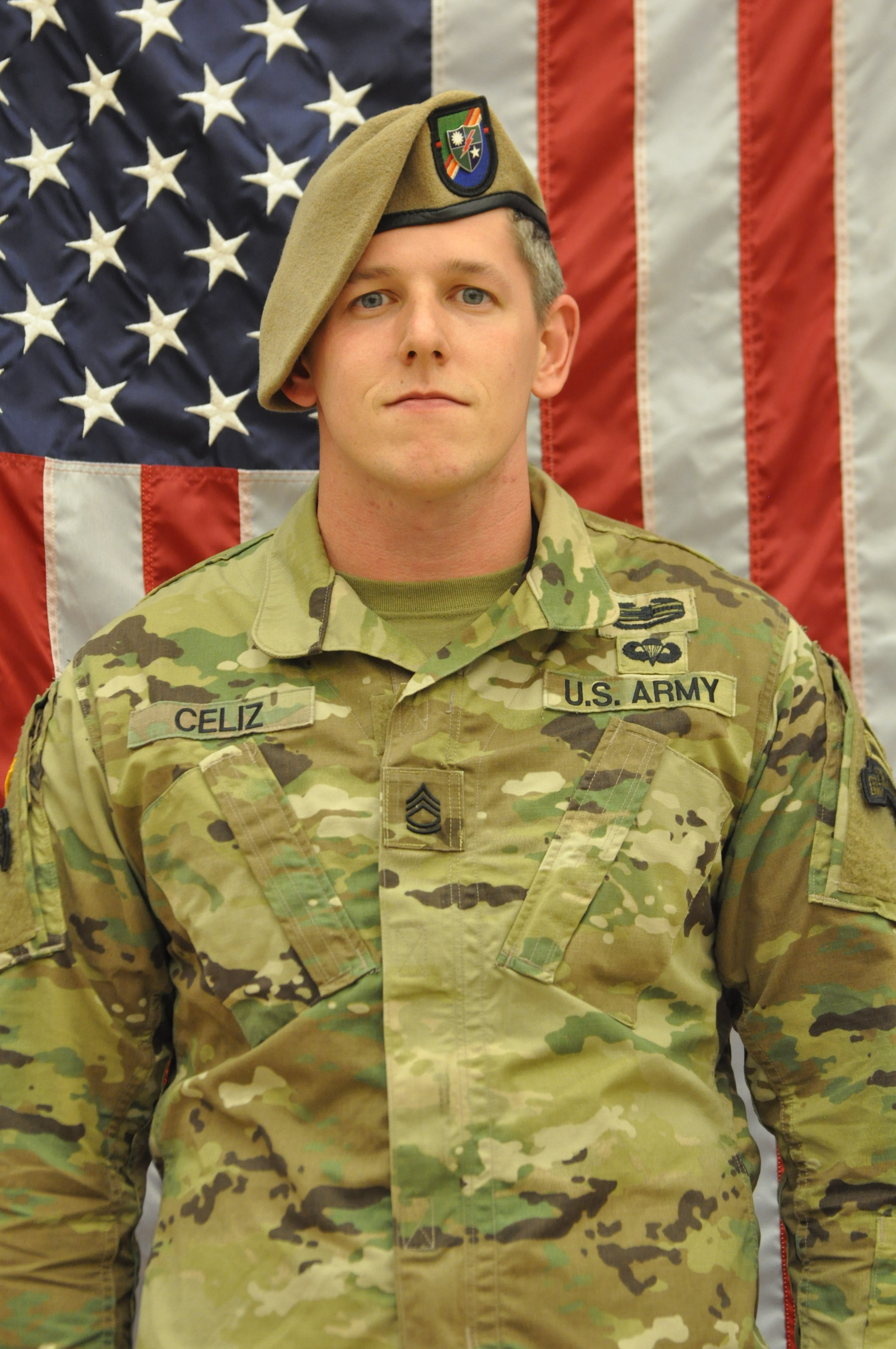
Christopher Celiz

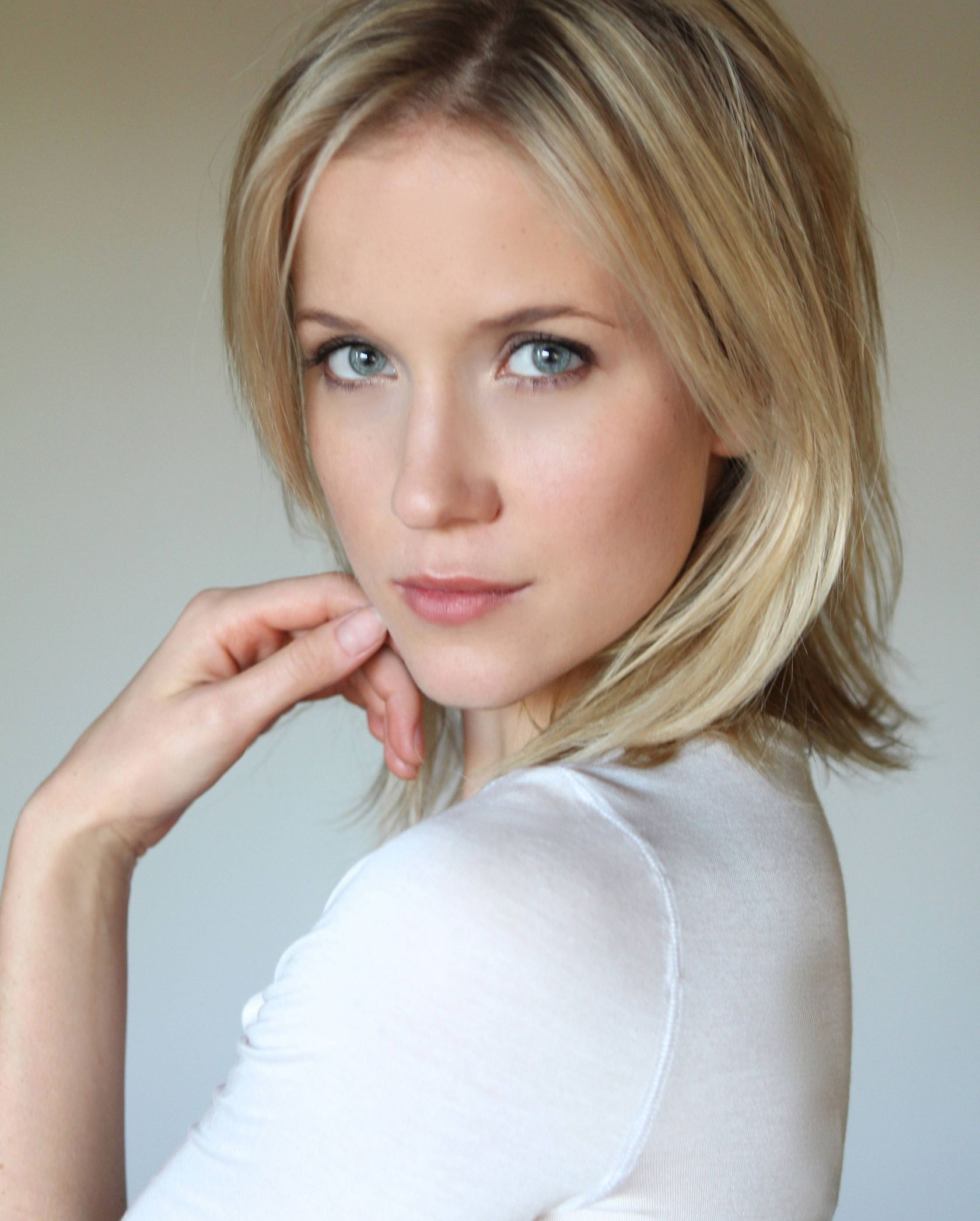
Jessy Schram

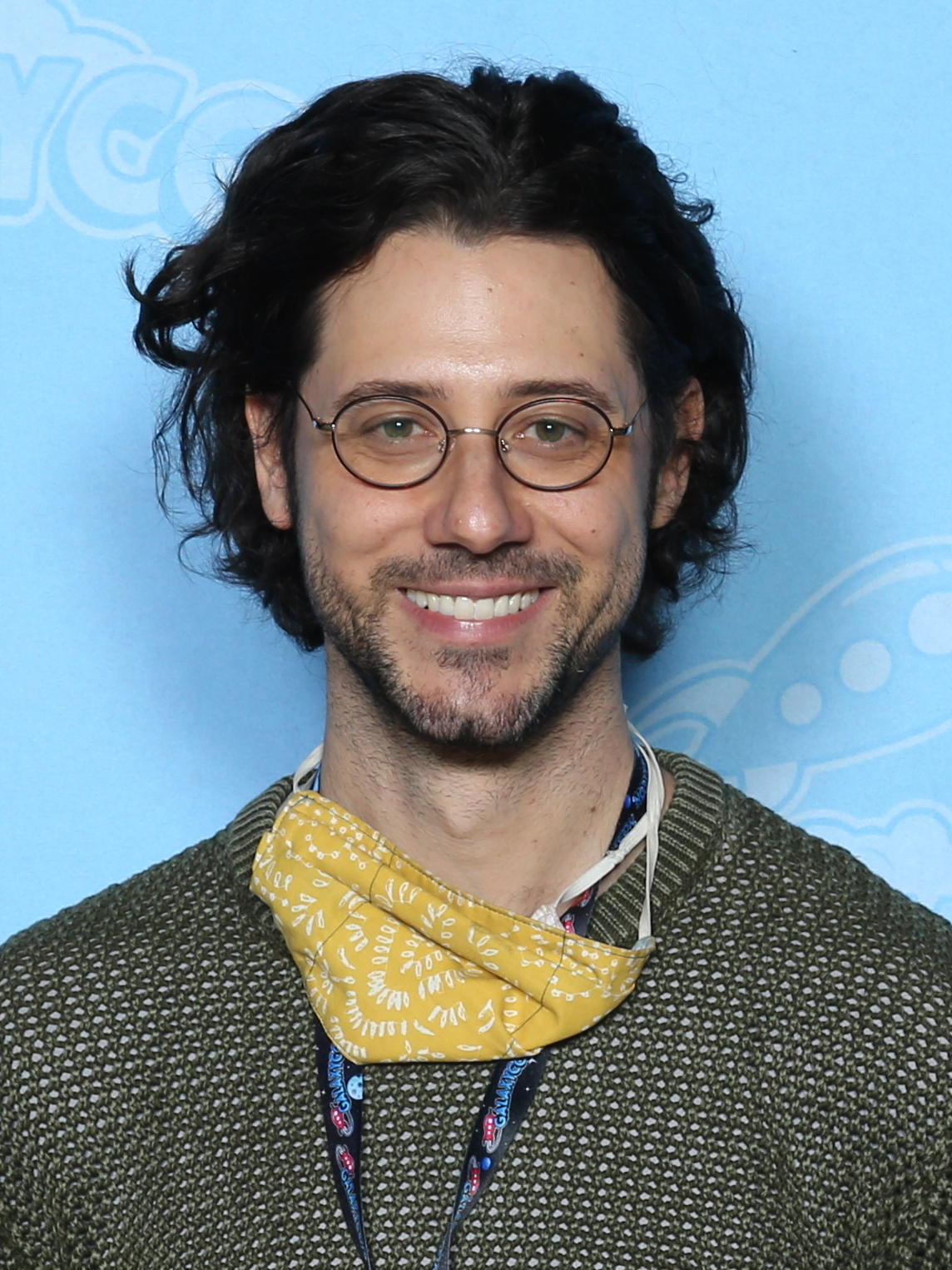
Hale Appleman

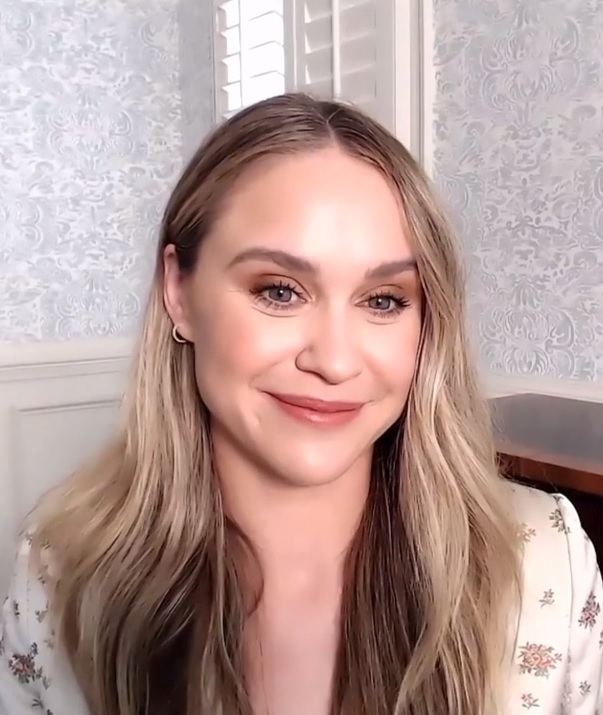
Becca Tobin

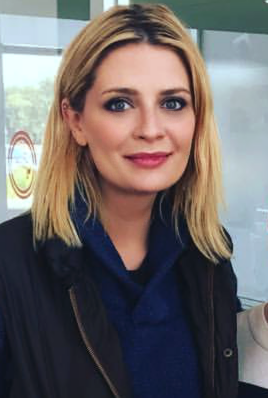
Mischa Barton

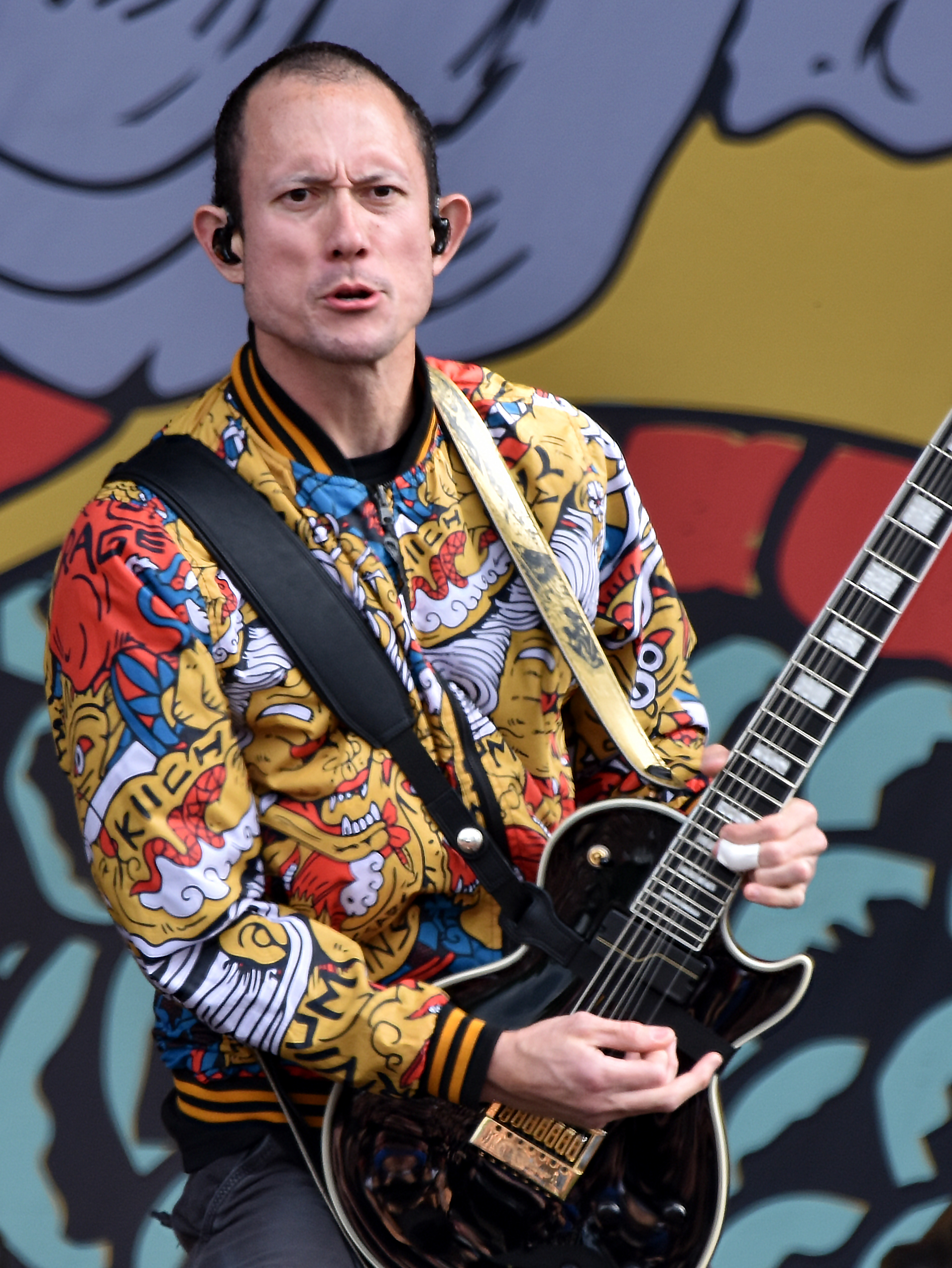
Matt Heafy

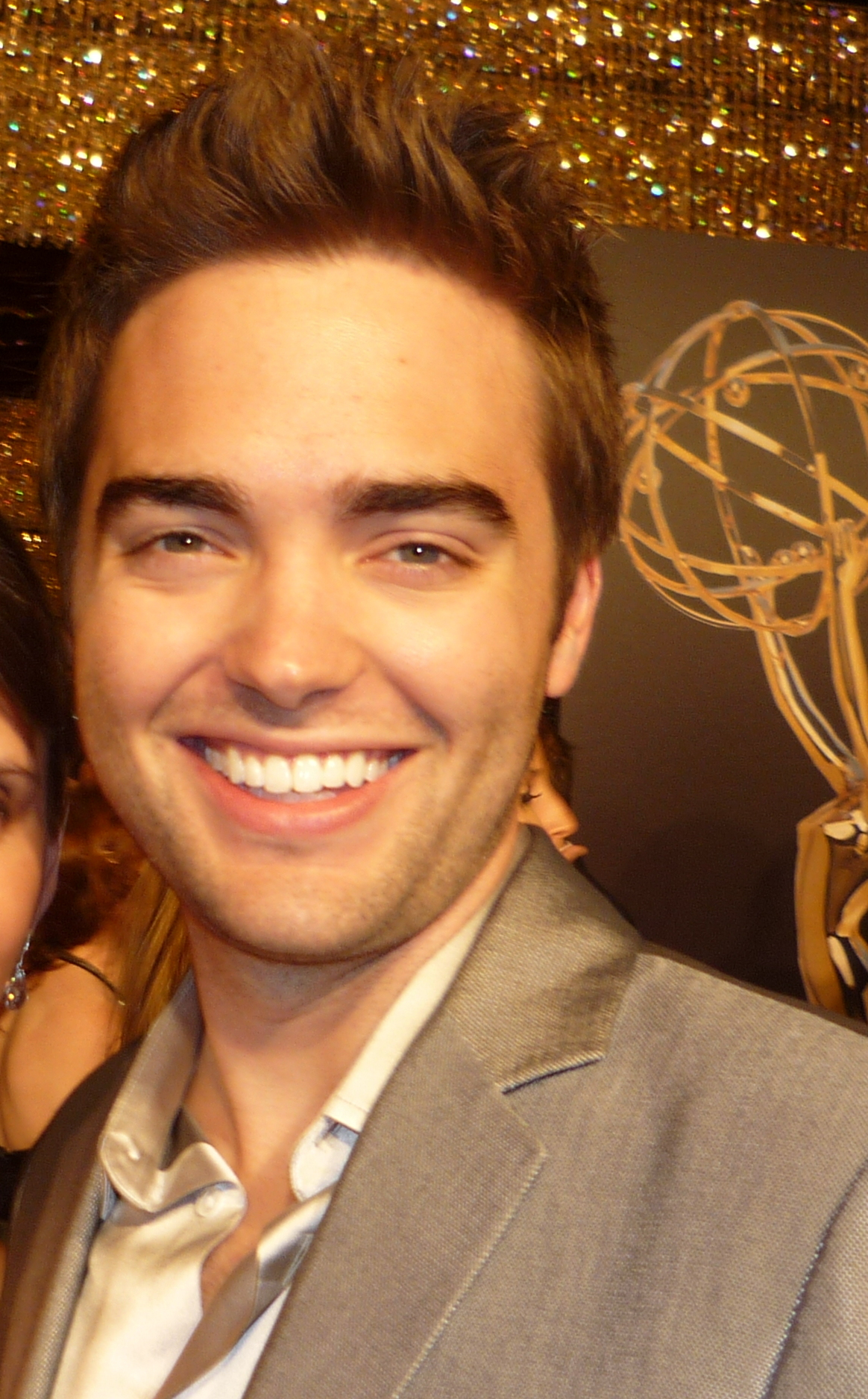
Drew Tyler Bell

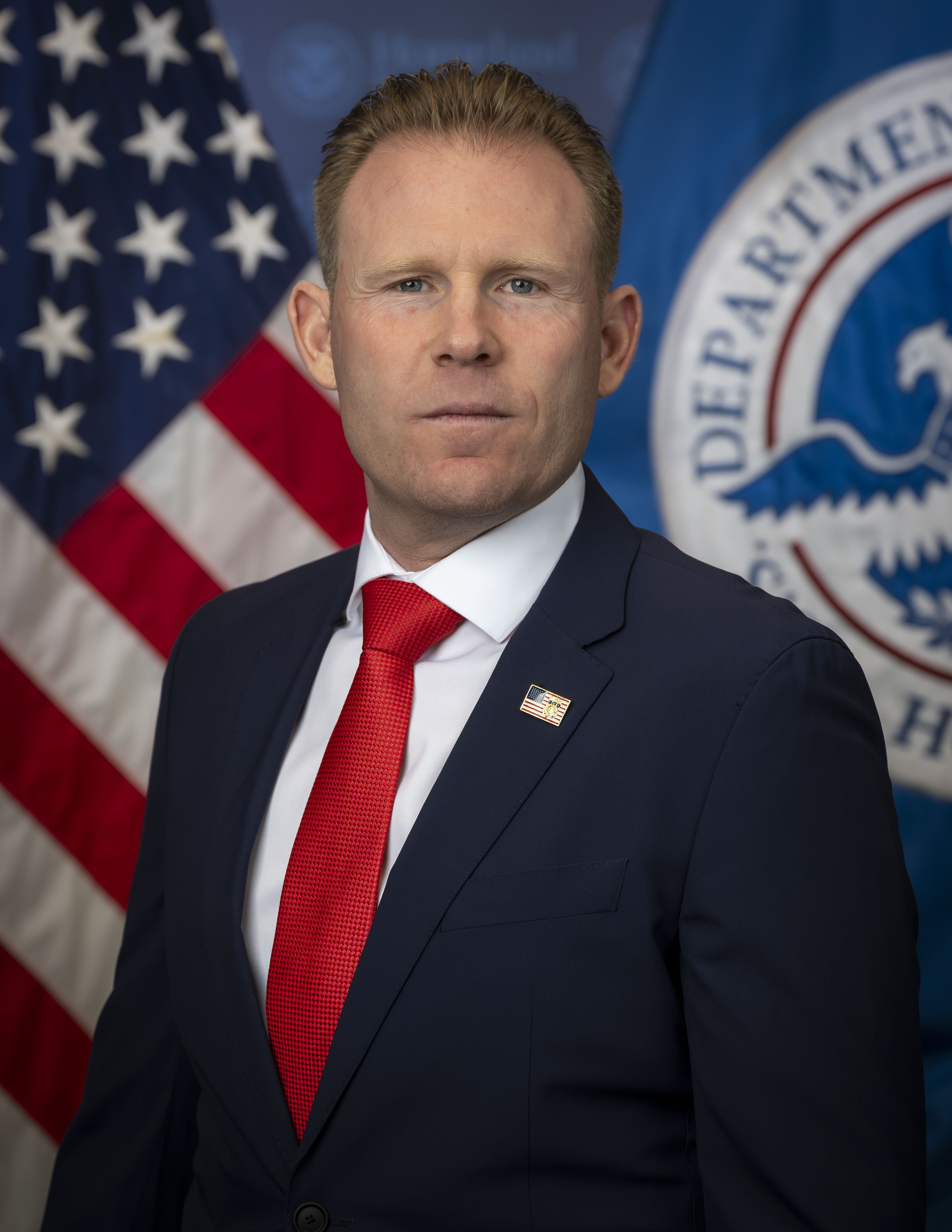
Andrew Giuliani

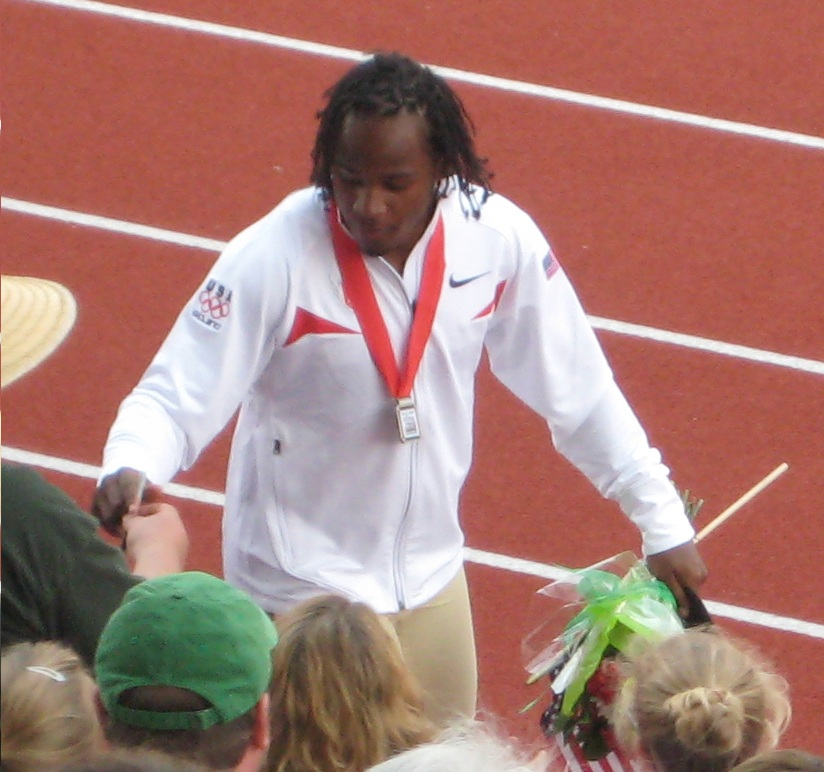
Walter Dix

- January 1
  - Ramses Barden, football player
  - Glen Davis, basketball player
  - Mayra Flores, Mexican-born politician
- January 2
  - Jeff Bauman, author and victim in the Boston Marathon Bombing
  - Scott Burley, football player
  - Trombone Shorty, trumpet player and composer
- January 3
  - Mackenzy Bernadeau, football player
  - Jenn Bostic, Christian and country singer/songwriter
  - Lloyd, urban musician
- January 4
  - Deon Butler, football player
  - Maria Lamb, Olympic speed skater
  - Steve Slaton, football player
  - Emilia Sykes, politician
  - Charlyne Yi, actress
- January 5
  - J. P. Arencibia, baseball player
  - Jesse Draper, talk show host
- January 6
  - Mike Teel, football player
  - Shane Sweet, actor
  - Usha Vance, lawyer and Second Lady, wife of Vice president JD Vance
  - Michelle Waterson, mixed martial artist and model
  - Emoly Ann West, beauty pageant titleholder
- January 7
  - Baby DC, rapper
  - Yummy Bingham, singer/songwriter
  - Ryan Christian, football player
  - JamesOn Curry, basketball player
  - Ramon Foster, football player
- January 8 – Ben Yu, poker player
- January 9 – Jonathan Compas, football player
- January 10
  - Trevor Canfield, football player
  - Marcus Freeman, football player and coach
- January 12
  - Christopher Celiz, U.S. Army sergeant and Medal of Honor recipient (d. 2018)
  - Saikat Chakrabarti, political advisor and software engineer
  - Deena Nicole Cortese, TV personality
- January 13 – Aaron Pixton, Mathematician
- January 14
  - Laurel Abrahamson, volleyball player
  - Gary Brolsma, musician, vlogger, and singer
  - Matt Riddle, wrestler and mixed martial artist
- January 15
  - Andrew Craig, mixed martial artist
  - Glover Quin, football player
  - Jessy Schram, actress
- January 16
  - Reid Brignac, baseball player
  - Gerald Cadogan, football player
  - Mason Gamble, actor
  - Mark Trumbo, baseball player
- January 17
  - Max Adler, actor
  - Hale Appleman, actor
  - Dan Campbell, singer and frontman for The Wonder Years
  - Pamela Council, artist and educator
  - Jeremiah Fraites, musician, composer, songwriter, and multi-instrumentalist
  - Chloe Lattanzi, singer and actress
- January 18
  - Chedda Da Connect, rapper
  - Devin Kelley, actress
  - Eugene Lee Yang, filmmaker, actor and internet celebrity
  - Becca Tobin, actress and singer
- January 19
  - Julian Cyr, politician
  - George Hansel, politician, mayor of Keene, New Hampshire (2020-2024)
  - Sara Mearns, ballerina
- January 20
  - Derek Fathauer, golfer
  - Samuel Kiplimo Kosgei, Kenyan-born long-distance runner (d. 2023)
  - Bryan Lerg, hockey player
- January 21
  - Edson Barboza, mixed martial artist
  - Peyton Hillis, football player
  - Phil Loadholt, football player
  - Jonathan Quick, hockey player
- January 22 – Larry English, football player
- January 23
  - Brandon Broady, comedian, actor, and television host
  - Michael Stevens, YouTuber and educator
- January 24
  - Mischa Barton, British-born actress
  - Michael Brennan, ice hockey player
  - Aimee Carter, author
  - Tyler Flowers, baseball player
  - Jack Hillen, hockey player
  - Vinny Marseglia, wrestler
  - Sean McVay, football coach
- January 25 – Brian McClellan, epic fantasy author
  - Andy Dirks, baseball player
- January 26
  - Kizzmekia Corbett, immunologist
  - Gerald Green, basketball player
  - Matt Heafy, musician and frontman for Trivium
  - Taylor Wilde, wrestler
- January 27
  - Iana Kasian, Ukrainian-born prosecutor and murder victim (d. 2016)
  - Kendall Langford, football player
- January 29
  - Drew Tyler Bell, actor and dancer
  - Michael Blatchford, cyclist
  - Chris Bourque, ice hockey player
  - Sarah Jaffe, singer
  - Todd Peck, stock car racer
- January 30
  - Matt Blumenthal, politician
  - Ashley Buccille, actress
  - Sean Caisse, stock car racing driver
  - Nick Evans, baseball player
  - Andrew Giuliani, political adviser, political candidate, and son of former NYC Mayor Rudy Giuliani
  - Jordan Pacheco, baseball player
- January 31
  - Kyle Altman, soccer player
  - Walter Dix, sprinter

=== February ===
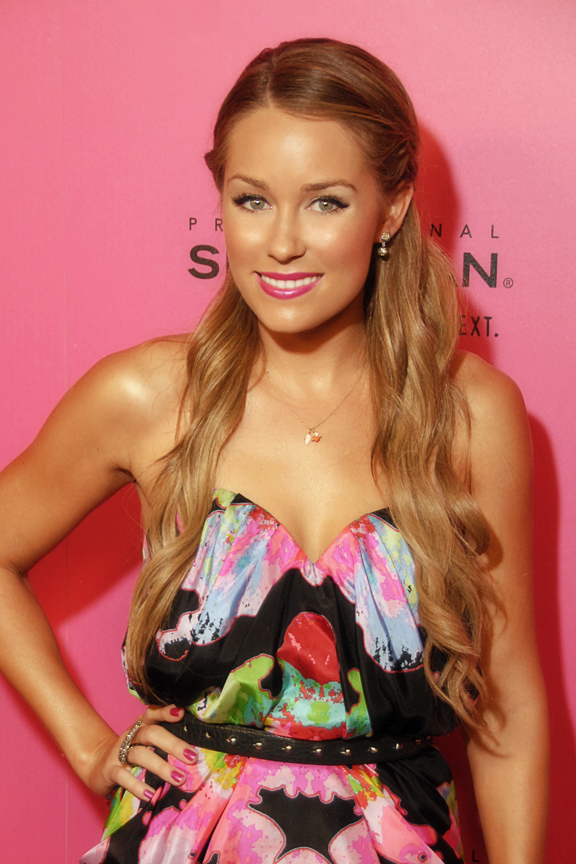
Lauren Conrad

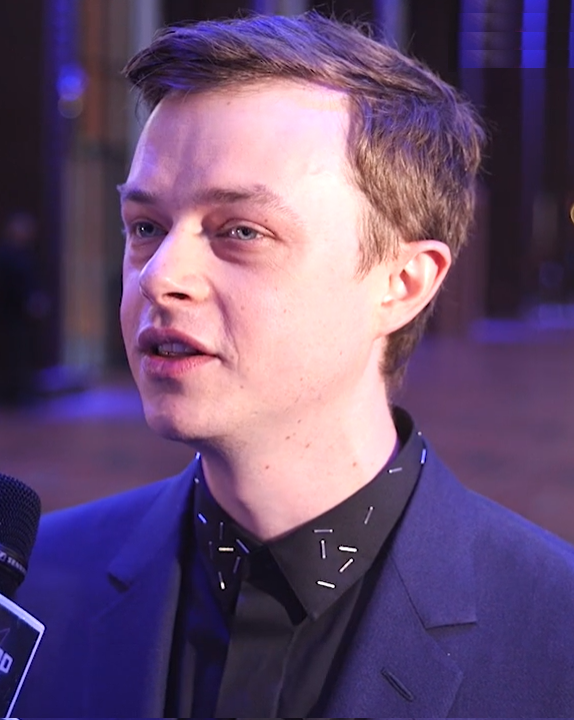
Dane DeHaan

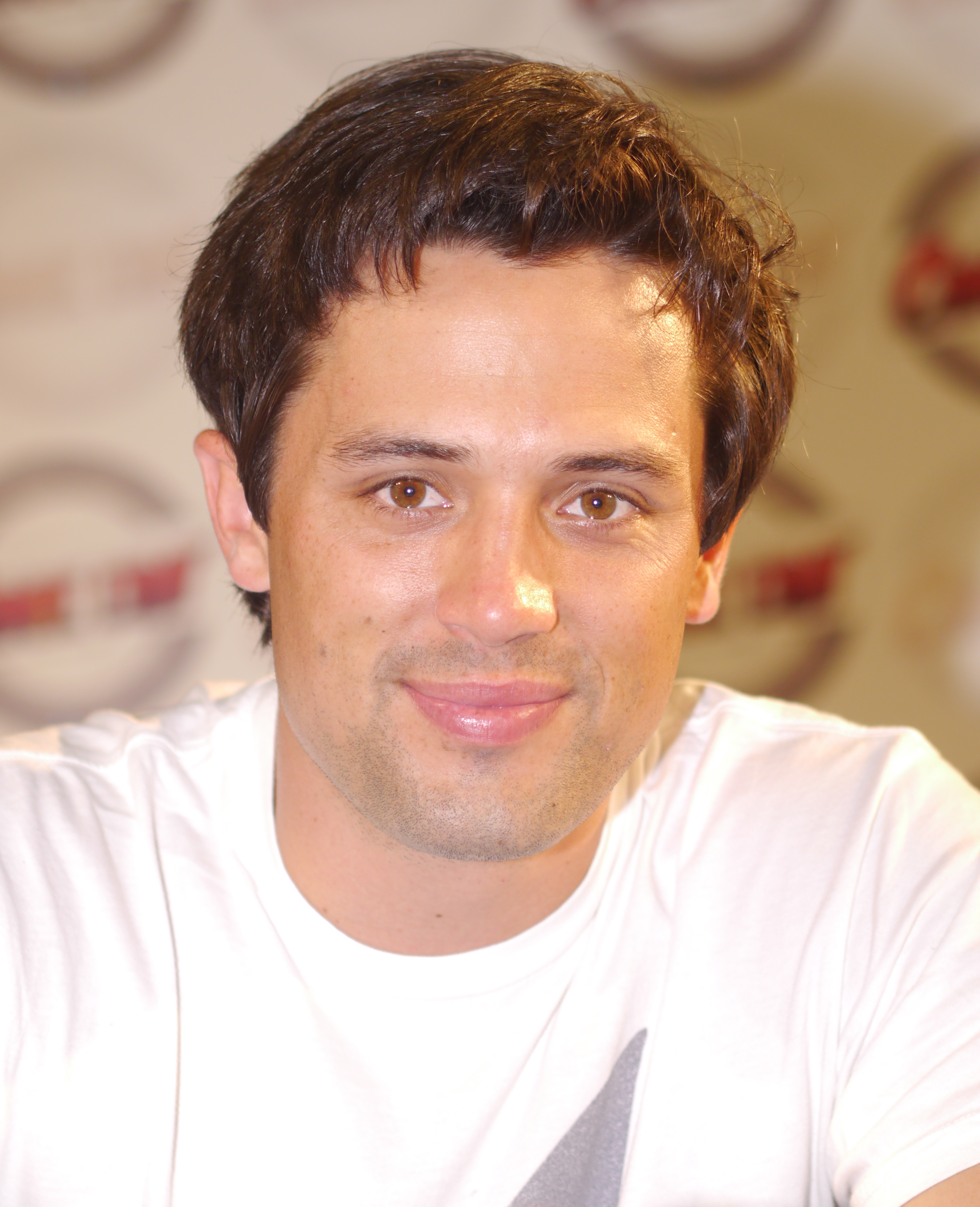
Stephen Colletti

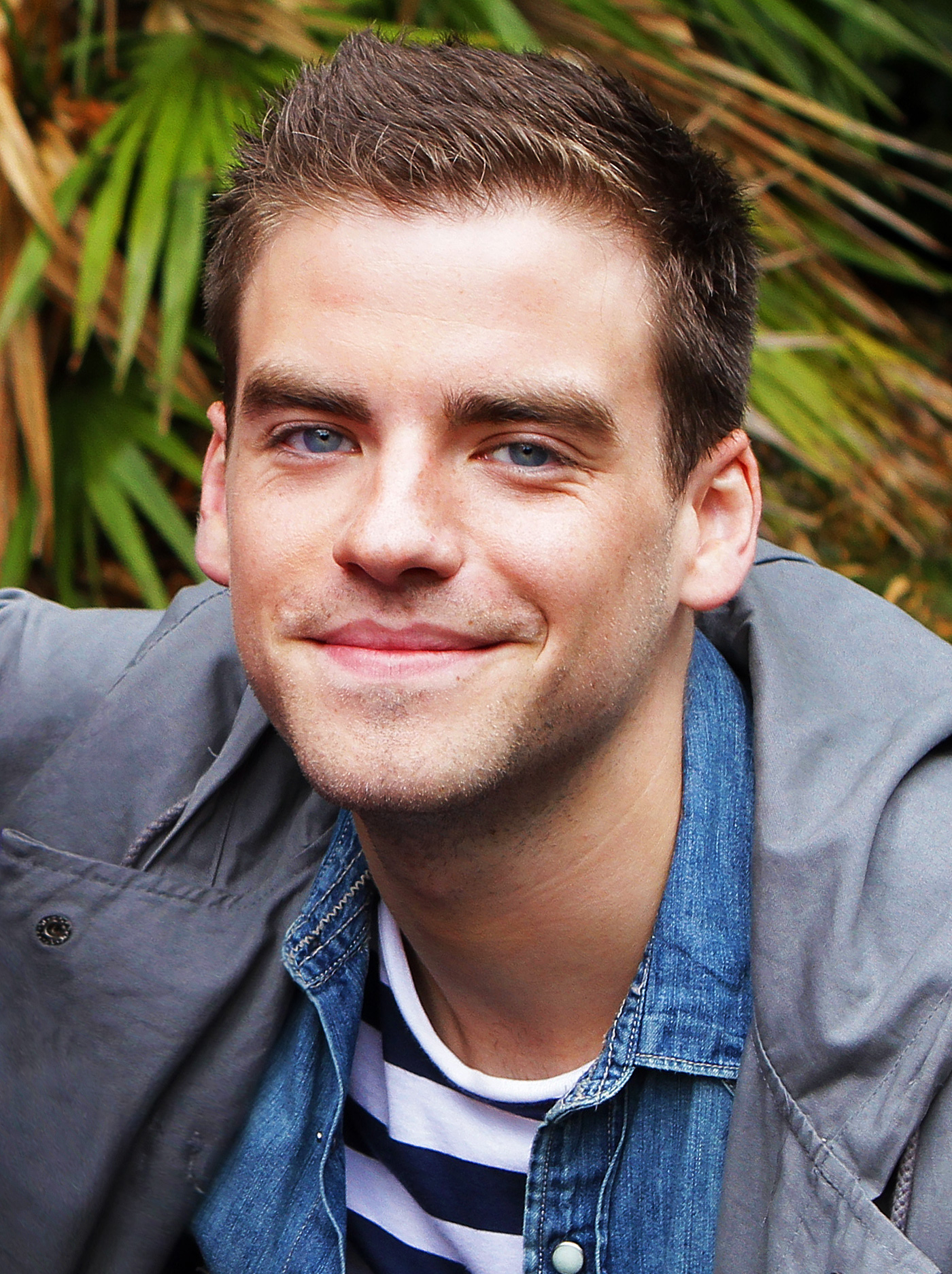
PJ Brennan

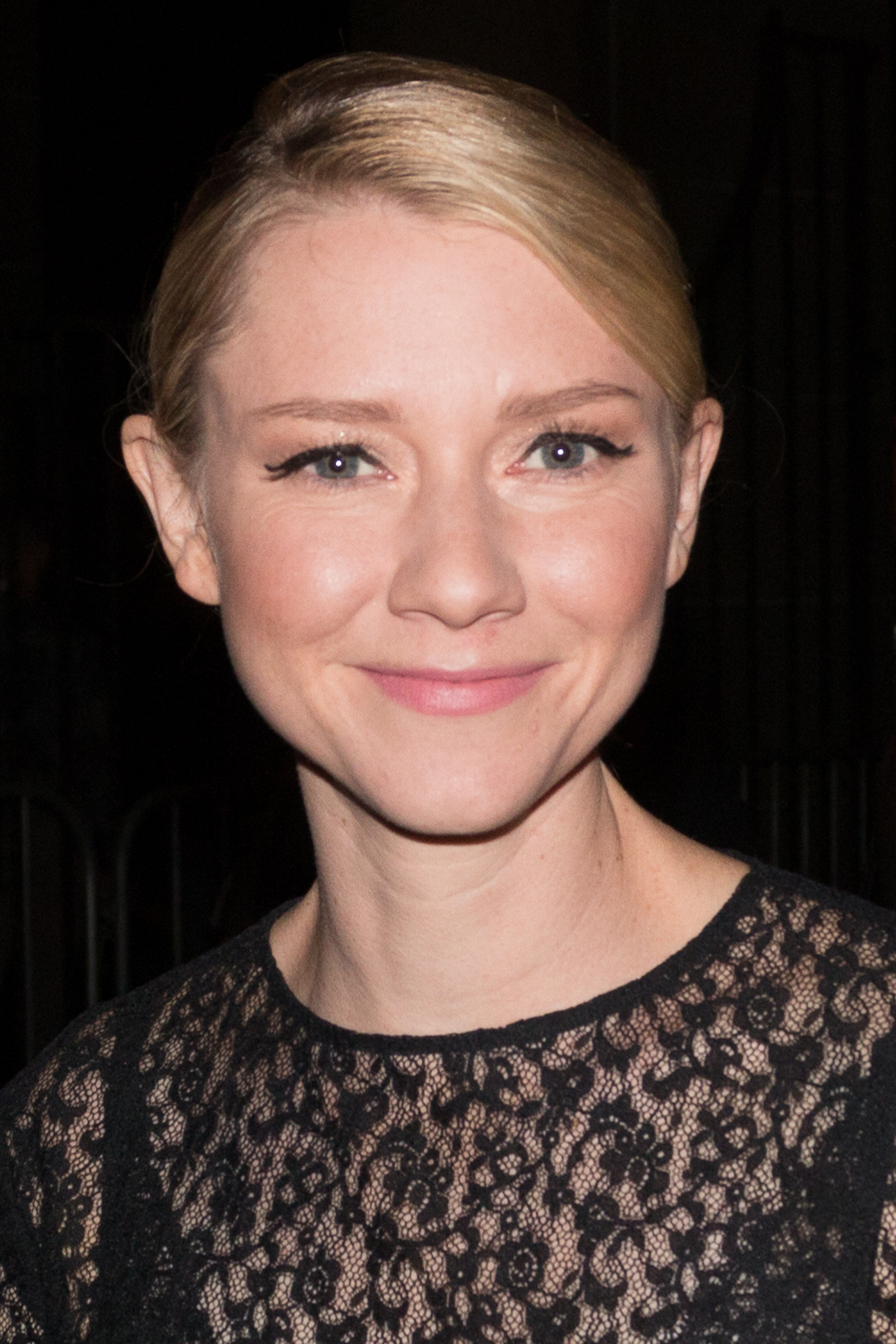
Valorie Curry

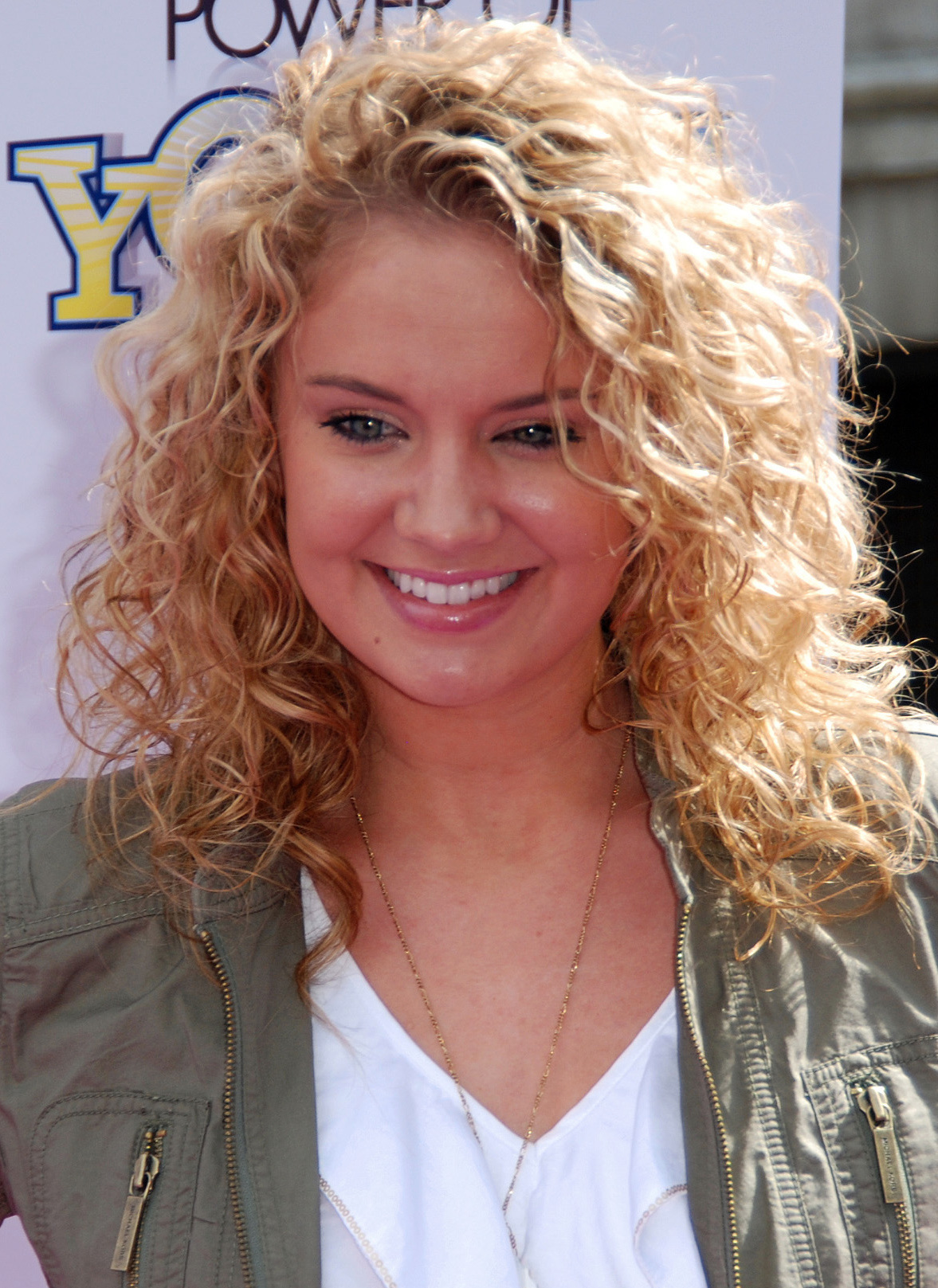
Tiffany Thornton

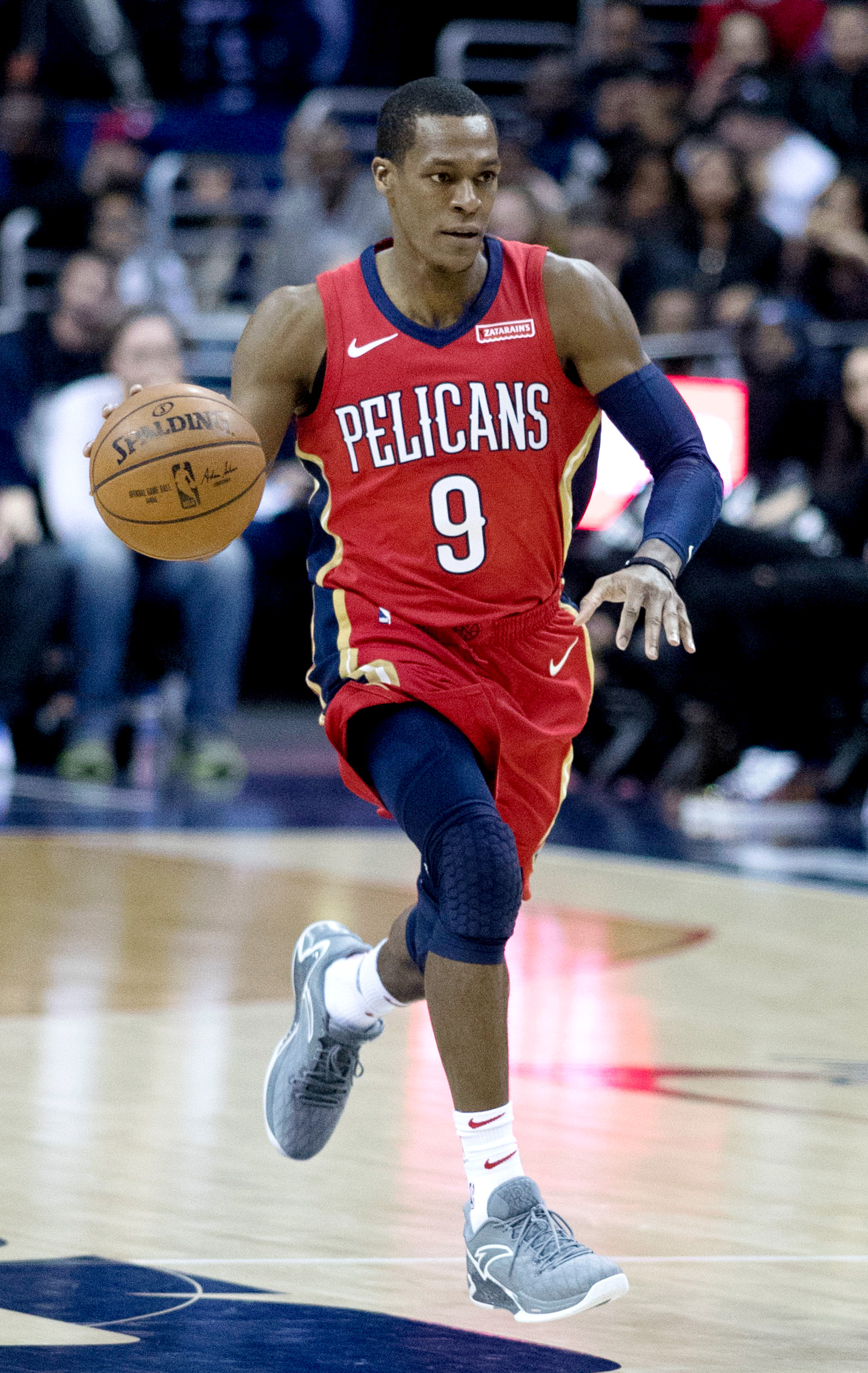
Rajon Rondo

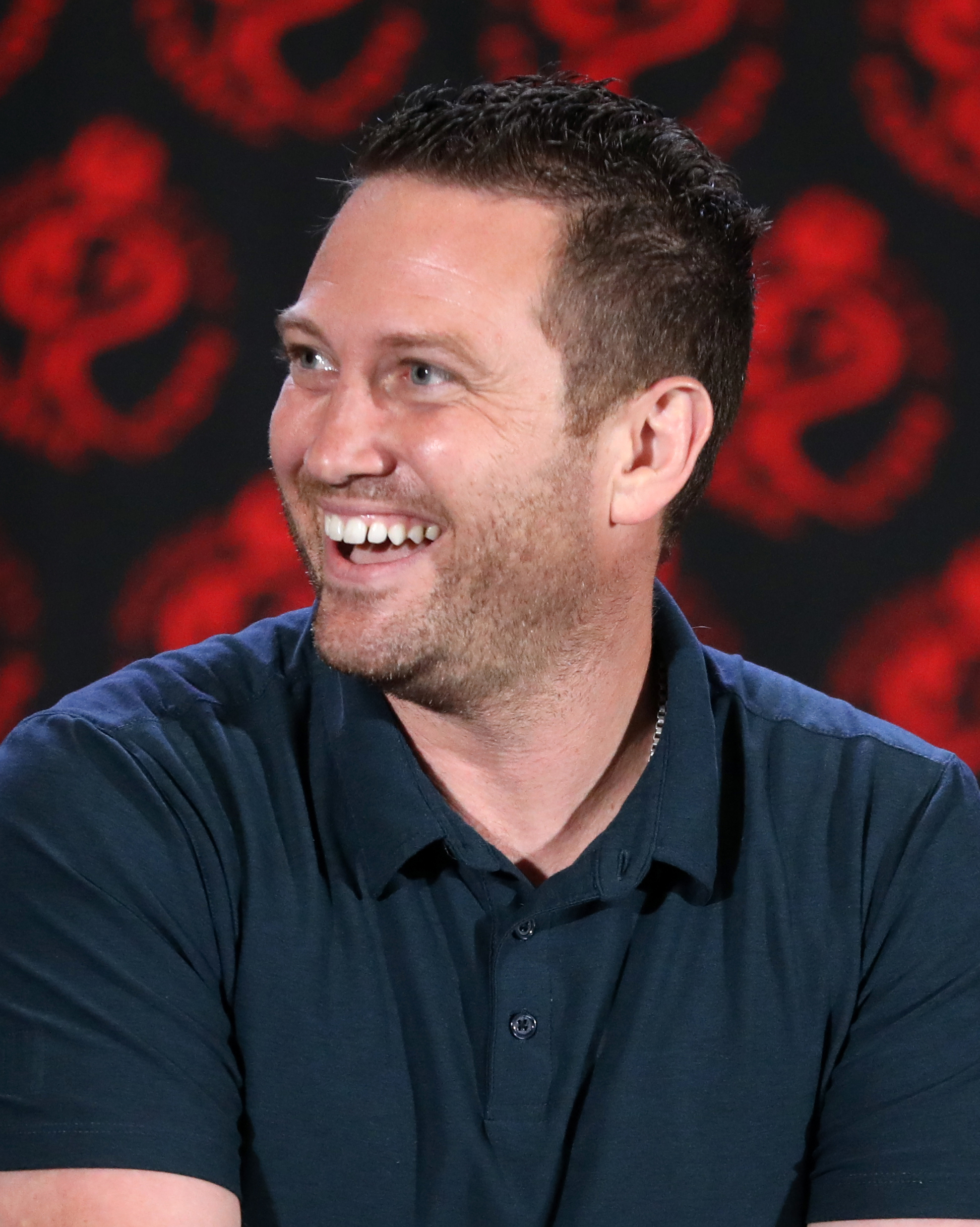
Bryce Papenbrook

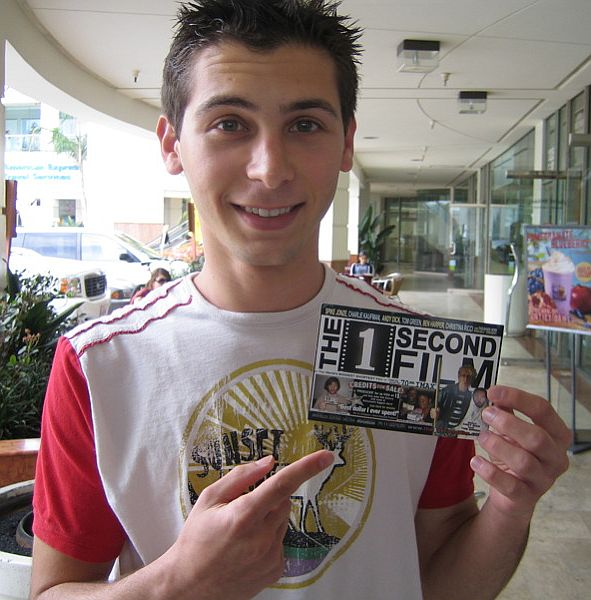
Justin Berfield

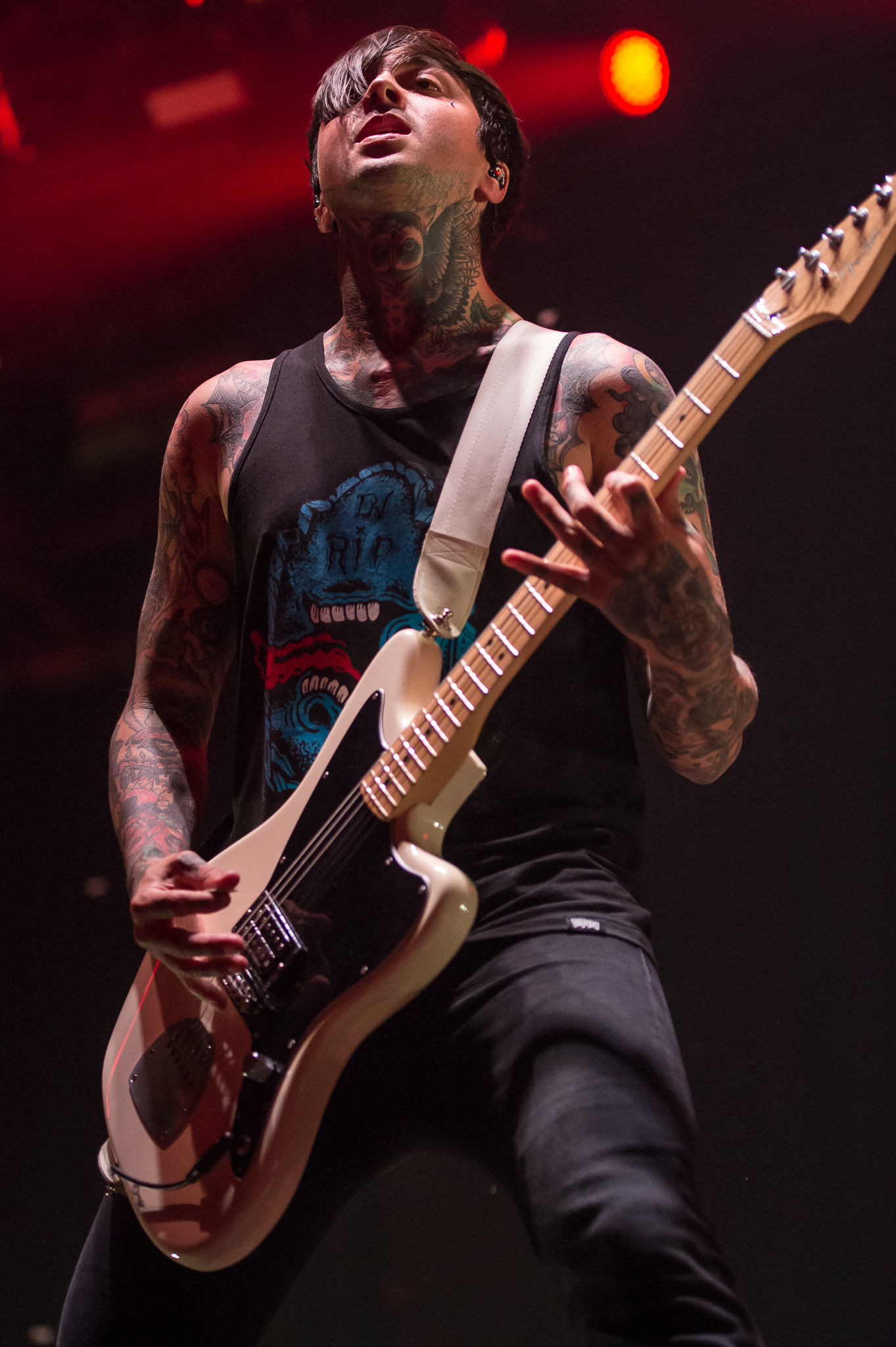
Tony Perry

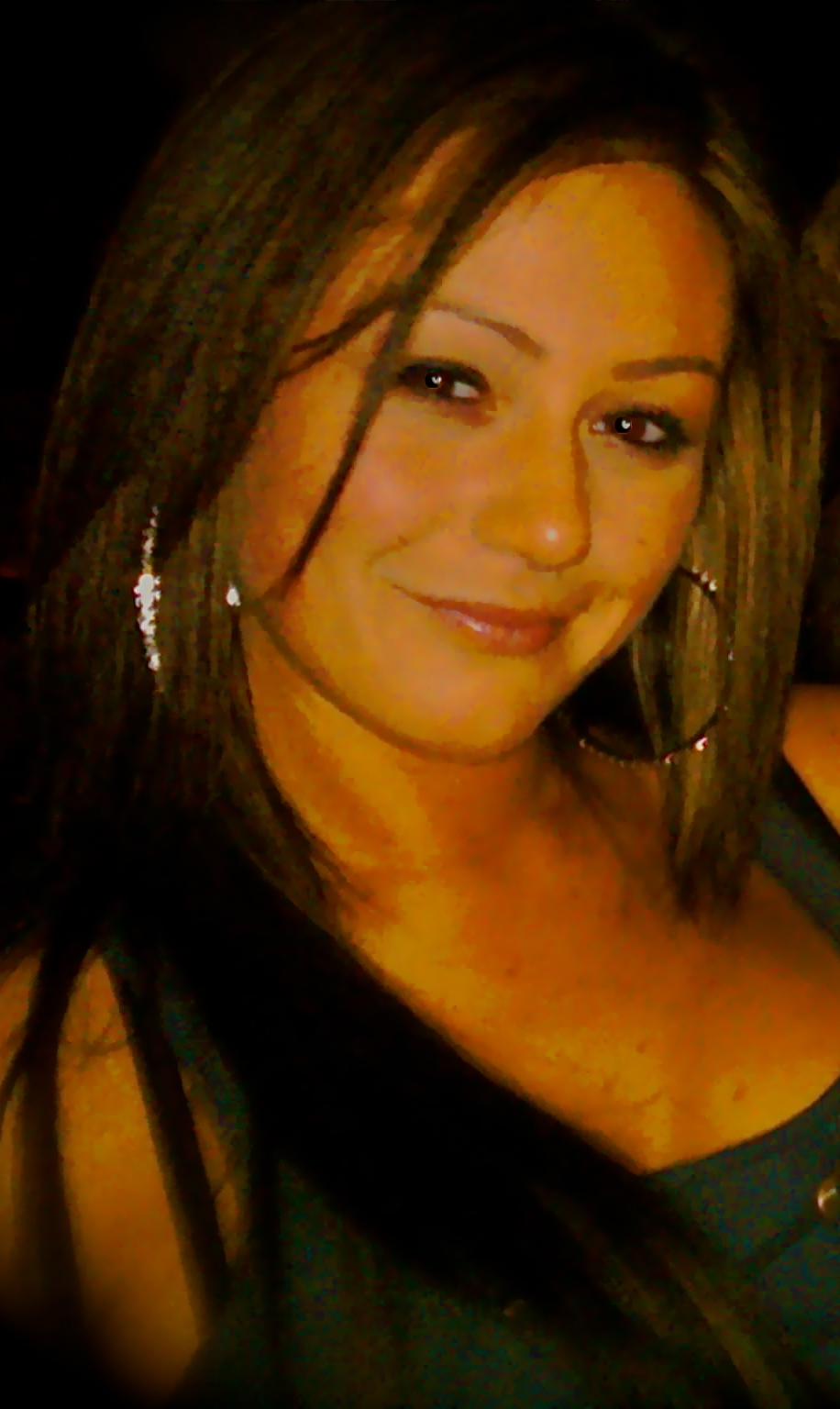
JWoww

- February 1
  - Christopher Abbott, actor
  - Lauren Conrad, TV personality, fashion designer and author
  - Justin Deeley, actor and model
  - Jaka, wrestler (d. 2025)
  - Justin Sellers, baseball player
- February 2
  - Raul Amaya, mixed martial artist
  - Tiffany Vise, figure skater
- February 3 – Justin Alferman, politician
- February 4 – Vin Gerard, wrestler
- February 5
  - Elizabeth Alderfer, actress
  - Jamie Brewer, actress and model
  - Daryll Clark, football player
  - Kevin Gates, hip-hop musician and entrepreneur
  - Madison Rayne, wrestler
  - Reed Sorenson, stock car racer
- February 6
  - Jamaal Anderson, football player
  - Dane DeHaan, actor
  - Alice Greczyn, actress and model
  - Reshard Langford, football player
- February 7
  - Hermes Bautista, actor
  - Stephen Colletti, actor and television personality
  - Josh Collmenter, baseball player
  - James Deen, pornographic actor and director
  - T.J. Dillashaw, mixed martial artist
  - Timothy Reifsnyder, actor
- February 8
  - Matt Bush, baseball player
  - Anderson Paak, musician and record producer
- February 9
  - Adrian Banks, American-born Israeli basketball player
  - Noah Strycker, birdwatcher
- February 10
  - Jeff Adrien, basketball player
  - Josh Akognon, basketball player
  - Roger Allen III, football player
  - Daniel Antúnez, soccer player
  - Blanca, Puerto Rican-born Christian singer/songwriter
- February 11
  - P. J. Brennan, actor
  - Jeremy Bryan, boxer
- February 12
  - Brandon Allen, baseball player
  - Eric Brunner, soccer player
  - Jonny Chops, rock musician
  - Valorie Curry, actress
- February 13
  - Chase Bullock, football player
  - Susan Dunklee, Olympic biathlete
  - Aqib Talib, football player
- February 14
  - Mark Anderson, golfer
  - Cody Balogh, football player
  - Travis Banwart, baseball player
  - Sterling Flunder, soccer player
  - Tiffany Thornton, actress, TV personality, and singer
- February 15
  - Nick Eversman, actor
  - Amber Riley, actress, singer, and author
- February 16 – Matt Case, ice hockey player
- February 17
  - Rich Costanzo. soccer player
  - Brett Kern, football player
  - Daphne Oz, TV host, food writer, and chef
  - Ricardo Rodriguez, wrestler and commentator
- February 18
  - Jack Allison, writer, podcaster, and comedian
  - Cameron Clapp, amputee and motivational speaker
  - Robert DeLong, electronic musician
  - Dumbfoundead, Argentine-born rapper and actor
  - Brandon Flowers, football player
- February 19
  - Terence Brown, football player
  - Michael Schwimer, baseball player and businessman
- February 20
  - Julio Borbón, baseball player
  - Chukwudi Chijindu, soccer player
- February 21
  - Cadence Weapon, Canadian-born rapper
- February 22
  - Miko Hughes, actor
  - Rajon Rondo, basketball player
- February 23
  - Jack Abraham, businessperson, serial entrepreneur, and investor
  - Skylar Grey, pop singer
  - Jerod Mayo, football player
- February 24
  - Katie Burkhart, softball player
  - Bryce Papenbrook, voice actor
  - Benjamin Safdie, actor and filmmaker
- February 25
  - Jay Ayres, soccer player
  - Callum Black, American-born Irish rugby player
  - Justin Berfield, actor, writer, and producer
  - Erik Cordier, baseball player
  - Tony Perry, lead guitarist for Pierce the Veil
- February 26 – JWoww, TV personality
- February 27
  - Nicky Anosike, basketball player
  - Folarin Campbell, basketball player
  - Anthony Fahden, Olympic rower
  - Daniel Gibson, basketball player
  - Ashthon Jones, singer
- February 28
  - David Bentz, politician
  - Olivia Palermo, entrepreneur, model, fashion influencer, and TV personality
  - Eugene Puryear, journalist, author, activist, and political candidate

=== March ===
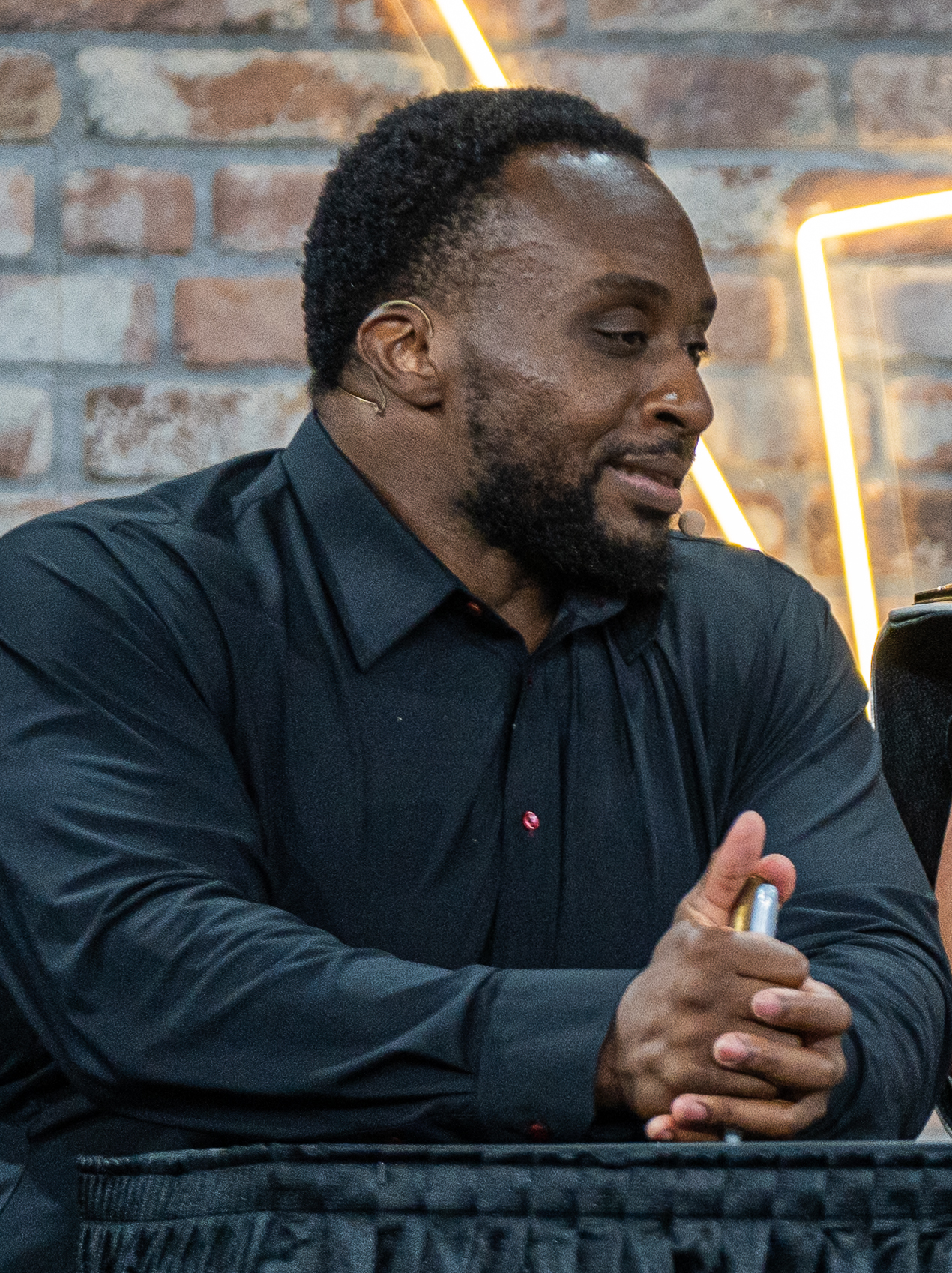
Big E

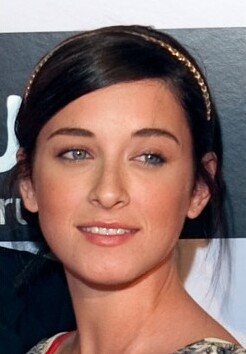
Margo Harshman

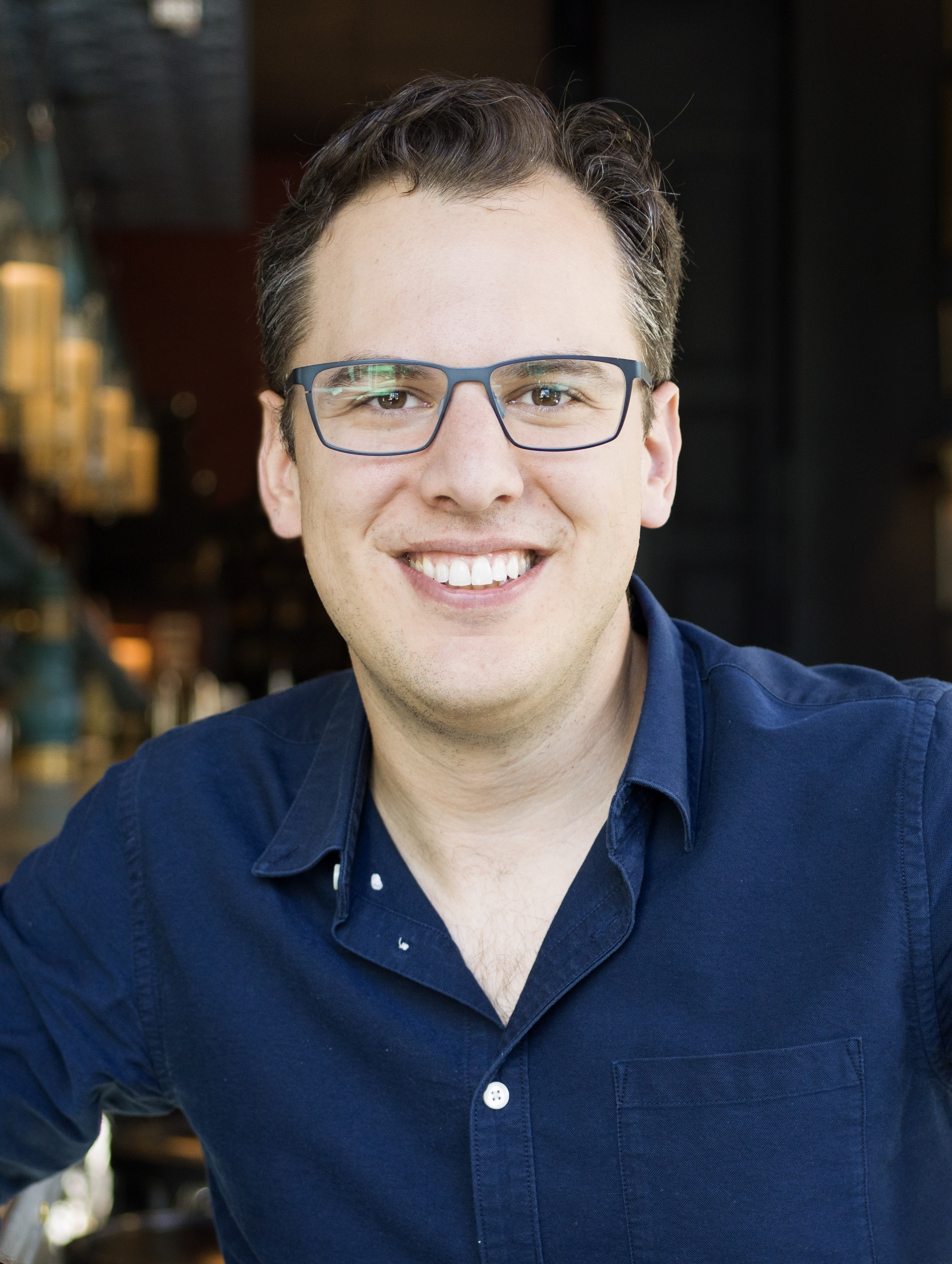
Mike Krieger

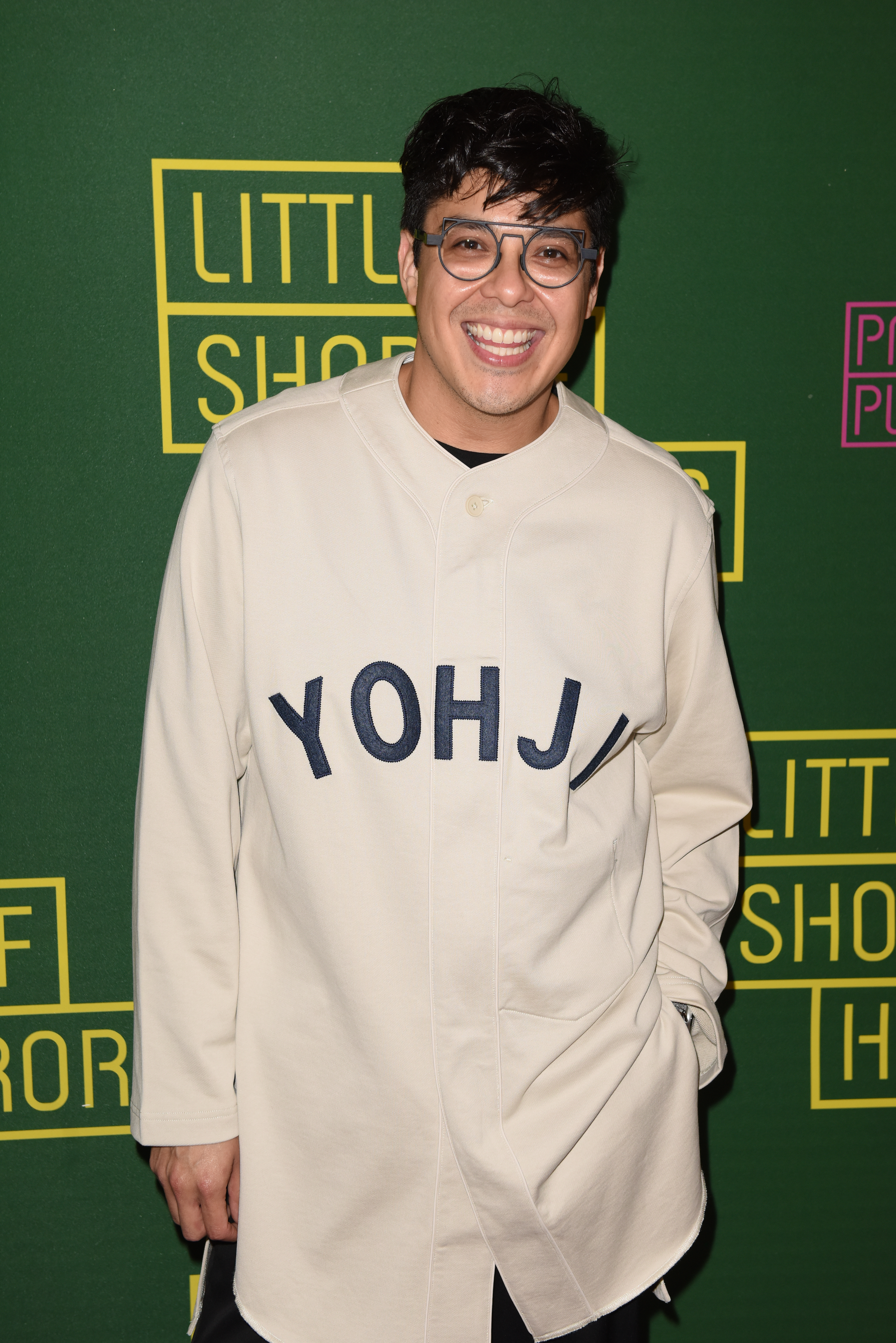
George Salazar

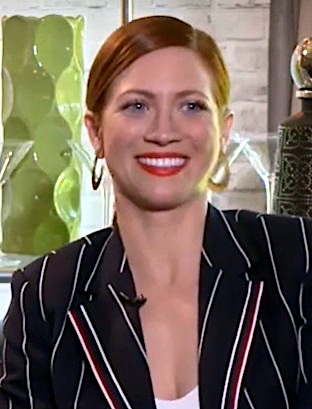
Brittany Snow

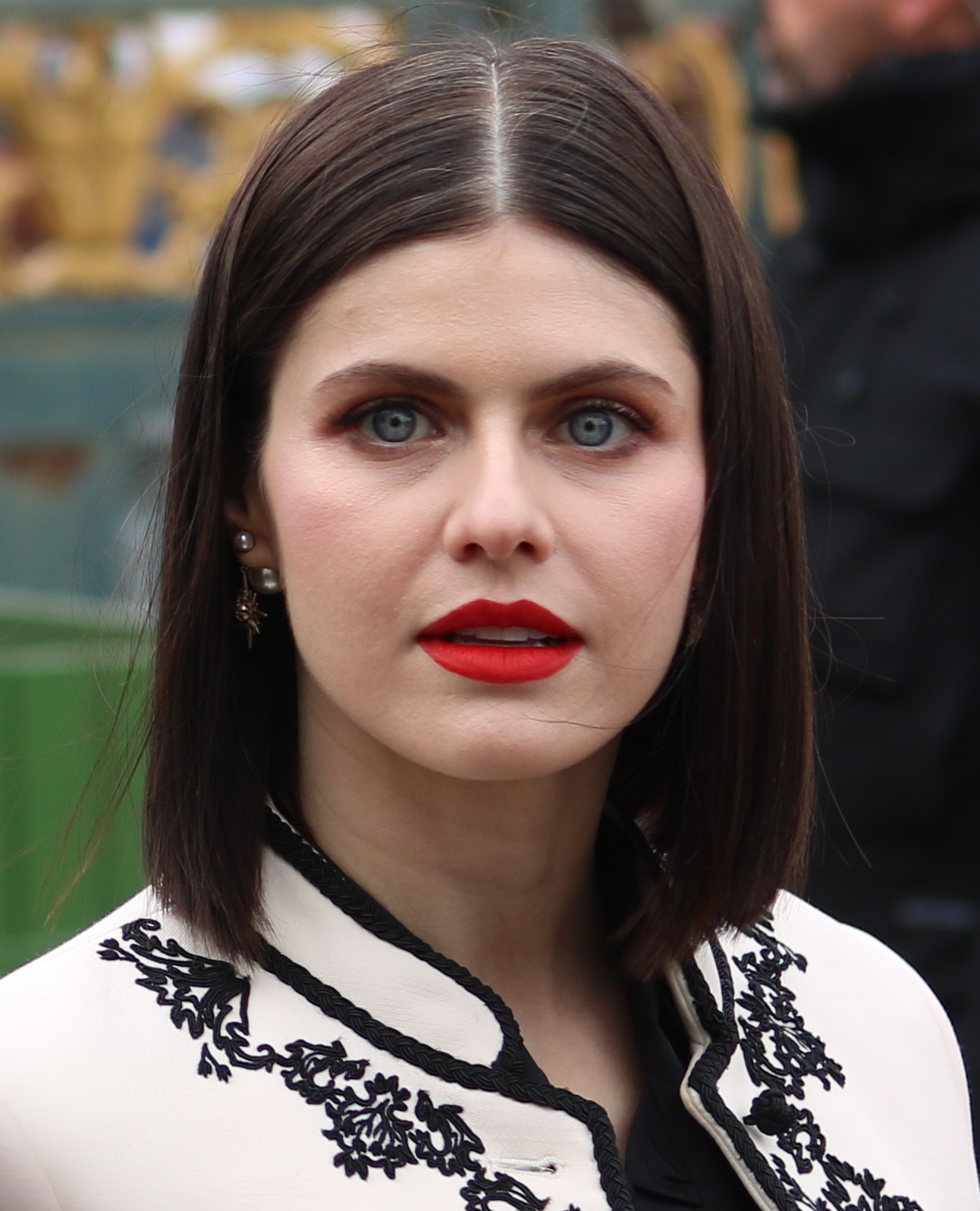
Alexandra Daddario

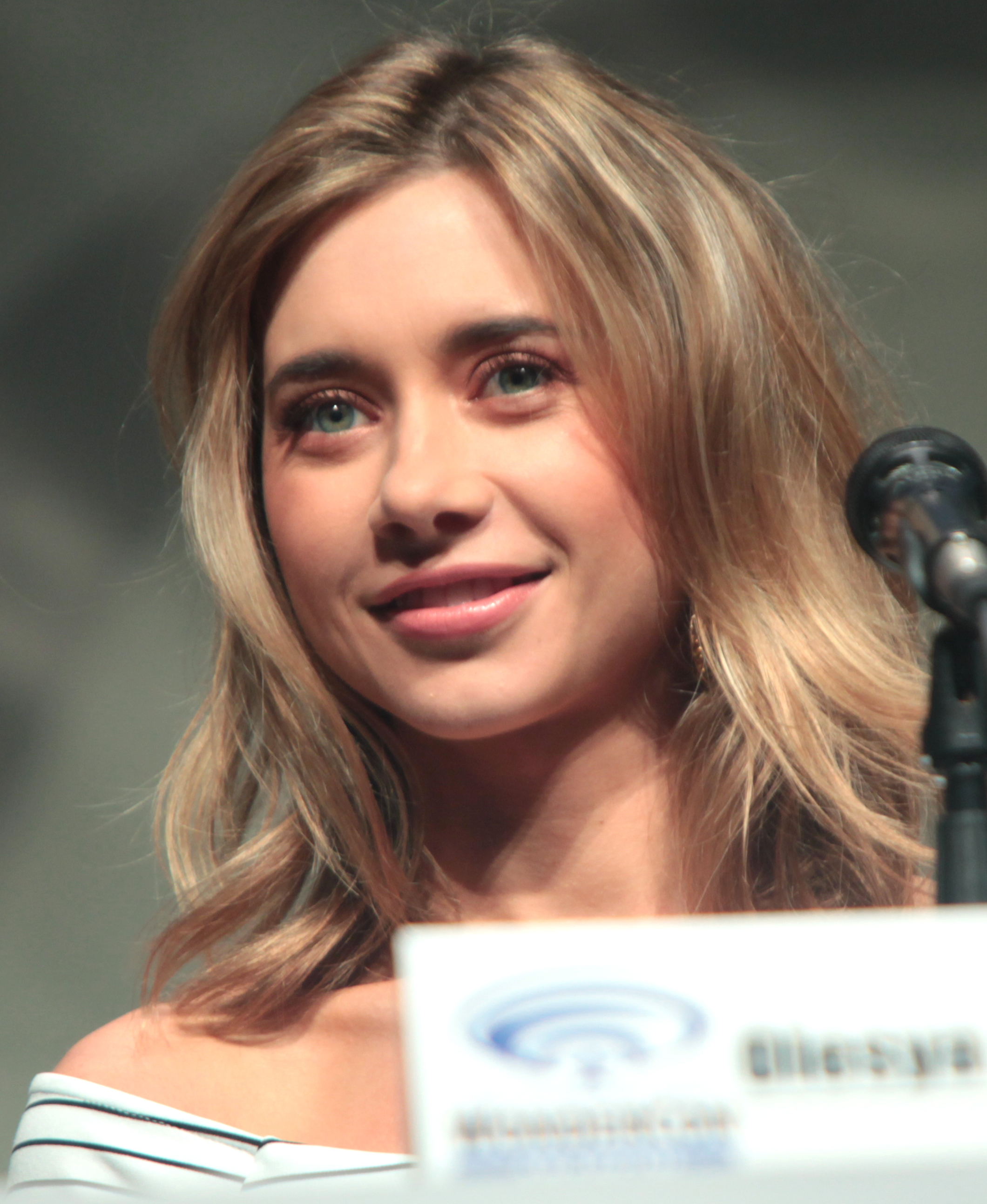
Olesya Rulin

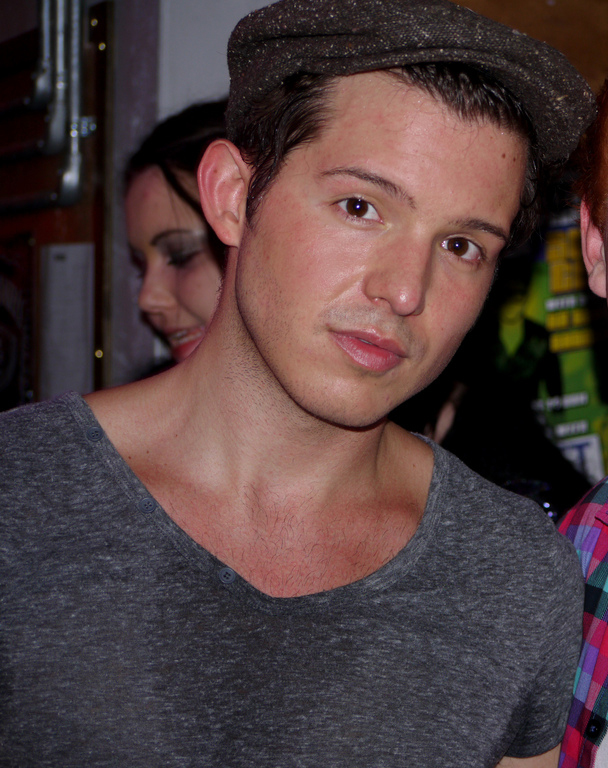
Simon Curtis

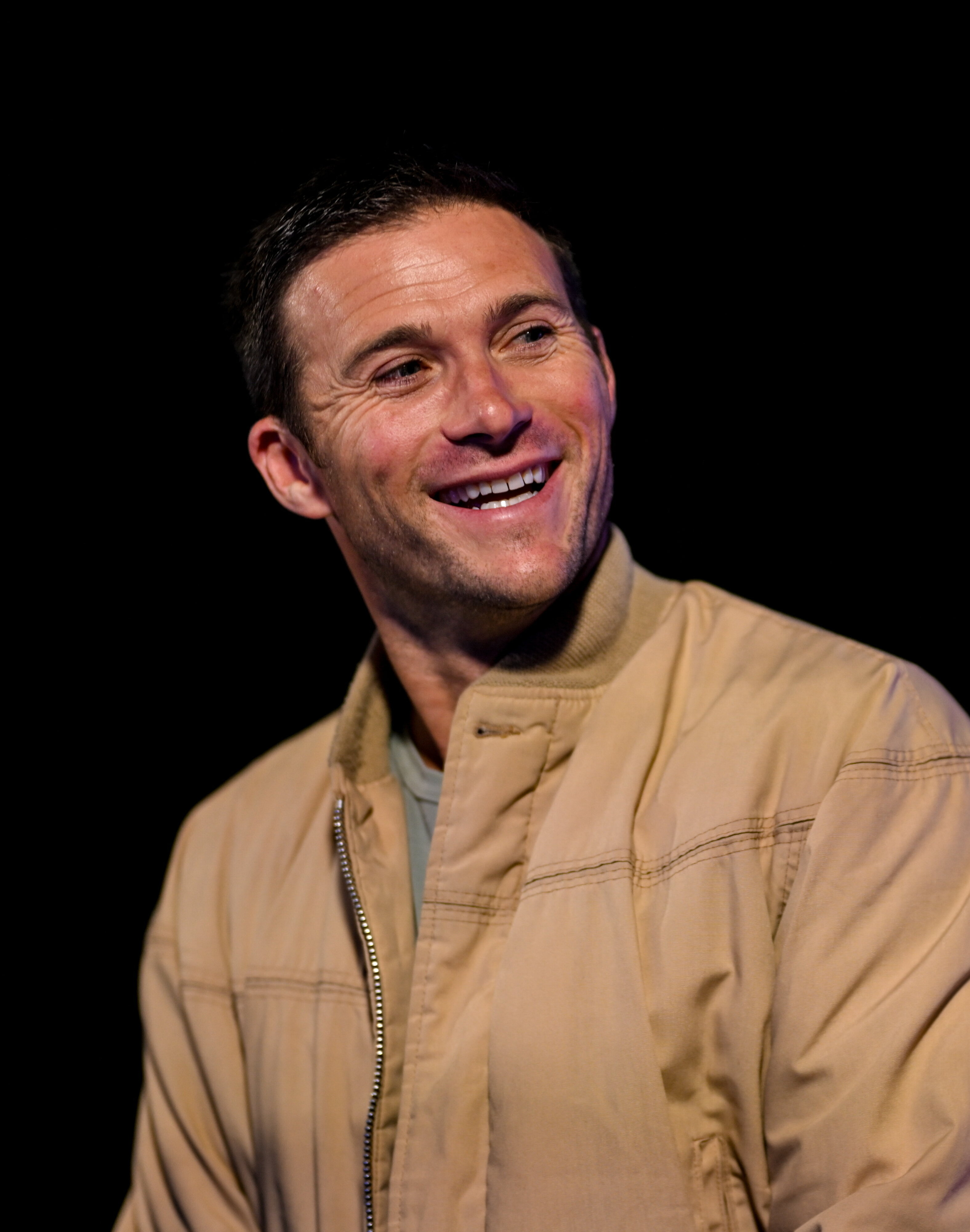
Scott Eastwood

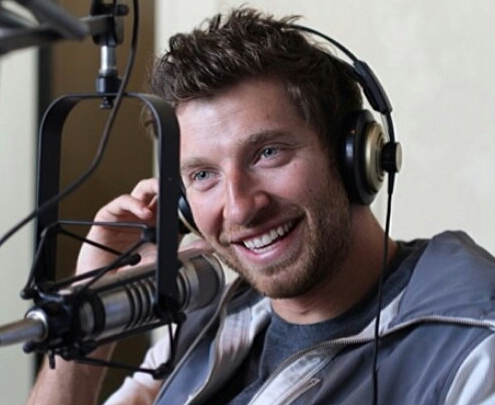
Brett Eldredge

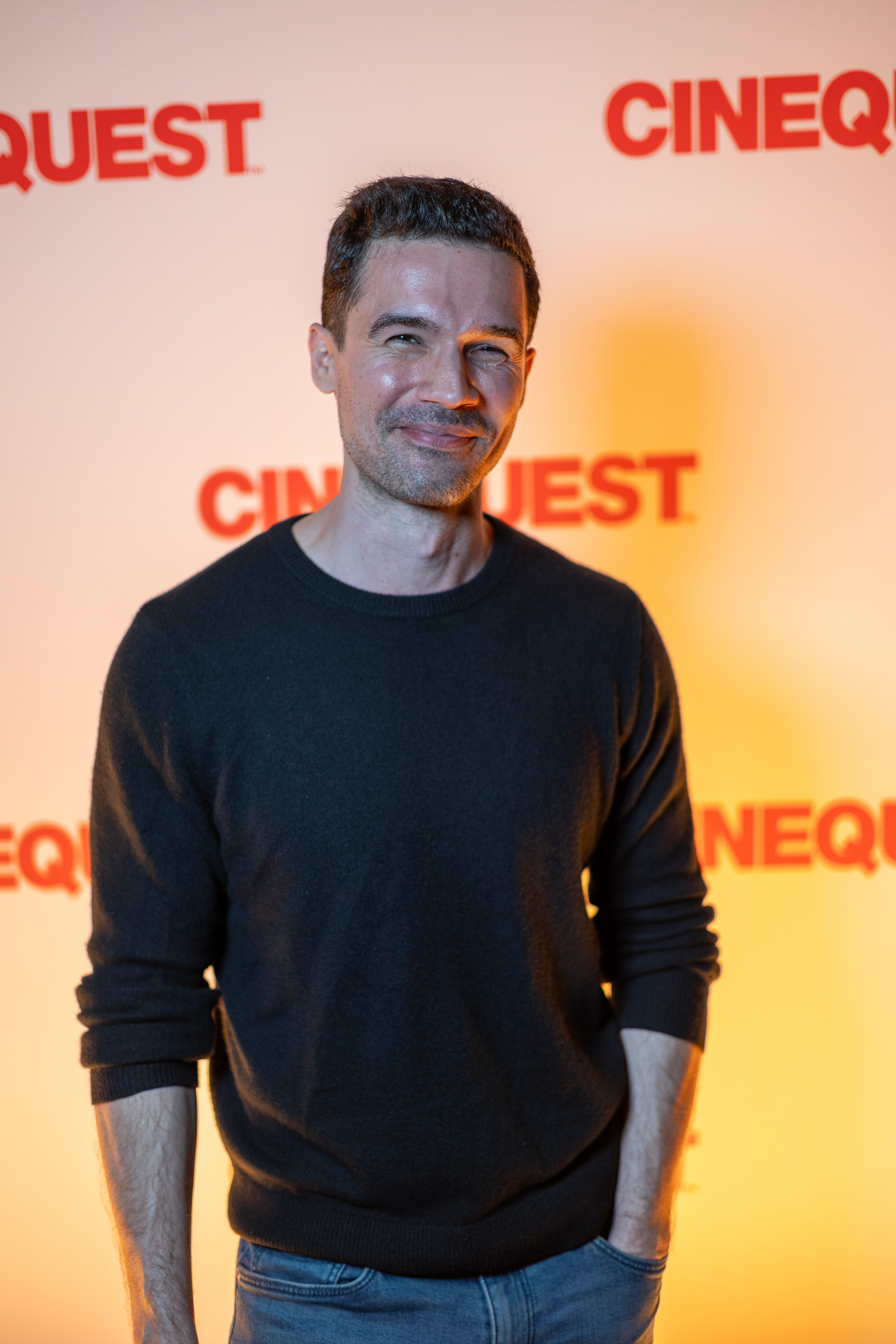
Steven Strait

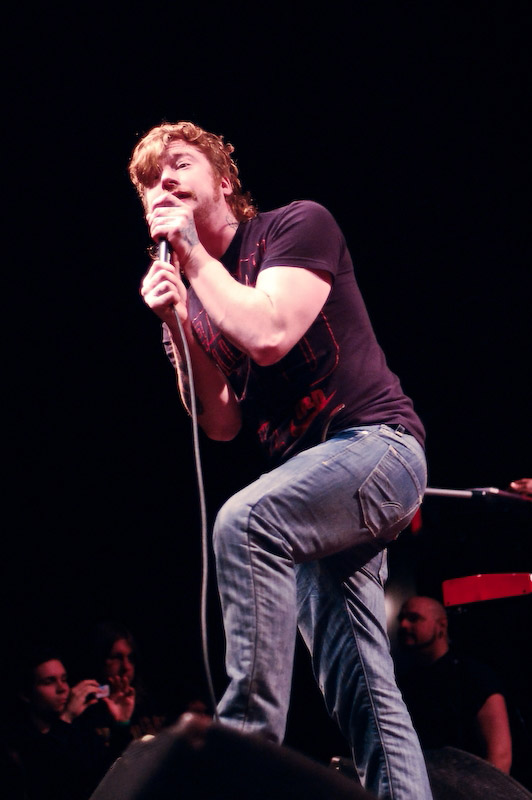
Jonny Craig

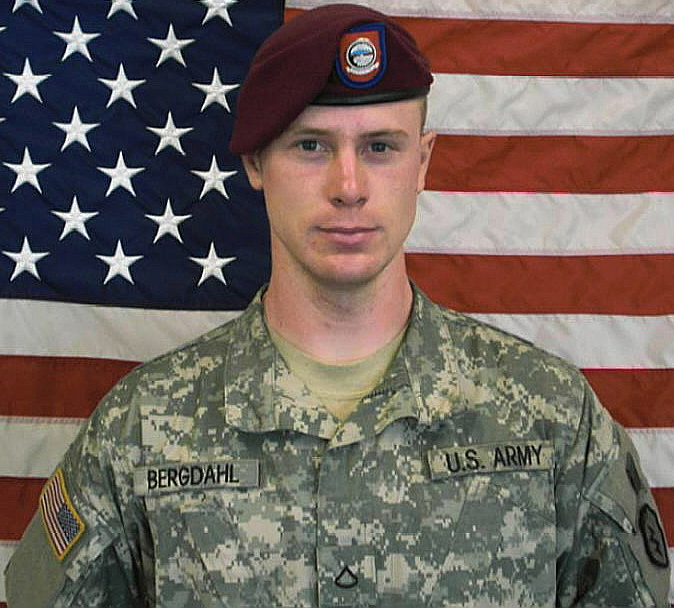
Bowe Bergdahl

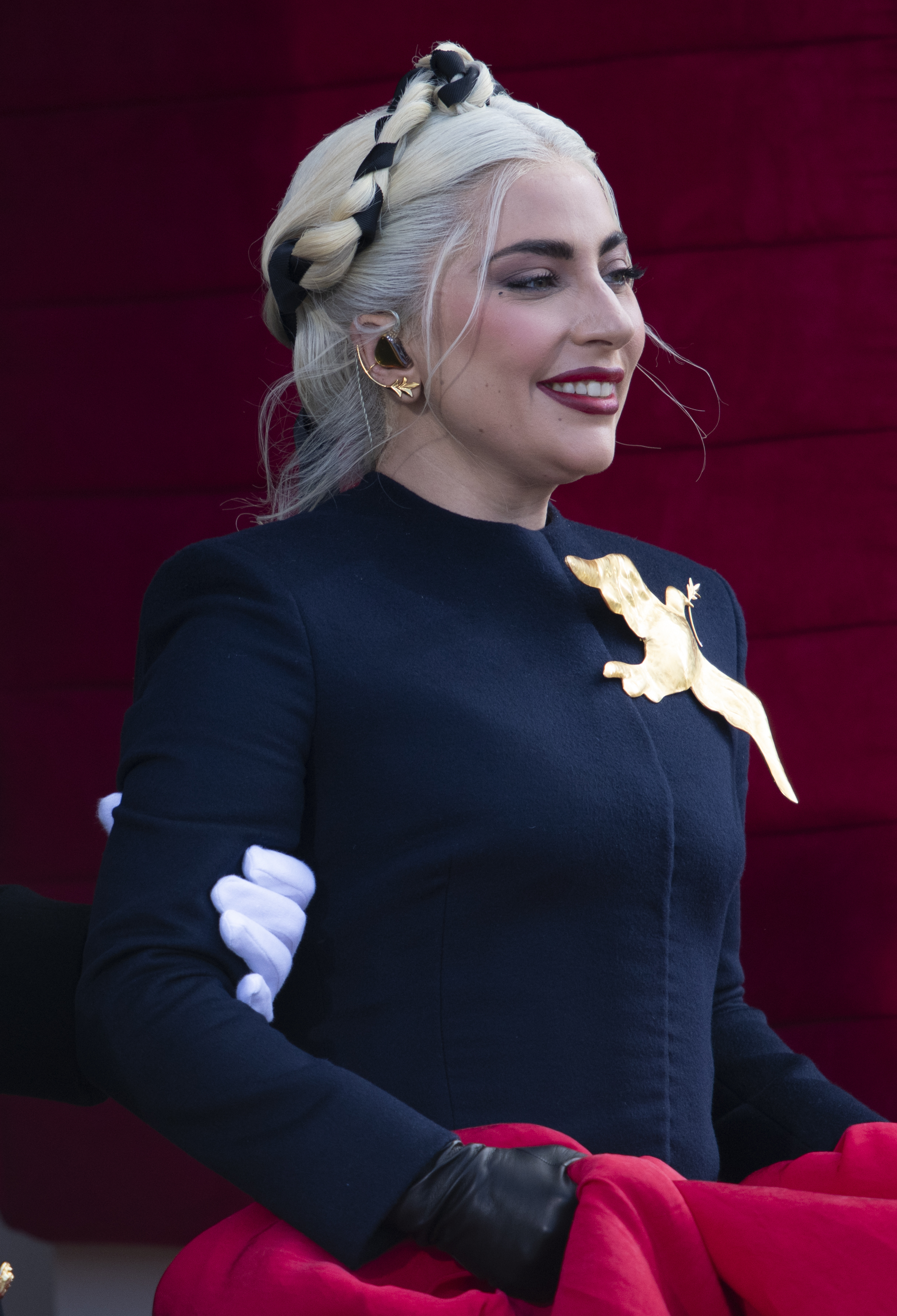
Lady Gaga

- March 1
  - Chris Baker, golfer
  - Big E, wrestler, voice actor, football player, and powerlifter
  - Jonathan Spector, soccer player
- March 2 – Ethan Peck, actor
- March 3
  - Daniel Anderson, musician and record producer
  - Dominic Cianciarulo, soccer player
  - Jed Collins, football player
  - Eric Farris, baseball player
  - Stacie Orrico, singer
- March 4
  - Dalton Castle, wrestler
  - Audrey Esparza, actress
  - Margo Harshman, actress
  - Mike Krieger, Brazilian-born entrepreneur, software engineer, and co-founder of Instagram
  - Caesar Rayford, football player
- March 5
  - Christylez Bacon, hip hop artist
  - Corey Brewer, basketball player
  - Cameron Colvin, football player
  - Jason Fuchs, actor and screenwriter
  - Julie Henderson, model
  - Andrew Jenks, filmmaker
  - Sarah J. Maas, novelist
- March 6
  - Jake Arrieta, baseball player
  - Evan Bush, soccer player
  - Timothy DeLaGhetto, media personality
  - Eli Marienthal, actor
- March 7
  - Ryan Ciminelli, bowler
  - George Salazar, actor, singer, and musician
- March 8 – Chad Gable, wrestler
- March 9
  - Jason DeSantis, hockey player
  - Tim Pool, podcaster
  - Brittany Snow, actress
- March 10 – Summer Edward, Trinidadian-born writer and children's editor
- March 11
  - Aleah Chapin, painter
  - Dorthia Cottrell, singer and frontperson for Windhand
  - Marc Okubo, guitarist for Veil of Maya
- March 12
  - Chris Burkard, photographer and artist
  - Joey Butler, baseball player
- March 13 – Ashley Charters, softball player
- March 14
  - Corey Ashe, soccer player
  - Kim Conley, Olympic middle and long-distance runner
- March 15
  - Natalie Prass, singer/songwriter
  - Chilo Rachal, football player
  - Darell Scott, football player
- March 16
  - Andy Cherry, Christian singer/songwriter
  - Alexandra Daddario, actress
  - Kenny Dykstra, wrestler
  - T. J. Jordan, basketball player
  - Mickey Storey, baseball player
- March 17
  - Chris Clemence, bassist
  - Margaret Crowley, Olympic speed skater
  - Olesya Rulin, Russian-born actress
- March 18
  - Darius Butler, football player
  - Simon Curtis, singer/songwriter, record producer, and actor
  - Jared Gaither, football player
- March 19
  - Ahmad Bradshaw, football player
  - Chris Crenshaw, baseball player and coach
  - Anne Vyalitsyna, Russian-born model
- March 20
  - Justin Bostrom, ice hockey player
  - Rachel Fannan, singer/songwriter, musician, and poet
  - Cecil Newton, football player
  - Sammus, rapper
- March 21
  - Rob Bruggeman, football player
  - Scott Eastwood, actor
- March 22
  - Matt Bush, actor
  - David Choi, music and internet personality
  - Dexter Fowler, baseball player
- March 23
  - Konstantin Batygin, Russian-born astronomer and professor at Caltech
  - Patrick Cowan, Canadian-born football player
  - Brett Eldredge, country music singer
  - Steven Strait, actor
  - Lisa Surihani, Malaysian-born actress
- March 24
  - Miles Craigwell, rugby player
  - Valentin Chmerkovskiy, Ukrainian-born dancer
  - Kyle Maynard, motivational speaker, author, and No Excuses CrossFit Gym owner
- March 25
  - Megan Gibson-Loftin, softball player
  - Kyle Lowry, basketball player
- March 26
  - Danita Angell, model
  - Matt Castelo, football player
  - Keith Cothran, basketball player
  - Jonny Craig, Canadian-born singer/songwriter for Dance Gavin Dance (2007–2012), Emarosa (2008–2012), and Slaves (2014–2018)
  - Misty Stone, pornographic actress
- March 27
  - Titus Brown, football player
  - Brittani Coury, Paralympic snowboarder
  - Bonnie Gordon, actress and singer
  - SoCal Val, wrestling personality
- March 28
  - Mustafa Ali, wrestler
  - Bowe Bergdahl, United States Army soldier and deserter captured by the Taliban
  - Justin Brantly, football player
  - Lady Gaga, pop singer/songwriter and actress
  - J-Kwon, rapper
  - Evan Rankin, hockey player
  - Young Scooter, rapper (d. 2025)
- March 29 – Lucas Elliot Eberl, actor and director
- March 30
  - Tyrone Brazelton, basketball player
  - Tessa Ferrer, actress
- March 31
  - Add-2, rapper
  - Brandon Copeland, football player
  - Peter Silberman, guitarist and vocalist for The Antlers

=== April ===
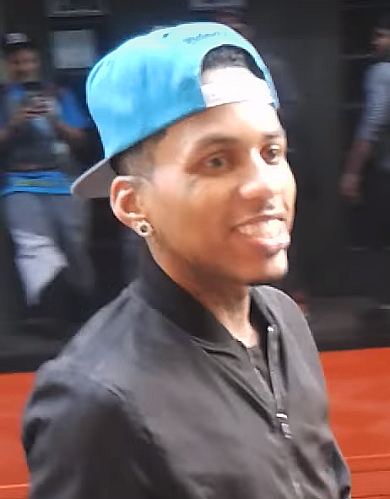
Kid Ink

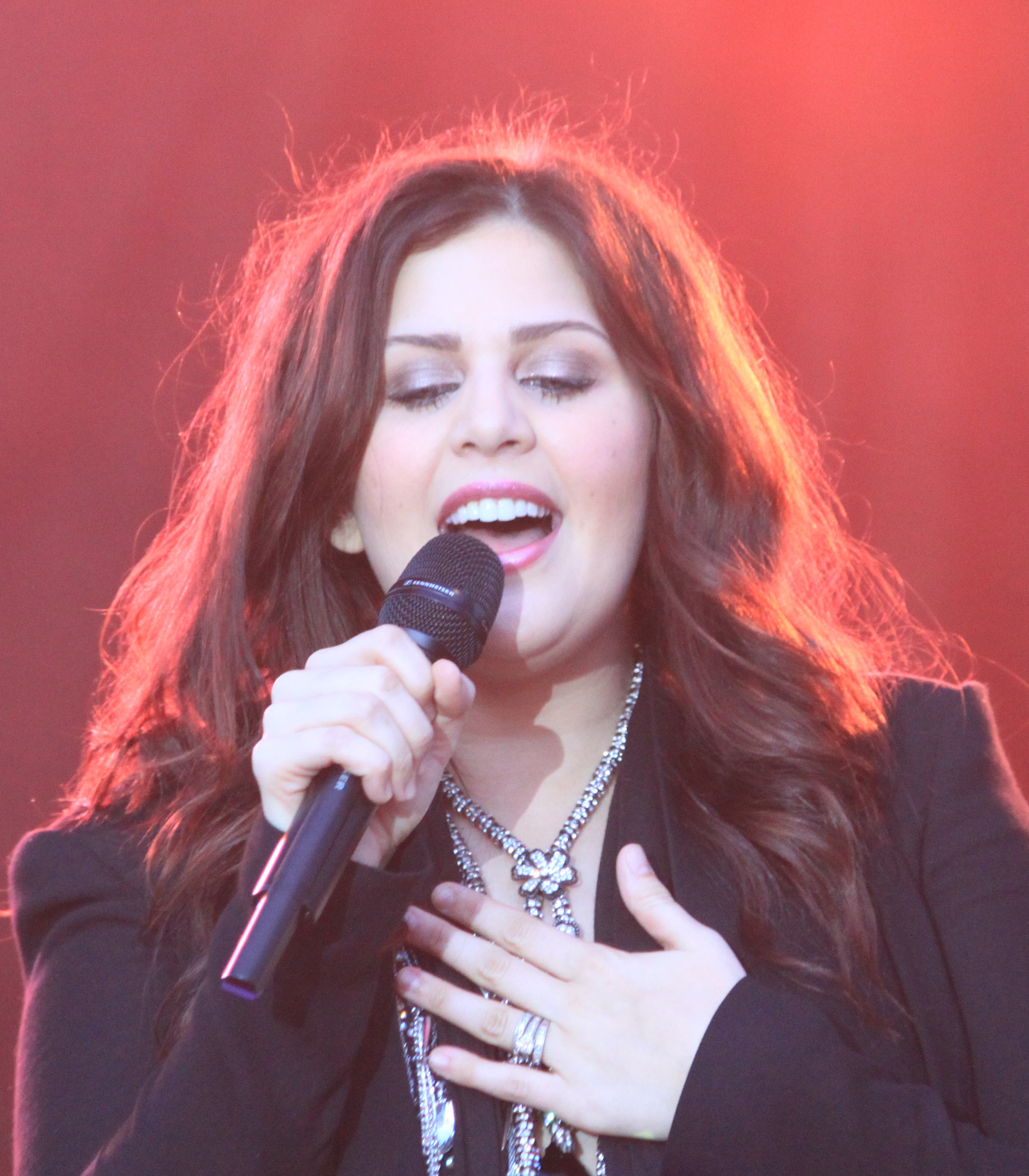
Hillary Scott

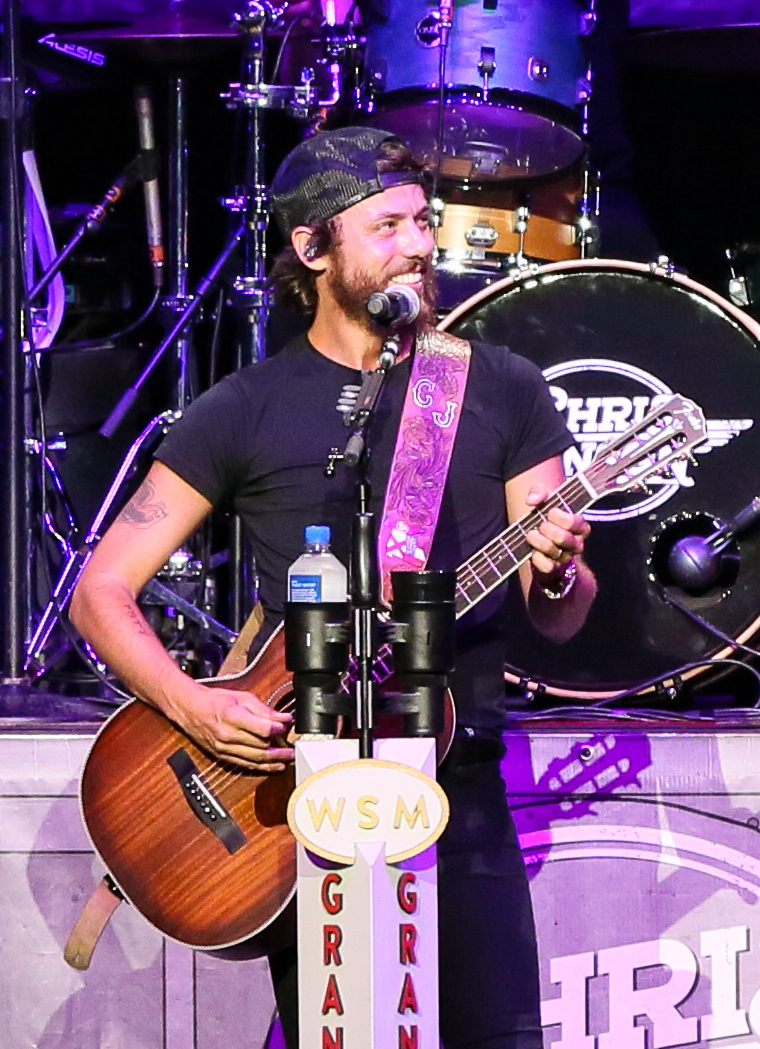
Chris Janson

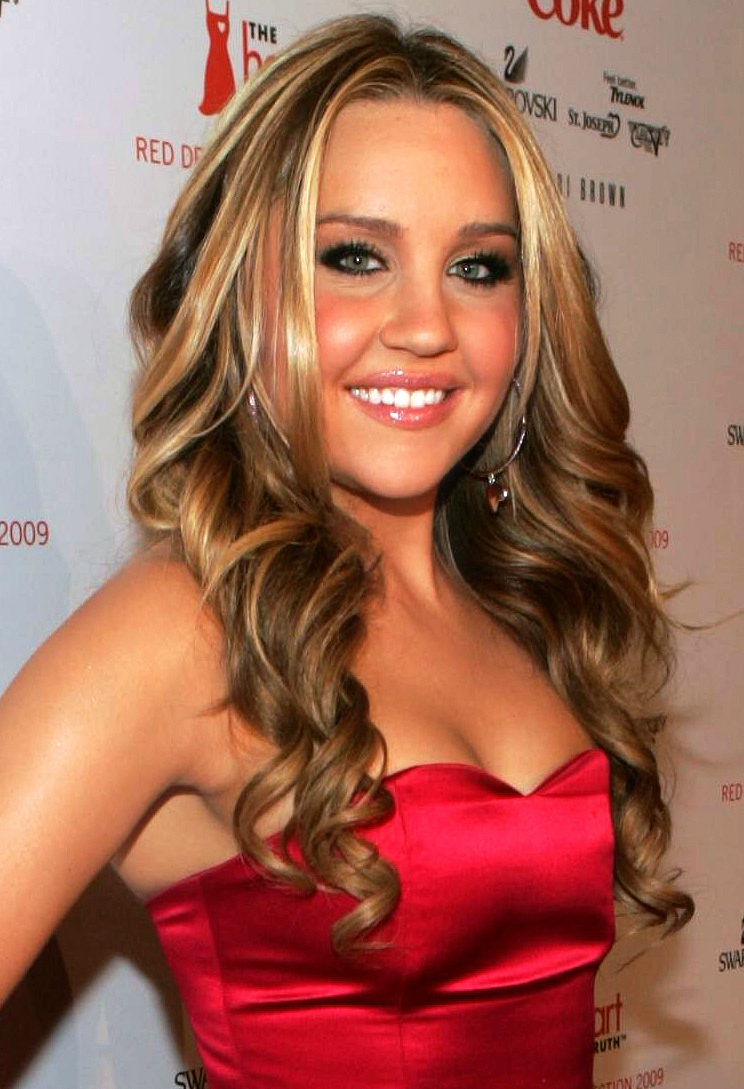
Amanda Bynes

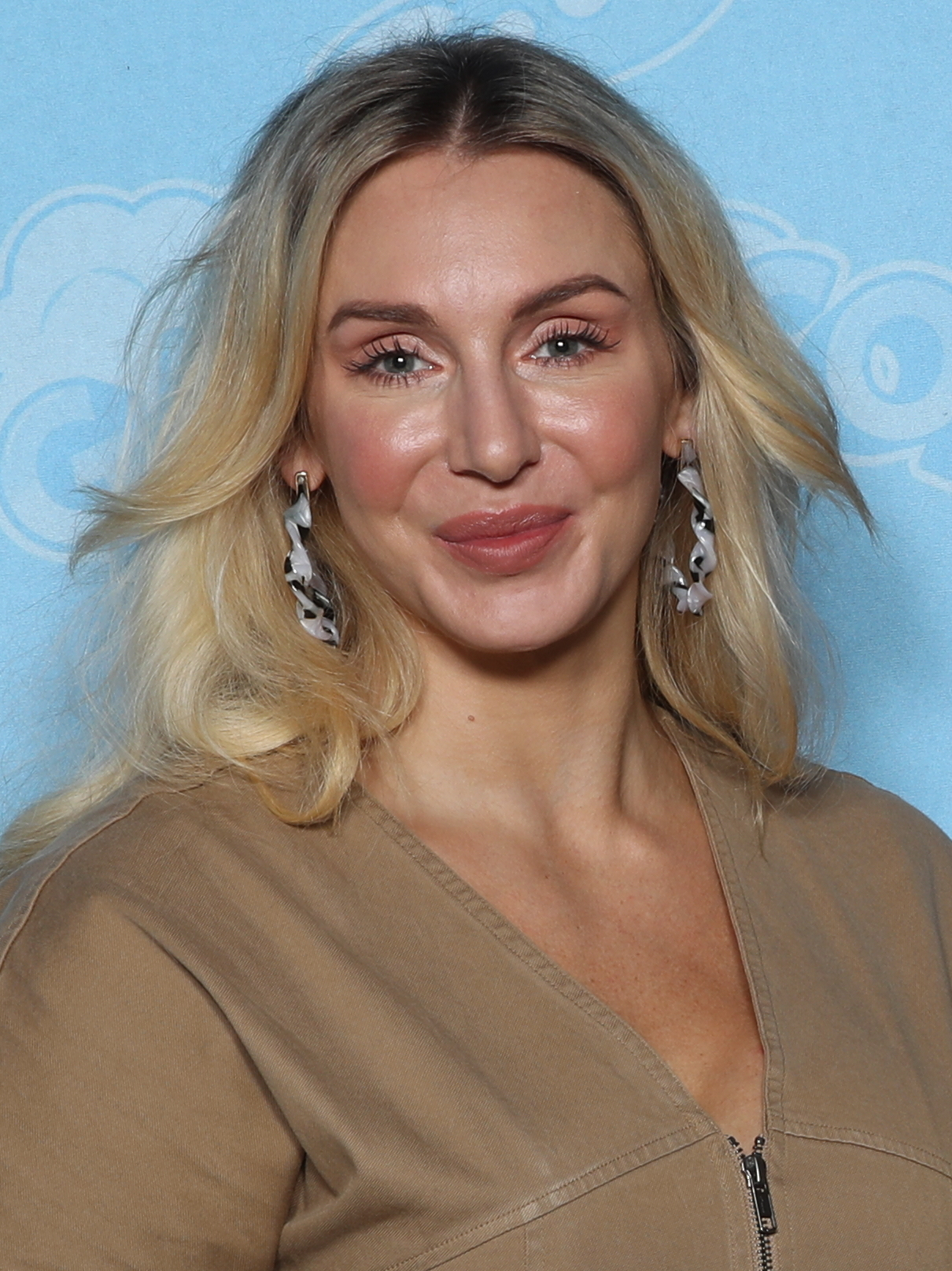
Charlotte Flair

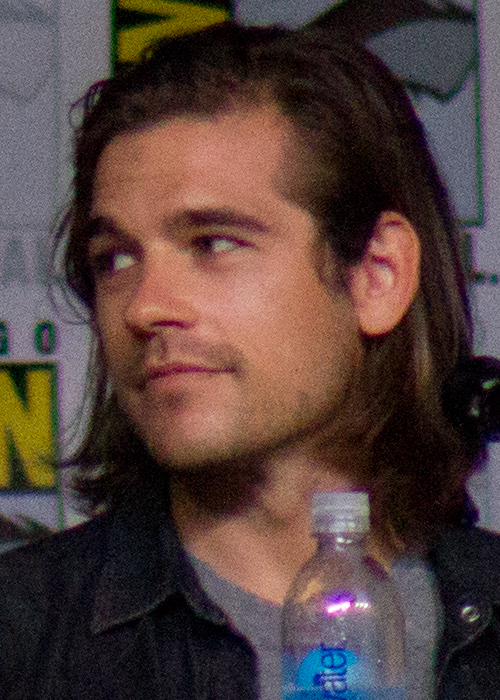
Jason Ralph

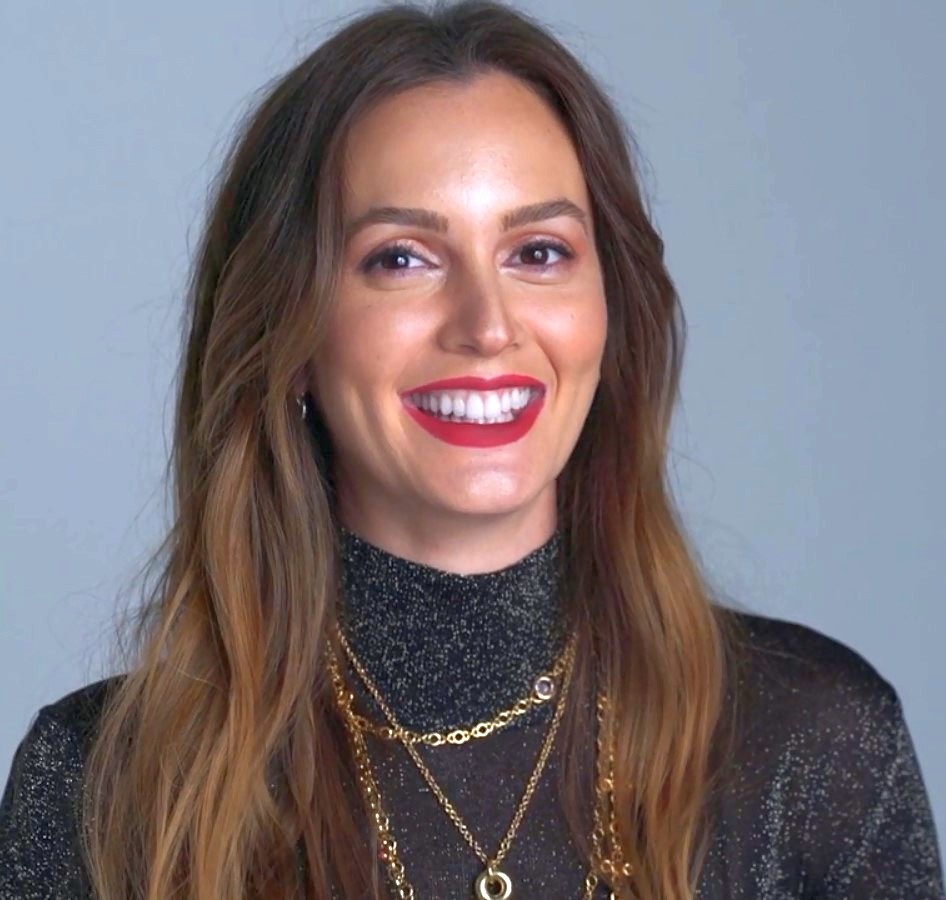
Leighton Meester

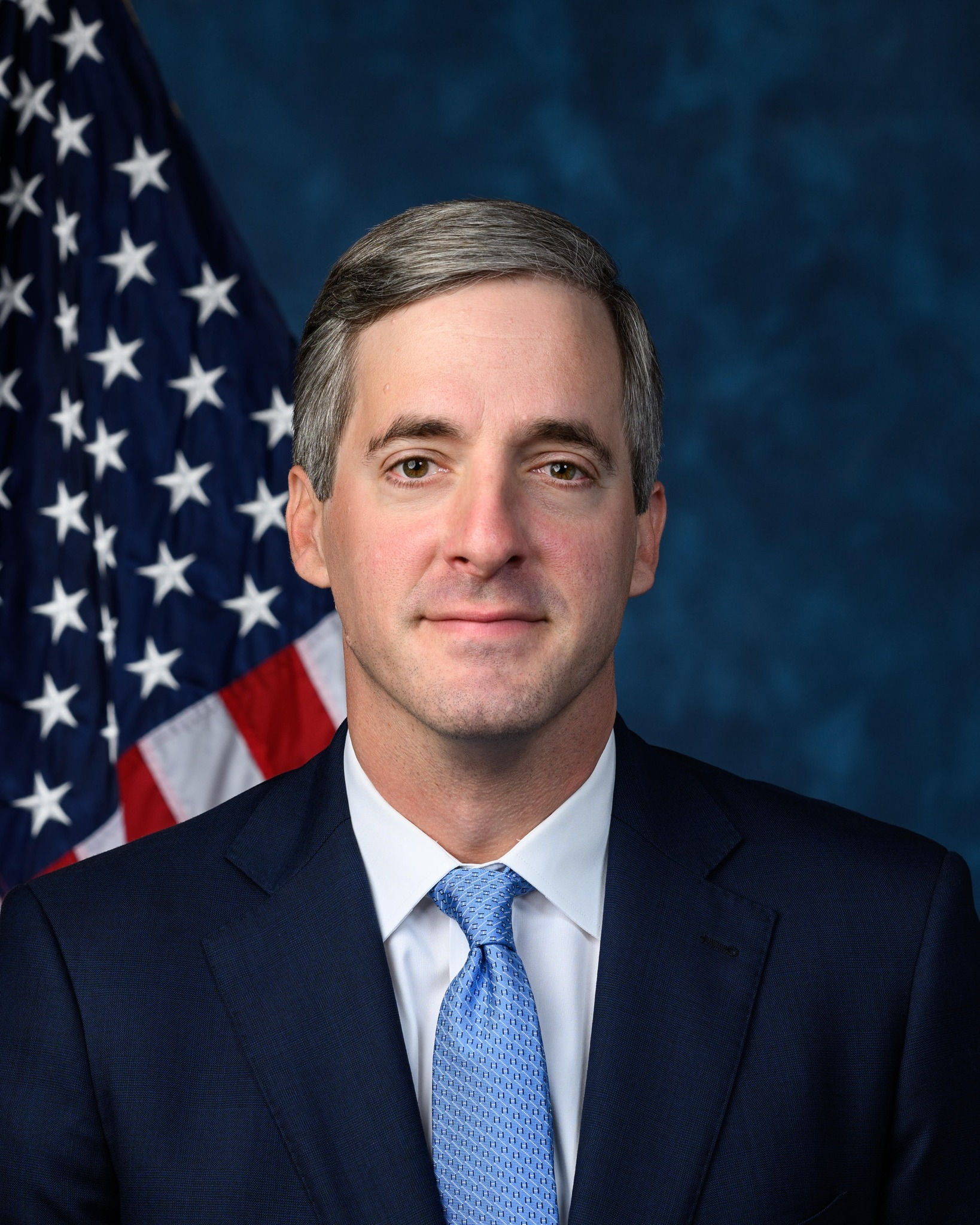
Brad Knott

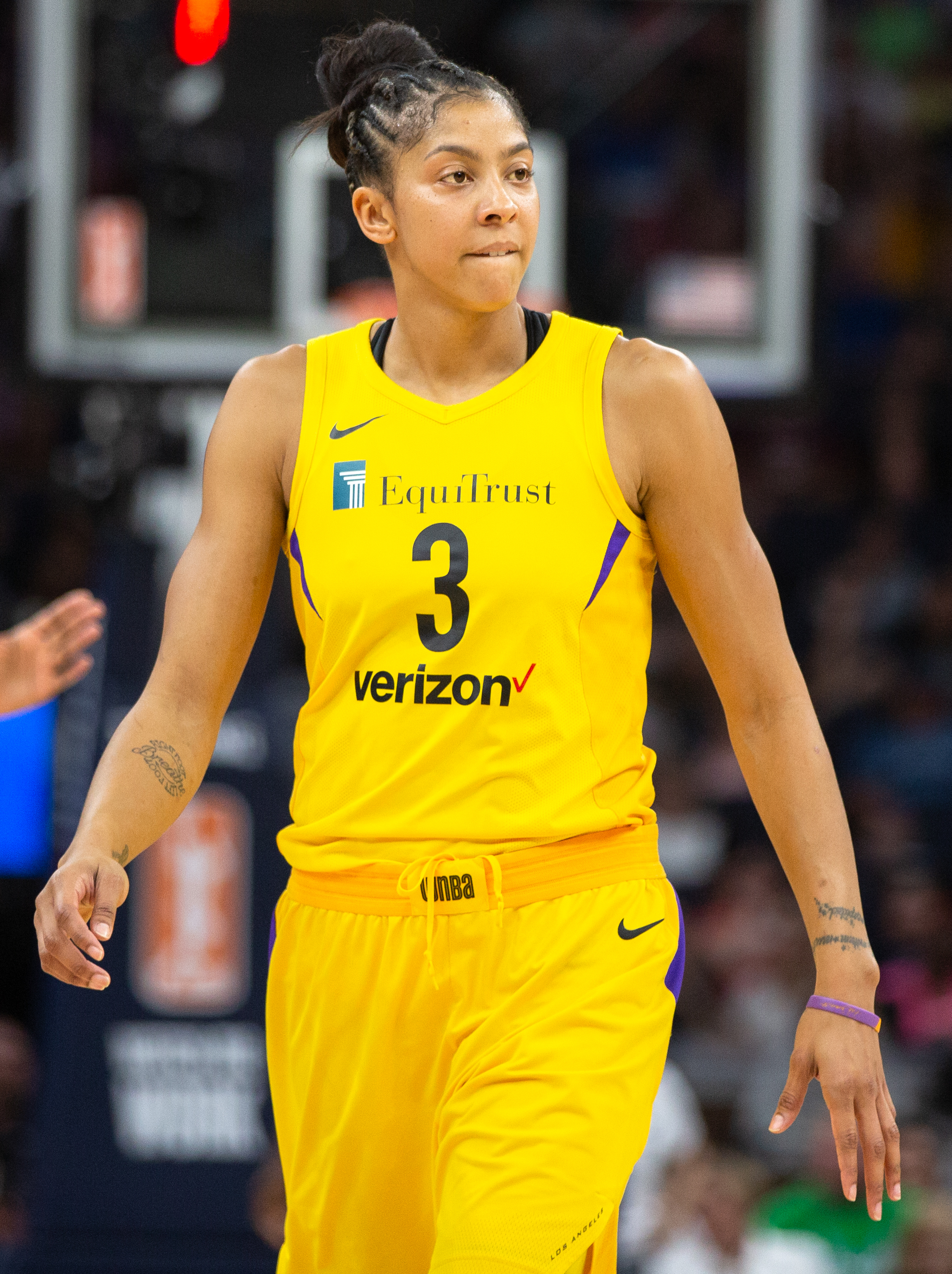
Candace Parker

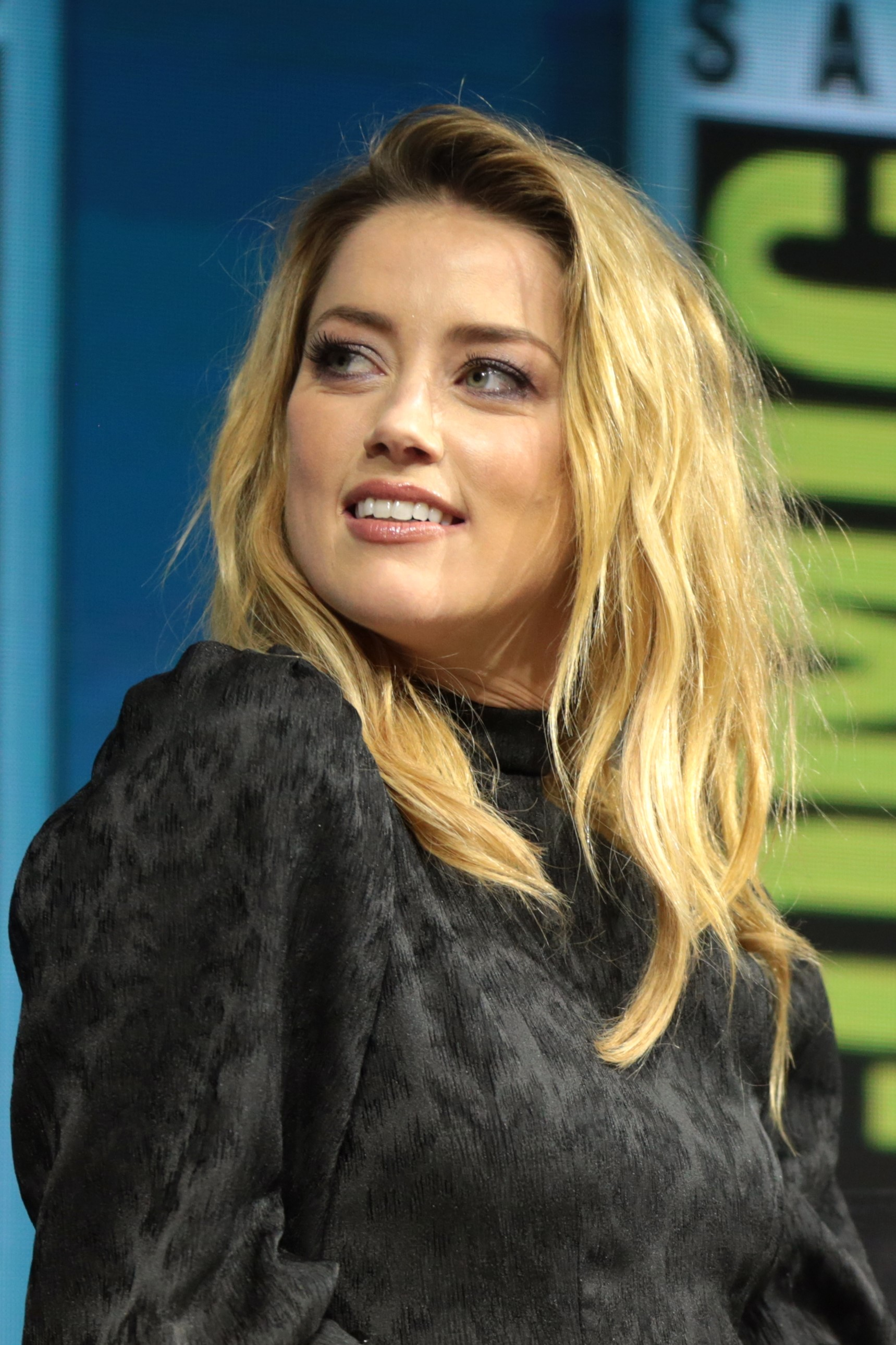
Amber Heard

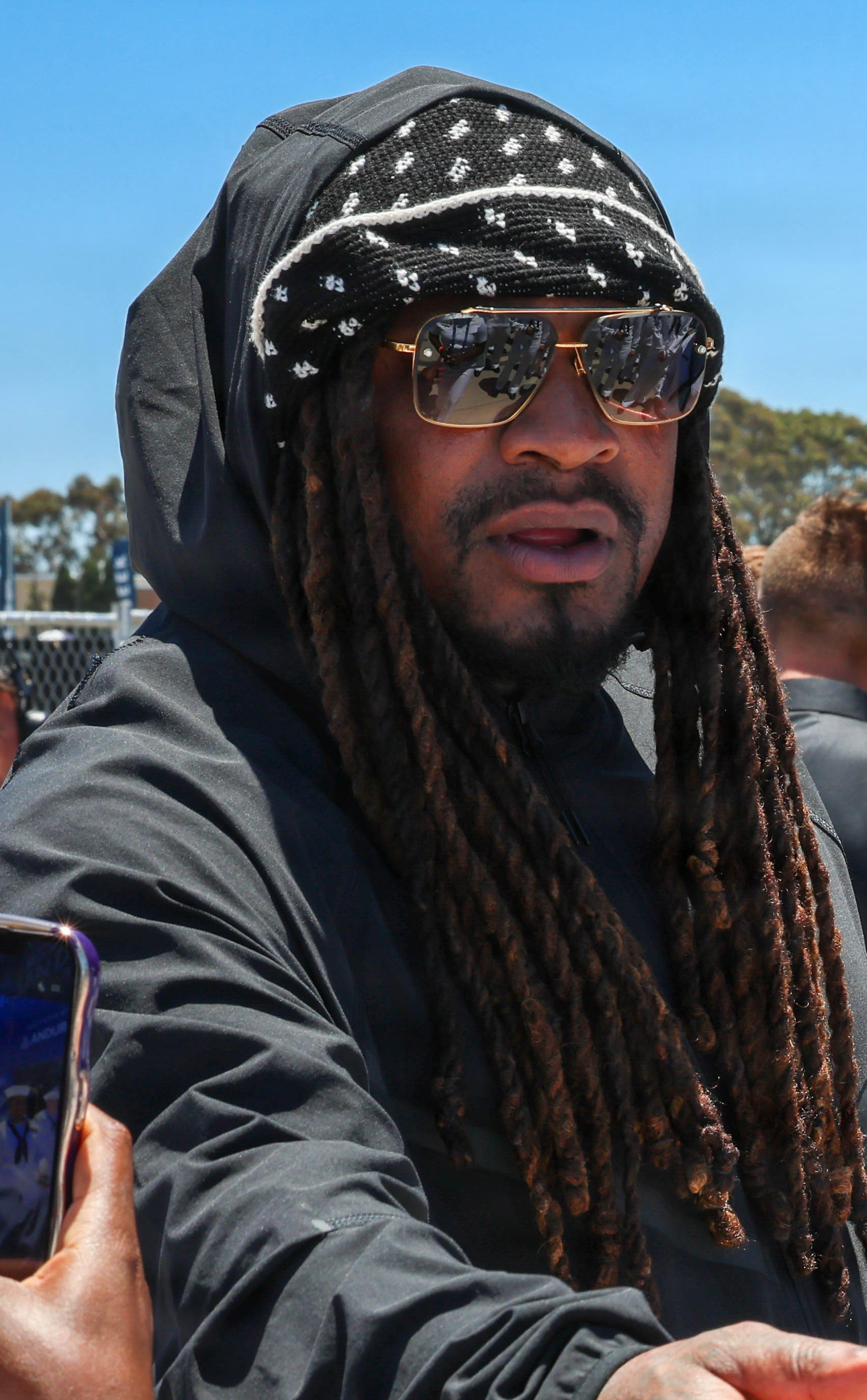
Marshawn Lynch

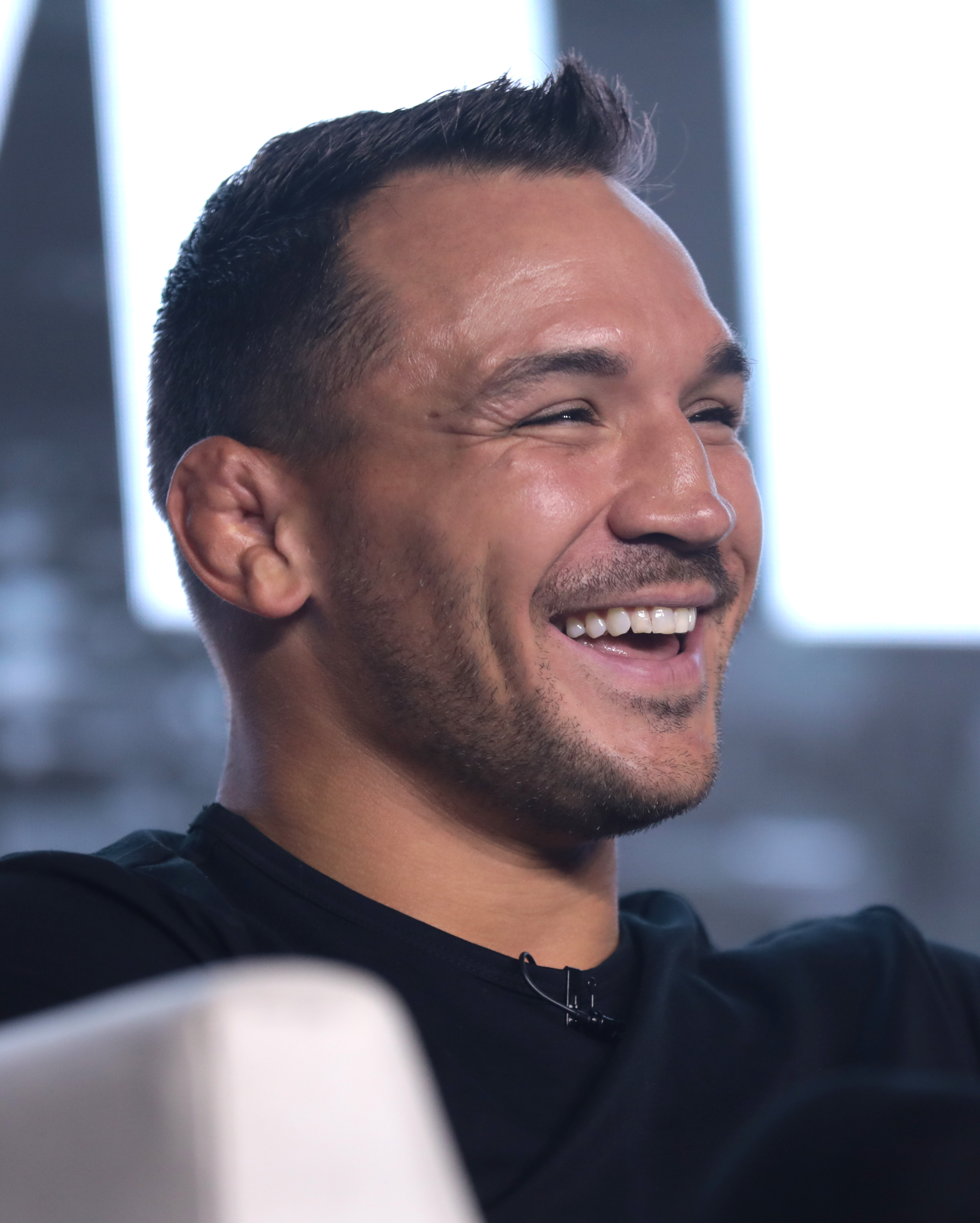
Michael Chandler

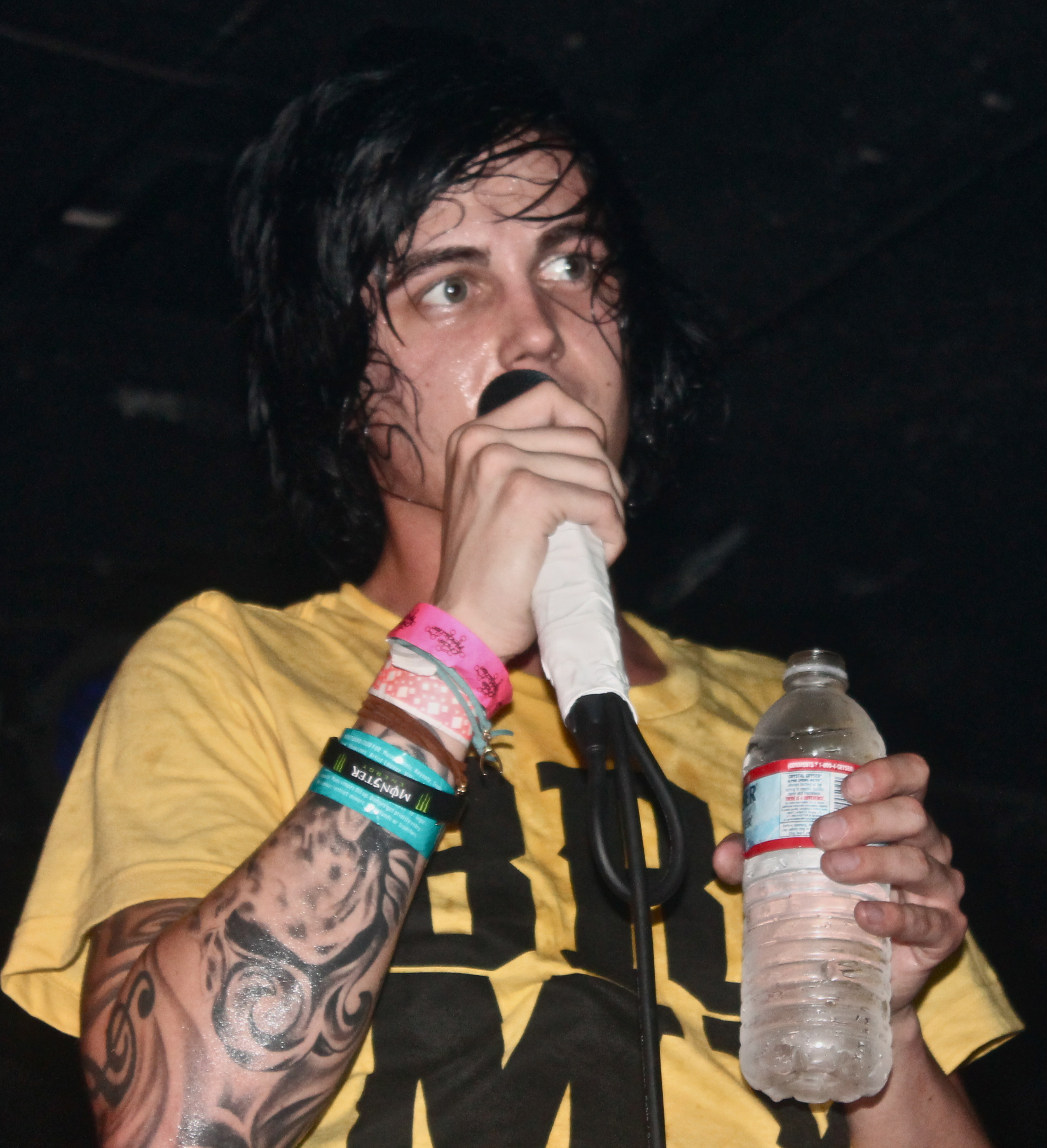
Kellin Quinn

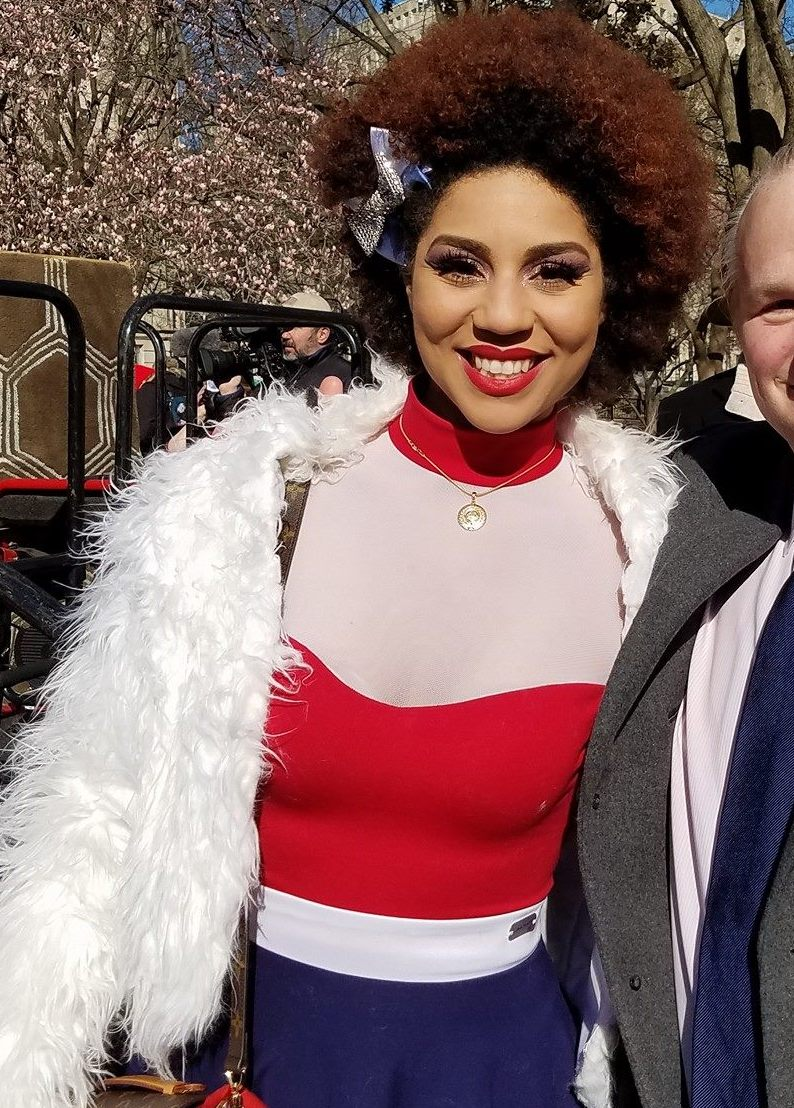
Joy Villa

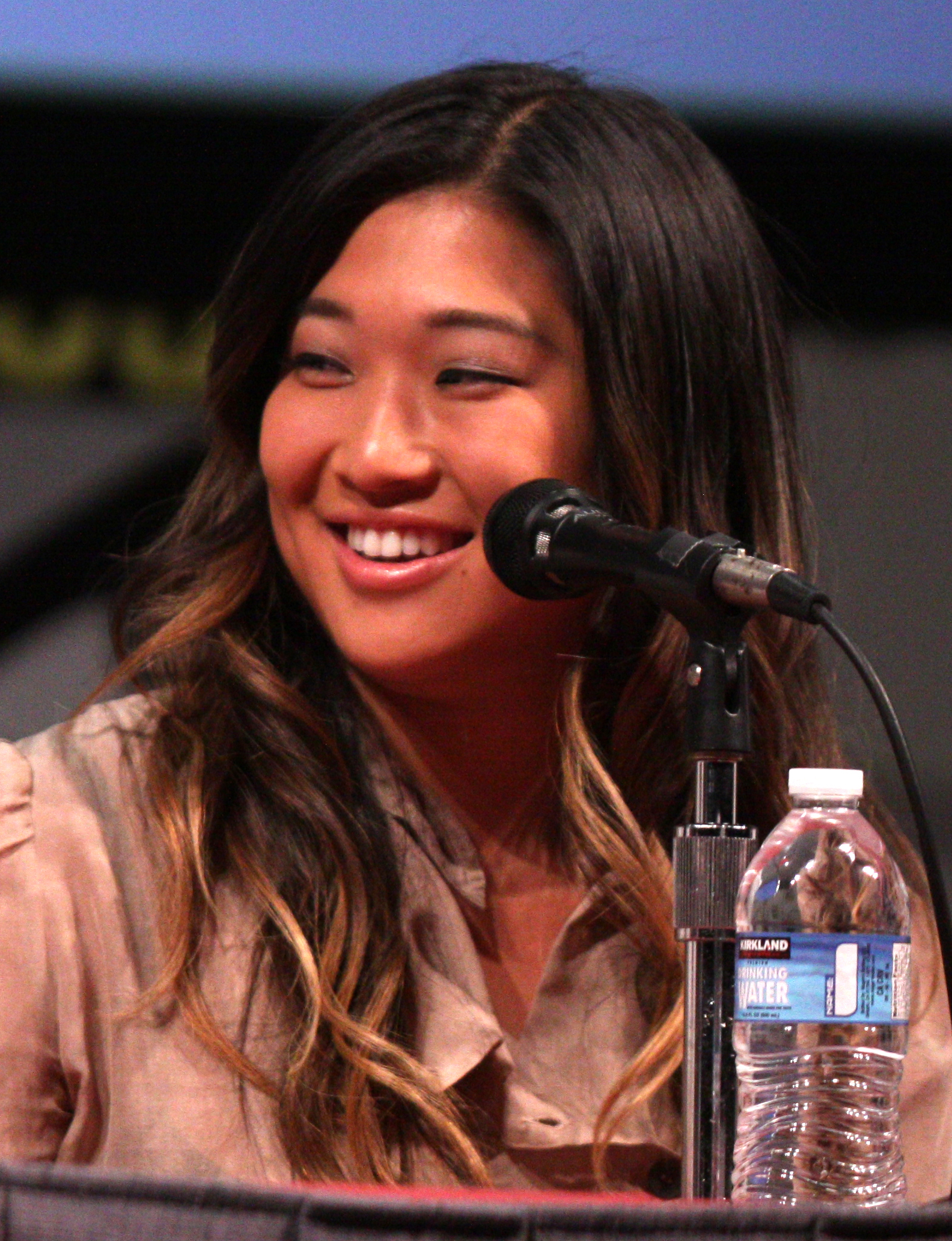
Jenna Ushkowitz

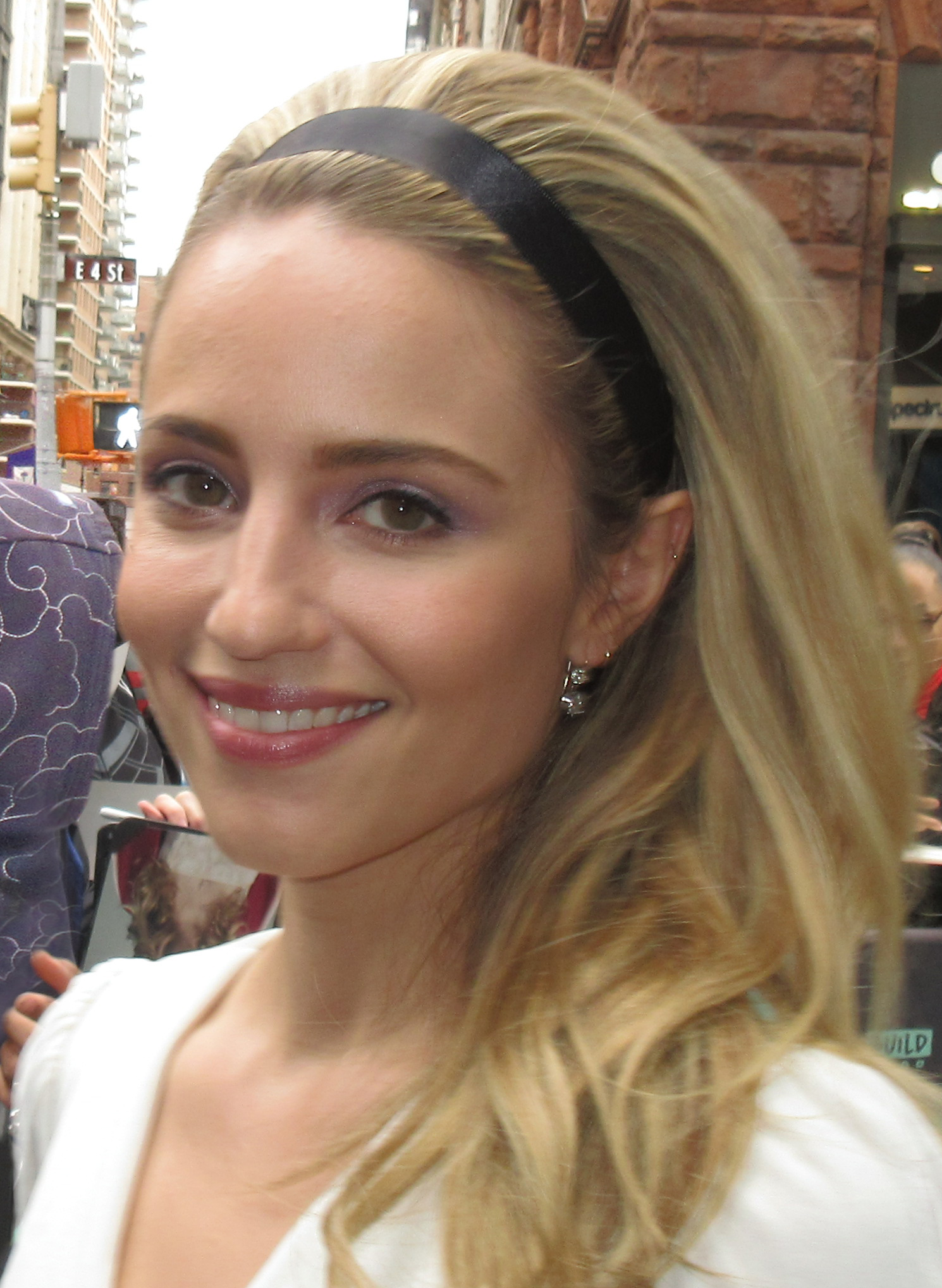
Dianna Agron

- April 1
  - Ellen Hollman, actress
  - Kid Ink, hip-hop singer
  - Hillary Scott, musician
- April 2
  - Mykki Blanco, rapper, performance artist, poet, and activist
  - Marcus Brown, football player
  - Lee DeWyze, rock musician
  - Chris Janson, country singer/songwriter
  - Drew Van Acker, actor
- April 3
  - Amanda Bynes, actress
  - Stephanie Cox, soccer player
  - Whitney Reynolds, television talk show host, podcast host, producer, and philanthropist
- April 4
  - Callista Balko, softball player
  - Nicole Bush, long-distance runner
  - Anthony Carter, baseball player
  - Louis Coleman, baseball player
- April 5
  - Anna Sophia Berglund, actress, model, Playmate, and reality show personality
  - Ryan Brehm, golfer
  - Steve Clevenger, baseball player
  - Charlotte Flair, wrestler, author, and actress
  - Erica Rhodes, actress and comedian
- April 6
  - Kay Adams, sportscaster
  - Aaron Curry, football player
- April 7
  - Mike Anderson, basketball player
  - Brooke Brodack, internet personality
  - Ashleigh Clare-Kearney, gymnast
  - Dustin J. Lee, Marine dog handler and IED detector (d. 2007)
  - Ashlee Palmer, football player
  - Joe Radinovich, politician
  - Jason Ralph, actor and producer
- April 8
  - Cliff Avril, football player
  - Slamtana, Dominican-born baseball player
  - Aviva Silverman, artist and activist
- April 9
  - Atsugiri Jason, comedian
  - Kevin Brock, football player
  - Paul Fanaika, football player
  - Jeff Lerg, hockey player
  - Jordan Masterson, actor
  - Leighton Meester, actress
- April 10
  - Ally Baker, tennis player
  - Candi CdeBaca, politician
- April 11
  - The Twinnies, television personalities and twins
  - Connor Barth, football player
  - Amber Bullock, gospel artist and musician
  - Russ Canzler, baseball player
  - Paul Cauthen, singer/songwriter
  - Brian Clarhaut, soccer player and coach
  - Troy Cole, soccer player
  - Stephanie Pratt, TV personality
- April 12
  - Zerina Akers, fashion stylist and costume designer
  - Joe Amabile, television personality
  - Kira Bilecky, American-born Peruvian footballer
  - Brad Brach, baseball player
  - Matt McGorry, actor and activist
  - Dan Strauss, politician
- April 13 – Lorenzo Cain, baseball player
- April 14
  - Morenike Atunrase, basketball player
  - Quianna Chaney, basketball player
  - Steve Clark, soccer player
  - Max Unger, football player
- April 15 – Rudy Carpenter, football player
- April 16
  - Joanna Beasley, Christian pop artist
  - Sufe Bradshaw, actress
  - Kristiana Rae Colón, poet, playwright, actor, and educator
- April 17 – Brad Knott, politician
- April 18
  - Billy Butler, baseball player
  - Chris Crane, football player
  - Maurice Edu, soccer player
- April 19
  - Antoine Caldwell, football player
  - Jake Carter, football player and wrestler
  - Candace Parker, basketball player
  - Karlee Leilani Perez, wrestler, model, and actress
- April 20 – Jess Todd, baseball player
- April 21 – Audra Cohen, tennis player
- April 22
  - Amanda Berry, author and abduction survivor
  - Darren Fells, football player
  - Amber Heard, actress
  - Marshawn Lynch, football player
  - Chuck Taylor, wrestler
- April 23 – Jessie Godderz, wrestler
- April 24
  - Brian Barnwell, politician
  - Michael Chandler, mixed martial artist
  - Cameron Cogburn, cyclist
  - Eli Cook, singer/songwriter and guitarist
  - Aaron Cunningham, baseball player
  - Kellin Quinn, singer and frontman for Sleeping With Sirens
- April 25
  - John DeLuca, actor and singer
  - Gwen Jorgensen, triathlete
  - Derek Thorn, stock car racer
  - Joy Villa, singer/songwriter
- April 26
  - Morgan Cox, football player
  - Cris Crotz, beauty pageant titleholder
  - Sean Evans, YouTuber and producer
  - Braden Gellenthien, compound bow archer
  - Mortty Ivy, football player
  - Aaron Meeks, actor
- April 27 – Trindon Holliday, football player
- April 28
  - Ashley Bland Manlove, politician
  - Dave Bliss, basketball coach
  - Collin Cowgill, baseball player
  - Dillon Gee, baseball player
  - Ryan Saunders, basketball coach
  - Jenna Ushkowitz, South Korean-born actress, singer and podcast host
- April 29
  - Renee Alway, fashion model
  - Junior Aumavae, football player
  - Sean Backman, hockey player
  - Jennifer Chieng, mixed martial artist
  - Black Cobain, rapper
  - Chris Farren, indie punk musician
  - Justin Flom, magician
  - Dustin Hazelett, mixed martial artist
- April 30 – Dianna Agron, actress, singer and dancer

=== May ===
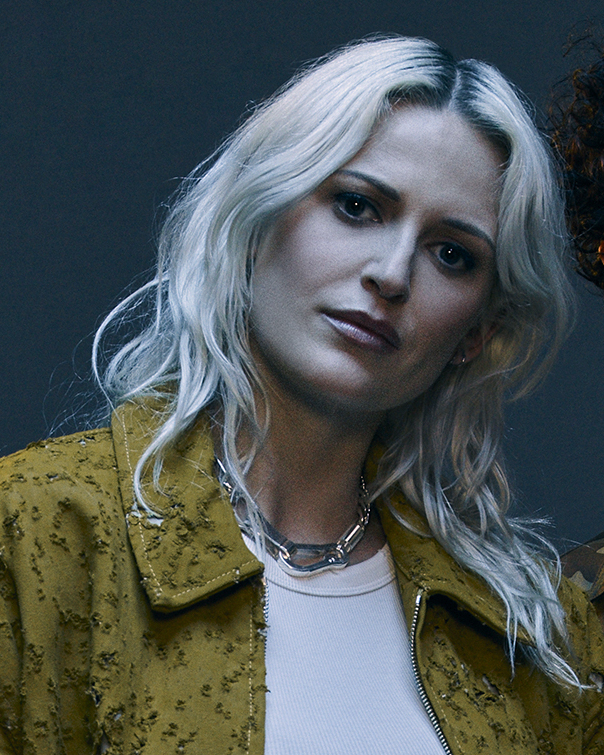
Emily Armstrong

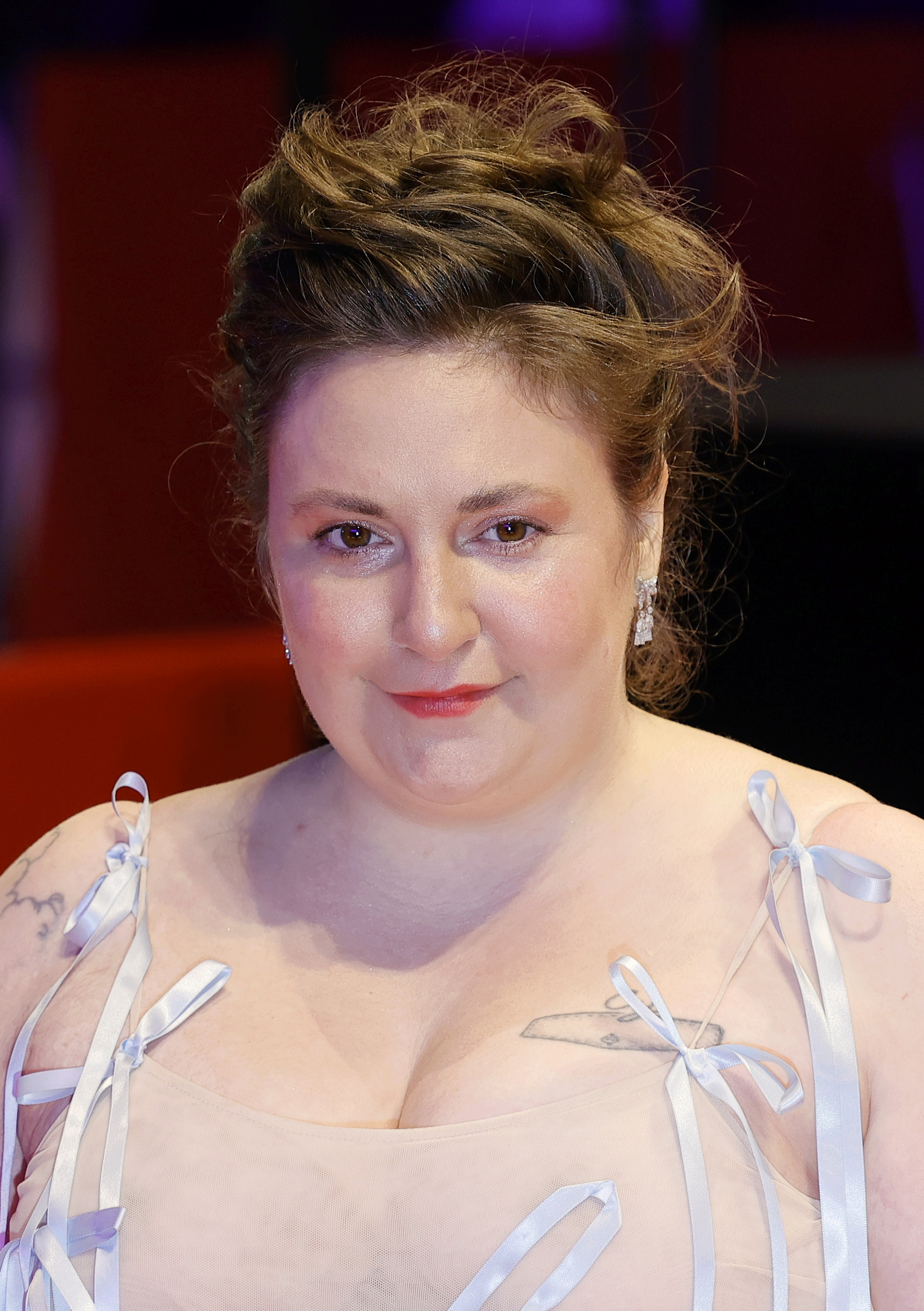
Lena Dunham

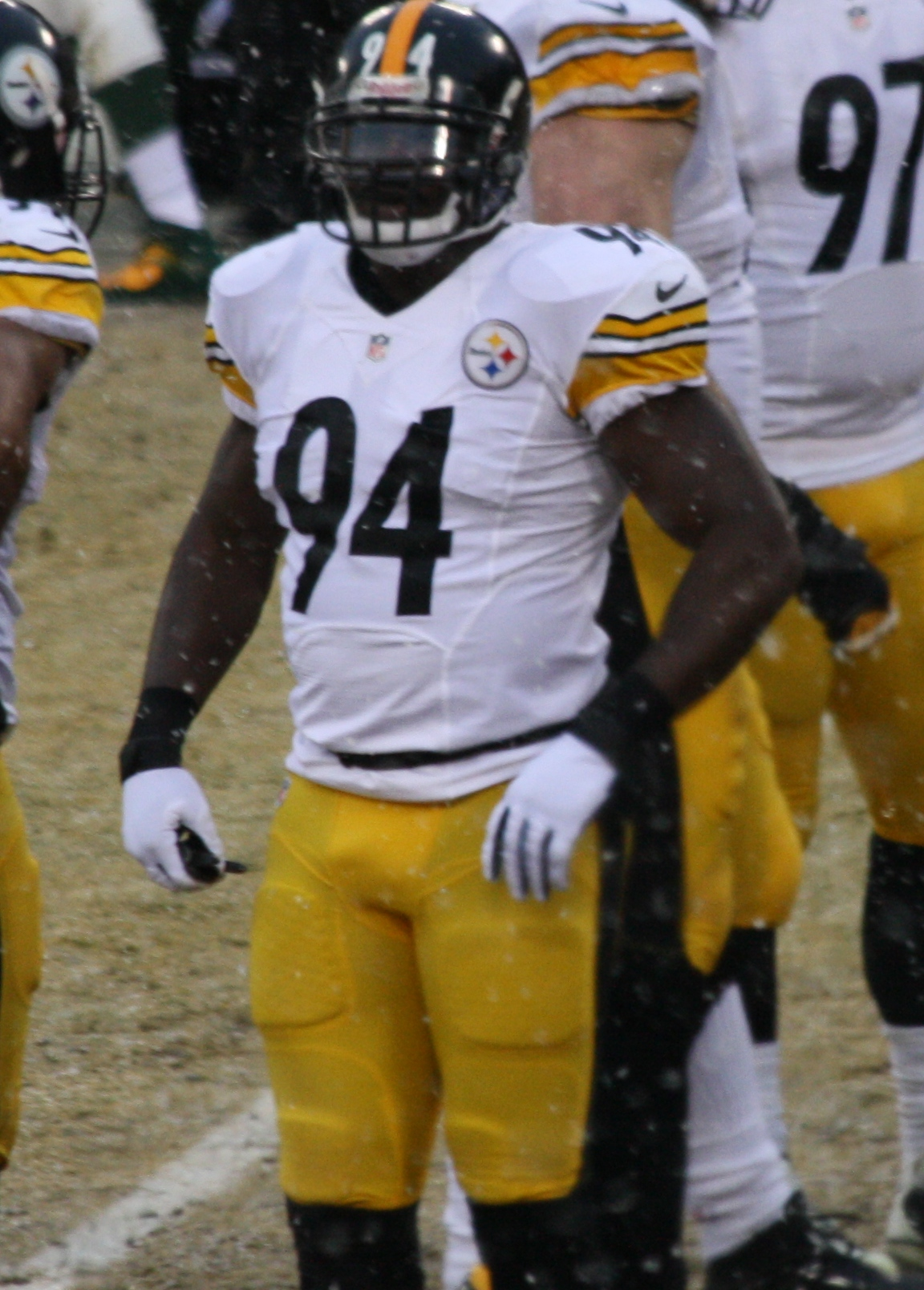
Lawrence Timmons

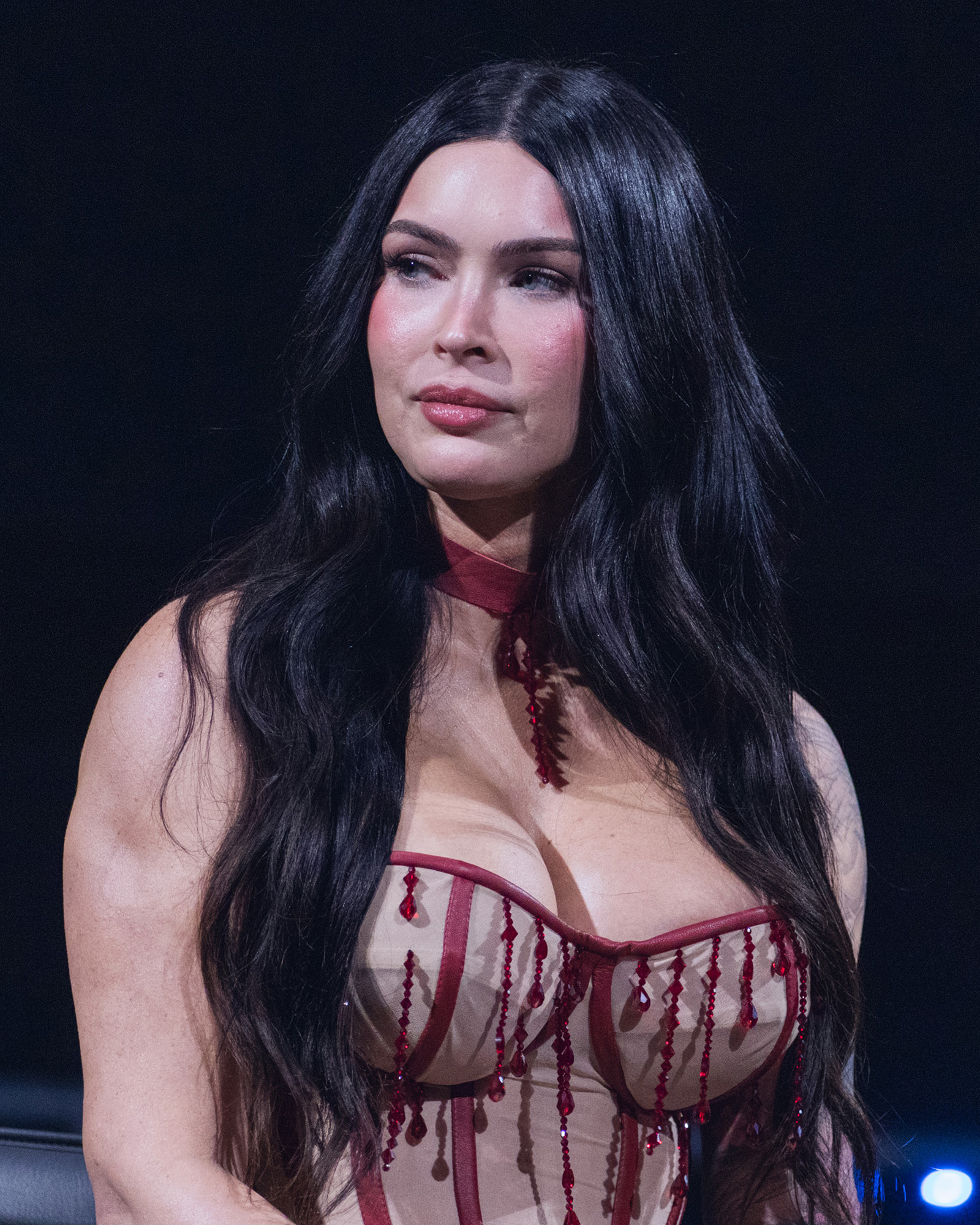
Megan Fox

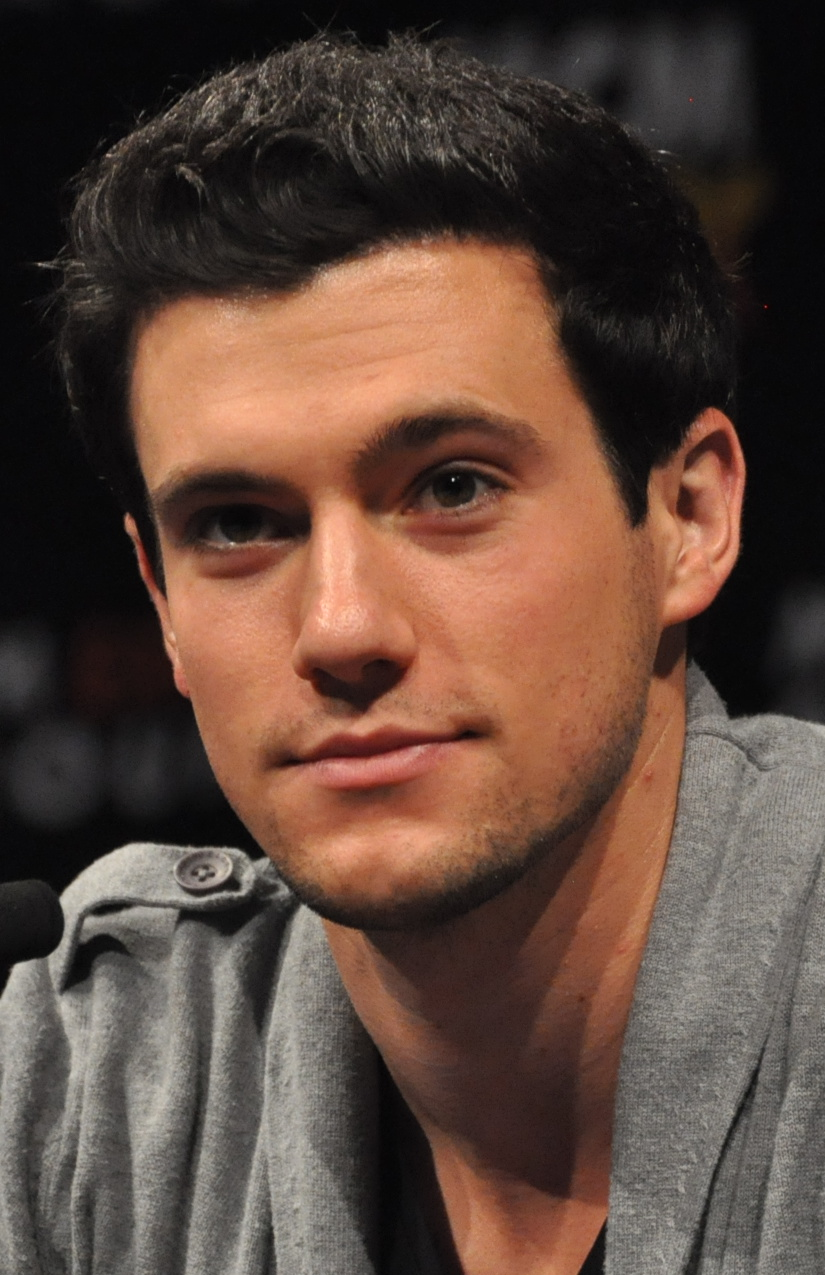
Drew Roy

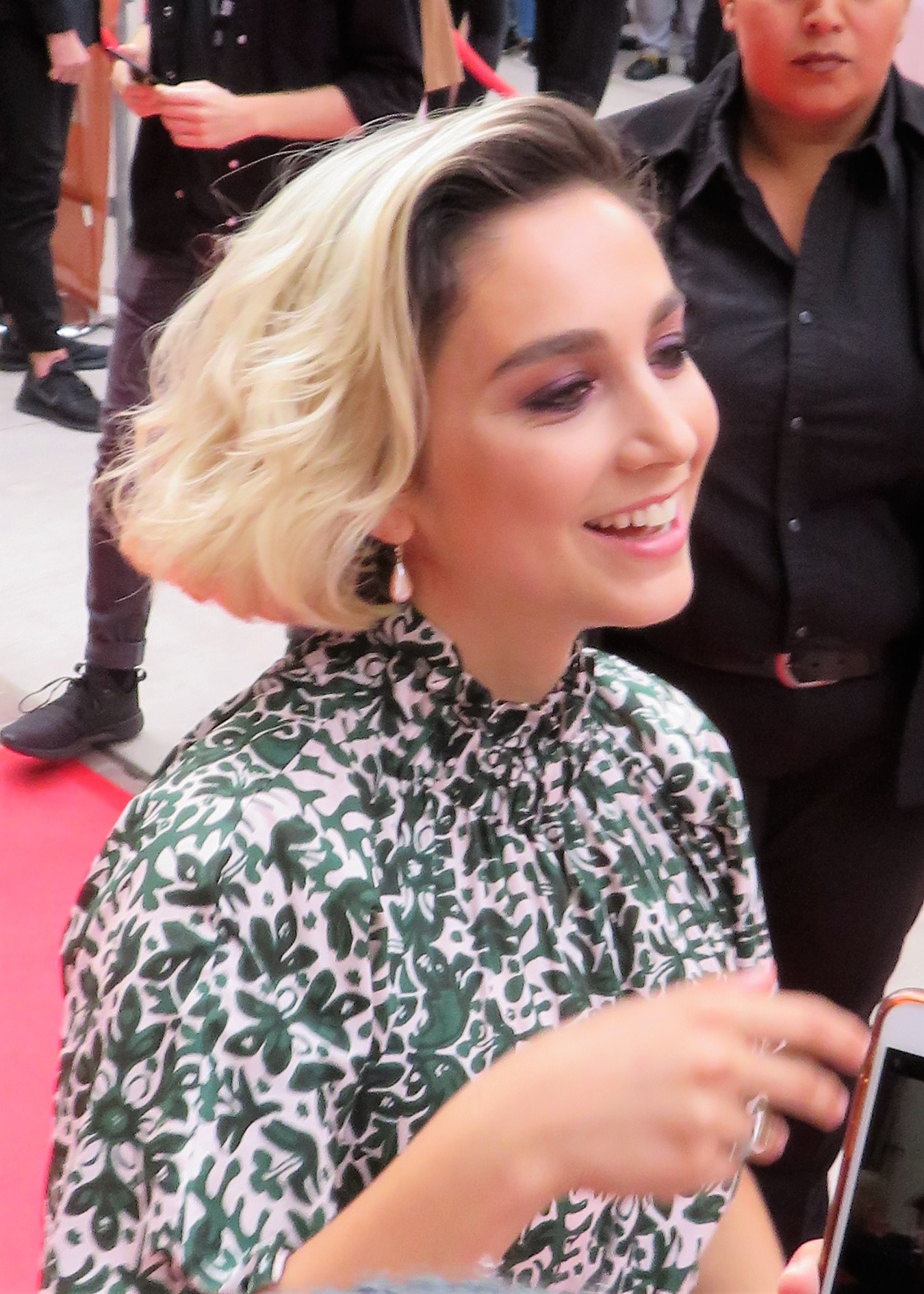
Molly Ephraim

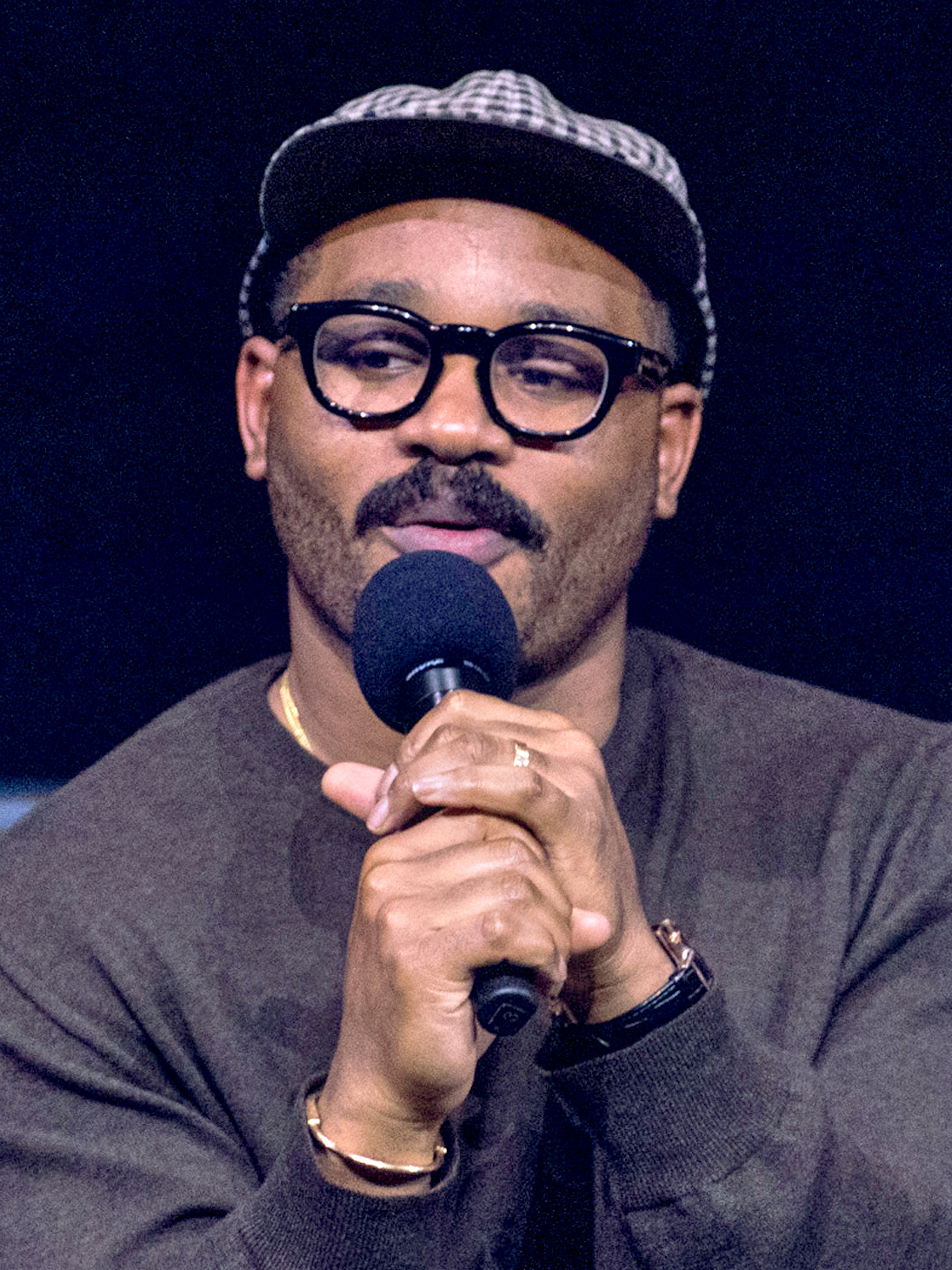
Ryan Coogler

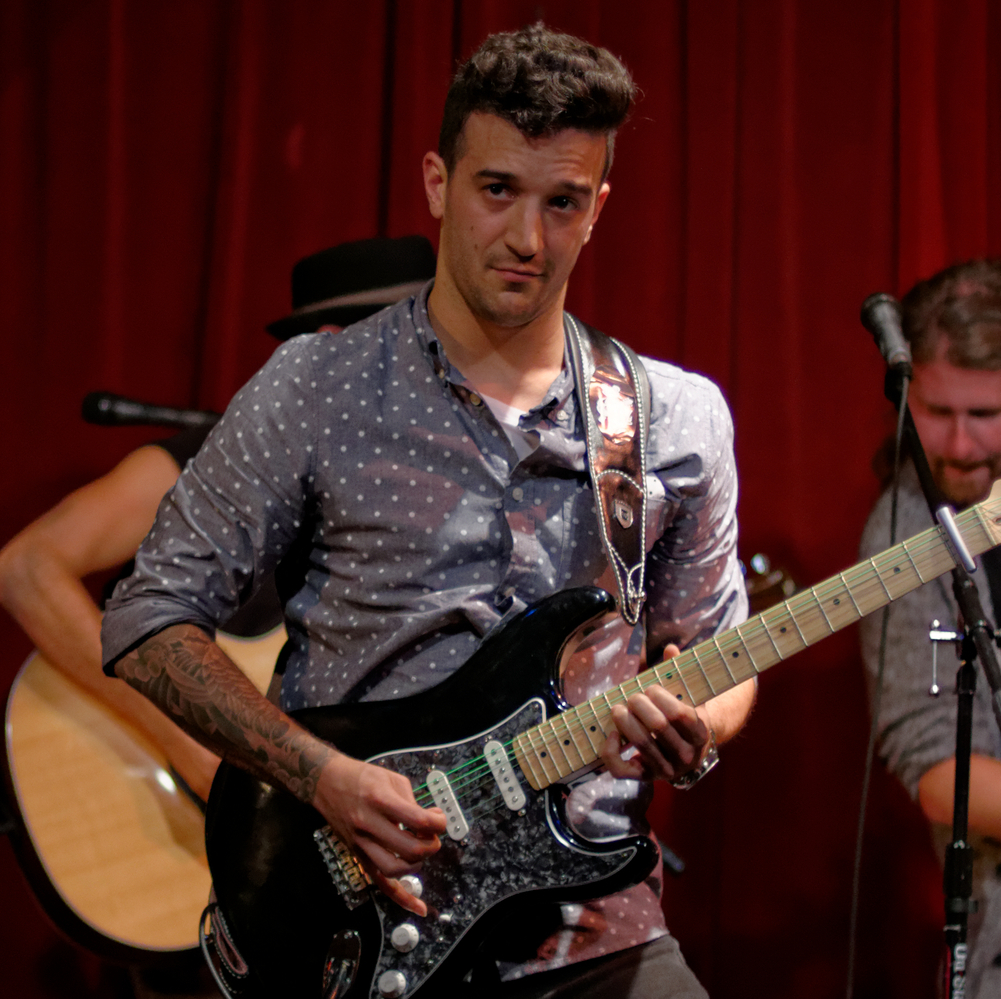
Mark Ballas

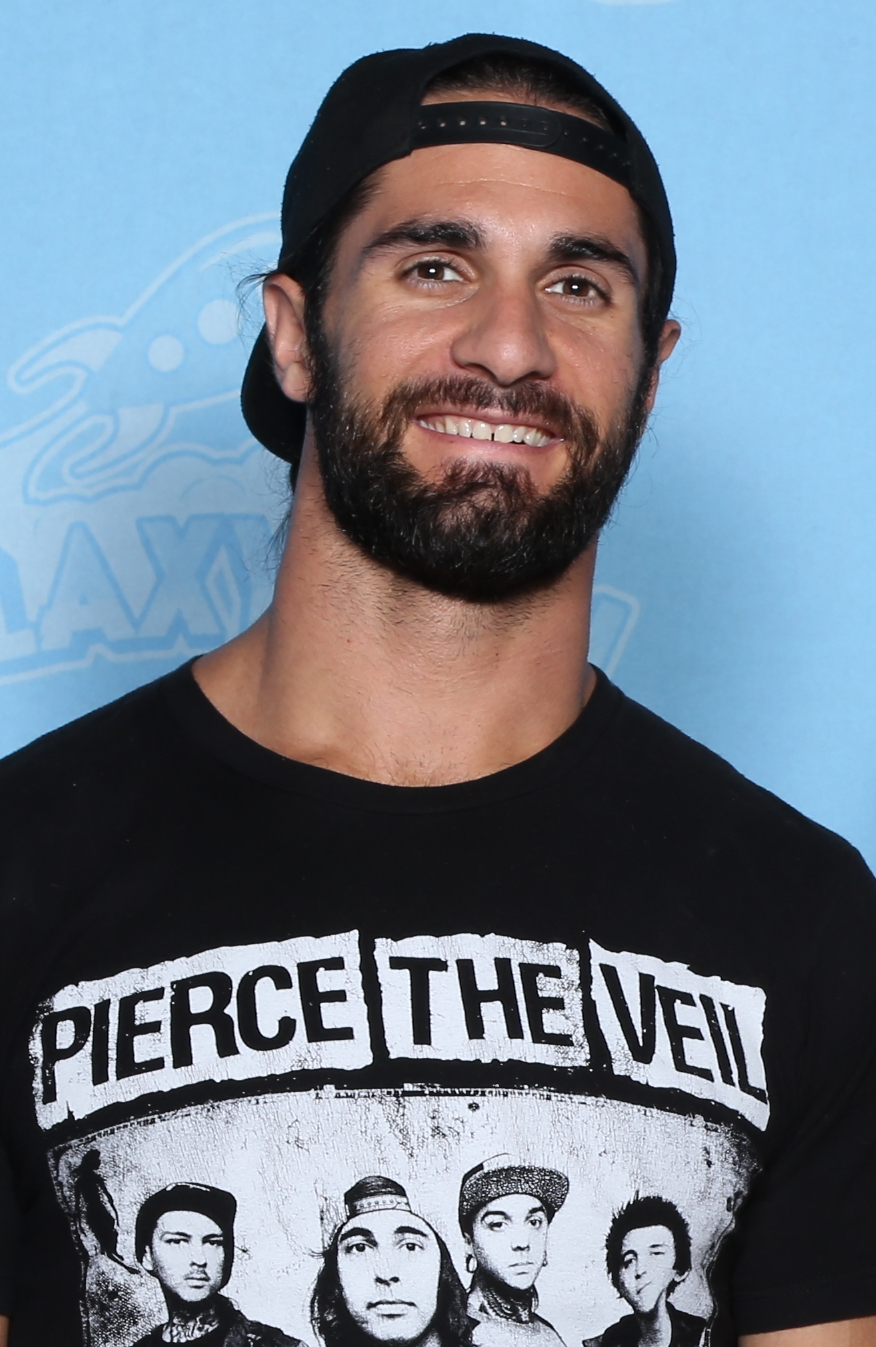
Seth Rollins

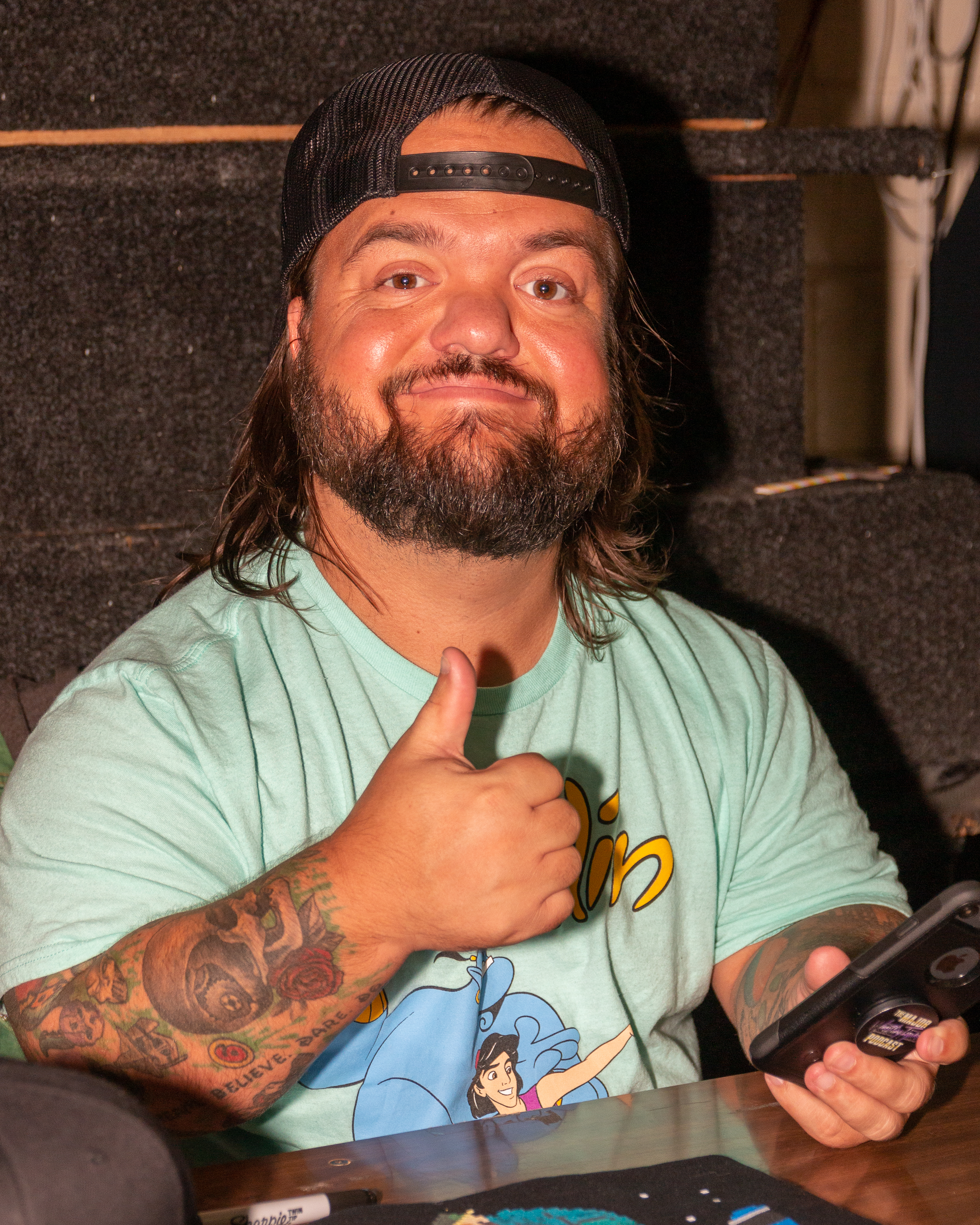
Hornswoggle

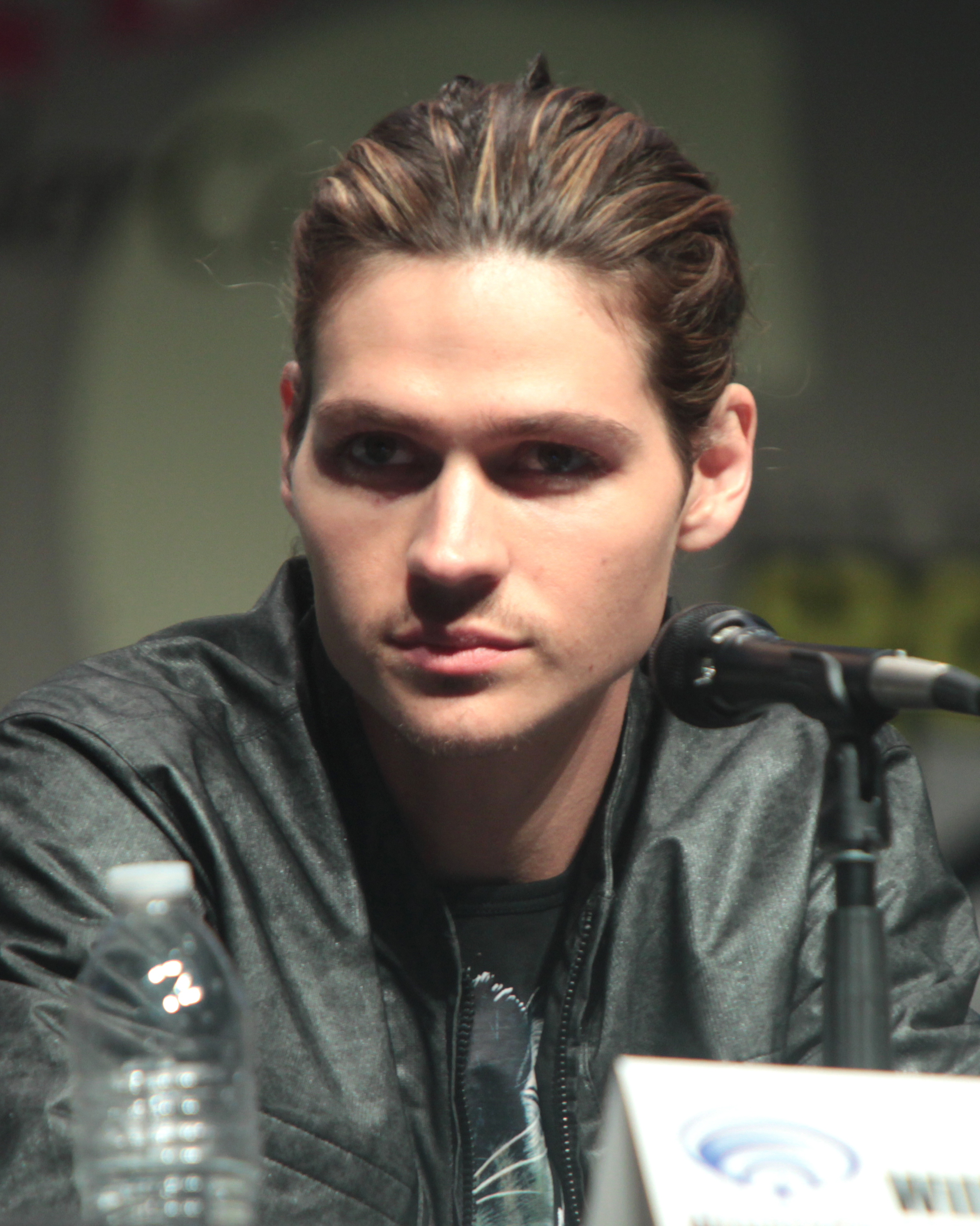
Will Peltz

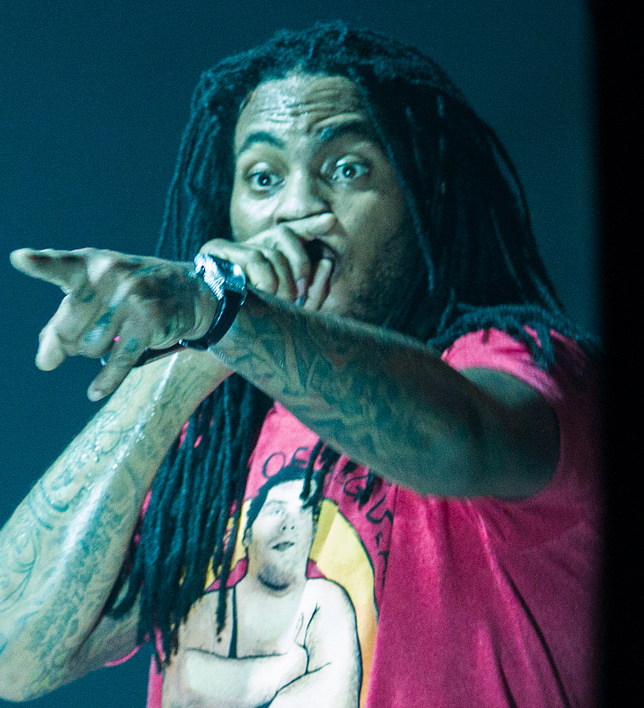
Waka Flocka Flame

- May 1
  - Bob Andrzejczak, politician
  - Arkeith Brown, football player
  - Dakota Cochrane, mixed martial artist
  - Chris Coy, actor
  - Cassie Jaye, actress and film director
  - Abby Huntsman, journalist
- May 2
  - Emily Hart, actress and voice actress
  - Thomas McDonell, actor, musician, and artist
- May 3 – Homer Bailey, baseball player
- May 4 – Nate Novarro, drummer for Cobra Starship
- May 5
  - Russell Allen, football player
  - Will Anderson, singer/songwriter
  - Bart Baker, internet personality and entertainer
- May 6
  - Sam Alvey, mixed martial artist
  - Emily Armstrong, singer/songwriter and frontwoman for Linkin Park (2024-present)
  - Ryan Cordeiro, soccer player
  - C. J. Spillman, football player
  - Sasheer Zamata, actress and comedian
- May 7
  - Nate Prosser, hockey player
  - Frances Quinlan, singer/songwriter
  - Craig Steltz, football player
- May 8
  - Alex Deibold, Olympic snowboarder
  - Ray Feinga, football player
  - Laura Spencer, actress
  - Garrett Temple, basketball player
- May 9
  - Taylor Chace, ice sledge hockey player
  - Yu-kai Chou, Taiwanese-born entrepreneur, author, speaker, business consultant, and experience designer
  - FPSRussia, podcaster and YouTuber
  - Grace Gummer, actress
  - John Pfeiffer, politician
  - Daniel Schlereth, baseball player
- May 10
  - Amanda Cinalli, soccer player
  - Geoff Foster, politician
- May 11
  - Tia Ballard, voice actress and director
  - Scott Bauhs, runner
  - Ben Johnson, football coach
- May 12
  - Dana Belben, voice actress, animator, screenwriter, effects artist, and comedian
  - George Josten, soccer player
  - Cara Maria Sorbello, television personality
- May 13
  - Morgan Arritola, Olympic cross country skier
  - Jared Boll, hockey player
  - Lena Dunham, actress and producer
- May 14
  - David Crowley, politician
  - Madi Diaz, singer/songwriter
  - Lawrence Timmons, football player
- May 15
  - Brandon Barnes, baseball player
  - Thomas Brown, football player and coach
  - Claire Buffie, photographer and beauty pageant winner
  - Josh Johnson, football player
  - Andy Levitre, football player
- May 16
  - Anthony Birchak, mixed martial artist
  - Megan Fox, actress and model
  - Drew Roy, actor
  - Jacob Zachar, actor
- May 17
  - David Benefield, poker player
  - Raehann Bryce-Davis, mezzo-soprano and producer
  - Tahj Mowry, actor
  - Jaime Preciado, bassist and vocalist for Pierce the Veil
- May 18
  - Ezra Cohen-Watnick, intelligence official in the United States National Security Council
  - Tony Succar, Peruvian-born musician, producer, and composer
- May 19
  - Dominic Berger, hurdler
  - Brandon Carr, football player
  - Mario Chalmers, basketball player
  - Danny Havoc, wrestler (d. 2020)
  - Eric Lloyd, actor, comedian, musician, and producer
- May 20
  - Alessandra Biaggi, politician
  - Samra Brouk, politician
  - Yolanda Brown, singer (d. 2007)
  - Louisa Krause, actress
  - Richard Nelson, politician
  - Marcus Titus, Olympic swimmer
- May 21
  - Sarah Gibson, composer and pianist (d. 2024)
  - Omar Hussein, content creator and media and communications consultant
  - Ricardo Lockette, football player
  - Myra, pop singer
- May 22
  - Devin Clark, football player
  - Collin Cowgill, baseball player
  - Julian Edelman, football player
  - Molly Ephraim, actress
  - Sean Rad, entrepreneur and co-founder of Tinder
  - Shann Schillinger, football player
  - A. Q. Shipley, football player
- May 23
  - Jimmy Baron, basketball player
  - Andrew Beck, artist and musician
  - Steve Billirakis, poker player
  - Nico Colaluca, footballer
  - Ryan Coogler, film director, producer, and screenwriter
  - Chad Hall, football player
  - Tim Hightower, football player
  - Jordan Zimmermann, baseball player
- May 24
  - Mark Ballas, dancer, actor, and musician
  - Bryon Bishop, football player
  - Tony Carter, football player
- May 25
  - Andrew Golden, perpetrator of the 1998 Westside Middle School shooting (d. 2019)
  - Octavio Pisano, Mexican-born actor
- May 26
  - Beau Bell, football player
  - Jerome Boyd, football player
  - Tyler Haskins, hockey player
  - Jeremy Stephens, mixed martial artist
  - Elizabeth Tabish, actress
- May 27
  - Matt Barnes, football player and coach
  - Will Campuzano, Mexican-born mixed martial artist
- May 28
  - Alex Feather Akimov, Russian-born guitarist and composer
  - Adrian Clark, boxer
  - Joseph Cross, actor
  - Bryant Dunston, basketball player
  - Britt McHenry, sports reporter
  - Seth Rollins, wrestler
- May 29
  - Daryl Campbell, politician
  - Maurice Crum Jr., football player
  - Danny Eslick, motorcycle racer
  - Hornswoggle, wrestler and actor
- May 30
  - Tony Campana, baseball player
  - Jade Novah, singer and internet personality
  - Will Peltz, actor
- May 31
  - Jordan Angeli, soccer player
  - Brooke Castile, figure skater
  - Waka Flocka Flame, rapper

=== June ===
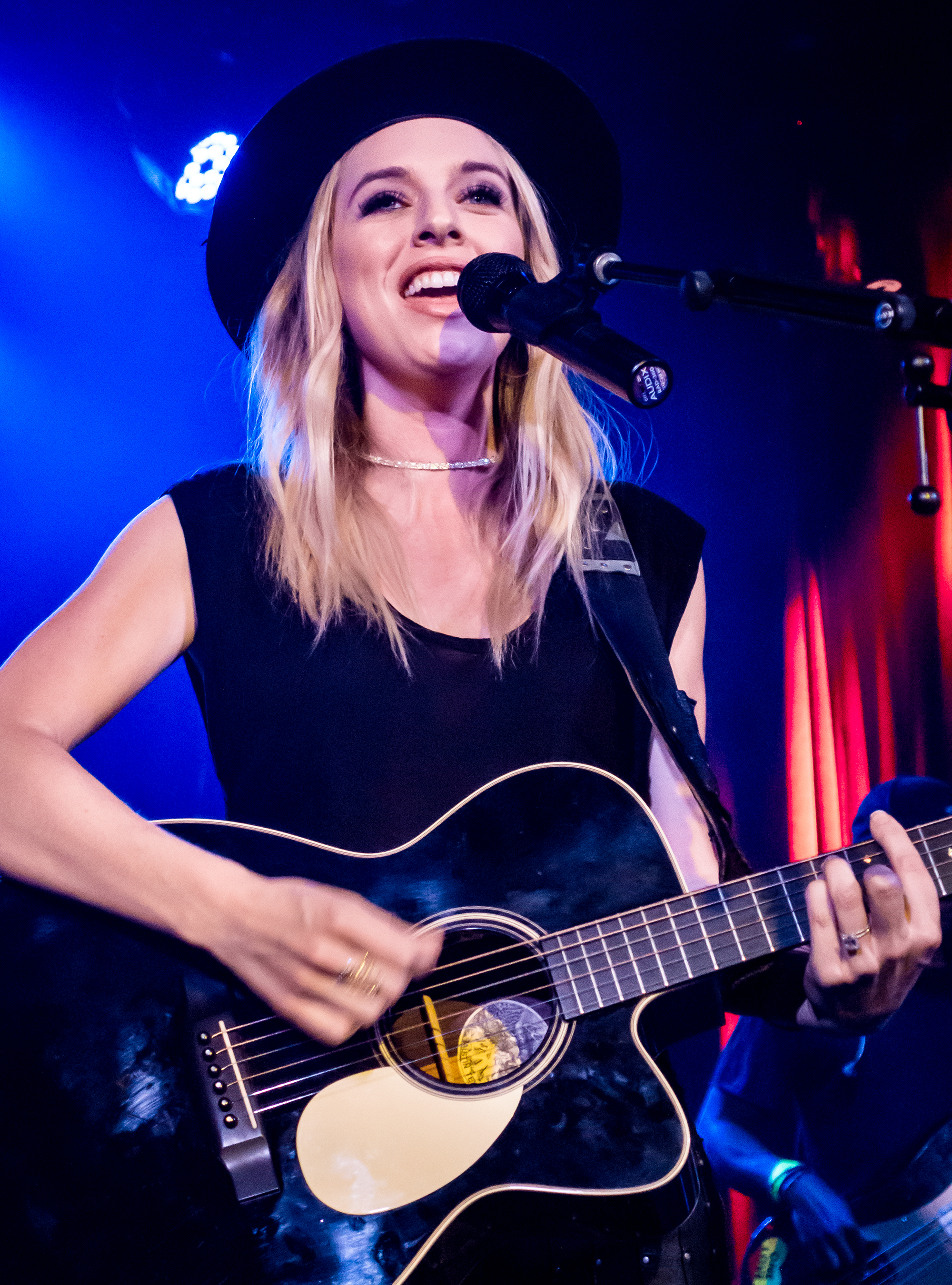
ZZ Ward

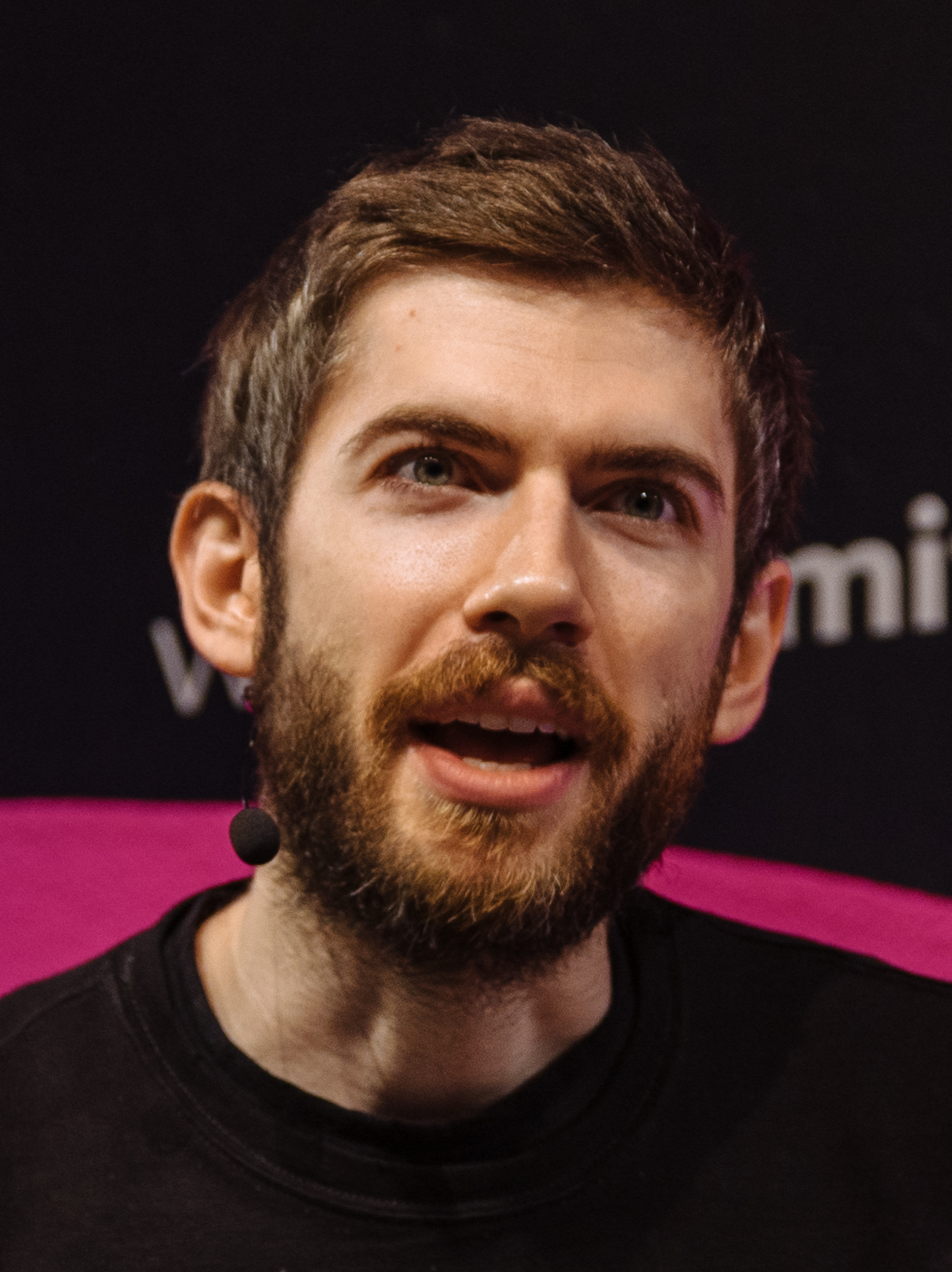
David Karp

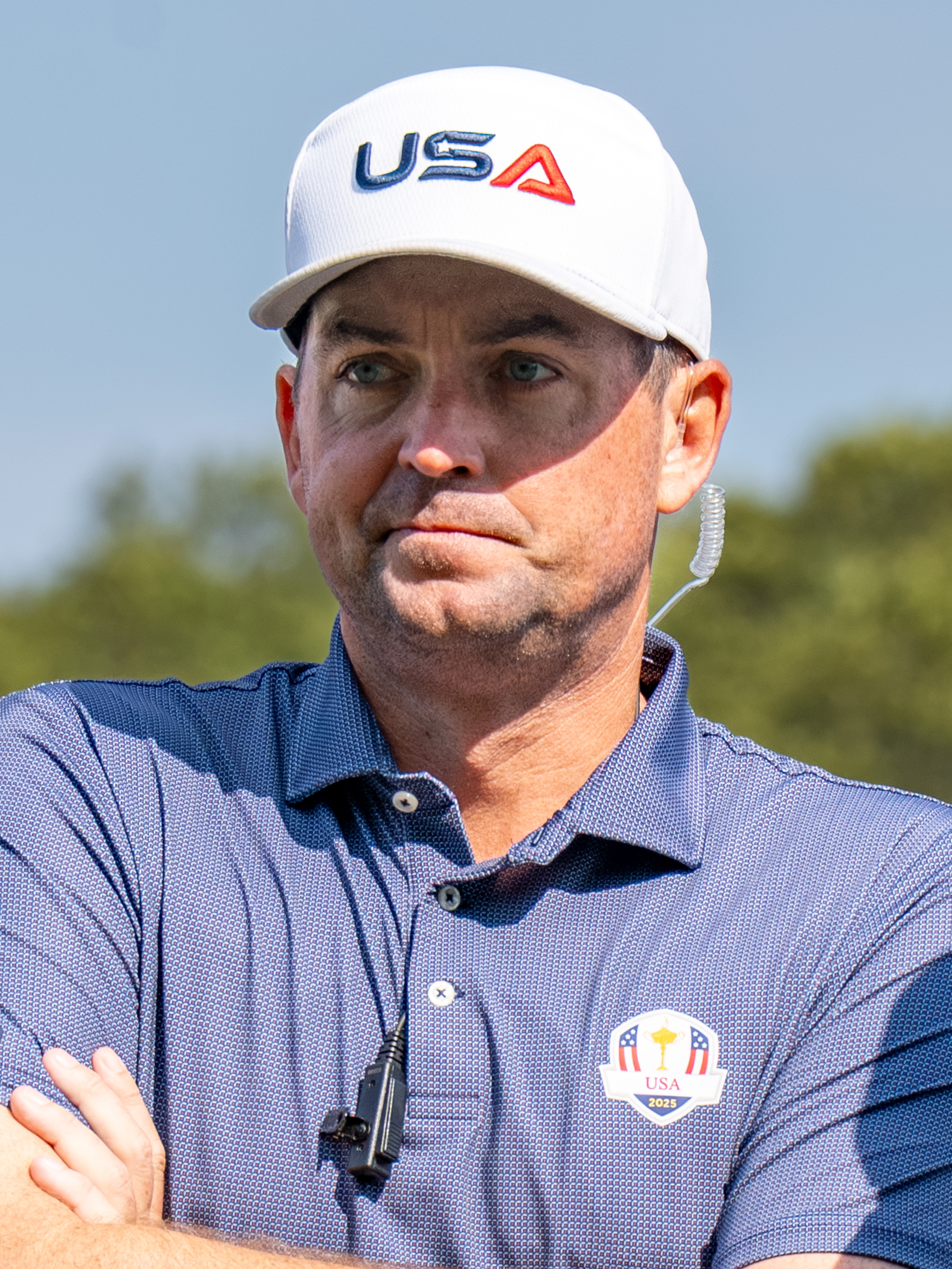
Keegan Bradley

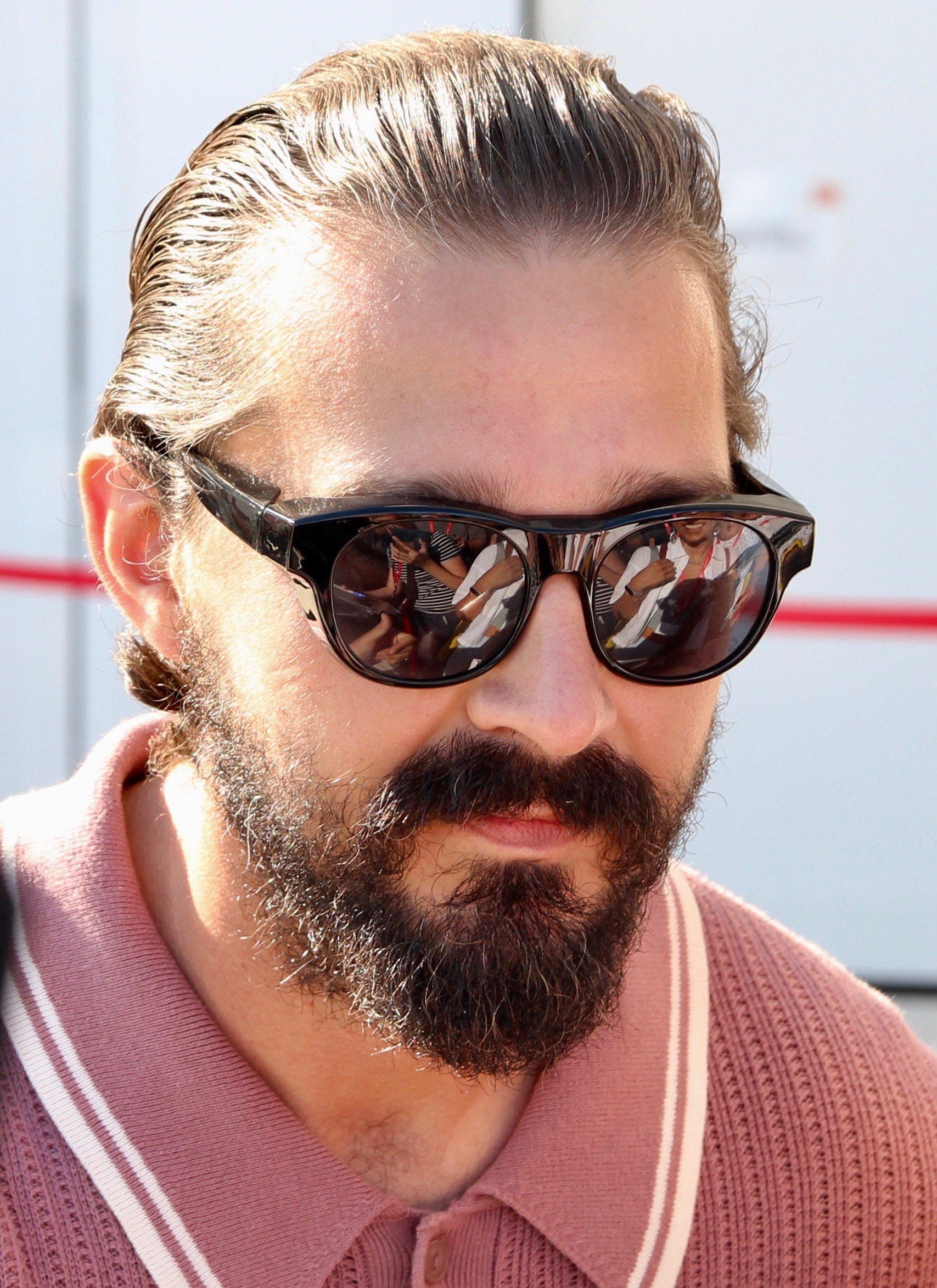
Shia LaBeouf

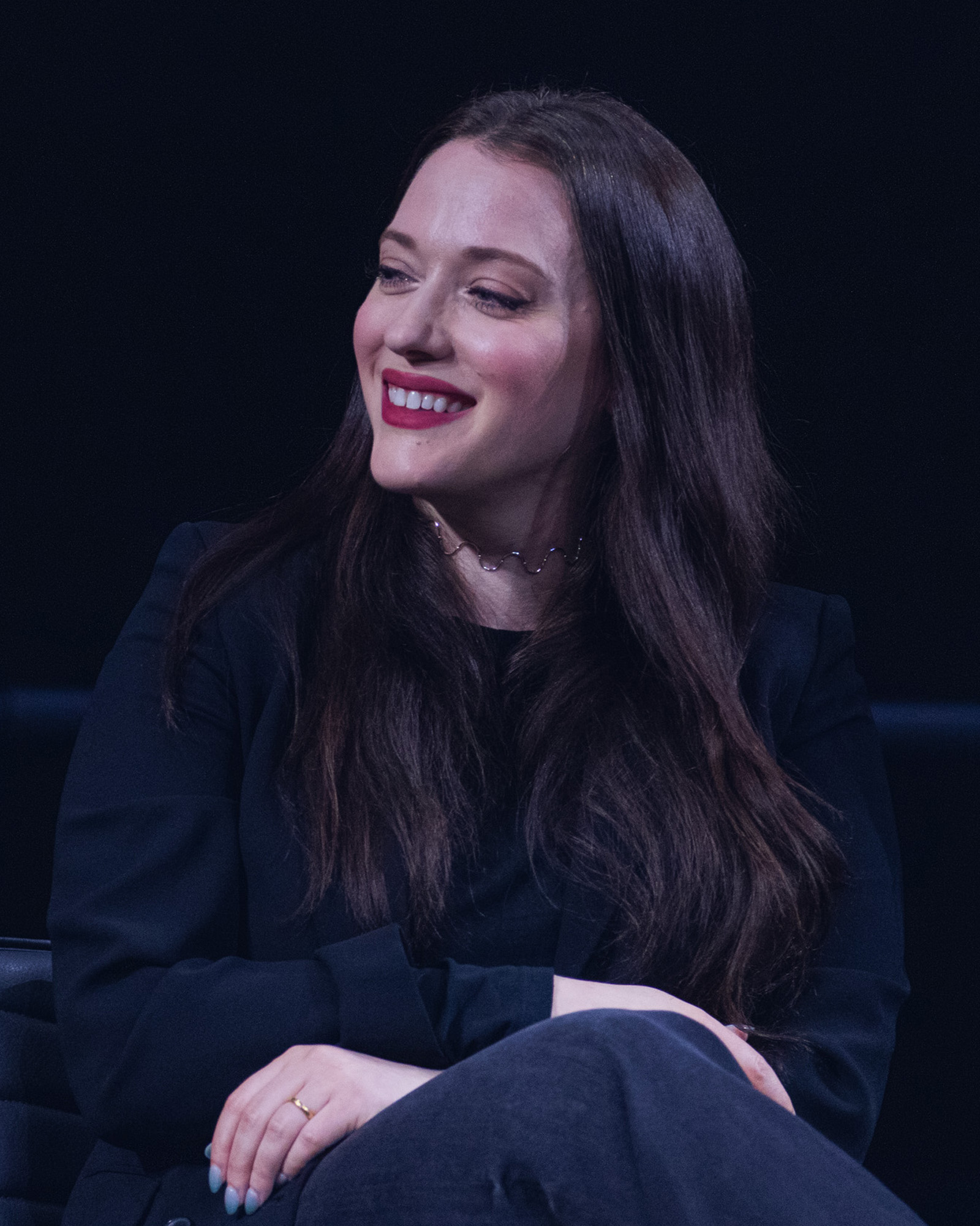
Kat Dennings

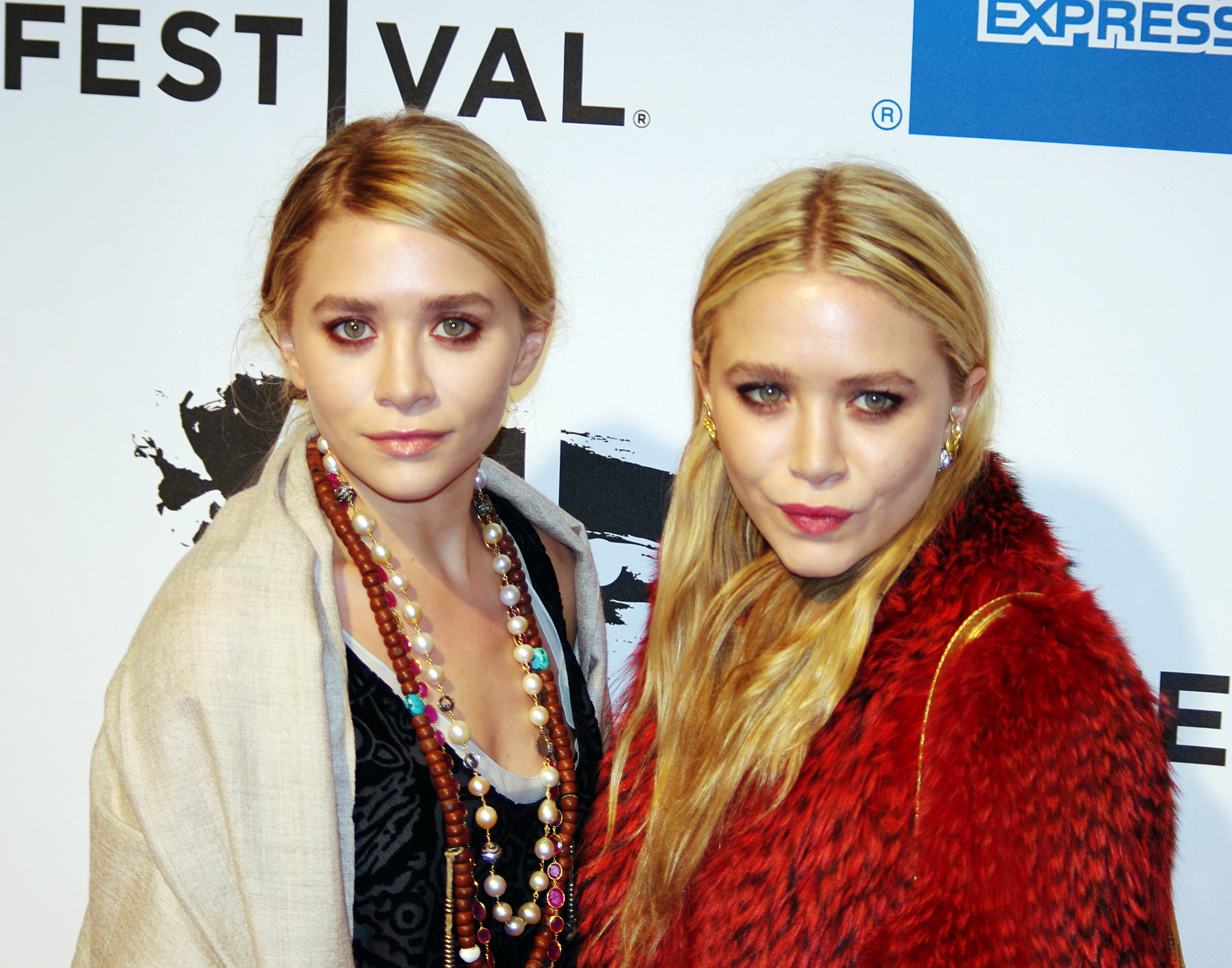
Ashley and Mary-Kate Olsen

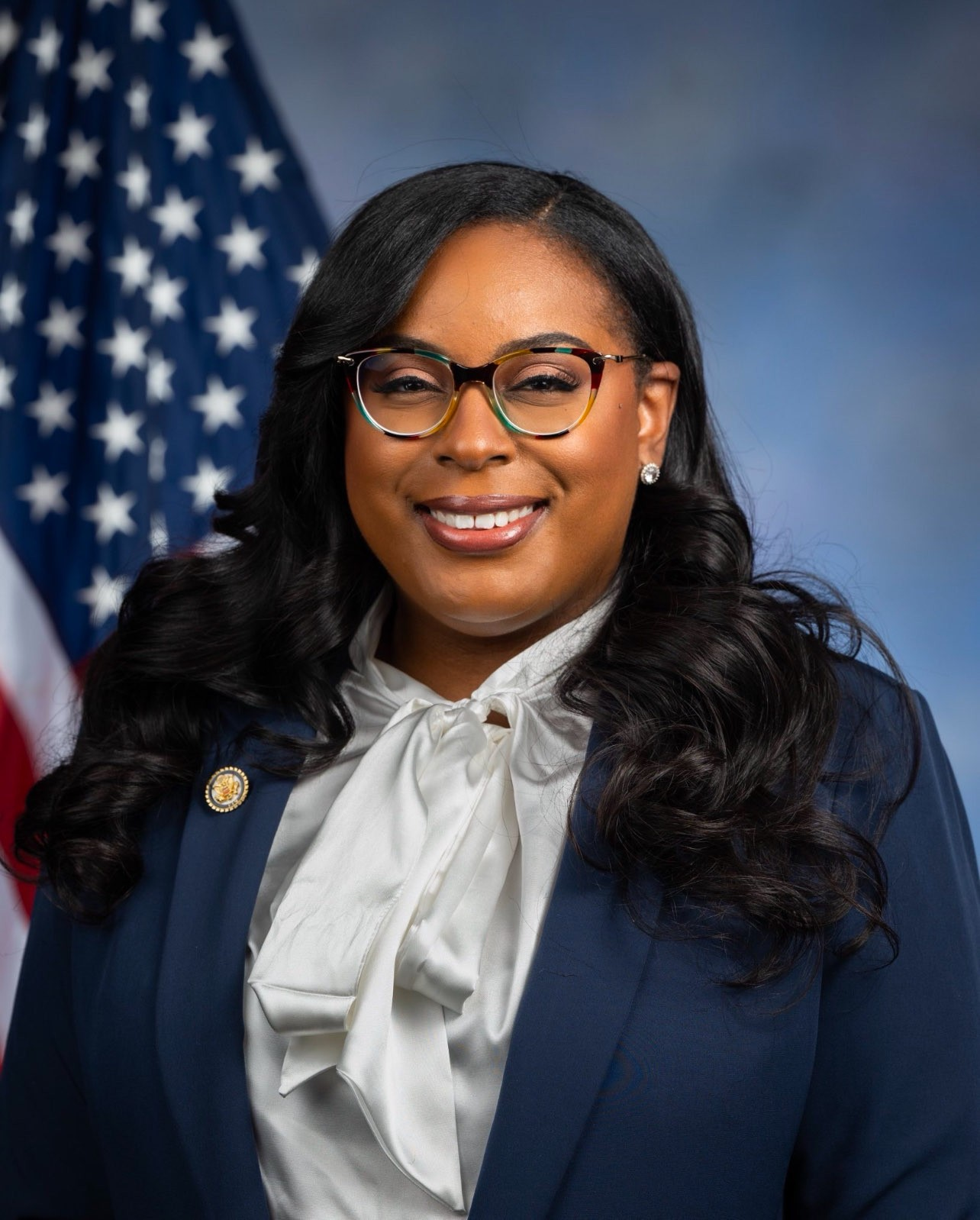
LaMonica McIver

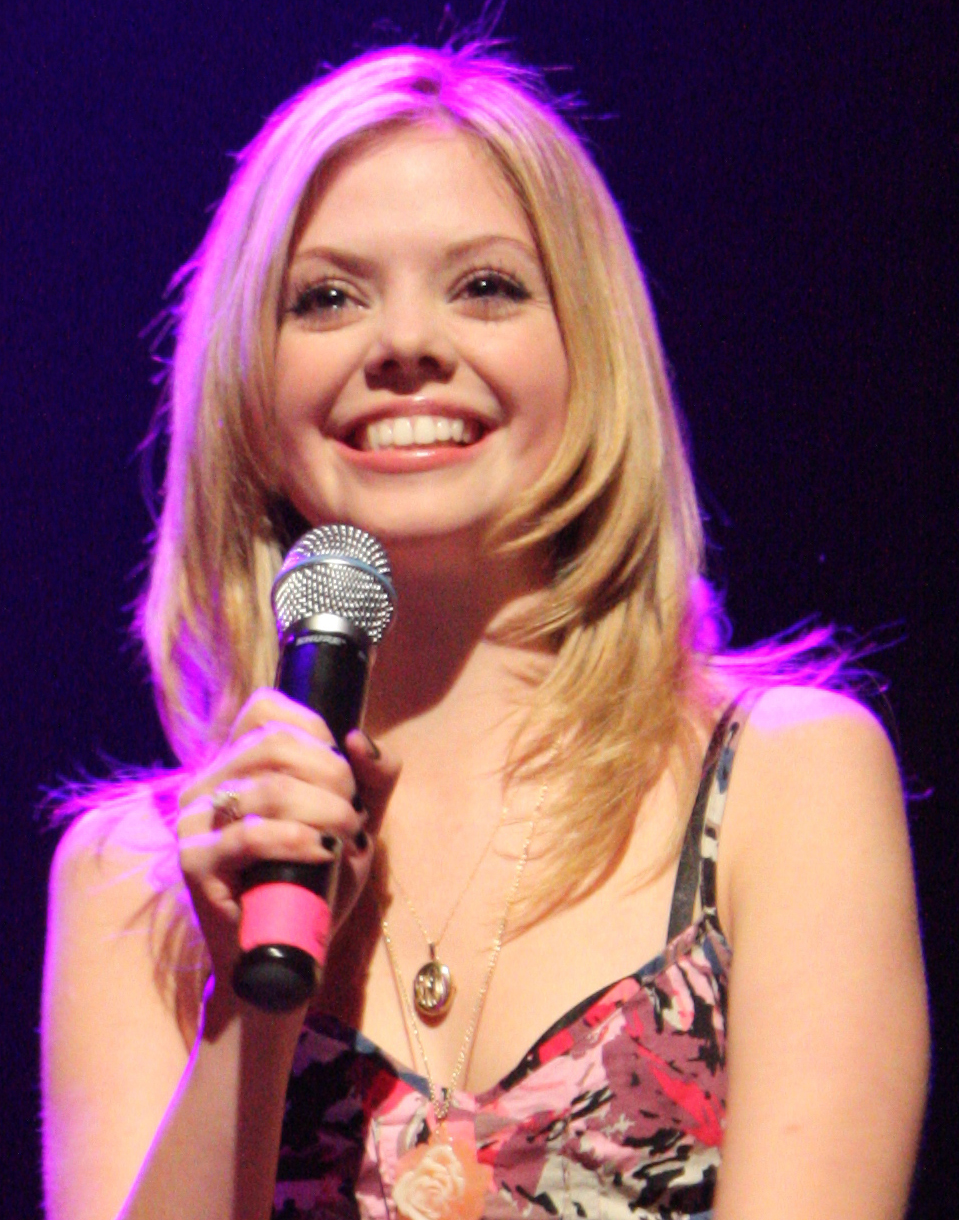
Dreama Walker

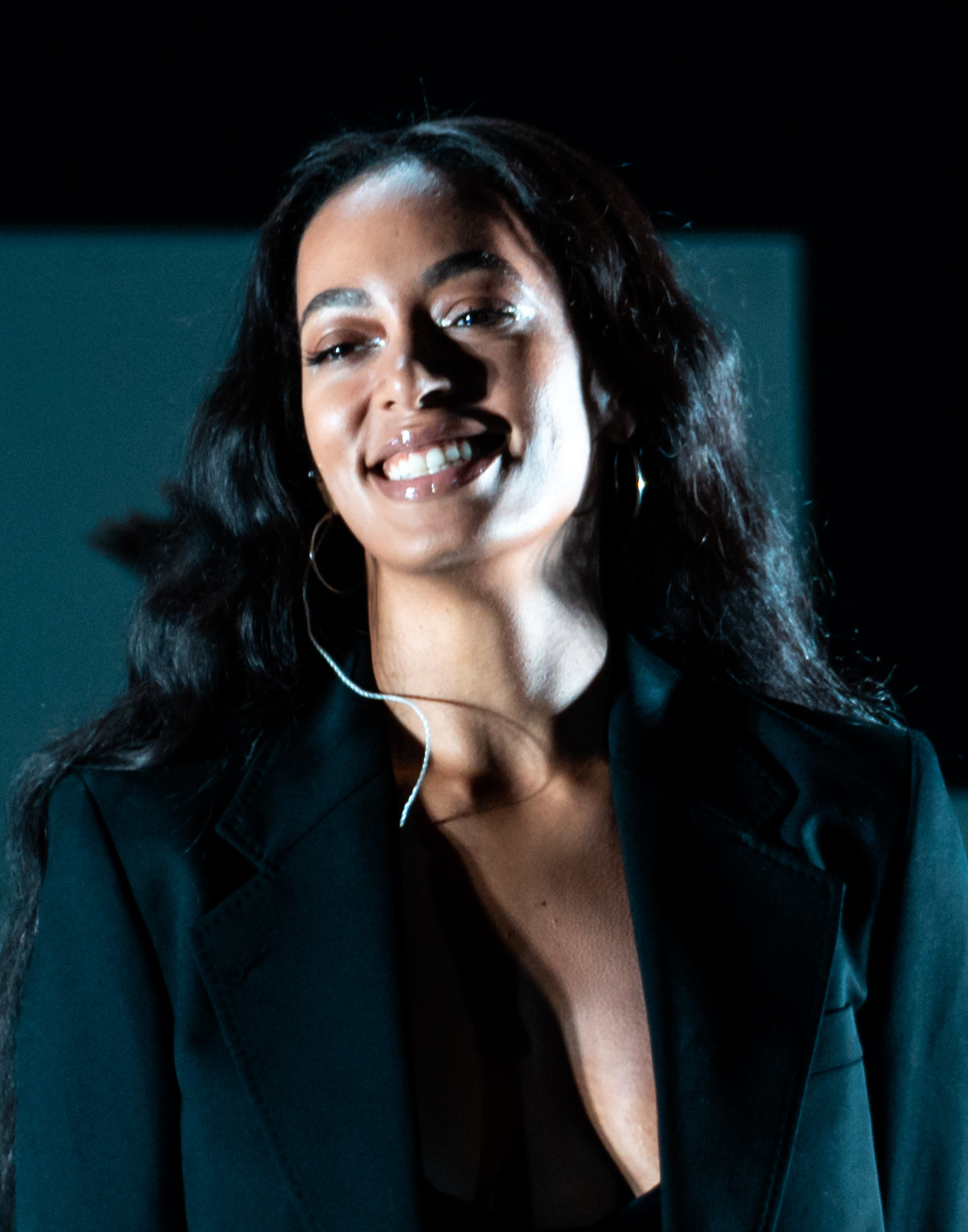
Solange Knowles

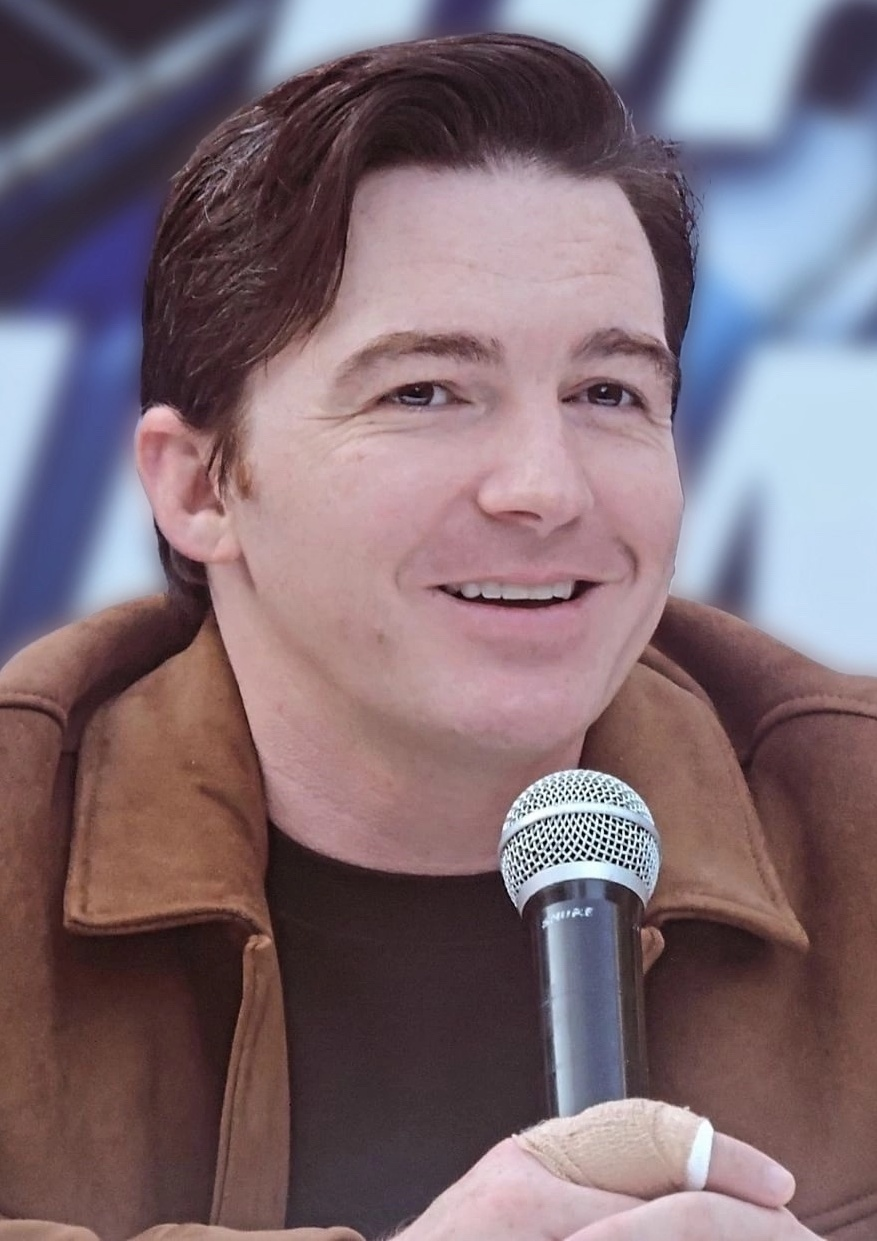
Drake Bell

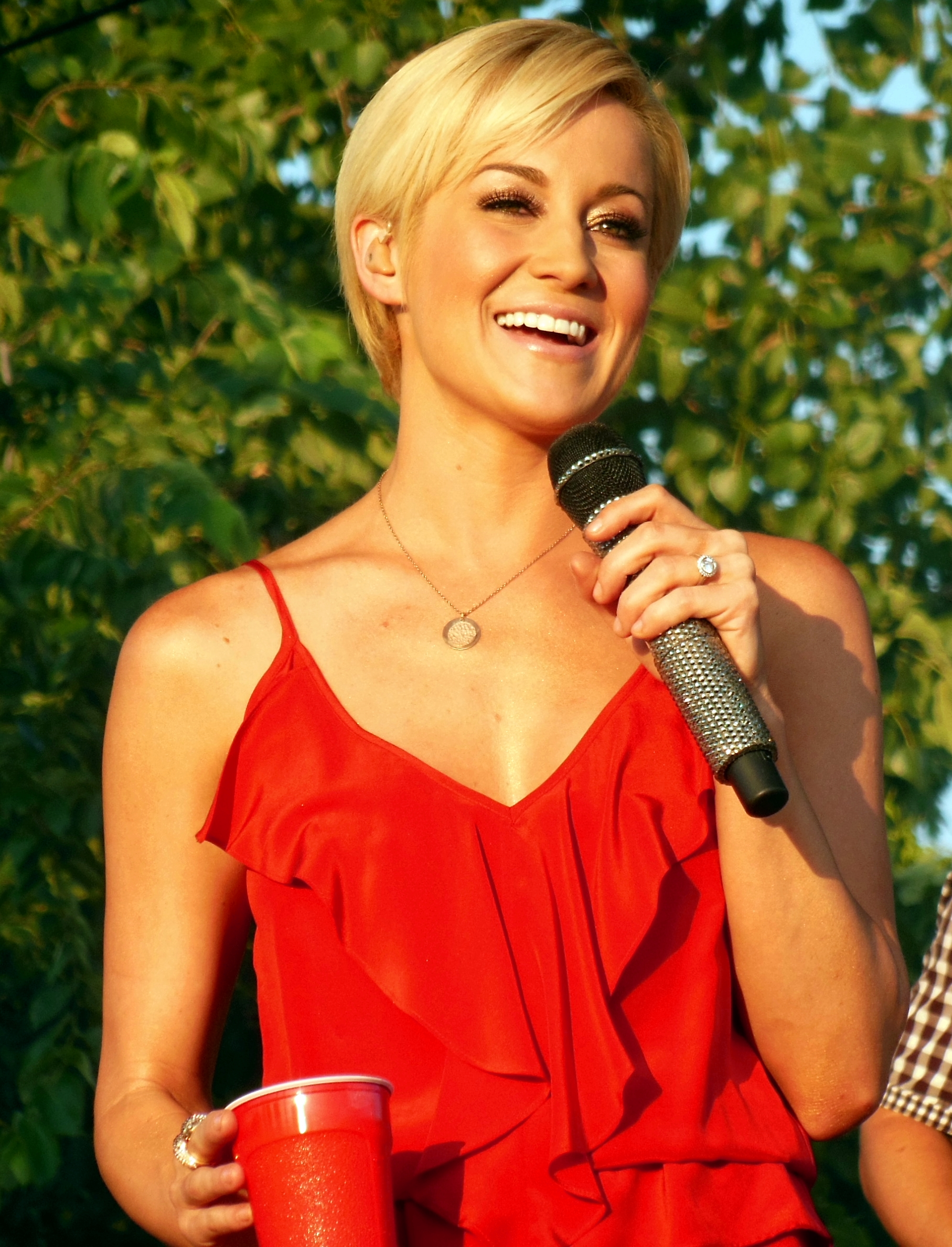
Kellie Pickler

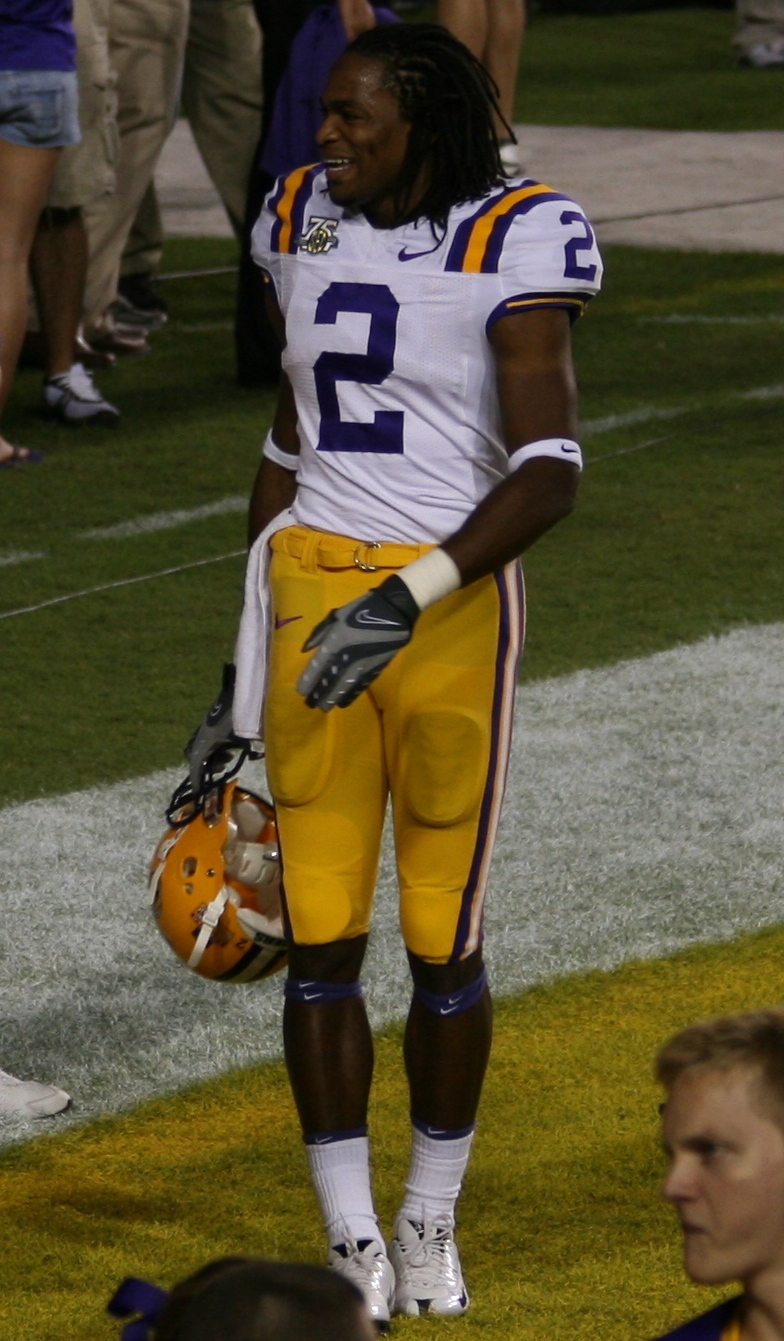
Demetrius Byrd

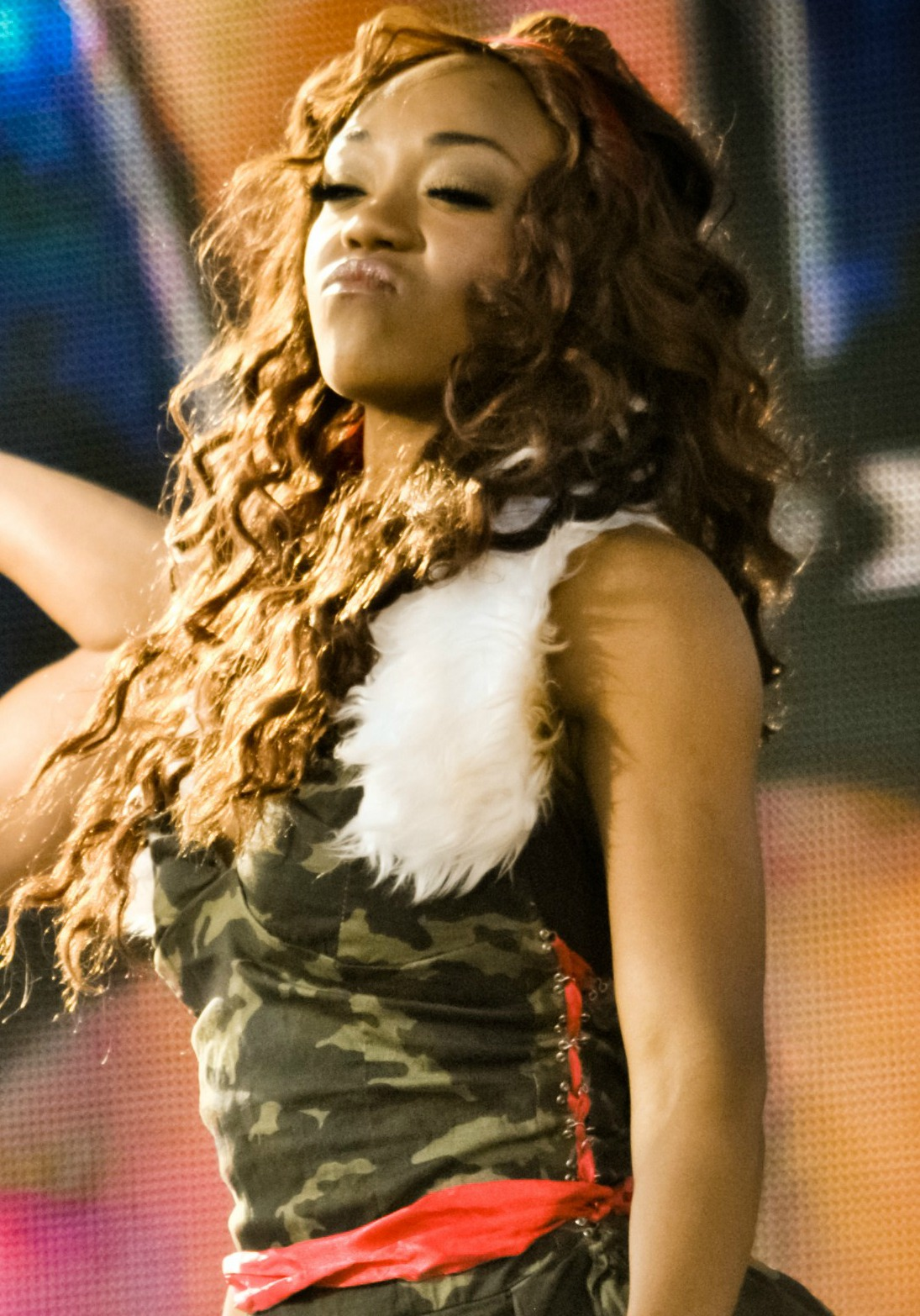
Alicia Fox

- June 1 – Danny Burgess, politician
- June 2
  - Tyler Bradt, kayaker
  - Curtis Lofton, football player
  - ZZ Ward, singer/songwriter
- June 3
  - Joseph Cheong, poker player
  - Robby Felix, football player
  - Brenden Jefferson, actor
  - Arthur Jones, football player (d. 2025)
  - Zach Lutz, baseball player
  - Josh Segarra, actor
- June 4 – Albert McClellan, football player
- June 5 – Vernon Gholston, football player
- June 6
  - Danesha Adams, soccer player
  - Justin Allgaier, race car driver
  - Collin Balester, baseball player
  - Henry Beck, politician
  - Leslie Carter, pop singer (d. 2012)
  - Rachelle Dekker, novelist
  - David Karp, web developer and entrepreneur, founder of Tumblr
- June 7
  - Adunni Ade, American-born Nigerian actress and model
  - Keegan Bradley, golfer
  - Todd Carter, football player
- June 9
  - Caroline Bruce, Olympic swimmer
  - Brooks Foster, football player
- June 10
  - Brian Connelly, hockey player
  - Joey Zimmerman, actor and musician
- June 11
  - Nate Bowie, basketball player and coach
  - Chase Clement, football player
  - Andrew Cray, LGBT rights activist (d. 2014)
  - Shia LaBeouf, actor
- June 12
  - Erik Ainge, football player
  - Ely Allen, soccer player
  - Alexis Crimes, volleyball player
  - Jessica Keenan Wynn, actress
- June 13
  - Denise Bidot, model
  - Kat Dennings, actress
  - Clyde Gates, football player
  - Mary-Kate and Ashley Olsen, twin actresses and fashion designers
- June 14
  - Chris Barnett, mixed martial artist
  - Kyle Evans Gay, politician
  - Haley Hudson, actress
  - Ray Rosas, wrestler
- June 15 – Trevor Plouffe, baseball player
- June 16 – Josh Sitton, football player
- June 17 – Joe Crawford, basketball player
- June 18
  - Natasha Allegri, animation creator, writer, and comic book artist
  - Steve Cishek, baseball player
  - Caleb Joseph, baseball player
  - Brandon Lang, football player
  - Crystal Renn, model and author
  - Claire Thomas, food enthusiast, blogger, and TV show host
  - Matt Walsh, right-wing commentator
- June 19
  - Jason Michael Brescia, writer and director
  - Erin Mackey, actress and singer
  - Marvin Williams, basketball player
- June 20
  - Jordan Blake, singer and frontman for A Skylit Drive (2005-2007, 2022-2023) (d. 2023)
  - DJ Boldin, football player
  - LaMonica McIver, politician
  - Allie Quigley, basketball player
  - Dreama Walker, actress
- June 21
  - Rockne Brubaker, pair skater
  - Charlie Cole, Olympic rower
  - Zachary Rhyner, USAF combat controller and Air Force Cross recipient
- June 22
  - Lashrecse Aird, politician
  - Dwayne Anderson, basketball player
  - Bob the Drag Queen, drag queen and TV personality
  - Marlon Favorite, football player
- June 23
  - Christy Altomare, actress and singer/songwriter
  - Michael Annett, stock car racing driver
  - Sonya Balmores, actress, model, surfer, and pageant winner
  - Marti Malloy, judoka
- June 24
  - Caroline Burckle, Olympic swimmer
  - Kelly Carrington, model and clothing designer
  - Jessamyn Duke, wrestler and mixed martial artist
  - Phil Hughes, baseball player
  - Solange Knowles, actress and singer
  - Shea Salinas, soccer player
  - Brandon Underwood, football player
- June 25
  - Sean Barnette, basketball player
  - Charlie Davies, soccer player
  - Bradley Fletcher, football player
  - Gabriele Grunewald, track-and-field athlete (d. 2019)
  - Monogem, singer
- June 26
  - Brittney Karbowski, voice actress
  - Angelina Pivarnick, television personality, model, and singer
- June 27
  - Drake Bell, actor, singer/songwriter and multi-instrumentalist
  - Bryan Fletcher, Nordic combined skier
  - LaShawn Merritt, Olympic sprinter
  - Kristal Uzelac, artistic gymnast
- June 28
  - Scooter Berry, football player
  - Matteo Lane, comedian, opera singer, and oil painter
  - Kellie Pickler, singer
  - Z Berg, singer
- June 29
  - Perry Baker, rugby player
  - Casey J, Gospel singer
  - Serena Deeb, wrestler
  - Disasterpeace, musician and composer
- June 30
  - Demetrius Byrd, football player
  - Mike Carp, baseball player
  - Alicia Fox, wrestler and model
  - Kevin Jurovich, football player

=== July ===
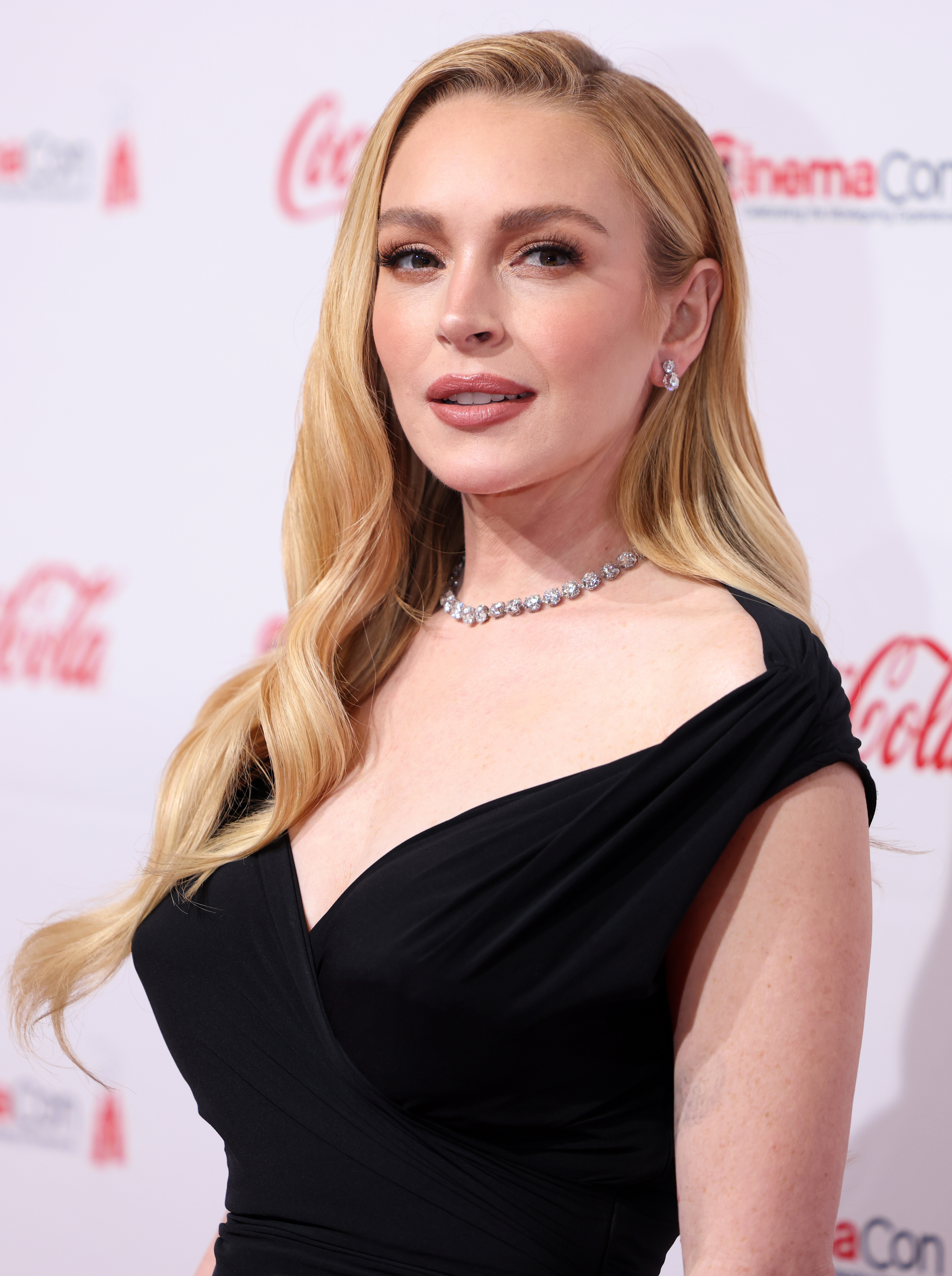
Lindsay Lohan

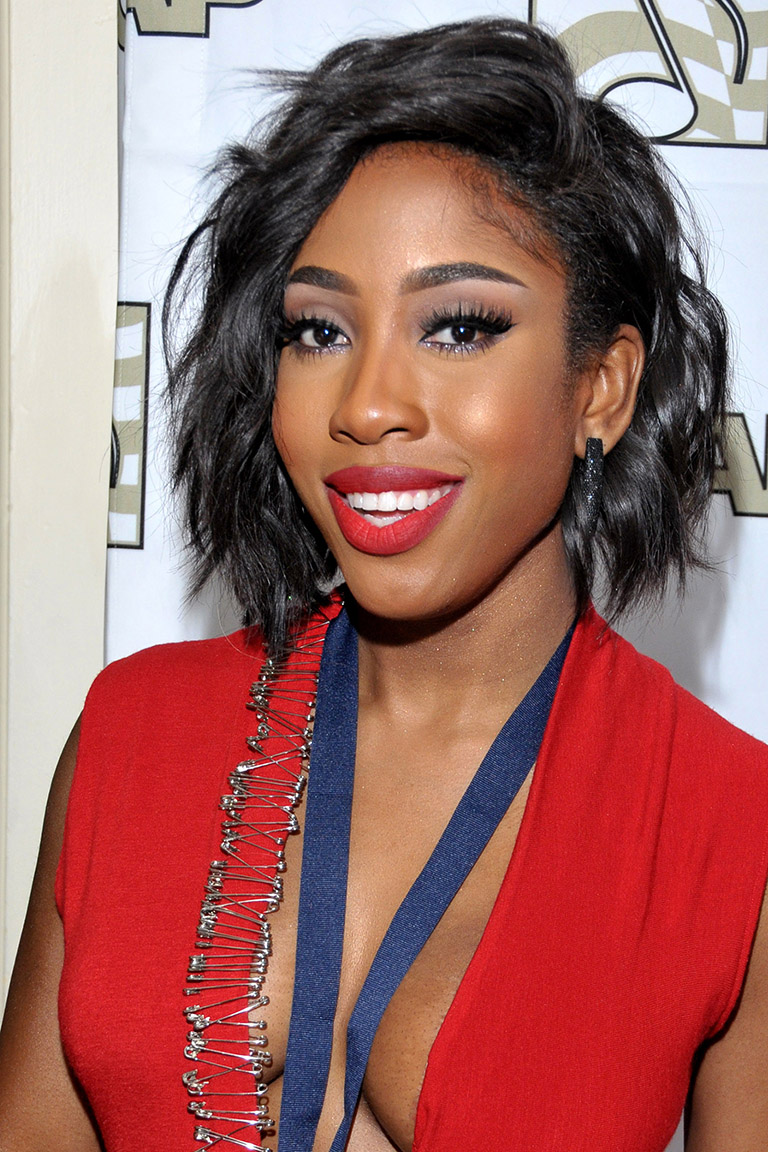
Sevyn Streeter

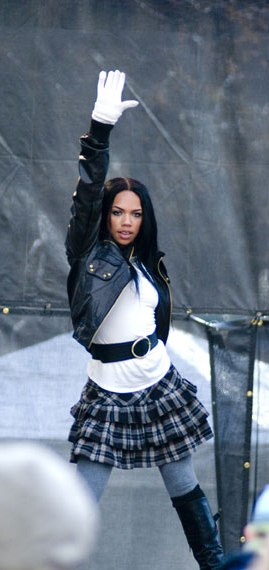
Kiely Williams

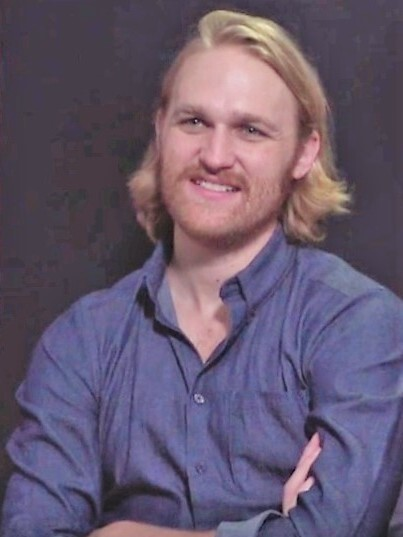
Wyatt Russell

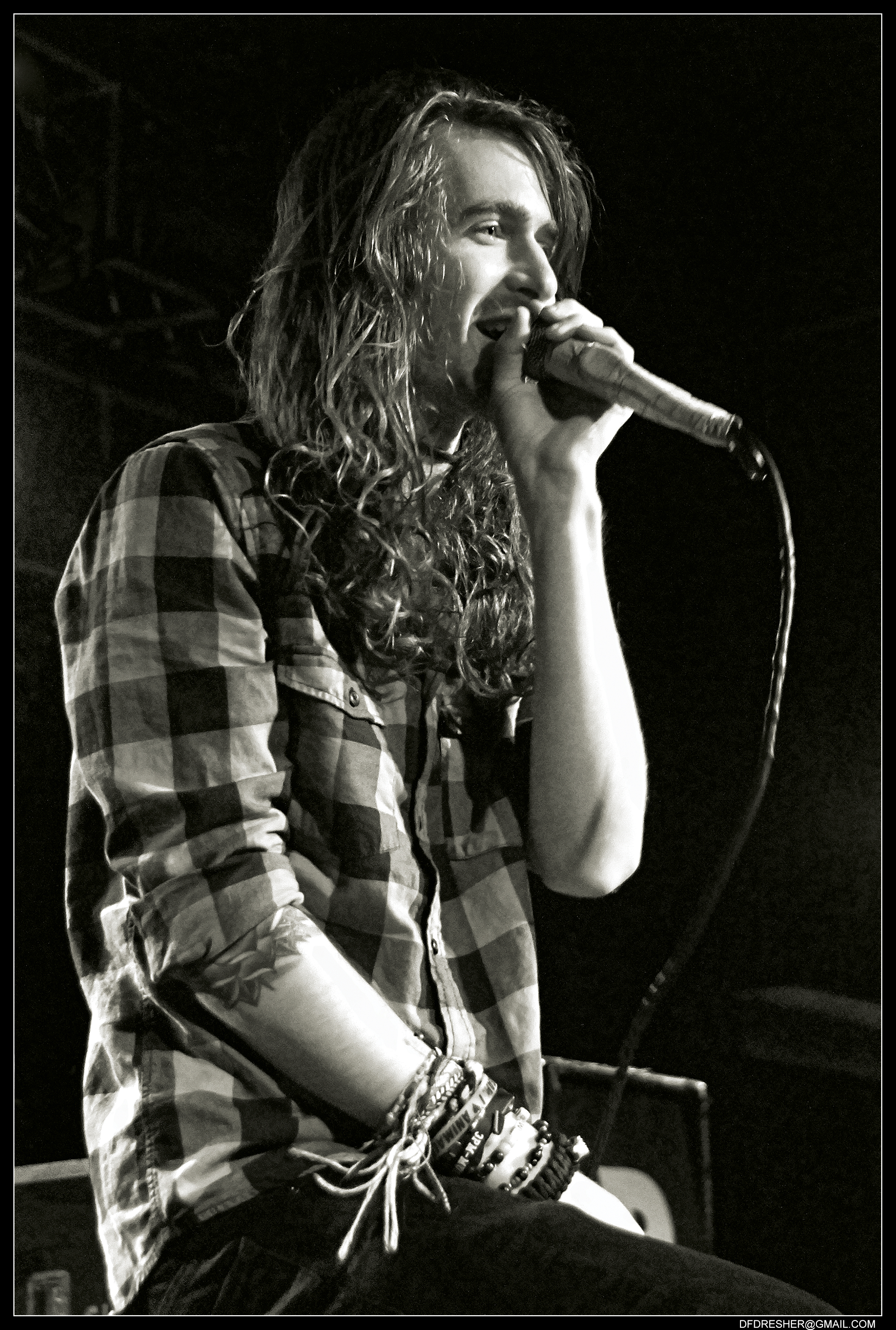
Derek Sanders

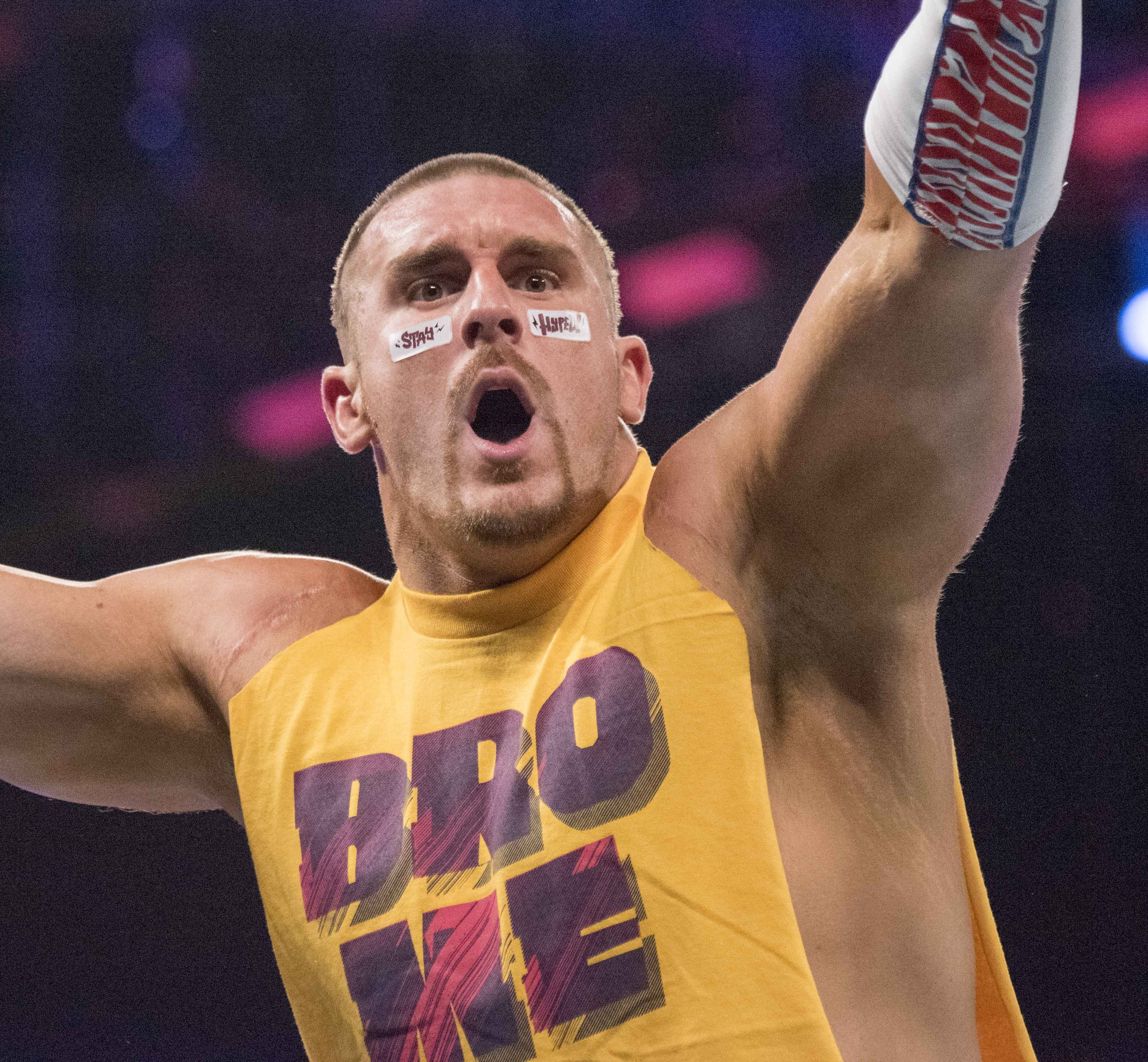
Mojo Rawley

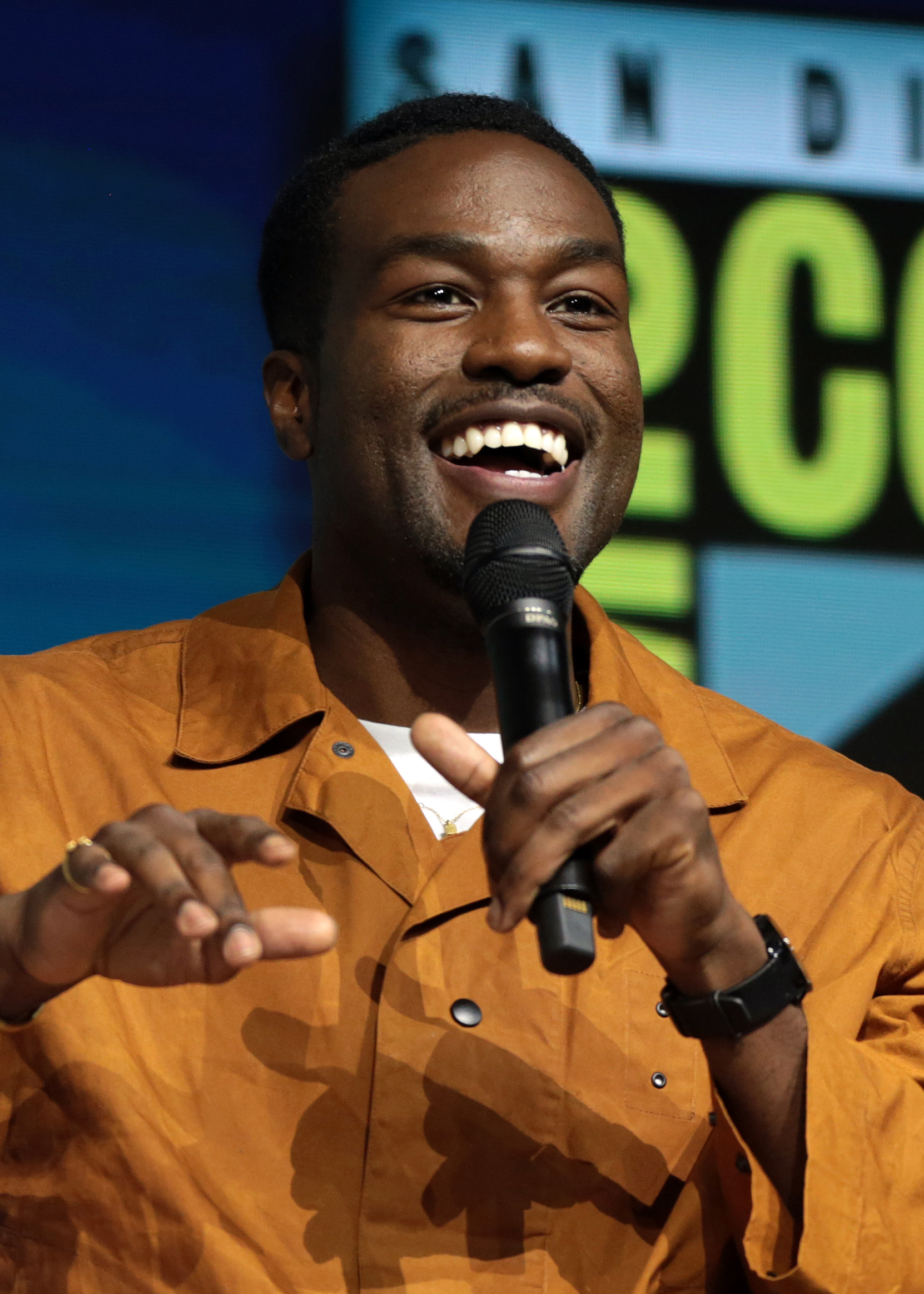
Yahya Abdul-Mateen II

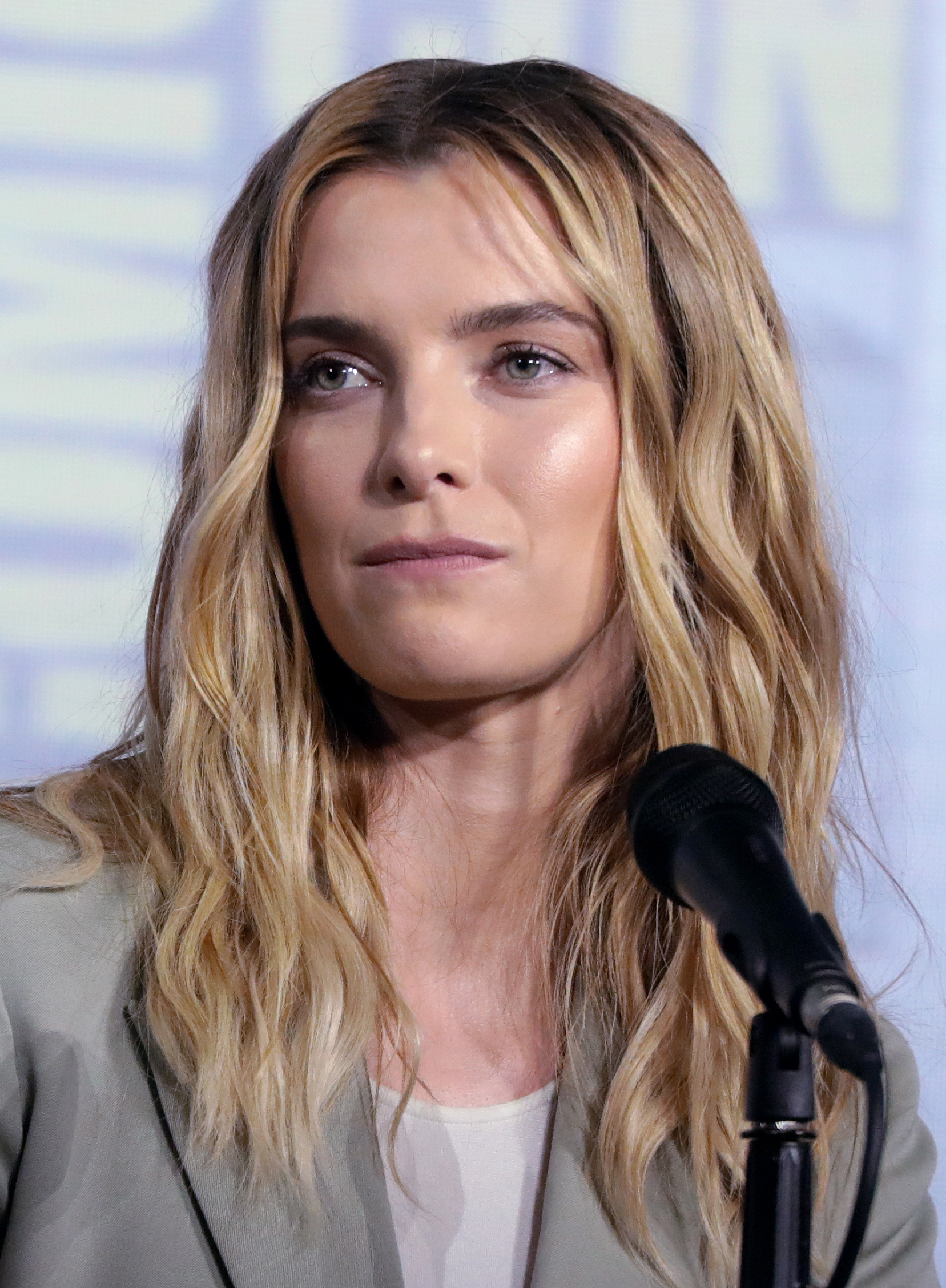
Betty Gilpin

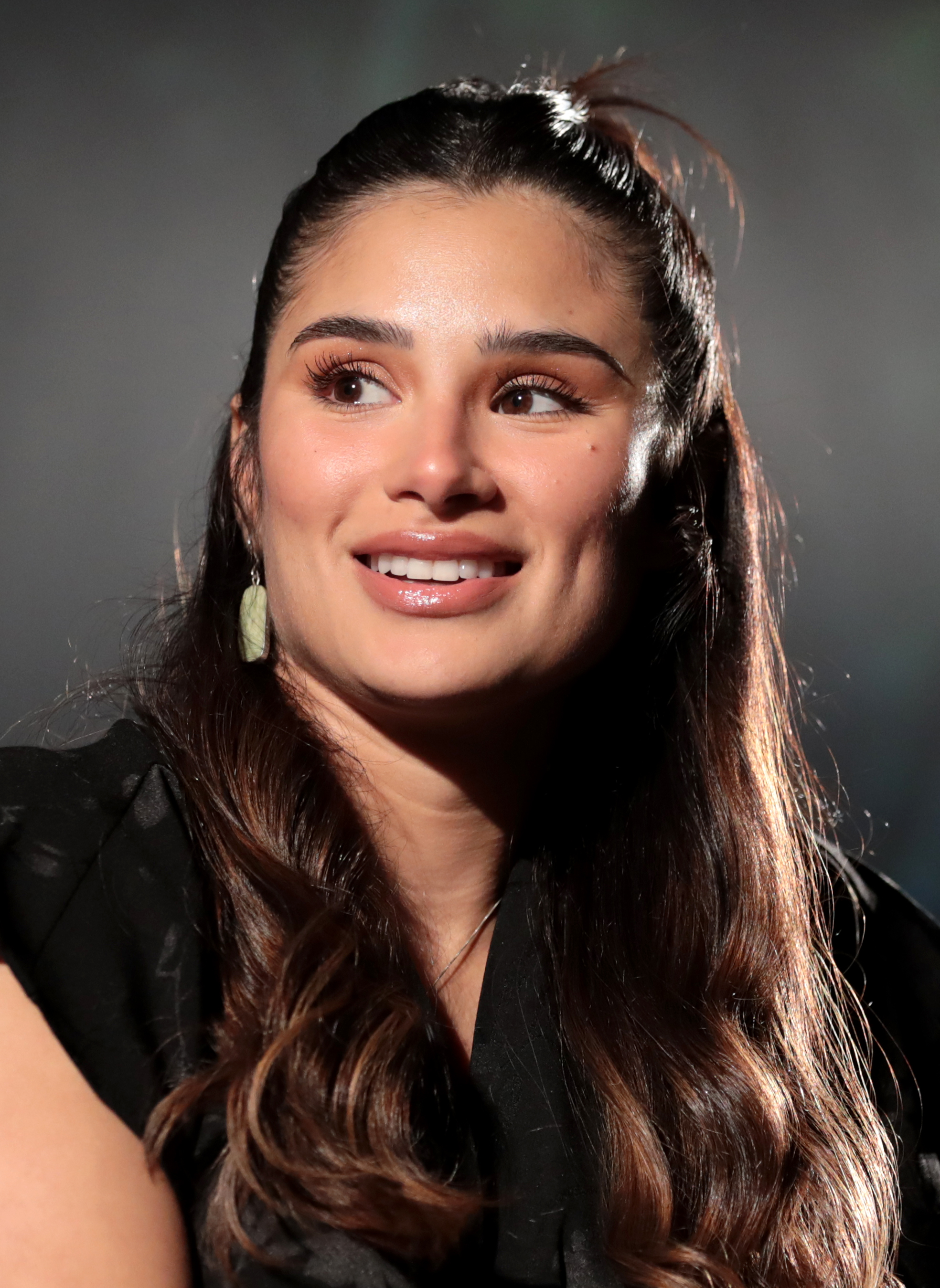
Diane Guerrero

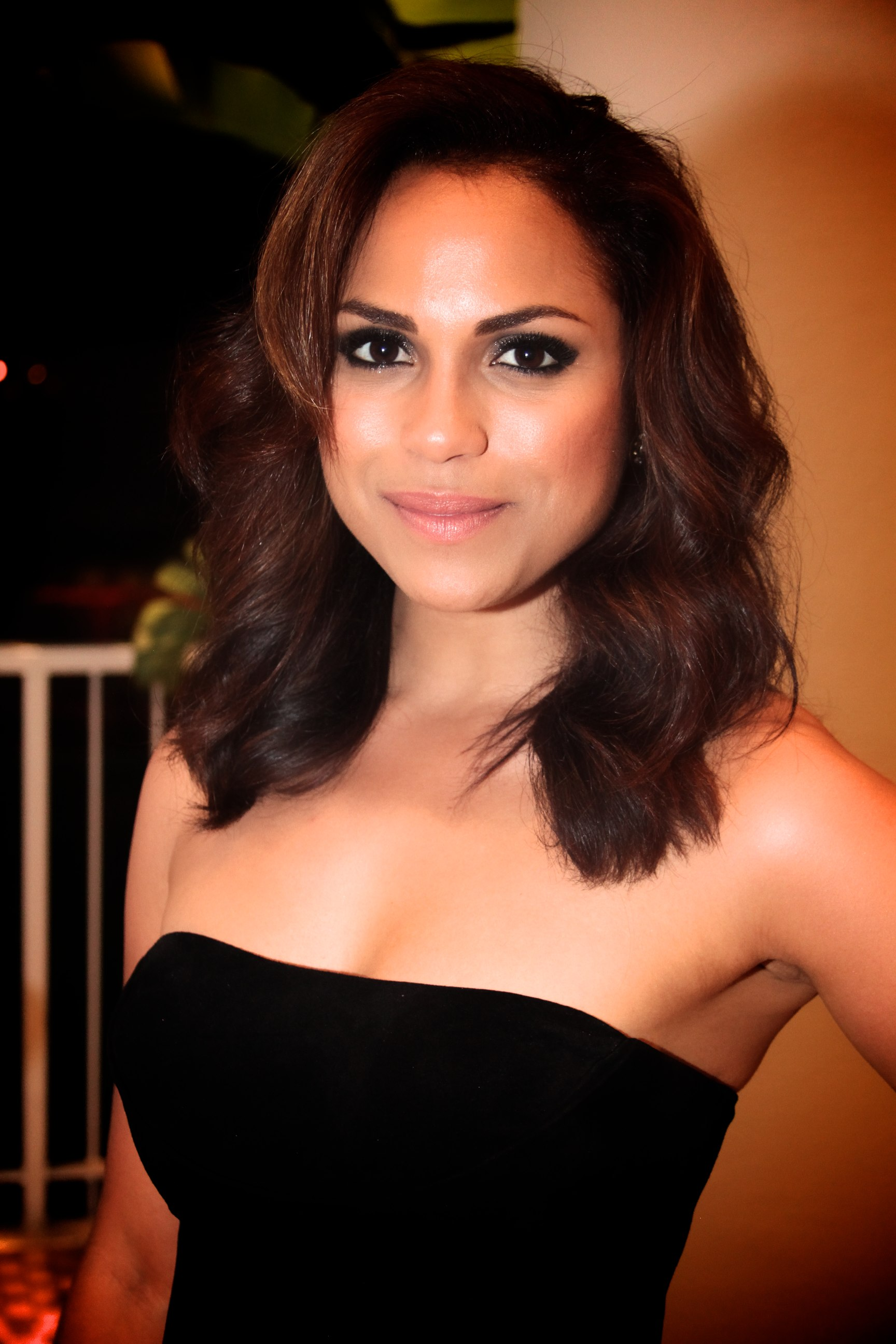
Monica Raymund

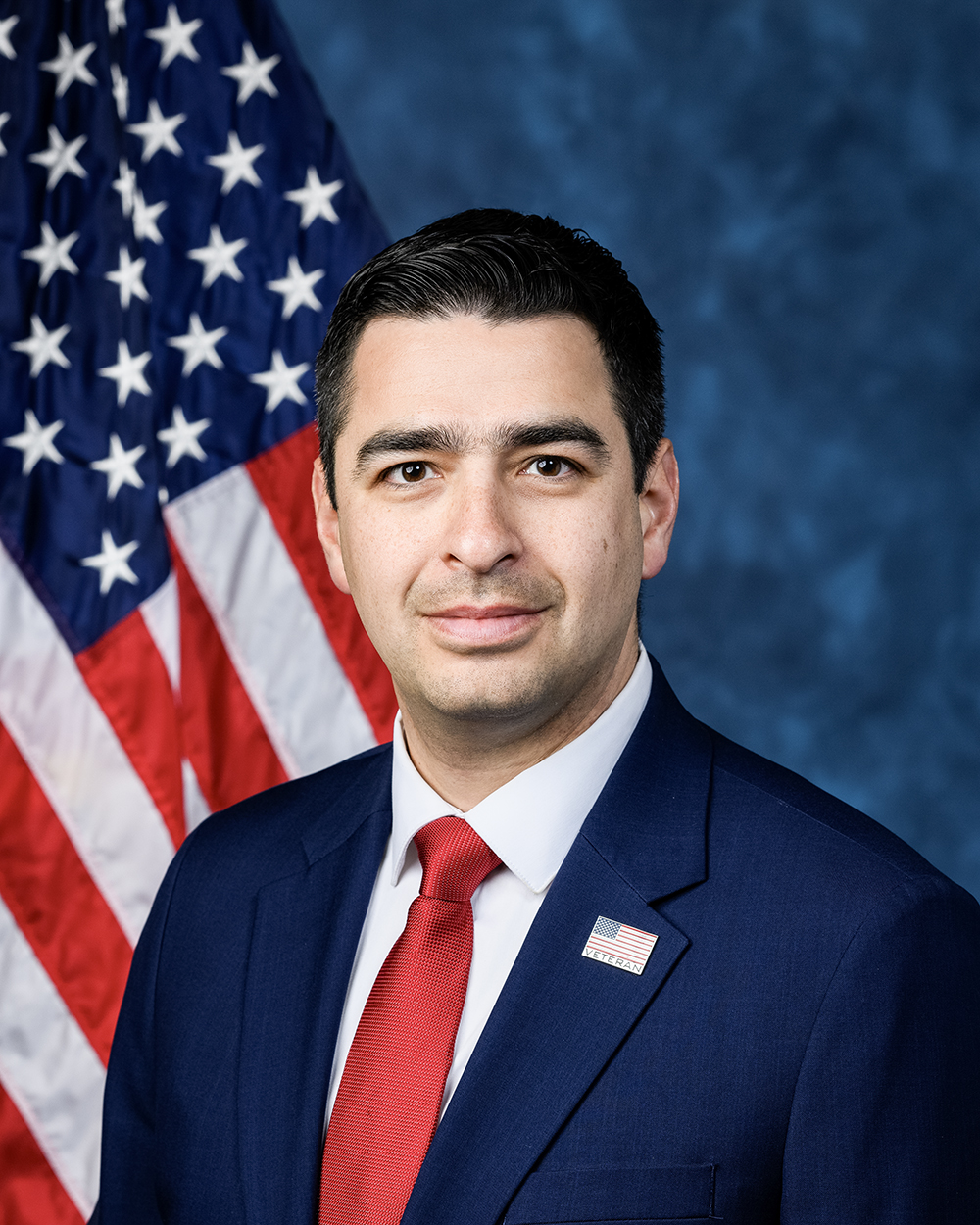
Gabe Evans

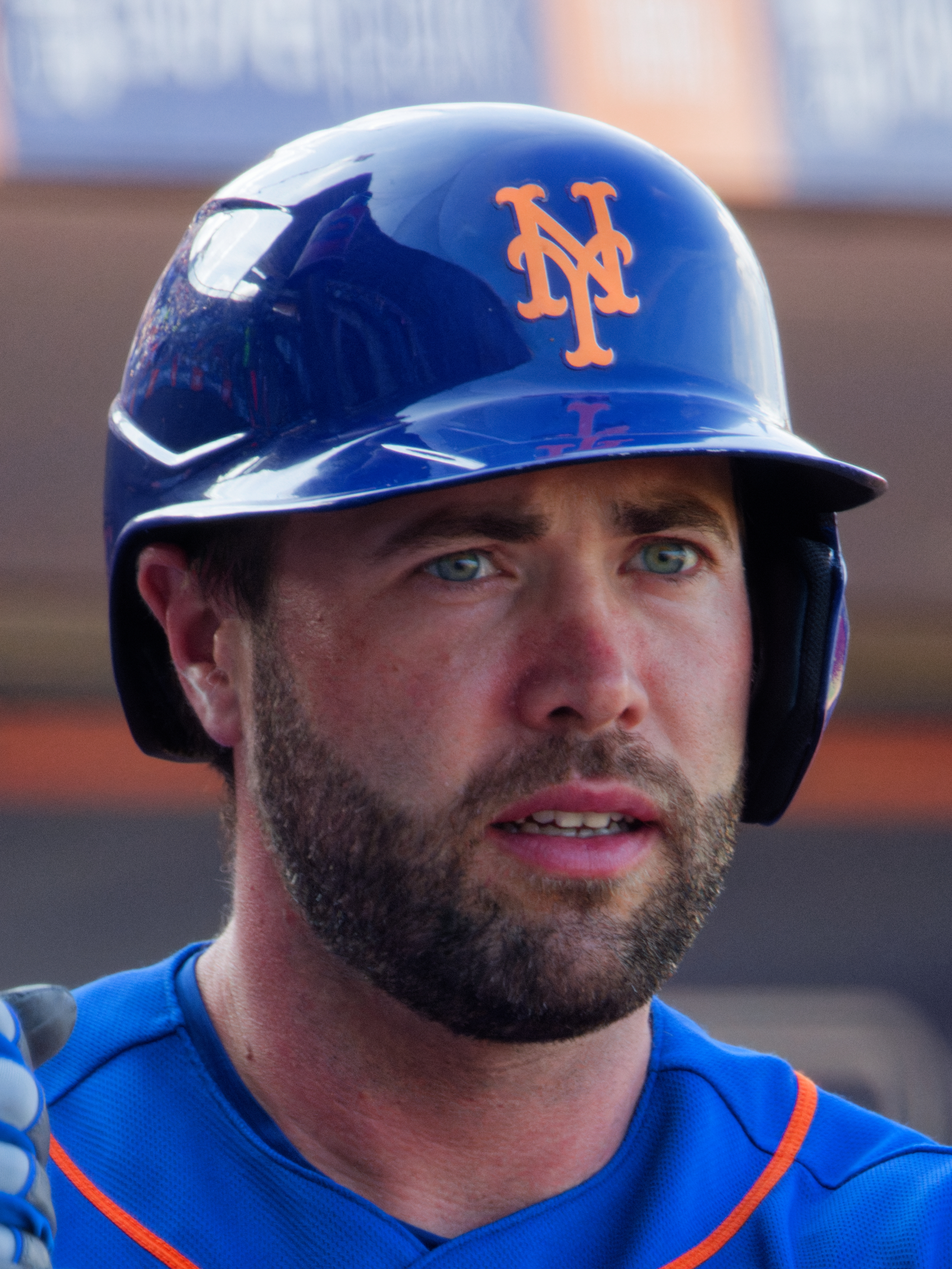
Darin Ruf

- July 1
  - Garrett Adelstein, poker player
  - Charlie Blackmon, baseball player
  - Rachel Summerlyn, wrestler
- July 2
  - Brett Cecil, baseball player
  - Kendrick Farris, Olympic weightlifter
  - Lindsay Lohan, actress, pop singer, and model
- July 3
  - Jerome Felton, football player
  - Caleb Sean, musician
  - Nick Schaus, hockey player
- July 4
  - Justin Anderson, football player
  - Shane Barnett, politician
  - Jaclyn Betham, actress and ballerina
  - Sebastián Botero, American-born Colombian soccer player
- July 5
  - Tal and Oren Alexander, real estate moguls
  - Kayden Coleman, transgender advocate, educator, and social media influencer
  - Joelle Forte, figure skater
- July 6
  - Leon Frierson, actor and comedian
  - Derrick Williams, football player
- July 7
  - Lauren Andino, artist, skateboarder, musician, and co-founder of DL Skateboards
  - Raphael Cox, soccer player
  - Ana Kasparian, political commentator
  - Jerome Singleton, Paralympic track-and-field athlete
  - Sevyn Streeter, singer
- July 8
  - Leon Abravanel, soccer coach
  - Kevin Chappell, golfer
  - Brittany Force, drag racer
  - Jake McDorman, actor
- July 9
  - Antoine Cason, football player
  - Dominic Cervi, soccer player
  - Simon Dumont, freestyle skier
  - Katie Stam, Miss America 2009
  - Brandon Uranowitz, actor
  - Kiely Williams, actress and singer, member of 3LW
- July 10 – Wyatt Russell, actor
- July 11
  - Bryan Augenstein, baseball player
  - Will Brill, actor
  - Derek Sanders, singer and frontman for Mayday Parade
  - Geoff Schwartz, football player
- July 12 – Etchu Tabe, Cameroonian-born soccer player
- July 13
  - dakotaz, YouTuber and Twitch streamer
  - Denise Bidot, model
- July 14 – Elbert Mack, football player
- July 15
  - Yahya Abdul-Mateen II, actor
  - Stephanie Andujar, actress, director, producer, writer, dancer, and singer/songwriter
  - Ari Aster, director, screenwriter, and producer
  - David Clark, politician
  - Brandon Sumrall, football player
- July 16 – Julia Bullock, opera singer
- July 17
  - Jason Aalon Butler, singer and political activist
  - Brando Eaton, actor
  - Mojo Rawley, wrestler and football player
  - Lacey Von Erich, wrestler
- July 18
  - Angel Deradoorian, musician
  - Eugene Cordero, actor
- July 19
  - Atossa Araxia Abrahamian, journalist
  - Jarell Christian, basketball player and coach
  - Dennis Lee, singer and co-frontman for Alesana
  - Dustin Ybarra, actor and comedian
- July 21
  - Jex Blackmore, activist and performance artist
  - Jonni Cheatwood, visual artist
  - Michael Doneger, film director, screenwriter, and actor
  - Betty Gilpin, actress
  - Diane Guerrero, actress
- July 22
  - Jolene Anderson, basketball player
  - Colette Appel, pair skater
  - Shawn Chrystopher, rapper and music producer
  - Coleman Collins, basketball player
  - Chad Costello, ice hockey player
  - Sean Lee, football player
  - Kellyn Taylor, long-distance runner
- July 23
  - Andrew Carignan, baseball player
  - Kenwin Cummings, football player
- July 24
  - Richie Brockel, football player
  - Justin Berry, victim of child sexual abuse
- July 26
  - Travis Brown, football player
  - Monica Raymund, actress
- July 27
  - Hala Alyan, writer, poet, and clinical psychologist
  - Felecia Angelle, voice actress and ADR director
  - DeMarre Carroll, basketball player
  - Jessica Eye, mixed martial artist
  - Ryan Flaherty, baseball player
  - Maebe A. Girl, drag queen and politician
- July 28
  - Alex Bleeker, guitarist for Real Estate
  - Essence Carson, basketball player
  - Alexandra Chando, actress
  - Gabe Evans, politician
  - Darin Ruf, baseball player
- July 30
  - Robert Brewster, football player
  - Mike Carp, baseball player
  - Tom Dwan, poker player
  - Danielle Keaton, actress
- July 31
  - Sean Eldridge, Canadian-born political activist
  - Frank Foster, politician
  - Markice Moore, actor and TV personality

=== August ===
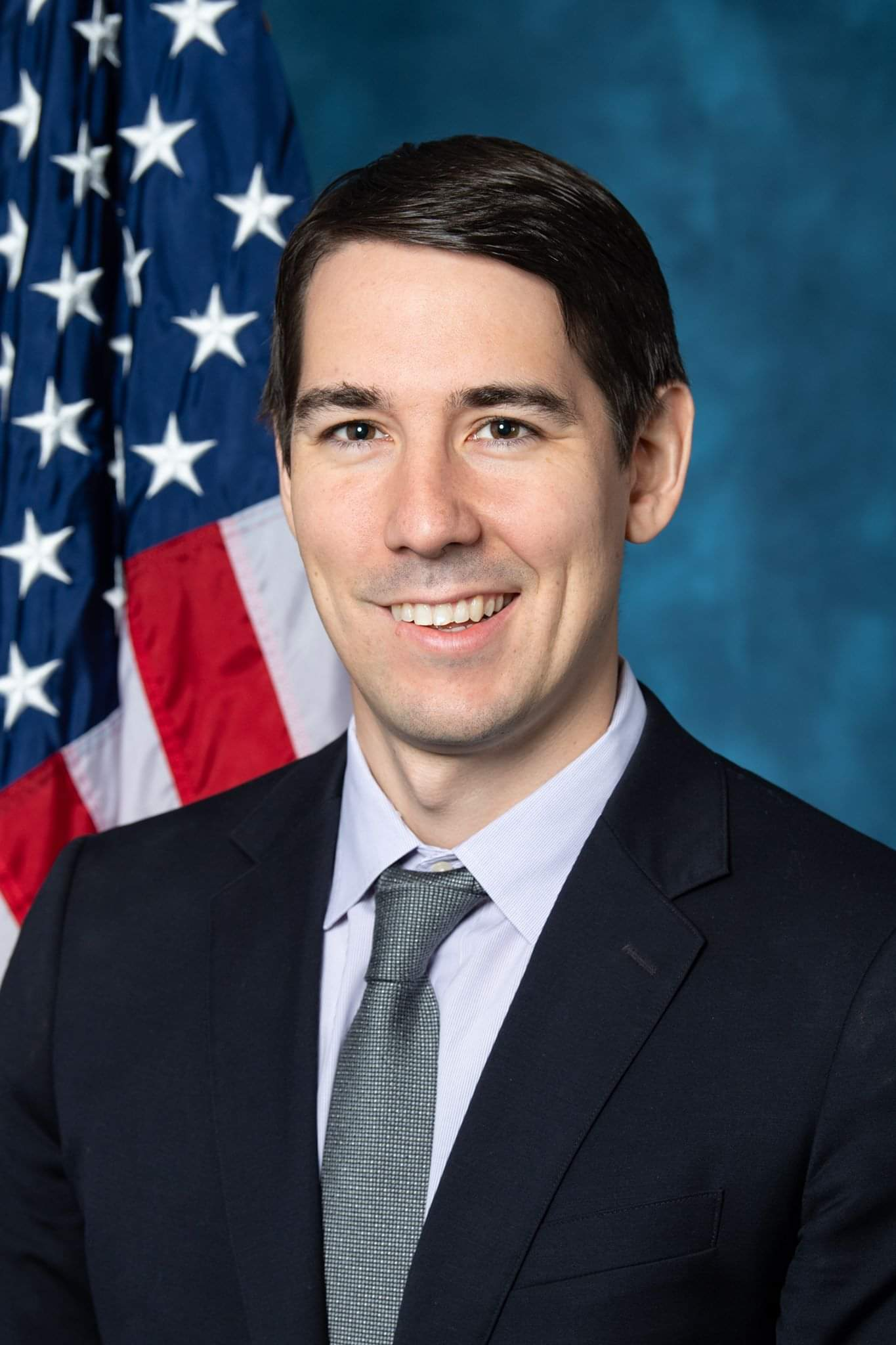
Josh Harder

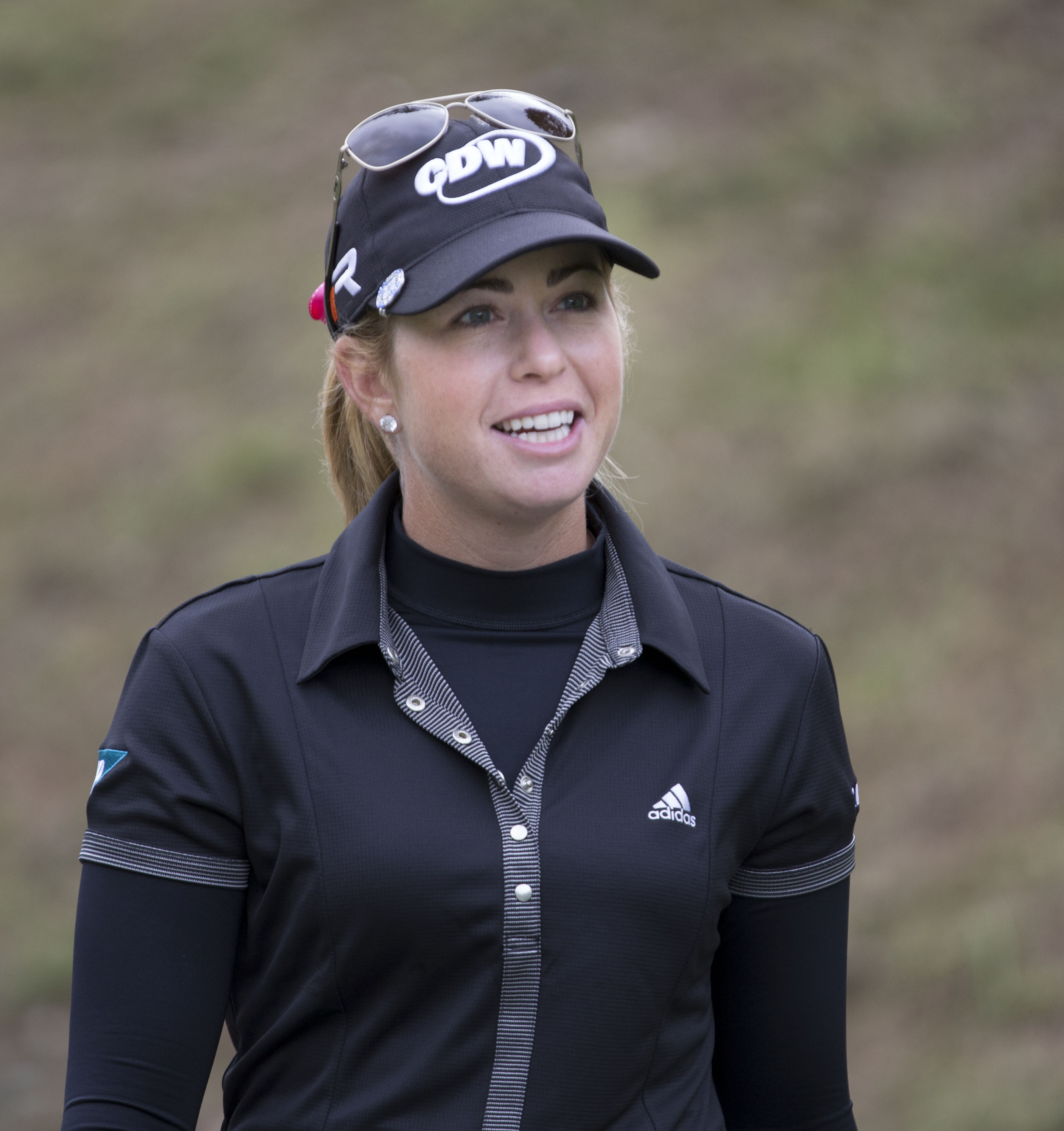
Paula Creamer

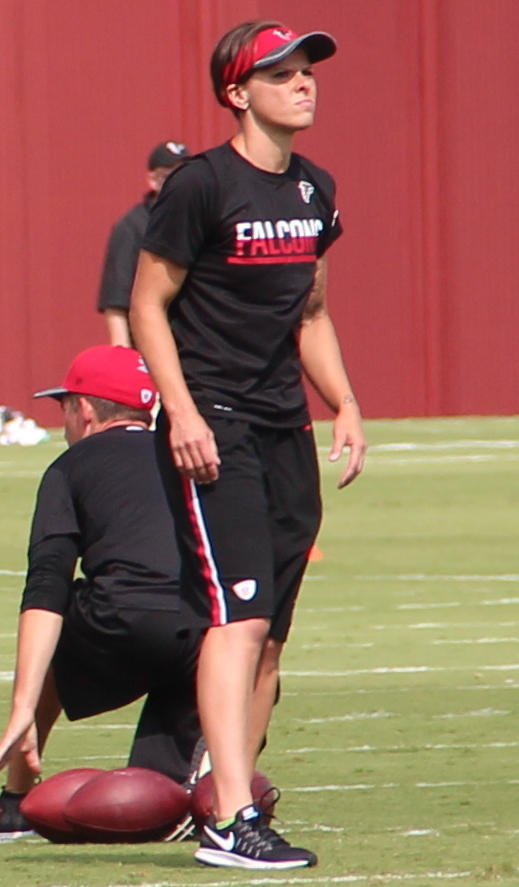
Katie Sowers

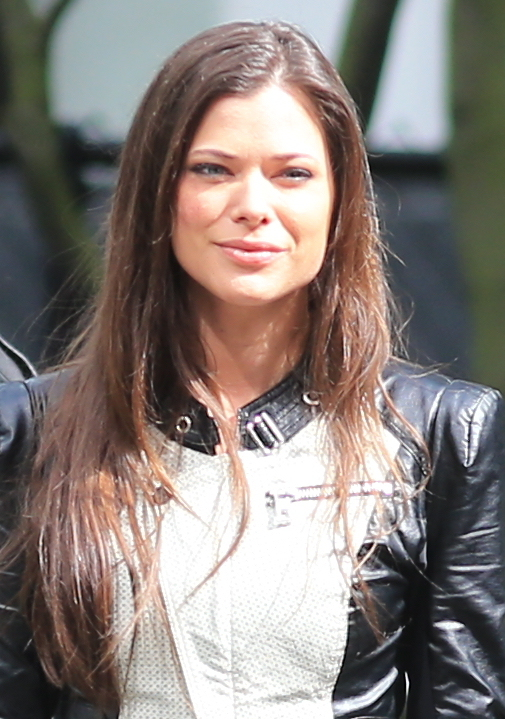
Peyton List

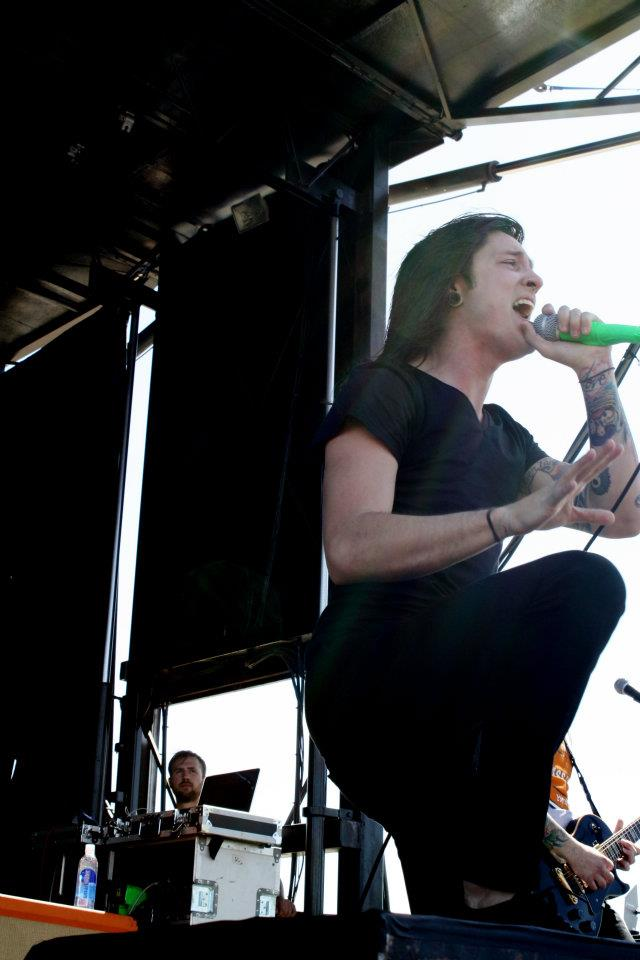
Telle Smith

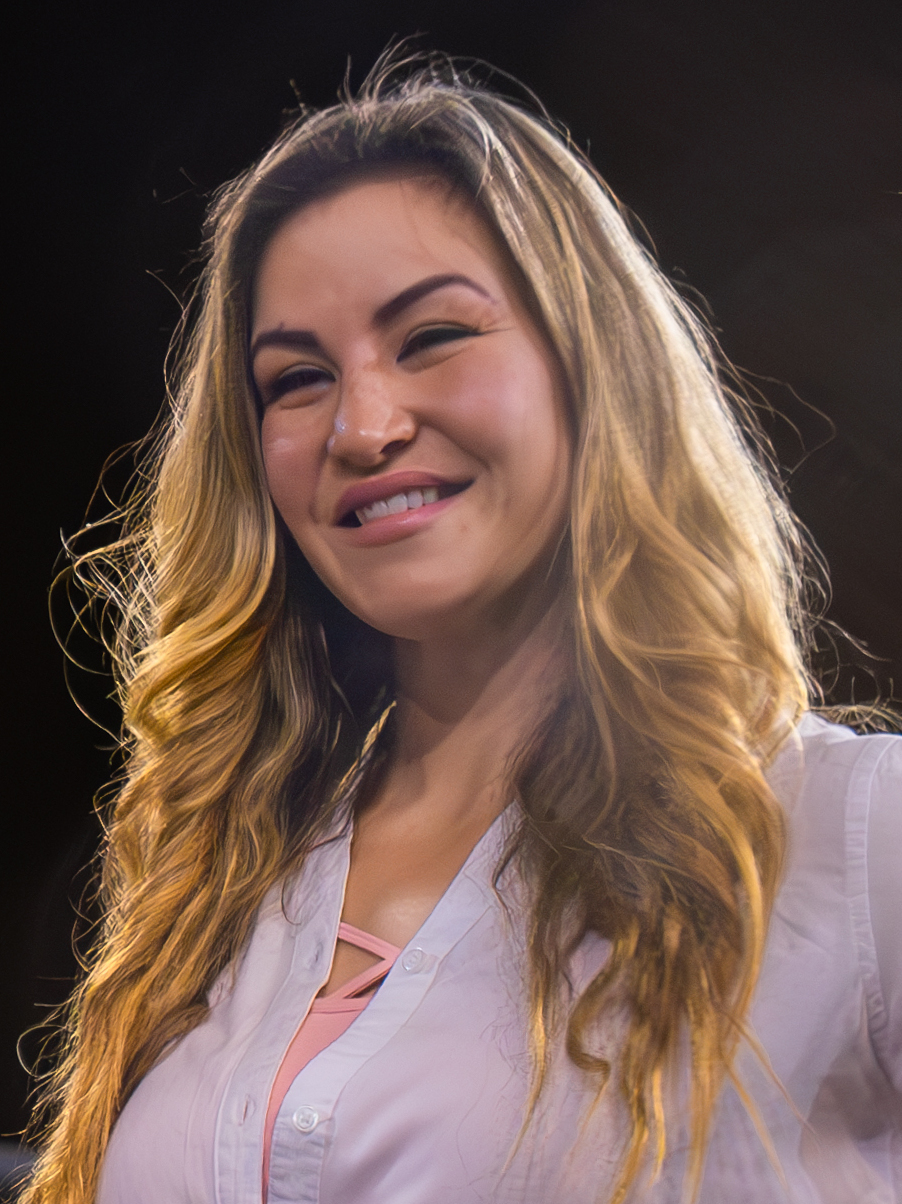
Miesha Tate

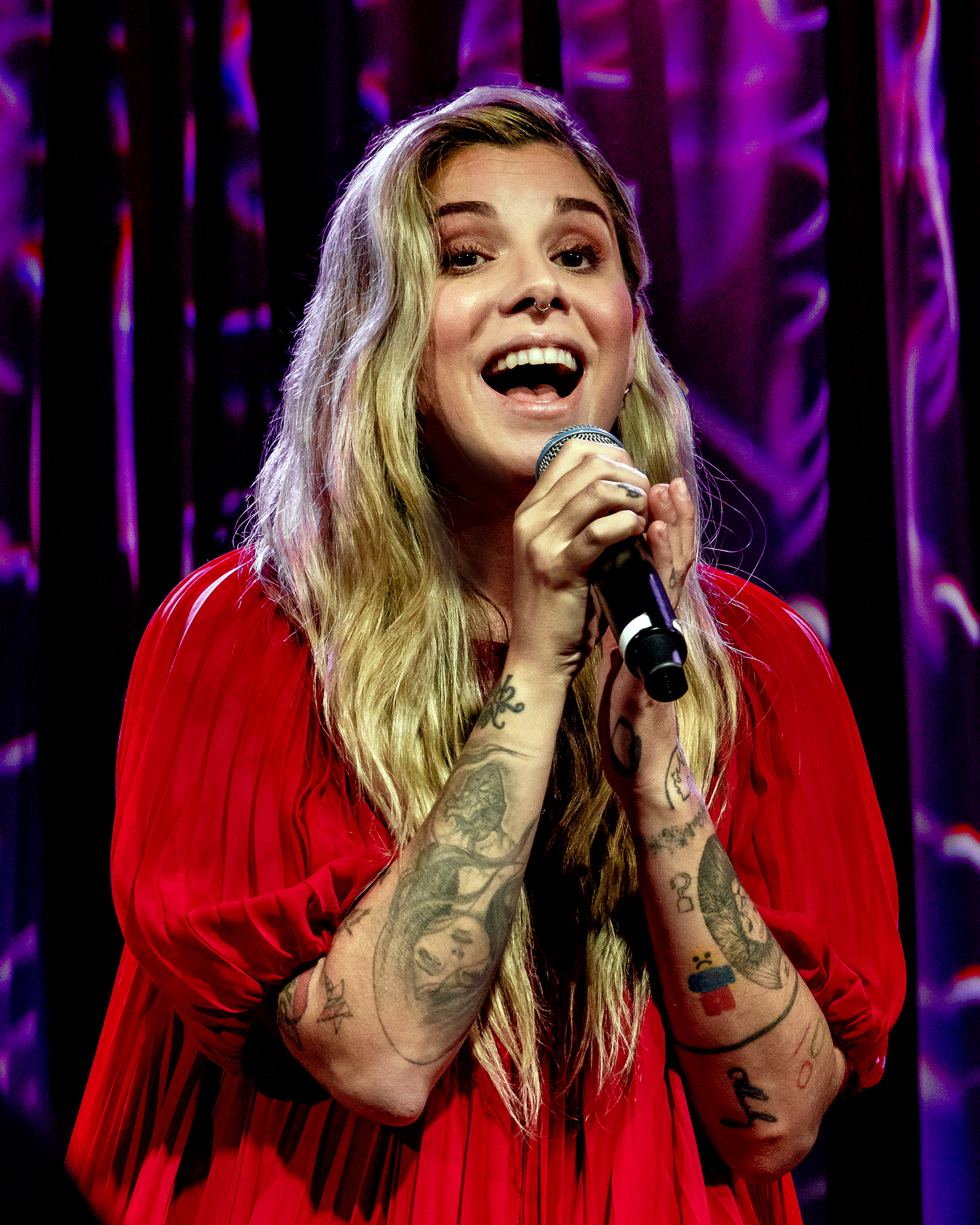
Christina Perri

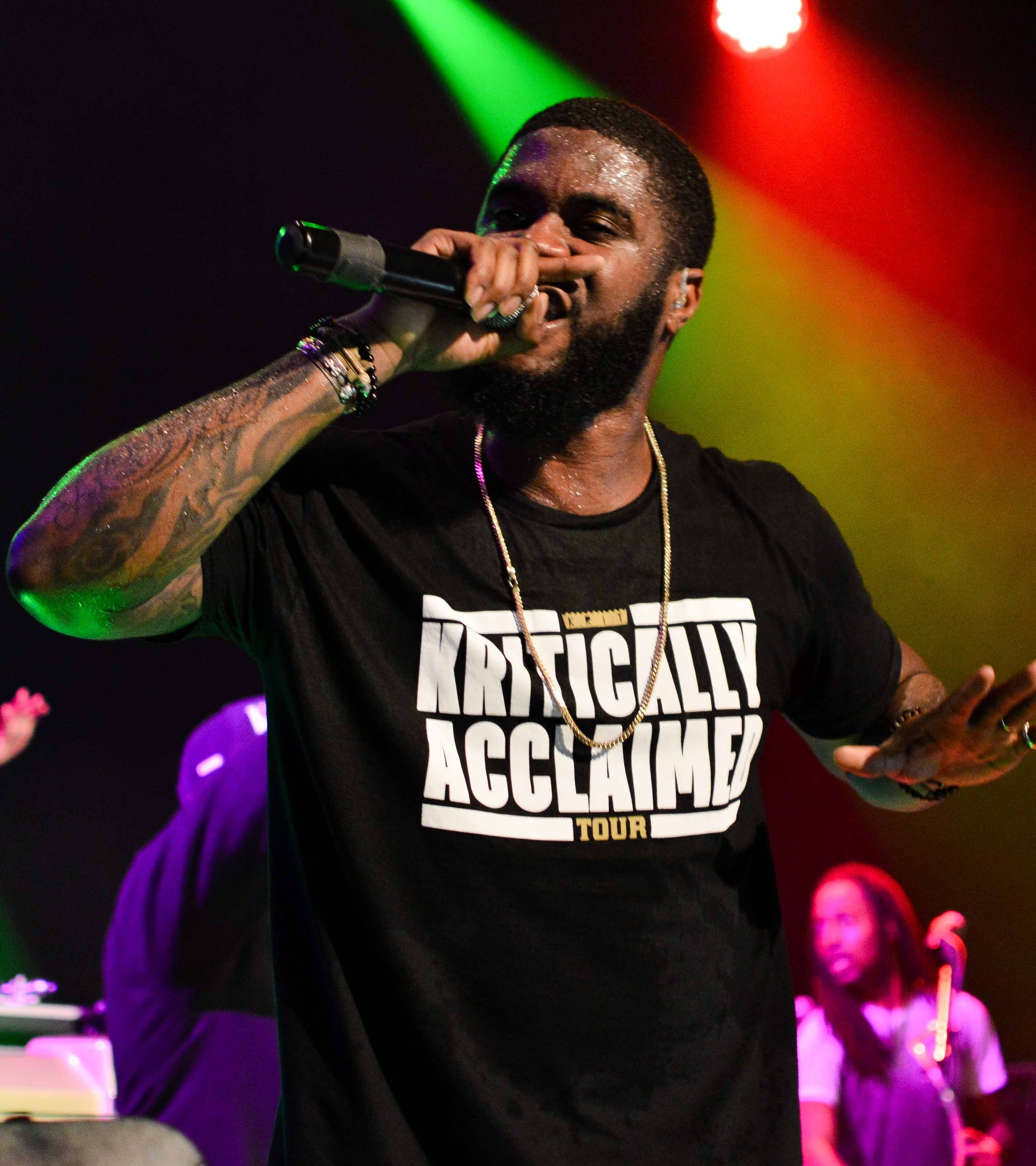
Big K.R.I.T.

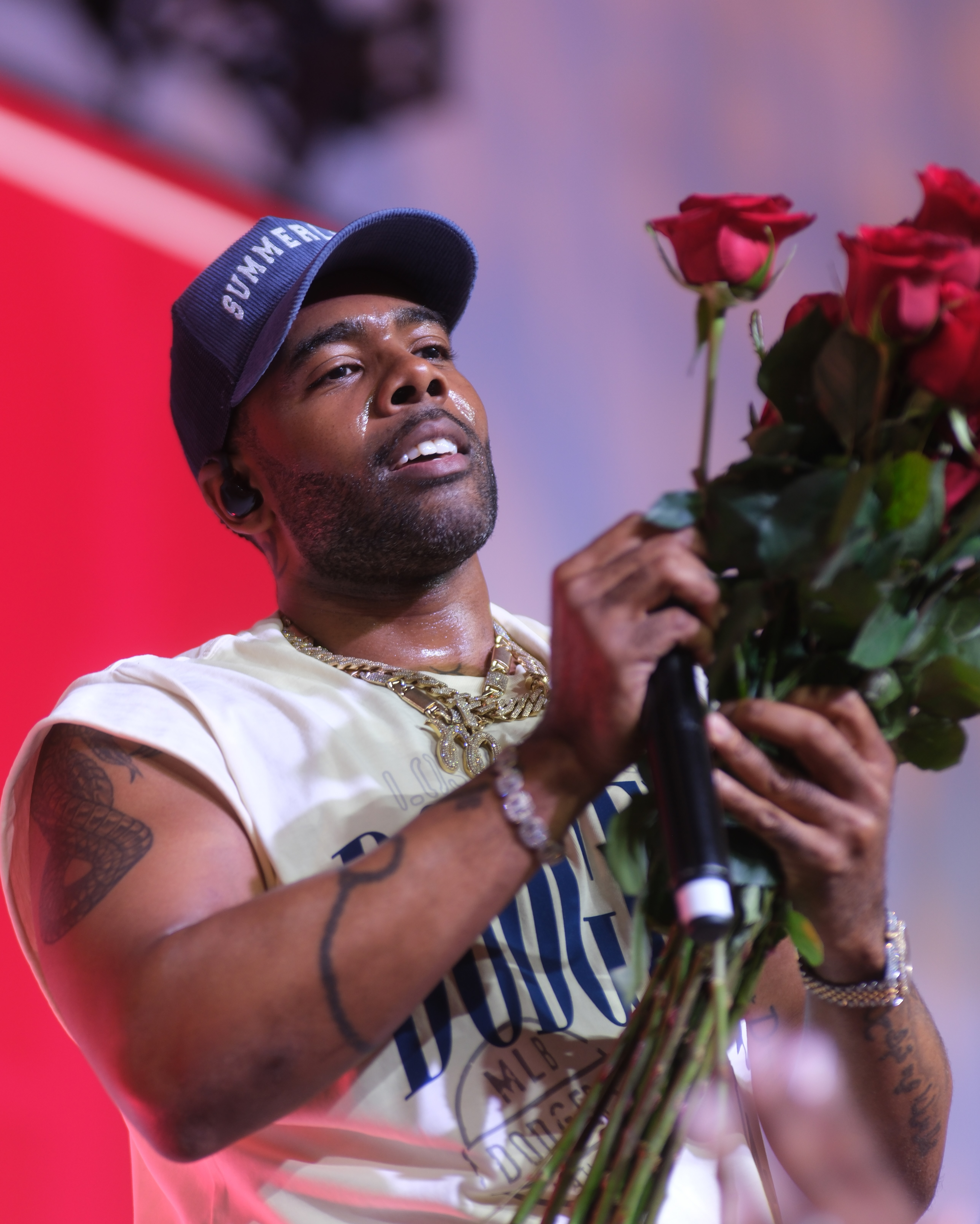
Mario

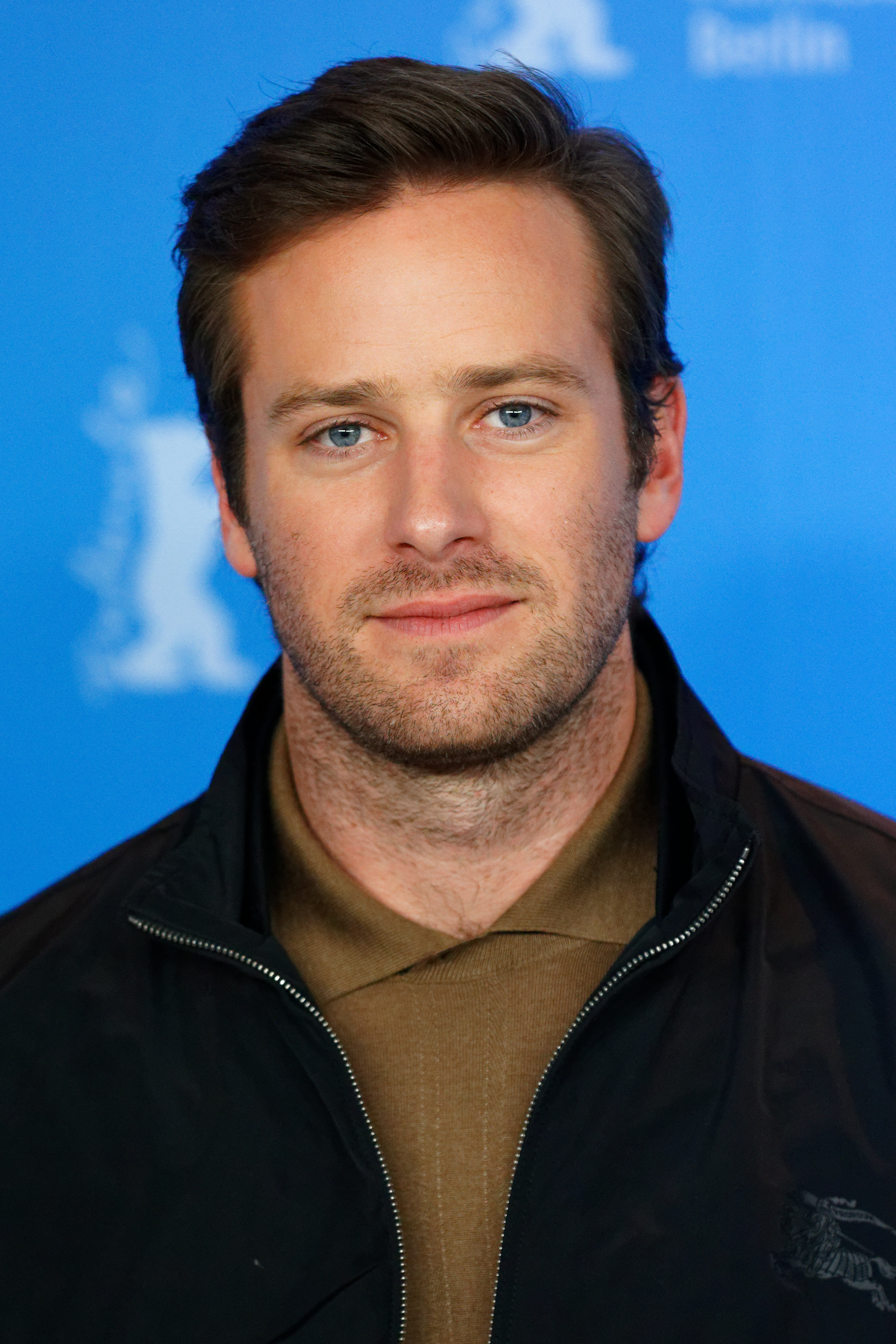
Armie Hammer

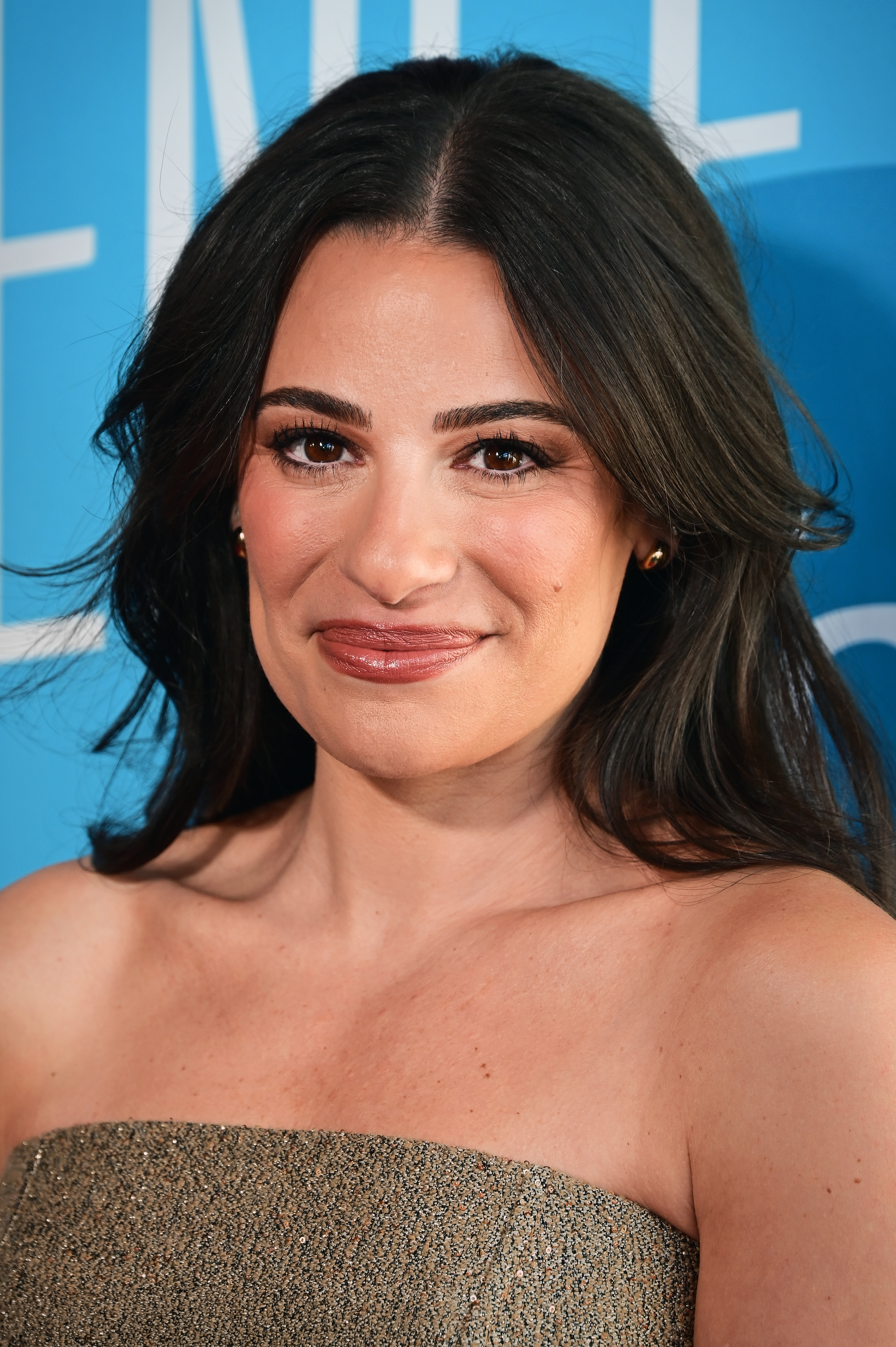
Lea Michele

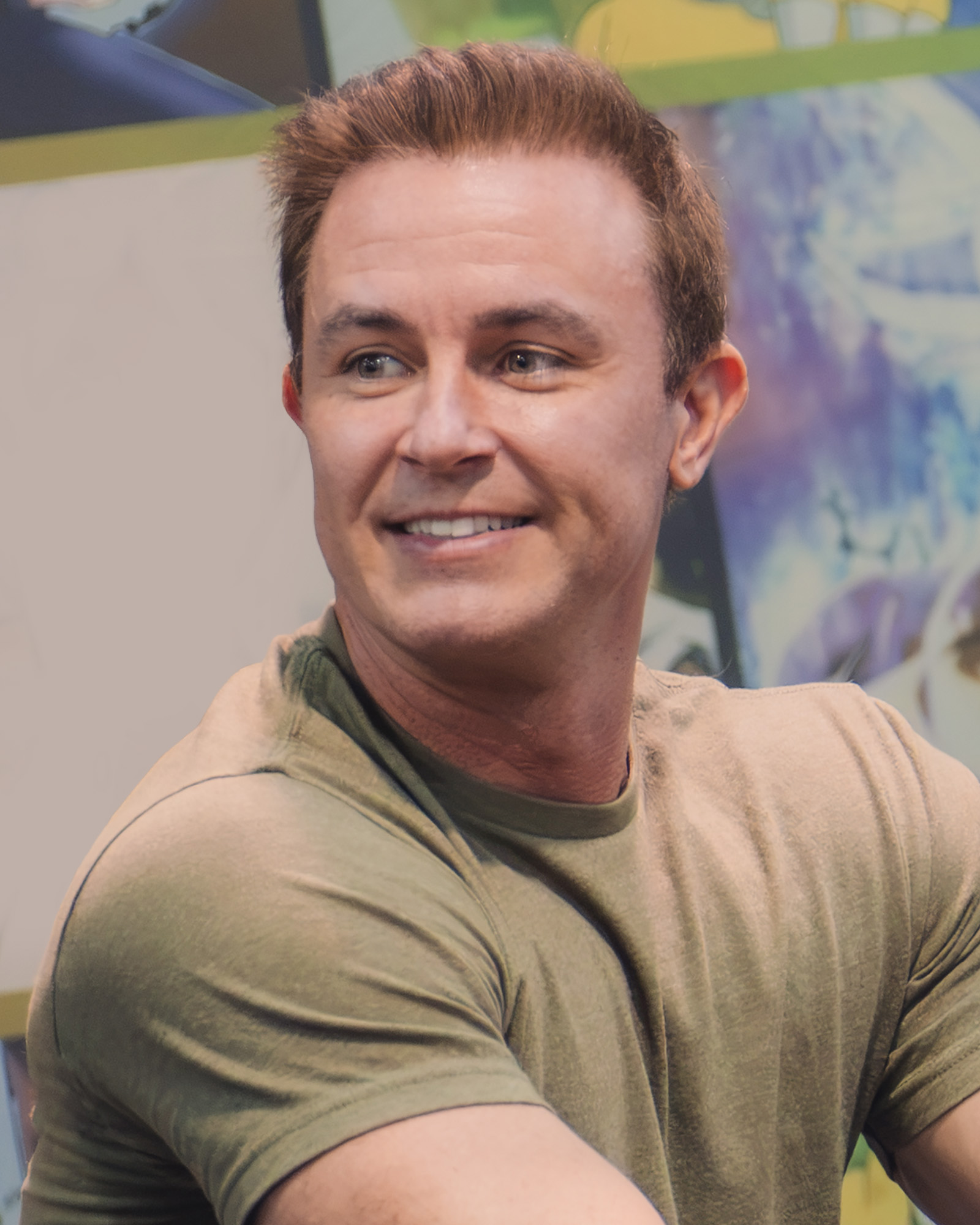
Ryan Kelley

- August 1
  - Brent Cobb, country singer/songwriter
  - Josh Harder, politician
  - Elijah Kelley, actor, singer, and dancer
- August 2
  - Dominique Barber, football player
  - Kesha Ram, politician
- August 3
  - Landon Cohen, football player
  - Tom Demmer, politician
  - Remy Le Boeuf, instrumentalist, musician, and composer
- August 4
  - Nick Augusto, drummer for Trivium (2009–2014) and Light the Torch (2016–2017)
  - Joique Bell, football player
  - Alex Castellanos, baseball player
- August 5
  - Brendon Ryan Barrett, actor and coach
  - Paula Creamer, golfer
  - Maria D'Luz, Mexican-born singer/songwriter
  - Tyler Herron, baseball player (d. 2021)
  - Blake Masters, venture capitalist, author, political candidate, and president of the Thiel Foundation
- August 6
  - Tony Bergstrom, football player
  - Erik Condra, ice hockey player
- August 7
  - Kevin Barnett, actor and comedian (d. 2019)
  - Keahu Kahuanui, actor
  - Katie Sowers, NFL football coach
- August 8
  - Brendan Blumer, entrepreneur, executive, and investor
  - Jackie Cruz, Dominican-born actress, singer, and model
  - Peyton List, actress
  - Chris Pressley, football player
- August 9
  - Patrick Cannone, ice hockey player
  - Magibon, YouTuber and internet personality
  - Telle Smith, singer, bassist for Greeley Estates (2008), and frontman for The Word Alive
- August 10
  - Steve Aponavicius football player
  - Ketia Swanier, basketball player
- August 11
  - Henry Corrales, mixed martial artist
  - Colby Rasmus, baseball player
  - Pablo Sandoval, Venezuelan-born baseball player
- August 12
  - Kyle Arrington, football player
  - Steve Cantwell, mixed martial artist
  - Alexis Sablone, skateboarder
- August 13
  - Demetrius Johnson, mixed martial artist
  - Wesley Taylor, actor and writer
- August 14 – Matt Castlen, politician
- August 15
  - Chad Beyer, cyclist
  - Jake Christensen, football player
  - Samantha Crain, singer/songwriter
  - Katie Gallagher, fashion designer
- August 16
  - Bill Morrissey, wrestler
  - Shawn Pyfrom, actor and singer
- August 17
  - Graham Bensinger, journalist
  - Leigh Ann Brown, soccer player
  - Piotr Czech, Polish-born football player
  - Deborah Feldman, American-born German writer
  - Bryton James, actor
  - Tyrus Thomas. basketball player
- August 18
  - Andy Bisek, wrestler
  - Lisa Chesson, hockey player
  - Tony Cruz, baseball player
  - Sam Mehran, pop and rock musician for the band Test Icicles (d. 2018)
  - Miesha Tate, mixed martial artist
- August 19
  - Austin Adams, baseball player
  - Drew Adams, lacrosse player
  - Nathan Brown, football player and coach
  - Carson Jones, boxer (d. 2025)
  - JTM, rapper
  - Christina Perri, pop and rock musician
- August 20
  - Tramaine Brock, football player
  - Shan Foster, basketball player
- August 21
  - Jason Boltus, football player
  - Shenea Booth, gymnast
  - Brooks Wheelan, actor, comedian and writer
- August 22
  - Andray Blatche, American-born Filipino basketball player
  - Tony Fiammetta, football player
- August 23
  - Ayron Jones, musician
  - Neil Cicierega, internet artist
- August 24
  - Nick Adenhart, baseball player (d. 2009)
  - Arian Foster, football player
  - Aaron Lee Tasjan, singer/songwriter
  - TaQuita Thorns, singer/songwriter
- August 25
  - Ervin Baldwin, football player
  - Rodney Ferguson, football player
- August 26
  - Jimmy P. Anderson, politician
  - Big K.R.I.T., rapper
  - Jane Bugaeva, Russian-born figure skater
  - Cassie Ventura, singer/songwriter, model, actress and dancer
- August 27
  - Joe Fitzgibbon, politician
  - Mario, singer/songwriter, actor, dancer, and model
- August 28
  - Baby Boy da Prince, rapper
  - Shelby Bach, author
  - Armie Hammer, actor
- August 29
  - Nicole Byer, comedian, actress, television host, podcaster, and author
  - Lea Michele, actress, singer and author
- August 30
  - Kaleb Konley, wrestler
  - Ryan Ross, guitarist for Panic! At the Disco
- August 31
  - Graham Biehl, sailor
  - Johnny Wactor, actor (d. 2024)
  - Ryan Kelley, actor

=== September ===
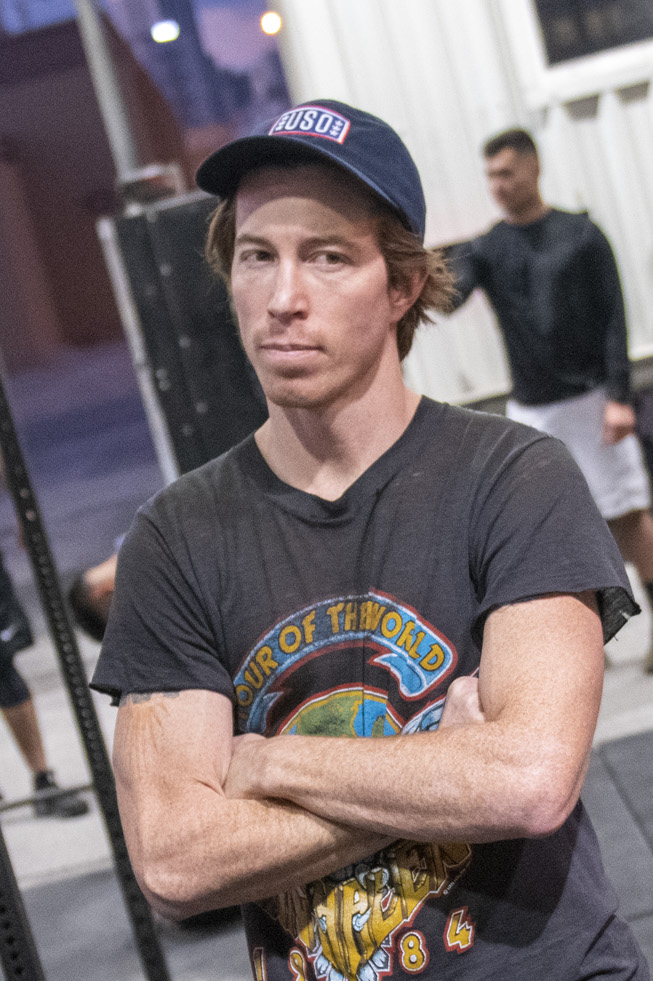
Shaun White

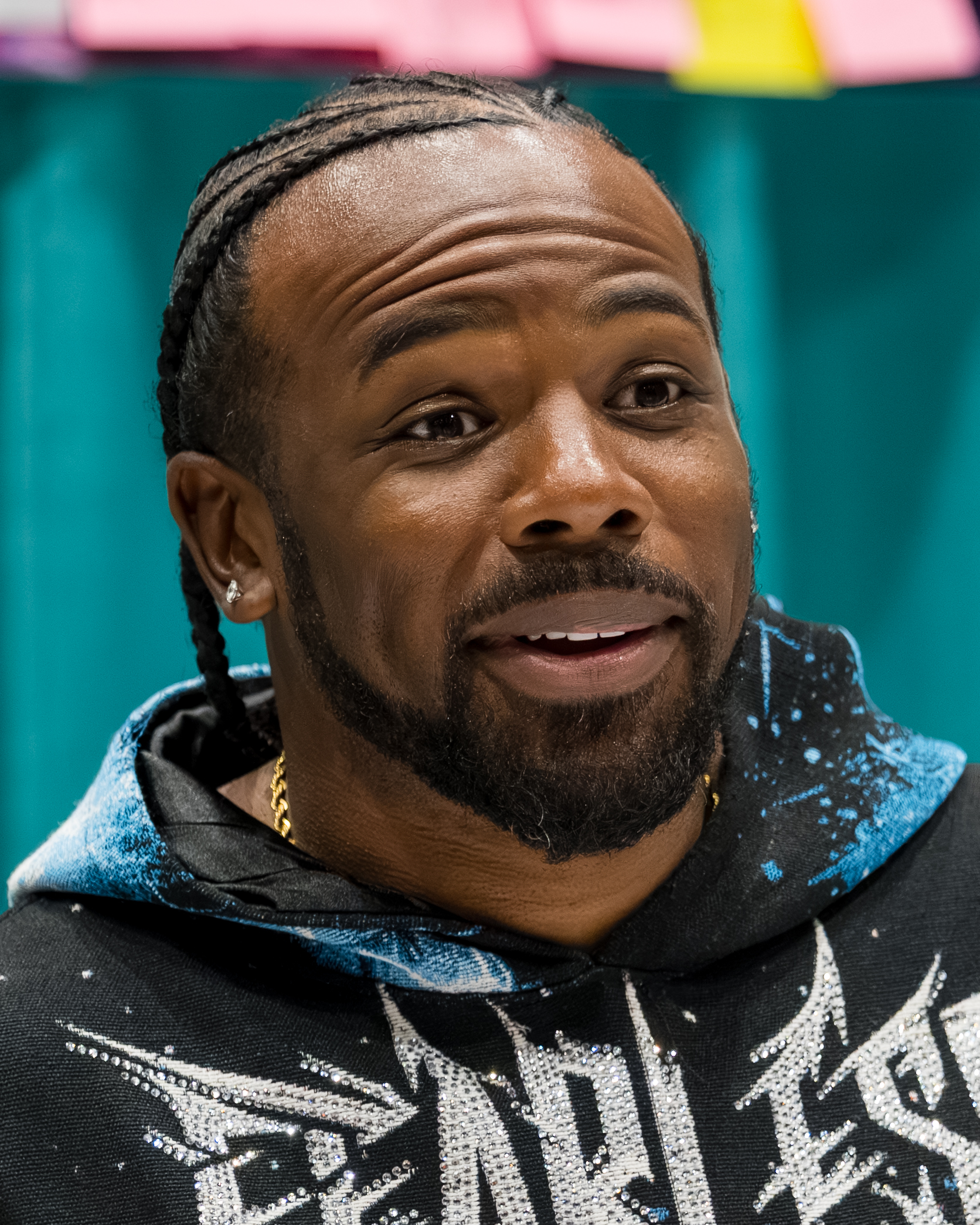
Xavier Woods

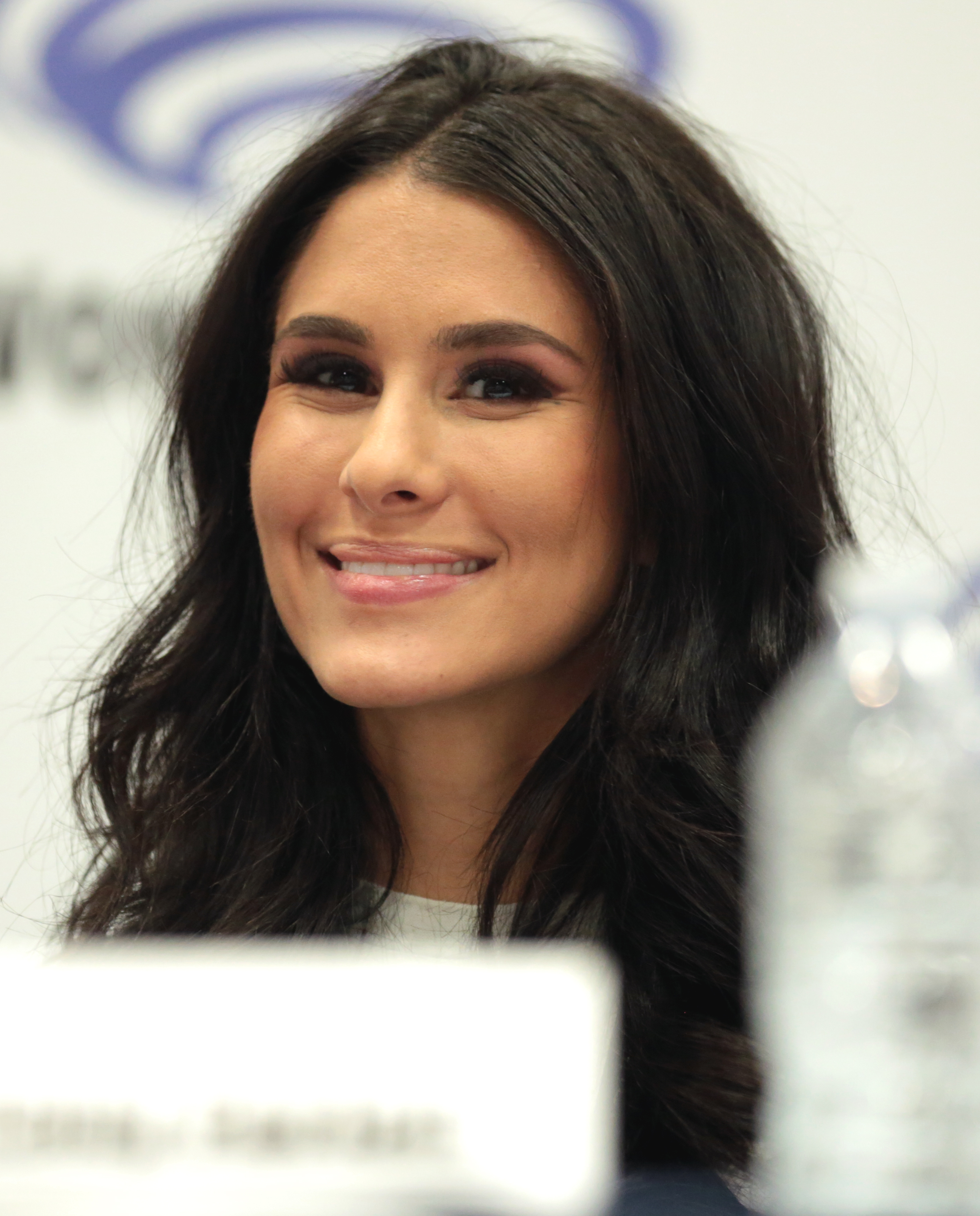
Brittany Furlan

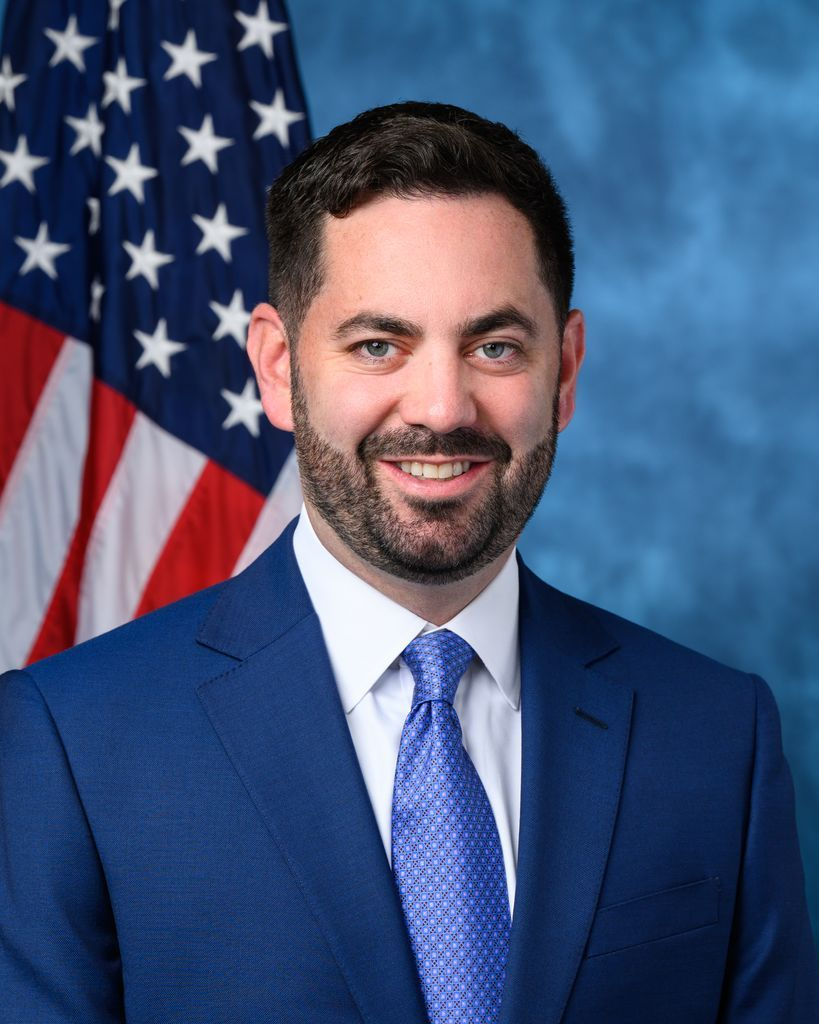
Mike Lawler

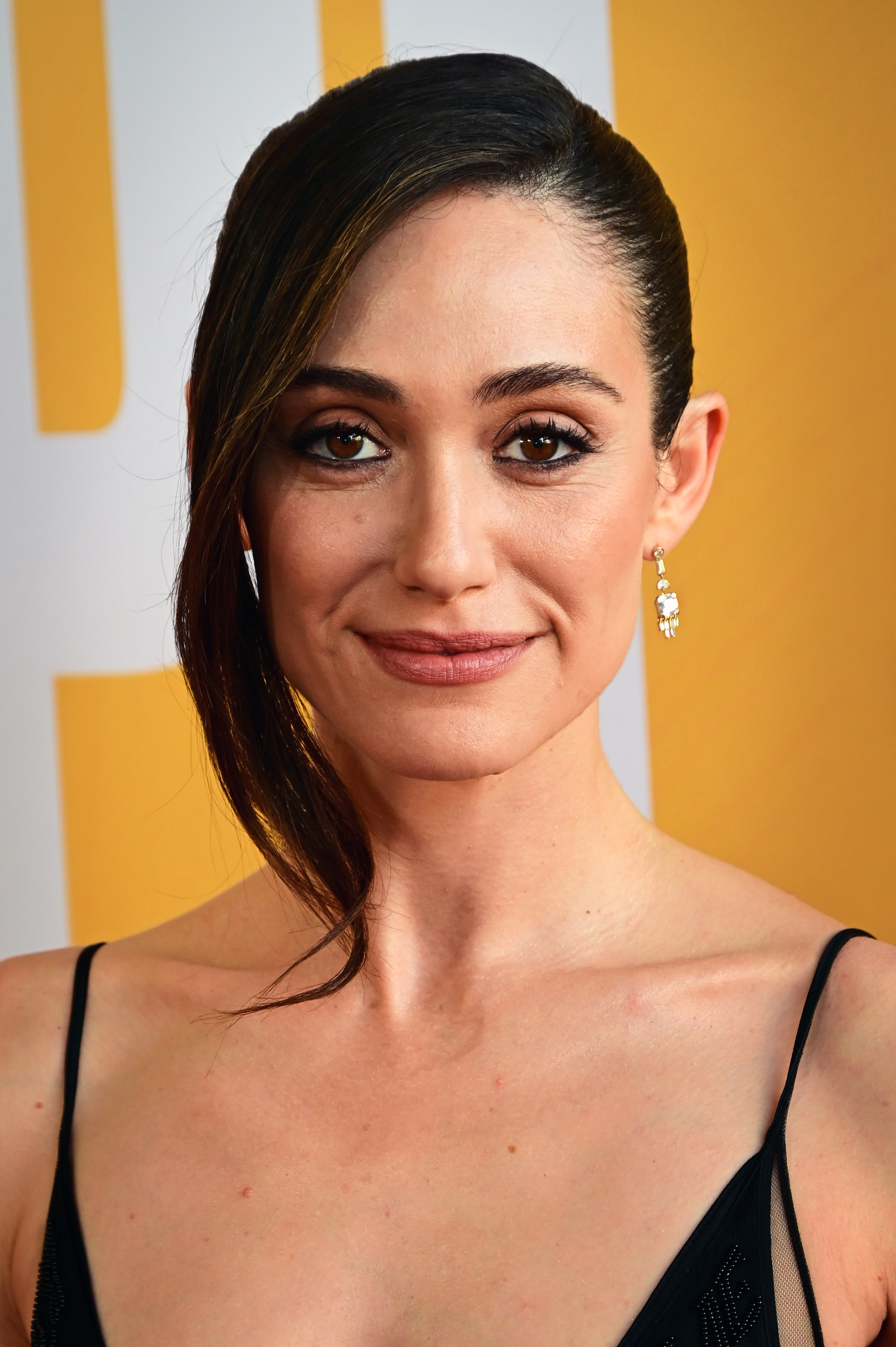
Emmy Rossum

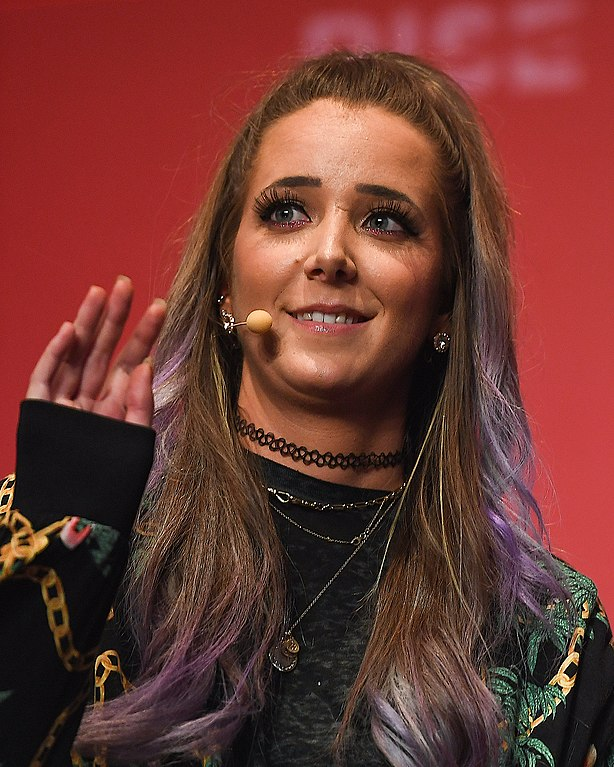
Jenna Marbles

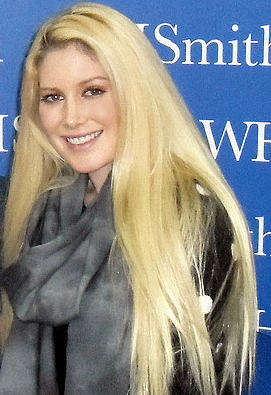
Heidi Montag

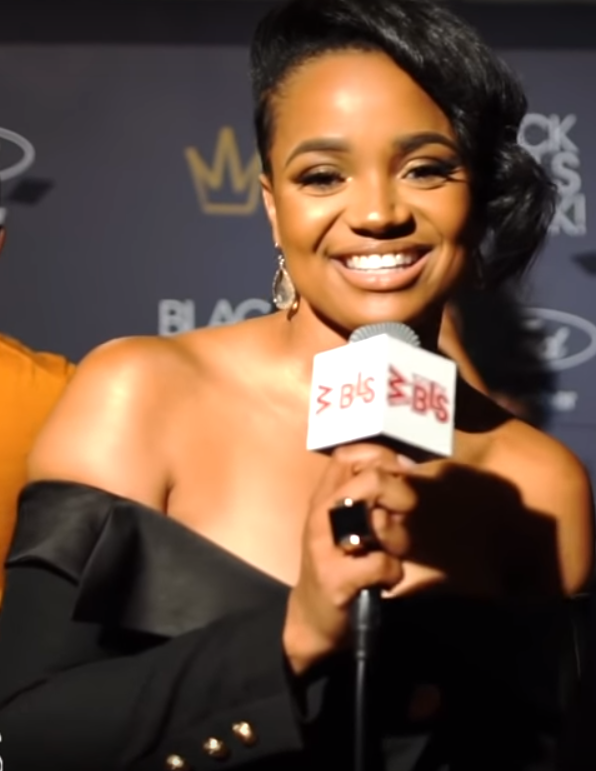
Kyla Pratt

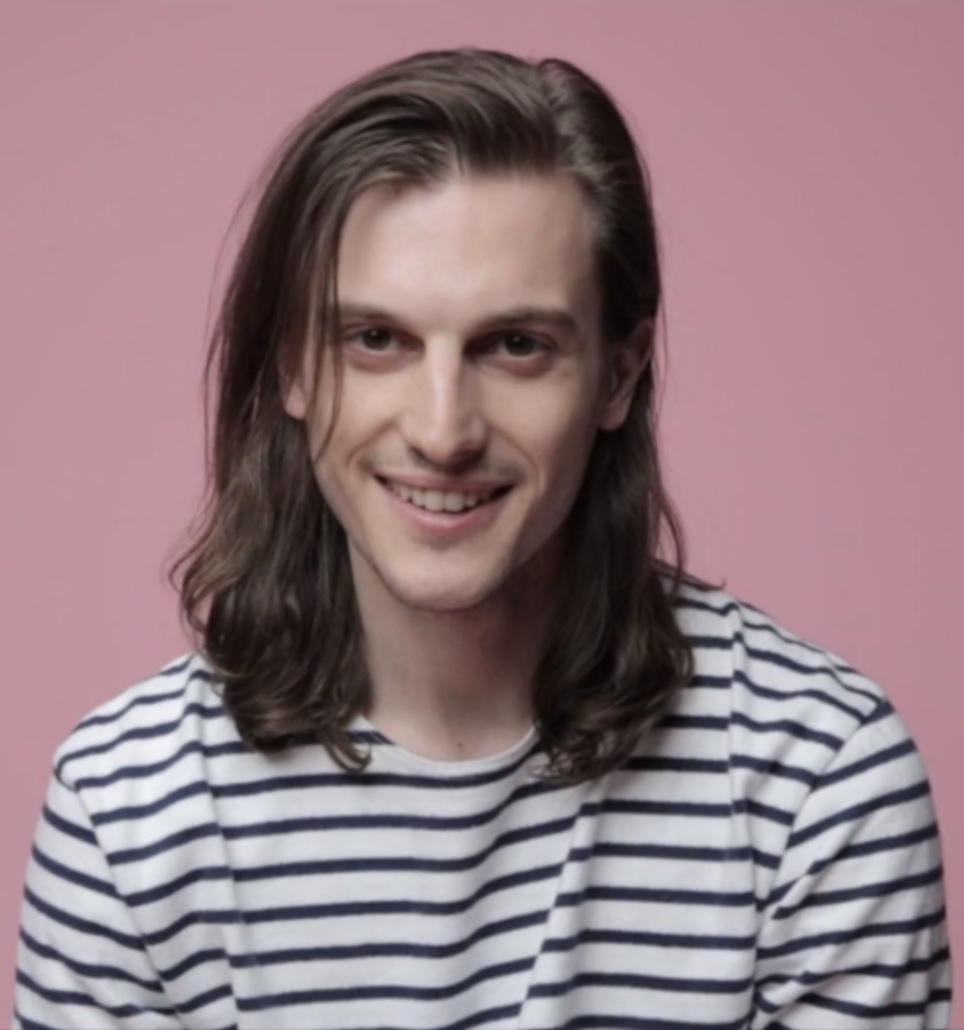
Peter Vack

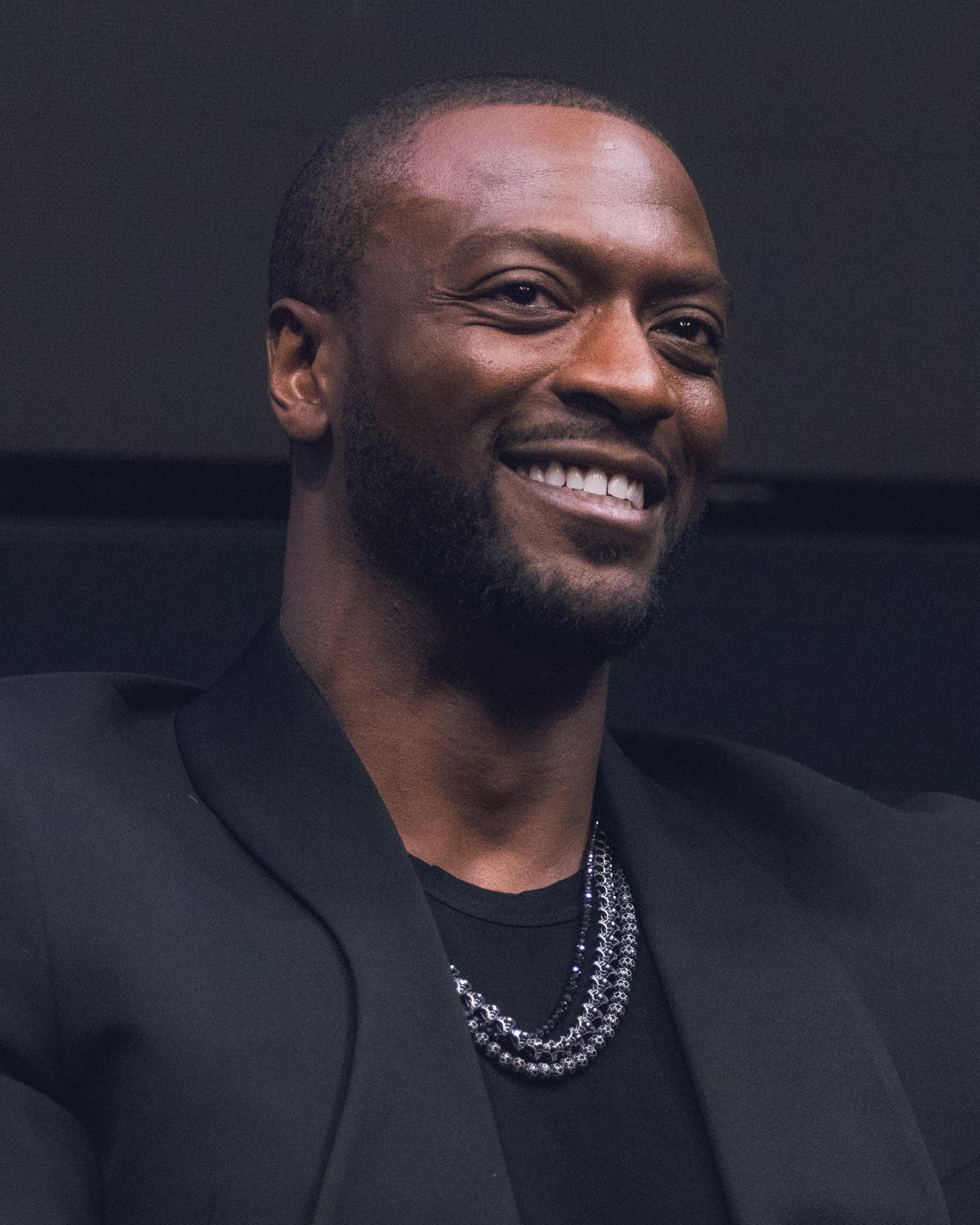
Aldis Hodge

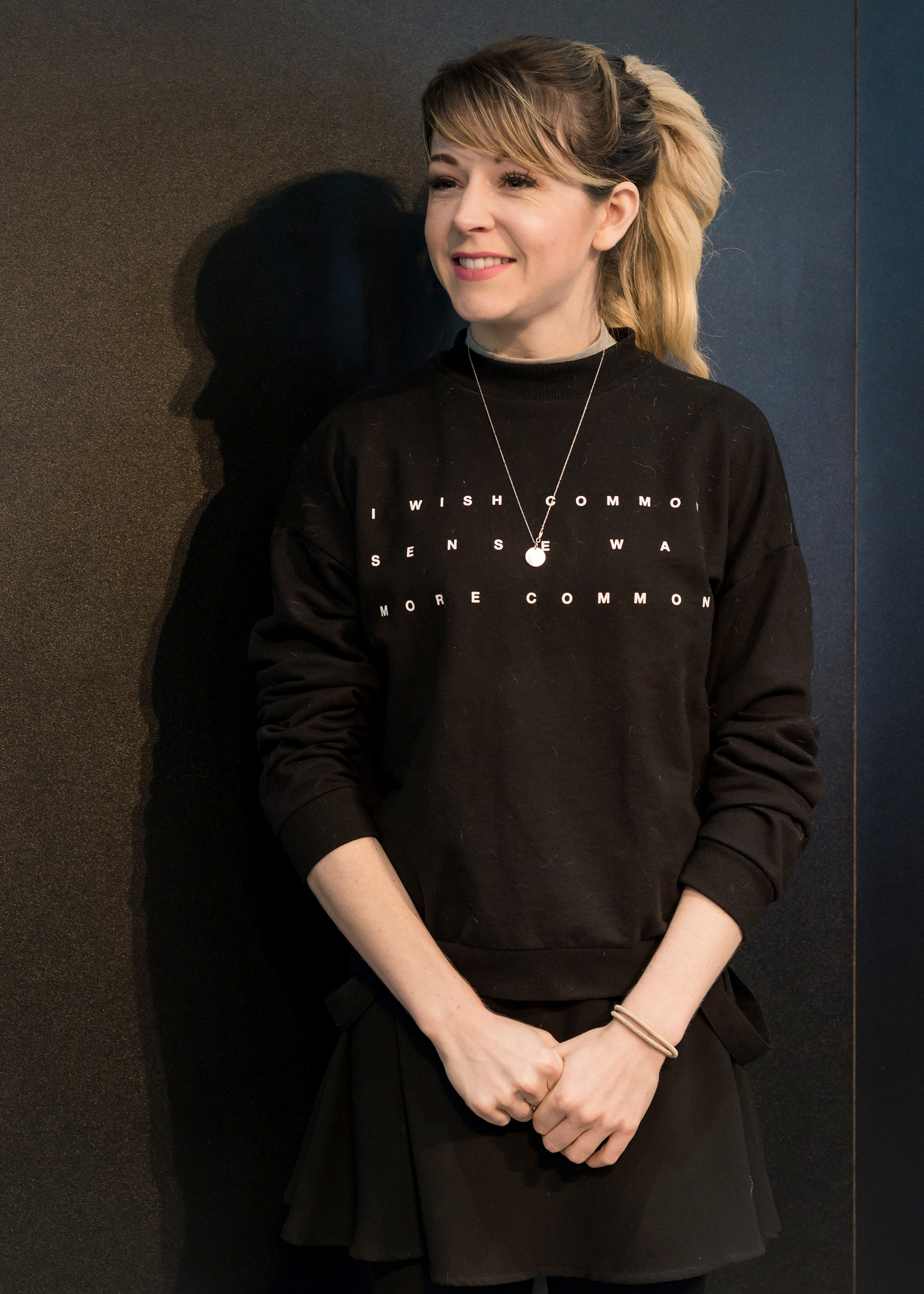
Lindsey Stirling

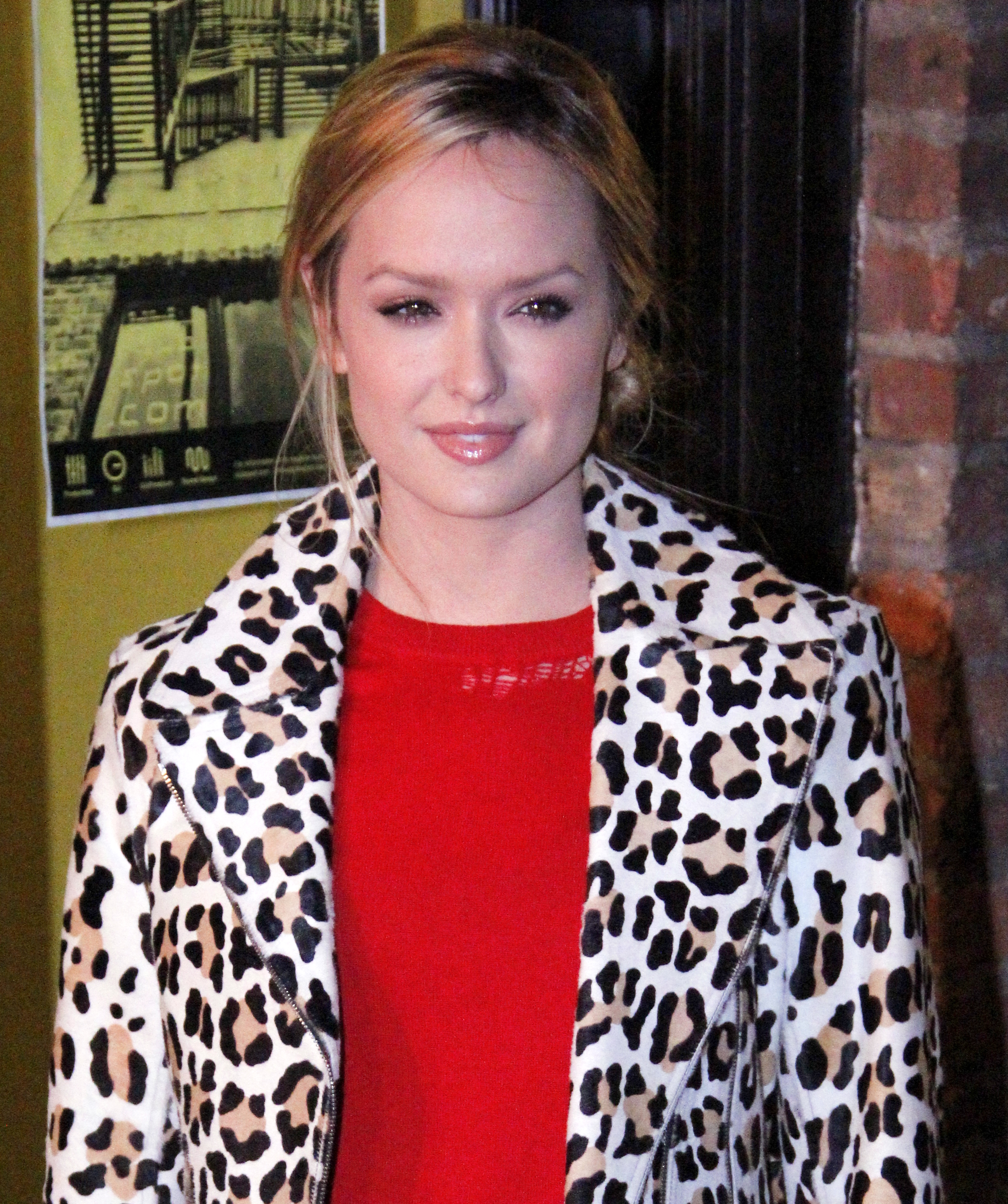
Kaylee DeFer

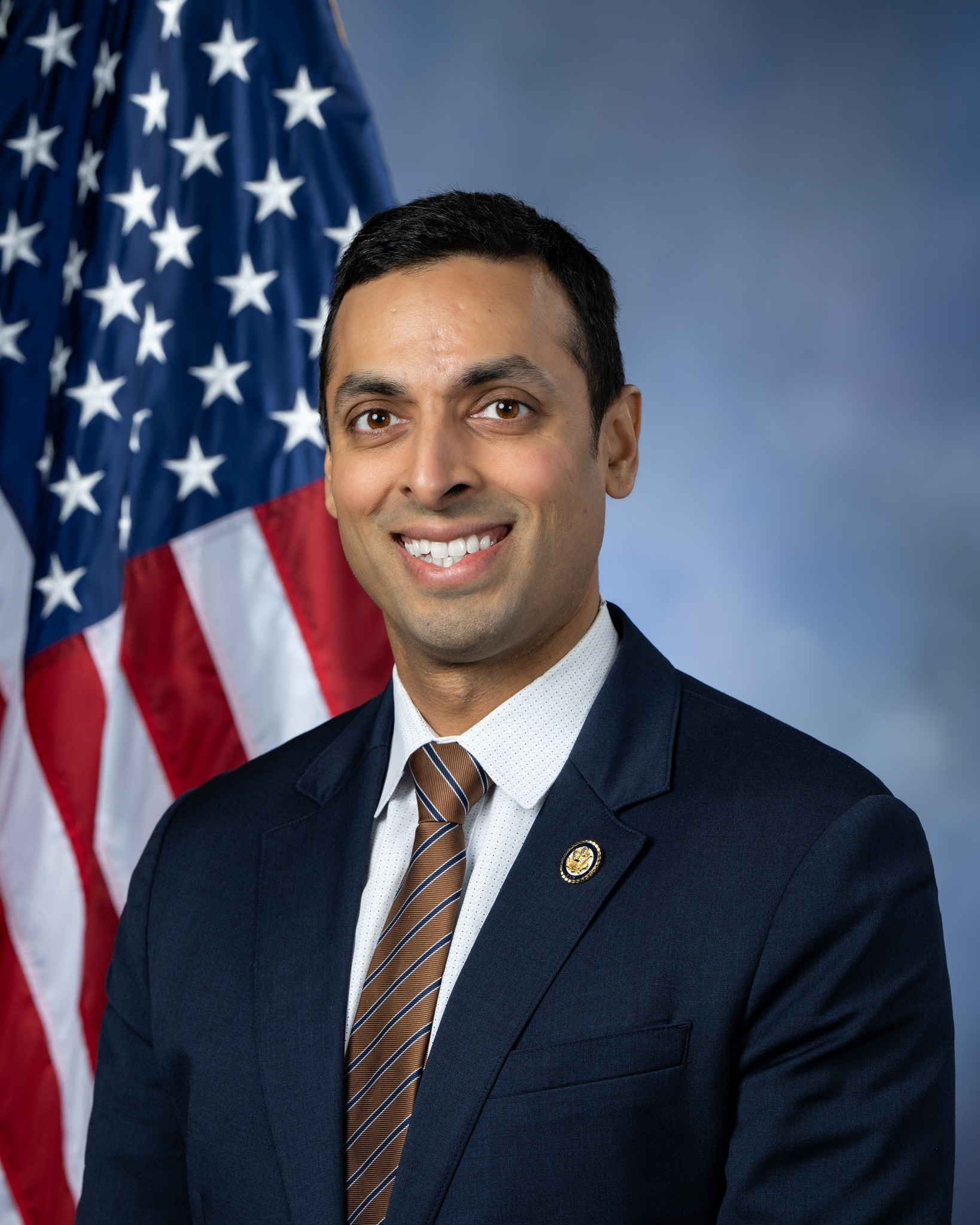
Suhas Subramanyam

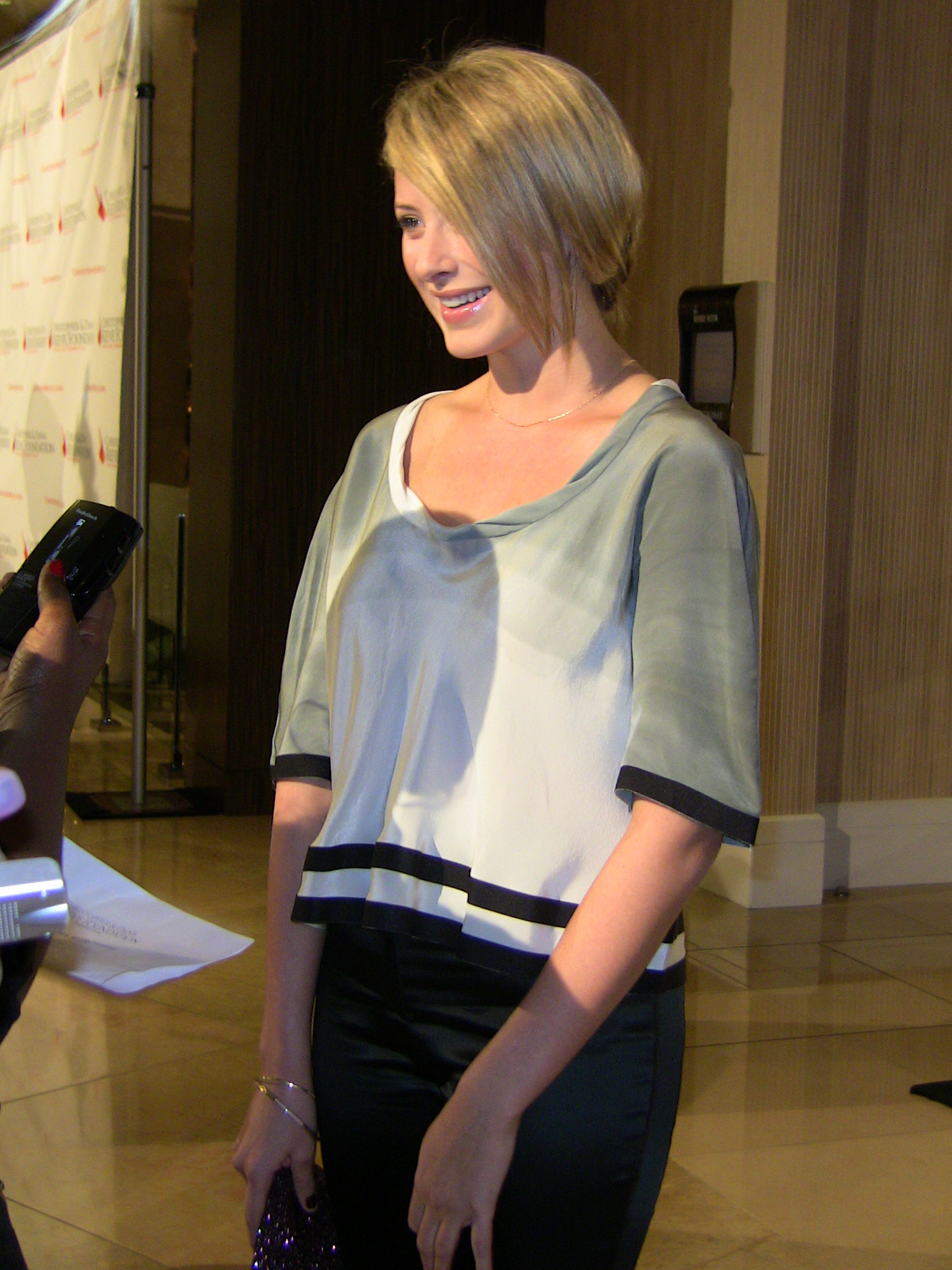
Lo Bosworth

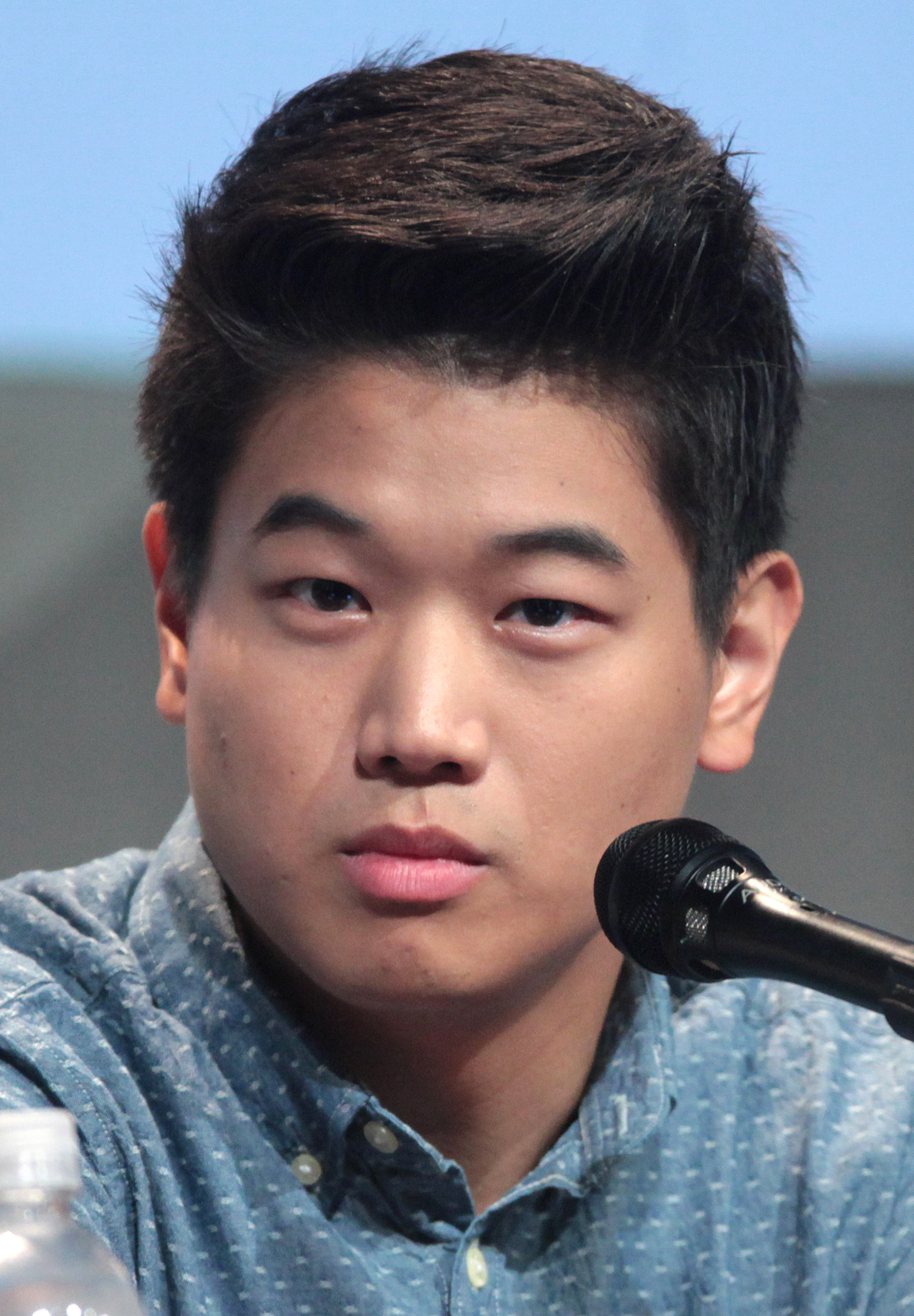
Ki Hong Lee

- September 1
  - Brian Broderick, baseball player
  - Calais Campbell, football player
  - Antonio Coleman, football player
  - Sidney Rice, football player
- September 2
  - Dimple Ajmera, Indian-born politician
  - Jordon Banfield, baseball coach
  - Corey Cogdell, Olympic trapshooter
  - Evan Crawford, baseball player
- September 3
  - Brandon Beachy, baseball player
  - Lorenz Larkin, mixed martial artist
  - Shaun White, snowboarder and skateboarder
- September 4
  - Jaclyn Hales, actress
  - Xavier Woods, wrestler
- September 5
  - John Bartholomew, chess player
  - Nicholas Ciarelli, journalist
  - Raphael Cruz, acrobat and actor (d. 2018)
  - Brittany Furlan, internet personality and comedian
  - Ezra Furman, singer/songwriter and frontman for Ezra Furman and the Harpoons
  - Nate Ness, football player
  - Davida Williams, actress. director, and producer
- September 6
  - Darmirra Brunson, actress, comedian, and singer
  - Ryan Clady, football player
  - Raven Riley, pornographic actress
- September 7
  - Colin Delaney, wrestler
  - Troy Nolan, football player
- September 8
  - Leah LaBelle, singer/songwriter (d. 2018)
  - Logan Schafer, baseball player
- September 9
  - Stanley Arnoux, football player
  - Michael Bowden, baseball player
  - Steven Cisar, BMX rider
  - Bobby Green, mixed martial artist
  - Jason Lamy-Chappuis, American-born, French Olympic skier
  - Mike Lawler, politician
- September 10
  - Ashley Monroe, country singer
  - Zach Arnett, football player and coach
  - Ginger Costa-Jackson, Italian-born opera singer
  - Henrique Couto, writer and director
  - Greg Garbowsky, musician
  - Traci Stumpf, actress and comedian
  - TAC, football player and wrestler
- September 11
  - Kyle Blanks, baseball player
  - Andrew Cashner, baseball player
  - Dwayne Jarrett, football player
  - LaToya Sanders, basketball player
  - Cletus Seldin, boxer
- September 12
  - Andre Ricks, basketball player and owner of Rawimpact clothing brand
  - Emmy Rossum, actress and singer
- September 14
  - Greg Boone, football player
  - Dane Fletcher, football player
  - Shannon Kane, actress
  - Harrison Greenbaum, comedian
  - A. J. Trauth, actor and musician
- September 15
  - Kevin Barnes, football player
  - Jeremy Boone, football player
  - Kyle Carr, Olympic speed skater
  - Dionte Christmas, basketball player
  - Jenna Marbles, YouTuber
  - Heidi Montag, TV personality
- September 16
  - Gordon Beckham, baseball player
  - Matt Fodge, football player
  - Ian Harding, German-born actor
  - Kyla Pratt, actress and musician
  - Nikko Jenkins, spree killer
  - Michael James Shaw, actor and writer
- September 17
  - Wes Allen, soccer player
  - Emily Cook, beauty pageant titleholder
  - Abby Rosmarin, model and writer
- September 18
  - Kyle Burkhart, football player
  - Danielle Jonas, reality TV personality
- September 19
  - Stephanie Allynne, actress, writer, and comedian
  - Mandy Musgrave, actress
  - Ryan Succop, football player
  - Peter Vack, actor
- September 20
  - Jordan Chariton, investigative reporter
  - Courtney Fells, basketball player
  - Aldis Hodge, actor
  - A.J. Ramos, baseball player
- September 21
  - Brad Benjamin, golfer
  - Robby Blackwell, singer/songwriter, producer, and instrumentalist
  - Grete Eliassen, American-born Norwegian Olympic freestyle skier
  - Lindsey Stirling, violinist, dancer, performance artist, and composer
- September 22
  - David Arconti, politician
  - Jon Bass, actor
  - Nathaniel Brazill, convicted murderer
  - Derek Cox, football player
  - Heather Dorff, actress, writer, and producer
  - Jennifer Elie, tennis player
  - Wesley Harris, politician
  - Artemio Reyes, boxer
  - Chris Schwinden, baseball player
- September 23 – Kaylee DeFer, actress
- September 24
  - Leah Dizon, singer and model
  - Eloise Mumford, actress
- September 25
  - Steve Forrest, drummer
  - Jamie Franks, soccer player
- September 26
  - Brooke Allison, singer
  - Ned Crotty, lacrosse player
  - Sean Doolittle, baseball player
  - Scot Kerns, politician
  - Suhas Subramanyam, politician
- September 27
  - Brian Ackley, soccer player
  - Matt Shoemaker, baseball player
- September 28
  - Mari Andrew, writer, speaker, and illustrator
  - Jermelle Cudjo, football player
- September 29
  - Lo Bosworth, TV personality and CEO of Love Wellness
  - Lisa Foiles, actress, presenter, video game journalist, model, and author
  - Matt Lashoff, hockey player
  - Jordan Norwood, football player
  - Zac Robinson, football player and coach
  - Zach Stewart, baseball player
- September 30
  - James Barnett, entrepreneur and community activist
  - Ki Hong Lee, South Korean-born actor

=== October ===
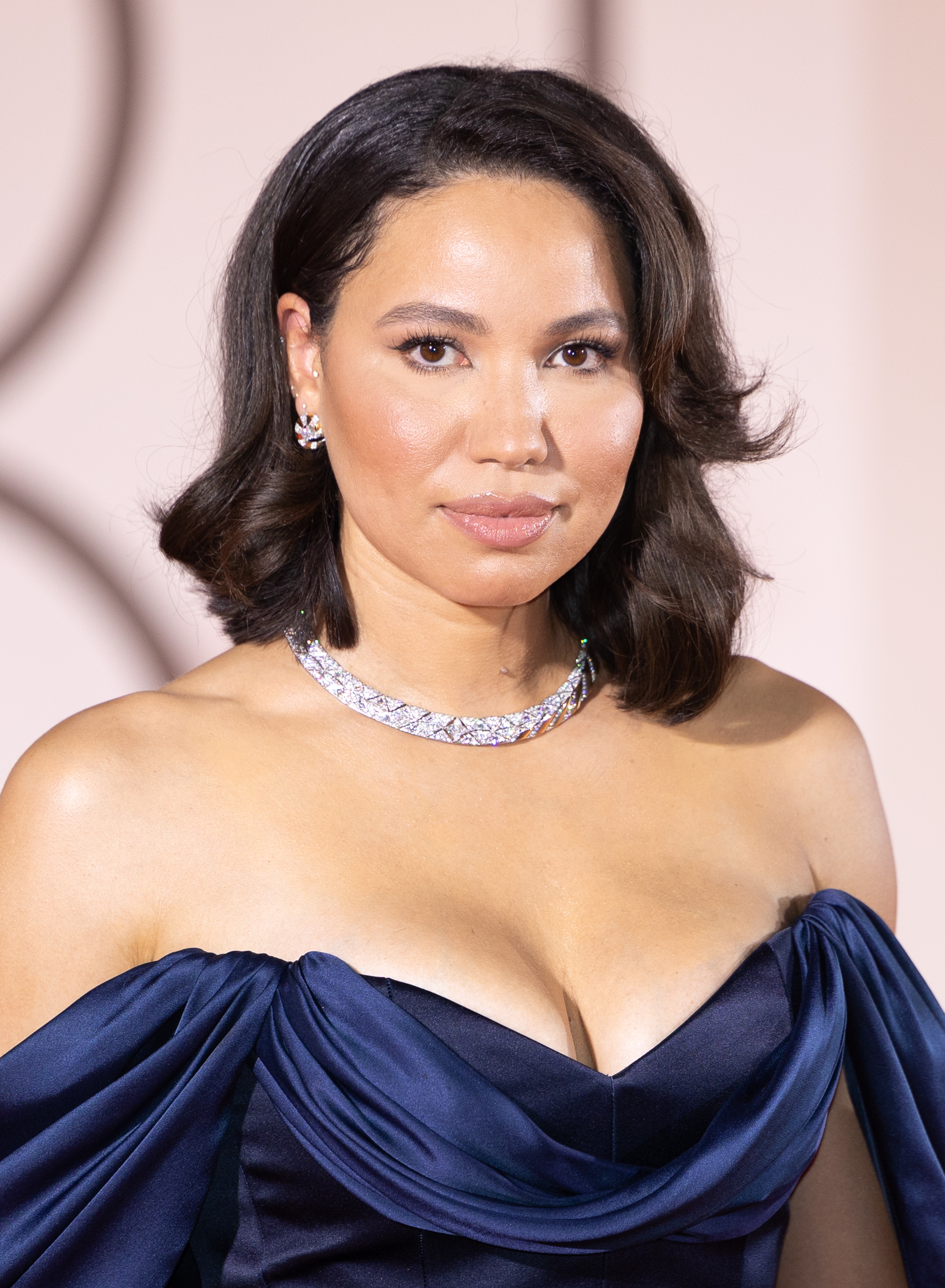
Jurnee Smollett

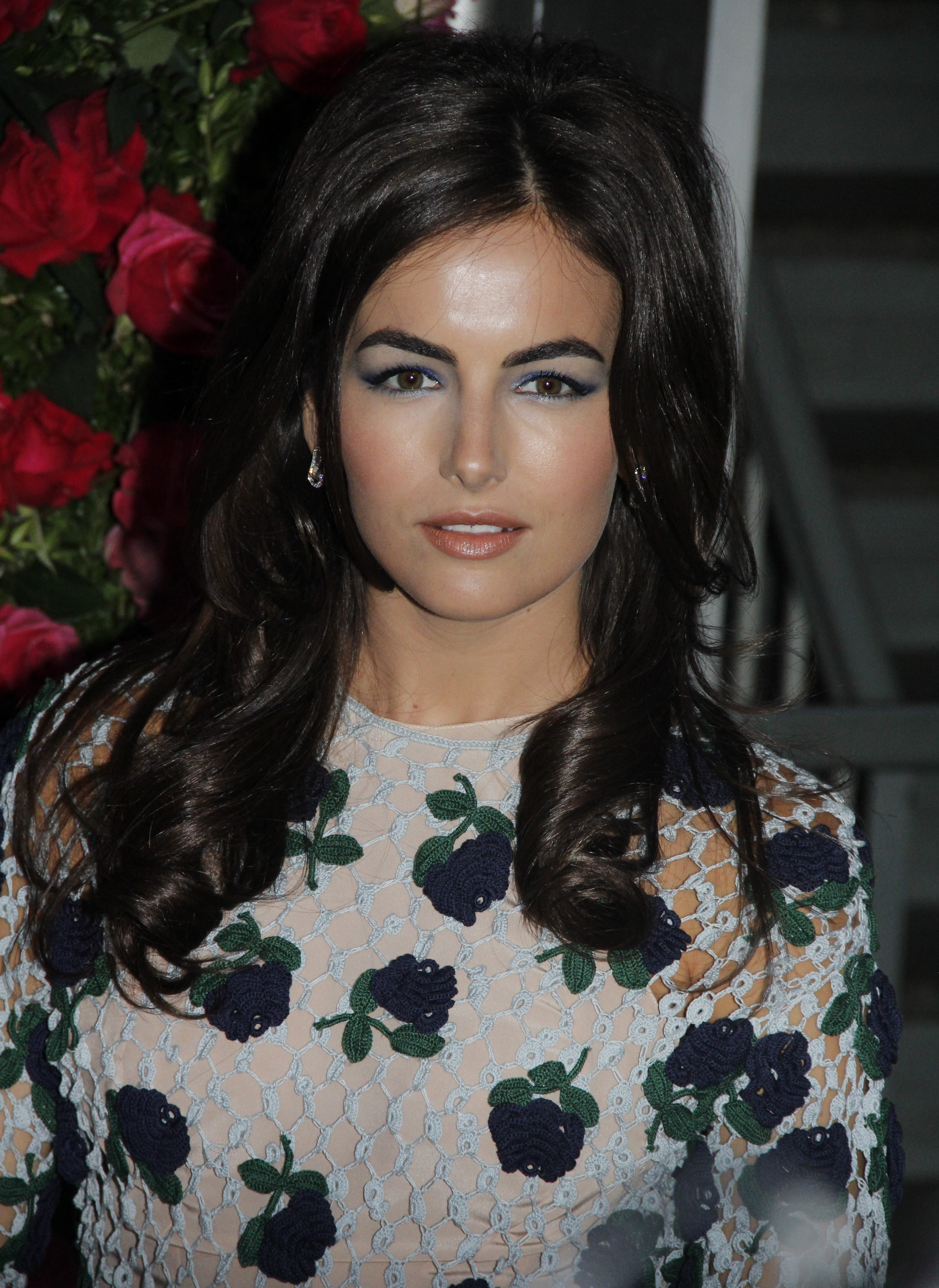
Camilla Belle

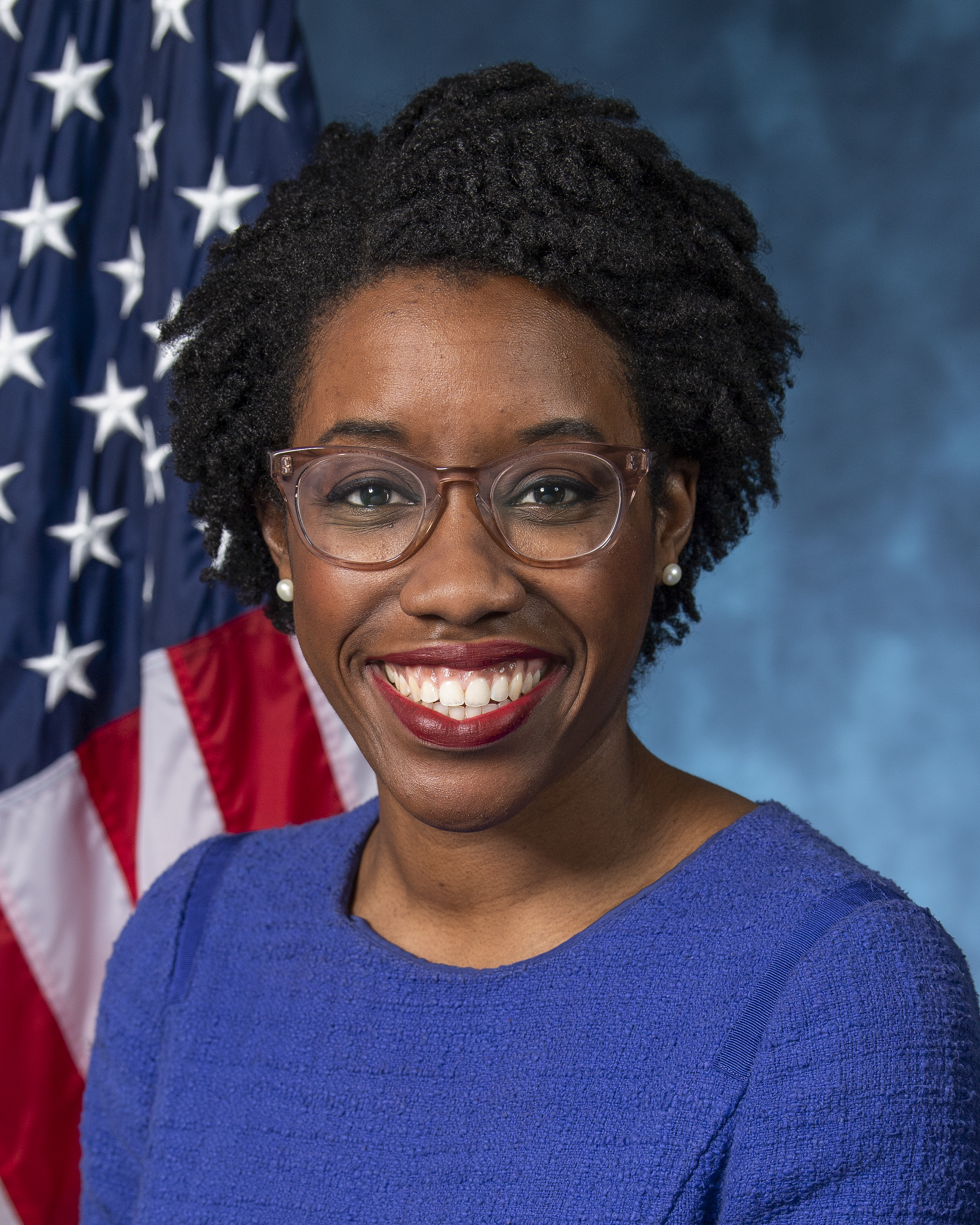
Lauren Underwood

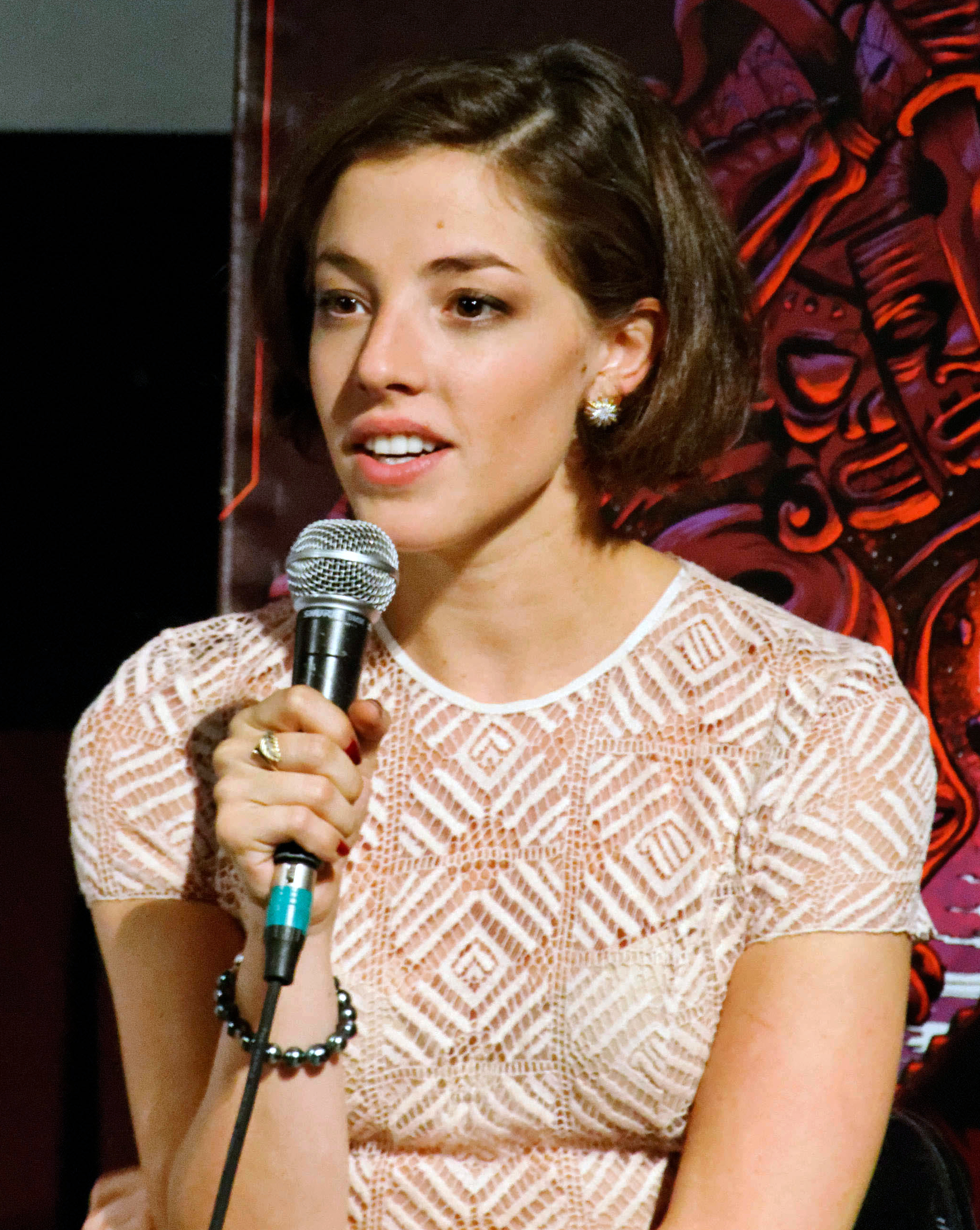
Olivia Thirlby

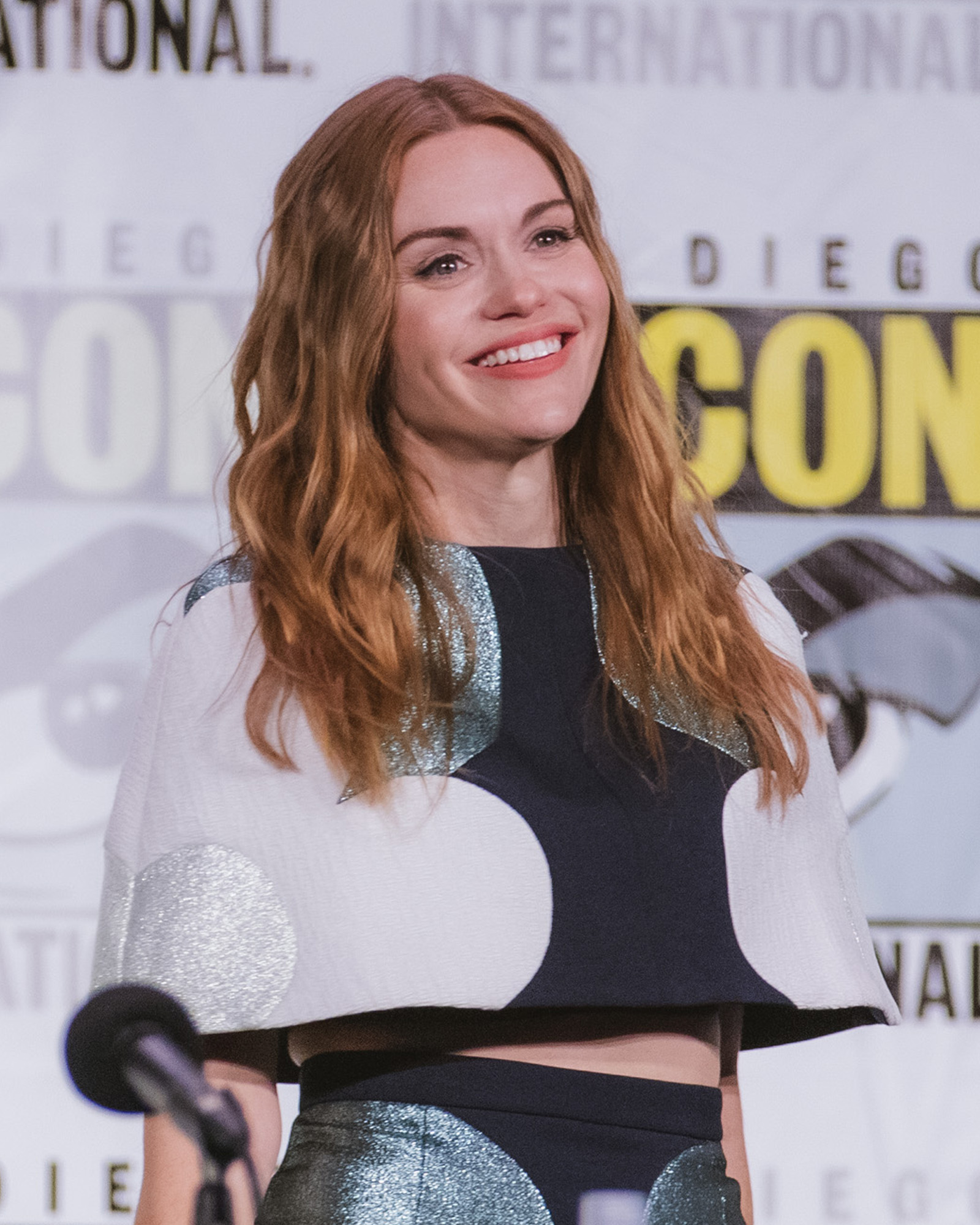
Holland Roden

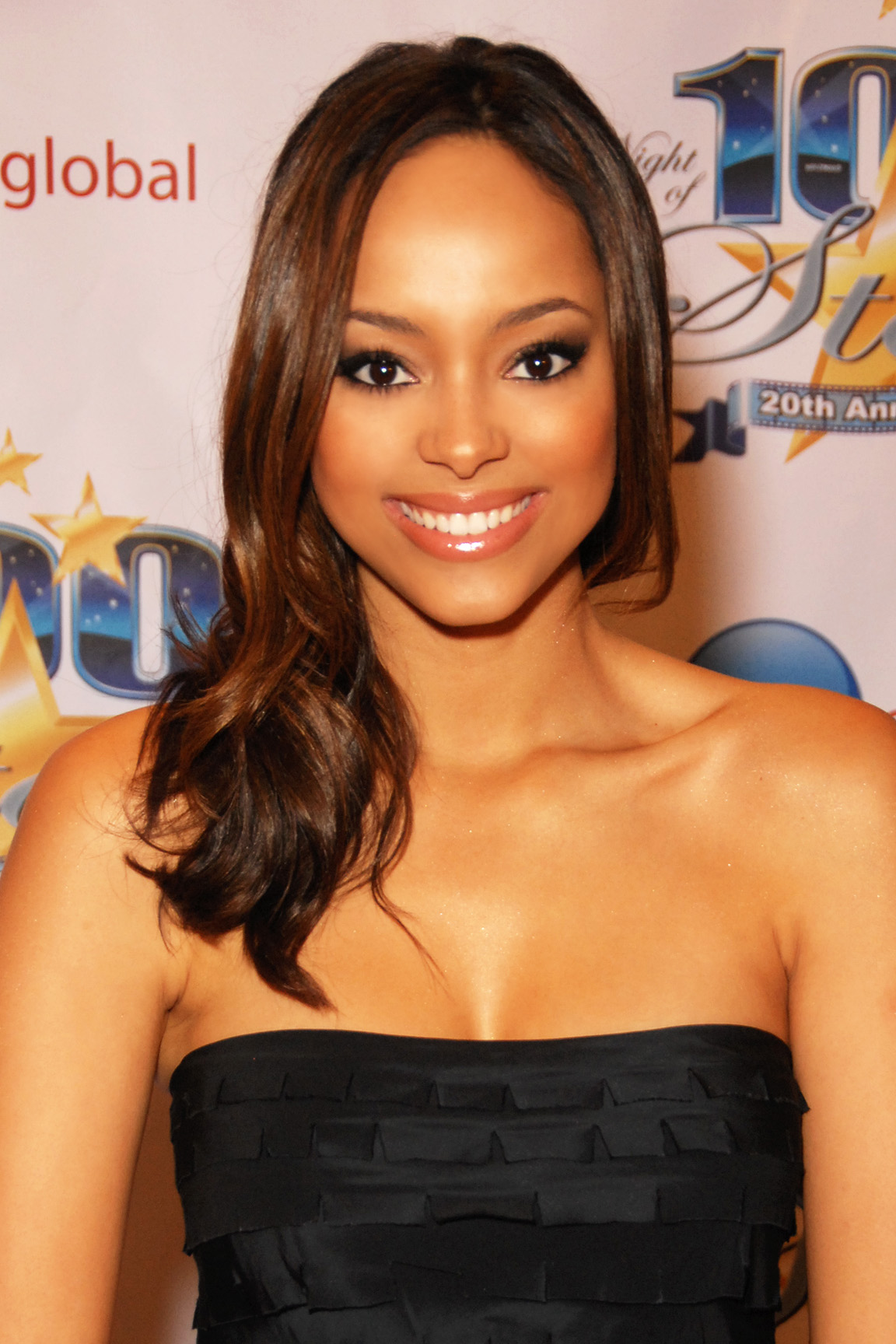
Amber Stevens West

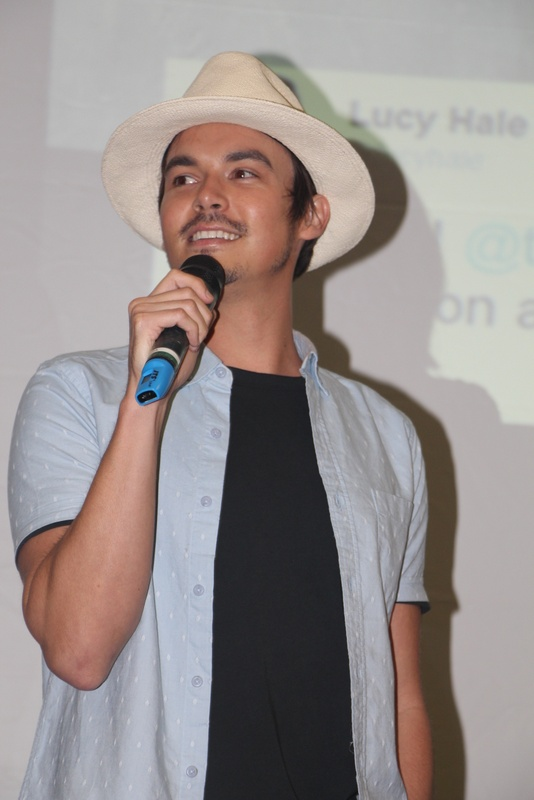
Tyler Blackburn

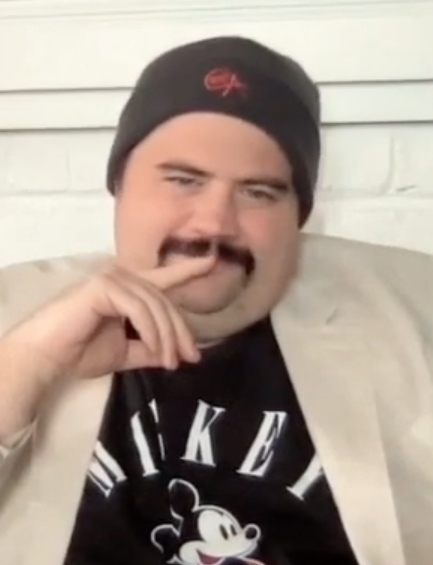
Paul Walter Hauser

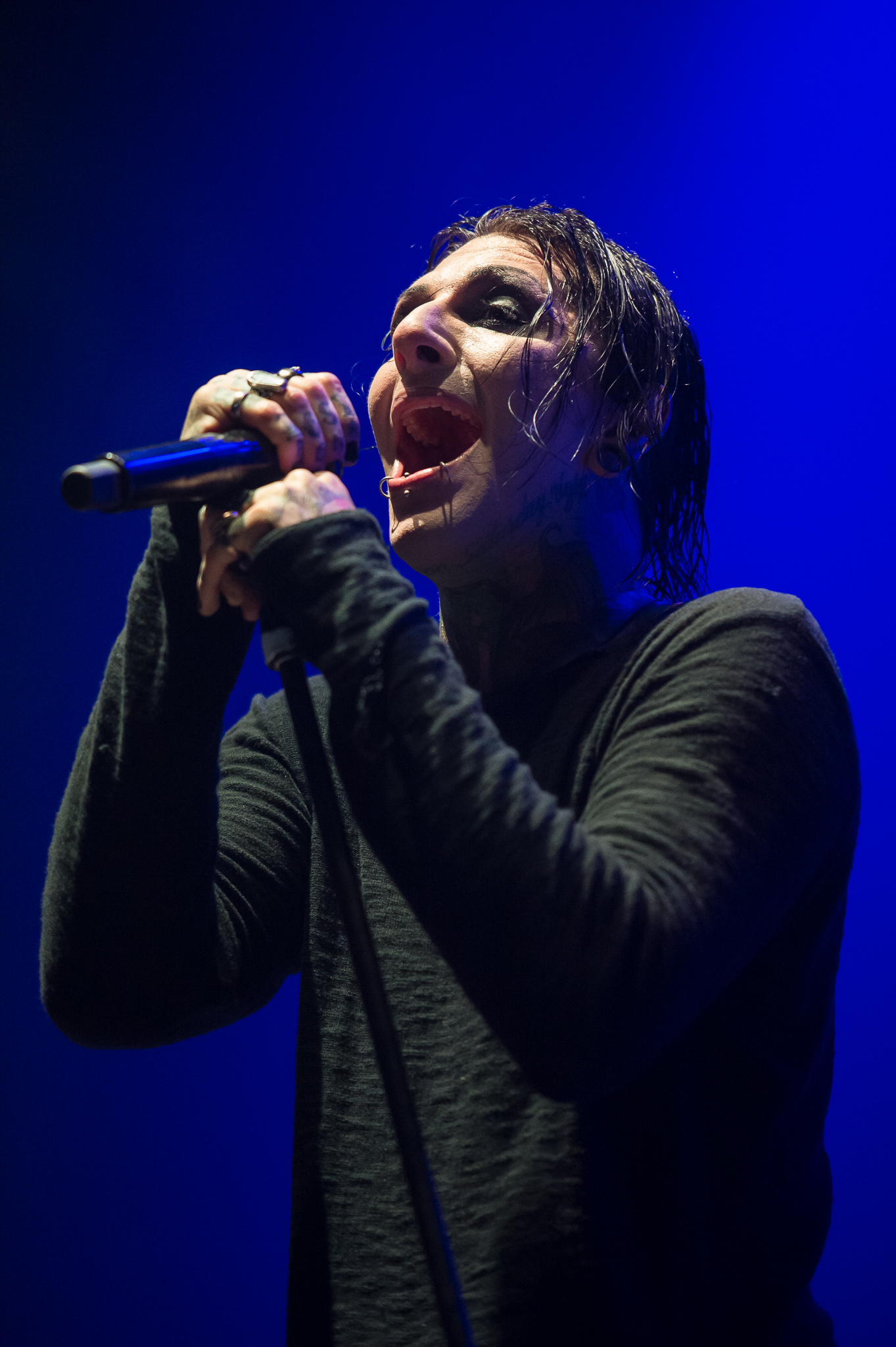
Chris Motionless

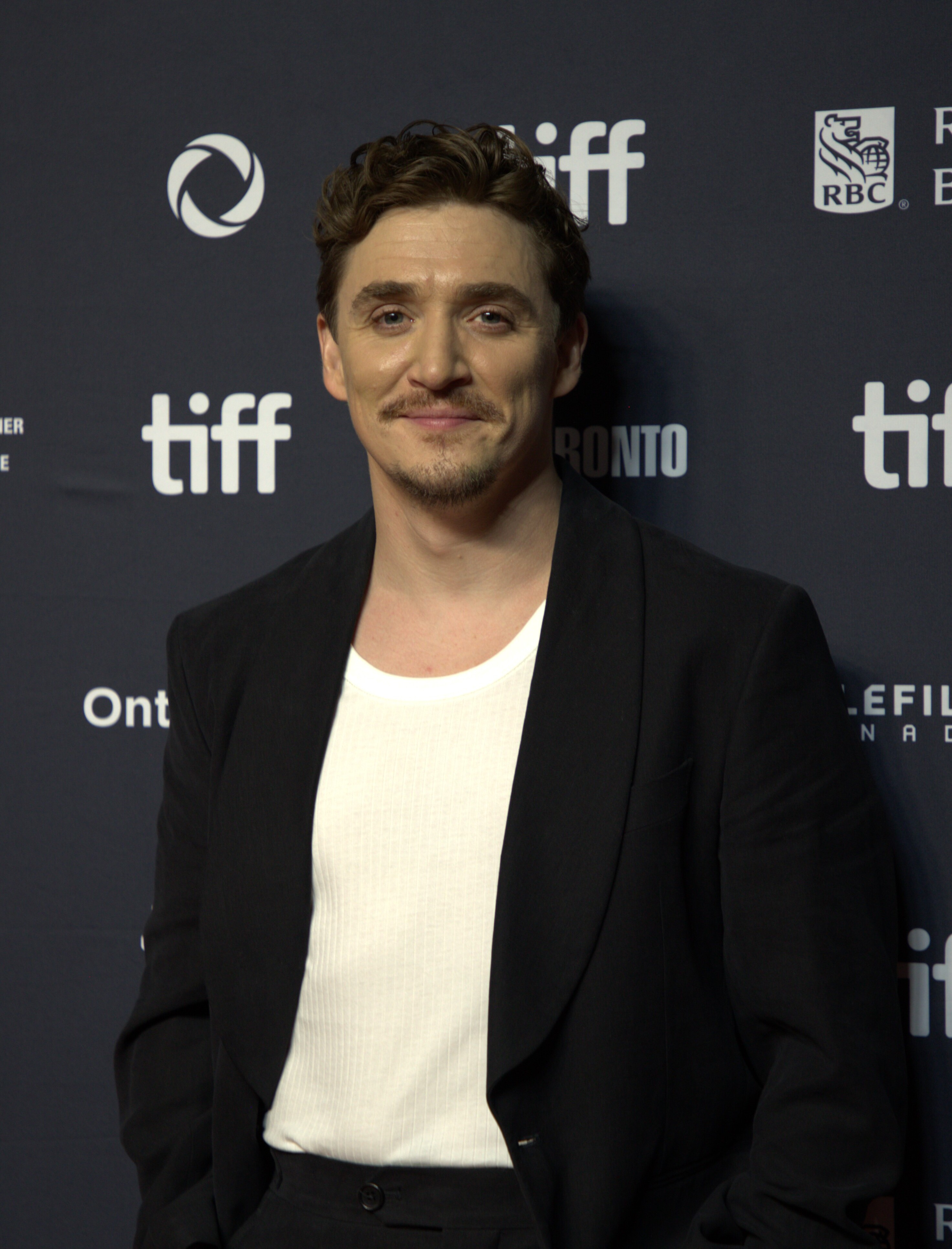
Kyle Gallner

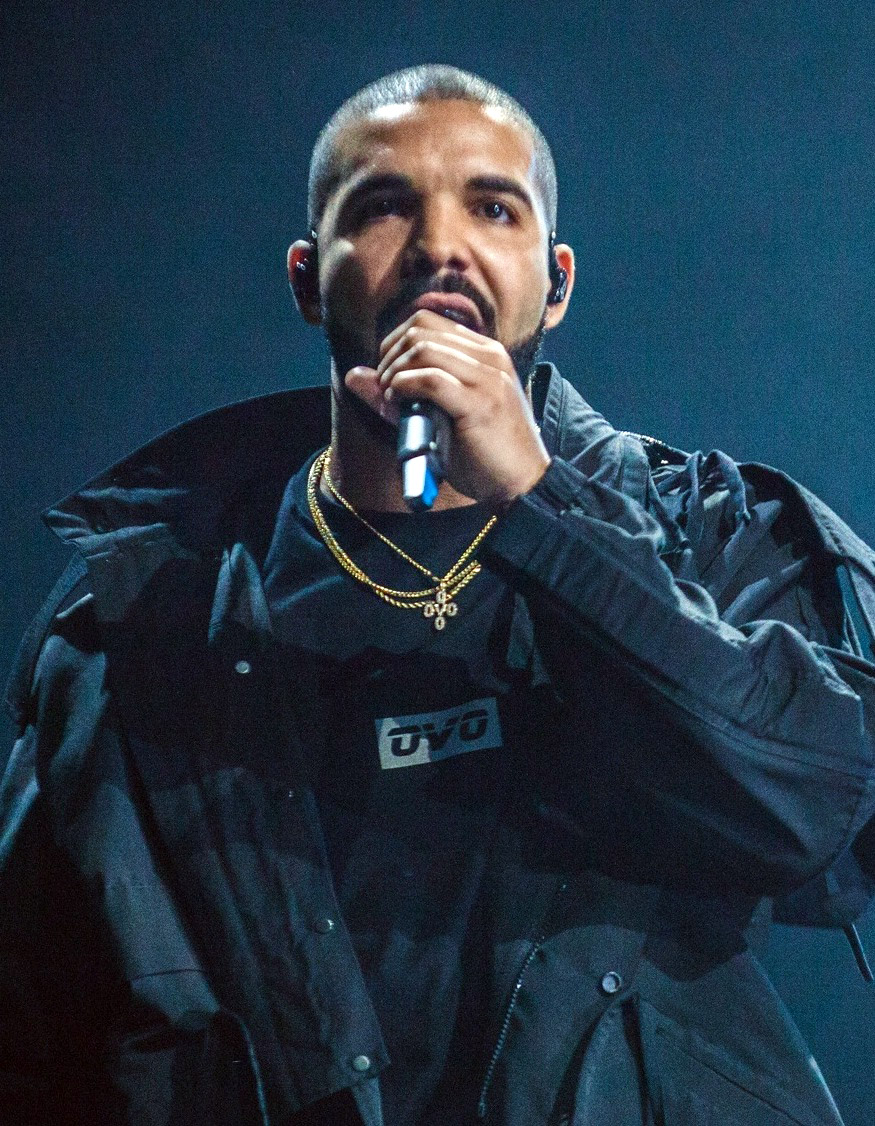
Drake

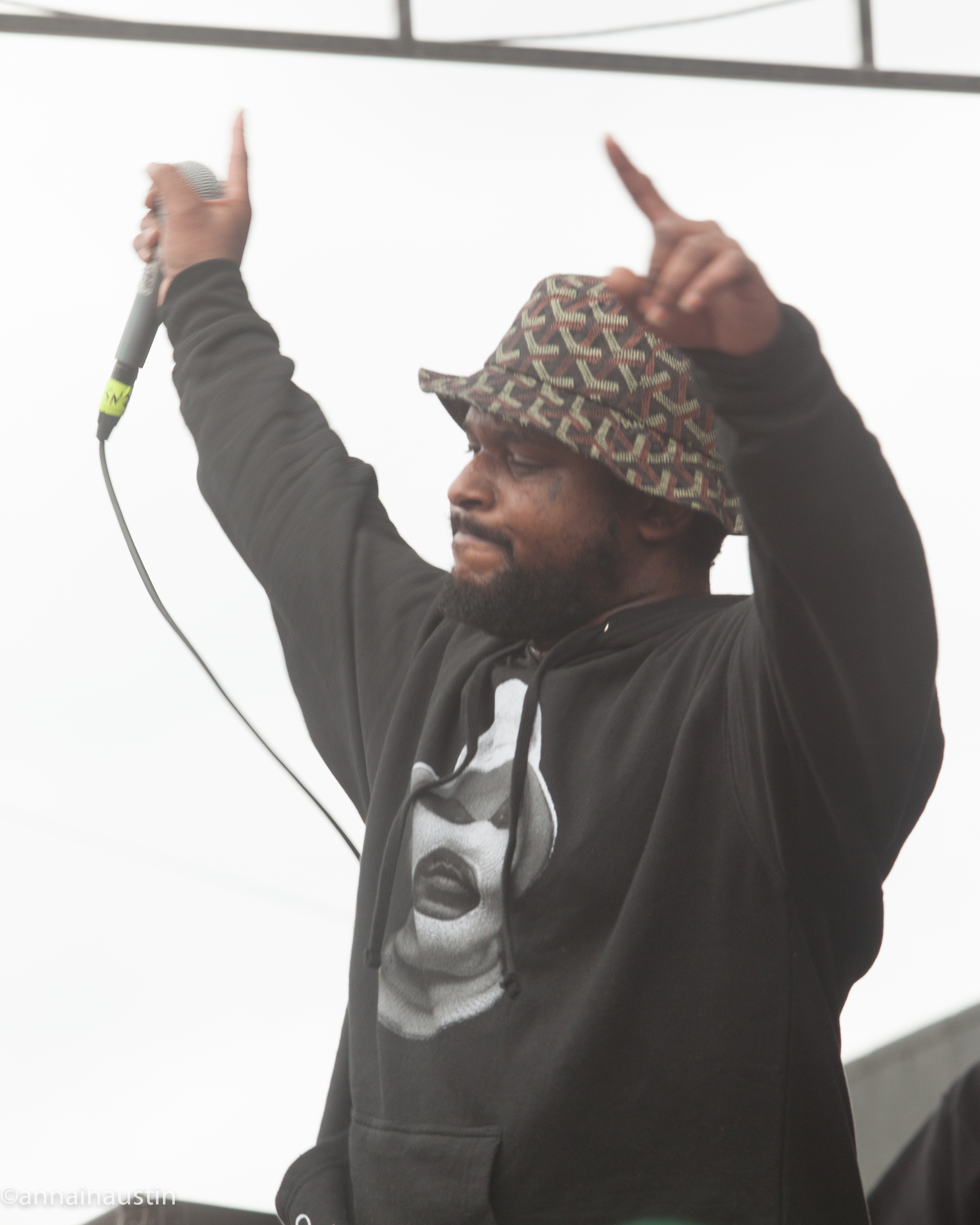
Schoolboy Q

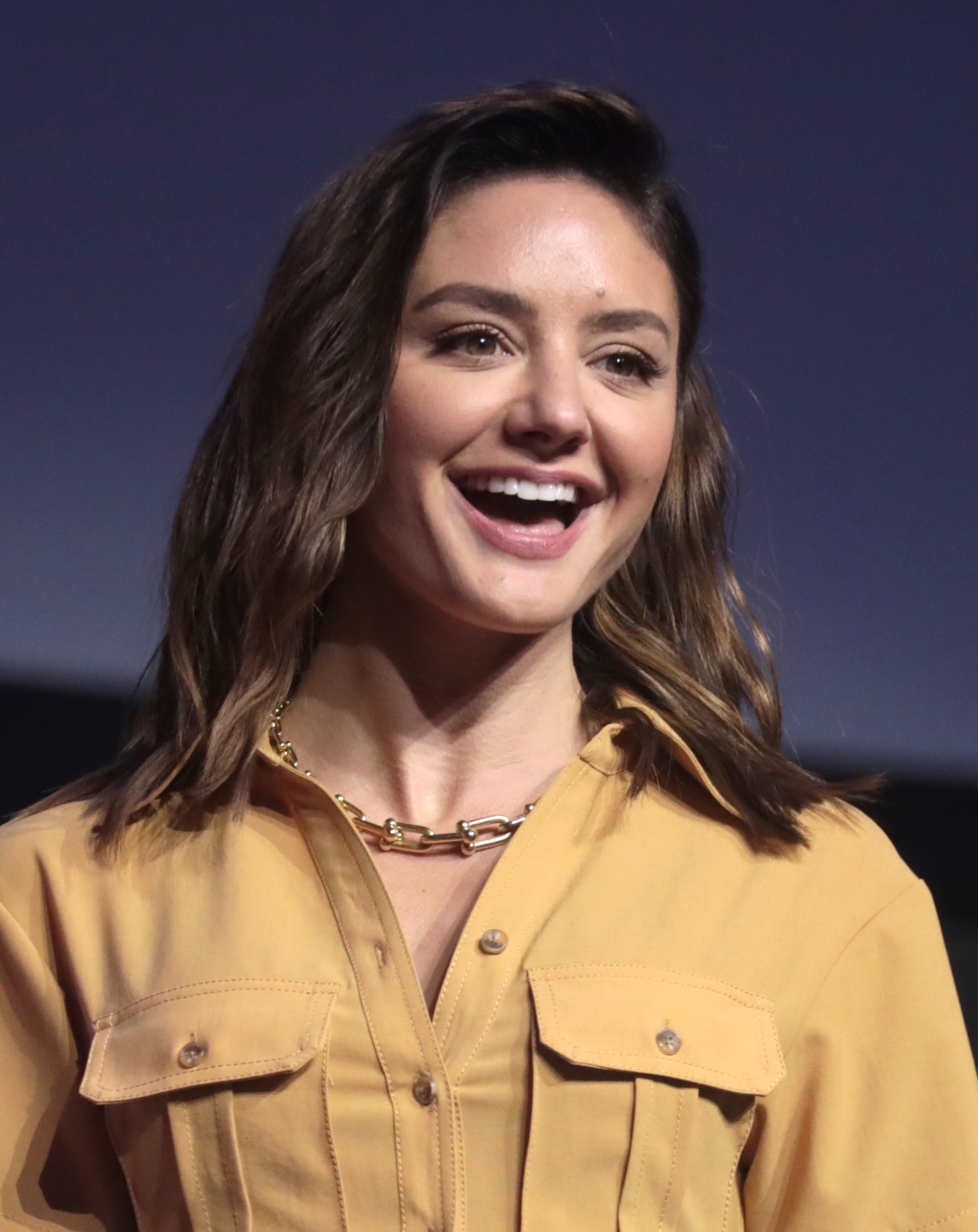
Christine Evangelista

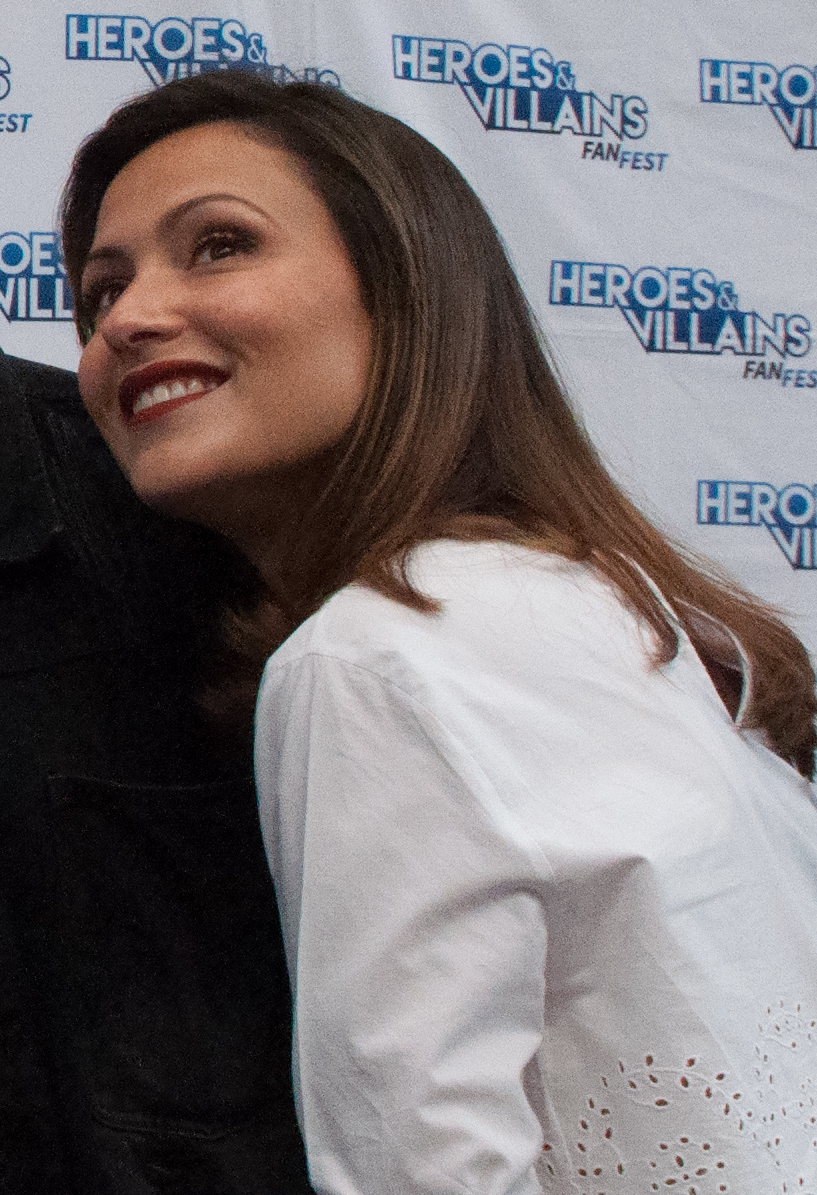
Italia Ricci

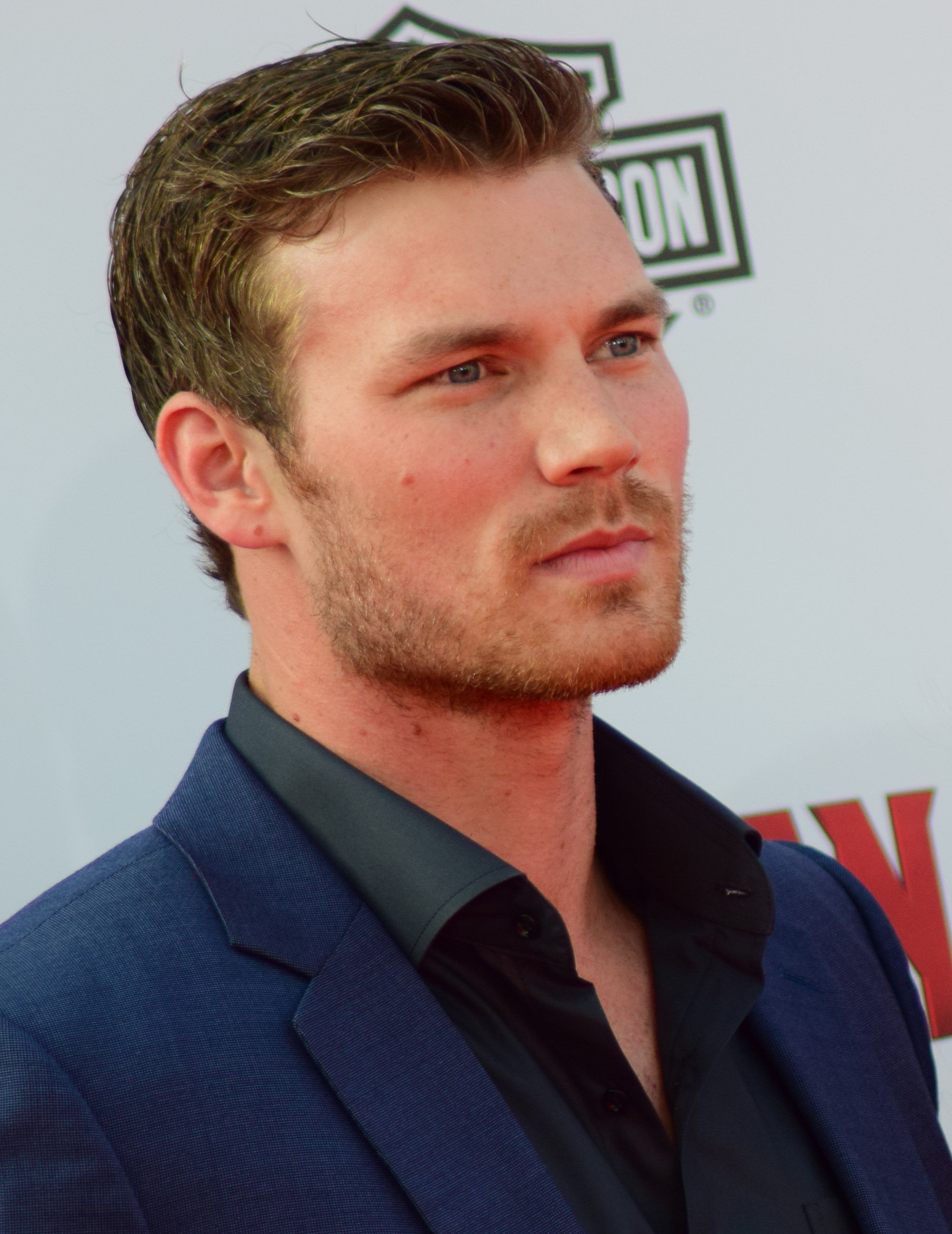
Derek Theler

- October 1
  - Jon Cooper, football player
  - Jurnee Smollett, actress
- October 2
  - Camilla Belle, actress
  - Stu Bickel, hockey player
- October 3
  - Kyle Brotzman, football player
  - Heidi Feek, singer/songwriter
  - Melanie Fontana, singer/songwriter and composer
- October 4
  - Stephen Fife, baseball player
  - Lauren Underwood, politician
- October 5
  - Jeff Bianchi, baseball player
  - Kevin Bigley, actor
  - Tanner Roark, baseball player
  - Joaquin Wilde, wrestler
- October 6 – Olivia Thirlby, actress
- October 7
  - Jairus Byrd, football player
  - Clara-Nova, electronic indie pop musician
  - Kaitlyn, wrestler and model
  - Andy Lewis, slackliner (d. 2026)
  - Bret Lockett, football player
  - Bree Olson, pornographic actress
  - Holland Roden, actress
  - Amber Stevens West, actress and model
- October 8
  - Will Brooks, mixed martial artist
  - Terrill Byrd, football player
  - Edgar Castillo, soccer player
  - Adron Chambers, baseball player
  - Steven Curfman, soccer player
- October 9 – Chaz Roe, baseball player
- October 10
  - Andrew McCutchen, baseball player
  - Cedric Peerman, football player
  - Rachel Yurkovich, Olympic javelin thrower
- October 11 – Jamar Chaney, football player
- October 12
  - Jackie Bates, football player
  - Trevor Bell, baseball player
  - Tyler Blackburn, actor, singer and model
  - Marcus T. Paulk, actor, rapper and dancer
- October 13
  - John Albert, mixed martial artist
  - Isabella Boylston, ballerina
  - Tim Burke, golfer
  - Raquel Lee, actress
  - Julia McIlvaine, actress
- October 14
  - Wesley Matthews, basketball player
  - Skyler Shaye, actress
- October 15
  - Kentwan Balmer, football player
  - Connor Barwin, football player
  - Sarah Brown, middle-distance runner
  - Emily Cross, Olympic foil fencer
  - Paul Walter Hauser, actor
- October 16
  - A. J. Abrams, basketball player
  - Augusto Aguilera, Ecuadorian-born actor
  - Jordan Larson, volleyball player
- October 17
  - David Bakes Baker, poker player
  - Dan Butler, baseball player
  - Michael Byrne, football player
  - Josh Cameron, soccer player
  - Chris Motionless, singer and frontman for Motionless in White
- October 18 – Josh Romanski, baseball player
- October 19
  - London Crawford, football player
  - Moses Stone, hip-hop artist, music producer, entrepreneur, and actor
- October 20 – Ryan Bedford, Olympic speed skater
- October 21
  - Natalee Holloway, young female who went missing in Aruba in 2005
  - Sean McInerney, surfer and stunt performer
  - Riley Skinner, football player
  - Tamerlan Tsarnaev, Russian-born terrorist (d. 2013)
- October 22
  - Mike Blumel, speed skater
  - Chancellor, South Korean-born musician
  - Kyle Gallner, actor
- October 23
  - Mark Cardenas, politician
  - Briana Evigan, actress and dancer
  - LoLa Monroe, rapper, model, and actress
  - Jessica Stroup, actress
- October 24
  - Brayden Coombs, football coach
  - Drake, Canadian-American actor and rapper
- October 25
  - Antwon, rapper
  - Didi Benami, singer and American Idol contestant
  - Tweety Carter, basketball player
  - Hannah Cohen, singer and model
  - Kyle Moore, football player
  - Eloy Pérez, boxer (d. 2019)
- October 26
  - Robert Carroll, politician
  - Annabelle Dexter-Jones, British-born actress
  - Schoolboy Q, rapper
- October 27
  - Jimmy Bartolotta, basketball player
  - Boyd Brown, politician
  - Chris Butler, ice hockey player
  - Casanova, rapper
  - Erica Dasher, actress
  - Christine Evangelista, actress
  - Crystal Langhorne, basketball player
  - Monte Money, singer, guitarist for Escape the Fate (2004–2013), and frontman for Beyond Unbroken
- October 28
  - Helena Andrews, author, journalist, and pop culture critic
  - Dorrough, rapper
  - Tamar Kaprelian, musician and singer
  - Alex Zayne, wrestler
- October 29
  - Ciron Black, football player
  - Italia Ricci, Canadian-born actress
  - Derek Theler, actor
- October 31
  - Jim Cummings, actor and filmmaker
  - Lee Fang, journalist
  - Sean Paul Lockhart, porn actor and director

=== November ===
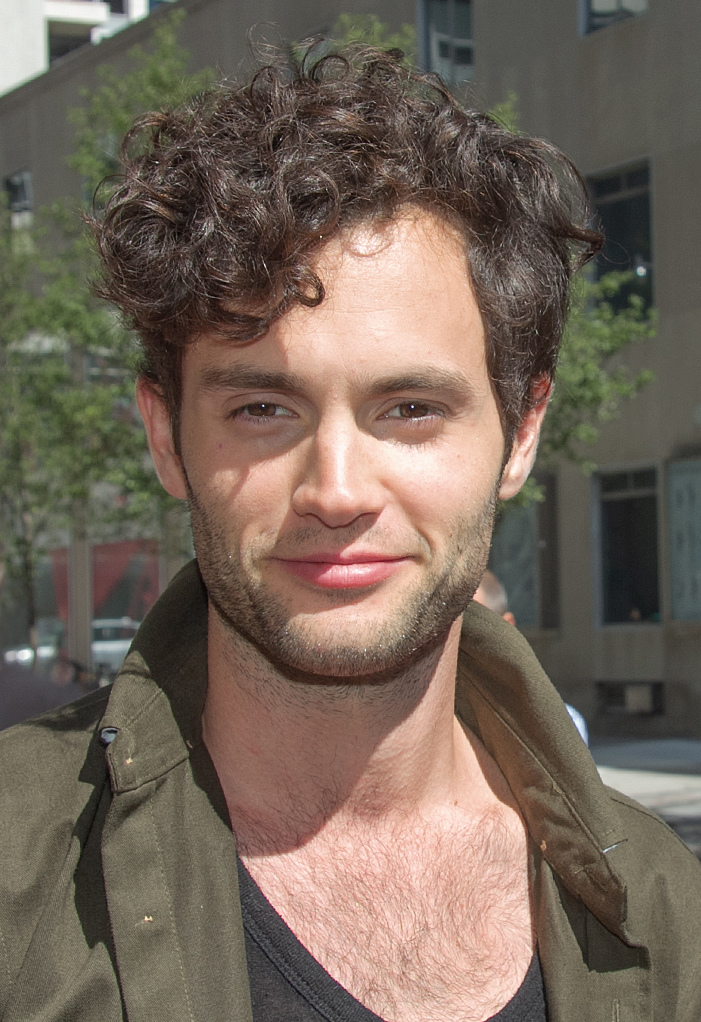
Penn Badgley

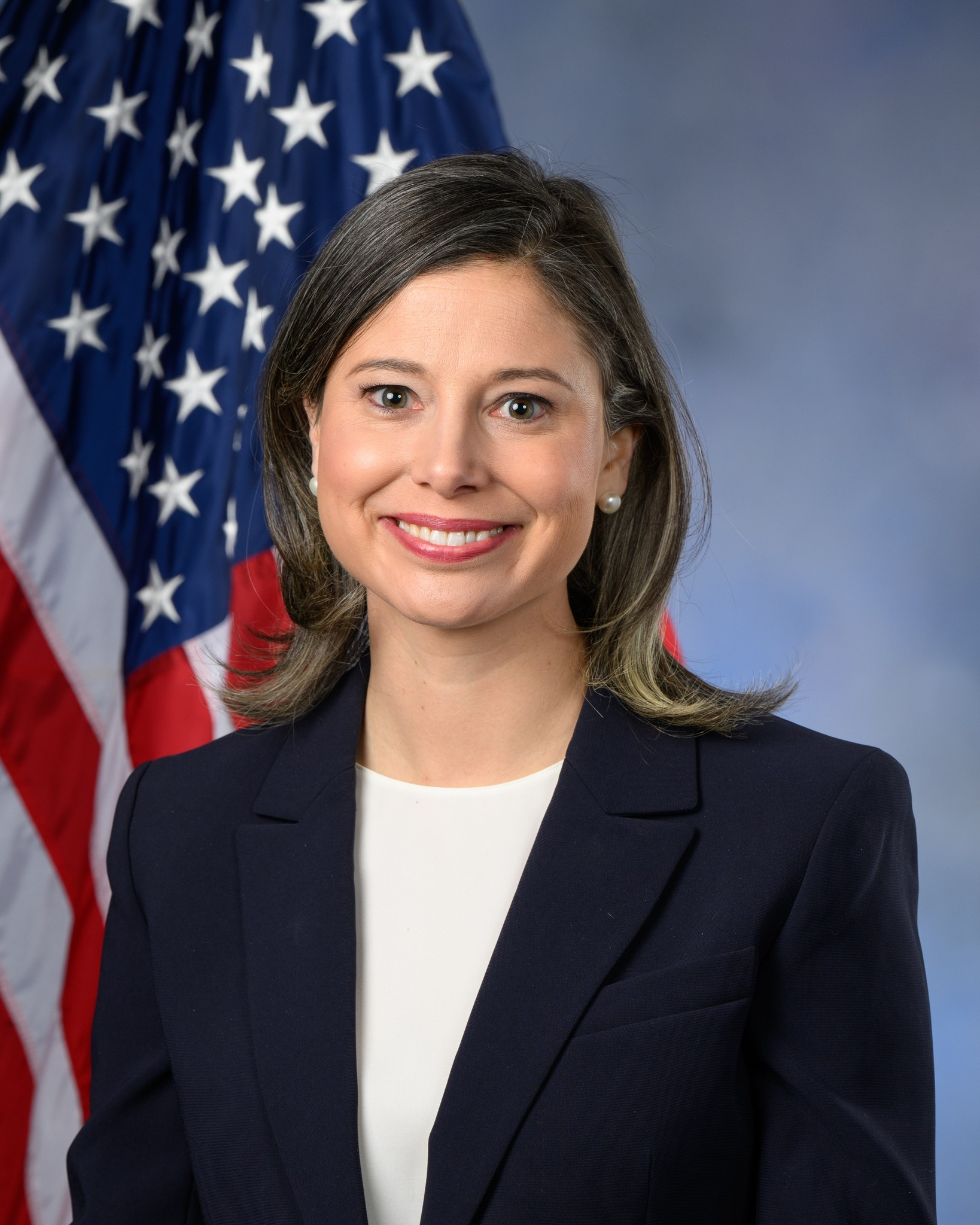
Maggie Goodlander

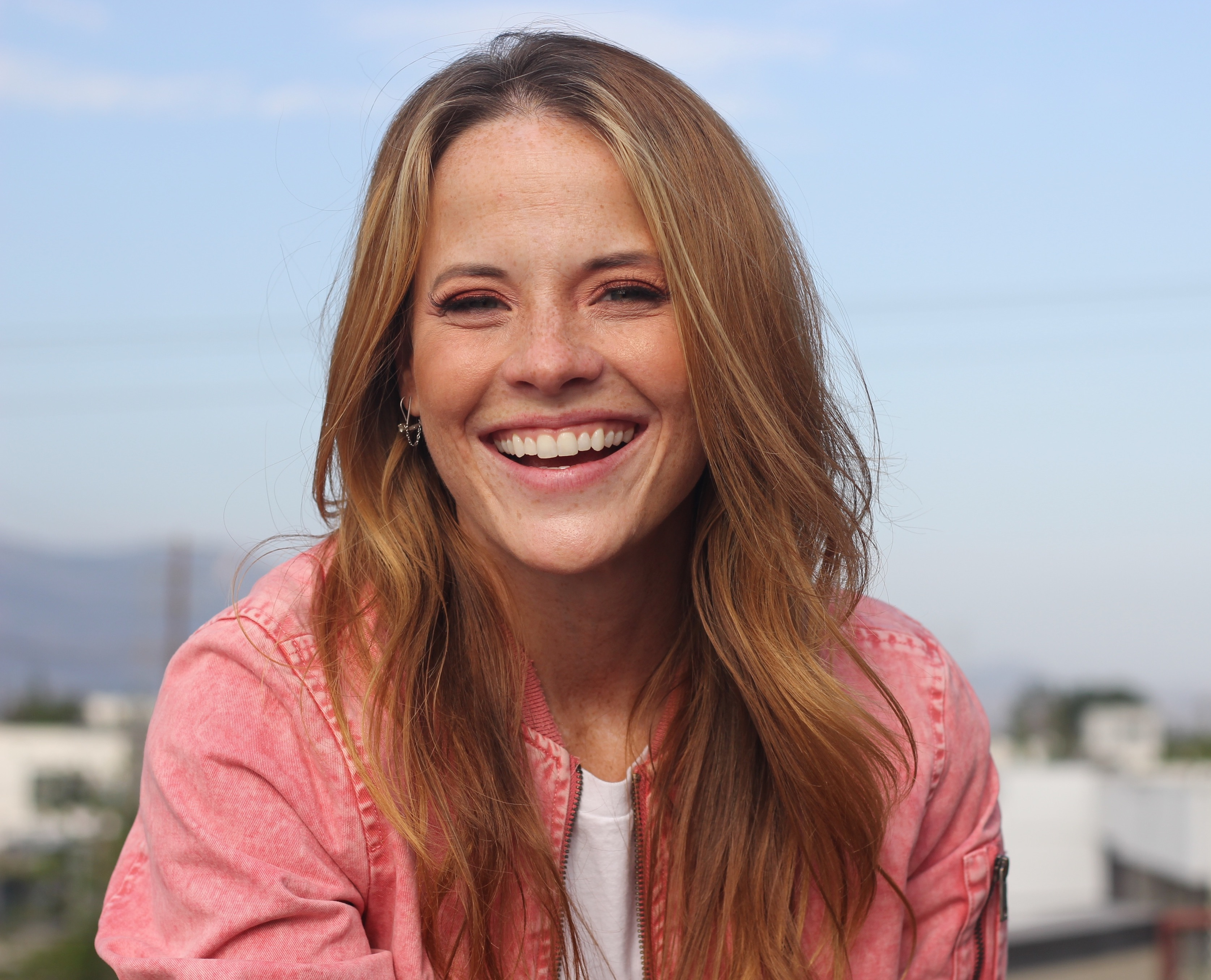
Katie Leclerc

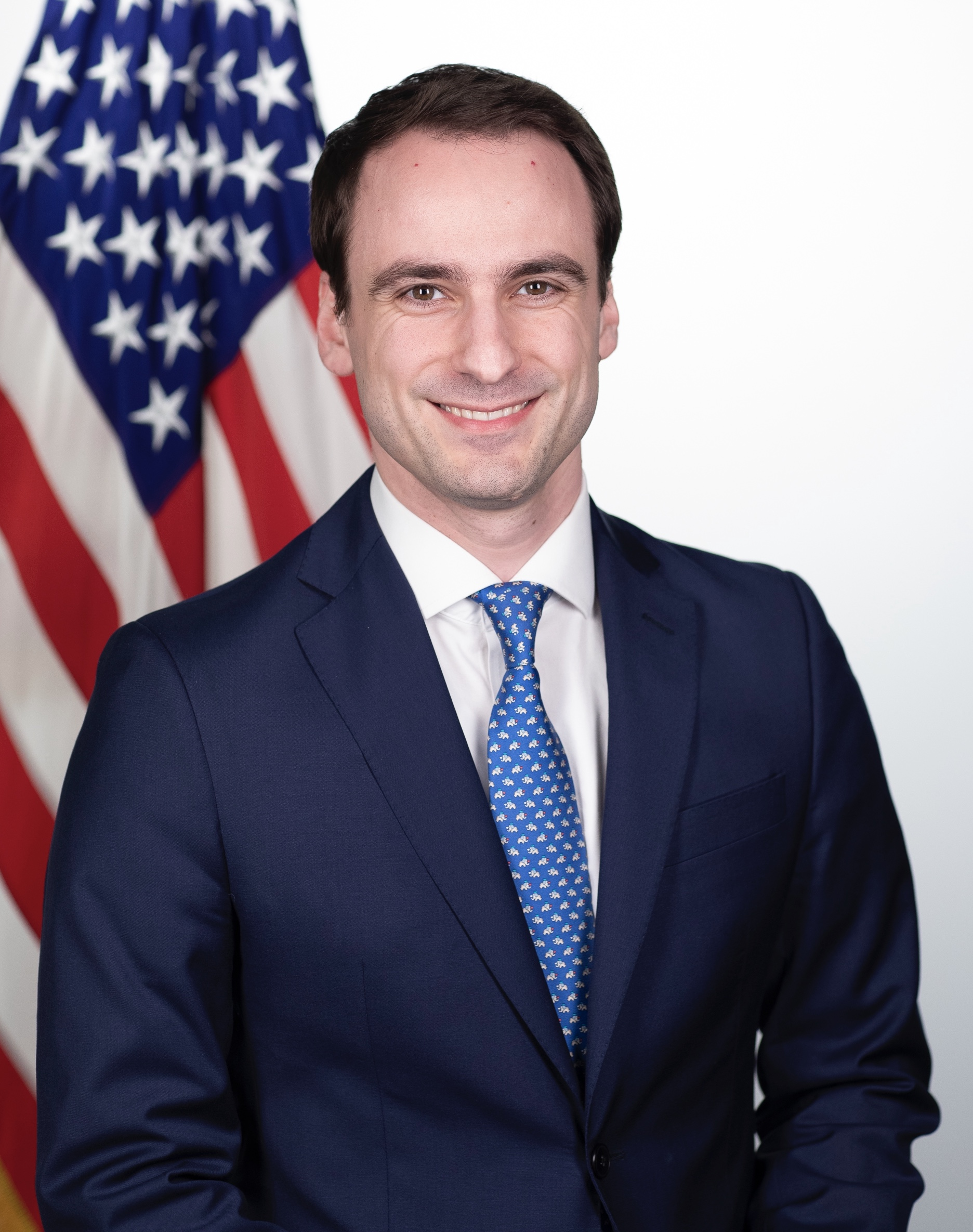
Michael Kratsios

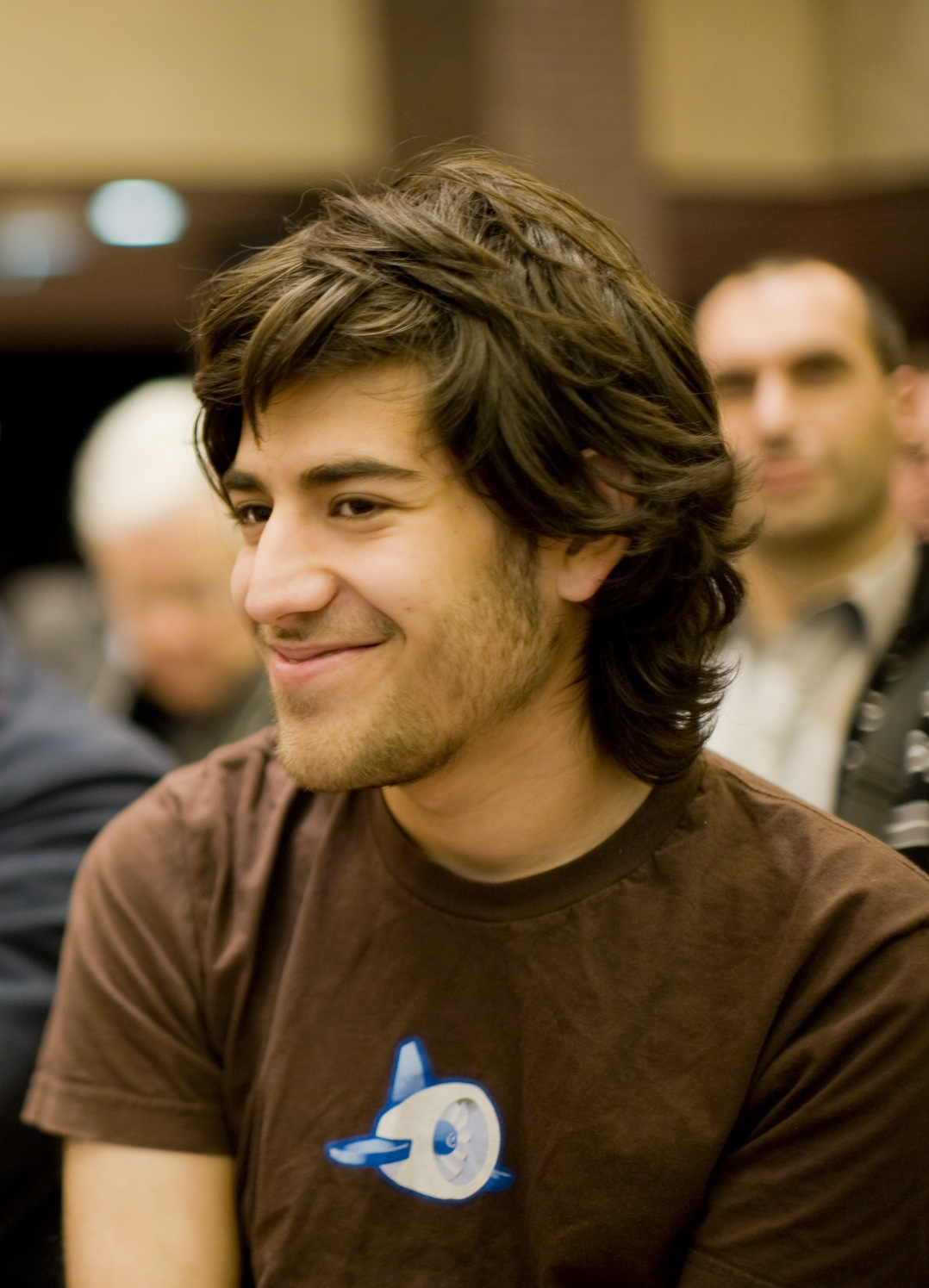
Aaron Swartz

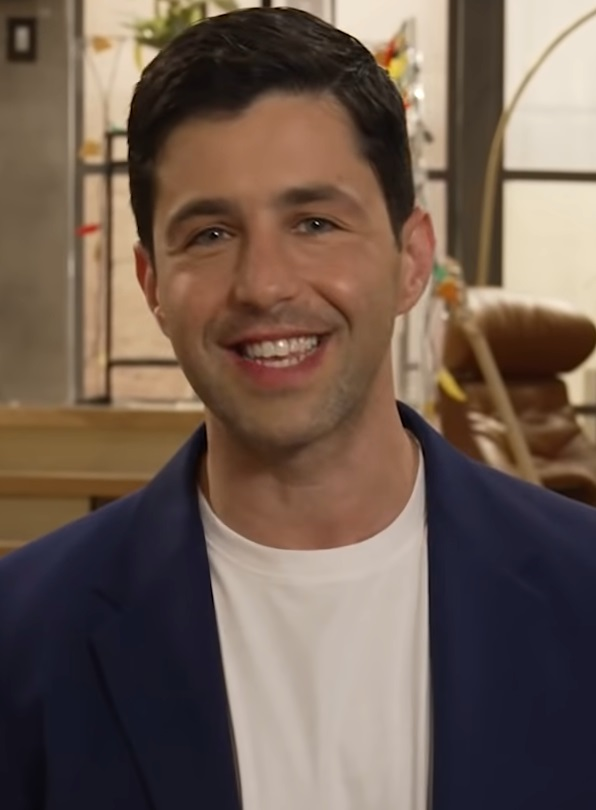
Josh Peck

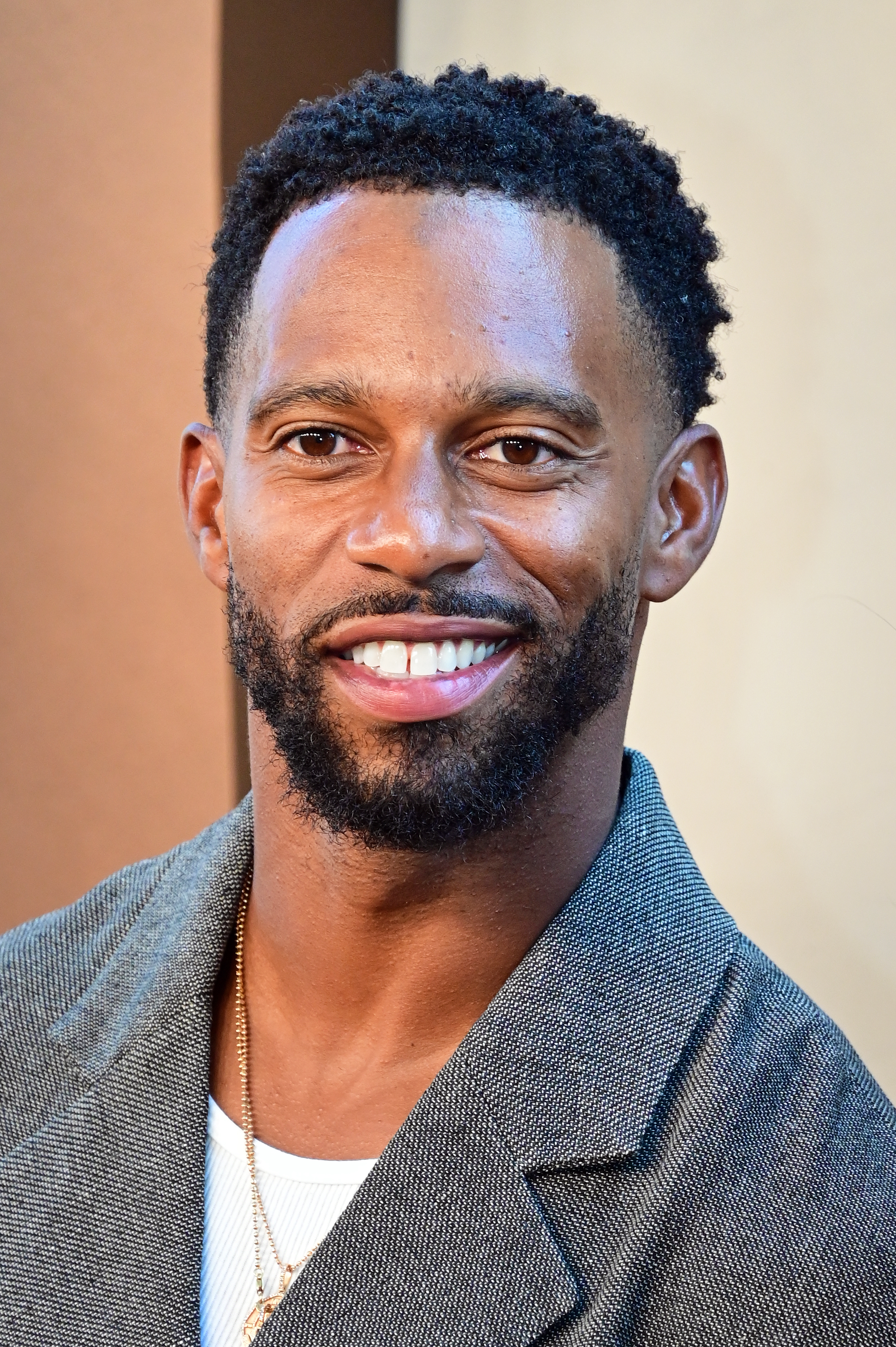
Victor Cruz

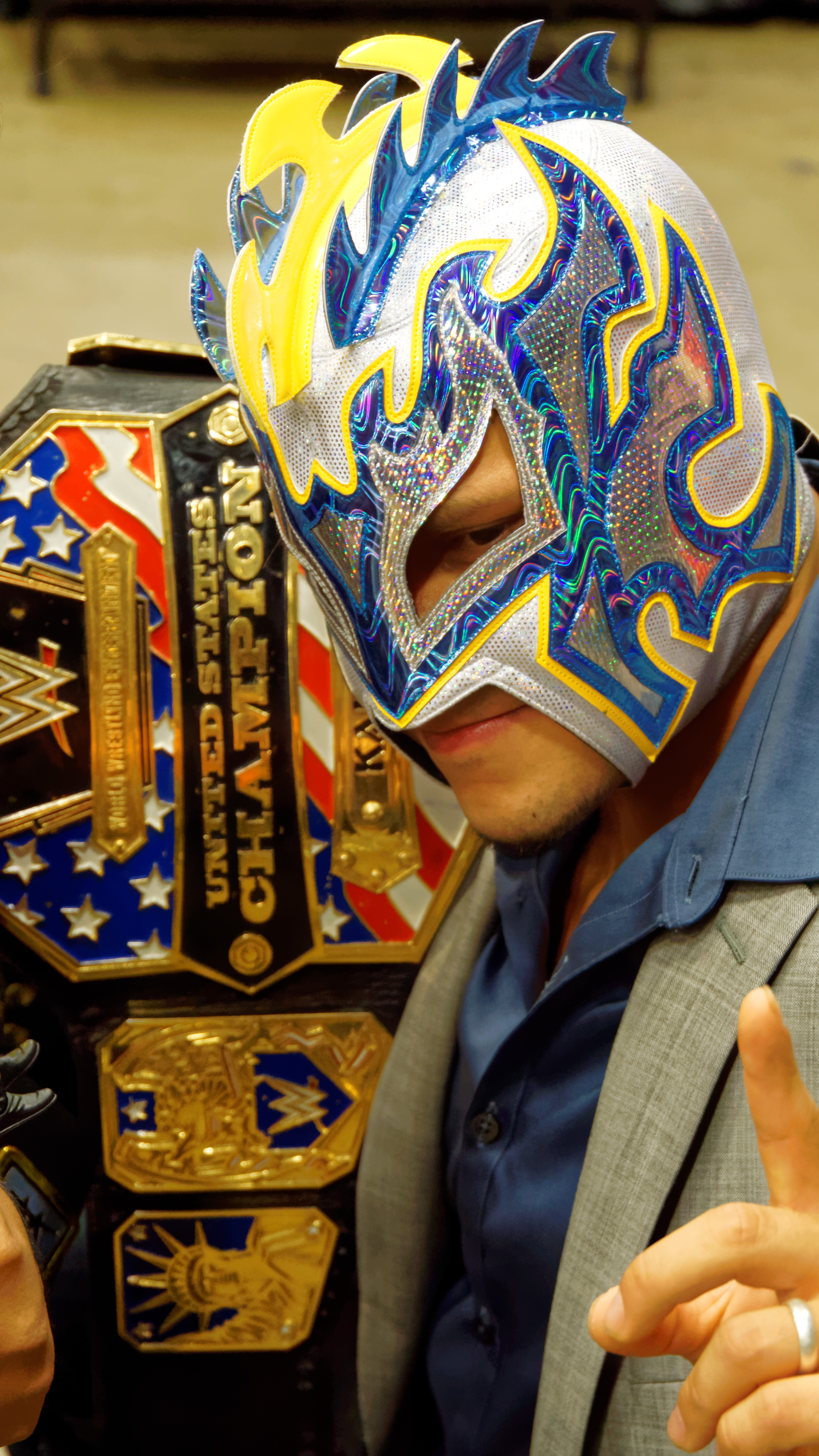
Kalisto

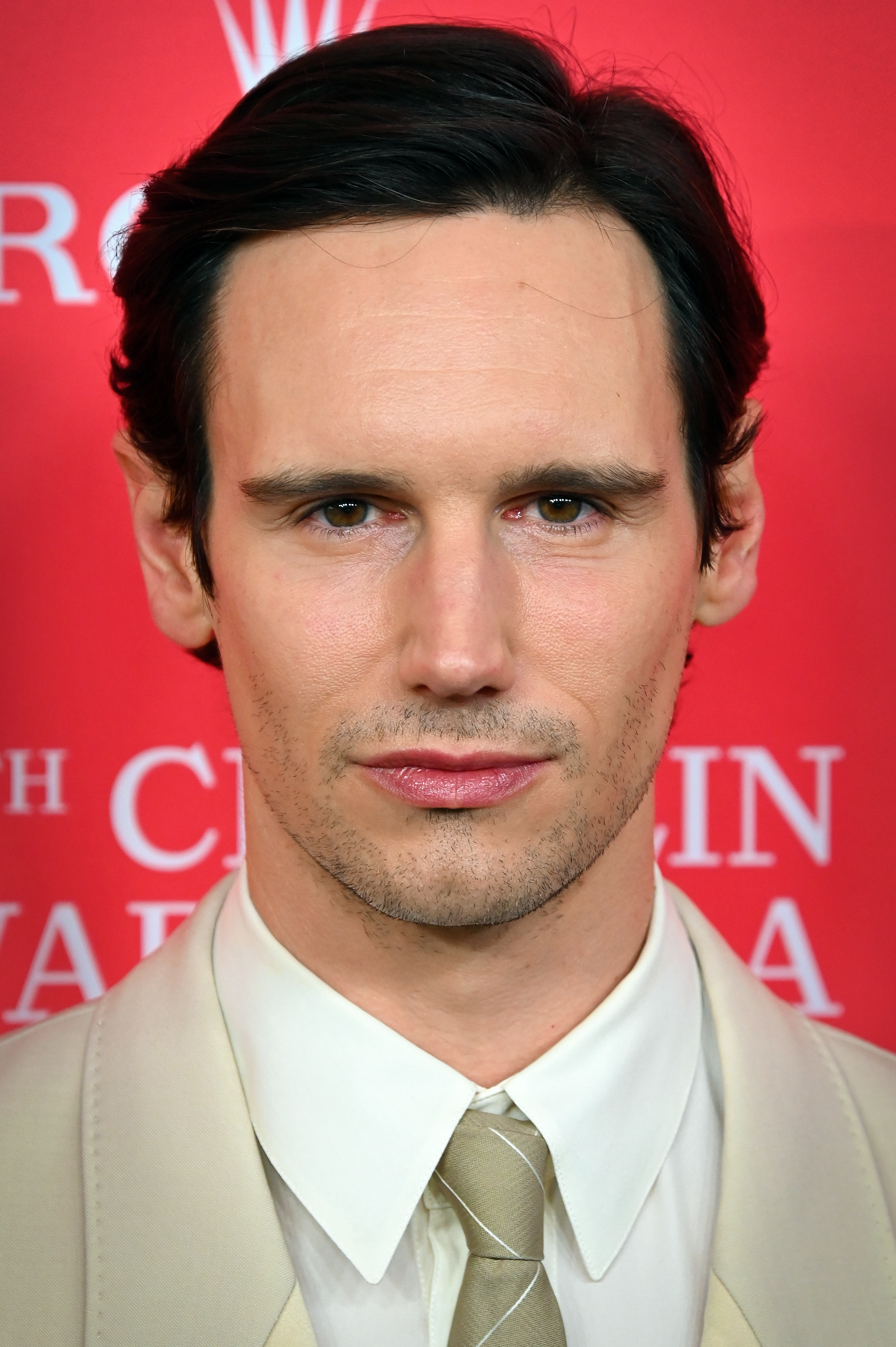
Cory Michael Smith

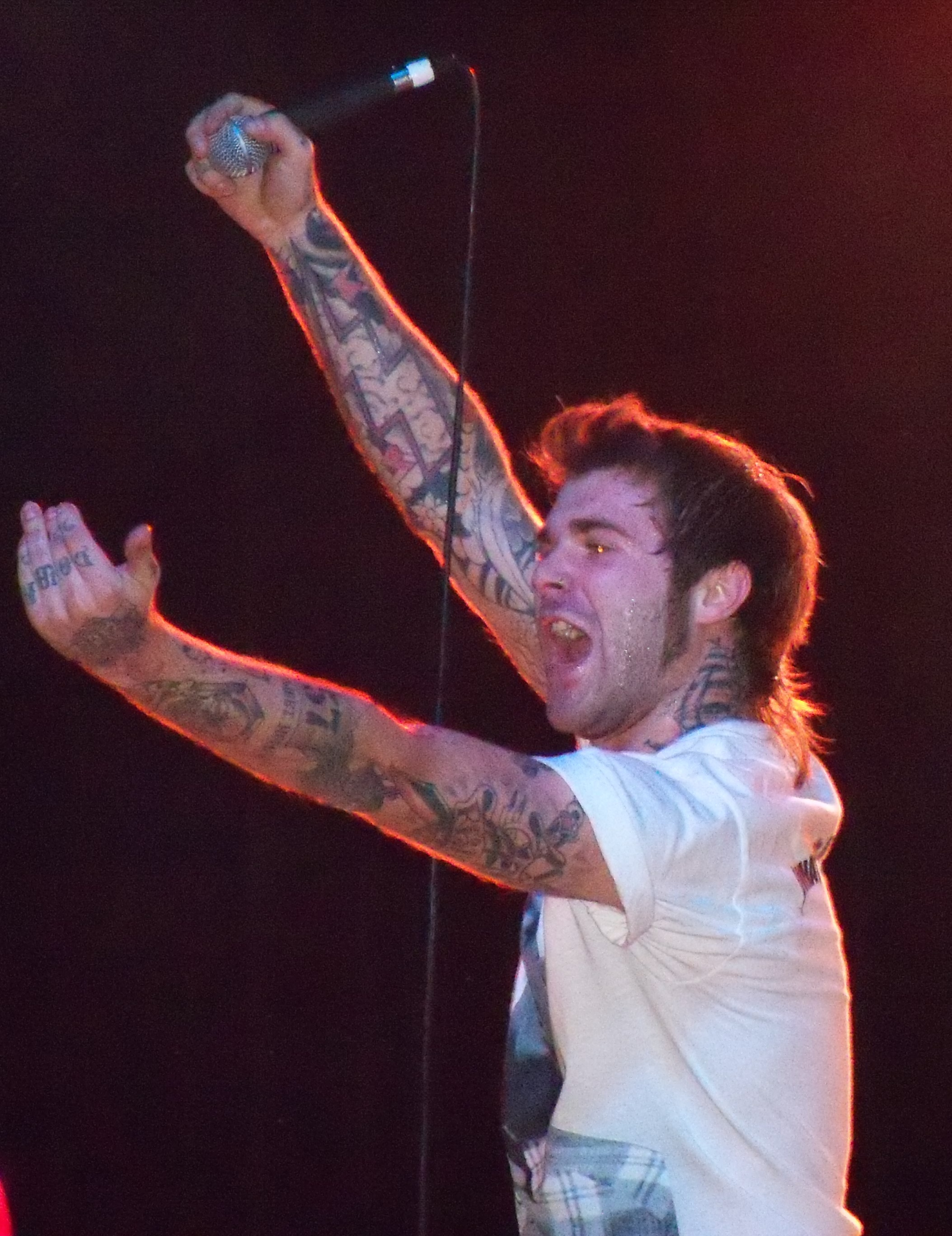
Jerry Roush

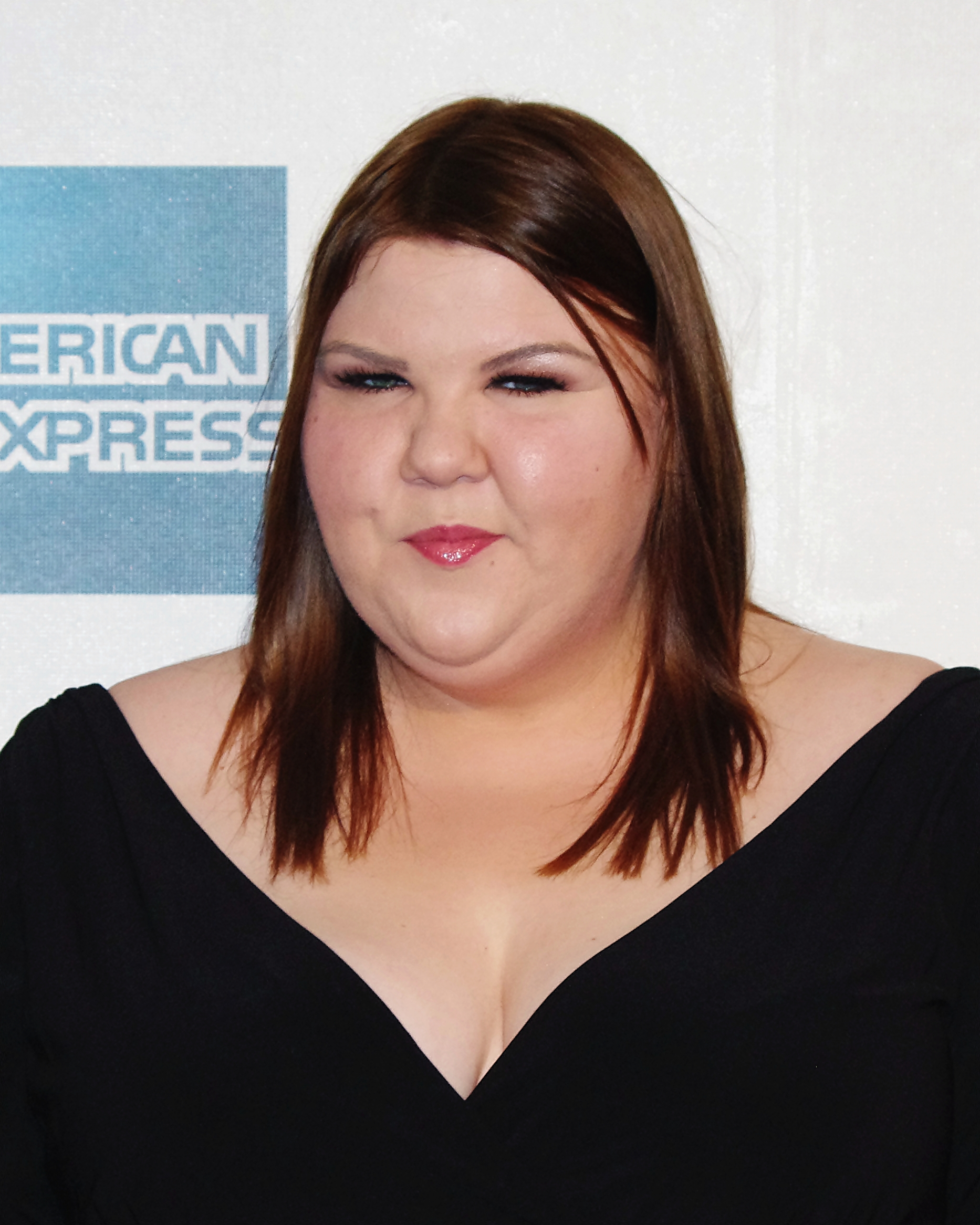
Ashley Fink

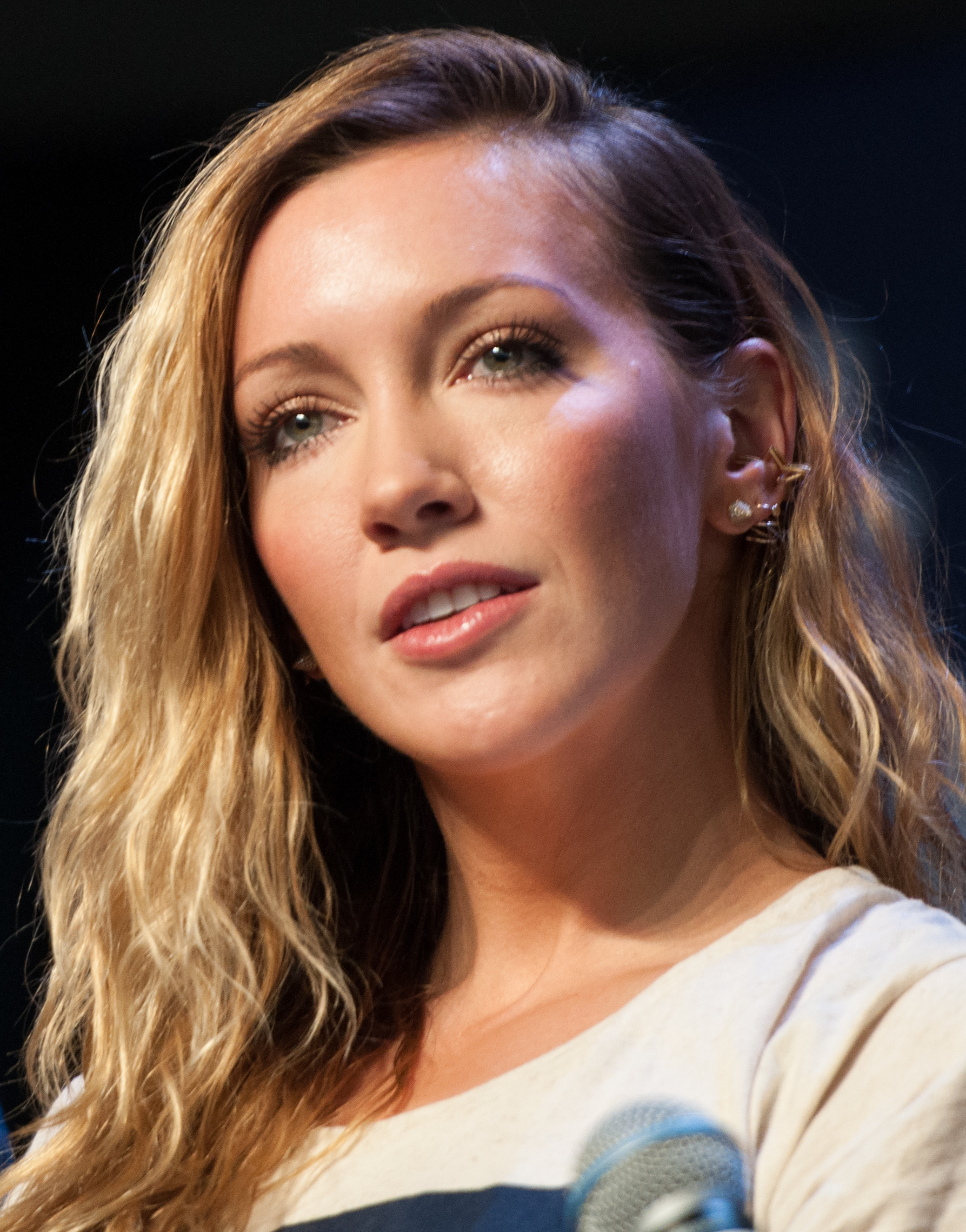
Katie Cassidy

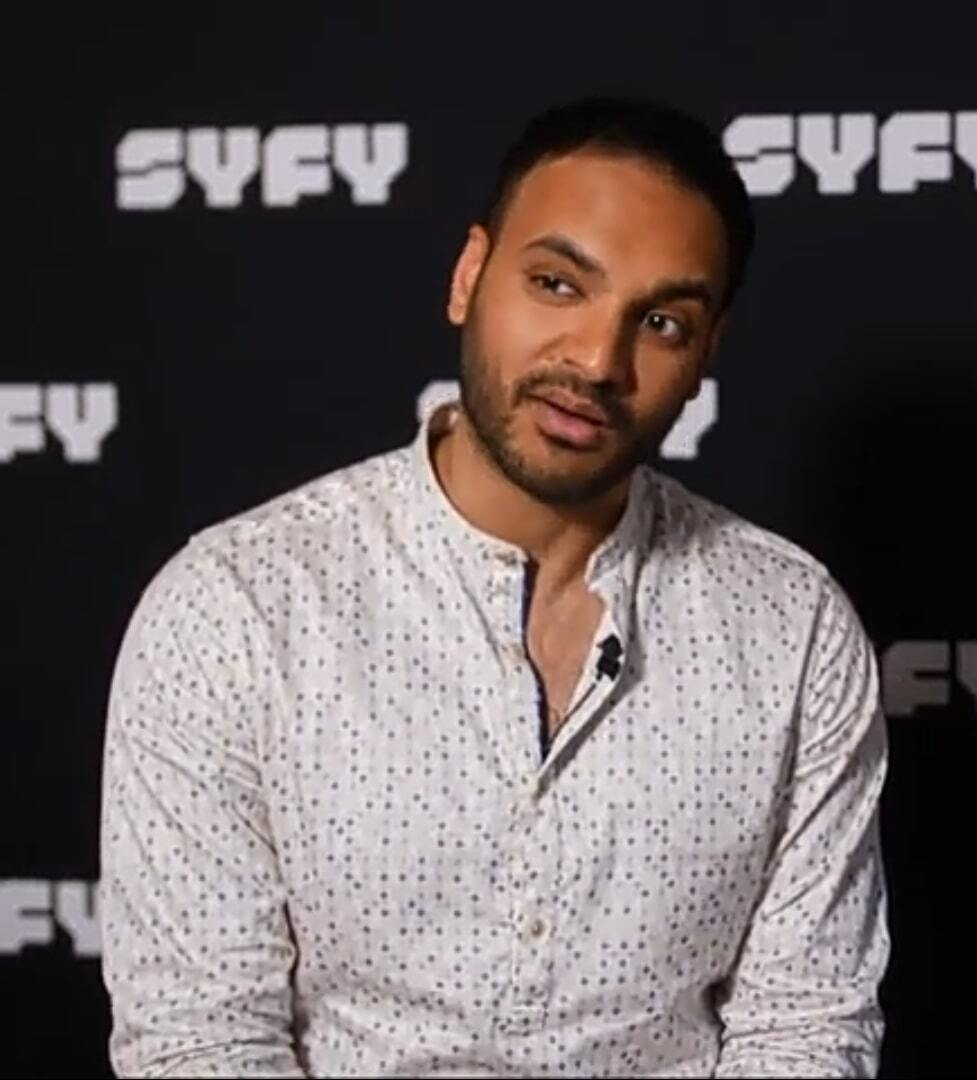
Arjun Gupta

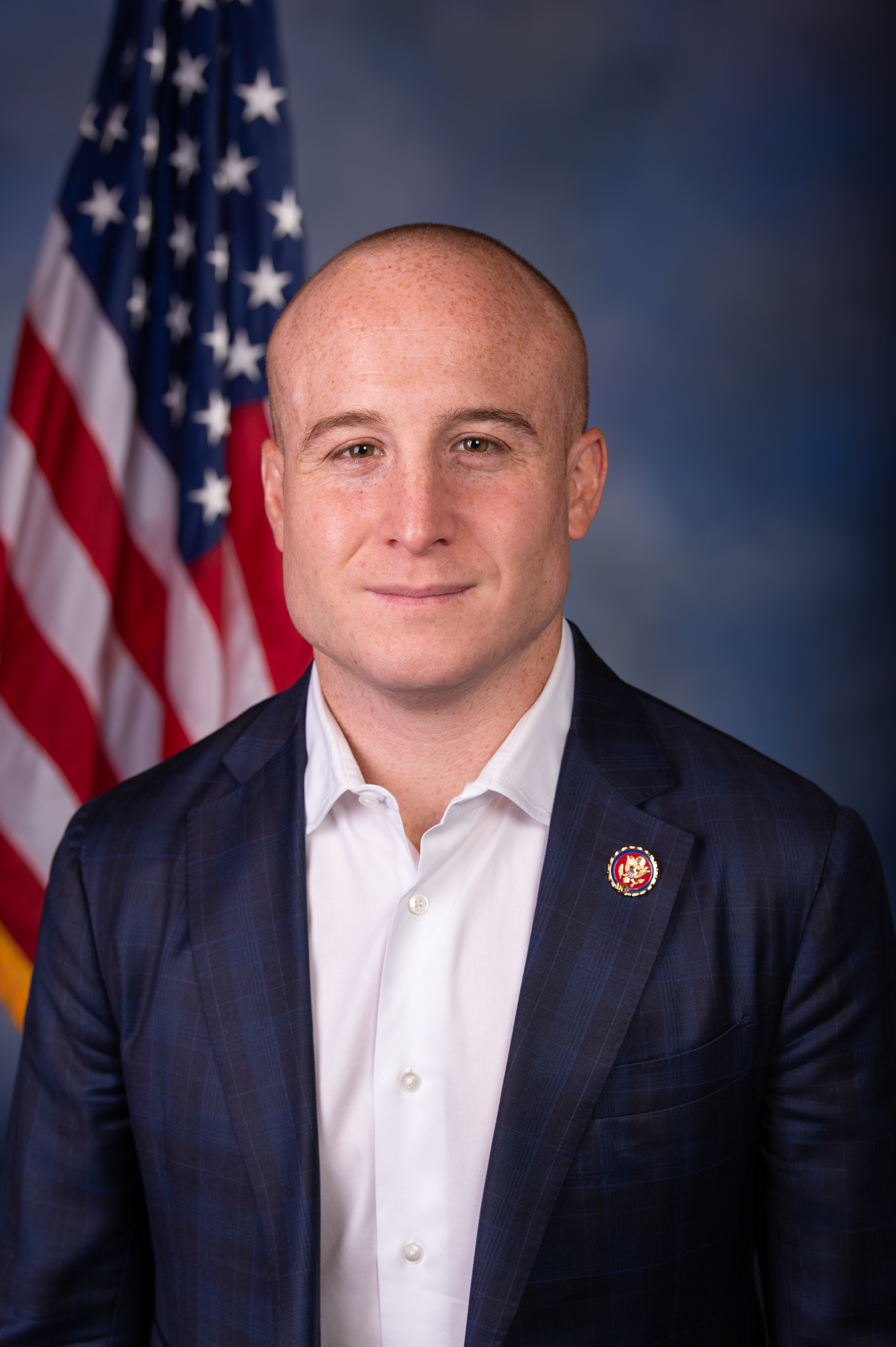
Max Rose

- November 1
  - Yamiche Alcindor, journalist
  - Penn Badgley, actor
  - Michelle Sechser, Olympic rower
- November 2
  - Brandon Barklage, soccer player
  - Yurizan Beltran, pornographic actress, model, and mainstream actress (d. 2017)
  - Hannah Hart, YouTuber
  - Jade Jolie, drag queen and TV personality
- November 3
  - Bethany Cosentino, singer and songwriter
  - Yael Averbuch West, soccer player
  - Davon Jefferson, basketball player
  - Jermaine Jones, singer
  - Jasmine Trias, singer
- November 4
  - Amanda Blumenherst, golfer
  - Kristin Cast, author
  - Maggie Goodlander, politician
- November 5 – Cavalier Johnson, politician, mayor of Milwaukee, Wisconsin (2021–present)
- November 6
  - James Ferraro, experimental musician, producer, composer and contemporary artist
  - Katie Leclerc, actress
  - Miguel Mena, Peruvian-born jockey (d. 2021)
  - Ben Rector, singer/songwriter and record producer
- November 7
  - Caleb Bonham, businessman and TV personality
  - Amanda Busick, sports reporter
  - James Ferraro, musician and contemporary artist
  - Andy Hull, singer and frontman for Manchester Orchestra
  - Michael Kratsios, business executive
  - Patrick Trahan, football player
- November 8
  - Kevin Bivona, musician and audio engineer
  - Ryan Colburn, football player
  - Ilya Serov, Russian-born trumpeter and singer
  - Aaron Swartz, computer programmer, internet activist, and co-founder of Reddit (d. 2013)
- November 9
  - Cody Brown, football player
  - Kali Fajardo-Anstine, novelist and writer
- November 10
  - Chase Coffman, football player
  - Aaron Crow, baseball player
  - Andy Mientus, actor, singer, composer, and writer
  - Josh Peck, actor, voice actor, comedian
  - Eric Thames, baseball player
- November 11
  - Jon Batiste, musician and TV personality
  - Victor Cruz, football player
  - Anthony Purpura, rugby player
  - Mark Sanchez, football player
- November 12 – Sean Canfield, football player
- November 13
  - Josh Bell, baseball player
  - Selvish Capers, football player
  - Evan Strong, Paralympic snowboard cross racer
- November 14
  - Thomas Austin, football player and coach
  - Michael Bihovsky, actor and composer
  - Matthew Bogusz, politician
  - Courtney Enders, drag racer
  - Kalisto, wrestler and luchador
  - Cory Michael Smith, actor
  - Sophie von Haselberg, actress
- November 15
  - Winston Duke, Trinbagonian-born actor
  - Coye Francies, football player
  - Matthew Patrick, YouTuber
  - Jerry Roush, singer/songwriter and frontman for Sky Eats Airplane (2006–2009), Of Mice & Men (2010–2011), and Glass Cloud
  - Devin Thomas, football player
  - Jason Trost, actor and filmmaker
- November 16 – Omar Mateen, Islamic terrorist, mass murderer and perpetrator of the Orlando nightclub shooting
- November 17
  - Christina Birch, cyclist
  - Erik Lorig, football player
- November 18 – Joseph Ashton, actor
- November 19
  - Zane Beadles, football player
  - Erin Hamlin, Olympic luger
  - Veronica Scott, fashion designer
- November 20
  - Chris Camozzi, mixed martial artist
  - Josh Carter, basketball player
  - Ashley Fink, actress and singer
  - Jaina Lee Ortiz, actress and dancer
  - Djuan Trent, YouTuber and pageant winner
- November 21
  - Colleen Ballinger, Internet personality, YouTuber, and comedian
  - Alex Barnett, basketball player
  - Ben Bishop, hockey player
  - Kyle Bosworth, football player
- November 22 – Claire Lutz, kite surfer
- November 24
  - Dean Anna, baseball player
  - K. C. Asiodu, football player
  - Jimmy Graham, football player
  - Mohamed Massaquoi, football player
  - Kenny Phillips, football player
- November 25
  - Randy Blake, kickboxer
  - Katie Cassidy, actress
  - Cole Escola, comedian, actor, and singer
  - Jason Rae, politician
- November 26
  - Antonella Barba, singer
  - Trevor Morgan, actor
  - Lauren Nelson, beauty queen and pageant winner
- November 27
  - Joe Cox, football player and coach
  - Tiffany Pham, entrepreneur, model, TV personality, author, and founder and CEO of Mogul
- November 28
  - Arjun Gupta, actor
  - Trevor Hall, singer/songwriter and guitarist
  - Max Rose, politician
  - Johnny Simmons, actor
- November 29
  - Nick Barese, baseball player and coach
  - Jackie Barnes, goalball player
- November 30 – Jordan Farmar, basketball player

=== December ===
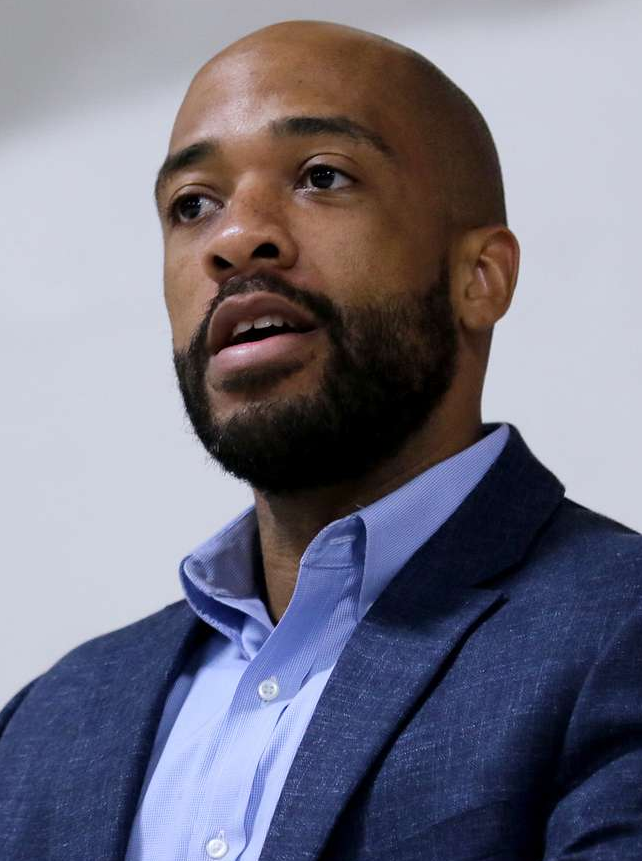
Mandela Barnes

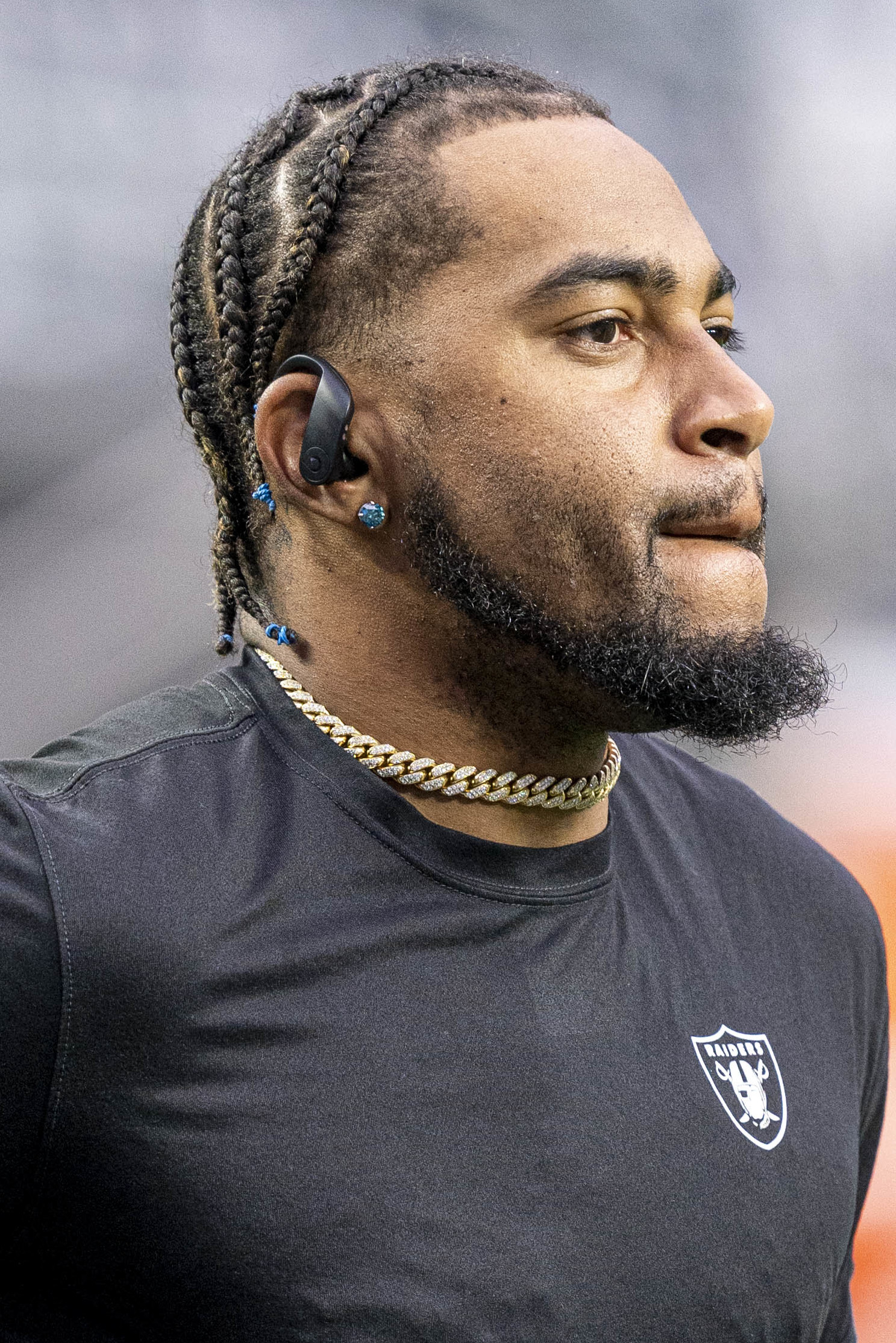
DeSean Jackson

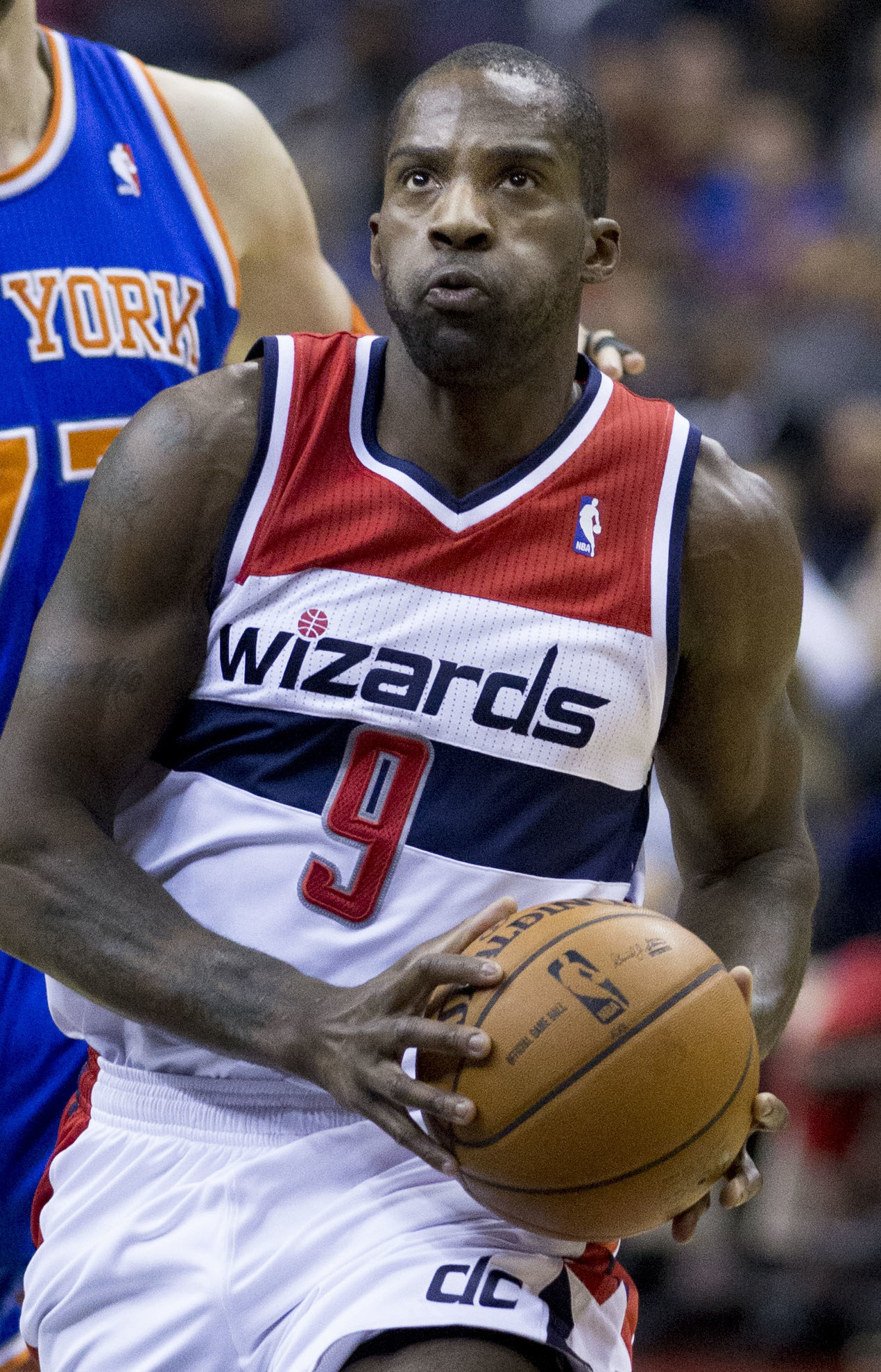
Martell Webster

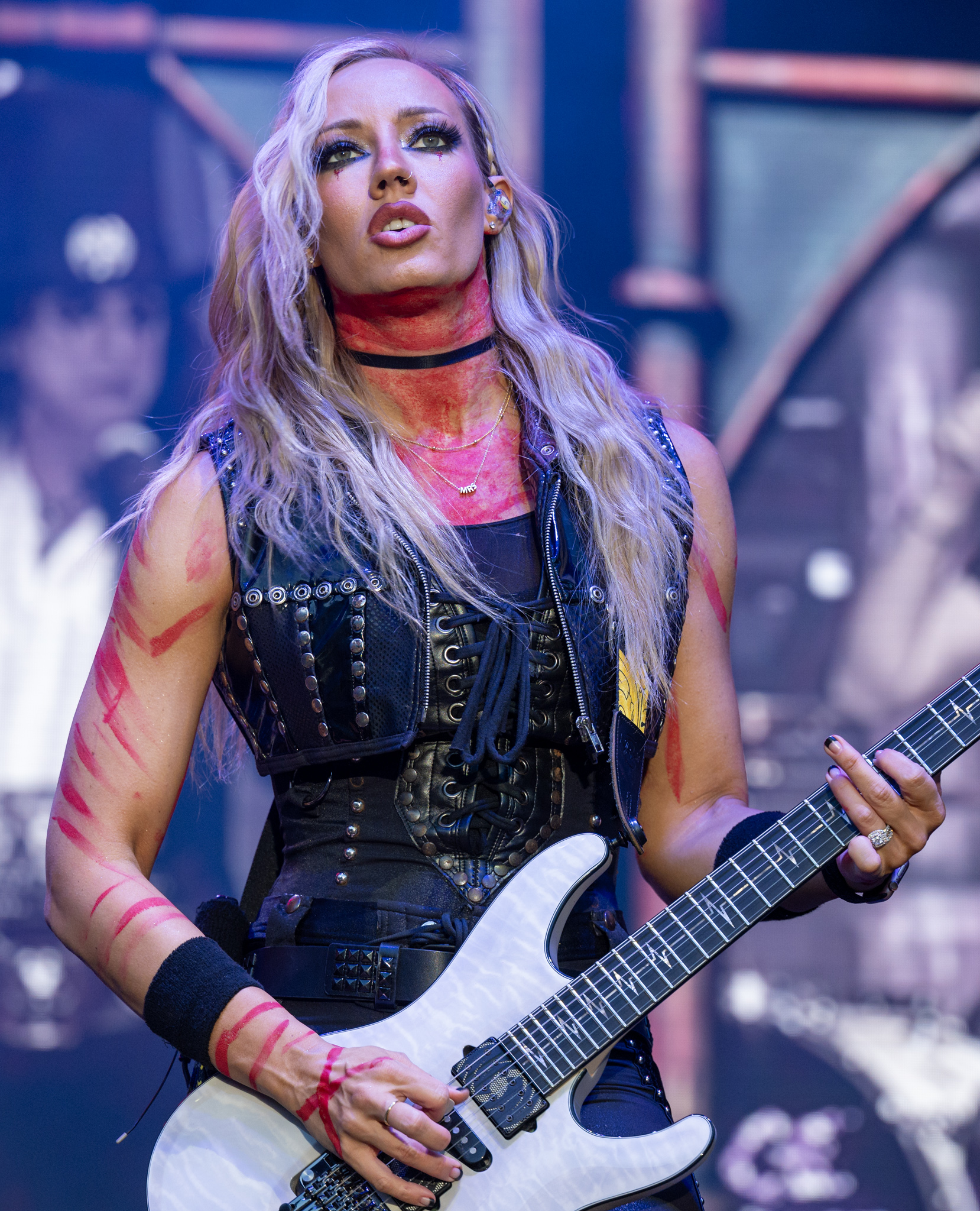
Nita Strauss

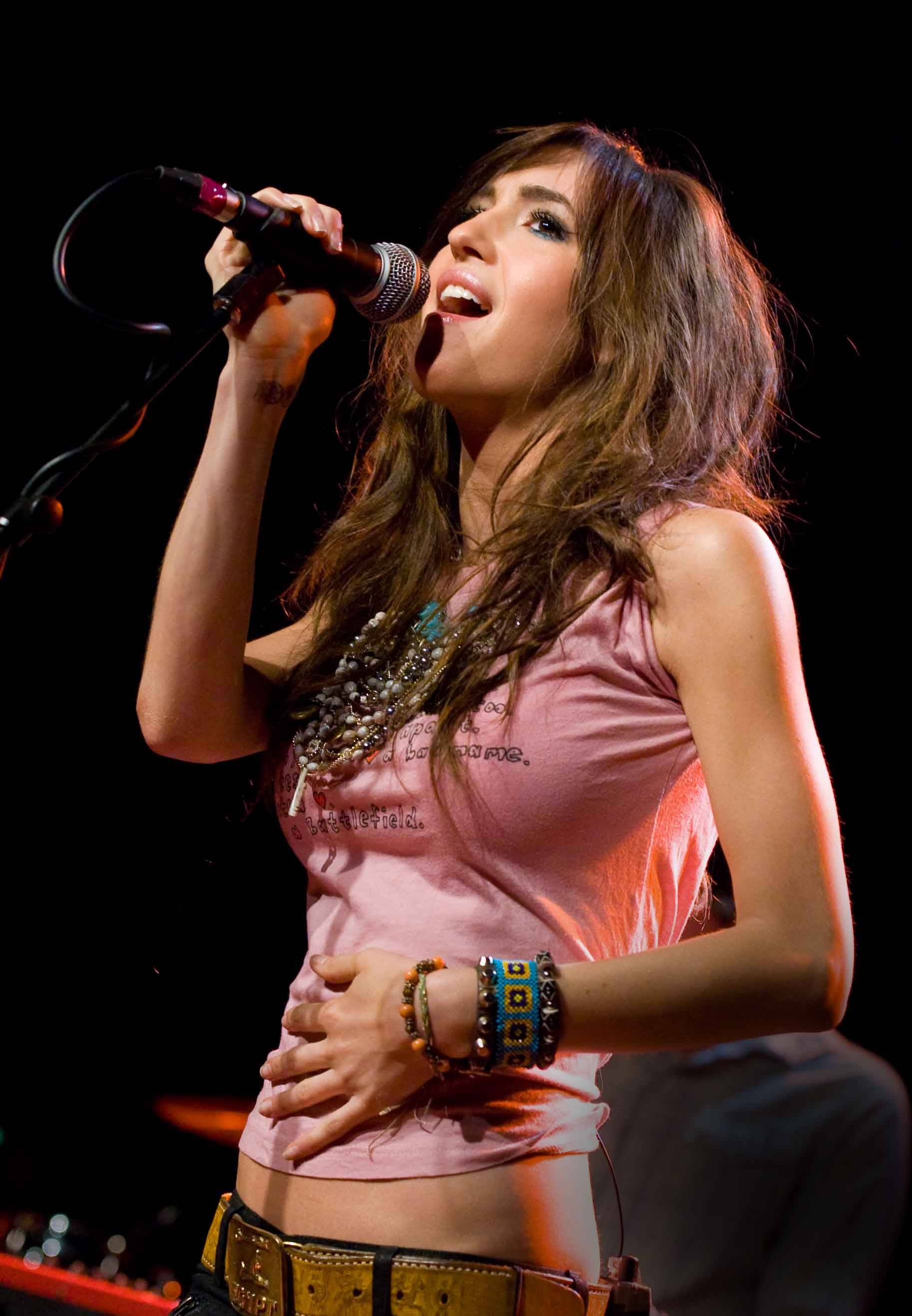
Kate Voegele

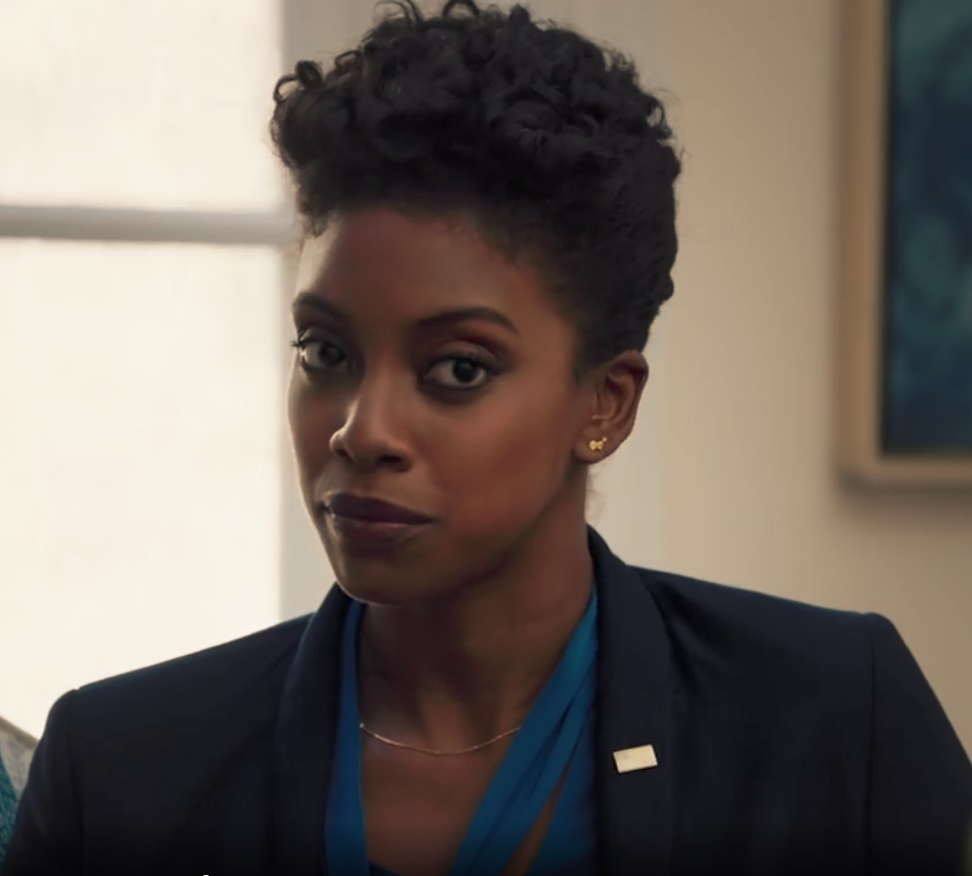
Condola Rashad

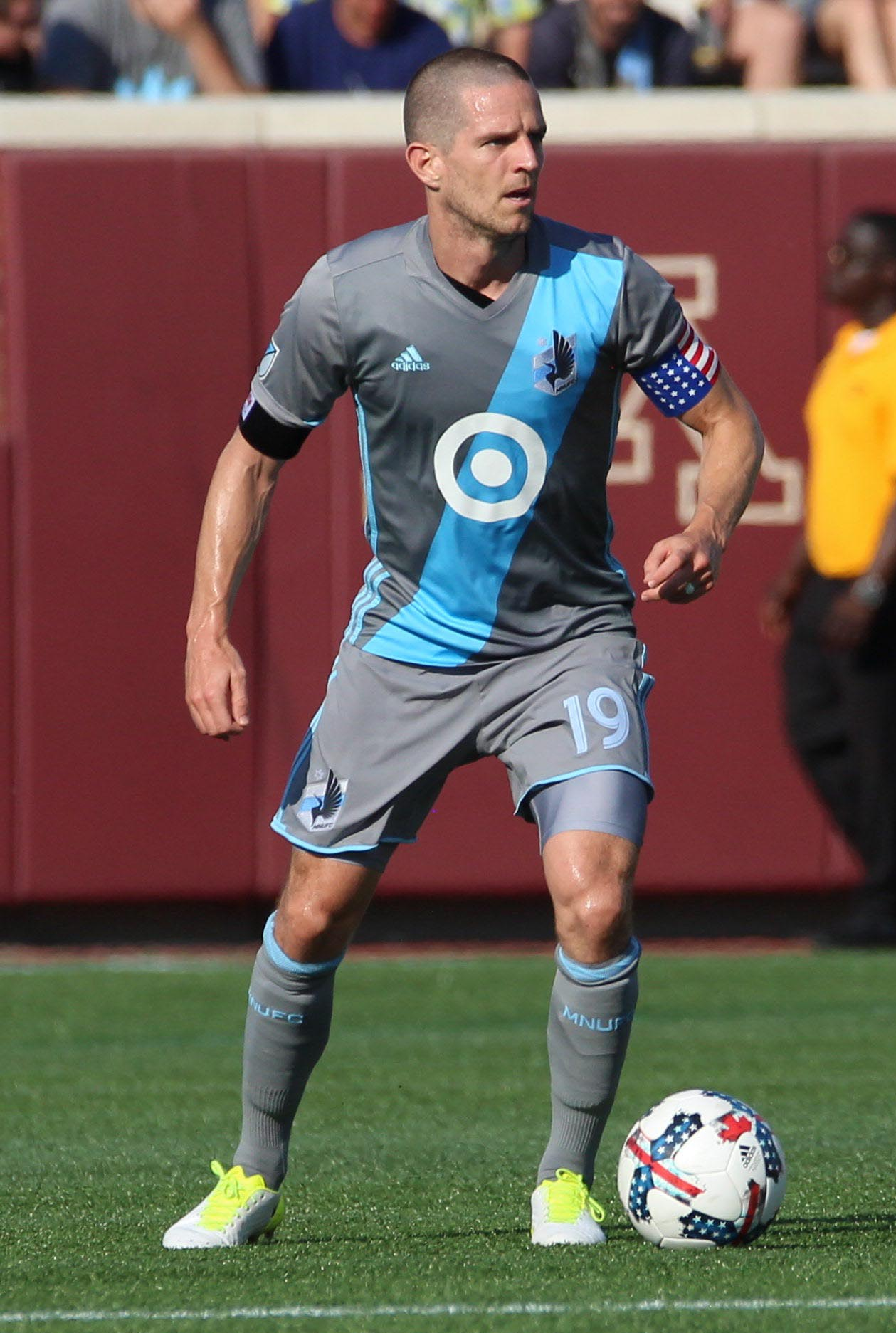
Sam Cronin

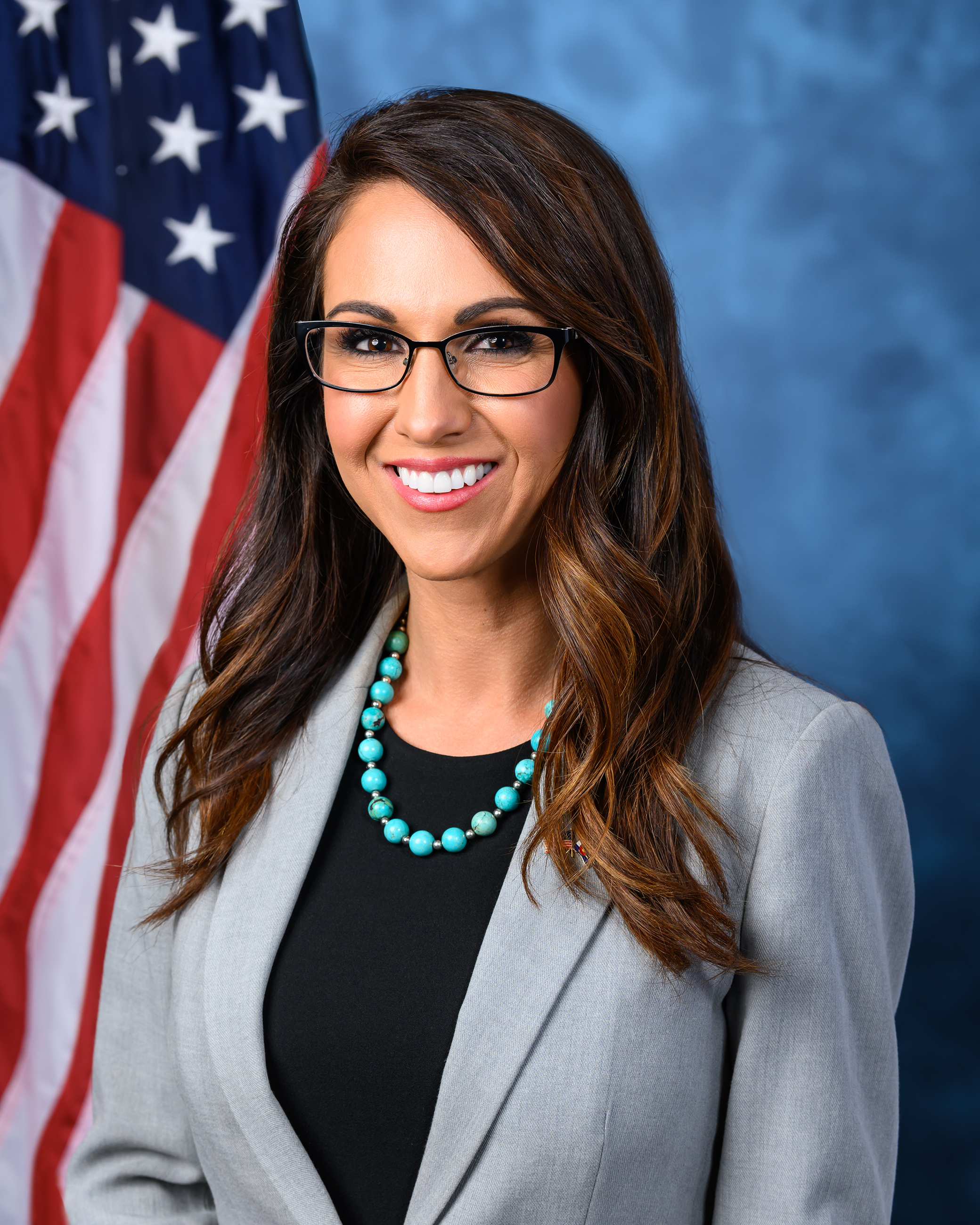
Lauren Boebert

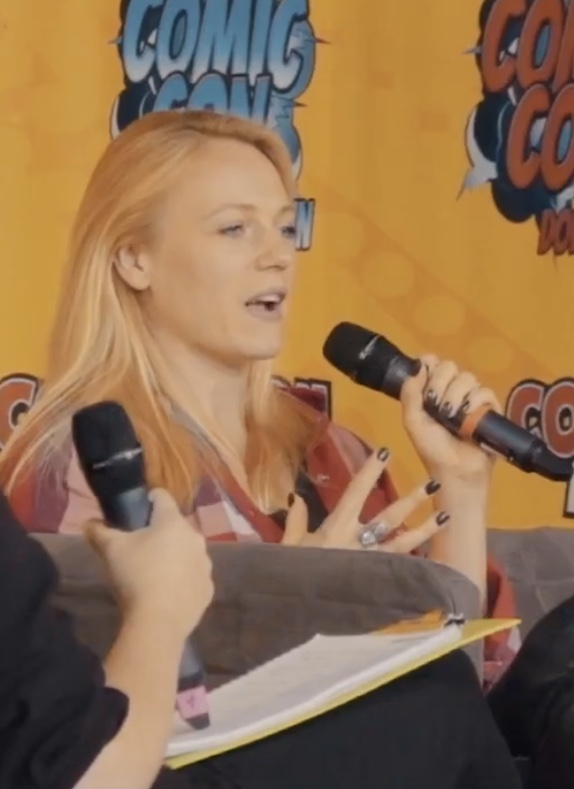
Emma Bell

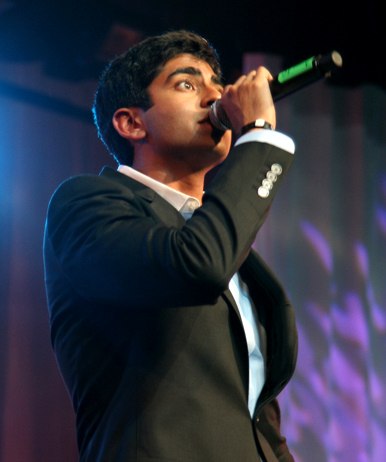
Anoop Desai

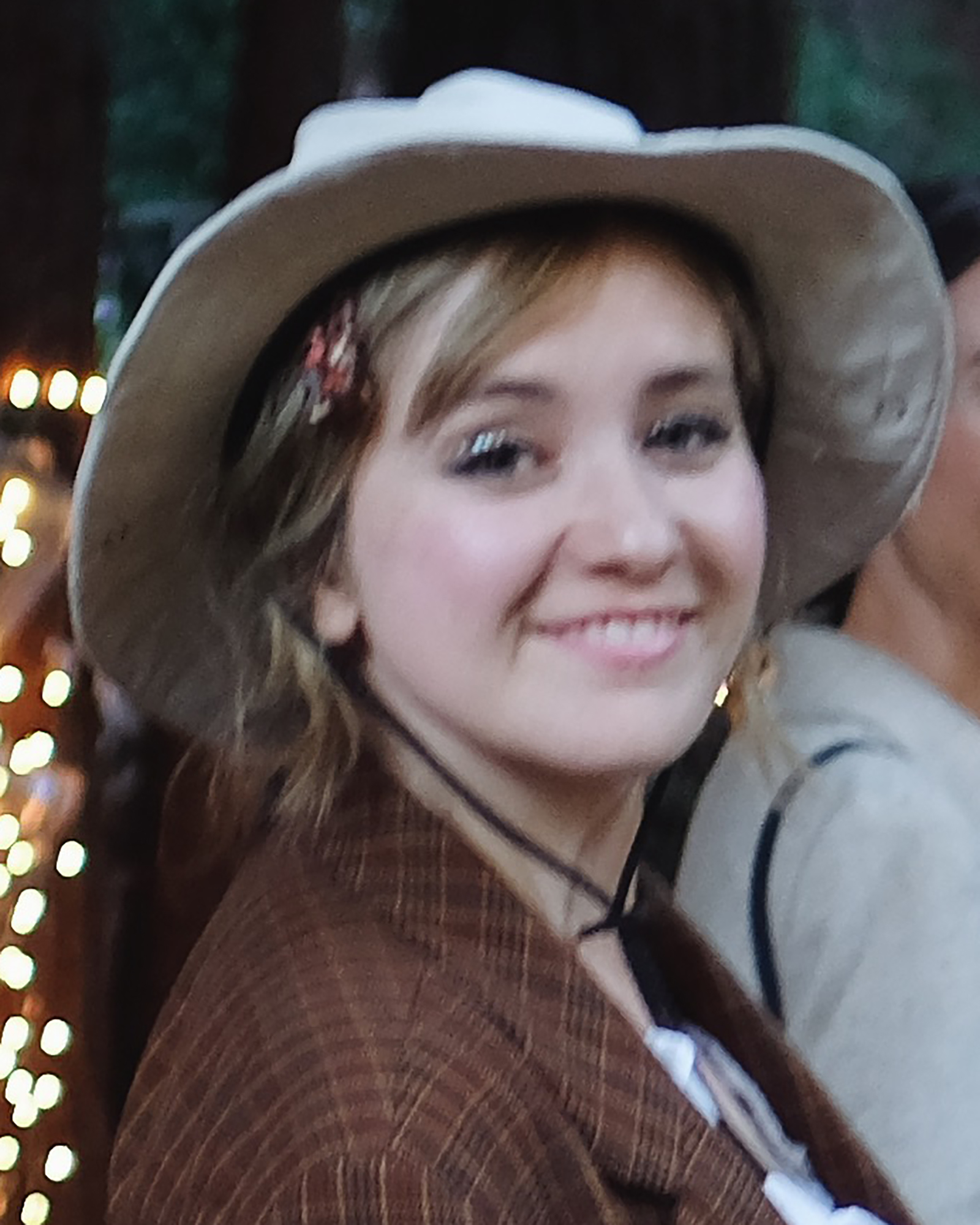
Noël Wells

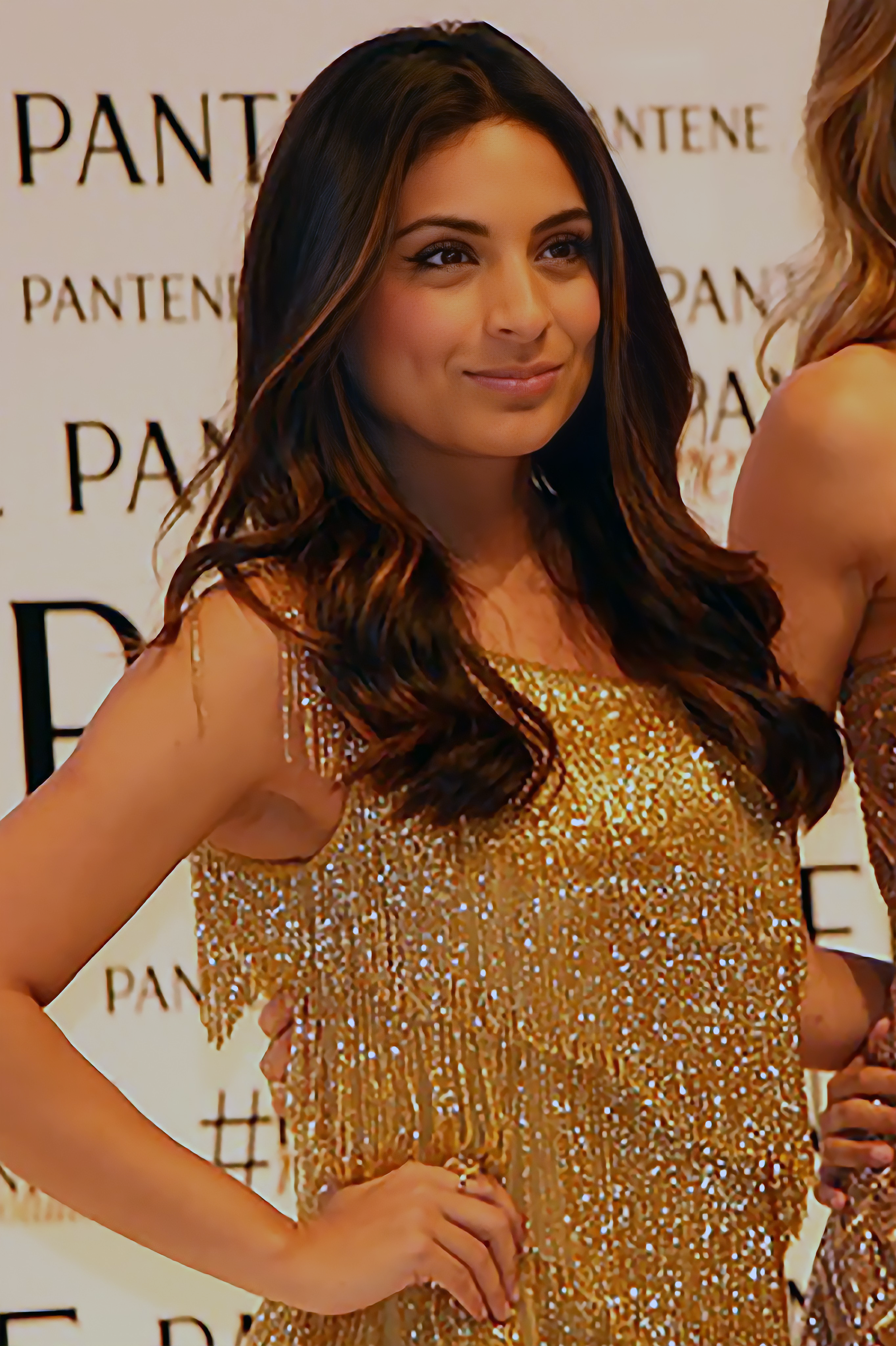
Ana Brenda Contreras

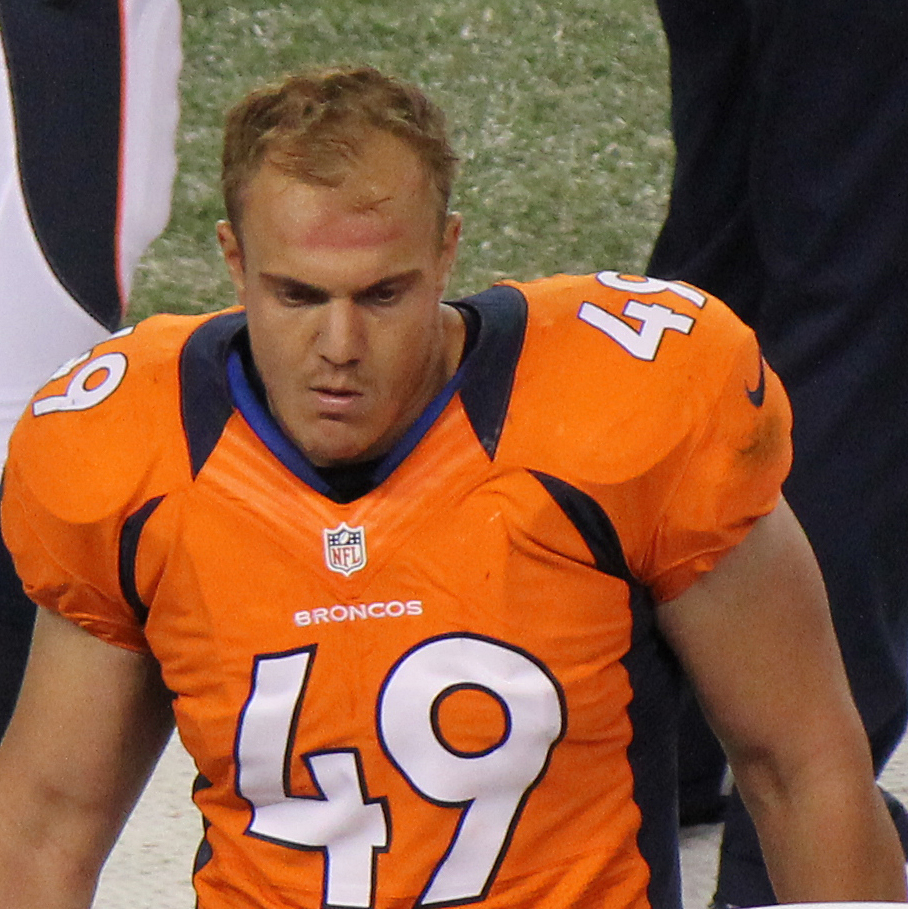
Chris Gronkowski

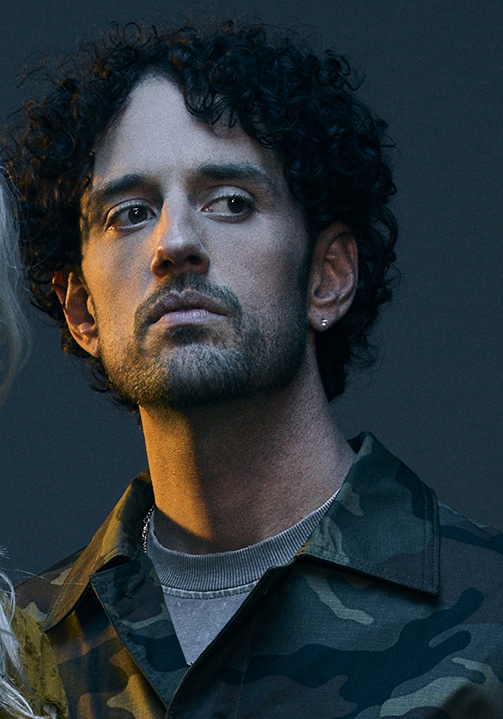
Colin Brittain

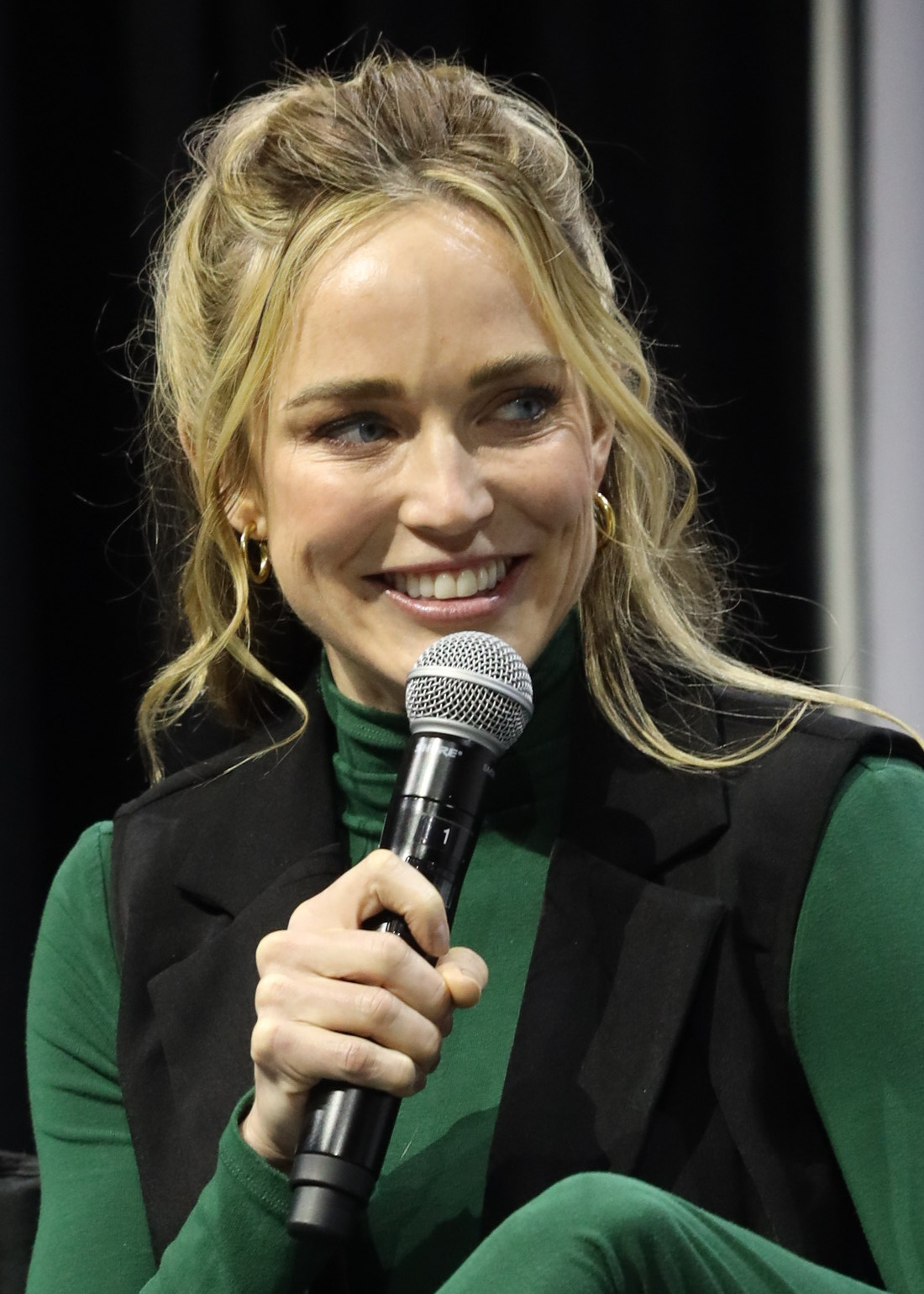
Caity Lotz

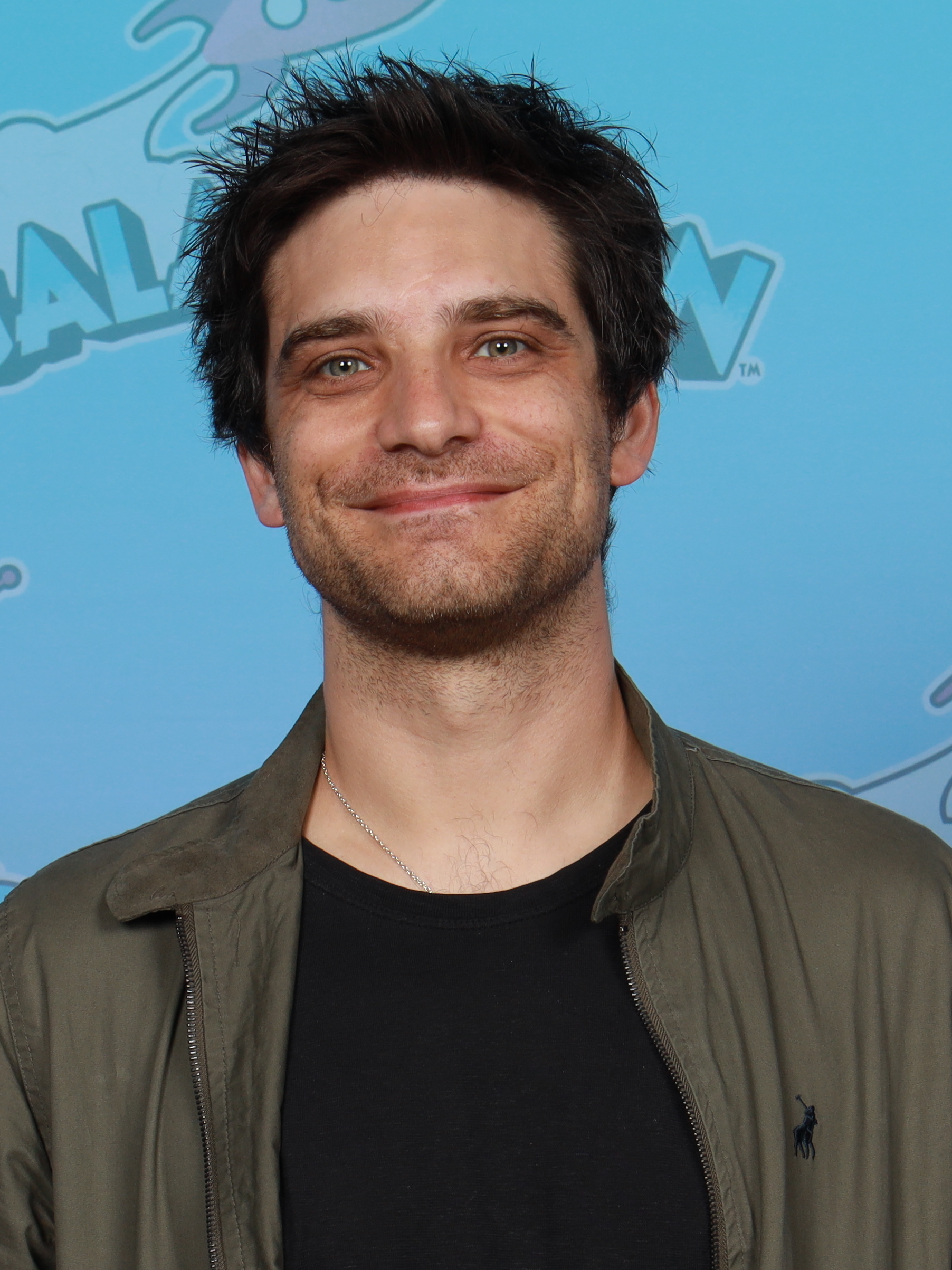
Jeff Ward

- December 1
  - Mandela Barnes, politician, 45th Lieutenant Governor of Wisconsin (2019-2023)
  - DeSean Jackson, football player
  - Andrew Tate, British-born kickboxer
- December 2
  - Jason Bennett, basketball player
  - Derek Cassidy, football player
  - Jackie Cruz, American-born Puerto Rican soccer player
  - Mardy Gilyard, football player
  - Lorenzo Washington, football player (d. 2021)
- December 3
  - Evan Beard, entrepreneur and co-founder of A Plus
  - Brittany Cameron, soccer player
  - Joshua Friedel, chess grandmaster
  - James Laurinaitis, football player
- December 4
  - Koby Clemens, baseball player
  - Amanda Fink, tennis player
  - Martell Webster, basketball player
- December 5
  - Zach Avery, actor and convicted felon
  - LeGarrette Blount, football player
  - Justin Smoak, baseball player
- December 6
  - Freddie Barnes, football player
  - Matt Clapp, football player
  - Matt Niskanen, hockey player
- December 7
  - Nita Strauss, rock musician and guitarist
- December 8
  - Enzo Amore, wrestler
  - Ashley Campbell, country singer/songwriter
  - Kate Voegele, musician and actress
- December 9
  - Nissim Black, rapper, songwriter, and record producer
  - Shane Bowen, football coach
  - Amanda Cappelletti, politician
  - Brianna Felnagle, middle-distance runner
- December 10
  - Kahlil Bell, football player
  - Matt Clark, baseball player
  - Elaine Welteroth, journalist
- December 11
  - Cedric Agnew, boxer
  - Steven Black, football player
  - Tyvon Branch, football player
  - Condola Rashad, actress
- December 12
  - Shea Buckner, Olympic water polo player
  - Joey Cantens, basketball coach
  - Sam Cronin, soccer player
  - John Napier, Olympic bobsleigher
  - Fahim Saleh, entrepreneur (d. 2020)
  - Cam Thomas, football player
- December 13
  - Dennis Bermudez, mixed martial artist
  - Zachary Laoutides, actor, screenwriter, and filmmaker
  - Sunita Mani, actress
  - Jonathan B. Wright, actor
  - McCall Zerboni, soccer player
- December 14
  - Andrew Tate, kickboxer/internet personality
  - Levi Coleman, soccer player
  - Stephen Keech, singer/songwriter and frontman for Haste the Day
- December 15
  - Lauren Boebert, politician
  - Andre Brown, football player
  - Nick Buss, baseball player
  - West Cox, politician
  - Ester Dean, singer
  - Jane Park, golfer
- December 16
  - Bryan Anderson, baseball player
  - Nicole Fawcett, volleyball player
  - FDA Music, Saudi-born rapper
  - Ryan Lollis, baseball player
- December 17
  - Emma Bell, actress
  - Austin Gibbs, singer and musician
  - Vanessa Zima, actress
- December 18
  - 3D Na'Tee, rapper
  - Ron Brace, football player (d. 2016)
  - Chris Carter, baseball player
  - Marcus Cousin, basketball player
  - Bill Stull, football player
- December 19
  - Jessica Adair, basketball player
  - Adam Amin, sportscaster
  - Chris Brooks, gymnast
  - Ingrid Burley, rapper and songwriter
  - Andrew Combs, singer/songwriter and guitarist
  - Tyrell Sutton, football player
- December 20
  - Kane Beatz, record producer and songwriter
  - Natascha Bessez, singer, actress, and beauty pageant titleholder
  - Sean Cunningham, American-born Dutch basketball player
  - Anoop Desai, singer
  - Tori Hall, TV personality and pageant winner
- December 22
  - Krystal Joy Brown, actress
  - Chris Chancellor, football player
  - Jeff Choquette, stock car racing driver
  - Camille Thurman, jazz musician
  - Jeffery Wood, actor
- December 23
  - Alex Field, football player
  - Noël Wells, actress and comedian
- December 24
  - Darrius Barnes, soccer player
  - Chris Cockrum, stock car racer
  - Ana Brenda Contreras, American-born Mexican actress and singer
  - Tim Elliott, mixed martial artist
- December 25
  - Tumbo Abanikanda, football player
  - Josh Baker, football player
  - Zak Boggs, soccer player
  - Patrick Brown, football player
- December 26
  - Joe Alexander, basketball player
  - Josh Beech, English-born singer/songwriter
  - Chykie Brown, football player
  - Chris Gronkowski, football player
- December 27
  - Phillip Buffington, soccer player
  - Jamaal Charles, football player
- December 28
  - Armon Bassett, basketball player
  - Chase Beeler, football player
  - Lauren Stephens, cyclist
- December 29
  - Colin Brittain, songwriter, producer, and drummer for Linkin Park (2024-present)
  - Chris Creveling, Olympic speed skater
  - Sullivan Fortner, jazz pianist
  - Ally Maki, actress
- December 30
  - Jon Cox, soccer player
  - Demetrius Crawford, football player
  - Sierra Fellers, skateboarder
  - Caity Lotz, actress, dancer, and singer
  - Jeff Ward, actor
- December 31
  - Adam Chanler-Berat, actor and singer
  - Nate Freiman, baseball player

- Assumed -

Jane - probable girlfriend to P. Diddy (Sean John Combs)

=== Full date unknown ===
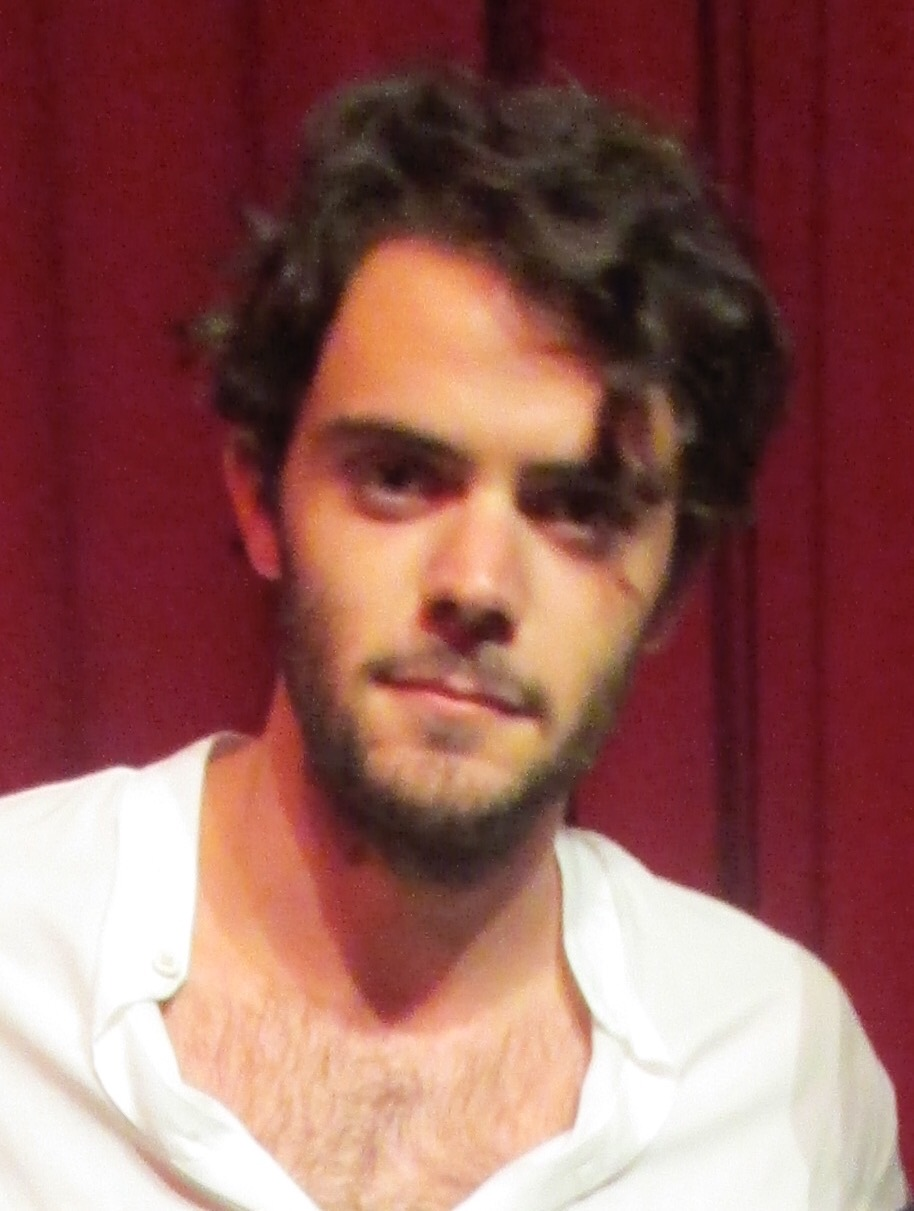
Tanner Cohen

- Nasreldin Abdelbari, Sudanese-born author, lawyer, and human rights advocate
- Intisar Abioto, artist and storyteller
- Sharon Aguilar, Panamanian-born multi-instrumentalist and singer/songwriter
- Andrew J. Allen, saxophonist
- Jake Allston, sound designer
- Isaiah Andrews, economist and professor at Harvard University
- Krystina Arielle, actor and cosplayer
- Jes Baker, writer, photographer, and activist
- Carter Beckworth, singer/songwriter
- Salehe Bembury, footwear designer
- Sam Biddle, technology journalist
- Sarah Biscarra-Dilley, artist, curator, and writer
- Bjorn Bjorholm, bonsai artist
- Erin Boheme, jazz singer
- Brandon Bolmer, singer/songwriter, music producer, and visual artist
- Clarissa Bonet, artist and photographer
- Botzy, rapper
- Calvin Brock, basketball player
- Tania Marie Caringi, Italian-born model (d. 2025)
- Frankie Celenza, chef
- Steph Cha, novelist and fiction writer
- Michelle Chamuel, singer/songwriter and producer
- Marika Cifor, archivist
- Cobi, musician
- Tanner Cohen, actor and singer
- Petra Cortright, artist
- Rob Crane, Olympic sailor
- Amie Cunat, artist
- Angela Faustina, contemporary realism artist
- Justin Favela, mixed-media artist
- Ron Ferguson, politician
- Liana Finck, cartoonist and author
- Jordan Fliegel, entrepreneur and venture capitalist
- Edgar Flores, politician
- Gerardo Flores, convicted murderer
- Egan Frantz, artist
- Eugene Kotlyarenko, Ukrainian-born director, screenwriter, producer, and actor
- Andrea Lo, internet entrepreneur
- Pidgeon Pagonis, intersex activist
- Aly Tadros, singer/songwriter
- Cassie Taylor, singer/songwriter
- Jeffery Thompson, football player, comic book author, filmmaker, and entrepreneur

== Deaths ==
=== January ===
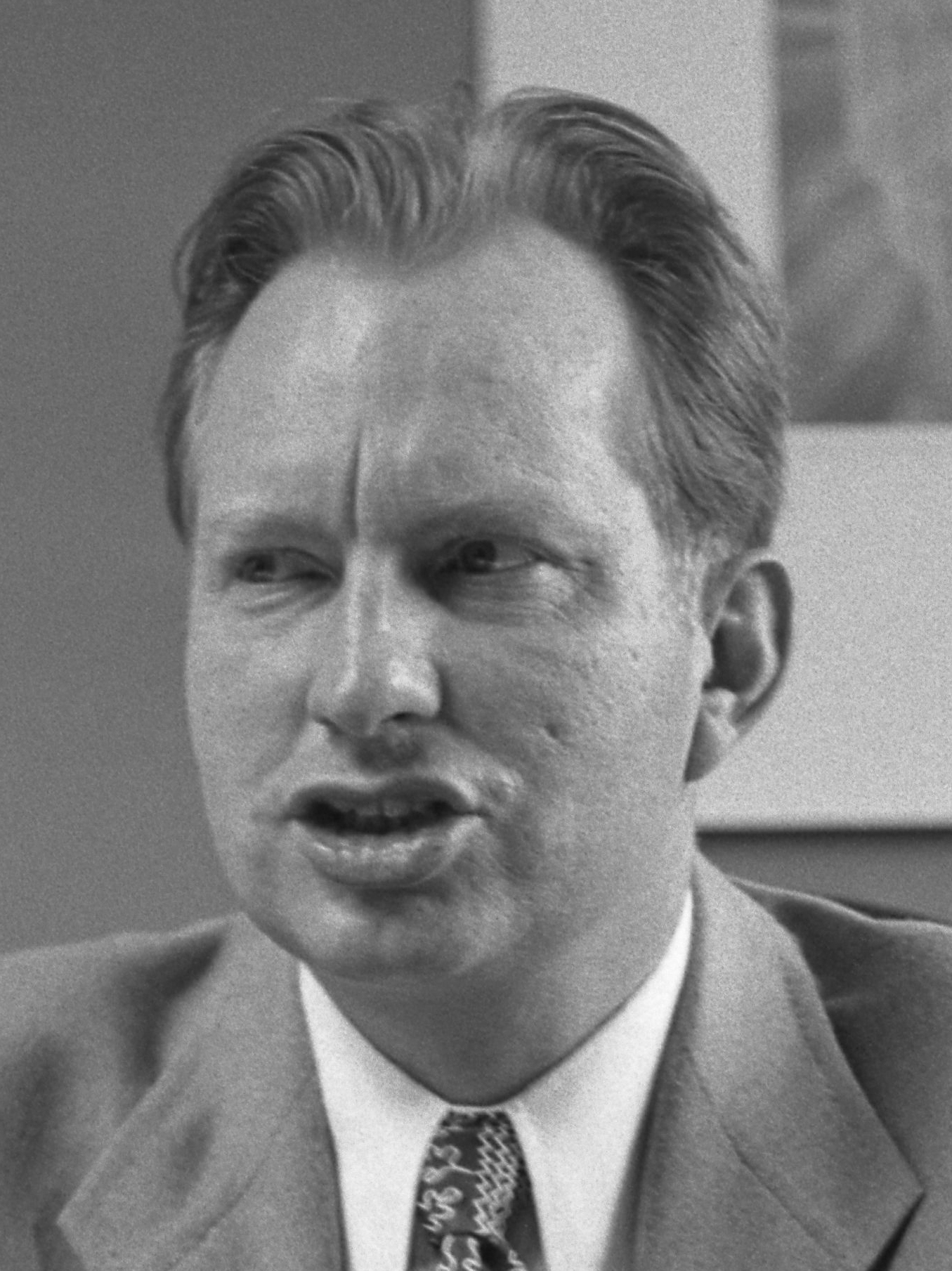
L. Ron Hubbard

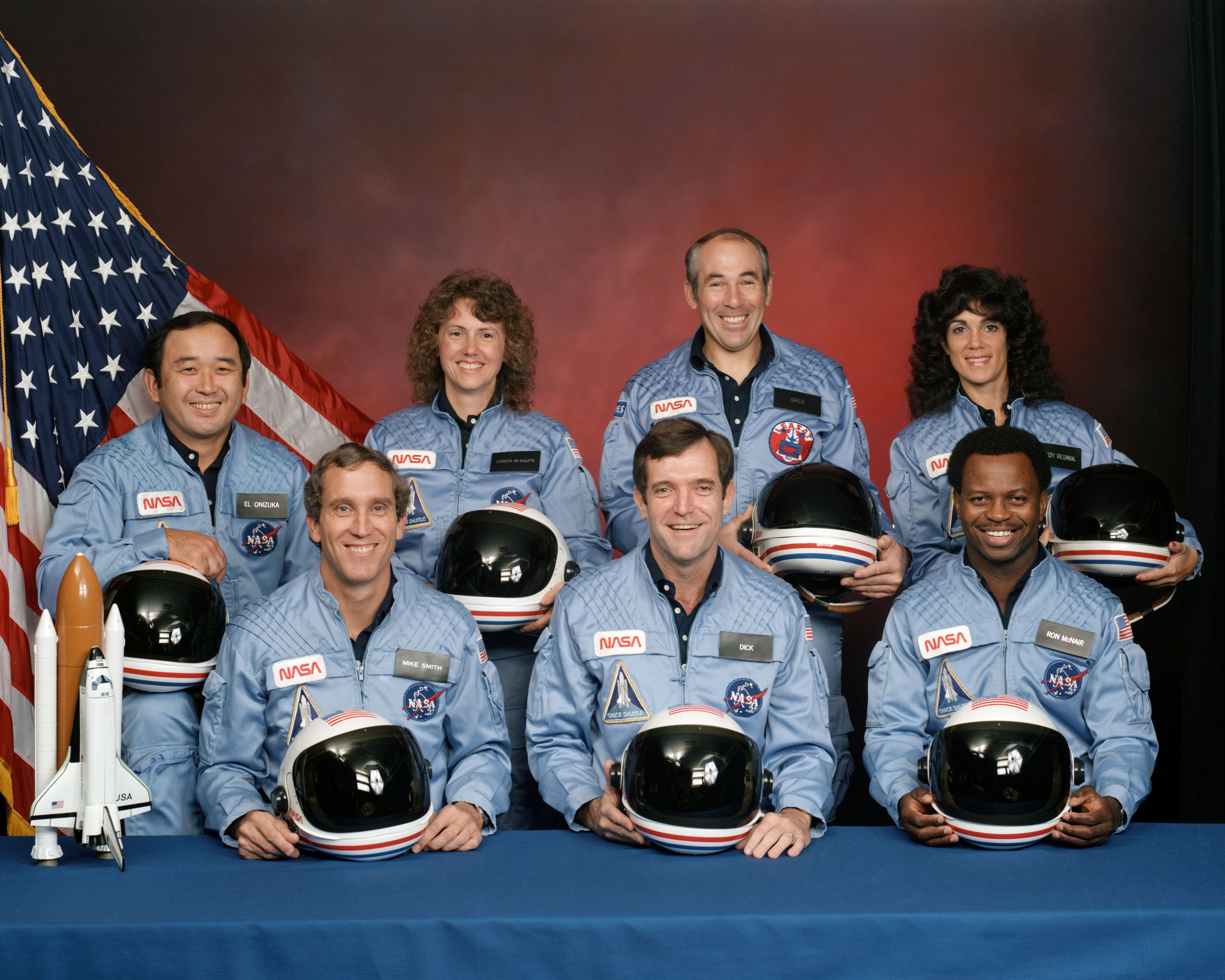
STS-51-L crew

- January 6 –
  - Una Merkel, actress (b. 1903)
  - P. D. Eastman, author and illustrator (b.1909)
- January 14 – Donna Reed, actress (b. 1921)
- January 16 – Herbert W. Armstrong, founder of the Worldwide Church of God (b. 1892)
- January 23 – Willard Van Dyke, filmmaker and photographer (b. 1906)
- January 24
  - Gordon MacRae, actor, singer, and host (b. 1921)
  - L. Ron Hubbard, science fiction author, founder of Scientology (b. 1911)
- January 27 – Lilli Palmer, actress and writer (b. 1914)
- January 28 – crew of the Space Shuttle Challenger on mission STS-51-L:

Gregory Jarvis, astronaut and engineer (b. 1944)
Christa McAuliffe, school teacher (b. 1948)
Ronald E. McNair, astronaut and physicist (b. 1950)
Ellison Onizuka, astronaut (b. 1946)
Judith Resnik, astronaut and engineer (b. 1949)
Francis R. Scobee, astronaut (b. 1939)
Michael J. Smith, astronaut (b. 1945)

- January 29 – Leif Erickson, actor (b. 1911)

=== February ===
- February 1 – Ida Rhodes, mathematician, pioneer in computer programming (b. 1900)
- February 2 – Gino Hernandez, wrestler (b. 1957)
- February 11 – Frank Herbert, writer (b. 1920)
- February 16 – Howard Da Silva, actor (b. 1909)
- February 17 – Paul Stewart, actor (b. 1908)
- February 19 – Barry Seal, smuggler of drugs and arms, aircraft pilot, and money launderer and former Trans Worlds Airlines pilot (b. 1939)

=== March ===
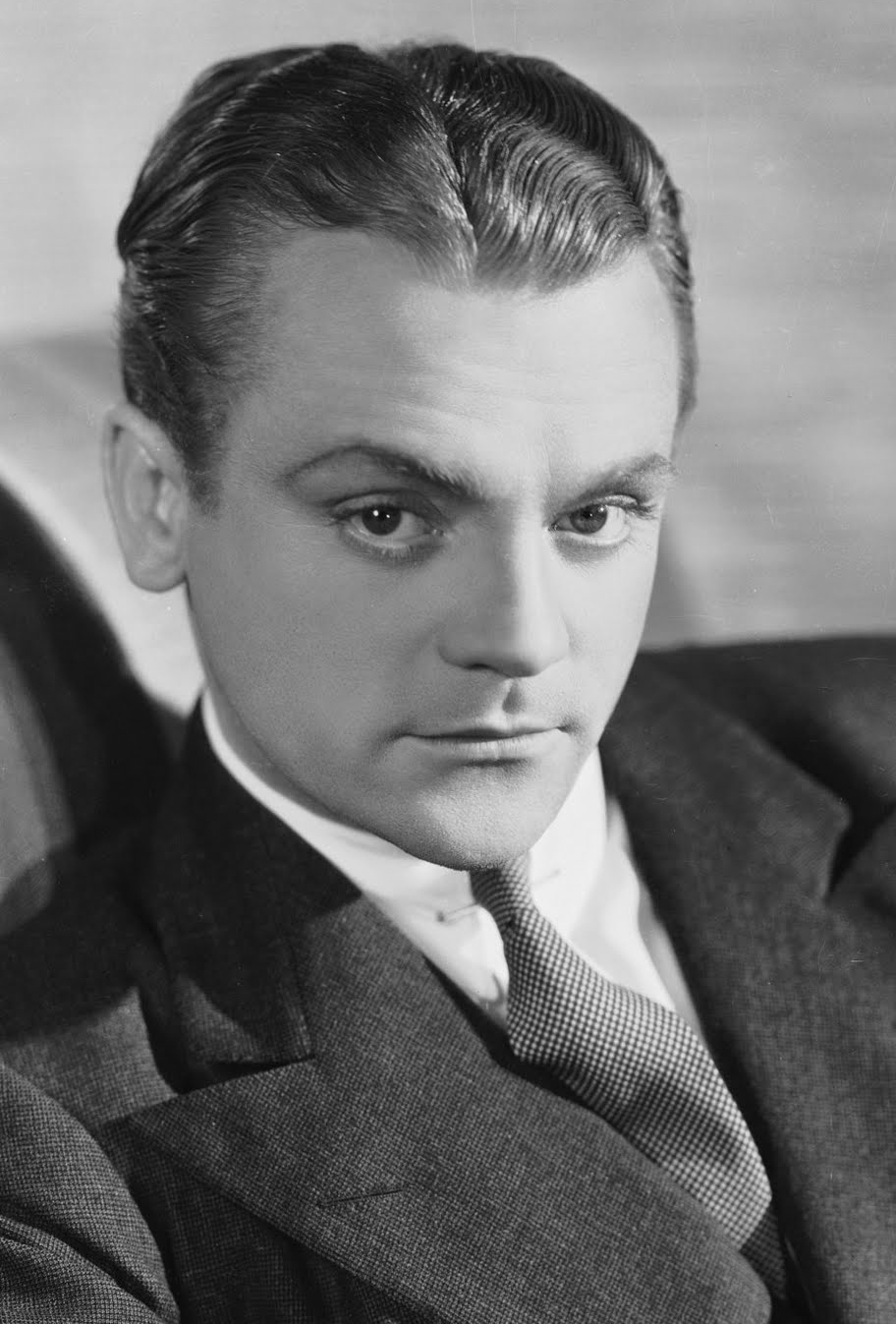
James Cagney

- March 2 – William D. Mullins, politician and baseball player (b. 1931)
- March 4 – Howard Greenfield, songwriter (b. 1936)
- March 6
  - Adolph Caesar, actor (b. 1933)
  - Georgia O'Keeffe, artist (b. 1887)
- March 10 – Ray Milland, Welsh-born actor and director (b. 1907)
- March 18 – Bernard Malamud, novelist and short story writer (b. 1914)
- March 19 – Jon Lormer, actor (b. 1906)
- March 22 – Charles Starrett, actor (b. 1903)
- March 28 – Virginia Gilmore, actress and wife of Yul Brynner (b. 1919)
- March 29 – Harry Ritz, American actor (b. 1907)
- March 30 – James Cagney, actor (b. 1899)
- March 31 – Jerry Paris, American actor and director (b. 1925)

=== April ===
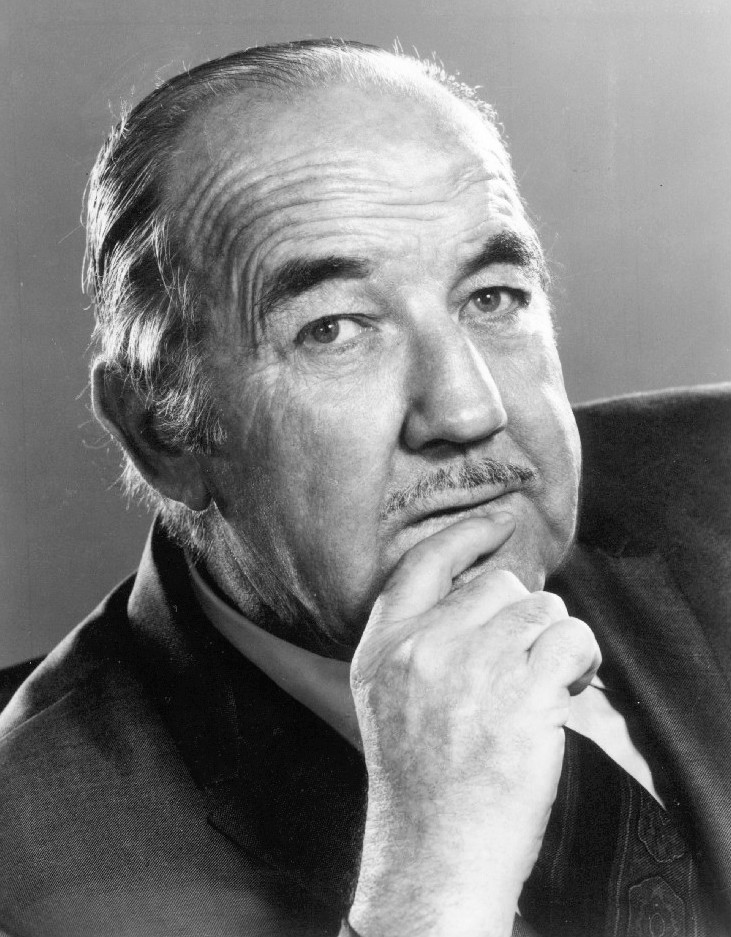
Broderick Crawford

- April 13 – Stephen Stucker, actor (b. 1947)
- April 15 – Tim McIntire, actor (b. 1944)
- April 17 – Paul Costello, Olympic rower – double sculls (b. 1894)
- April 19 – Alvin Childress, actor (b. 1907)
- April 23
  - Harold Arlen, music composer (b. 1905)
  - Otto Preminger, Austrian-born film director (b. 1905)
- April 26
  - Broderick Crawford, actor (b. 1911)
  - Bessie Love, actress (b. 1898)
- April 27 – J. Allen Hynek, ufologist (b. 1910)

=== May ===
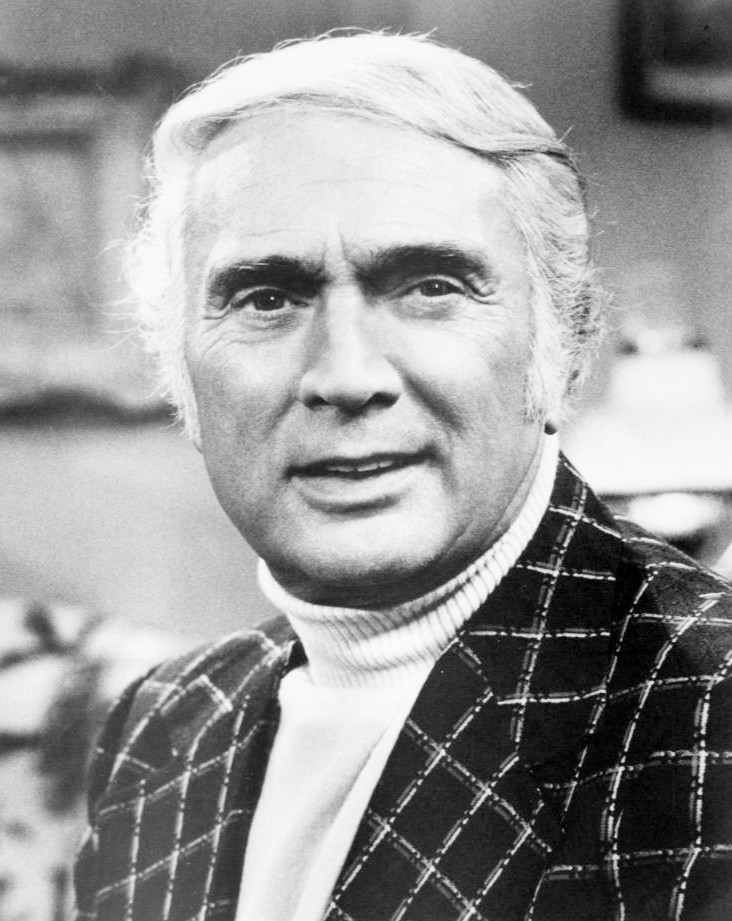
Robert Alda

- May 1 – Hugo Peretti, songwriter and record producer (b. 1916)
- May 3 – Robert Alda, actor (b. 1914)
- May 7 – Jeffrey Mylett, actor and songwriter (b. 1949)
- May 9 – Herschel Bernardi, actor (b. 1923)
- May 11 – Henry Plumer McIlhenny, art collector, socialite and philanthropist (b. 1910)
- May 15 – Theodore H. White, writer (b. 1915)
- May 20 – Helen B. Taussig, cardiologist (b. 1898)
- May 22 – Martin Gabel, actor (born 1911)
- May 23 – Sterling Hayden, actor (b. 1916)
- May 24 – Yakima Canutt, actor and stuntman (b. 1895)
- May 25 – Chester B. Bowles, politician (b. 1901)
- May 26 – Gian-Carlo Coppola, film producer (b. 1963)
- May 28
  - Don MacLaughlin, actor (b. 1906)
  - Lurene Tuttle, actress (b. 1907)
- May 30 – Perry Ellis, fashion designer (b. 1940)
- May 31 – James Rainwater, physicist, Nobel Prize laureate (b. 1917)

=== June ===
- June 5 – Bryan Grant, tennis champion (b. 1909)
- June 11 – Chesley Bonestell, painter (b. 1888)
- June 13 – Benny Goodman, jazz musician (b. 1909)
- June 14
  - Alan Jay Lerner, lyricist (b. 1918)
  - Marlin Perkins, zoologist and television host (b. 1905)
- June 17 – Kate Smith, singer (b. 1907)
- June 19 – Len Bias, basketball player (b. 1963)
- June 27 – Don Rogers, football player (b. 1962)
- June 28 – Mary Anderson, actress (b. 1897)
- June 29 – Robert Drivas, actor (b. 1935)

=== July ===
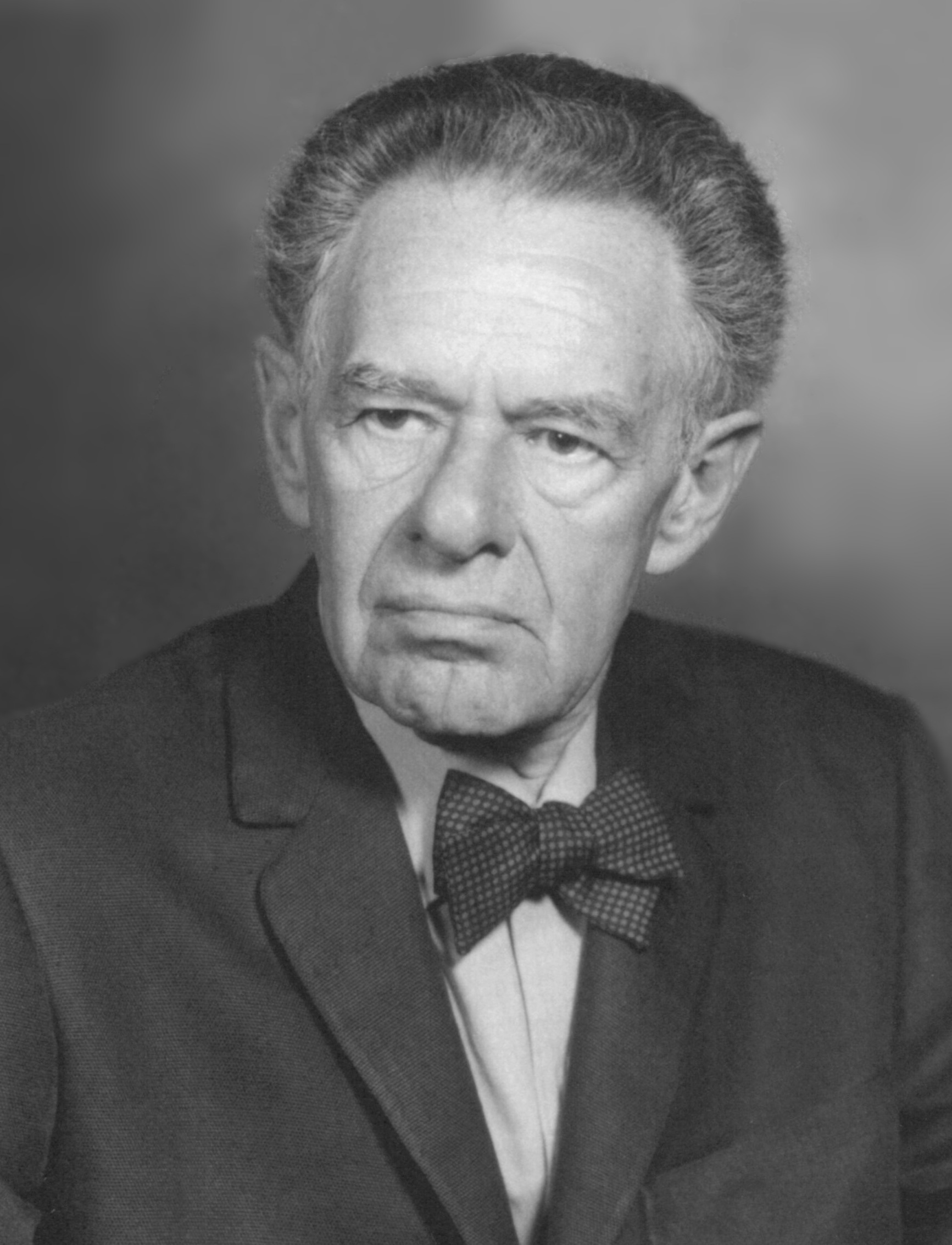
Fritz Albert Lipmann

- July 3 – Rudy Vallée, radio show host, bandleader, singer, actor (b. 1901)
- July 8 – Hyman G. Rickover, admiral (b. 1900)
- July 14 – Raymond Loewy, French-born industrial designer (b. 1893)
- July 15 – Florence Halop, actress (b. 1923)
- July 18 – Buddy Baer, boxer and actor (b. 1915)
- July 22 – Floyd Gottfredson, cartoonist (b. 1905)
- July 24 – Fritz Albert Lipmann, German-born biochemist, recipient of the Nobel Prize in Physiology or Medicine (b. 1899)
- July 25
  - Ted Lyons, baseball player (Chicago White Sox) and member of the MLB Hall of Fame (b. 1900)
  - Vincente Minnelli, film director (b. 1903)
- July 26 – W. Averell Harriman, American diplomat and politician (b. 1891)
- July 31 – Teddy Wilson, jazz pianist (b. 1912)

=== August ===
- August 2 – Roy Cohn, American lawyer (b. 1927)
- August 11 – Chuck McKinley, American tennis champion (b. 1941)
- August 13 – Way Bandy, American make-up artist (b. 1941)
- August 21 – Thad Jones, American jazz musician (b. 1923)
- August 23 – Ben C. Duniway, American judge (b. 1907)
- August 26 – Ted Knight, American actor (b. 1923)

=== September ===
- September 1 – Murray Hamilton, actor (b. 1923)
- September 4 – Hank Greenberg, baseball player and member of the MLB Hall of Fame (b. 1911)
- September 6 – Blanche Sweet, actress (b. 1896)
- September 11 – Henry DeWolf Smyth, physicist (b. 1898)
- September 12 – Frank Nelson, actor (b. 1911)
- September 27 – Cliff Burton, Metallica bassist (b. 1962)

=== October ===
- October 5 – Hal B. Wallis, film producer (b. 1898)
- October 14 – Keenan Wynn, actor (b. 1916)
- October 15 – Jerry Smith, American professional football player (b. 1943)
- October 22 – Jane Dornacker, musician, actress, comedian, and reporter (b. 1947)
- October 23 – Edward Adelbert Doisy, biochemist, recipient of the Nobel Prize in Physiology or Medicine (b. 1893)
- October 25 – Forrest Tucker, actor (b. 1919)
- October 26 – Jackson Scholz, Olympic athlete (b. 1897)
- October 31 – Robert S. Mulliken, physicist and chemist, recipient of the Nobel Prize in Chemistry (b. 1896)

=== November ===
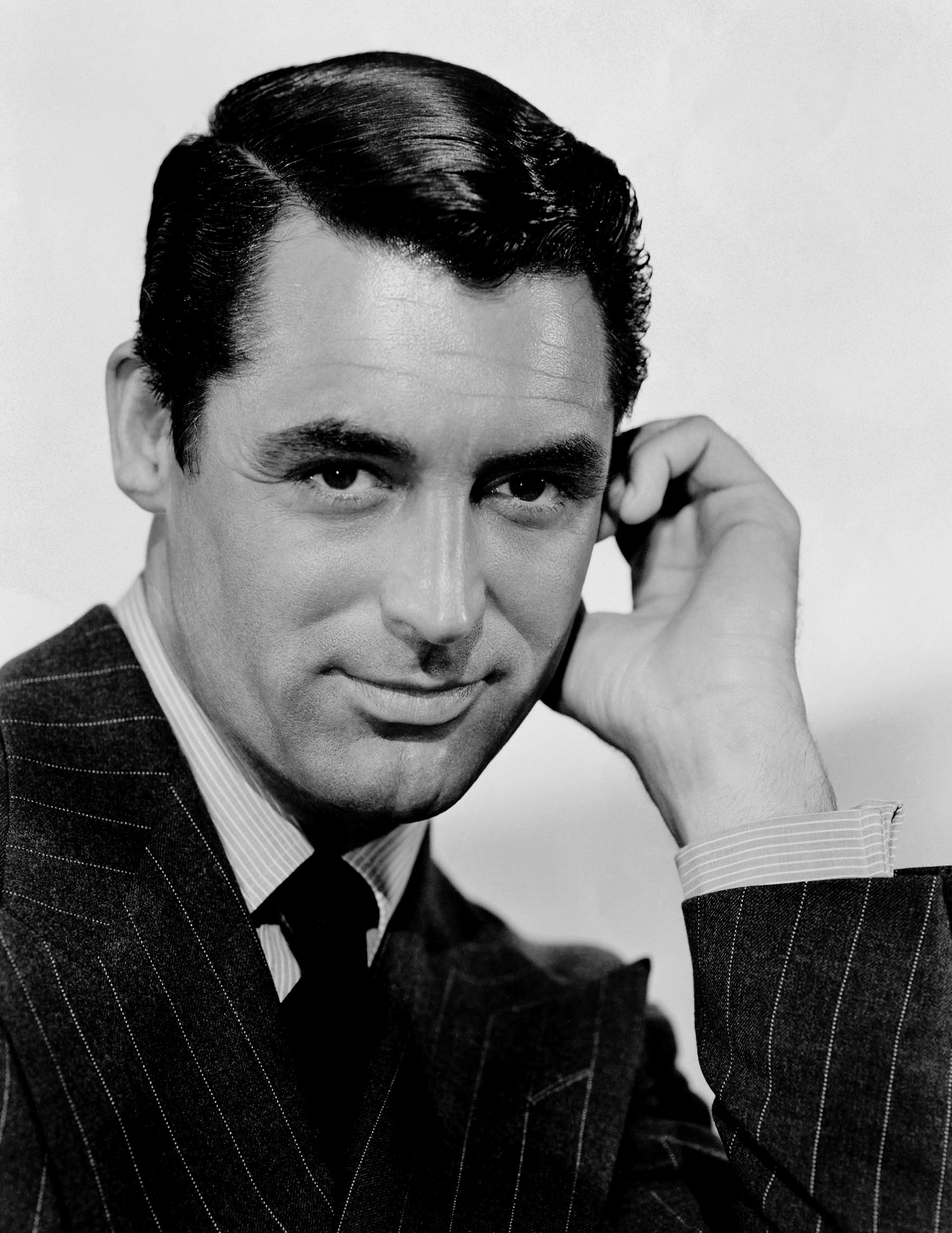
Cary Grant

- November 2 – Paul Frees, actor, comedian (b. 1920)
- November 5 – Bobby Nunn, singer (b. 1925)
- November 11 – Roger C. Carmel, actor (b. 1932)
- November 18 – Gia Carangi, supermodel (b. 1960)
- November 21
  - Jerry Colonna, comedian (b. 1904)
  - Dar Robinson, stunt performer and actor (b. 1947)
- November 22 – Scatman Crothers, actor and musician (b. 1910)
- November 24 – Al Smith, cartoonist (b. 1902)
- November 29 – Cary Grant, British-born actor (b. 1904)

=== December ===
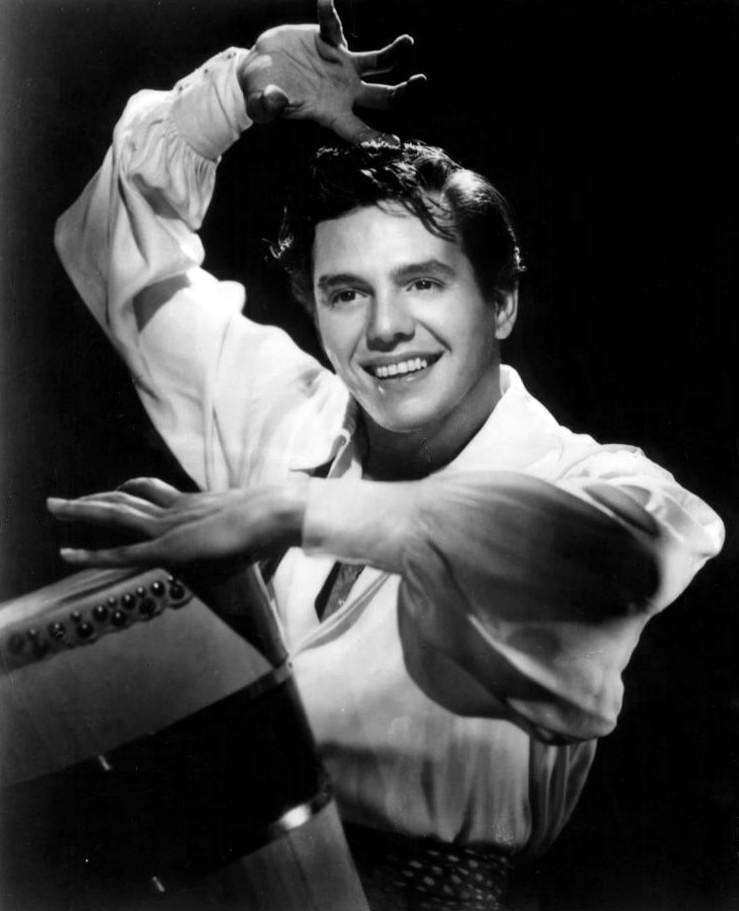
Desi Arnaz

- December 1 – Lee Dorsey, singer (b. 1924)
- December 2 – Desi Arnaz, Cuban-born actor, bandleader, musician and television producer; co-founder of Desilu Productions (b. 1917)
- December 10 – Susan Cabot, actress (b. 1927)
- December 13
  - Heather Angel, British-born actress (b. 1909)
  - Ella Baker, civil rights activist (b. 1903)
- December 19 – V. C. Andrews, novelist (b. 1923)
- December 24 – Gardner Fox, writer (b. 1911)
- December 26 – Elsa Lanchester, British-born actress (b. 1902)

== See also ==
- 1986 in American television
- List of American films of 1986
- Timeline of United States history (1970–1989)
