= List of post-Vietnam War Medal of Honor recipients =

The Medal of Honor was created during the American Civil War and is the highest military decoration presented by the United States government to a member of its armed forces. The recipients must have distinguished themselves at the risk of their own life above and beyond the call of duty in action against an enemy of the United States.

Since the April 1975 end of American presence in Vietnam, the United States military has been involved in a number of conflicts and peacekeeping activities, including actions in the invasion of Grenada, Lebanese Civil War, invasion of Panama, the Yugoslav Wars, the Somali Civil War and elsewhere. Following the September 11 attacks, the United States entered into a war on terror against militant Islamists, the War in Afghanistan and the Iraq War.

The Medal of Honor has been awarded to 33 U.S. servicemen for actions since Vietnam, nineteen to living recipients.

The first post-Vietnam Medal of Honor recipients were two Delta Force snipers, MSG Gary Gordon and SFC Randy Shughart, who volunteered to defend a downed helicopter pilot in the 1993 Battle of Mogadishu in Somalia; the medals were awarded posthumously.

== Recipients ==
=== Somali Civil War ===
The Battle of Mogadishu or for Somalis Ma-alinti Rangers ("The Day of the Rangers") was a battle that was part of Operation Gothic Serpent that was fought on October 3 and 4, 1993, in Mogadishu, Somalia, by forces of the United States supported by UNOSOM II against Somali militia fighters loyal to warlord Mohamed Farrah Aidid. The battle is also referred to as the First Battle of Mogadishu to distinguish it from the Second Battle of Mogadishu in 2006. The Medals were awarded to two Delta Force operators, both snipers, who volunteered to attempt to save the pilot of one of the downed UH-60 Black Hawk helicopters, despite facing hundreds, possibly thousands of rebels around the crash site.

Lavender background and † indicates that the Medal of Honor was awarded posthumously

Image	Name	Service	Rank	Place of action	Date of action	Unit	Notes
Head and torso of a white man with dark hair, wearing a military jacket with an assortment of ribbon bars and badges on the left breast and chevrons and patches on the upper sleeve.	Gary Gordon †	Army	Master sergeant	Mogadishu, Somalia	October 3, 1993	1st SFOD-D	For volunteering to secure a helicopter crash site while under heavy enemy fire until relief could arrive
Head and torso of a white man standing erect and looking upwards, wearing a military jacket with an assortment of ribbon bars and badges on the left breast and chevrons and patches on the upper sleeve.	Randy Shughart †	Army	Sergeant first class	Mogadishu, Somalia	October 3, 1993	1st SFOD-D	For volunteering to secure a helicopter crash site while under heavy enemy fire until relief could arrive

=== War in Afghanistan ===
The War in Afghanistan, which began on October 7, 2001, was launched by the United States, the United Kingdom, and NATO allies in response to the September 11, 2001 attacks. It was the beginning of the war on terrorism. The stated purpose of the invasion was to capture Osama bin Laden, destroy al-Qaeda, and remove the Taliban regime which had provided support and safe harbor to al-Qaeda.

Since 2001, 22 U.S. servicemen have received the Medal of Honor for actions in Afghanistan, six of them posthumously.

Lavender background and † indicates that the Medal of Honor was awarded posthumously

Image	Name	Service	Rank	Place of action	Date of action	Unit	Notes
Chief petty officer Edward Byers	Edward Byers	Navy	Chief special warfare operator	Laghman Province	December 8, 2012 – December 9, 2012	SEAL Team Six	For courageous actions while serving as part of a team that rescued a U.S. civilian being held hostage.
Lance Corporal Kyle Carpenter	Kyle Carpenter	Marine Corps	Lance corporal	Marjah, Helmand Province	November 21, 2010	2nd Battalion, 9th Marines, 6th Marine Regiment, Regimental Combat Team 1, 1st Marine Division	For risking his life by diving toward a grenade in an attempt to save a fellow Marine while their outpost was under attack.
Specialist Ty Carter	Ty Carter	Army	Specialist	Kamdesh District, Nuristan Province	October 3, 2009	3rd Squadron, 61st Cavalry Regiment, 4th Brigade Combat Team, 4th Infantry Division	For repeatedly risking his life under enemy fire during the Battle of Kamdesh: administering life-extending first aid to wounded comrade, obtaining ammunition for firefight, helping carry wounded to aid station.
Christopher Celiz	Christopher Celiz †	Army	Sergeant First Class	Paktia Province	July 12, 2018	Company D, 1st Battalion, 75th Ranger Regiment	Voluntarily exposed himself to intense enemy machine-gun and small-arms fire in order to retrieve and employ a heavy weapon system, thereby allowing U.S. and partnered forces to regain the initiative, maneuver to a secure location, and begin treating a critically wounded partnered force member.
SrA John Chapman	John A. Chapman †	Air Force	Technical Sergeant	Paktia Province	March 4, 2002	24th Special Tactics Squadron	Engaged two enemy bunkers during the Battle of Takur Ghar, enabling a pinned rescue team to move to cover and break enemy contact. Left behind by the SEALs he had rescued after being knocked unconscious, he was later killed providing covering fire for an arriving quick reaction force.
MAJ Nicholas Dockery	Nicholas Dockery	Army	Second Lieutenant	Kapisa Province	October 2, 2012	2nd Battalion, 12th Infantry Regiment	Engaged ambushing the Taliban forces that attacked the unit, he rallied American and Afghans. He provided aid for a wounded American, consolidated his allies, used his body to shield an ally from an exploding grenade, and rescued an unconscious ally from being taken by the Taliban. After, he exposed himself to direct gunships to provide suppressive fire upon Taliban forces.
Head and torso portrait of a young white man in a formal military uniform with a U.S. flag in the background	Salvatore Giunta	Army	Specialist	Korengal Valley, Kunar Province	October 25, 2007	2nd Battalion (Airborne), 503rd Infantry Regiment, 173rd Airborne Brigade Combat Team	For risking his life to save a wounded soldier from being captured. Was the first living recipient since the Vietnam War.
Captain Florent Groberg	Florent Groberg	Army	Captain	Asadabad, Kunar Province	August 8, 2012	12th Infantry Regiment, 4th Infantry Division	For risking his life by running toward a suicide bomber, grabbing him, and pushing him away before the bomb detonated, greatly minimizing casualties.
	Dakota Meyer	Marine Corps	Corporal	Ganjgal, Kunar Province	September 8, 2009	Embedded Training Team 2-8	Defied order from superiors and rescued 23 Afghan allies and 13 Americans in the Battle of Ganjgal.
Young white man in military fatigues	Robert James Miller †	Army	Staff sergeant	Nari District, Kunar Province	January 25, 2008	3rd Battalion, 3rd Special Forces Group	Fatally shot while diverting gunfire from Taliban forces in Afghanistan so that his fellow soldiers could escape.
A white man with close-cropped blond hair standing with his hands in his pockets, wearing a camouflage uniform and a long blue and white scarf hanging untied around his neck. Behind him are a wall of sandbags, a tree and, in the distance, mountains.	Jared C. Monti †	Army	Sergeant first class	Gowardesh, Nuristan Province	June 21, 2006	3rd Squadron, 71st Cavalry, 3rd Brigade Combat Team, 10th Mountain Division	Killed while trying to rescue a wounded soldier from intense small arms and rocket-propelled grenade fire
Top half of young man in circa 2000 dress U.S. Navy uniform of junior officer.	Michael P. Murphy †	Navy	Lieutenant	Near Asadabad, Kunar Province	June 28, 2005	SEAL Delivery Vehicle Team 1	Led a four-man reconnaissance team in a fight against superior numbers, exposed himself to hostile fire in order to call for help
	Michael Ollis †	Army	Staff sergeant	Ghazni Province	August 28, 2013	Company B, 2nd Battalion, 22nd Infantry Regiment, 1st Brigade Combat Team, 10th Mountain Division	Protecting a Polish army officer during a suicide bombing
Headshot portrait of a man wearing an Army Combat Uniform and Army Ranger tan beret.	Leroy Petry	Army	Staff sergeant	Paktia Province	May 26, 2008	2nd Battalion, 75th Ranger Regiment	While shot through both legs, saved his fellow Rangers by picking up and throwing a live enemy grenade, thus amputating his hand.
	Ryan M. Pitts	Army	Sergeant	Kunar Province	July 13, 2008	2nd Battalion (Airborne), 503rd Infantry Regiment, 173rd Airborne Brigade Combat Team	For his courageous actions while serving as a Forward Observer during the Battle of Wanat.
	Earl D. Plumlee	Army	Sergeant First Class	Forward Operating Base Ghazni	August 28, 2013	Operation Detachment Alpha 1434 (ODA-1434), 4th Battalion, 1st Special Forces Group	For repeatedly engaging the enemy at close range, was wounded by a detonating suicide vest, risked his life to bring another Soldier to safety and provide first aid, all while continually putting himself in the line of fire in order to prevent the assault from penetrating the perimeter of the FOB.
	Clinton Romesha	Army	Staff sergeant	Kamdesh, Nuristan Province	October 3, 2009	3rd Squadron, 61st Cavalry Regiment, 4th Brigade Combat Team, 4th Infantry Division	For risking his life to save fellow soldiers and organize and repel an attack against Taliban forces during the Battle of Kamdesh.
	Ronald J. Shurer	Army	Staff sergeant	Nuristan Province	April 6, 2008	3rd Battalion, 3rd Special Forces Group	For his courageous actions while serving as a Combat Medic during the Battle of Shok Valley.
Master Chief Petty Officer Britt Slabinski	Britt Slabinski	Navy	Senior chief special warfare operator	Paktia Province	March 4, 2002	SEAL Team Six	Senior Chief Slabinski repeatedly exposed himself to deadly fire to personally engage the enemy and orient his team's fires in the furious, close-quarters firefight.
	William D. Swenson	Army	Captain	Ganjgal, Kunar Province	September 8, 2009	1st Battalion, 32nd Infantry Regiment, 3rd Brigade Combat Team, 10th Mountain Division	For risking his life, under enemy fire, to render medical aid to a fellow wounded soldier, and rescue others and recover fallen comrades, during the Battle of Ganjgal.
	Kyle J. White	Army	Specialist	Nuristan Province	November 9, 2007	2nd Battalion (Airborne), 503rd Infantry Regiment, 173rd Airborne Brigade Combat Team	For repeatedly risking his life under enemy fire to render life saving medical aid to wounded comrades, and radioing situation reports to enable counterattack and rescue.
	Matthew O. Williams	Army	Sergeant	Nuristan Province	April 6, 2008	3rd Battalion, 3rd Special Forces Group	For his courageous actions during the Battle of Shok Valley.

=== Iraq War ===
The Iraq War, also known as the Second Gulf War, Operation Iraqi Freedom (US), Operation TELIC (UK) or the occupation of Iraq, was a conflict which began on March 20, 2003, with the United States-led invasion of Iraq by a multinational coalition composed of U.S. and British troops supported by smaller contingents from Australia, Poland, and other nations. Seven service members have received the Medal of Honor for actions in Iraq: five from the Army, one from the Marine Corps and one from the Navy. Just one of them was living.

Lavender background and † indicates that the Medal of Honor was awarded posthumously

Image	Name	Service	Rank	Place of action	Date of action	Unit	Notes
Head and shoulders of a man in U.S. Army uniform, before a large American flag.	Travis Atkins †	Army	Staff sergeant	Yusufiyah, Iraq	June 1, 2007	Company D, 2d Battalion, 14th Infantry, 10th Mountain Division	Fought hand-to-hand with a suicide bomber and used his body to shield fellow soldiers from the subsequent bomb blast
	David Bellavia	Army	Staff sergeant	Fallujah, Iraq	November 10, 2004	2nd Battalion, 2nd Infantry Regiment, 1st Infantry Division	For single-handedly clearing three stories of building from insurgents, even resorting to hand-to-hand combat to complete his task.
Soldier poses for photo between circa 2000 and circa 2005	Alwyn Cashe †	Army	Sergeant first class	Salah ad Din Governorate, Iraq	October 17, 2005	1st Battalion, 15th Infantry Regiment, 3rd Infantry Division	Saved the lives of six of his fellow soldiers after the Bradley fighting vehicle they were riding in struck an improvised explosive device, despite suffering second and third-degree burns over 72% of his body.
Head and shoulders of serious young man in circa 2000 U.S. Marine dress uniform.	Jason Dunham †	Marine Corps	Corporal	Iraq, near Syrian border	April 14, 2004	3rd Battalion 7th Marines	Fought hand-to-hand with the enemy and hurled himself on a grenade to protect fellow Marines
Head and shoulders of a smiling young man in circa 2000 U.S. Army uniform with beret, before a large American flag.	Ross A. McGinnis †	Army	Specialist	Adhamiyah, Iraq	December 4, 2006	C Company, 1-26th Infantry, 1st Infantry Division	Saved the lives of four soldiers by diving on a grenade while inside HMMWV (Humvee)
Soldier in action in circa 2000 U.S. camouflage battle dress, carrying a combat rifle and wearing sunglasses and helmet. Behind him in the dusty air is a similarly equipped soldier.	Michael A. Monsoor †	Navy	Master-at-arms second class	Ramadi, Iraq	September 29, 2006	SEAL Team Three, Delta Platoon	Saved the lives of his fellow SEALs at his sniper position by diving on a grenade
Head and shoulders of smiling man in circa 2000 U.S. Army battle dress.	Paul R. Smith †	Army	Sergeant first class	Saddam International Airport, Iraq	April 4, 2003	B Company, 11th Engineer Battalion, 3rd Infantry Division	Held the enemy at bay by throwing grenades and returning accurate small arms fire; allowing for the wounded to be carried out, died in the process

=== Operation Inherent Resolve ===
One soldier received the Medal of Honor during the fight against ISIL during the Combined Joint Task Force – Operation Inherent Resolve.

Image	Name	Service	Rank	Place of action	Date of action	Unit	Notes
Sgt. Maj. Thomas "Patrick" Payne	Thomas Payne	Army	Sergeant First Class	Hawija, Iraq	October 22, 2015	1st SFOD-D	Rescued 70 Iraqi prisoners in a joint operation, conducted with the Kurdish (Peshmerga) CTG (Counter Terrorism Group). Payne ran into a collapsing building three times to make sure all hostages were out and safe while taking heavy enemy fire.

=== Venezuelan intervention ===
One soldier received the Medal of Honor during the 2026 United States intervention in Venezuela which captured Venezuelan president Nicolás Maduro and his wife, Cilia Flores.

Image	Name	Service	Rank	Place of action	Date of action	Unit	Notes
Chief Warrant Officer Eric Slover	Eric Slover	Army	Chief Warrant Officer 5 (CW5)	Greater Caracas, Venezuela	January 3, 2026	160th SOAR(A)	Chinook helicopter pilot whose legs were torn by machine gun fire, but safely landed the helicopter, allowing the mission to continue.
