= Lott Trophy =

College football award

Lott IMPACT Trophy
- Awarded for: Awarded to a defensive college football player who excels in personal character and athletically
- Country: United States
- Presented by: Pacific Club IMPACT Foundation

History
- First award: 2004; 22 years ago
- Most recent: Ohio State safety Caleb Downs
- Website: lottimpacttrophy.org

The Lott IMPACT Trophy is presented annually to a defensive college football player of the year for their personal character and athletic abilities. IMPACT is an acronym for: Integrity, Maturity, Performance, Academics, Community, and Tenacity. The award selection is voted on by members of the national media, previous finalists, the board of directors of the Pacific Club IMPACT Foundation. The award is named in honor of Ronnie Lott.

== Purpose and criteria ==
The 2011 Lott IMPACT Trophy was awarded to the college football Defensive IMPACT Player of the Year at The Pacific Club in Newport Beach, California on December 11, 2011. The Pacific Club IMPACT Foundation has donated $930,000 to charities including $400,000 for college scholarships since its formation in 2004. The IMPACT Player of the Week is selected each week of the college football season from the players on the Lott IMPACT Trophy Watch List. A $1,000 scholarship was awarded to the winner's university general scholarship fund.

== Foundation board of advisors ==
The Pacific Club IMPACT Foundation board of advisors include: Peter Arbogast, Steve Atwater, Harris Barton, John Brodie, Brad Budde, Dick Butkus, Mark Carrier, Chuck Cecil, Jack Del Rio, Chris Doleman, Vince Ferragamo, Mike Giddings, Kevin Greene, Rosey Grier, John Hall, Phil Hansen, John Holecek, Ed Hookstratten, Tom Holmoe, Jim Jeffcoat, Brent Jones, Henry Jones, Chuck Knox, Willie Lanier, Jim Leonhard, Howie Long, Pat McInally, Mark May, Matt Millen, Joe Montana, Tory Nixon, Ken Norton, Jr., Mel Owens, Rodney Peete, Clancy Pendergast, Gary Plummer, John Seymour, Lynn Swann and Keena Turner.

== Winners ==
Year	Player	Position	School	Ref.
2004	David Pollack	LB	Georgia	
2005	DeMeco Ryans	LB	Alabama	
2006	Daymeion Hughes	CB	California	
2007	Glenn Dorsey	NT	LSU	
2008	James Laurinaitis	LB	Ohio State	
2009	Jerry Hughes	DE	TCU	
2010	J. J. Watt	DE	Wisconsin	
2011	Luke Kuechly	LB	Boston College	
2012	Manti Te'o	LB	Notre Dame	
2013	Anthony Barr	LB	UCLA	
2014	Eric Kendricks	LB	UCLA (2)	
2015	Carl Nassib	DE	Penn State	
2016	Jabrill Peppers	LB	Michigan	
2017	Josey Jewell	LB	Iowa	
2018	Josh Allen	LB	Kentucky	
2019	Derrick Brown	DT	Auburn	
2020	Paddy Fisher	LB	Northwestern	
2021	Aidan Hutchinson	DE	Michigan (2)	
2022	Will Anderson Jr.	LB	Alabama (2)	
2023	Junior Colson	LB	Michigan (3)	
2024	Travis Hunter	CB/WR	Colorado	
2025	Caleb Downs	S	Ohio State (2)	

== Honorary Lott IMPACT Trophy recipients ==
The first Honorary Lott Trophy was awarded posthumously to Pat Tillman, an American football player who left his professional career and enlisted in the United States Army in June 2002 in the aftermath of the September 11 attacks. He joined the Army Rangers and served several tours in combat before he was killed by friendly fire in the mountains of Afghanistan.

In 2009, Boston College linebacker Mark Herzlich was presented with the second Honorary Lott Trophy. Herzlich missed the entire 2009 season due to Ewing sarcoma, a rare form of bone cancer, which he overcame and earned numerous honors for his courage and outreach, including the Disney Spirit Award, Nils V. "Swede" Nelson Award, and the ACC Commissioner's Cup.

In 2010, Tyrone Fahie (Nebraska) and Owen Marecic (Stanford) received Honorary Lott Trophies. Fahie, aged 28, was the oldest walk-on in Cornhuskers team history. Prior to playing college football, Fahie served in the U.S. Navy. Fahie was deployed twice to Iraq during his six years in the military, rising to the rank of petty officer second class. Upon completing his service time, he enrolled at Nebraska and a year later tried out for the team.

In 2011, Sgt. Dakota Meyer, a Medal of Honor recipient, was awarded the Honorary Lott Trophy. On September 8, 2009, Meyer was one of 13 American military trainers embedded with a unit of 80 Afghan soldiers headed for a routine meeting with local elders in the village of Ganjgal, located in a valley along the border with Pakistan. Four trainers at the front of the U.S.-Afghan force were immediately trapped by the heavy enemy fire believed to be coming from as many as 150 Taliban fighters. Positioned at the rear when the ambush began, Meyer and other members of his unit disobeyed orders to remain in place and used a Humvee to rush into the kill zone to try to rescue the four trapped at the head of their column. Manning the Humvee's turret gun, Meyer killed at least eight insurgents and rescued 36 Afghan and American troops in his first four attempts to reach the four trapped trainers. He and his team members finally broke through to their position on the fifth attempt and moved on foot through a hail of gunfire only to find they had been killed in the fighting. Meyer then retrieved their remains. When he presented the award to Meyer, President Barack Obama said: "You did your duty above and beyond, and you kept the faith with the highest traditions of the Marine Corps you love. You represent the best of a generation that has served with distinction through a decade of war." Meyer was presented the Honorary Lott Trophy by Major General Ronald Bailey.

Former UCLA coach Terry Donahue was awarded an Honorary Lott Trophy in 2016 for his work with the California Showcase, an annual tryout for high school football players to receive financial aid to play in college.
