= William Swenson =

William Swenson may refer to:

- William D. Swenson, United States Army Officer, recipient of the Medal of Honor
- Will Swenson (actor), American actor
