= Edward Byers =

US Navy SEAL and Medal of Honor recipient (born 1979)

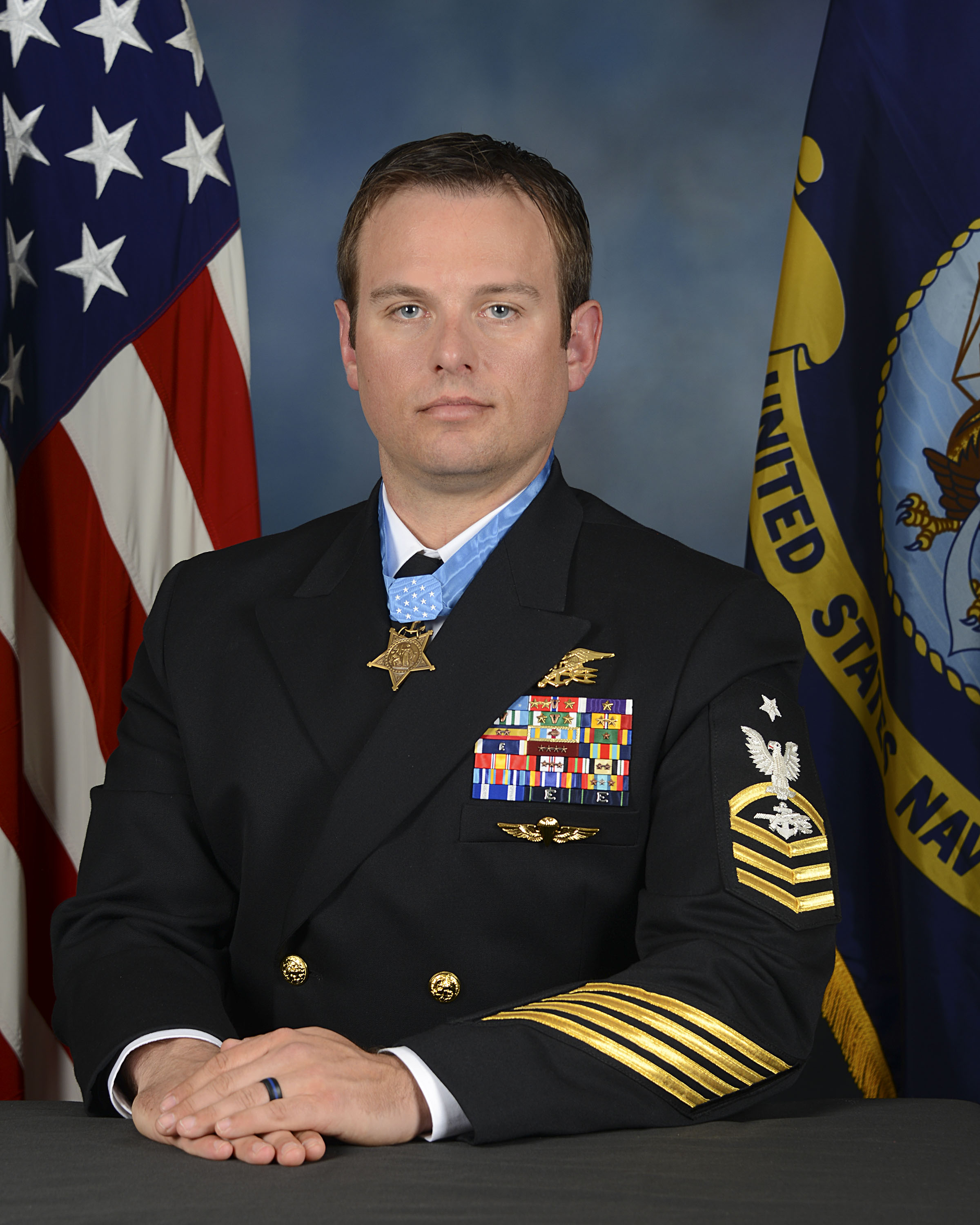
- Official portrait of Byers in March 1, 2016
- Born: August 4, 1979 (age 47); Toledo, Ohio, United States
- Military career
- Allegiance: United States
- Branch: United States Navy
- Service years: 1998–2020
- Rank: Command master chief petty officer
- Unit: DEVGRU
- Conflicts: War in Afghanistan; Iraq War
- Awards: Medal of Honor; Bronze Star Medal with Valor device (5); Purple Heart (2); Meritorious Service Medal; Joint Service Commendation Medal with Valor device Navy and Marine Corps Commendation Medal with Valor device (3)

Edward C. Byers Jr. (born August 4, 1979) is a retired United States Navy SEAL who received the Medal of Honor on February 29, 2016, for the rescue of a civilian in Afghanistan in 2012. Byers retired after 21 years of service on September 19, 2019, at the Washington Navy Yard.

== Early life and education ==
Born in Toledo, Ohio, growing up in Grand Rapids, Byers graduated from Otsego High School in Tontogany, Ohio, in 1997. He is a Roman Catholic. His father is a World War II Navy veteran. While in his youth, he was a scout in the Boy Scouts of America, achieving the rank of first class.

== Naval career ==
Byers enlisted in the United States Navy in September 1998 and went on to serve as a hospital corpsman. Byers first served at Great Lakes Naval Hospital and was later attached to the 2nd Battalion, 2nd Marines, in 1999 and deployed with the 26th Marine Expeditionary Unit aboard USS Austin (LPD-4). He attended Basic Underwater Demolition/SEAL training in 2002 and graduated with BUD/S Class 242. Following SEAL Qualification Training (SQT), he received the Navy Enlisted Classification (NEC) 5326 as a Combatant Swimmer (SEAL), entitled to wear the Special Warfare insignia. In 2003, Byers attended the Special Operations Combat Medic course. He was assigned to his first SEAL team in May 2004.

Byers served 11 overseas deployments, including nine combat tours, deploying multiple times to Iraq and Afghanistan. Over the course of those deployments Byers received five Bronze Star Medals with a valor device, and two Purple Hearts.

In December 2014, General Martin Dempsey "strongly recommended" Byers for the Medal of Honor. On February 29, 2016, President Barack Obama presented the Medal of Honor to Byers during a ceremony at the White House. Byers is the sixth SEAL to receive the Medal of Honor. Byers was assigned to Naval Special Warfare Development Group, also known as SEAL Team Six, when he was presented the Medal of Honor. Byers is the first member of the unit to receive the Medal of Honor for an action as a unit member. The next month, Byers requested to return to his SEAL team.

In November 2017, Byers was inducted into the Ohio Veterans Hall of Fame. In August 2017, Byers joined fellow Medal of Honor recipient Hershel W. Williams at the launching ceremony for a ship named after Williams. In May 2018, Byers was selected for promotion to master chief petty officer; during that same month Byers was in attendance when Master Chief Special Warfare Operator Britt Slabinski was presented with his Medal of Honor. By July 2018, Byers had received his promotion to master chief.

=== Medal of Honor action ===
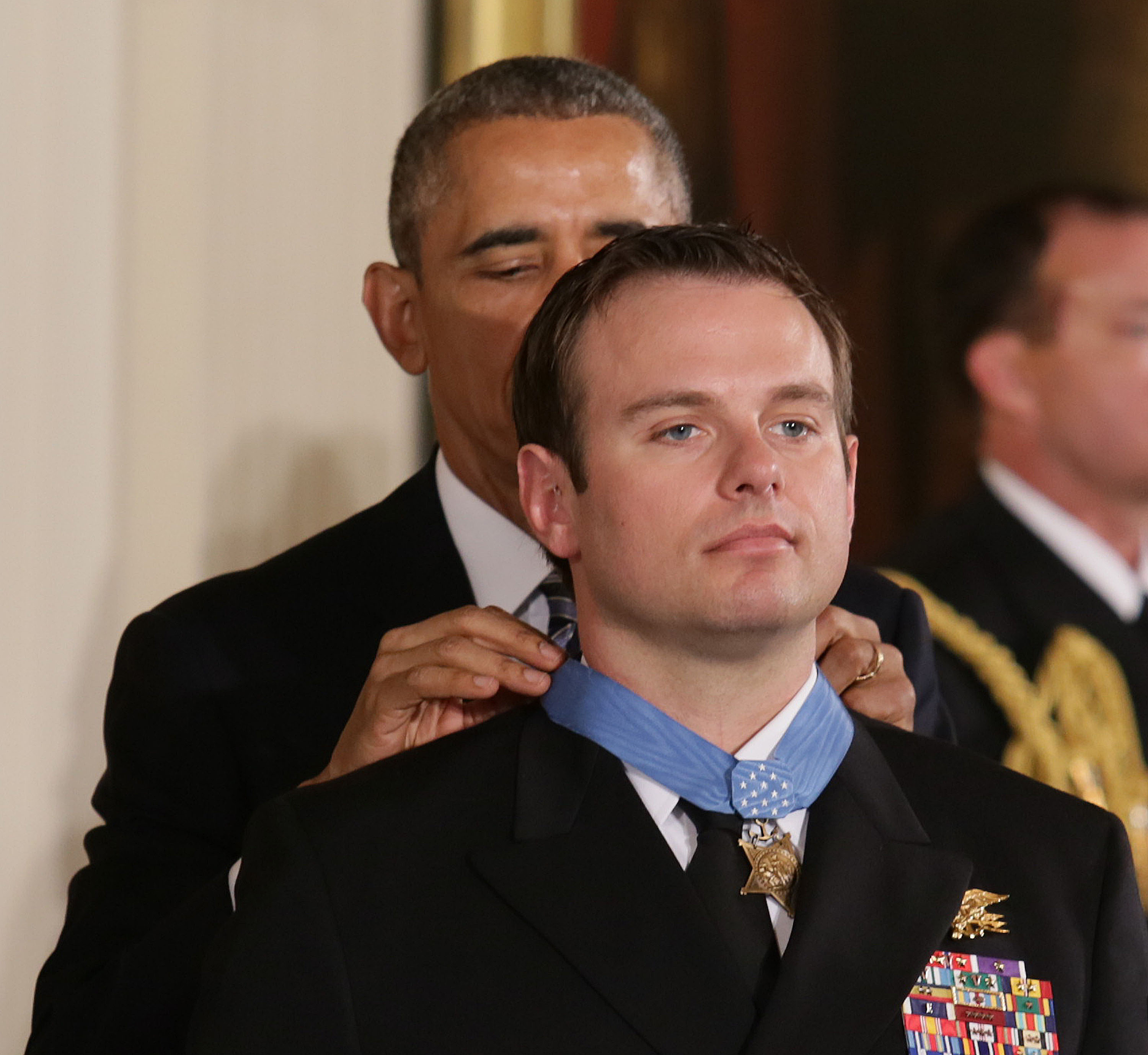
Byers receiving the Medal of Honor from U.S. President Barack Obama, 2016.

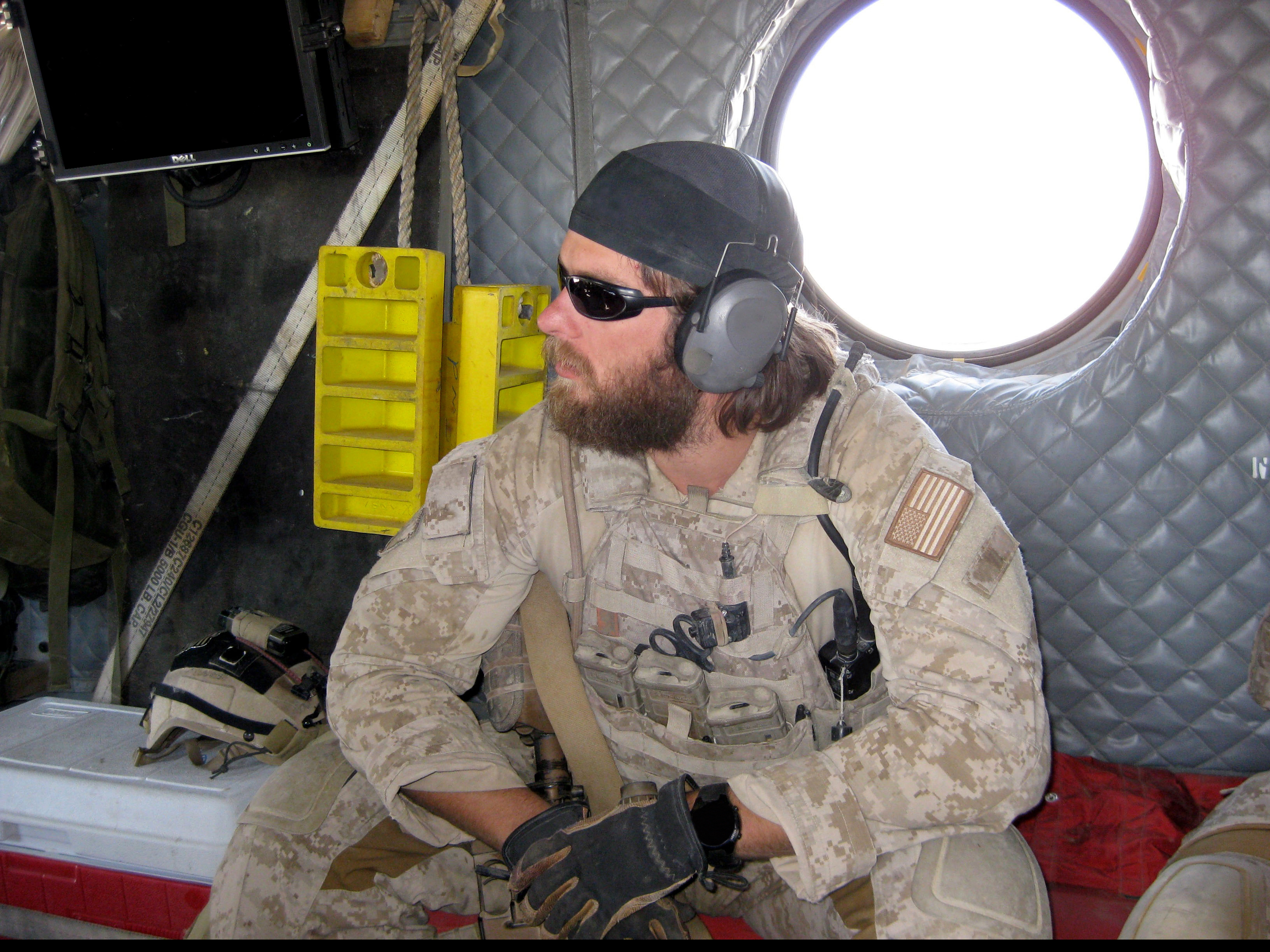
Byers in Afghanistan.

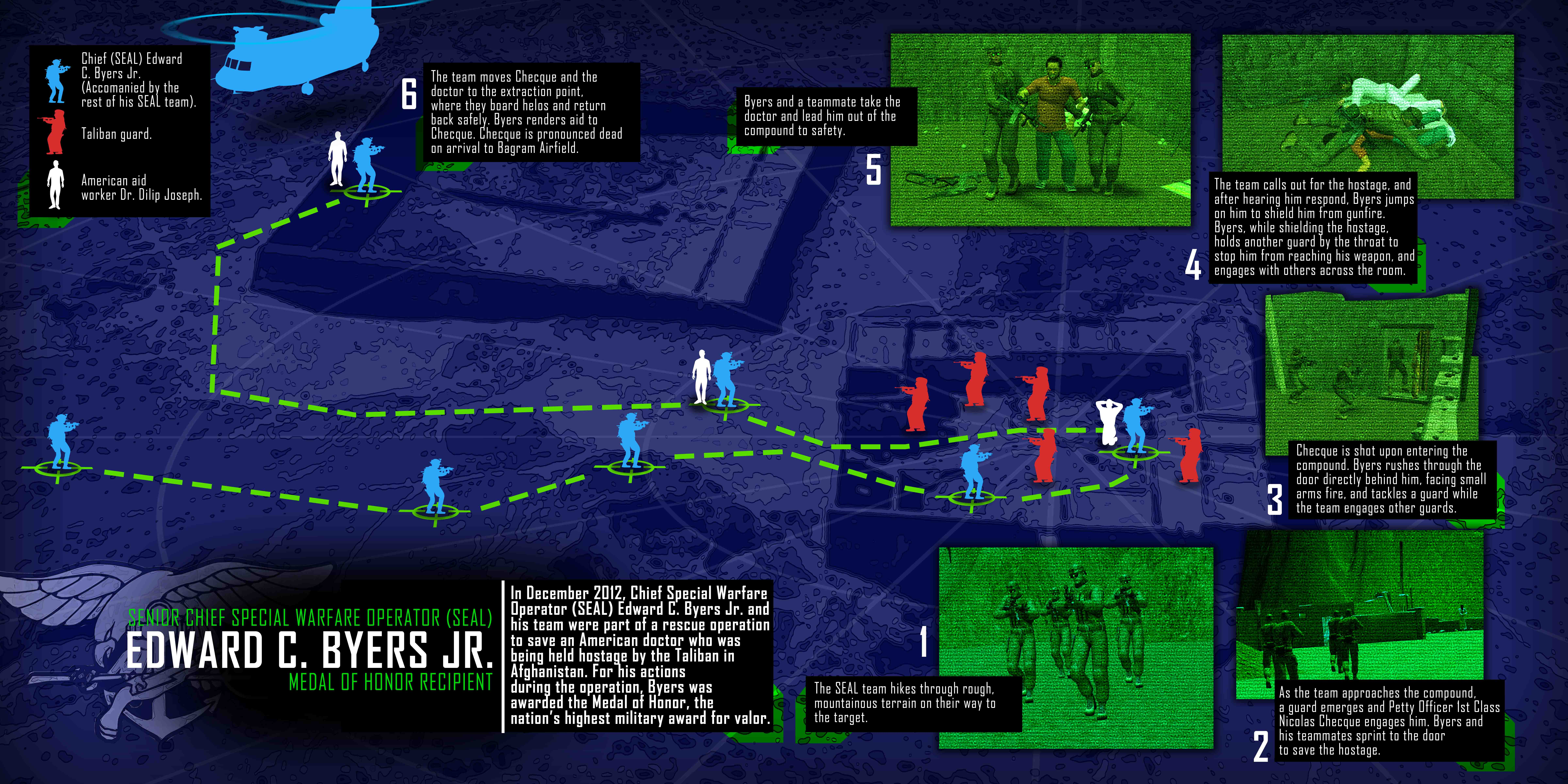
An Infographic depicting the December 2012 Rescue Operation.

On December 5, 2012, American physician Dr. Dilip Joseph, who had been working with an aid organization, was captured by the Taliban along with two Afghans while returning to their base in Kabul. The U.S. military gathered intelligence on where Dr. Joseph was being held. The commanders were concerned that the hostages might be moved to a new hideout or killed as early as December 9, 2012.

On the night of December 8, 2012, Byers and his unit were inserted by helicopter in Qarghah'i District of Laghman Province, eastern Afghanistan. They hiked more than four hours over difficult terrain to reach the compound where the Taliban were holding the hostages. Despite the darkness, an armed guard spotted the SEALs within roughly 75 feet (23 m) of the compound and raised an alarm. Petty Officer 1st Class Nicolas D. Checque sprinted forward, killed the guard and entered the compound, with Byers just steps behind.

Once inside the compound, Checque was shot by a Taliban fighter from within the single room where the hostages were held. Undeterred, Byers burst into the room, shooting dead an armed Taliban fighter. Byers tackled and straddled another insurgent who was scrambling to the corner of the room to get a rifle. Byers adjusted his night vision goggles to see where the American hostage was. When Joseph called out to Byers, Byers killed the insurgent he was straddling and then hurled himself on top of Joseph to protect him from harm. At the same time, Byers pinned another militant to the wall with a hand to the throat until another SEAL shot him.

Byers, the unit's medic, attempted to resuscitate Checque on the ground and during a 40-minute flight to Bagram Airfield without success. Checque was posthumously awarded the Navy Cross for his actions.

==== Citation ====
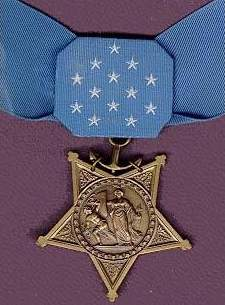

For conspicuous gallantry and intrepidity at the risk of his life above and beyond the call of duty as a Hostage Rescue Force Team Member in Afghanistan in support of Operation ENDURING FREEDOM from 8 to 9 December 2012. As the rescue force approached the target building, an enemy sentry detected them and darted inside to alert his fellow captors. The sentry quickly reemerged, and the lead assaulter attempted to neutralize him. Chief Byers with his team sprinted to the door of the target building. As the primary breacher, Chief Byers stood in the doorway fully exposed to enemy fire while ripping down six layers of heavy blankets fastened to the inside ceiling and walls to clear a path for the rescue force. The first assaulter pushed his way through the blankets, and was mortally wounded by enemy small arms fire from within. Chief Byers, completely aware of the imminent threat, fearlessly rushed into the room and engaged an enemy guard aiming an AK-47 at him. He then tackled another adult male who had darted towards the corner of the room. During the ensuing hand-to-hand struggle, Chief Byers confirmed the man was not the hostage and engaged him. As other rescue team members called out to the hostage, Chief Byers heard a voice respond in English and raced toward it. He jumped atop the American hostage and shielded him from the high volume of fire within the small room. While covering the hostage with his body, Chief Byers immobilized another guard with his bare hands, and restrained the guard until a teammate could eliminate him. His bold and decisive actions under fire saved the lives of the hostage and several of his teammates. By his undaunted courage, intrepid fighting spirit, and unwavering devotion to duty in the face of near certain death, Chief Petty Officer Byers reflected great credit upon himself and upheld the highest traditions of the United States Naval Service.

== Awards and decorations ==
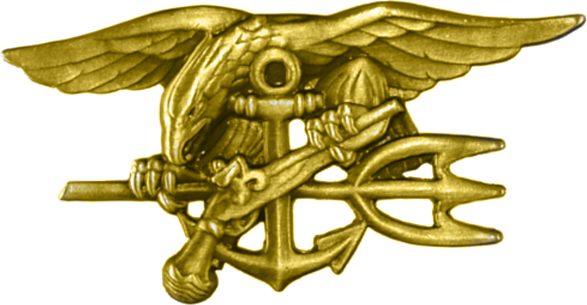

Badge	Special Warfare Insignia		
1st row	Medal of Honor		
2nd row	Bronze Star Medal w/ Combat "V" device and four Gold 5/16 inch award stars	Purple Heart with one 5/16 inch award star	Meritorious Service Medal
3rd row	Joint Service Commendation Medal w/ Combat "V" device	Navy and Marine Corps Commendation Medal w/ Combat "V" device and two 5/16 inch award stars (one award for Combat Valor)	Combat Action Ribbon w/ two 5/16 inch award stars
4th row	Presidential Unit Citation with two bronze 3/16 service stars	Joint Meritorious Unit Award with one bronze oak leaf cluster	Navy Unit Commendation
5th row	Battle "E" award	Navy Good Conduct Medal with four bronze 3/16 service stars	Fleet Marine Force Ribbon
6th row	National Defense Service Medal	Afghanistan Campaign Medal with three 3/16 service stars	Iraq Campaign Medal with two 3/16 service stars
7th row	Global War on Terrorism Expeditionary Medal	Global War on Terrorism Service Medal	Sea Service Deployment Ribbon with 1 silver and 2 bronze 3/16 service stars
8th row	NATO Medal (ISAF)	Navy Rifle Marksmanship Medal	Navy Pistol Marksmanship Medal
Badge	Naval Parachutist Badge		

- 5 gold Service stripes.

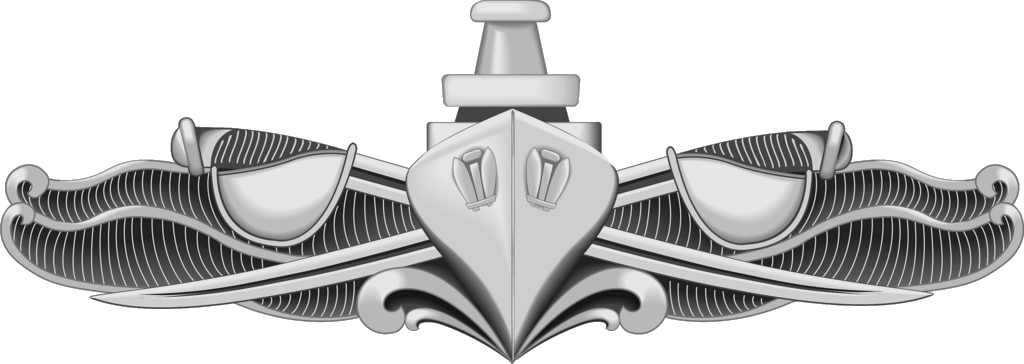
While deployed with the 26th MEU, he earned the Surface Warfare Enlisted badge and the Fleet Marine Force Enlisted Warfare Specialist device.

== Personal life ==
Byers is a licensed paramedic and attended Norwich University in Northfield, Vermont, finishing his education to receive a Bachelor of Science degree in strategic studies and defense analysis. Byers graduated from Norwich University and is documented as being part of the College of Graduate and Continuing Studies Class of 2016. In February 2017, as a guest of Bob Latta, Byers attended joint session of congress. In May 2017, Byers was an "honored guest" at a SEAL Family Foundation fundraiser in Rancho Santa Fe, California; later that year, he was inducted into the Ohio Military Veterans Hall of Fame. In 2018, Byers announced the creation of a new award, named after himself, at Otsego High School.

In 2021, Byers earned a Master of Business Administration at the Wharton School of the University of Pennsylvania.

Byers is married to Madison and they have one daughter, Hannah.

In October 2024, Byers joined 15 other Medal of Honor recipients in publicly endorsing Donald Trump for president.

== See also ==
- List of post-Vietnam War Medal of Honor recipients
- List of United States Navy SEALs
