= Embedded Training Teams =

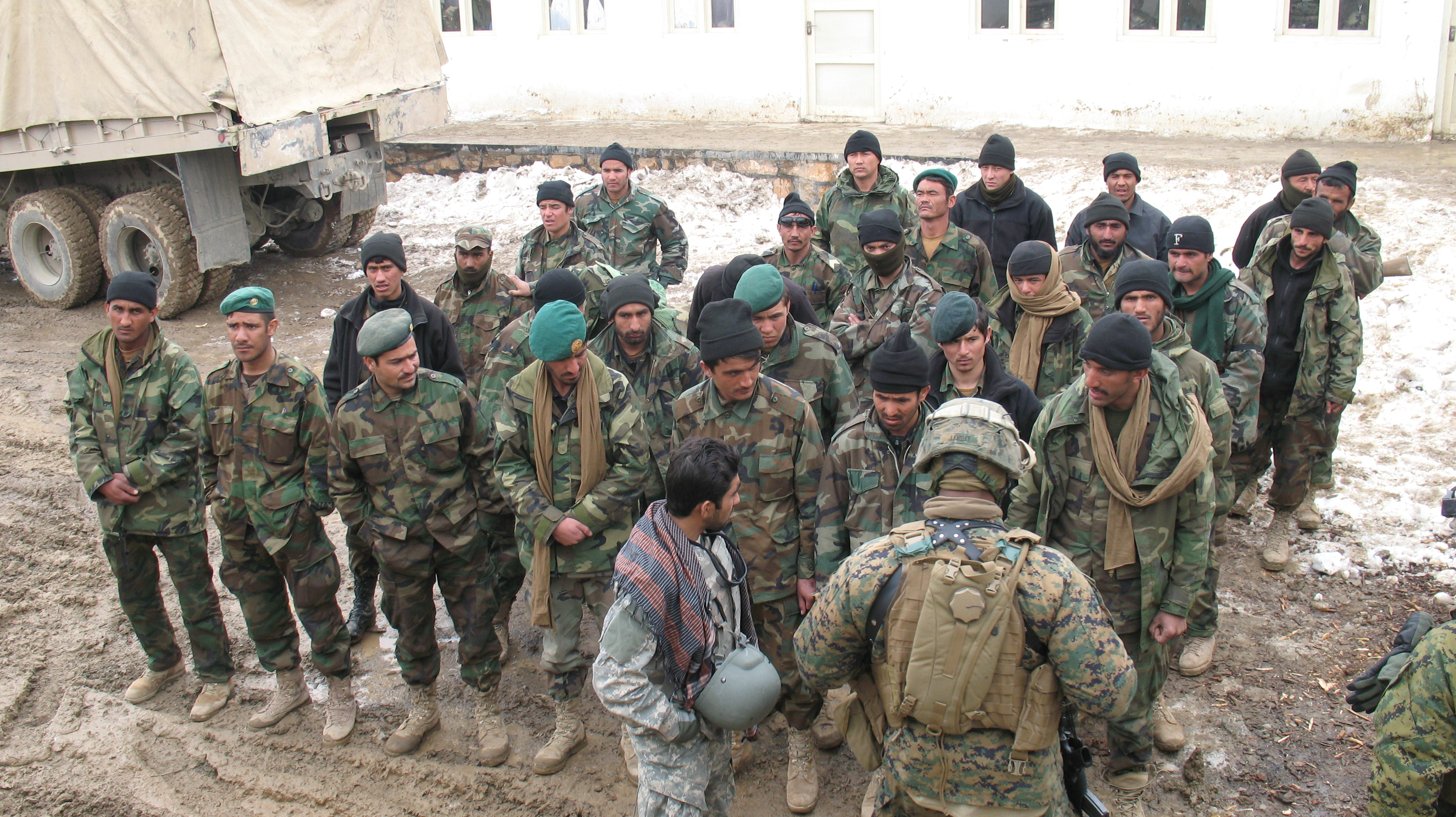
ETT Commander inspects ANA March 2009

Embedded Training Teams or ETT is the term used by the US military since 2003 to describe conventional forces used to train and mentor Afghan forces (ANA and ANP primarily). They were formed in 2003 under Task Force Phoenix. Although ETT refers to the Embedded Training "Team", members of the team itself commonly refer to themselves as "ETTs"

== Task Force Phoenix ==
Task Force Phoenix or Combined Joint Task Force Phoenix or CJTF Phoenix (its official name) was organized in April 2003 and established the first ETTs to train and mentor the Afghan National Security Forces (ANSF).

== Mission ==
ETTs and their coalition partnered Operational and Mentoring Liaison Teams (OMLTs) supported by contractors, mentor the ANA in leadership, staff support functions, planning, assessing, supporting, and execution of operations and training to include doctrine development. In addition to training and mentoring the ANA the ETTs and OMLTs provide the ANA access to combat enablers such as close air support/fires, medical evacuation, and quick reaction. According to the CJTFP Public Affairs Office, Coalition Forces have assisted in training and equipping nearly 35,000 Afghanistan National Army (ANA) Soldiers. ANA personnel receive mentoring and training in the field that is administered by Coalition forces in their respective Corps area of operations. Throughout the entire training and deployment process, ETTs and OMLTs work closely with afghans to maintain standards established by CSTC-A, to ensure a high level of professionalism, and to provide the ANA experience working with combat enablers, such as close air support/fires, medical evacuation and quick reaction forces.

== Types and categories ==
Originally ETTs were divided into four groups, advising in the areas of intelligence, communications, fire support, logistics and infantry tactics:

- Training Assistance Group (TAG): Oversees doctrine and training at Kabul Military Training Center.
- Regional Corps Advisory Command (RCAC): Mentors operational ANA Regional Corps staffs.
- Brigade Training Teams (BTT): Mentors Brigade command and staff at Brigade and Kandak (Battalion) level during training and deployment.
- Mobile Training Teams (MTT): Specific equipment training once recruits report to their Brigade. Many of these MTTs were sourced/filled by contractors and supervised by ETTs.
  - Contracted trainers, mostly former law enforcement and military, contributed greatly to the ETT mission.
  - Partnered OMLTs are the international (non-U.S.) equivalent of ETTs deployed under the NATO International Security Assistance Force ("ISAF"). They are fielded by other Coalition/Partner countries in Afghanistan to assist in the training of the ANA. The following coalition partners provide OMLTs: France, Germany, Spain, Romania, United Kingdom, Australia, Netherlands, Belgium, Canada, Czech Republic, Croatia, Italy, Sweden, Finland, Norway, Slovenia, Poland, Hungary, Bulgaria, Serbia and Macedonia.

== Selection ==
Unlike their Special Forces counterparts in the past, ETTs are normally Officers and Senior NCOs drawn from conventional forces and from wide variety of backgrounds and Military Occupational Specialties who are selected due to their experience as professional soldiers and Marines.

== Composition ==
The composition of an Embedded Training Team ranges from a single Officer paired with a single NCO mentoring a Company or Kandak of ANA, up to a mixed team of 20 Officers and SNCO/NCOs led by a Colonel mentoring a Brigade or Corps.

== Training ==
Since October 2006, the U.S. Army's 1st Infantry Division, based at Fort Riley, Kansas, was responsible for training all transition teams for service in Iraq and Afghanistan. Previously, advisor teams had been trained at several U.S. Army installations, most notably Fort Carson, Colorado; Camp Atterbury, Indiana; Fort Hood, Texas; and Camp Shelby, Mississippi. However, in early 2006, the U.S. Army decided to consolidate all training at Fort Riley in order to standardize and improve training for that critical mission. The Marines Corps initially coordinated all ETT training through the SCETC (Security Cooperation Education and Training Center) in Quantico Virginia and later, in 2008, SCETC established the Advisor Training Group in Twentynine Palms California. Additionally, the Marine ETTs assigned to the 201st Corps in RC east (2003–2010), went through a rigorous mountain warfare training program at the Mountain Warfare Training Center in Bridgeport California known as Mountain Viper.

== Medals of Honor ==
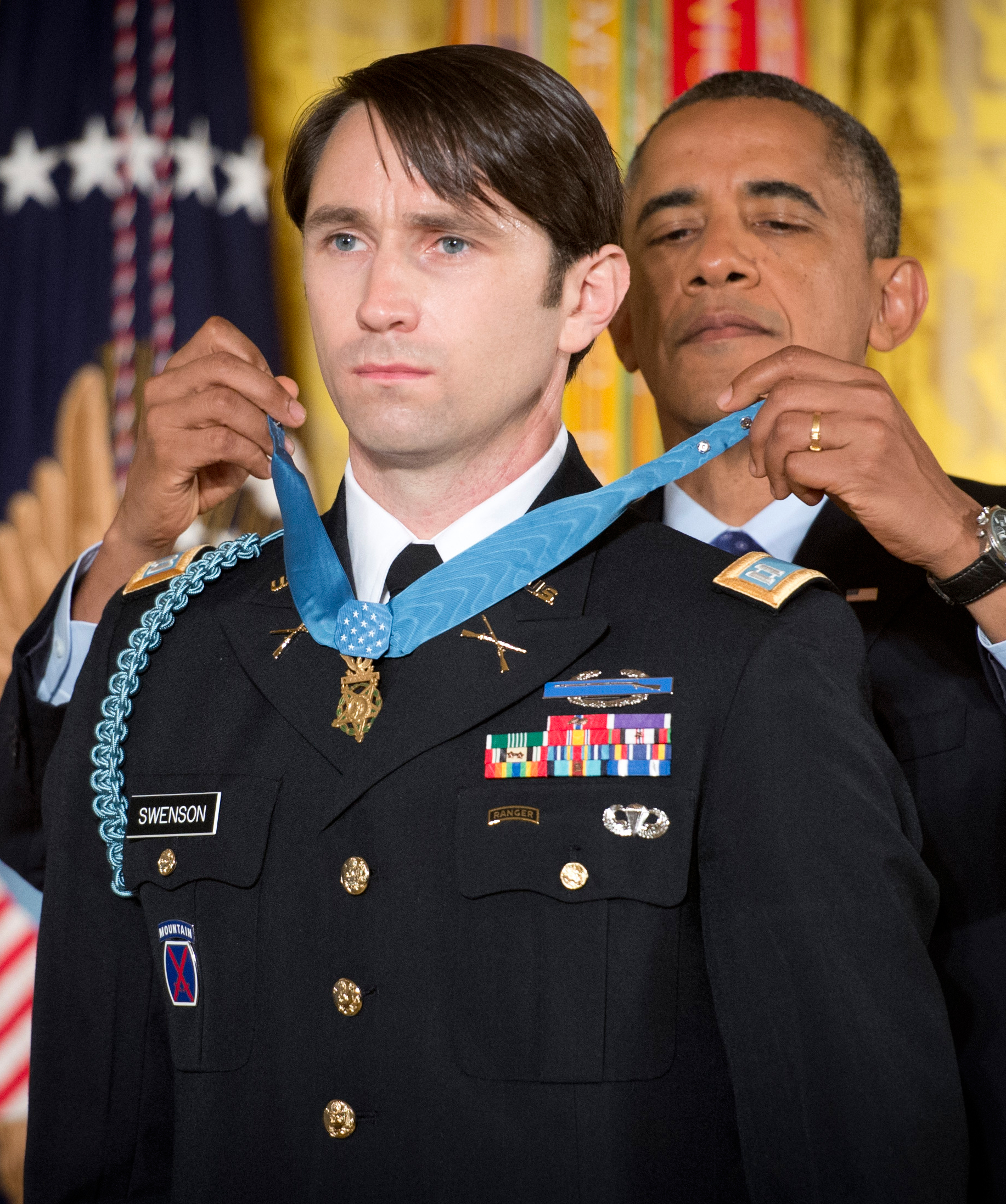
ETT Captain William Swenson receiving the Medal of Honor

While serving as ETTs in Kunar Province, Captain William D. Swenson (Army) and Corporal Dakota Meyer (Marine) were awarded the Medal of Honor for their actions during the Battle of Ganjgal.

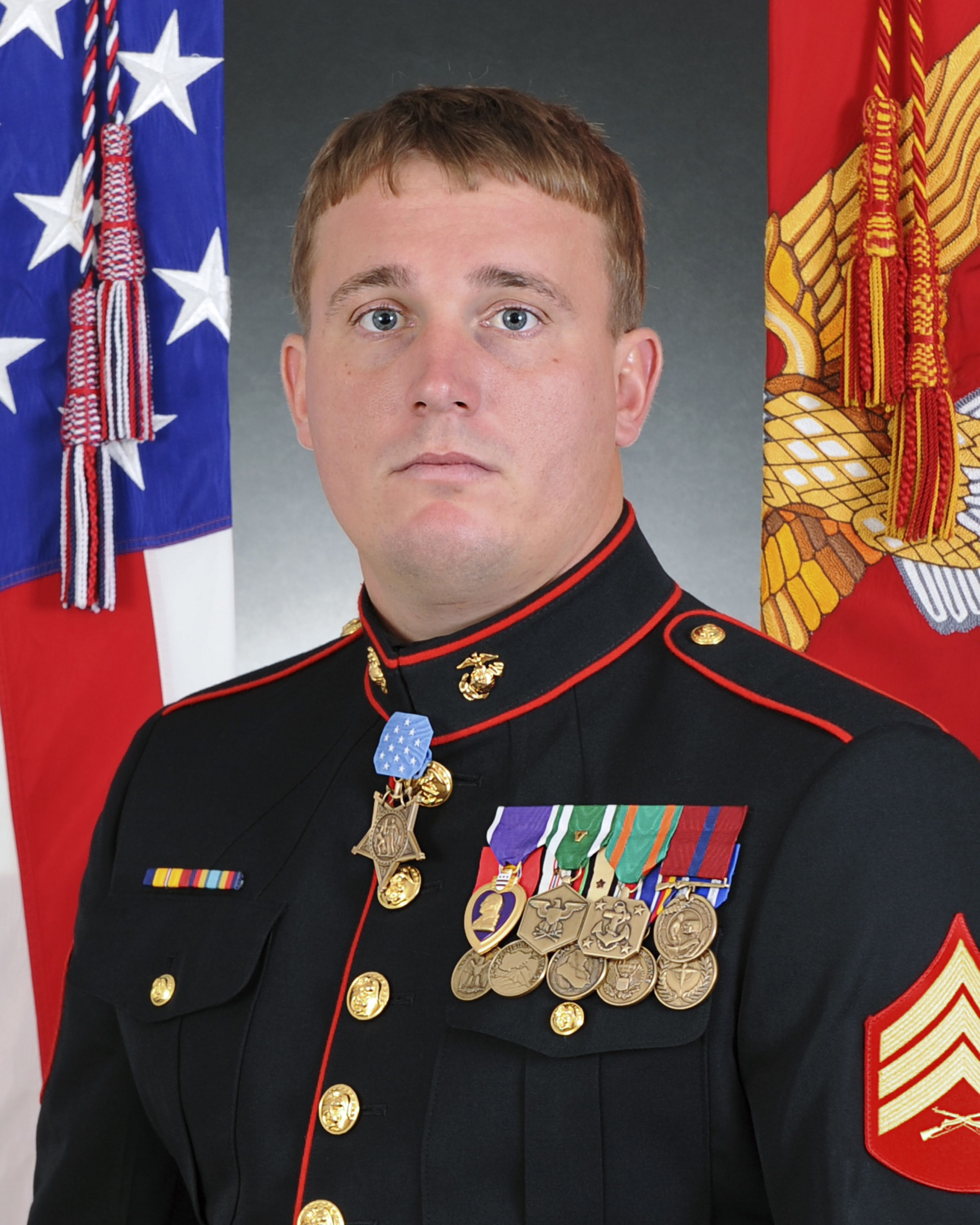
ETT Dakota L. Meyer

- Corporal Dakota Meyer is the first living Marine to receive the Medal of Honor since the Vietnam War
- Captain William D. Swenson is the fifth living Soldier to receive the Medal of Honor since the Vietnam War
- Two other Marine ETTs in the battle, Staff Sgt. Juan Rodriguez-Chavez and Capt. Ademola Fabayo, received the Navy Cross.

== Notes ==
https://www.amazon.com/dp/B005788GNI/ref=dp-kindle-redirect?_encoding=UTF8&btkr=1
