= Dakota Meyer =

U.S. Marine Medal of Honor recipient

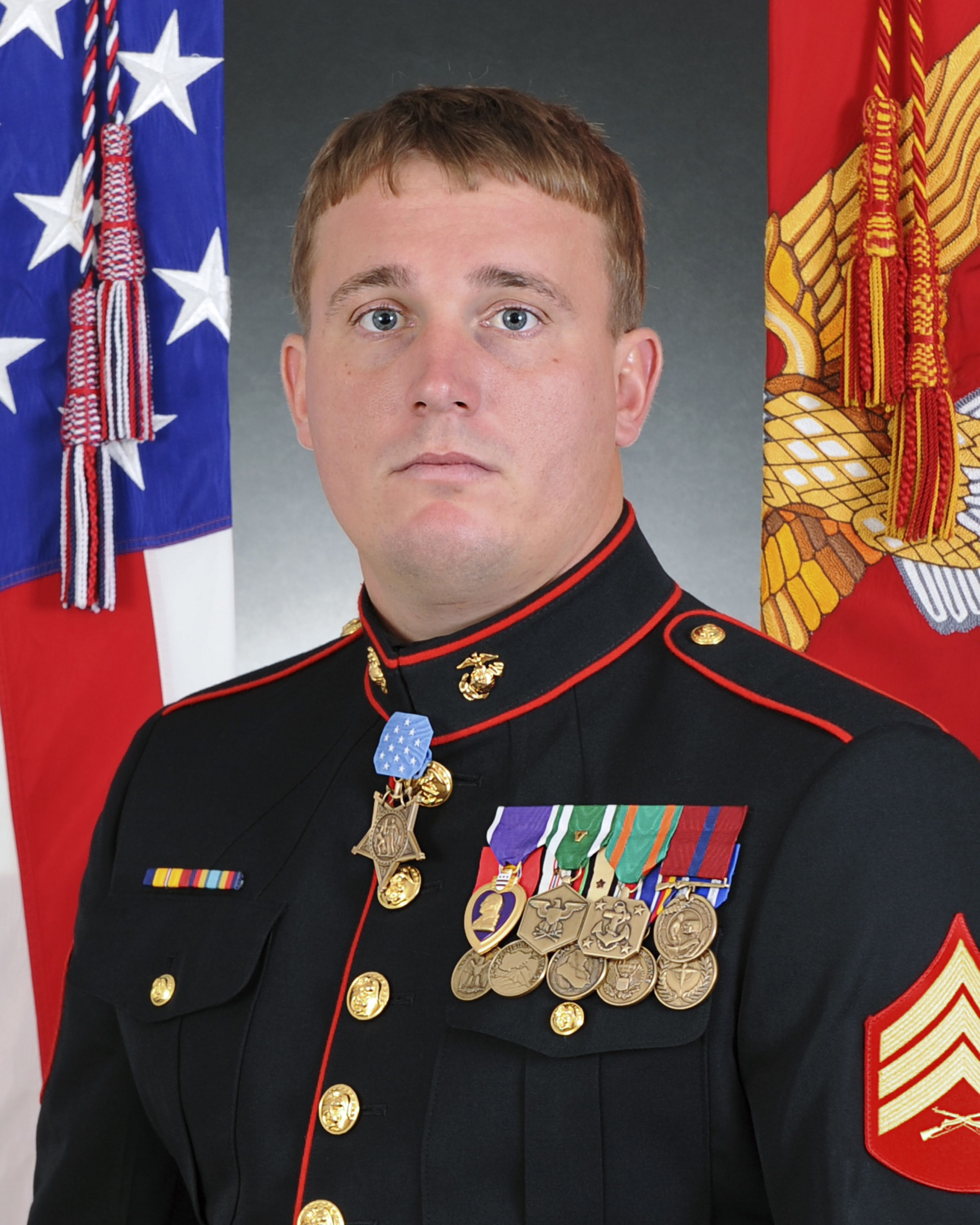
- Meyer in 2011
- Born: Dakota Louis Meyer; June 26, 1988 (age 38); Columbia, Kentucky, U.S.
- Spouses: Cassandra Wain (m. 2008; div. 2010) Bristol Palin (m. 2016; div. 2018)
- Children: 2
- Military career
- Allegiance: United States
- Branch: United States Marine Corps, United States Marine Corps Reserve
- Service years: 2006–2010; 2025–Present
- Rank: Sergeant
- Units: Embedded Training Team 2-8; 3rd Battalion, 3rd Marines
- Conflicts: Iraq War; War in Afghanistan: Battle of Ganjgal
- Awards: Medal of Honor; Purple Heart; Navy and Marine Corps Commendation Medal; Navy and Marine Corps Achievement Medal
- Other work: Veterans advocate

Dakota Louis Meyer (born June 26, 1988) is a United States Marine serving with the United States Marine Corps Reserve. A veteran of the war in Afghanistan, he was awarded the Medal of Honor for his actions during the Battle of Ganjgal on September 8, 2009, in Kunar Province, Afghanistan. Meyer is the second-youngest living Medal of Honor recipient, the third living recipient for either the Iraq War or the war in Afghanistan, and the first living United States Marine in 38 years to be honored.

== Early life and education ==
Meyer was born and grew up in Columbia, Kentucky, the son of Felicia Carole Ferree "Killy" Gilliam and Michael Allen Meyer.

In 2006, Dakota Meyer graduated from Green County High School. While at Green County High School he had walked up to a recruiting United States Marine Corps sergeant visiting from about an hour's drive away. The sergeant was sitting in the school's lunchroom and asked him what he planned to do after high school. Meyer told the recruiter, "I'm going to go to college and play college football." The Marine sergeant said that he would do the same thing if he was Meyer because there was no way that he could become a Marine.

After first walking off, Meyer came back five minutes later with his answer, "If you pack up your stuff right now I'll go sign the papers." He enlisted in the United States Marine Corps at a recruiting station in Louisville, Kentucky, and went to boot camp at Parris Island.

== Military service ==
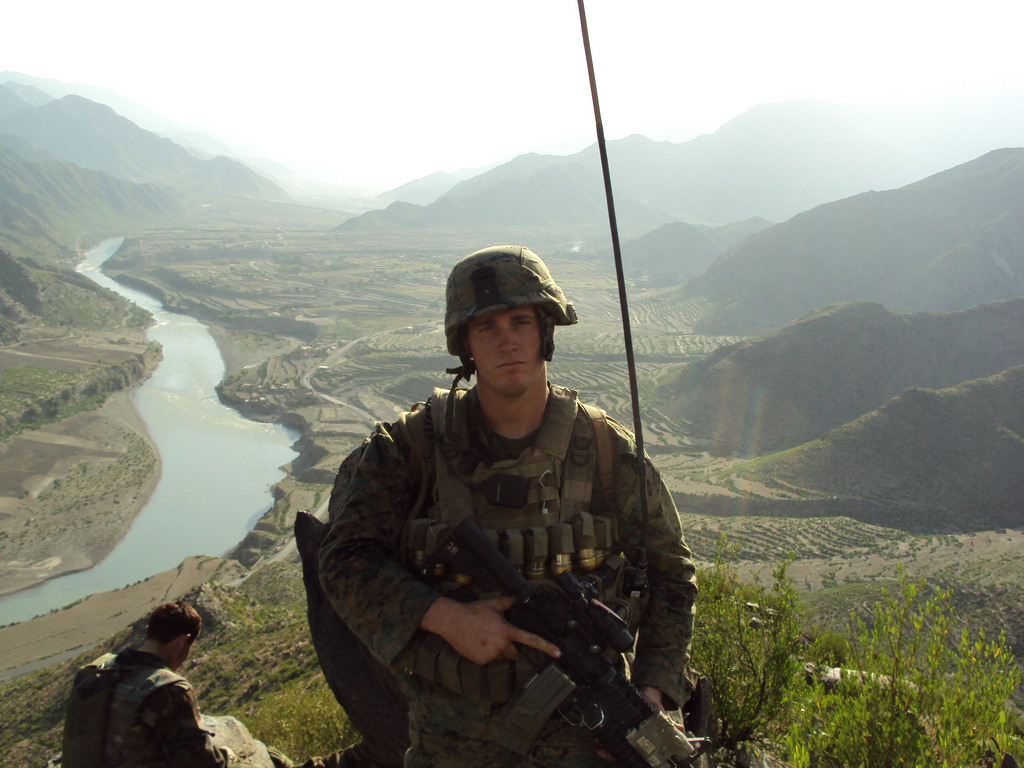
Meyer in Afghanistan

Meyer deployed to Fallujah, Iraq, in 2007 as a scout sniper with 3rd Battalion, 3rd Marines. He gained national attention for his actions in Afghanistan during his second deployment in Kunar Province with Embedded Training Team 2–8.

On September 8, 2009, near the village of Ganjgal, Meyer was told that three Marines and a Navy Corpsman, who were members of Meyer's squad as well as his friends, were missing after being ambushed by a group of insurgents. Under enemy fire, Meyer entered an area known to be inhabited by insurgents and eventually found the four missing servicemen dead and stripped of their weapons, body armor, and radios. There he saw a Taliban fighter trying to take the bodies. The fighter tackled Meyer, and after a brief scuffle, Meyer grabbed a baseball-sized rock and beat the fighter to death. With the help of Afghan soldiers, he moved the bodies to a safer area where they could be extracted. Meyer "killed at least eight Taliban, personally evacuated 12 friendly wounded, and provided cover for another 24 Marines and soldiers to escape likely death at the hands of a numerically superior and determined foe."

Four U.S. servicemen died in the ambush:

- 1st Lt. Michael Johnson, 25, of Virginia Beach, Virginia
- Gunnery Sgt. Aaron Kenefick, 30, of Roswell, Georgia
- Gunnery Sgt. Edwin Wayne Johnson Jr., 31, of Columbus, Georgia
- Hospital Corpsman Third Class James R. Layton, 22, of Riverbank, California.

A fifth man, Army SFC Kenneth W. Westbrook, 41, of Shiprock, New Mexico, later died from his wounds.

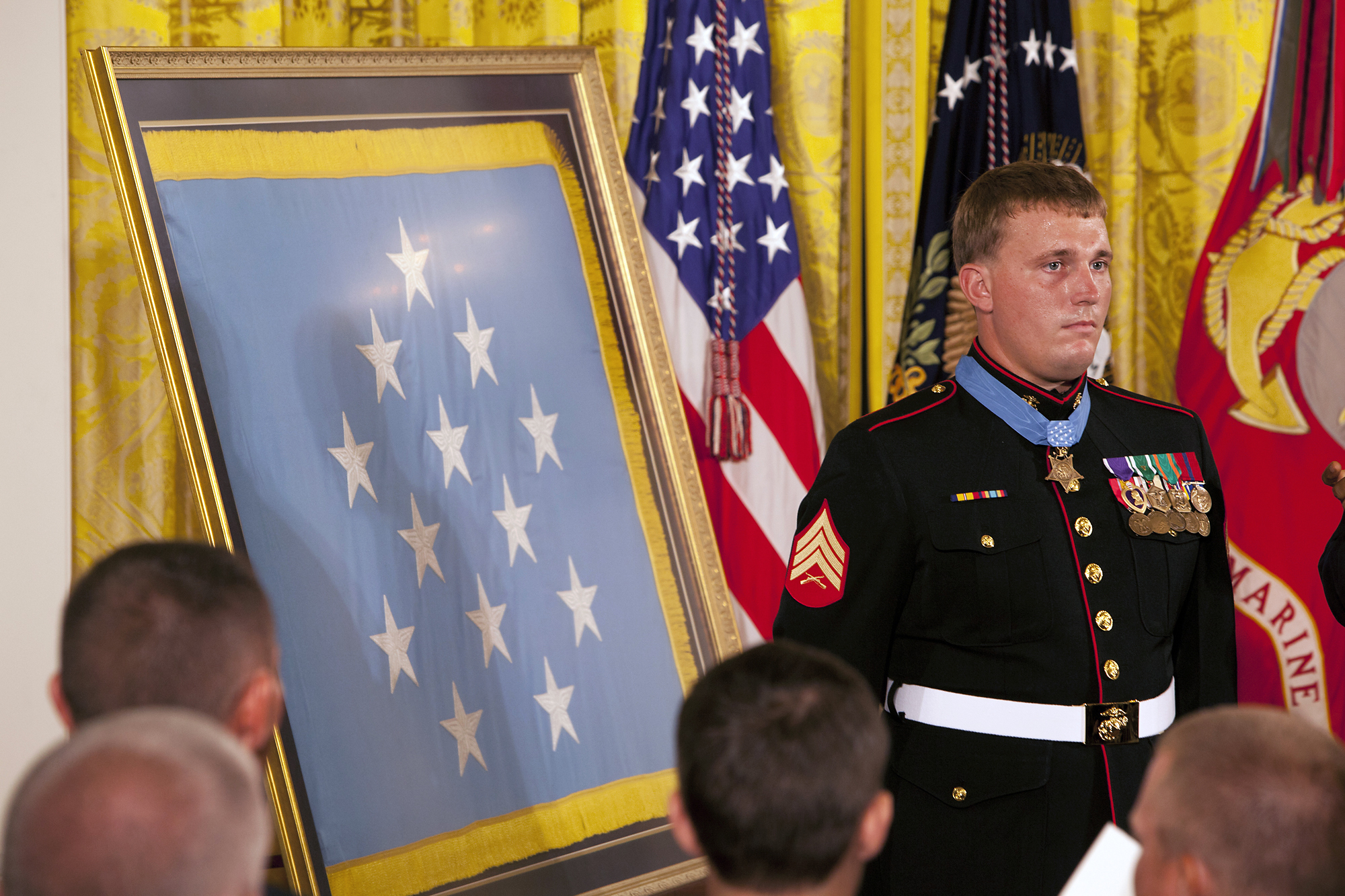
Meyer stands at attention after receiving the Medal of Honor from U.S. president Barack Obama during the Medal of Honor presentation ceremony in the East Room of the White House, Washington, D.C., September 15, 2011.

On November 6, 2010, the commandant of the Marine Corps, General James F. Amos, told reporters during a visit to Camp Pendleton, California, that a living United States Marine had been nominated for the Medal of Honor. Two days later, Marine Corps Times, an independent newspaper covering Marine Corps operations, reported that the unnamed person was Meyer, citing anonymous sources. CNN confirmed the story independently two days later.

On June 9, 2011, the Marine Corps announced that two other Marines on Meyer's team in Ganjgal would receive the Navy Cross, the second-highest award for valor a Marine can receive. Capt. Ademola D. Fabayo and Staff Sgt. Juan J. Rodriguez-Chavez were recognized for their roles in retrieving the bodies of the fallen Marines and Corpsman. Before Meyer began searching for the missing servicemen on foot, Rodriguez-Chavez drove a gun truck into the kill zone with Fabayo manning the truck's machine gun.

When President Obama's staff called Meyer to set up a time for the president to inform him that he would be given the Medal of Honor, they were told Meyer was working at his construction job and were asked to call again during his lunch break. He was awarded the Medal of Honor in a ceremony on September 15, 2011. When a White House staffer contacted Meyer to arrange the ceremony, Meyer asked if he could have a beer with the president and President Obama agreed to the request. He received an invitation to the White House to meet Obama in the afternoon before the ceremony. Meyer also requested that when he was honored, simultaneous commemorative services should be held at other associated locations to honor the memory of his colleagues who died or were mortally wounded during the ambush and his rescue attempts.

On April 17, 2025, 15 years after his discharge, Meyer re-enlisted into the Marine Corps Reserve. Meyer is the only Medal of Honor recipient serving in any reserve or National Guard branch. Only one recipient- Chief Warrant Officer Eric Slover- remains on active duty in 2026.

Meyer is now a special assistant to the United States secretary of defense Pete Hegseth. He is classified as a special government employee in his new role while he remains in the Marine Reserve.

== Civilian life ==
A year after the Battle of Ganjgal, after drinking at a friend's house, Meyer attempted suicide using a Glock pistol kept in his truck's glove compartment. The gun was not loaded. He later sought help for post-traumatic stress disorder.

In September 2011, Kentucky Governor Steve Beshear bestowed upon Meyer the honorary title of Kentucky Colonel during an event in his hometown of Greensburg in which Meyer served as grand marshal.

Meyer filed a lawsuit against his former employer, defense contractor BAE Systems, alleging the company and his supervisor punished him for his opposition to a weapons sale to Pakistan. The lawsuit claimed that BAE Systems ridiculed Meyer's Medal of Honor, called him mentally unstable and suggested he had a drinking problem, thereby costing him a job. On December 15, 2011, BAE announced that the parties resolved their dispute out of court.

On December 14, 2011, McClatchy news outlets published an article that questioned the actual number of lives Meyer saved. The article explained that accounts leading to Medal of Honor awards are frequently inaccurate, and that in Meyer's case "crucial parts that the Marine Corps publicized were untrue, unsubstantiated or exaggerated". At the same time, the article emphasized that Meyer "by all accounts deserved his nomination."

Meyer and Bing West wrote the book Into the Fire: A Firsthand Account of the Most Extraordinary Battle in the Afghan War, about the Battle of Ganjgal. It was published on September 25, 2012. In the book, Meyer makes a case for Army Captain William D. Swenson to be awarded the Medal of Honor; Swenson had criticized Army officers at the nearby Forward Operating Base Joyce for not providing fire support, leading to accusations that the paperwork for his Medal of Honor recommendation had been "lost" as punishment. Those same officers were later cited following a military investigation for "negligent" leadership leading "directly to the loss of life" on the battlefield. Swenson was awarded the Medal of Honor on October 15, 2013, over four years after first being recommended for the award.

In 2013, Meyer participated in the fourth season of Maximum Warrior, a TV competition among U.S.-military operators, featuring ten military-inspired challenges. Meyer, eliminated on the eighth episode, "Night Hostage Rescue", airing November 26, 2013, finished in fourth place. As of 2015, Meyer sits on the advisory board for VETPAW, an organization of U.S. military veterans dedicated to protecting African wildlife. In May 2025, Freedom Industries (an online clothing and lifestyle brand) announced his part in leading the rebuild of their brand and operations.

Meyer endorsed Texas Senator Ted Cruz in the 2016 Republican Party presidential primaries.

Meyer is a proponent of legalizing the medical use of cannabis, which he says can help veterans suffering from PTSD while also reducing usage of opioid drugs. In March 2018, Meyer co-authored an op-ed calling for medical cannabis to be legalized in Kentucky.

== Personal life ==
Meyer married Cassandra Marie Wain on May 17, 2008, in Campbellsville, Kentucky. They were divorced in 2010.

On March 13, 2015, Meyer and Bristol Palin got engaged. She is the daughter of former Alaska Governor Sarah Palin. On May 18, the Palin family announced that the May 23 wedding had been called off. On June 25, Bristol announced that she was pregnant for a second time. She gave birth to a daughter on December 23.

On January 6, 2016, People reported that Meyer was the biological father of the child, and that Meyer had filed legal documents asking for joint legal and physical custody of the newborn and child support from Bristol Palin. In March of that year, Palin and Meyer reached an interim joint legal and physical custody agreement. On May 23, exactly one year after they were originally to have wed, Palin and Meyer married. In December, Palin announced that she was expecting her third child, her second with Meyer. On May 8, 2017, she gave birth to a daughter.

On January 29, 2018, Meyer filed for divorce, citing a "conflict of personalities". On August 1, Palin confirmed that her divorce from Meyer was finalized.

== Books ==
- Into the Fire: A Firsthand Account of the Most Extraordinary Battle in the Afghan War
- The Way Forward: Master Life's Toughest Battles and Create Your Lasting Legacy

== Honors and awards ==
=== Military awards ===

| 1st row | Medal of Honor | Purple Heart | Navy and Marine Corps Commendation Medal w/ Combat V | Navy and Marine Corps Achievement Medal |
| 2nd row | Combat Action Ribbon | Marine Corps Good Conduct Medal | National Defense Service Medal | Afghanistan Campaign Medal w/ one bronze campaign star |
| 3rd row | Iraq Campaign Medal w/ one bronze campaign star | Global War on Terrorism Service Medal | Navy Sea Service Deployment Ribbon | NATO Service Medal (ISAF) |
| Badges | Expert marksmanship badge for rifle (3rd award) | | Expert marksmanship badge for pistol (2nd award) | |

| 1 Service stripe |

=== Medal of Honor ===
==== Medal of Honor citation ====
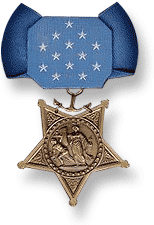

"The President of the United States in the name of The Congress takes pleasure in presenting the MEDAL OF HONOR to

CORPORAL DAKOTA L. MEYER
UNITED STATES MARINE CORPS

For service as set forth in the following:

For conspicuous gallantry and intrepidity at the risk of his life above and beyond the call of duty while serving with Marine Embedded Training Team 2-8, Regional Corps Advisory Command 3-7, in Kunar Province, Afghanistan, on 8 September 2009. Corporal Meyer maintained security at a patrol rally point while other members of his team moved on foot with two platoons of Afghan National Army and Border Police into the village of Ganjgal for a pre-dawn meeting with village elders. Moving into the village, the patrol was ambushed by more than 50 enemy fighters firing rocket propelled grenades, mortars, and machine guns from houses and fortified positions on the slopes above. Hearing over the radio that four U.S. team members were cut off, Corporal Meyer seized the initiative. With a fellow Marine driving, Corporal Meyer took the exposed gunner's position in a gun-truck as they drove down the steeply terraced terrain in a daring attempt to disrupt the enemy attack and locate the trapped U.S. team. Disregarding intense enemy fire now concentrated on their lone vehicle, Corporal Meyer killed a number of enemy fighters with the mounted machine guns and his rifle, some at near point blank range, as he and his driver made three solo trips into the ambush area. During the first two trips, he and his driver evacuated two dozen Afghan soldiers, many of whom were wounded. When one machine gun became inoperable, he directed a return to the rally point to switch to another gun-truck for a third trip into the ambush area where his accurate fire directly supported the remaining U.S. personnel and Afghan soldiers fighting their way out of the ambush. Despite a shrapnel wound to his arm, Corporal Meyer made two more trips into the ambush area in a third gun-truck accompanied by four other Afghan vehicles to recover more wounded Afghan soldiers and search for the missing U.S. team members. Still under heavy enemy fire, he dismounted the vehicle on the fifth trip and moved on foot to locate and recover the bodies of his team members. Meyer's daring initiative and bold fighting spirit throughout the 6-hour battle significantly disrupted the enemy's attack and inspired the members of the combined force to fight on. His unwavering courage and steadfast devotion to his U.S. and Afghan comrades in the face of almost certain death reflected great credit upon himself and upheld the highest traditions of the Marine Corps and the United States Naval Service.

== See also ==
- List of post-Vietnam War Medal of Honor recipients
