= Operational Mentoring and Liaison Team =

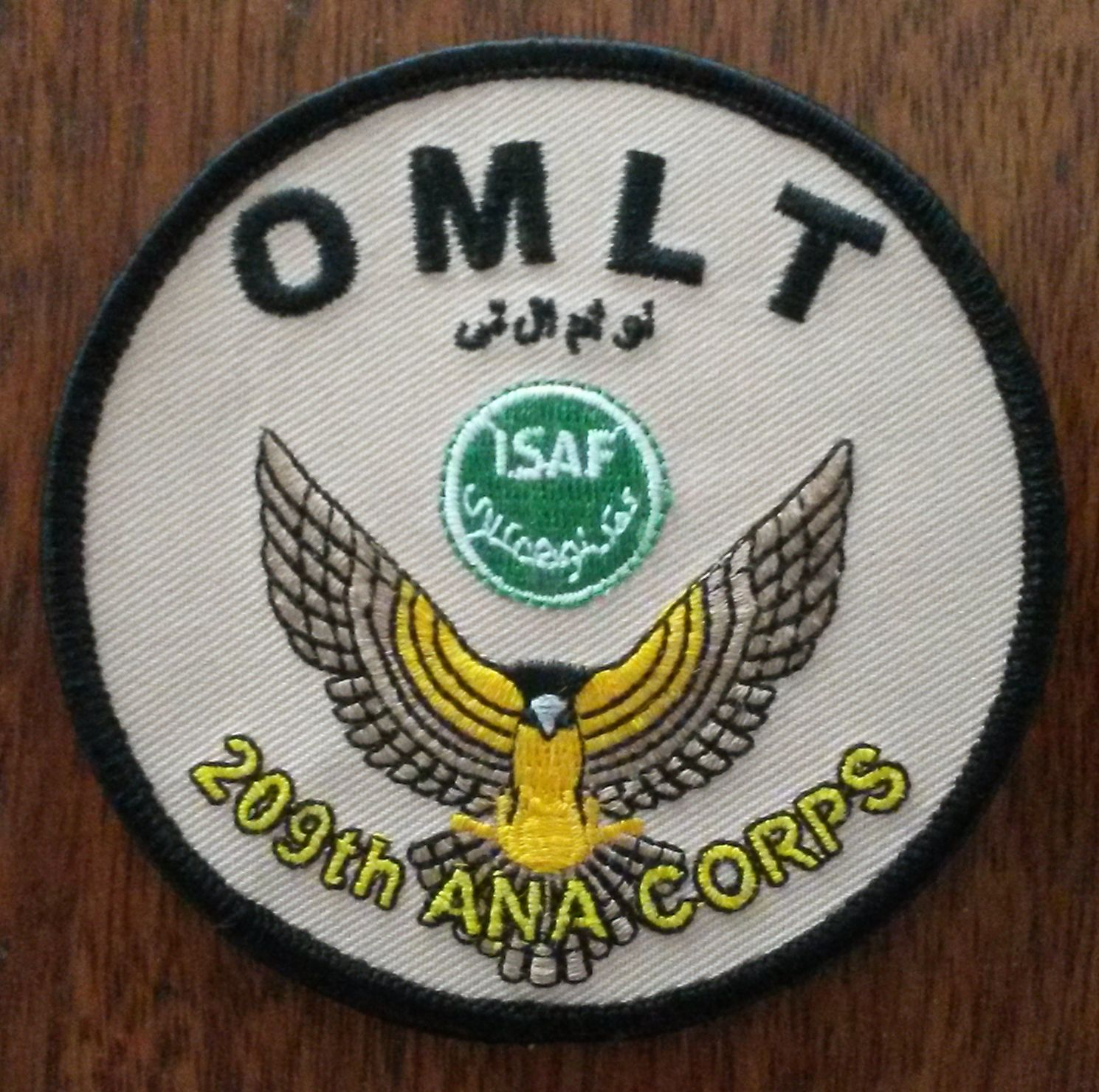
OMLT badge

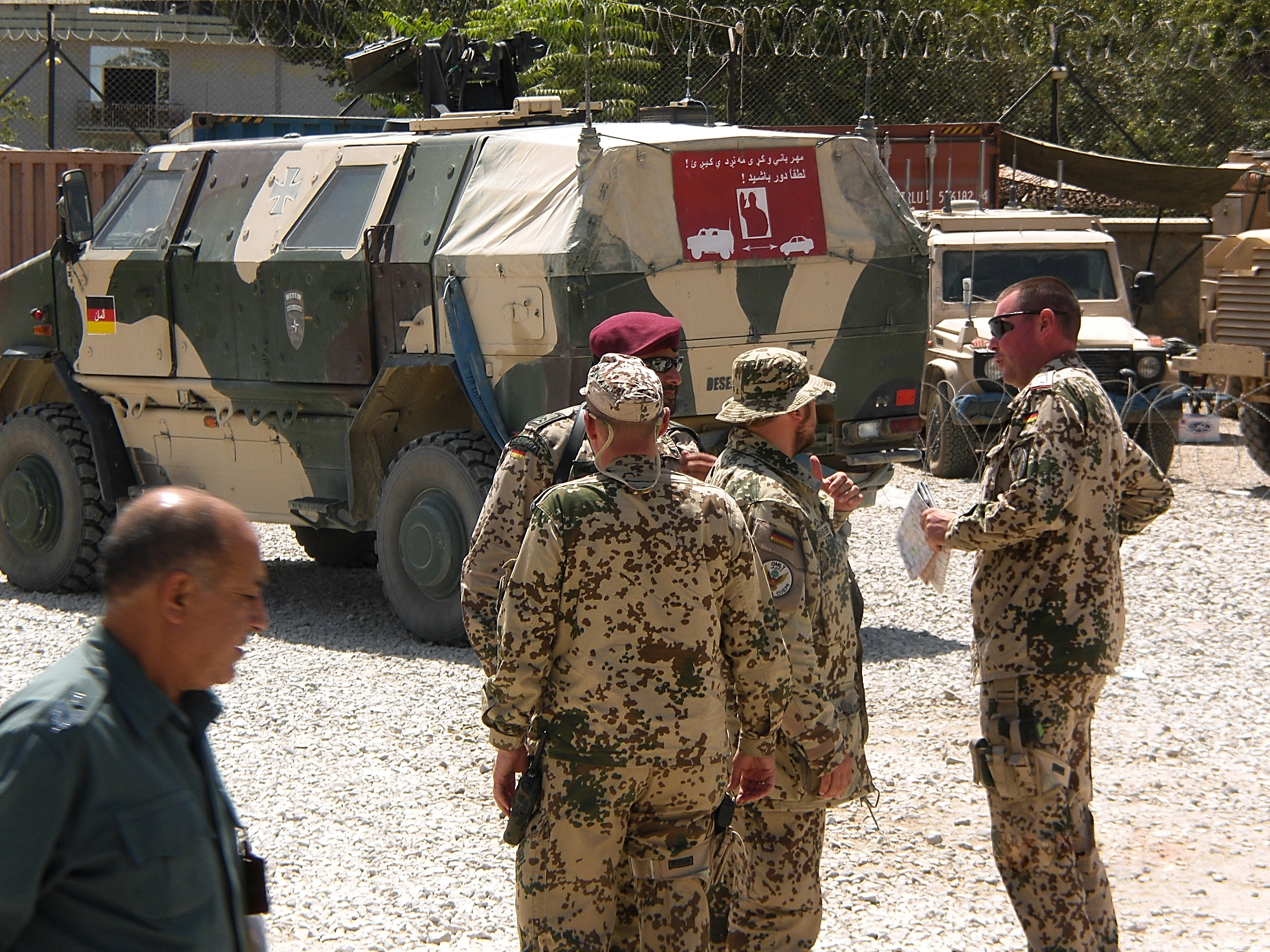
German OMLT soldiers OCCP (Operations Coordination Center-Provincial) Kunduz

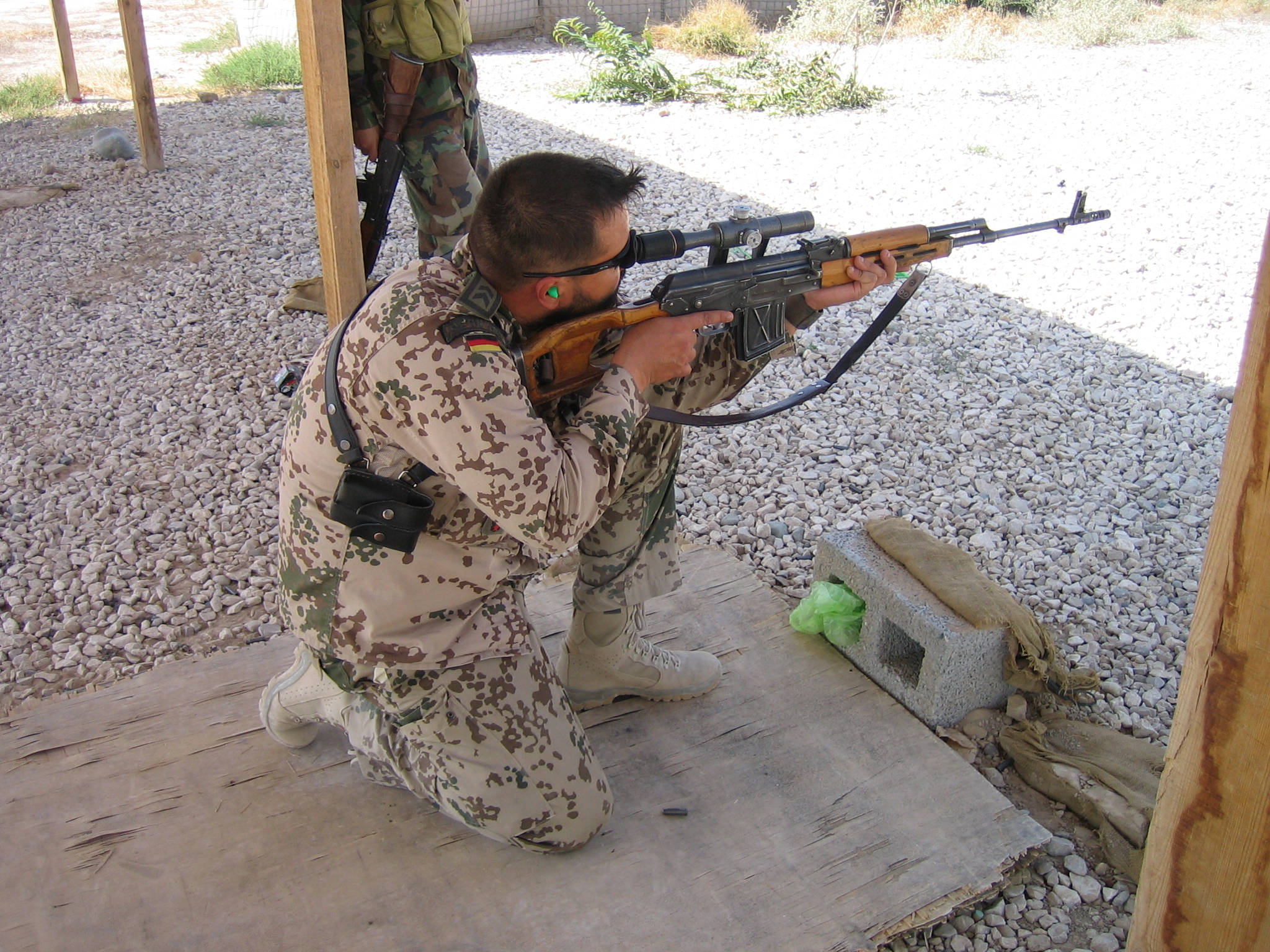
German OMLT-Sniper with Romanian PSL sniper rifle and ANA (Afghan National Army) soldier

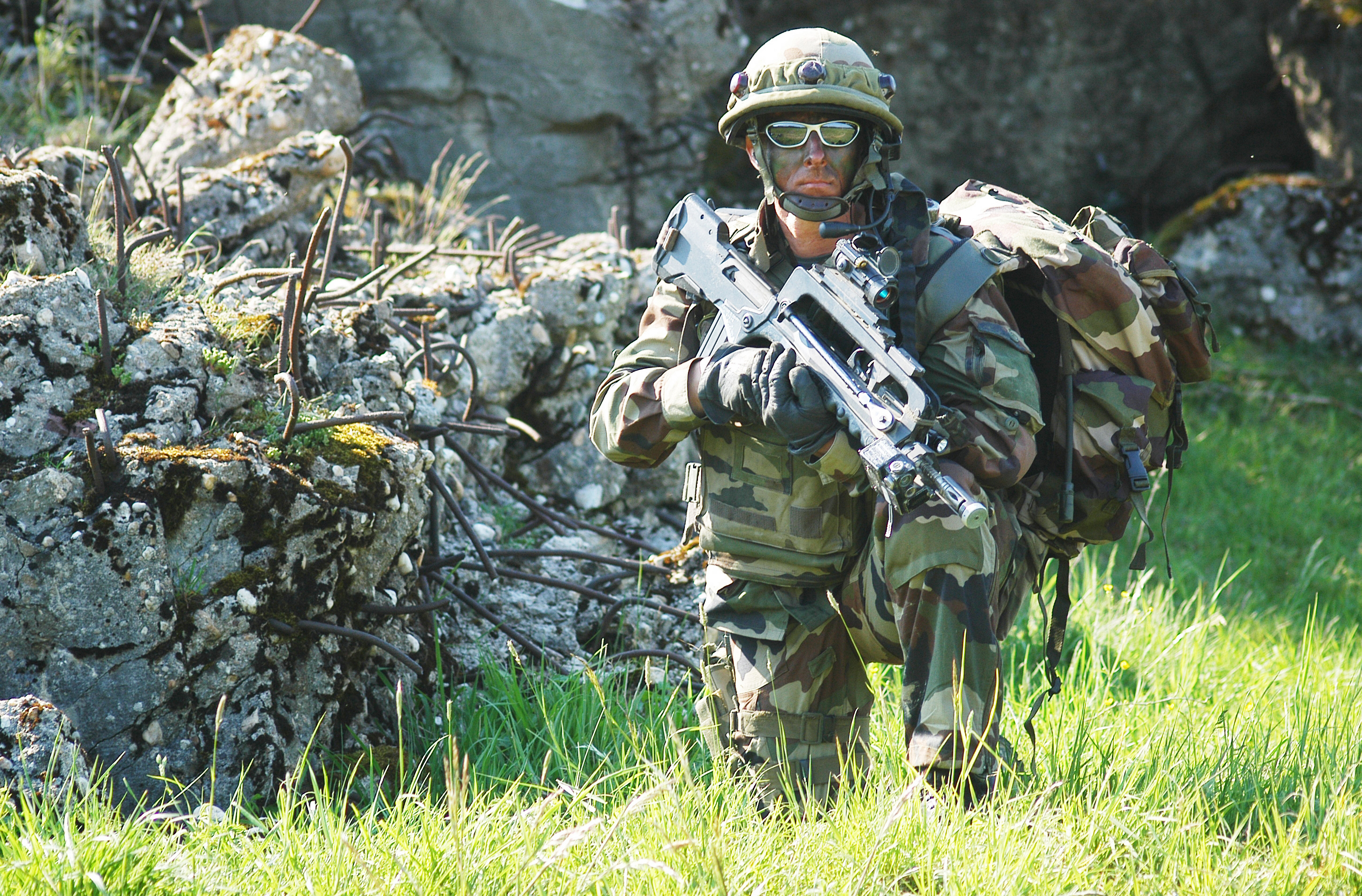
A French soldier stands guard amongst some ruins in the Joint Multinational Readiness Center training area in Hohenfels, Germany, May 14, 2008. The NATO Operational Mentorship and Liaison Team is preparing the soldiers for unit readiness prior to a deployment.

Operational Mentoring and Liaison Teams (OMLTs) were the NATO equivalent of the United States' Embedded Training Teams and were active in Afghanistan.

== Countries ==
Teams from several countries provided training and operational support to the Afghan national forces.

- France
- Germany
- Spain
- Romania
- United Kingdom
- Australia
- Netherlands
- Belgium
- Canada
- Czech Republic
- Croatia
- Italy
- Sweden
- Latvia
- Finland
- Norway
- Slovenia
- Poland
- Hungary
- Bulgaria
- Serbia
- Greece
- North Macedonia
