= Battle of Ganjgal =

Afghanistan war engagement (2009)

- Part of the War in Afghanistan
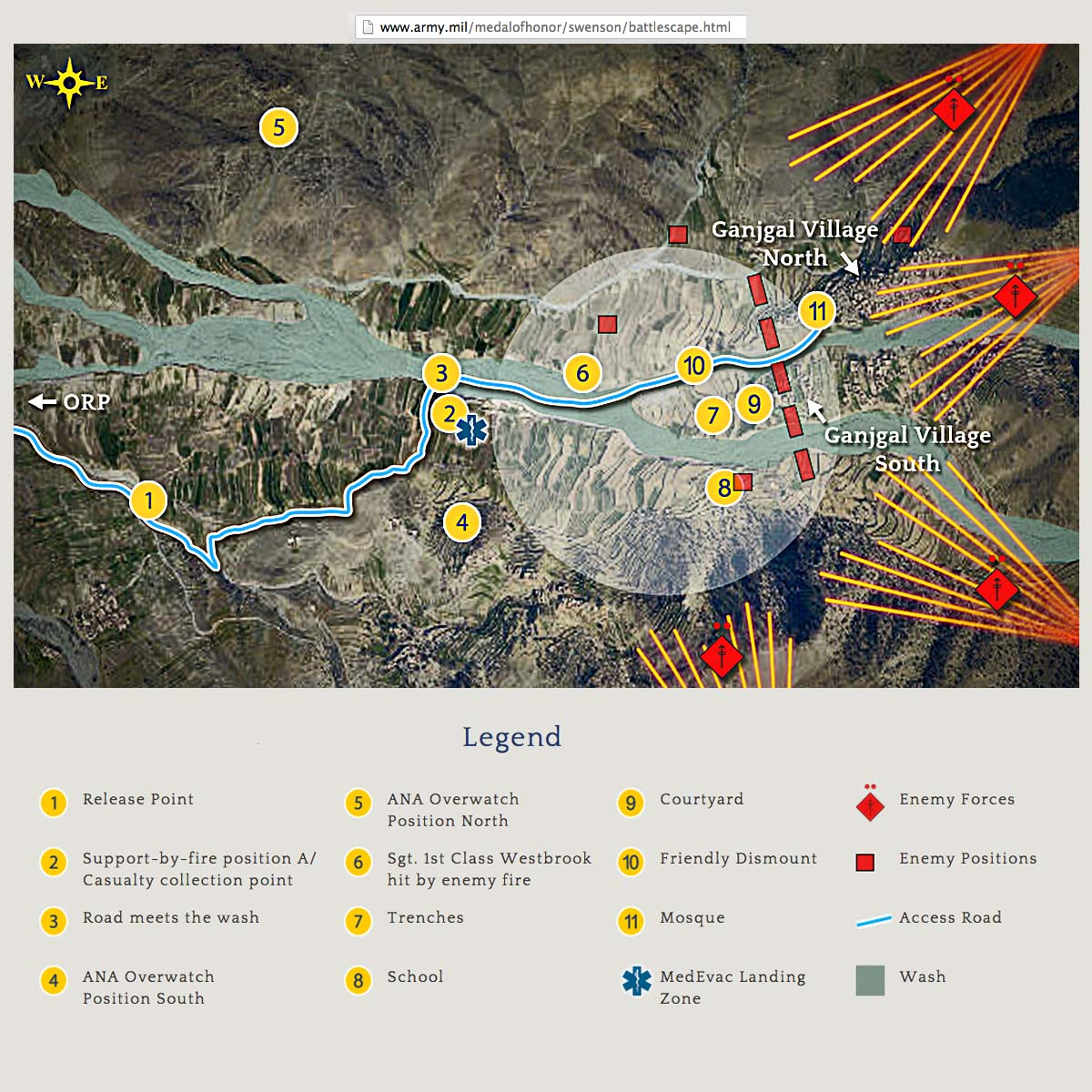
- U.S. Army's "Battlescape" diagram
Date	September 8, 2009
Location	Ganjgal village, Kunar Province, Afghanistan 34.79°N 71.158°E
Result	Taliban victory

Belligerents
United States; Islamic Republic of Afghanistan	(Afghanistan) Taliban

Commanders and leaders
(United States) Maj Kevin Williams; (United States) Cpt William D. Swenson; (United States) Capt Ademola D. Fabayo; (United States) 1st Sgt Christopher Garza	Unknown

Units involved
Joint (United States) / (Islamic Republic of Afghanistan): (United States) U.S. Marine Corps/U.S. Army Embedded Training Team 2-8; (Islamic Republic of Afghanistan) 1st Kandak, 2nd BDE, 201st Corps); (Islamic Republic of Afghanistan) Afghan Border Police	No specific units

Strength
(United States) 16 Embedded Forces (Islamic Republic of Afghanistan) 60 soldiers (Islamic Republic of Afghanistan) 30 border policemen	Approx. 150-200 insurgents

Casualties and losses
5 killed (Islamic Republic of Afghanistan) 8 killed	2 killed

The Battle of Ganjgal took place during the War in Afghanistan between American and Afghan forces and the Taliban in Kunar Province, Afghanistan on September 8, 2009. Complaints that the coalition casualties were avoidable and caused by a failure of the chain of command to provide fire support for the team triggered an official investigation and a series of reprimands to several US military officers. Army Captain William D. Swenson and Marine Corporal Dakota Meyer received the Medal of Honor for their actions during the battle. Meyer is the first living Marine to receive the Medal of Honor since the Vietnam War, and Swenson is the fifth living soldier and second officer to receive the Medal of Honor since the Vietnam War. Two other Marines at the battle, Staff Sgt. Juan Rodriguez-Chavez and Capt. Ademola Fabayo, received the Navy Cross.

== Background ==
On September 3 an Embedded Training Team (ETT) led a combined group of Afghan Army and National Police forces on a patrol operation around Dam Dara, a village about a mile from Ganjgal. The villagers reacted cordially but the ETT and its Afghan allies took small arms fire upon leaving Dam Dara from a small group of men on a ridge outside the village. After the brief attack the village elders of nearby Ganjgal renounced the attackers and requested that the coalition forces return to their village to conduct a census of military age males and assist in the rebuilding of the local mosque. The original date of September 7 was pushed back by the ETT at the last minute in order to ensure that their National Police forces were adequately prepared for the coming operation.

== Engagement ==
The following day, on September 8, an alternate Training Team, ETT 2-8, set out with their allied Afghan forces to Ganjgal. During their mission planning, it was made clear that no dedicated close air support would be available for the mission but commanders promised artillery support from nearby forward bases. In addition, ETT 2-8 was told that, in case of emergency, helicopter support could be redirected from an operation in a neighboring valley within five minutes. Initial intelligence available to the team indicated that Taliban forces were aware of the pending mission and were setting up ambush positions within the village with a forward force of at least 20 fighters. Concerned with both losing the initiative and the safety of the anti-Taliban village elders, ETT 2-8 decided to proceed with the mission and engage the Taliban forces.

Just after dawn, after inserting into the valley and approaching Ganjgal, the Task Force came under heavy machine gun, small arms and RPG fire from at least 200 entrenched Taliban fighters, far more than were indicated present by intelligence reports. The Task Force soon found itself pinned down in a three-sided ambush and taunted over open radio channels by Taliban fighters. Initial calls for artillery support were rejected by the command post due to new rules of engagement put in place by the commander of the International Security Assistance Force, General Stanley McChrystal, in an effort to reduce civilian casualties. Both an Army artillery NCO and an Air Force JTAC took immediate action to provide the ambushed US/Afghan unit with fire support, but they were overruled by the command post. ETT 2-8 informed their command post that they were not near the village but were again denied fire support. ETT 2-8 began calls for emergency helicopter support but the adjacent helicopter assets were tied up and taking fire in support of another operation.

The coalition forces were taking increasing fire and could observe women and children shuttling fresh ammunition to Taliban fighting positions. Within 30 minutes of making contact, the ETT ordered back to the command post to provide an artillery barrage of smoke canisters to cover their withdrawal. Told that no standard smoke was available, the team requested white phosphorus rounds be used instead to screen their retreat. Nearly an hour later, the white phosphorus rounds landed and the coalition forces retreated under heavy fire a short distance before being pinned once again. By this time, three U.S. Marines, their Navy corpsman, their Afghan interpreter and several Afghan soldiers had been killed, and an Army soldier in the ETT had sustained mortal wounds. Taliban snipers were moving into flanking positions when helicopter support arrived and began to attack Taliban positions. This arrival allowed the wounded to be pulled out and for three Marines to fight their way back up the hill to retrieve fallen comrades. By the time Task Force Chosin had totally disengaged, the firefight had lasted for nearly nine hours.

The position occupied by the three dead Marines and the Navy corpsman had been overrun by the enemy, who stripped the bodies of their gear and weapons. The bodies were recovered after their comrades (including Medal of Honor recipients Dakota Meyer and William D. Swenson) braved enemy fire to return to the location.

== Aftermath ==
After the battle, coalition forces speculated that elements within the Afghan National Police forces and local villagers had informed nearby Taliban forces of the mission's timing and location. In addition, an investigation was launched into the lack of requested fire and air support. While members of the task force publicly blamed McChrystal's new rules of engagement, which were also cited by personnel at the command post, the investigation placed most blame on the battalion leadership concluding it had been "negligent". The investigation found that three US Army officers at nearby Forward Operating Base Joyce, from Task Force Chosin, a unit comprising soldiers from 1st Battalion, 32nd Infantry Regiment, 3rd Brigade Combat Team, 10th Mountain Division, out of Fort Drum, New York, had exhibited "negligent leadership" which had directly contributed to the loss of life in the battle. Two of the three officers, Major Peter Granger and Captain Aaron Harting, were given formal reprimands.

In September 2012, a McClatchy journalist interviewed nine Afghan soldiers from the Afghan National Army's 1st Kandak, 2nd Infantry Brigade, 201st Corps who had been present at the battle. The Afghan soldiers disputed portions of the US Marine Corps's account of the battle, stating that the Taliban did not charge Meyer's vehicle and that only two dead Taliban were found after the battle. The Afghan soldiers stated that it was the belated arrival of attack helicopters which finally chased away the Taliban, not the actions of any of the U.S. soldiers or Marines on the ground. The Afghans added that the three Marines and naval corpsman, 1st Lt. Michael Johnson, Staff Sgt. Aaron Kenefick, Gunnery Sgt. Edwin W. Johnson, and Hospital Corpsman 3rd Class James Layton, were killed after remaining behind to cover the withdrawal of the Afghan soldiers from the ambush site. Marine First Sergeant Christopher Garza suffered a near-total loss of hearing and a serious concussion from a rocket-propelled grenade explosion.

Several members of ETT 2-8 were cited for valor with several Bronze Stars and a single Medal of Honor was awarded to Meyer. Two Marines, Captain Ademola D. Fabayo, 30, and Staff Sergeant Juan Rodriguez-Chavez, 34, were awarded the Navy Cross for their actions during the battle.

=== William D. Swenson ===
Due to his actions during the battle, former Army Captain William D. Swenson was recommended to receive the Medal of Honor by Marine General John R. Allen. Having been critical of the officers superior to him during the battle, he left the Army in February 2011. A 2012 investigation by McClatchy News Service, a news agency that has been criticized for leaking information that has aided the Taliban, concluded that the justification for Meyer's decoration may have been inflated and that the nomination for Swenson's Medal of Honor may have been intentionally lost as retaliation for his criticism. Meyer disputes McClatchy's allegations in his book, Into the Fire: A Firsthand Account of the Most Extraordinary Battle in the Afghan War. In August 2012, California Representative Duncan D. Hunter wrote to Secretary of Defense Leon Panetta regarding the Medal of Honor nomination of Swenson, comparing his case to that of Sgt. Rafael Peralta. In January 2013, Representative Hunter said Swenson's nomination had been awaiting President Barack Obama's approval at the White House since at least July 2012. Representative Hunter stated he was considering seeking an inspector general inquiry due to the delay. Swenson was awarded the Medal of Honor on October 15, 2013.
