= Eric Slover =

US Army Medal of Honor recipient

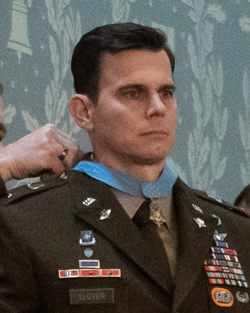
- CW5 Eric Slover receiving the Medal of Honor, 2026
- Born: Eric A. Slover
- Military career
- Allegiance: United States
- Branch: United States Army
- Service years: 2005–present
- Rank: Chief Warrant Officer 5
- Unit: 160th Special Operations Aviation Regiment (Airborne)
- Conflicts: War in Afghanistan; 2026 United States intervention in Venezuela
- Awards: Medal of Honor; Distinguished Service Cross; Distinguished Flying Cross (2) with valor device Bronze Star (3); Purple Heart; Meritorious Service Medal (4); Air Medal (4) with combat device Army Commendation Medal (3); Army Achievement Medal (4)

Eric A. Slover is a United States Army Chief Warrant Officer 5 (CW5) who received the Medal of Honor for his actions during Operation Absolute Resolve. During the operation, Slover was a MH-47 Chinook pilot in the 160th Special Operations Aviation Regiment (Airborne), colloquially known as the Night Stalkers. Slover is the first and only CW5 in history to receive the Medal of Honor.

== Military career ==
Slover enlisted in the Army in 2005. After completing basic training, he attended Warrant Officer Candidate School and flight school, becoming a Chinook helicopter pilot.

=== Afghanistan ===
While assisting in a medical evacuation in Badghis Province in November 2009 with the 82nd Airborne Division, a helicopter Slover was piloting was pierced by a rocket-propelled grenade. The munition failed to explode and remained in the helicopter for the duration of the flight. After landing, Slover was the first off the Chinook to get explosives experts and help for the wounded. This medical evacuation mission was described in 2009 as one of the "biggest of the Afghan War".

=== Operation Absolute Resolve ===
During the American raid that captured Venezuelan President Nicolás Maduro, Slover was the flight lead in the cockpit of the first helicopter, a MH-47 Chinook. The helicopter came under severe machine-gun fire and Slover was hit four times in his leg and hip. Maintaining control of the aircraft despite his wounds, Slover safely landed the helicopter, allowing the operation to continue. Slover was awarded the Medal of Honor by US President Donald Trump at the 2026 State of the Union Address. Slover was one of two men to receive the Medal of Honor during the address, alongside the 100-year-old US Navy Captain E. Royce Williams, a Korean War veteran. This was the first time the Medal of Honor was awarded at a State of the Union Address.

=== Medal of Honor citation ===
Chief Warrant Officer Five Eric A. Slover distinguished himself by conspicuous gallantry and intrepidity, above and beyond the call of duty, on January 3, 2026, during a mission in Venezuela, in support of Operation Absolute Resolve. Chief Warrant Officer Five Slover piloted his MH-47 as the lead aircraft of the operation, tasked with executing a highly complex infiltration through hostile Integrated Air Defense Systems to safely deliver military forces. During ingress, Chief Warrant Officer Five Slover skillfully led the helicopter force through a dense jungle valley in a mountainous region, navigating marginal weather conditions, numerous topographical hazards, and near insurmountable surface to air threats. Upon touching down at the designated landing zone, Chief Warrant Officer Five Slover’s aircraft was immediately engaged by multiple machine gun positions at close range. The hostile fire resulted in 15 armor-piercing rounds entering his cockpit, with four rounds striking his leg. Despite the intense and effective enemy fire, and at great personal risk, Chief Warrant Officer Five Slover maintained his situational awareness and aircraft’s position in the line of fire to ensure the safe infiltration of the military forces. After the force disembarked, and despite suffering significant life-threatening injuries, Chief Warrant Officer Five Slover identified hostile heavy machine gun positions that were engaging his aircraft and targeting the ground forces. He maneuvered his aircraft to enable his door gunner to deliver effective fire, successfully neutralizing the threats. Chief Warrant Officer Five Slover’s heroic actions undoubtedly saved countless American lives and ensured the complete and overwhelming success of the mission. His gallantry under fire and extraordinary valor are in keeping with the highest traditions of military service and reflect great credit upon himself and the United States Army.

== Personal life ==
Slover is a graduate of the College of Graduate and Continuing Studies at Norwich University located in Northfield, Vermont. His wife, Amy, blessed his dog tags with holy water before the mission.

== Awards ==
Personal decorations
	Medal of Honor
	Distinguished Service Cross
	Distinguished Flying Cross with "V" device and oak leaf cluster
Width-44 scarlet ribbon with width-4 ultramarine blue stripe at center, surrounded by width-1 white stripes. Width-1 white stripes are at the edges.	Bronze Star Medal with two oak leaf clusters
	Purple Heart
	Meritorious Service Medal with three oak leaf clusters
	Air Medal with "C" device and numeral 4
	Army Commendation Medal with two oak leaf clusters
	Army Achievement Medal with three oak leaf clusters
Unit awards
	Presidential Unit Citation
	Valorous Unit Award
	Army Meritorious Unit Commendation with oak leaf cluster
	Army Superior Unit Award with oak leaf cluster
Campaign and service medals
	National Defense Service Medal
	Afghanistan Campaign Medal with four service stars
	Inherent Resolve Campaign Medal
	Global War on Terrorism Expeditionary Medal
	Global War on Terrorism Service Medal
	Korea Defense Service Medal
Service, training, and marksmanship awards
	Army Service Ribbon
	Army Overseas Service Ribbon with unknown numeral device
Foreign awards
	NATO Medal with service star
	The Military Marching Badge (Norwegian Foot March)

Other accoutrements
Combat Action Badge
Army Master Aviator Badge
Parachutist Badge
Air Assault Badge
US Army Special Operations Command Combat Service Identification Badge
160th Special Operations Aviation Regiment (Airborne) Distinctive Unit Insignia
10 Overseas Service Bars
