= William D. Swenson =

United States Army Medal of Honor recipient

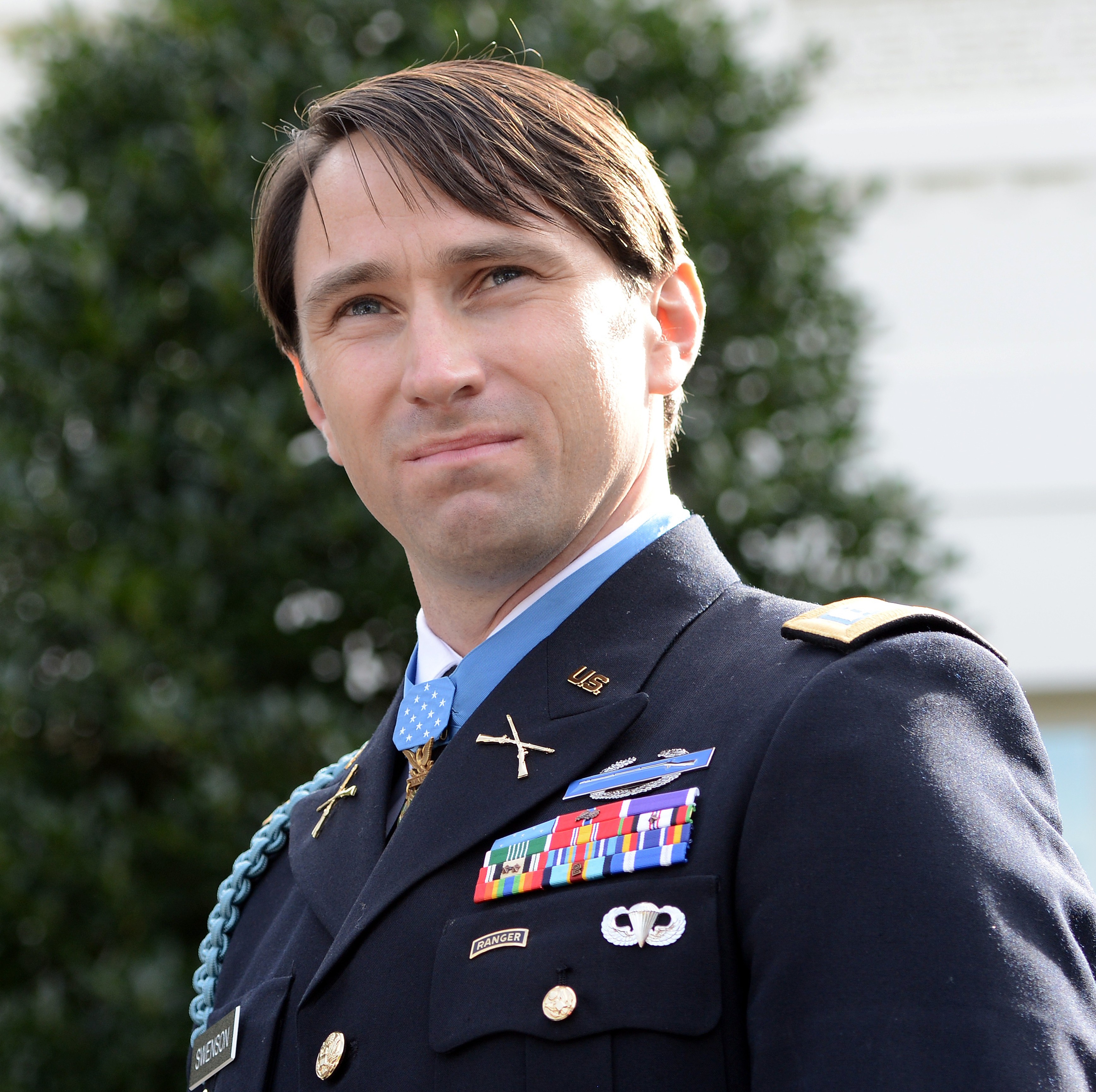
- Swenson speaking to reporters at the White House after receiving the Medal of Honor on October 15, 2013
- Born: November 2, 1978 (age 47); Seattle, Washington, U.S.
- Alma mater: Seattle University (BS); Naval Postgraduate School (MA)
- Military career
- Allegiance: United States
- Branch: United States Army
- Service years: 2002–2011 (9 years); 2014–2025 (11 years)
- Rank: Lieutenant Colonel
- Units: 1st Battalion, 32nd Infantry Regiment, 10th Mountain Division
- Conflicts: Iraq War; War in Afghanistan: Battle of Ganjgal
- Awards: Medal of Honor; Bronze Star Medal (3); Purple Heart

William D. Swenson (born November 2, 1978) is a lieutenant colonel in the United States Army who was awarded the Medal of Honor in a ceremony on October 15, 2013. He was the sixth living recipient in the war on terror.

== Early life and education ==
Swenson graduated from Seattle University, with a Bachelor of Science degree in political science, in 2001.

== Military career ==
Swenson was commissioned from Officer Candidate School as a United States Army infantry officer in September 2002. His military education, mostly at Fort Benning, includes Basic and Advanced Infantry Officer Courses, Ranger School, and Airborne School. He has deployed three times in the war on terror, once to Iraq and twice to Afghanistan. He has been awarded the Bronze Star Medal (with two oak leaf clusters), the Purple Heart (for having been wounded in action), and the Combat Infantryman Badge. At the time of the Battle of Ganjgal, Swenson was a captain in 3rd Brigade Combat Team, 10th Mountain Division, detailed as an Embedded Trainer for the Afghan Border Police.

Swenson left the U.S. Army in February 2011 and lived in Seattle, Washington. At the time, when Swenson received the Medal of Honor, he was unemployed, and had been since after he left the Army. In October 2013, Swenson requested to return to active duty. On March 14, 2014, he was accepted back onto active duty and served as a plans officer at the I Corps headquarters. Later in 2014, Swenson was named "Alumnus of the Year" by Seattle University. In 2015, along with Representative Duncan D. Hunter and others, Swenson advocated on behalf of Major Mathew Golsteyn, who had his Silver Star revoked following an investigation that initially led to no charges; however in December 2018, Golsteyn was charged with murder, being recalled to active duty to face the charge, but the charges were subsequently dropped and Golsteyn was administratively discharged instead. In March 2016, Swenson was assigned to United States Army South.

In December 2017, Swenson earned a Master of Arts in Security Studies Western Hemisphere from the Naval Postgraduate School in Monterey, California. In August 2018, Swenson took the place of Major General James E. Livingston on the board of the National Medal of Honor Museum Foundation. Swenson was promoted to lieutenant colonel on October 31, 2019.

=== Medal of Honor action ===
On September 8, 2009, Swenson was part of an operation to connect the Afghan government with native elders in the Ganjgal Valley in Eastern Kunar Province in Afghanistan, near the Pakistan border.

According to the United States Army's detailed Official Narrative, the coalition force's 106-man column entered the valley and was ambushed at about 6 a.m. by as many as 60 insurgent fighters who soon surrounded the column on three sides, situated on terraced high ground. Within an hour, communication to the front of the column, including four U.S. servicemen, was lost. Meanwhile, Captain Swenson, who initially was positioned toward the rear of the column, called for air support, and with two comrades crossed 50 meters of open space under direct enemy fire to administer life-extending first aid to his severely wounded sergeant. When the column was surrounded by enemy fighters that advanced within 50 meters, Swenson responded to Taliban demands for surrender by throwing a hand grenade, an act of defiance that rallied his comrades to repel the enemy advance.

Swenson and comrades moved his sergeant and other wounded to a helicopter for medical evacuation before returning to the enemy's "kill zone" for at least two more trips in an unarmored vehicle to evacuate additional wounded. Returning even more deeply through the kill zone toward the location of the head of column in search of the four U.S. servicemen, Swenson's party first rescued and recovered several Afghan National Security Force wounded and dead. Finally, Swenson and a small contingent recovered the four fallen U.S. servicemen who had been discovered by a search and rescue aircraft at noon. The 6-7 hour firefight caused 15 coalition deaths, including the four U.S. servicemen; also, Swenson's sergeant, Kenneth Westbrook, died of his wounds after returning from Afghanistan. Swenson's actions are believed to have directly contributed to saving more than a dozen Afghan lives.

Captain Swenson directs medical evacuation of a wounded comrade during a battle for which he received the Medal of Honor
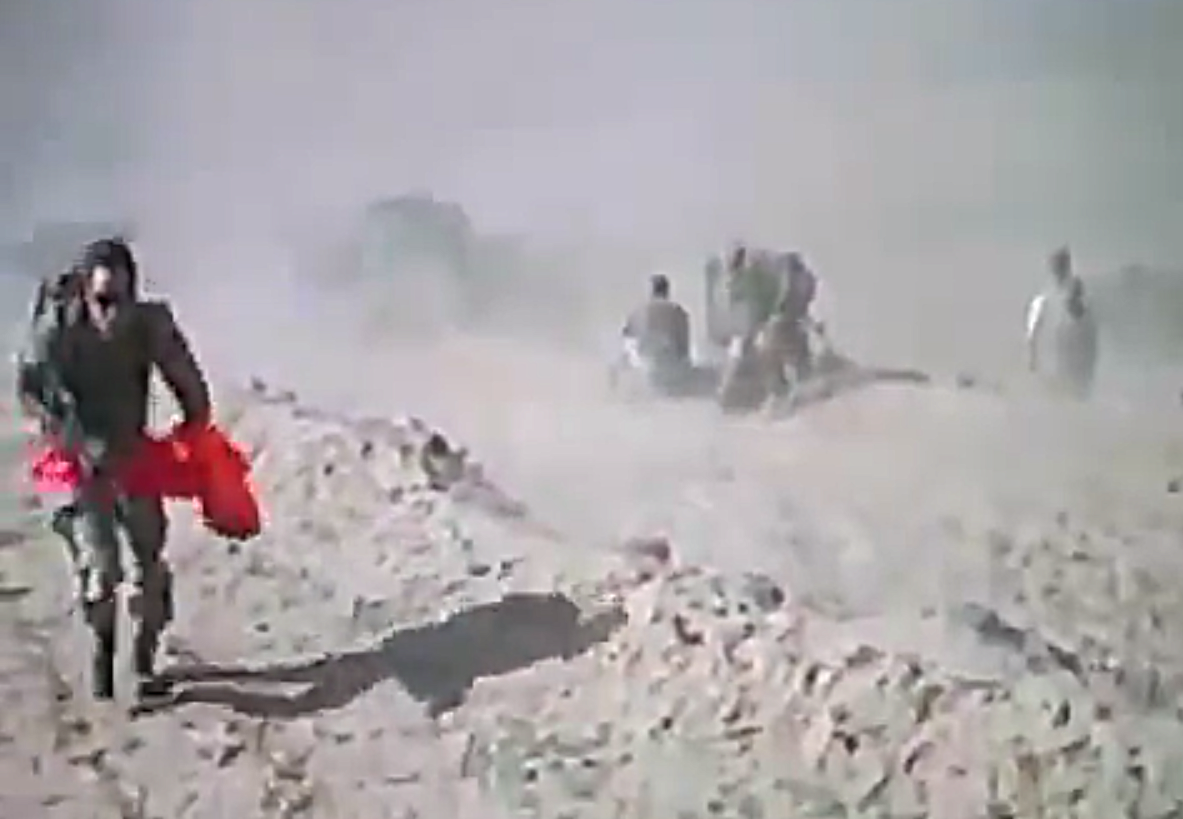
Swenson approaches a medical evacuation helicopter that he guided to land using a VS-17 signal panel that he still carries.

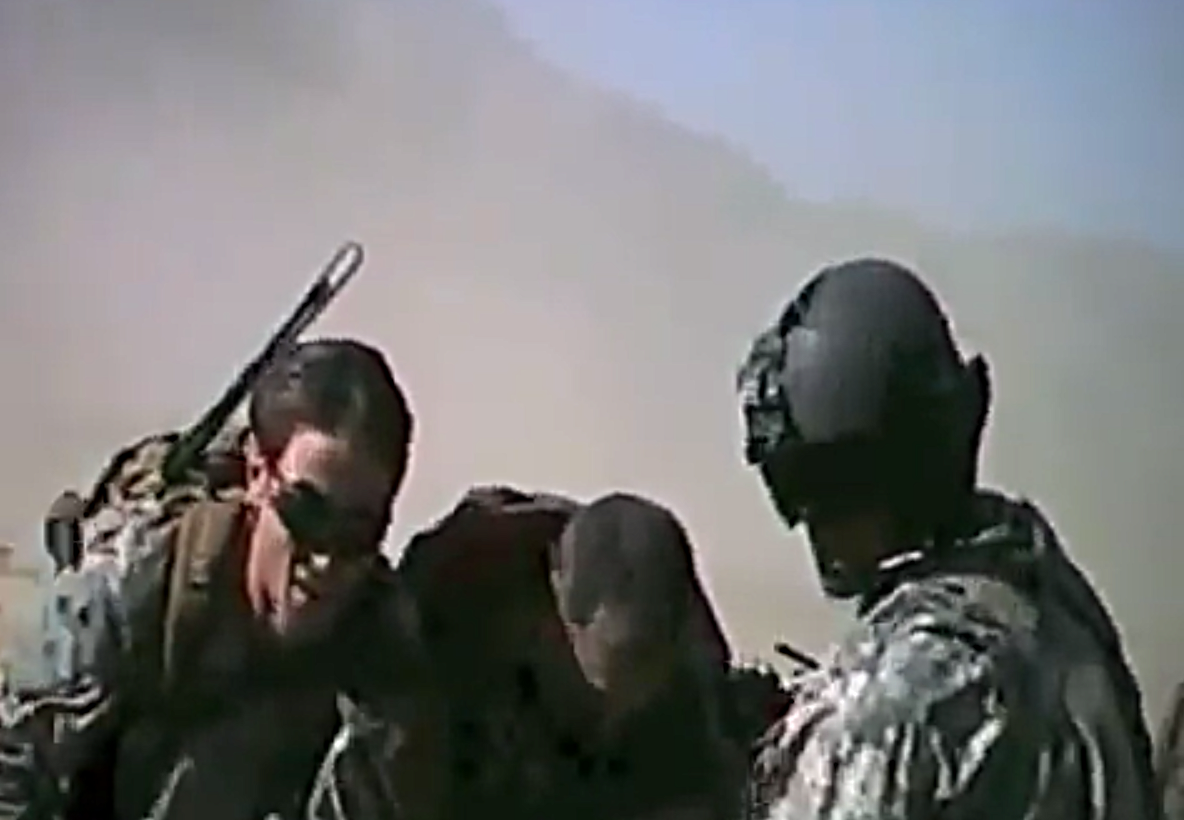
Swenson (left) helps carry a wounded comrade (center) to the helicopter for medical evacuation.

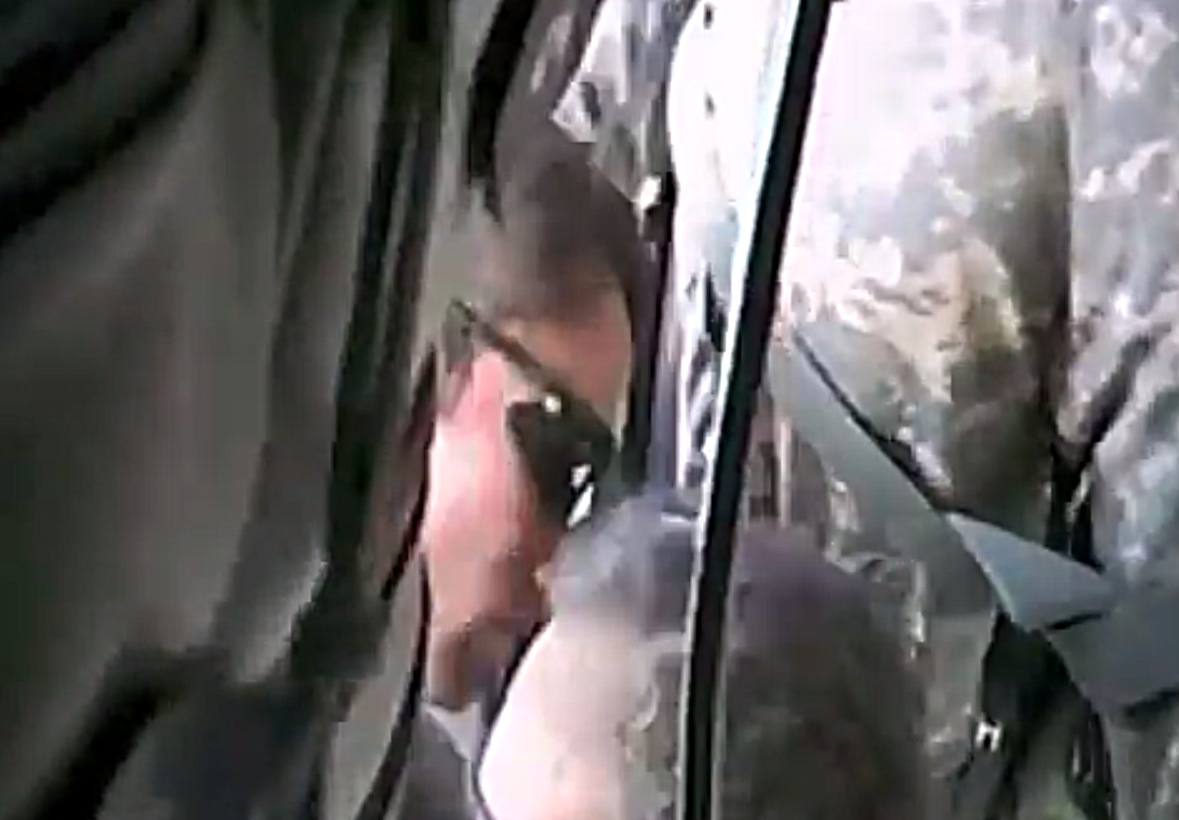
Before returning to battle, Captain Swenson kisses the forehead of his wounded sergeant, Kenneth Westbrook, who died of his wounds weeks later.

=== Medal of Honor award ===
Swenson received the Medal of Honor from President Barack Obama on October 15, 2013. Swenson was nominated for his actions as an Embedded Trainer in the Battle of Ganjgal near the Afghanistan-Pakistan border on September 8, 2009. He is reported to have repeatedly entered the "kill zone" in order to rescue wounded American and Afghan soldiers, much like his fellow serviceman Dakota Meyer who was awarded the Medal of Honor in 2011. Swenson became the first living officer to receive the Medal of Honor since the Vietnam War.

Footage of Swenson from a camera on a helicopter was the first time that part of an event which led to the awarding of the Medal of Honor was filmed. This makes Swenson the fourth Medal of Honor recipient whose actions were caught on film. Being recommended for the Medal of Honor in December 2009 by a battalion commander, the paperwork was lost, causing a significant delay in the nomination process. Prior to the paperwork being lost, General David Petraeus had recommended that the award be downgraded to a Distinguished Service Cross. There are accusations in both the military and the press that the lost paperwork was punishment for Swenson loudly criticizing his senior officers for not sending fire support in an after-action investigation into the battle. Swenson's case was reopened in 2011 at the urging of Marine Corps General John R. Allen. Dakota Meyer strongly advocated for Swenson's Medal of Honor in his book, Into the Fire: A Firsthand Account of the Most Extraordinary Battle in the Afghan War, writing that if it were not for Swenson, he (Meyer) would not be alive today. In May 2014, the Department of Defense reported that based on an investigation, Swenson's Medal of Honor recommendation was lost in the Army's email system. In February 2015, it was revealed that in the period prior to Swenson receiving the Medal of Honor in 2013, the Criminal Investigation Command began an investigation of Swenson due to negative comments about a book by a former Pentagon official made in an Amazon.com review by Major Mathew Golsteyn in 2011. In the review, Golsteyn, who was investigated over his killing of a Taliban bombmaker in 2010, referred to Swenson as a friend.

=== Hall of Heroes induction ceremony ===
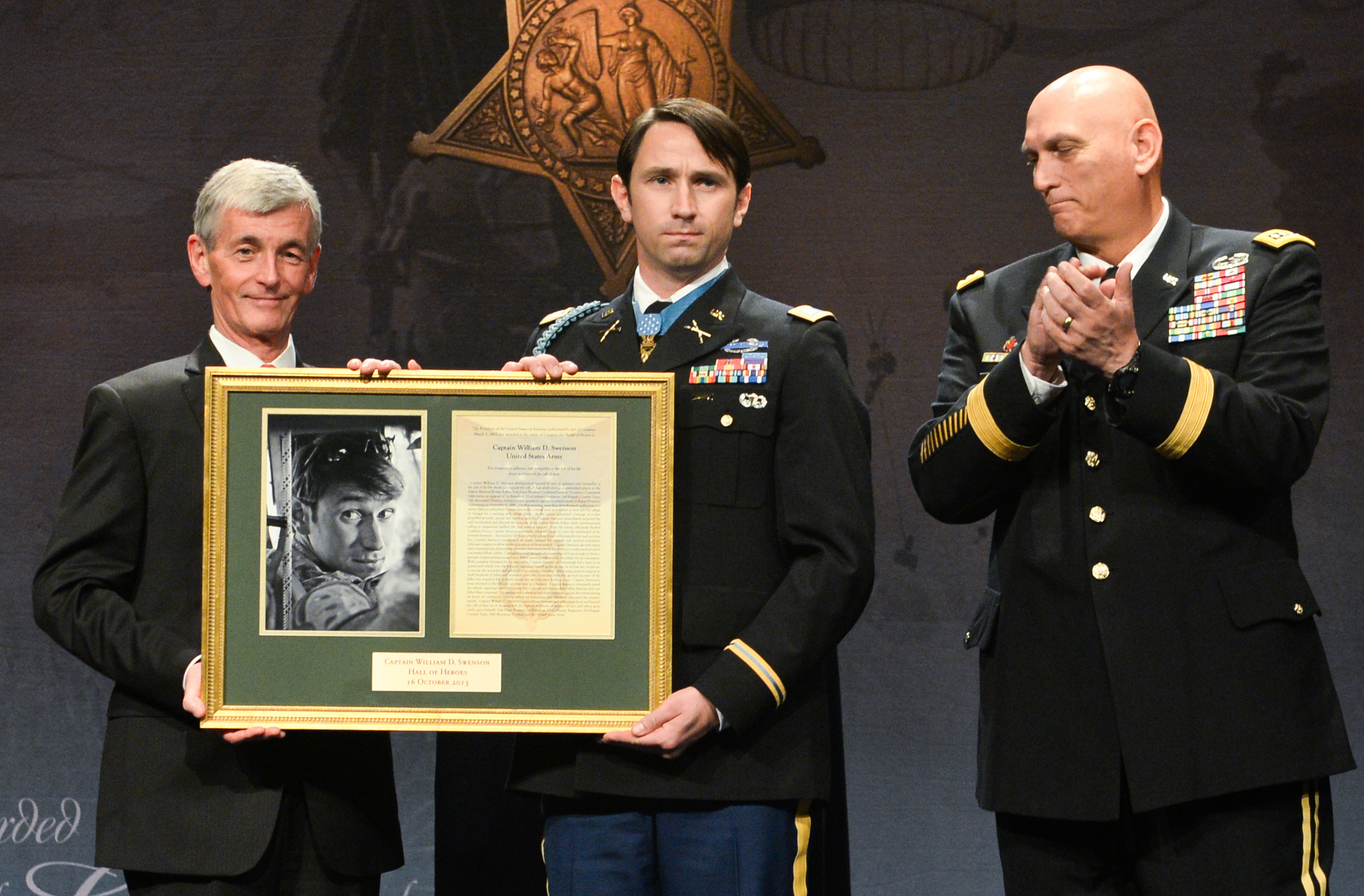
On October 16, 2013, Swenson was inducted into the Pentagon's Hall of Heroes. During the ceremony, the Secretary of the Army and the Army Chief of Staff presented Swenson with a framed copy of his Medal of Honor citation.

Following the Medal of Honor presentation at the White House, on October 16, 2013, Swenson was inducted into the Pentagon Hall of Heroes. The ceremony was officiated by Chuck Hagel, the Secretary of Defense. Hagel was assisted by the Secretary of the Army John M. McHugh, Army Chief of Staff General Ray Odierno and the Sergeant Major of the Army, Raymond F. Chandler. During the ceremony, Hagel apologized to Swenson for the mishandling of his award nomination, which had been delayed for 19 months because of what officials called a bureaucratic oversight. McHugh later told the standing room only audience that the army would implement a new process providing greater oversight to "ensure that no future award packet is lost along the way or paperwork misplaced or somehow forgotten in the fog of war." The new directive, McHugh stated, required Medal of Honor nominations be sent immediately to Army Human Resources Command. "As soon as an honors packet is created at battalion level, we will have immediate visibility at Army headquarters," he told the audience.

Referencing allegations that Swenson's award had been intentionally lost as a result of his criticizing leadership actions after the battle, Odierno said that "Swenson's strength of character was undeniable. Even after the battle, Will was not afraid to point out deficiencies in the operation that caused difficulties in obtaining the appropriate and timely support necessary. He recognized the importance of assessing performance, and had the character to stick to his convictions."

Following the presentation of his framed citation and the personal Medal of Honor flag, Swenson spoke briefly.

I look at this crowd and I see the strength of a nation and I see the strength of a fighting force, one that I fought proudly with. I look at my fellow Marines, Army, Navy and Air Force, a team that I fought side-by-side with as brothers. It's the proudest moment of my life and I'm honored and privileged to know these men.

=== Medal of Honor citation ===
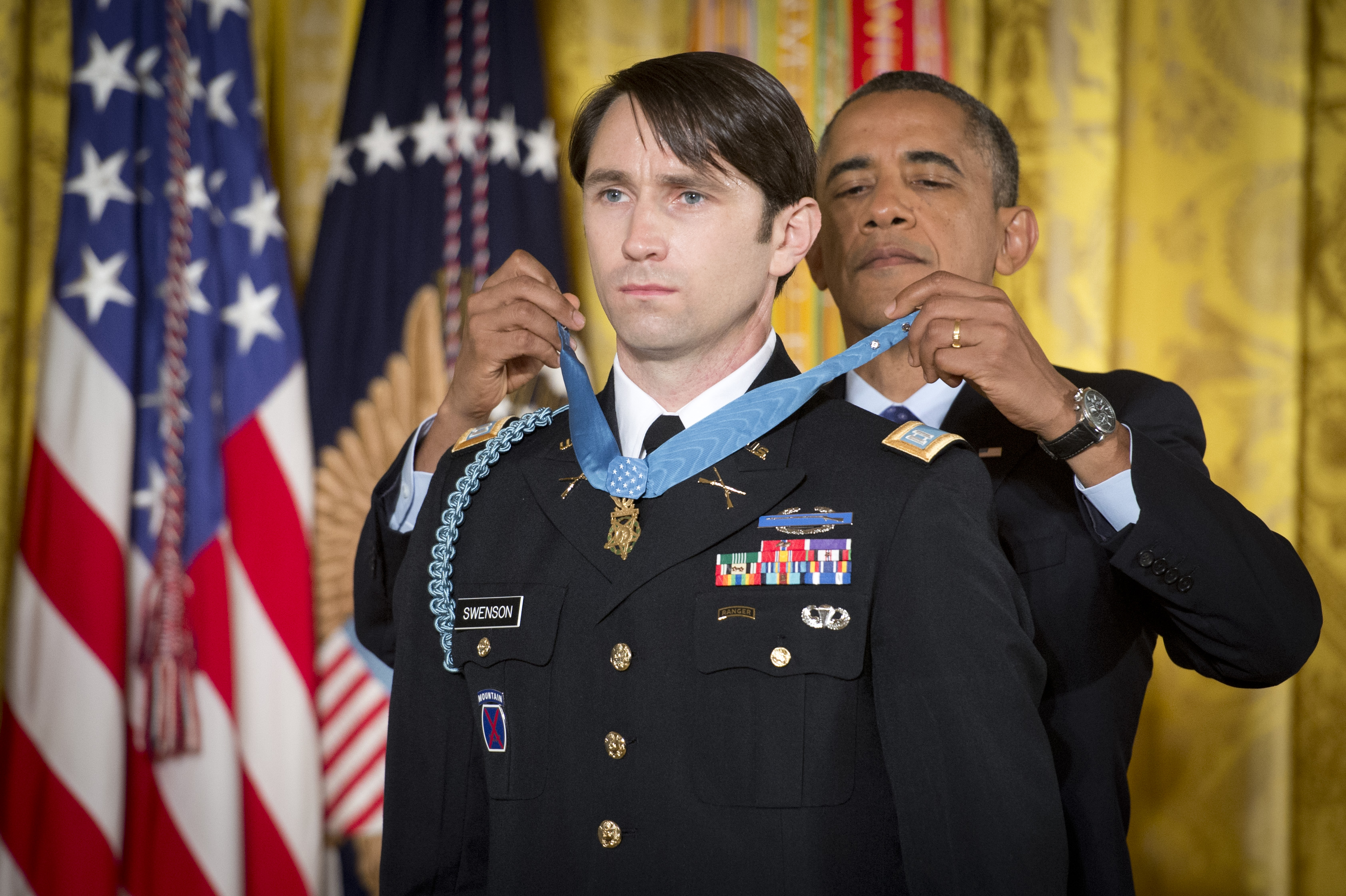
Swenson receives the Medal of Honor from President Barack Obama

Captain William D. Swenson distinguished himself by acts of gallantry and intrepidity at the risk of his life above and beyond the call of duty while serving as embedded advisor to the Afghan National Border Police, Task Force Phoenix, Combined Security Transition Command-Afghanistan in support of 1st Battalion, 32nd Infantry Regiment, 3rd Brigade Combat Team, 10th Mountain Division, during combat operations against an armed enemy in Kunar Province, Afghanistan on September 8, 2009. On that morning, more than 60 well-armed, well-positioned enemy fighters ambushed Captain Swenson's combat team as it moved on foot into the village of Ganjgal for a meeting with village elders. As the enemy unleashed a barrage of rocket-propelled grenade, mortar and machine gun fire, Captain Swenson immediately returned fire and coordinated and directed the response of his Afghan Border Police, while simultaneously calling in suppressive artillery fire and aviation support. After the enemy effectively flanked Coalition Forces, Captain Swenson repeatedly called for smoke to cover the withdrawal of the forward elements. Surrounded on three sides by enemy forces inflicting effective and accurate fire, Captain Swenson coordinated air assets, indirect fire support and medical evacuation helicopter support to allow for the evacuation of the wounded. Captain Swenson ignored enemy radio transmissions demanding surrender and maneuvered uncovered to render medical aid to a wounded fellow soldier. Captain Swenson stopped administering aid long enough to throw a grenade at approaching enemy forces, before assisting with moving the soldier for air evacuation. With complete disregard for his own safety, Captain Swenson unhesitatingly led a team in an unarmored vehicle into the kill zone, exposing himself to enemy fire on at least two occasions, to recover the wounded and search for four missing comrades. After using aviation support to mark locations of fallen and wounded comrades, it became clear that ground recovery of the fallen was required due to heavy enemy fire on helicopter landing zones. Captain Swenson's team returned to the kill zone another time in a Humvee. Captain Swenson voluntarily exited the vehicle, exposing himself to enemy fire, to locate and recover three fallen Marines and one fallen Navy corpsman. His exceptional leadership and stout resistance against the enemy during six hours of continuous fighting rallied his teammates and effectively disrupted the enemy's assault. Captain William D. Swenson's extraordinary heroism and selflessness above and beyond the call of duty are in keeping with the highest traditions of military service and reflect great credit upon himself, Task Force Phoenix, 1st Battalion, 32nd Infantry Regiment, 3rd Brigade Combat Team, 10th Mountain Division and the United States Army.

== Awards and decorations ==
The United States Army lists Swenson's awards and decorations as including:

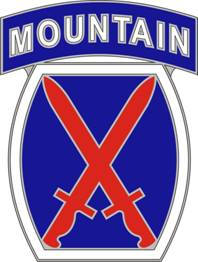

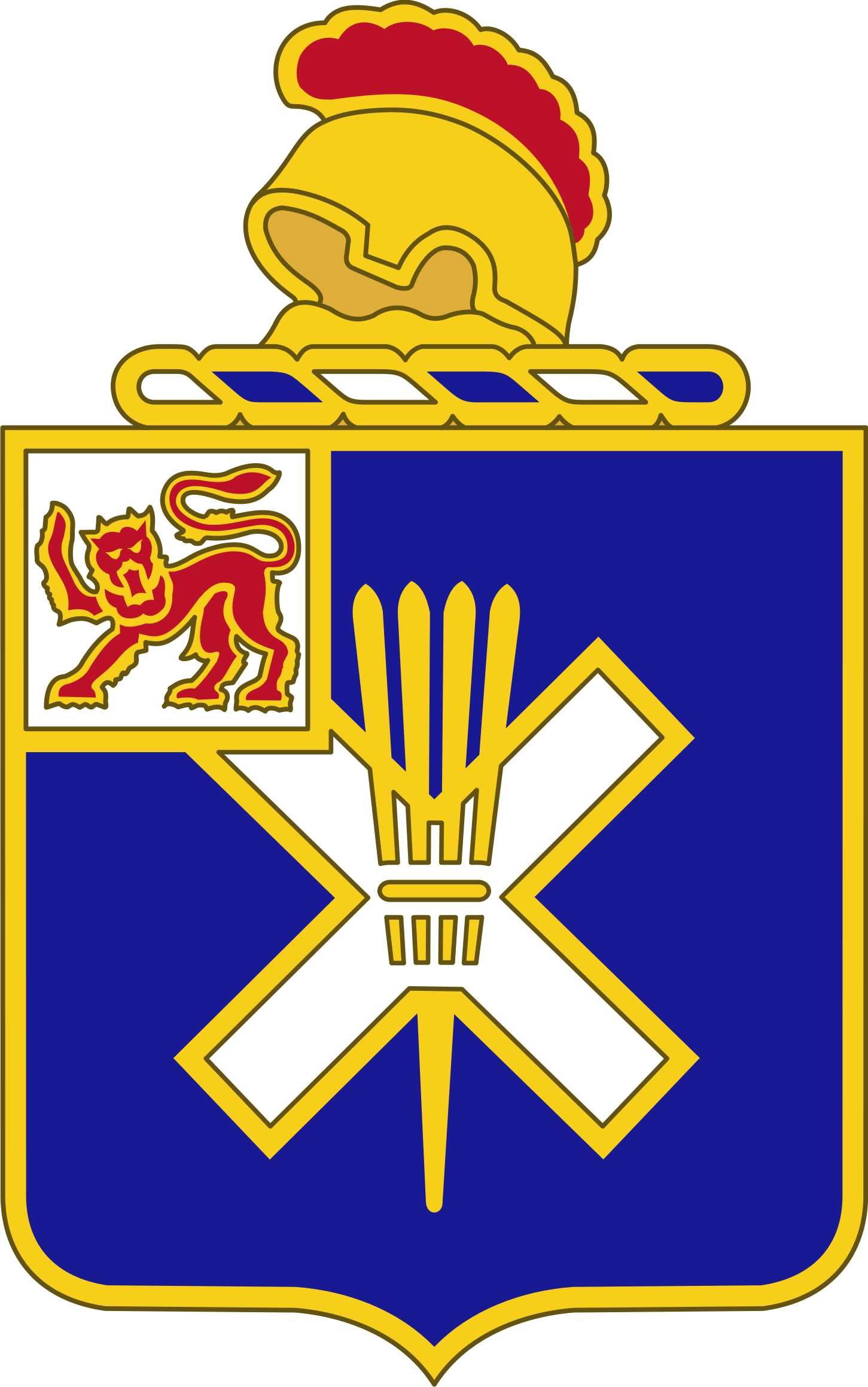

1st Row	Combat Infantryman Badge		
2nd Row	Medal of Honor	Bronze Star Medal with two bronze oak leaf clusters	Purple Heart Medal
3rd Row	Army Commendation Medal	National Defense Service Medal	Afghanistan Campaign Medal with one bronze service star
4th Row	Iraq Campaign Medal with two service stars	Global War on Terrorism Expeditionary Medal	Global War on Terrorism Service Medal
5th Row	Army Service Ribbon	Army Overseas Service Ribbon with bronze award numeral 2	NATO Medal for service with ISAF
6th Row	Ranger Tab		Parachutist Badge
7th Row	10th Mountain Division CSIB		
8th Row	32nd Infantry Regiment Distinctive Unit Insignia		

Swenson also has five Overseas Service Bars.

== See also ==
- List of post-Vietnam Medal of Honor recipients
