= 4th Brigade Combat Team, 4th Infantry Division =

- Active: 1975-1984; 1996; 2004–2015
- Country: USA
- Branch: Regular Army
- Type: Brigade combat team
- Garrison/HQ: Fort Hood, TX; Fort Carson, CO
- Engagements: Operation Enduring Freedom Afghanistan; Operation Iraqi Freedom

The 4th Brigade Combat Team, 4th Infantry Division is an inactive brigade of the United States Army. Between 1975 and 1984, the brigade served at Fort Carson, CO, and in Germany. The brigade was reactivated in 2004, and deployed four times in support of the War on Terror, once to Iraq and three times to Afghanistan, before being inactivated in 2015.

== History ==
=== Cold War ===
The Brigade was first activated in December 1975 as "Brigade 76", a mechanized infantry brigade to reinforce Army forces in Europe under the 1974 Nunn Amendment. The Brigade deployed to Wiesbaden, West Germany between March and June 1976. Originally designed as rotational forces, the Brigade was reassigned to Europe permanently in late 1976, when expected cost savings from the use of rotational forces failed to materialize. The Brigade was subsequently inactivated in 1984.

=== Afghanistan and Iraq ===
As part of the US Army's reorganization in 2004, the 4th Infantry Division reactivated its 4th BCT as a modular BCT. Initially organized as a Heavy Brigade Combat Team (HBCT), the brigade included:

- Headquarters and Headquarters Company, 4th BCT
- 8th Squadron, 10th Cavalry Regiment
- 3rd Battalion, 67th Armored Regiment
- 1st Battalion, 12th Infantry Regiment
- 2nd Battalion, 77th Field Artillery Regiment
- Special Troops Battalion, 4th BCT
- 704th Brigade Support Battalion

The brigade deployed to Baghdad from 2006–2007. After returning to Fort Hood, the brigade was reflagged as 4th BCT, 1st Cavalry Division. Simultaneously, the 2nd BCT, 2nd Infantry Division at Fort Carson, CO, was reflagged as the 4th BCT, 4th Infantry Division. With the reflagging, the brigade was reorganized as an Infantry Brigade Combat Team (IBCT), consisting of:

- Headquarters and Headquarters Company, 4th BCT
- 3rd Squadron, 61st Cavalry Regiment
- 1st Battalion, 12th Infantry Regiment
- 2nd Battalion, 12th Infantry Regiment
- 2nd Battalion, 77th Field Artillery Regiment
- Special Troops Battalion, 4th BCT
- 704th Brigade Support Battalion

As an IBCT, the brigade deployed to Afghanistan three times, twice to Regional Command East and once to Regional Command South.

The brigade deployed to RC East from May 2009 to May 2010. On 3 October 2009, 54 Soldiers from the brigade's Troop B, 3-61 CAV were attacked by 300 or more insurgents at Combat Outpost Keating during the Battle of Kamdesh. Two Soldiers from the brigade, Staff Sergeant Clinton Romesha and then-Specialist Ty Carter were awarded the Medal of Honor for their actions during the battle. Eight American Soldiers from the brigade were killed, and 27 others were wounded during the battle.

=== Inactivation ===
On 16 April 2015, the 4th BCT inactivated, and reflagged as the 2nd BCT, as part of the Army's reduction to 32 BCTs.

== Lineage and honors ==
=== Lineage ===
- Constituted 1 December 1975 in the Regular Army as Headquarters and Headquarters Company, 4th Brigade, 4th Infantry Division, and activated at Fort Carson, Colorado
- Inactivated 15 December 1984 in Germany
- Activated 16 January 1996 at Fort Carson, Colorado
- Inactivated 15 March 1996 at Fort Carson, Colorado
- Headquarters, 4th Brigade, 4th Infantry Division redesignated 16 December 2004 as Headquarters 4th Brigade Combat Team, 4th Infantry Division, and concurrently activated at Fort Hood, Texas (Headquarters Company, 4th Brigade, 4th Infantry Division - hereafter separate lineage)

=== Campaign participation credit ===
- War on Terrorism: Campaigns to be determined

=== Decorations ===
- Meritorious Unit Commendation (Army), Streamer embroidered IRAQ 2005-2006
- Meritorious Unit Commendation (Army), Stream embroidered AFGHANISTAN 2009-2010

== See also ==
4th Infantry Division (United States)
