= Battle of Kamdesh =

2009 battle of the War in Afghanistan

- Part of the Taliban insurgency within the War in Afghanistan (2001–2021)
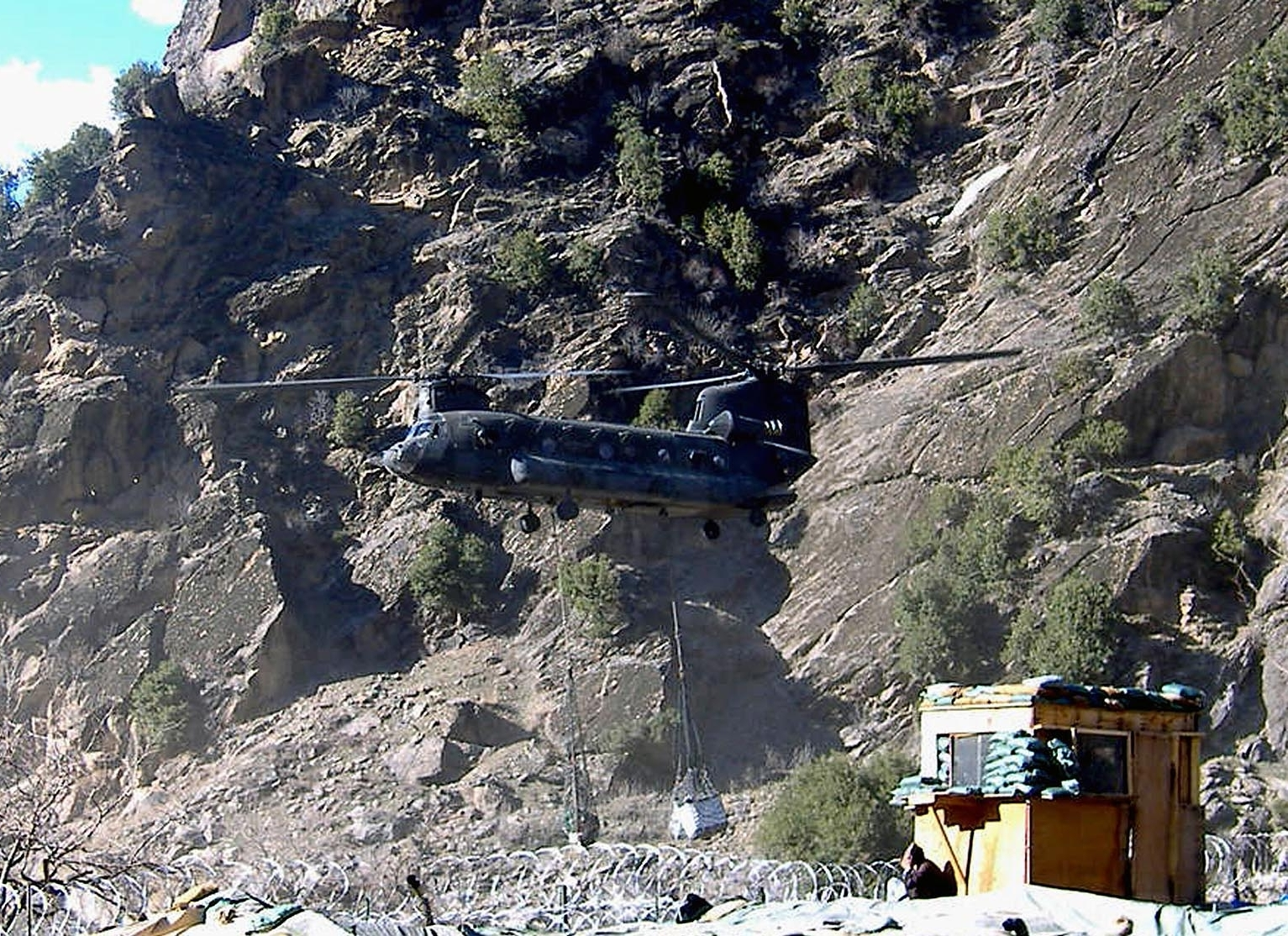
- Boeing CH-47 Chinook landing at Combat Outpost Keating in Afghanistan's Nuristan Province, March 2007
Date	October 3, 2009
Location	Kamdesh, Afghanistan 35.4231°N 71.3289°E
Result	See aftermath

Belligerents
United States; Afghanistan; Latvia	Taliban

Commanders and leaders
Gen. Curtis Scaparrotti; Col. Randy George (4-4ID TF Mountain Warrior); Lt. Col. Robert Brown (3-61 CAV TF Destroyer); Cpt. Stoney Portis (B Trp, 3-61 CAV); 1st Lt. Andrew Bundermann (B Trp, 3-61 CAV); Cpt. Agris Liepiņš	Dost Muhammad; Sirajuddin Haqqani; Ghulan Faroq; Abdul-Rahman Mustaghni

Strength
53; 42; 2	300

Casualties and losses
8 killed and 27 wounded 10 wounded and 20 captured	150 wounded or killed
- Location of Kamdesh within Afghanistan

The Battle of Kamdesh took place during the War in Afghanistan. It occurred on October 3, 2009, when a force of 300 Taliban assaulted the American Combat Outpost ("COP") Keating near the town of Kamdesh in Nuristan Province in eastern Afghanistan. The attack was the bloodiest battle for US forces since the Battle of Wanat in July 2008, which occurred 20 miles (32 km) away from Kamdesh. The attack on COP Keating resulted in 8 Americans killed and 27 wounded while the Taliban suffered 150–200 wounded or killed.

As a result of the battle, COP Keating was partially overrun and nearly destroyed. Observation Post ("OP") Fritsche was attacked simultaneously, limiting available support from that position. The Coalition forces withdrew from the base shortly after the battle. A deliberate withdrawal had been planned some time before the battle began, and the closing was part of a wider effort by the top commander in Afghanistan, General Stanley McChrystal, to cede remote outposts and consolidate troops in more populated areas to better protect Afghan civilians. The Americans "declared the outpost closed and departed—so quickly that they did not carry out all of their stored ammunition. The outpost's depot was promptly looted by the insurgents and bombed by American planes in an effort to destroy the lethal munitions left behind."

After an investigation, four officers in the chain of command were disciplined for their failure to adequately support the base. Eight aviators were awarded the Distinguished Flying Cross for helping defend the base. Staff Sergeant Clinton Romesha and Staff Sergeant Ty Carter were each awarded the Medal of Honor for their actions during the battle.

== Background ==
=== Kamdesh base origins ===
In 2006, Allied commanders identified the Kamdesh area to be key to denying anti-coalition militia the required access to supply lines crossing into and out of nearby Pakistan. This strategy depended upon extending government control by building and maintaining Provincial Reconstruction Team (PRT) bases. The Allies hoped that extending these bases into Nuristan, one of the most remote and isolated eastern provinces in Afghanistan, they could demonstrate to the entire Afghan population the government's credibility and power. These bases were a key element of the American counterinsurgency strategy.

Colonel John W. Nicholson Jr., Commander of the 3rd Infantry Brigade Combat Team of the 10th Mountain Division, had observed that Kamdesh was located at a point where three of the valley systems from the Pakistan border in the north converged. Nicholson and officers of his command believed that much of the flow of weapons and troops from Pakistan could be stopped at Kamdesh. Gul Mohammed Khan, the government administrator for Kamdesh District, lived at the intersection of the Landay-Sin and Darreh Ye Kushtoz rivers. These valley and road intersections combined with the political leadership in the area inspired the positioning of the Nuristan PRT.

The Nuristan Provincial Reconstruction Team base was strongly recommended by Nuristani Province Governor Tamim Nuristani. On July 20, 2006, 2:00 am all of Cherokee Company and one platoon from Able Troop, 3-71 Cavalry Squadron entered the area in two CH-47 Chinook helicopters on Landing Zone Warheit, a cornfield on a ridge near Kamdesh, under command of Lieutenant Colonel Howard to garrison the area. The camp was constructed by 3-71 Cavalry, 10th Mountain Division, (Reconnaissance, Surveillance, and Target Acquisition) in the summer of 2006 and was manned by their ABLE Troop element until June 2007.

The area had not been invaded by any conventional US forces prior to 3-71 Cavalry's takeover, although Special Operations forces operated in the area on a very limited basis. The camp was originally constructed to be a Provincial Reconstruction Team outpost, called PRT Kamdesh, but due to extremely high levels of fighting in the area it remained a fire base instead of a PRT. In December 2006, it was renamed Camp Keating after the death of ABLE Troop 3-71 Cavalry 10th Mountain Division's Executive Officer Benjamin Keating, who died November 26, 2006, in a vehicle accident while conducting combat operations south of the camp. 3-71 Cavalry conducted many successful combat missions in the area surrounding the camp and repelled various attacks on the base.

=== Terrain ===
The Kamdesh village and most of Nuristan is located in the Hindu Kush. This is a lofty mountain range characterized by steep slopes of enormous granite boulders separated by fast moving rivers in deep narrow valleys. The climate of the area has hot summers, including a monsoon season, and cold winters of ice and snow extending down into the valleys. The combination of volatile weather and rugged mountains make any kind of travel and life in general difficult and challenging. American military operations in Kamdesh were affected as soon as units began gathering for deployment in the area.

Operation Deep Strike began on May 5, 2006. This was a re-deployment from the Cowkay and Korangal Valleys to Kamdesh. The pick up zone for Able Troop 2nd Platoon was called PZ Reds, located on the side of an 8,000-foot mountain. It was nicknamed "Heart Attack Ridge" due to its steep slope and obstacles hazardous to low-flying aircraft. While attempting the pickup, a Chinook transport helicopter crashed in the darkness at 10:09 pm when the rear rotor hit a tree, and the helicopter slid down the slope and over a cliff, exploding in flames and killing all the crew and passengers. There was an element of ABLE Troop 3-71 CAV 2nd Platoon still left on the PZ after the crash that worked relentlessly to recover the bodies of their 10 comrades and destroy sensitive equipment in the wreckage.

After marching into the proposed site for the Kamdesh provincial outpost, Captain Michael and Cherokee Company's second platoon were confronted by a large boulder in the middle of the site that made landing a helicopter in the PRT site impossible. The rock could not be demolished without raining fragments into the town of Urmul across the Landay-Sin river. The landing zone was placed on the other side of the river on a rocky peninsula jutting into the river near Urmul. This separation of the landing zone, and the fact that the site was surrounded by mountains on three sides made the site unappealing because of the difficulty of mounting an effective defense.

On August 8, 2006, 19 days after the first American landing, the PRT was attacked for the first time. Captain Frank Brooks, commanding at LZ Warheit, was dismayed to discover the PRT could not be quickly reached by LZ Warheit. The PRT site resembled the bottom of a funnel. It could not be seen or supported with indirect fire due to the multi-level and complicated terrain. The steep mountains rendered two dimensional maps and landmarks useless. Eventually, supporting aircraft scattered the attackers.

From August 8 to November 25 of 2006, strenuous efforts were made to supply and expand the PRT by supply convoys using the Landay-Sin valley road from Naray FOB. Afghan contractors were unable to keep the narrow mountain road in safe condition, and convoys were subject to constant ambushes from the surrounding mountains that lined the route.

Despite recommendations not to drive the large supply vehicle, First Lieutenant Ben Keating took the wheel while returning an armored supply truck to the Naray FOB. He wanted to avoid risking the lives of his men while traveling on an unstable road subject to ambush with an overweight vehicle. During the highly risky convoy, the road collapsed under the weight of Keating's vehicle. He was thrown from the truck, which rolled over him and sank into the river. His death had a traumatic effect on the morale of 3-71 Cav. The Allies stopped using the Kamdesh-Naray road.

Combined with difficult conditions for air supply, and little support from the local population, supply to what was renamed Camp Keating on November 26, 2006, was wholly inadequate. As it became obvious that COP Keating was too isolated, indefensible, and impossible to supply, plans were made to close it beginning in December 2008.

=== Insurgency ===
The population of Nuristan is ethnically distinct from the rest of Afghanistan, and divided into four major groups: the Kom, Kata, Kushtoz, and Kalasha. These subgroups were in turn divided into clans and sects, depending on lineages and the interpretations of individual religious leaders. Five languages and various dialects are spoken by these groups, rendering translators from other areas of Afghanistan useless. The Soviets had to contend with a rebel group known as the Dawlet of eastern Nuristan. They professed a Salafi version of Islam, and were hostile to any political rivals. The Nuristanis had resisted Islam as late as the year 1895 and before that had been considered a Hindu nation (Islamic invaders called them "Kaffir", or heathens) with a long tradition of violently resisting outsiders and defending their beliefs.

Resistance in Nuristan revolved around a specific group of Islamic fighters known as Hezb-e-Islami Gulbuddin or HIG. During the Soviet occupation, HIG received more support from the CIA than any other Mujahideen resistance group. When it came to infiltrating from Pakistan, and setting ambushes, HIG was regarded as the most skillful. In 2006, HIG was actively resisting the Afghan government. When Captain Aaron Swain of Cherokee Co. had sounded out Afghan Border Police Commander Ahmed Shah about setting up near Kamdesh, he was told that HIG insurgents tried to blow up Shah's jeep on his last trip there and it was a bad place.

=== Tactics ===
American troops in Nuristan found themselves directly in opposition to the HIG forces. Colonel Pat Donahue, the former commander of the 3rd BCT, believed that the Nuristani population was essentially neutral, hostile to any outside groups, and so isolated that resources allocated to the region would be wasted. These resources were limited by the fact that only 5,000 American troops were available to occupy a rugged area the size of Virginia that had little infrastructure.

A new counter-insurgency strategy seemed to offer a way around these problems. Known as COIN and refined by General David Petraeus, Commander of US forces in Afghanistan, the Army and Marine Counter-insurgency Field Manual FM 3-24 was to convert the population of Nuristan to American goals. Unlike Donahue, Nicholson was a supporter of COIN in addition to seeing Kamdesh as a decisive control point.

The basic approach to victory by the PRT involved three steps:

- Make no distinctions between the enemy and the people.
- Link the people to their government.
- Transform Afghanistan by economic development and the creation of a national infrastructure.

Nicholson hoped the PRT would seed a process to be developed by the Nuristanis rather than imposed from the outside. Lieutenant Keating, first commander of the Kamdesh PRT, was determined to make COIN a success in the region.

Lieutenant Colonel Mike Howard, Squadron Commander, saw COIN as a process of providing three services:

- Provide clean water by installing gravity fed pipelines
- Repair the hydroelectric plants in Urmul and Kamdesh
- Set up new plants in Mirdesh and Gawardesh.
- New roads would be the final stage, built and maintained by local contractors.

This would, tentatively, improve the local economy while providing improved communications with the central government and the rest of the nation. 1.33 million dollars was budgeted for these projects. This had the potential to boost the local economy, which had seen few civic improvements. Keating saw these programs as producing terrible results. Villagers and clans who were left out of these projects were resentful, and quick to turn against the Americans. Haji Yunus, a village elder of Gawardesh and contractor for an electric plant, was kidnapped and murdered. A note was attached to his body which said: "Don't work with coalition forces. This will happen to you." The note was signed "Mullah Omar". Omar was the top Taliban leader, but U.S. Intelligence stated that HIG had done the killing, crediting Omar to instil more fear due to Omar's greater reputation. Constant ambushes and firefights along the road to Naray did little to relieve Keating's doubts. "The little bastards keep shooting at us every day.", was Keating's assessment.

After Keating's death, a "Night Letter" appeared on the door of the Upper Kamdesh mosque on April 29, 2007. The letter stated: "At the present time for those who work and obey the American scum by taking contracts for building schools, road, and power plants: also those who work as police, district administrators, and commanders as well as sold-out mullahs who deny Allah's orders and holy war and deny the holy Quran: We are telling you that we are continuing our holy war in Allah's will… Soon we will start our operations." This letter was written in Pashto and signed "Mujahideen".

The following day, insurgents allegedly kidnapped and murdered Fazal Ahad, an elder from Badmuk who was attempting to end the Kom/Kata tribal disagreements by arranging a meeting in Kamdesh. In response to this, the local Afghan officials sent more government troops into the area. These troops were ambushed on the Naray-Kamdesh road and shot up badly enough to prevent their arrival in Kamdesh.

The closeness of the action, and coordinated fire from both sides of the valley indicated that the attackers in this ambush were different from the groups that had been using sporadic, long range, harassing fire. The latest acronym for attackers used by the Americans was AAF, for anti-Afghan fighters. These AAF were more professional and probably represented groups from areas outside of Nuristan. AAF would disguise themselves in ANA uniforms and set up fake checkpoints to extract taxes and tolls from local contractors, and allied themselves with smugglers transporting illegal timber and gems into Pakistan. Urdu and Pashtun HIG warriors brought arms and ammunition from Pakistan. Their checkpoints and "taxes" was used to finance AAF operations. On the whole the AAF was a broader based and more formidable force in 2007 than before the American invasion, and represented a significant escalation.

At the end of May 2007, Bulldog Troop, 1-91 Cavalry Squadron, 173rd Airborne Brigade Combat Team, arrived at COP Keating commanded by Captain Tom Bostick. The first of these would be Operation Mountain II, an effort to extend a series of observation posts west to control the villages between COP Keating and the Afghan village of Saret Koheh. Extending control further along the river was expected to counter the AAF expansion and activity in the summer of 2007. The AAF responded to this advance with a well-organized ambush on July 26, 2007, in the river valley at Saret Koheh. AAF forces involved fit the pattern of the improved force, in that they were uniformed and equipped as Afghan Army and police forces, with the latest weapons and radios issued to government Afghan forces, along with ski masks. They made sustained attacks over a two-day period, drawing American support forces and widespread air forces into the battle. Despite air and artillery support the American forces suffered significant losses. Captain Bostick was killed by a rocket propelled grenade. Staff Sergeant William "Ryan" Fritsche was killed by rifle fire. Seven other Americans and one ANA soldier were wounded.

The Battle of Saret Koheh made good on the threats of the "Night Letter". It also showed Lieutenant Colonel Chris Kolenda (commander of American forces in Naray) with a crisis. AAF operations were expanding, supported by Taliban organizations in Pakistan. American forces formed a thinly held and poorly supplied picket line from Naray to Kamdesh along the river. The American forces were too outnumbered to survive sustained combat. Something had to be done to bring Nuristan on to the American side. The first effort was made by First Lieutenant Dave Roller. He decided that American soldiers' "battle rattle" war gear gave the impression of soulless killing machines. Encased in armor, helmets, and weapons, Americans appeared to be looking for a fight. Roller attended his next meeting with village leaders dressed in a T-shirt and shorts. He discussed their common values as leaders of families and communities working toward a better future. Mawlawi Abdul Rahman was a local elder impressed with this new approach. He began building a consensus of village elders in support of the Afghan government. Through the summer and fall of 2008, Captain Joey Hutto, COP Keating's new commander, expanded this initiative. Hutto had worked for years on COIN campaigns in Central America.

==== The Hundred Man Shura ====
By October 2007 the elders and mullahs of the Kamdesh area had been inspired by Rahman to gather at Kamdesh for a mass meeting, or shura, to plan the future of Nuristan. This series of meetings over two days involved more than 800 representatives of the people of Nuristan, and had the goal of bringing order and economic development to the region. The village leaders elected a representative council of 100 members to form a shura that would produce a regional security plan and obtain an agreement with the American military and the Afghan Karzai government. This agreement would recognize the authority of the Hundred Man Shura, and provide funds for economic development. Formalized as "The Commitment of Mutual Support" the agreement also provided the Shura would provide local security in return for an end to uninvited American military searches of local towns and mosques. From November through January 2008 members of the Shura traveled the villages of the Kamdesh area, informing the residents of the support agreement and stating that the era of holy war was over, and that local government would bring peace and prosperity. This agreement did bring down the level of combat in the Kamdesh area. In the year that followed the agreement, ANA and American deaths dropped from thirty to three.

The shura began to falter by October 2008. The initiating ISAF forces of 1-91 Cavalry had returned home, replaced by 6th Squadron, 4th Cavalry Regiment, 3rd Brigade Combat Team, 1st Infantry Division. On October 28, the commander of COP Keating, Captain Robert J. Yllescas, was severely wounded in a targeted assassination attempt with a remotely detonated IED less than 400 meters from the outpost—he later died from his wounds on December 1. The assassin was later found in Urmul and appeared to have the assistance of one of the Afghan day laborers at Camp Keating and the acquiescence of Urmul's elders. Yllescas's charismatic relations with the Shura had supported the transition from 1-91 Cavalry to 6th Squadron, and the Shura's influence and collaboration with ISAF forces declined from this point.

==== Final operations ====
COP Keating became increasingly isolated in the summer of 2009. Ground resupply became almost impossible due to the area's limited roads and the threat of insurgent attacks. Furthermore, Camp Keating's location, surrounded by mountains on three sides, exposed helicopters and the outpost's garrison to insurgent fire. Towards the end, resupply flights were limited to moonless nights when near total darkness offered some protection to helicopter crews and their craft. The nearest attack helicopters were located in Jalalabad, a thirty-minute flight away.

OP Fritsche was established to provide overwatch for COP Keating and was manned by a mix of US and Afghan national forces. US Army soldiers at both outposts had been ordered to prepare to evacuate the outposts and had informed local Afghan leaders of their intention to do so.

Bravo Troop, 3rd Squadron "Destroyers", 61st Cavalry Regiment manned COP Keating. In addition, Afghan national forces manned checkpoints and roadblocks at various locations around the area. At the time, Afghan national forces were supervised and trained by members of the Latvian Operational Mentor Liaison Teams.

The Coalition planned to close COP Keating by August 2009, but the move was delayed because of other military operations in a nearby district. Because Keating was scheduled for closure in the near future, coalition leaders had decided not to make more than minimal efforts to improve fortifications at the base.

Coalition forces received three human-source intelligence reports sometime before the battle indicating that insurgents were planning an attack on the outposts. Because the reports had not been verified by other intelligence sources, such as electronic intelligence, the reports were discounted.

== Battle ==
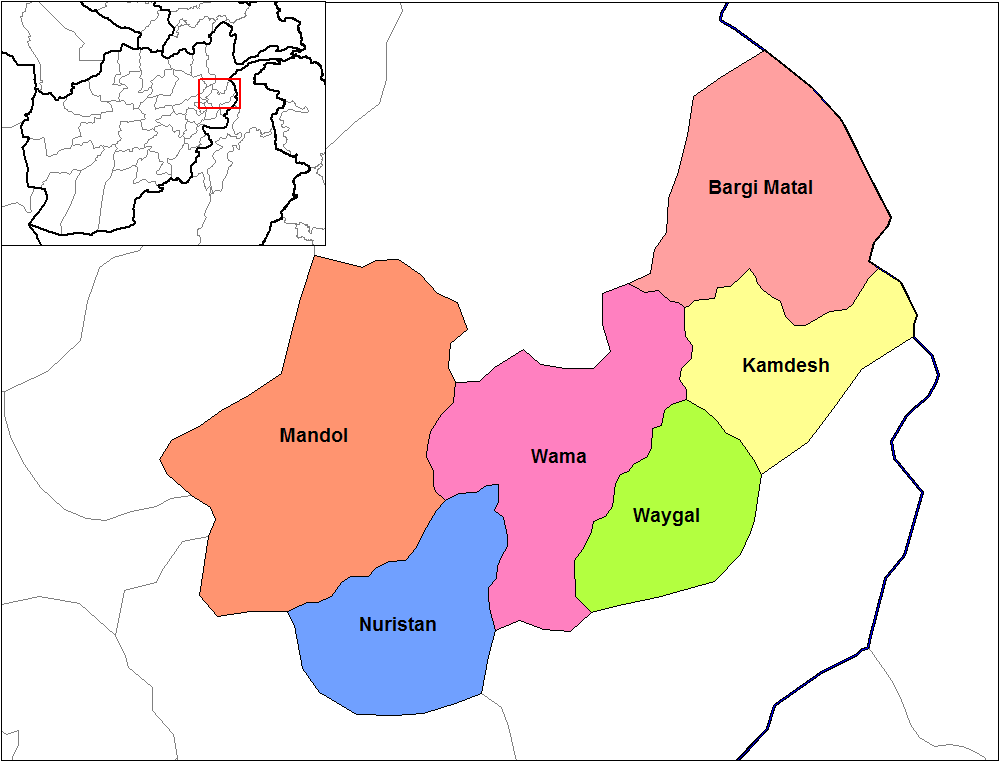
Kamdesh District in the Nuristan Province in Afghanistan

At about 3:00 a.m. on October 3, over 150 Taliban-backed insurgents ordered all Kamdesh villagers to leave the area. At 6:00 a.m, the fighters opened fire from all sides of the outpost with mortars and rocket-propelled grenades, immediately putting the Americans' mortar pit out of action. Within two minutes of the beginning of the attack, American forces suffered their first casualty. Observation Post Fritsche was attacked simultaneously, limiting available support from that position. Coalition forces responded with small arms fire, mortars, and by the afternoon, helicopters, heavy artillery, and airstrikes.

The attackers overran Keating's perimeter defenses about 48 minutes into the battle. Breaches occurred at a latrine area close to the perimeter wire; also the main entrance where civilian Afghan security guards were overwhelmed; and from the eastern side—where Afghan National Army soldiers were stationed. Despite the efforts of two Latvian military advisors, First Sergeant Jānis Laķis and Corporal Mārtiņš Dāboliņš, who tried to convince the Afghan National Army forces not to flee, the Afghan defenders quickly broke and ran. U.S. soldiers reported that none of the Afghan soldiers held their ground. During and after the battle, some of the Afghan soldiers stole items, including digital cameras and protein drinks, belonging to American soldiers at the base.

Once inside, the attackers set fire to the base, burning down most of the barracks. Within the first hour, the American and Latvian defenders had collapsed to a tight internal perimeter, centered on the two buildings that were not burning. Regrouping there, they pushed out teams to retake much of the outpost. They expanded the perimeter all the way back to the entry control point and to the buildings on the western edge of the outpost, which became their final fighting position. U.S. air support directed by Sgt. Armando Avalos, Sgt. Jayson Souter, and 1st Lt. Cason Shrode, including attack helicopters, A-10s, a B-1 bomber, and F-15 fighters, destroyed the local mosque, where much of the insurgents' heaviest fire originated. Once OP Fritsche soldiers gained control of their mortar pit, Sgt. Avalos began directing indirect support to help the defense of COP Keating. Two USAF F-15E fighter bombers circled overhead, led by Captains Mike Polidor and Aaron Dove and their wingmen, 1st Lt. Justin Pavoni and Captain Ryan Bone, for almost eight hours, helping coordinate airstrikes by 19 other aircraft.

The insurgents began to retreat later in the day. Quick reaction forces (QRF) from 1st Battalion, 32nd Infantry Regiment did not reach the outpost until 7:00 pm that day, while insurgents remained in parts of the outpost as late as 5:10 pm. Relief had been slowed in reaching COP Keating due to a lack of available aircraft and density of terrain. Members of 10th Mountain Division's 1-32 Infantry Regiment were air lifted to the nearest helicopter landing zone on OP Fritsche and arrived at approximately 2:00 pm, as recalled by a soldier on scene. After assisting with securing the OP from potential follow on attacks, members of the Quick Reaction Force descended from the mountain's peak to COP Keating on foot. While en route the Platoon encountered a planned ambush on the side of the mountain resulting in three confirmed enemy KIA at approximately 6:00 pm. After dispensing with the enemy, QRF continued their descent and entered the outpost at approximately 7:00 pm. At such time the platoon cleared the remaining areas of the outpost which members of 3-61 had not yet retaken. Within moments of entry, members of the QRF discovered and confirmed the death of Sgt. Joshua Hardt, who until this time had been MIA. Follow-up attacks attempted by Taliban forces were subsequently thwarted by U.S. aircraft.

=== List of American fatalities ===
Name	Date of birth	Place of birth	Experience	Cause of death
SSG Justin Timothy Gallegos	January 24, 1982	Tucson, Arizona	Served with United States Army since 2003 and participated in Iraq War	Killed by a single gunshot wound in the head
SGT Christopher Todd Griffin	April 10, 1985	Kincheloe, Michigan	Served with United States Army since 2004 and participated in Iraq War	Killed by multiple gunshot wounds in the head and body
SGT Joshua Mitchell Hardt	September 6, 1985	Manteca, California	Served with United States Army since 2006 and participated in Iraq War	Killed by multiple gunshot and RPG wounds in the head and upper body.
SGT Joshua John Kirk	July 19, 1979	Thomaston, Maine	Served with United States Army since 2005	Shot in the head by a Taliban sniper after being wounded by RPG fire.
SPC Stephan Lee Mace	April 11, 1988	Lovettsville, Virginia	Served with United States Army since 2008	Died of his wounds after his legs were hit by RPG shrapnel.
SSG Vernon William Martin	March 20, 1984	Brooklyn, New York City	Served with United States Army since 2004 and participated in Iraq War	Died of his wounds after his leg was hit by a single gunshot wound.
SGT Michael Patrick Scusa	October 5, 1986	Villas, New Jersey	Served with United States Army since 2005 and participated in Iraq War	Shot in the neck by a Taliban sniper.
PFC Kevin Christopher Thomson	February 11, 1987	San Mateo County, California	Served with United States Army since 2008	Killed by a single gunshot wound to the face while in the base mortar pit.
SPC Ed Faulkner Jr	July 6, 1983	Burlington, North Carolina	Served with United States Army since 2005 and participated in Iraq War	Died from drug overdose while battling post traumatic stress in September 2010.

== Aftermath ==
Eight U.S. soldiers were killed and 27 wounded; eight Afghan soldiers were wounded, along with two Afghan private security guards. One U.S. soldier died from a drug overdose in 2010 dealing with PTSD attributed from the battle.

American forces had already planned to pull out of the area as part of a plan to move forces to more densely populated areas, so closure of the base was imminent when the attack occurred. The attack accelerated those plans, with the troops' departure taking place so quickly after the battle that some munitions were abandoned. The outpost's depot was promptly looted by the insurgents and bombed on October 6 by a B-1 bomber in an effort to destroy the lethal munitions left behind.

On October 5 and 6, Coalition troops conducted operations in the area in an attempt to locate and destroy the Taliban forces responsible for the attack on the outposts. Another 10 Afghan soldiers, coalition troops, and several Taliban were killed during these operations.

=== Investigation ===
Following the battle, the U.S. Central Command conducted an investigation on what had occurred, led by US Army General Guy Swan. The report, released to the public in June 2011, concluded "inadequate measures taken by the chain of command" facilitated the attack, but praised the troops fighting at the base for repulsing the attack "with conspicuous gallantry, courage and bravery." Four U.S. Army officers—Captain Melvin Porter, Captain Stoney Portis, Lieutenant Colonel Robert Brown, and Colonel Randy George—who oversaw COP Keating were admonished or reprimanded for command failures. In the report released to the public, the U.S. Army concealed the names of the four disciplined officers.

== Decorations ==
Twenty-seven soldiers were awarded the Purple Heart for wounds sustained in combat. Thirty-seven soldiers were awarded the Army Commendation Medal with "V" device for valor. 3 soldiers were awarded the Bronze Star Medal, and 18 others the Bronze Star Medal with "V" device for valor. Nine soldiers were awarded the Silver Star for valor. Staff Sgt. Justin Gallegos' Silver Star was later upgraded to a Distinguished Service Cross. 1st Lt. Andrew Bundermann's Silver Star was upgraded to a Distinguished Service Cross as well.

The flight crews of three United States Army AH-64D Apache helicopters were later decorated for actions during the battle. Captain Matthew Kaplan, CW3 Ross Lewallen, CW3 Randy Huff, CW2 Gary Wingert, CW2 Chad Bardwell, and CW2 Chris Wright were awarded the Distinguished Flying Cross for conducting close combat attacks on the Taliban during the battle. Capt. Michael Polidor and Capt. Aaron Dove, pilot and weapon systems officer of one of the F-15E aircraft coordinating close air support, were also awarded the Distinguished Flying Cross.

=== Medals of Honor ===
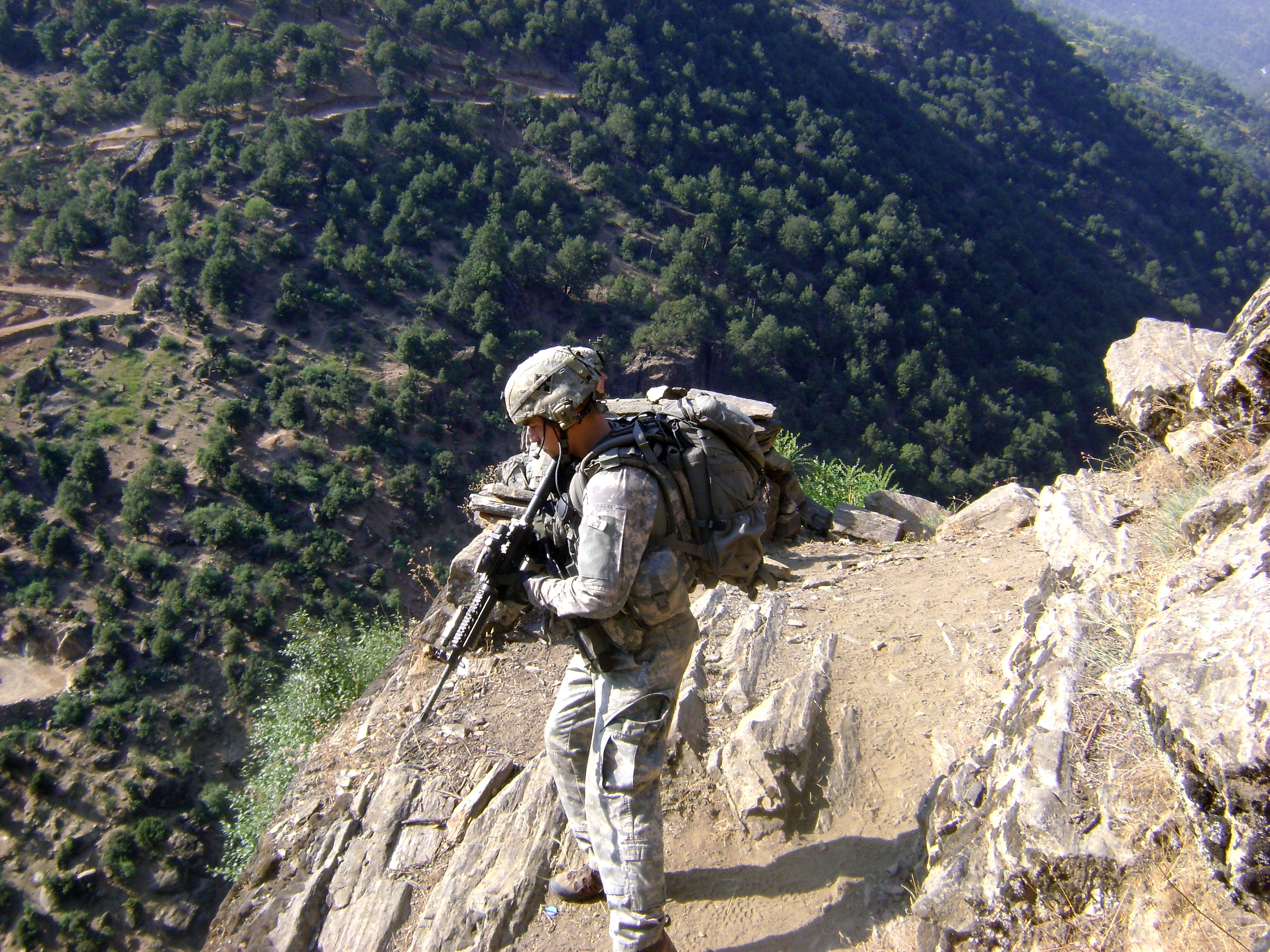
U.S. Army Staff Sgt. Clinton L. Romesha patrols near Combat Outpost Keating in Kamdesh, Nuristan Province, Afghanistan, 27 July 2009.

- On 11 February 2013, President Barack Obama presented the Medal of Honor to Staff Sergeant Clinton Romesha, a survivor of the battle. He became the fourth surviving soldier from the Iraq and Afghanistan conflicts to be awarded the Medal of Honor due to courageous actions during the battle.
- On 26 August 2013 Staff Sergeant Ty Carter (then Specialist) was also awarded the Medal of Honor for his courage during the battle.

== In popular culture ==
The battle of Kamdesh is documented in the 2017 book Red Platoon: A True Story of American Valor by Clinton Romesha, a former United States Army soldier who received the Medal of Honor for his actions during the battle for Combat Outpost Keating in Nuristan, Afghanistan. The battle is also the main focal point of the 2020 film The Outpost, which was in-turn based on the book The Outpost: An Untold Story of American Valor by Jake Tapper. The Netflix documentary series, Medal of Honor, includes an episode detailing the actions of Clinton Romesha and Ty Carter.

== See also ==
- Battle for Hill 3234
- Battle of Wanat
