= Clinton Romesha =

United States Army Medal of Honor recipient

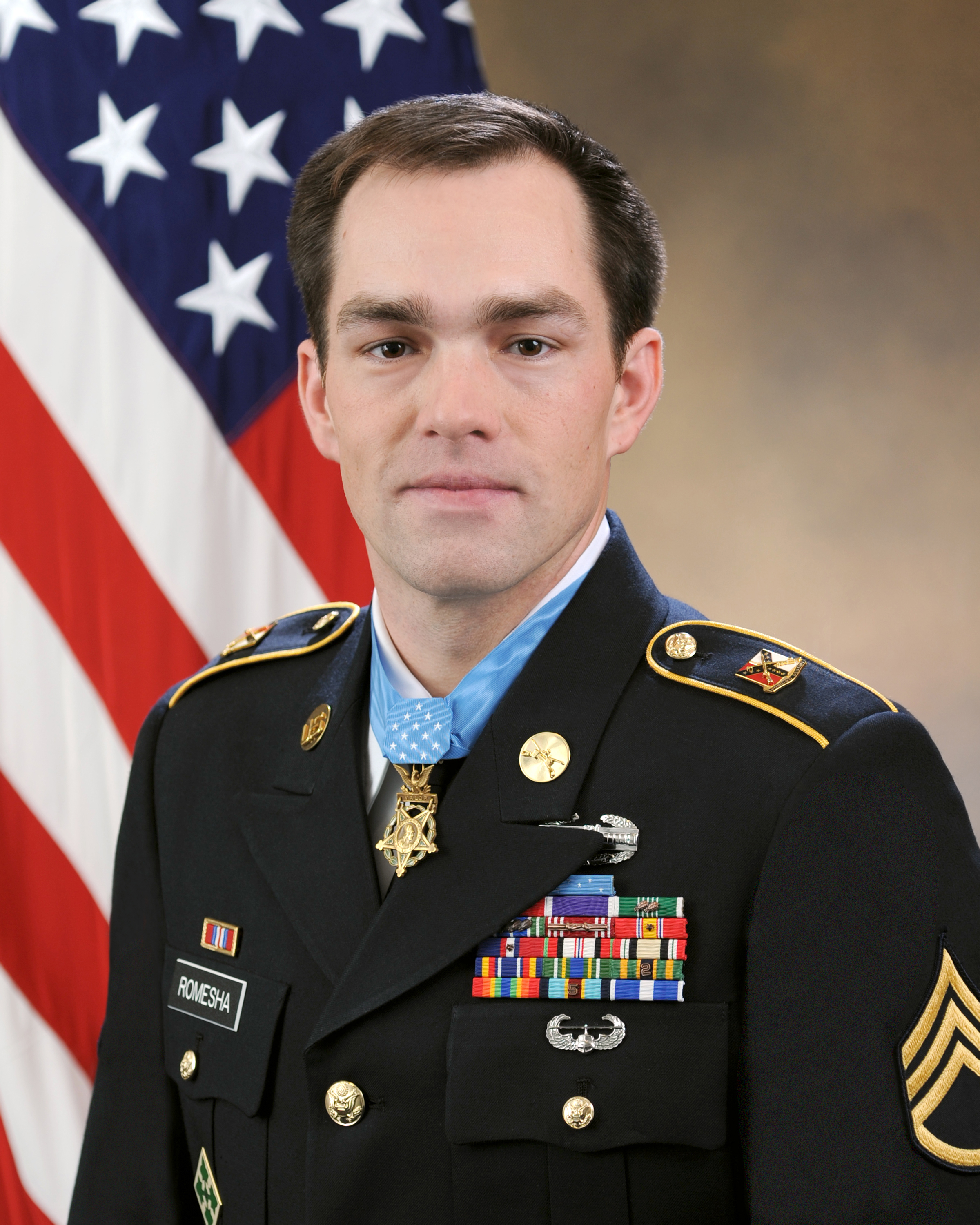
- Romesha in 2013
- Born: August 17, 1981 (age 45); Lake City, Modoc County, California
- Spouse: Tamara Romesha (m. 2000)
- Military career
- Allegiance: United States
- Branch: United States Army
- Service years: 1999–2011
- Rank: Staff Sergeant
- Nicknames: "Clint" "Ro"
- Units: 63rd Armor Regiment, 1st Infantry Division; 72nd Armor Regiment, 2nd Infantry Division; 61st Cavalry Regiment, 4th Infantry Division
- Conflicts: Kosovo War; Iraq War; War in Afghanistan: Battle of Kamdesh
- Awards: Medal of Honor; Bronze Star Medal; Purple Heart
- Other work: Field safety specialist

Clinton LaVor Romesha (/ˈroʊməʃeɪ/; born August 17, 1981) is a retired United States Army soldier who received the Medal of Honor for his actions during the Battle of Kamdesh in 2009 during the War in Afghanistan.

Born into a family with a strong military background, Romesha joined the United States Army in 1999, and was posted at various times in Germany, South Korea and Colorado. Serving as an M1 Abrams tank crewman and a Cavalry Scout, Romesha had seen four deployments, including to Kosovo, Iraq twice, and Afghanistan. On October 3, 2009, he was assigned to the 3rd Squadron, 61st Cavalry Regiment, 4th Brigade Combat Team, 4th Infantry Division, deployed to Combat Outpost Keating in eastern Afghanistan. When a force of 300 Taliban insurgents attacked the base, Romesha was credited with rallying his comrades and leading the counterattack, directing close air support and providing suppressive fire to help the wounded to an aid station. Despite being wounded, Romesha continued to fight through the 12-hour battle.

Romesha left the U.S. Army in 2011 to spend more time with his family. He later took a job in the oil industry in North Dakota. On February 11, 2013, he received the Medal of Honor from President Barack Obama.

== Early life and education ==
Romesha was born on August 17, 1981 in Lake City, Modoc County, California, to a family with a strong military background. His maternal grandfather, Aury Smith, is a World War II veteran who fought in the Battle of Normandy. Romesha grew up in Lake City, where he developed an avid love of ice hockey.

His father, Gary, is a Vietnam War veteran who later became a church leader in the Church of Jesus Christ of Latter-day Saints. Romesha is the fourth of five siblings, including two brothers who also joined the military. He is a member of The Church of Jesus Christ of Latter-day Saints and attended seminary for four years during high school but ultimately decided not to become a missionary for the church as his family had hoped he would. In 1999, Romesha graduated from Surprise Valley High School in Cedarville, California.

== Military career ==
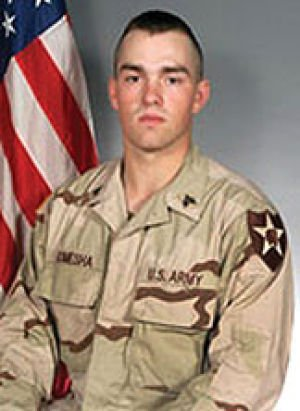
Romesha while assigned to the 2nd Infantry Division

Romesha enlisted in the United States Army in September 1999 and underwent Basic Combat Training and later Advanced Individual Training at Fort Knox, Kentucky. Trained to be an armor crewman for the M1 Abrams tank, Romesha was first assigned as a tank gunner in Company B, 1st Battalion, 63d Armor Regiment, 2d Brigade, 1st Infantry Division, and posted at Rose Barracks, Germany. During this posting he deployed to Kosovo as part of the Kosovo Force. His next assignment was as a gunner/assistant tank commander with Company A, 2nd Battalion, 72d Armor Regiment, 2nd Infantry Division at Camp Casey, South Korea. After a former mentor was killed in Iraq, Romesha volunteered for a tour supporting Operation Iraqi Freedom when parts of his unit received redeployment orders.

Next, Romesha was assigned as section leader with Troop B, 3d Squadron, 61st Cavalry Regiment, 4th Brigade Combat Team, 4th Infantry Division at Fort Carson, Colorado. There, he completed the Long Range Reconnaissance Course, the Advanced Leader Course, and Air Assault Training. Trained as a Cavalry Scout, Romesha saw his second deployment to Iraq in this unit.

In May 2009, Romesha's unit deployed to Afghanistan for Operation Enduring Freedom. His unit was assigned to Combat Outpost Keating in the Kamdesh District, Nuristan Province in Eastern Afghanistan. It replaced the outgoing Blackfoot Troop, 6th Squadron 4th Cavalry Regiment, 3rd Brigade, 1st Infantry Division (Task Force Duke) at the remote outpost in the mountains of a semiautonomous area of the country. Keating was located in a valley surrounded by steep mountains, and over the course of the deployment, it came under attack regularly. United States commanders opted to close the outpost by October 2009, considering it indefensible.

During deployment, Romesha was given the nickname "Ro" by his comrades. He was noted for his sense of humor and calm temperament in the difficult deployment.

=== Medal of Honor action ===
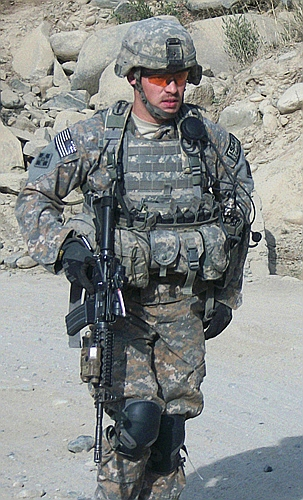
Romesha in Afghanistan in 2009

On October 3, 2009, according to a report published by United States Army historian Richard S. Lowry, Taliban fighters launched a coordinated attack on the outpost from three sides at about 06:00, capturing its ammunition depot. Some 300 fighters participated in the attack armed with a recoilless rifle, rocket-propelled grenades, mortars, machine guns, and small arms, heavily outnumbering the International Security Assistance Force (ISAF) presence of about 85 United States Army, Afghan National Army and Latvian Army soldiers, of which the 35 Afghan soldiers later abandoned their positions. It would later be known as the Battle of Kamdesh.

During the first three hours of the fight, the United States troops remained under intense mortar and small arms fire, before the Taliban fighters breached the compound and set fire to it. Romesha moved under heavy fire to reconnoiter the area and seek reinforcements from a nearby barracks, helping the ISAF troops to regroup and fight despite being targeted by a Taliban sniper. Romesha led the firefight to reclaim the depot, organizing a five-man team to counterattack while still under fire. He then neutralized one of the Taliban fighters' machine gun teams. While engaging a second, he took cover behind a generator which was struck by a rocket propelled grenade, and Romesha was wounded in the neck, shoulder and arms by shrapnel. Despite being wounded, Romesha directed air support that killed an estimated 30 Taliban and then took out several more Taliban positions himself. He provided suppressing fire to allow three other wounded American soldiers to reach an aid station and then recovered several American casualties while still under fire. Romesha's efforts allowed the troops to regroup and fight off a force superior in numbers. The fight lasted 12 hours, and eight American soldiers were killed, making the engagement one of the costliest for ISAF during the war. Nine soldiers were decorated with Silver Star Medals for the fight. Several days later, ISAF withdrew from the post.

Romesha received the award from President Barack Obama in an award ceremony at the White House on 11 February 2013. He is the fourth living Medal of Honor recipient for the wars in Afghanistan and Iraq (following Salvatore Giunta, Leroy Petry, and Dakota Meyer), and the eleventh overall for these campaigns.

=== Post-military life ===
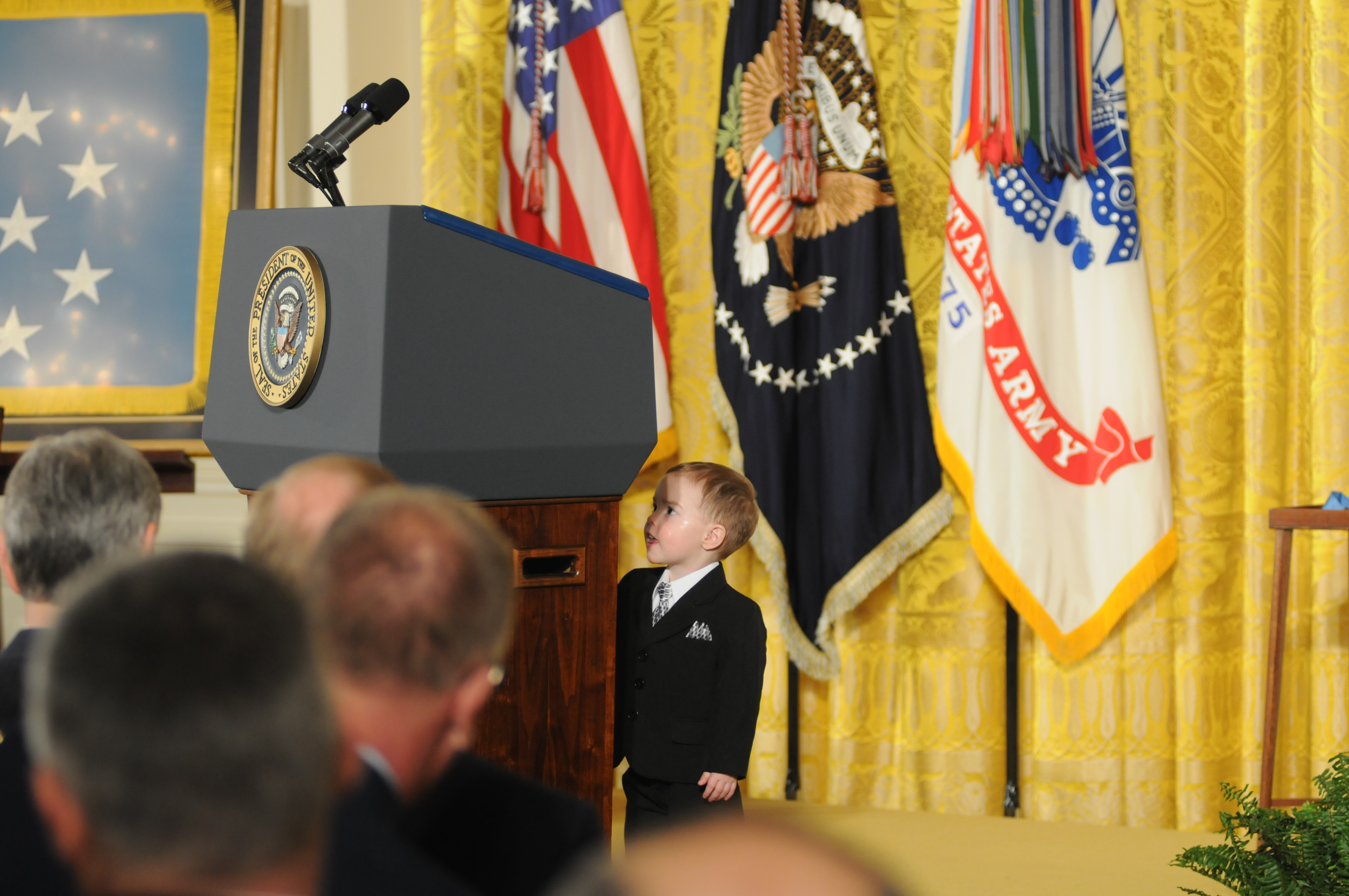
In advance of February 11, 2013 Medal of Honor ceremony in the East Room of the White House, Clinton Romesha's son, Colin, inspects the lectern that would later be used by President Barack Obama.

Romesha was only able to contact his wife Tammy four days after the battle, and later noted she was greatly upset when hearing the full story of his actions at Kamdesh. In an interview later with Soldiers Live, Romesha said he felt he "was being selfish and not being fair" having volunteered for so many deployments away from his wife and children. Following the Afghanistan deployment, Romesha went through the Army Career and Alumni Program in preparation to separate from the army. On April 4, 2011, Romesha left the military in order to spend more time with his family.

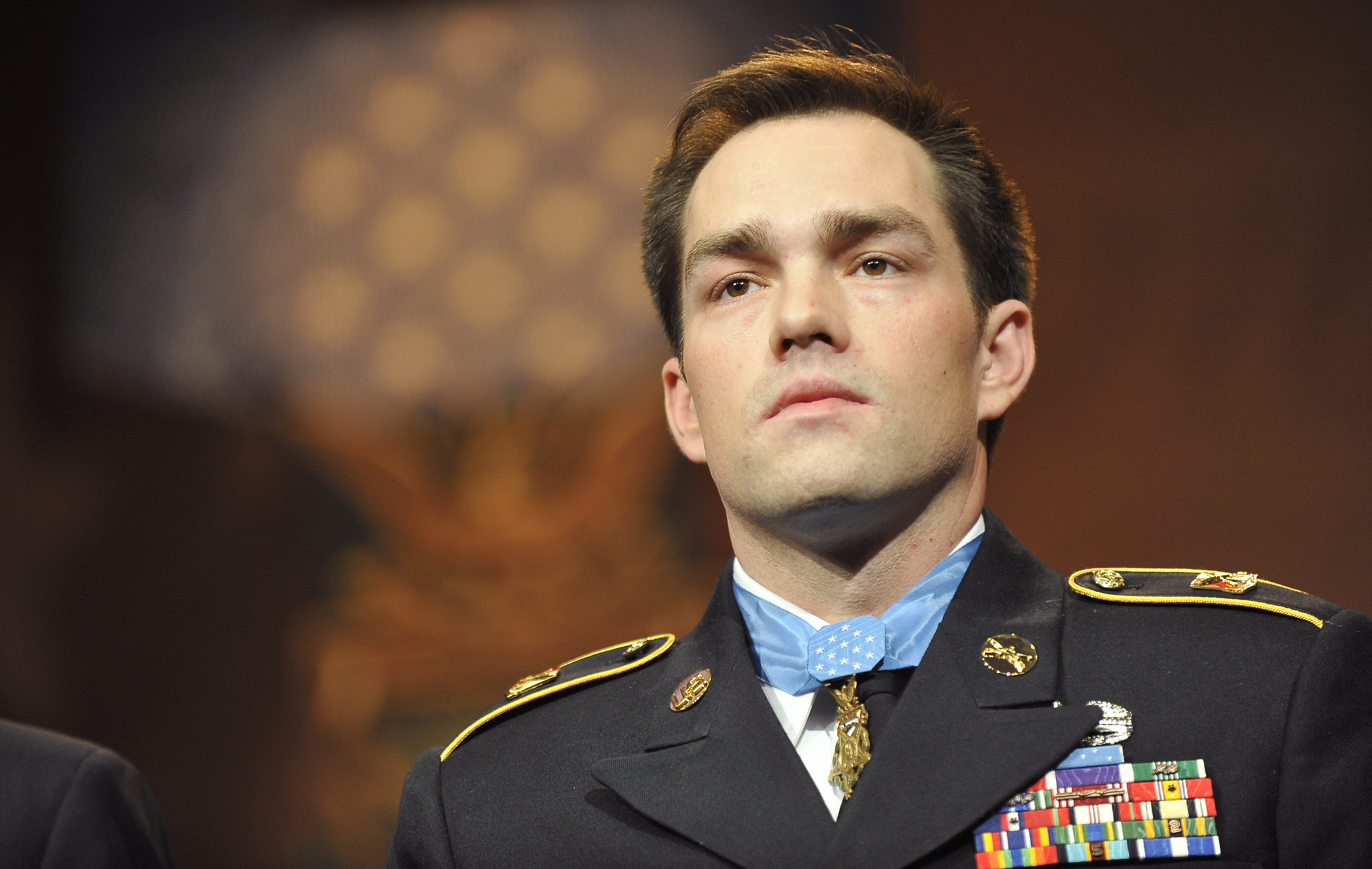
Romesha stands as he is recognized during a ceremony at The Pentagon.

Following military service, Romesha moved to North Dakota, where his sister lived, to look for a job in the oil industry. He settled in Minot and purchased a 100-year-old, flood-damaged home that he is restoring himself. He took a job at KS Industries, an oil field construction firm. Initially crewing a hydro excavation truck, he went through a driver's training program and later began managing the crews of six other trucks. He currently works as a field safety specialist for KS Industries. His exploits during the firefight were later written about by journalist Jake Tapper in his book, The Outpost.

In a press conference on January 16, 2013, shortly after being notified he would receive the medal, Romesha played down his actions in the conflict, noting many other veterans who had received more serious injuries in the battle. Romesha noted that he did not suffer post-traumatic stress disorder or other lasting psychological injuries from deployment, but that others he knew during the deployment did.

On February 11, 2013, Romesha received the Medal of Honor at a ceremony held at the White House. After receiving the award, when speaking to the press wearing his Stetson, Romesha stated he felt "conflicted" about receiving the medal due to the loss of those who died while serving with him.

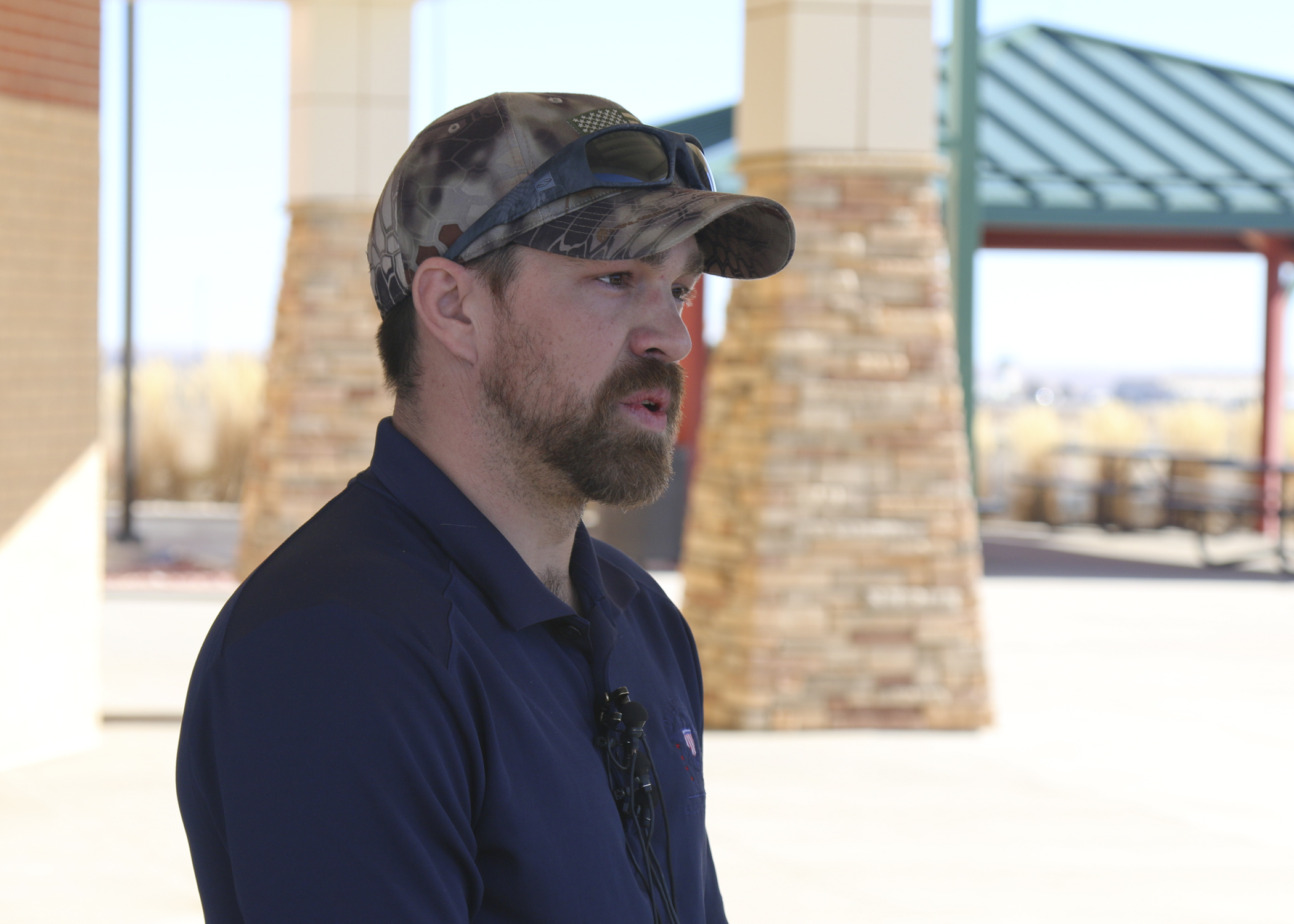
Romesha at the Wilderness Dining Facility, on Fort Carson, in January 2015.

In the days following the award, Romesha was recognized in a number of other events. He was inducted into The Pentagon's "Hall of Heroes" on February 12, and traveled to New York City on February 17 to visit with the cast of Spider-Man: Turn Off the Dark on Broadway, hosted by the USO. He was recognized by Governor of North Dakota Jack Dalrymple in an event at the North Dakota State Capitol on February 21, 2013. On March 2, Romesha spoke at the military ball of the ROTC program at University of North Dakota. Since then Romesha keeps the Medal of Honor on him. It has some tarnish and wrinkles on it from being carried everywhere, shown to and handled by many.

In 2016, Romesha's book Red Platoon was published recounting the Battle of Kamdesh. That same year the rights to a movie based on the book were optioned by Sony Pictures; by December 2017 a script had been written and a director was assigned to the film. Romesha, along with a dozen other veterans, starred in the veteran based zombie film Range 15, portraying fictional versions of themselves.

In December 2017, Romesha and retired Captain Florent Groberg, another Medal of Honor recipient, donated their original Medals of Honor to the 4th Infantry Division, saying "This medal is too big for us." Romesha was not in attendance at the turnover ceremony.

In 2018, Romesha endorsed Republican Kevin Cramer in the 2018 United States Senate election in North Dakota.

== Personal life ==
Romesha married his wife Tamara on February 13, 2000. They met in junior high school and began dating several years later.

Due to his military service, the couple spent about 10 years apart from each other. The couple have three children: Dessi, Gwen, and Colin. Friends describe Romesha as having a sense of humor and being "intense, short and wiry." As of May 2016, the Romeshas live in Minot, North Dakota.

In October 2024, Romesha joined 15 other Medal of Honor recipients in publicly endorsing Donald Trump for president.

== Bibliography ==
- Red Platoon: a True Story of American Valor. Dutton, 2016. ISBN 0525955054

== Awards and decorations ==
During his military career, Romesha received a number of decorations. He is authorized to wear three service stripes, six Overseas Service Bars, as well as the former wartime service Combat Service Identification Badge for the 2nd Infantry Division and the 4th Infantry Division and the Distinctive Unit Insignia of the 61st Cavalry Regiment. Romesha's military decorations include the following awards:

Right breast		Left breast		
Valorous Unit Award	Meritorious Unit Commendation			
Valorous Unit Award	Meritorious Unit Commendation	Combat Action Badge		
Valorous Unit Award	Meritorious Unit Commendation	Medal of Honor		
Valorous Unit Award	Meritorious Unit Commendation	Bronze Star Medal	Purple Heart Medal	Army Commendation Medal w/ two Oak Leaf Clusters
Valorous Unit Award	Meritorious Unit Commendation	Army Achievement Medal w/ four Oak Leaf Clusters	Army Good Conduct Medal w/ three bronze loops	National Defense Service Medal
Valorous Unit Award	Meritorious Unit Commendation	Kosovo Campaign Medal w/ service star	Afghanistan Campaign Medal w/ two service stars	Iraq Campaign Medal w/ three service stars
Valorous Unit Award	Meritorious Unit Commendation	Global War on Terrorism Expeditionary Medal w/ service star	Korea Defense Service Medal	NCO Professional Development Ribbon w/ award numeral 2
Valorous Unit Award	Meritorious Unit Commendation	Army Service Ribbon	Army Overseas Service Ribbon w/ award numeral 5	NATO Medal for Kosovo w/ two service stars
Valorous Unit Award	Meritorious Unit Commendation	Air Assault Badge		

=== Medal of Honor citation ===
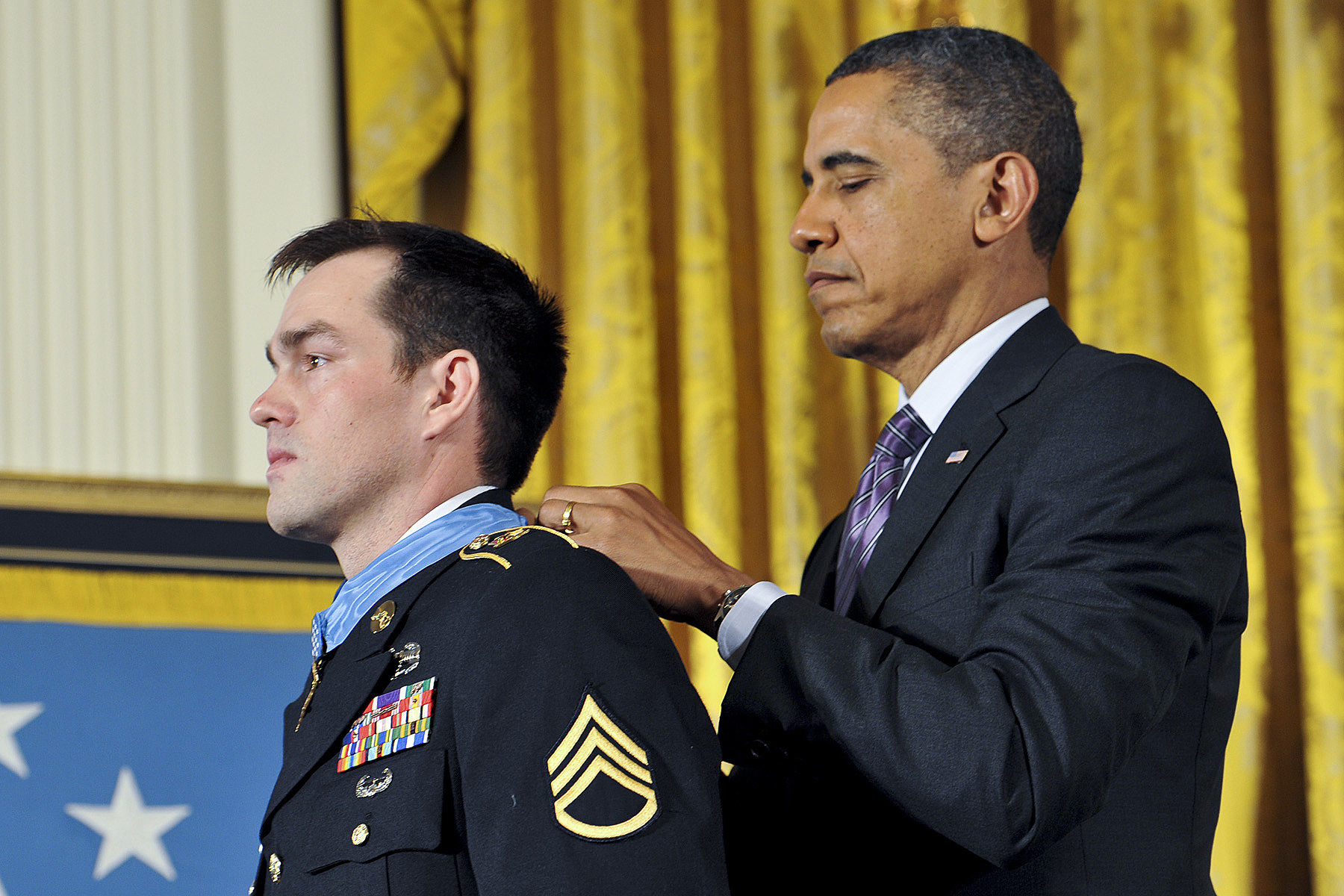
President Barack Obama awards the Medal of Honor to Romesha

Staff Sergeant Clinton L. Romesha distinguished himself by acts of gallantry and intrepidity at the risk of his life above and beyond the call of duty while serving as a Section Leader with Bravo Troop, 3d Squadron, 61st Cavalry Regiment, 4th Brigade Combat Team, 4th Infantry Division, during combat operations against an armed enemy at Combat Outpost Keating, Kamdesh District, Nuristan Province, Afghanistan on October 3, 2009. On that morning, Staff Sergeant Romesha and his comrades awakened to an attack by an estimated 300 enemy fighters occupying the high ground on all four sides of the complex, employing concentrated fire from recoilless rifles, rocket propelled grenades, anti-aircraft machine guns, mortars and small arms fire. Staff Sergeant Romesha moved uncovered under intense enemy fire to conduct a reconnaissance of the battlefield and seek reinforcements from the barracks before returning to action with the support of an assistant gunner. Staff Sergeant Romesha took out an enemy machine gun team and, while engaging a second, the generator he was using for cover was struck by a rocket-propelled grenade, inflicting him with shrapnel wounds. Undeterred by his injuries, Staff Sergeant Romesha continued to fight and upon the arrival of another soldier to aid him and the assistant gunner, he again rushed through the exposed avenue to assemble additional soldiers. Staff Sergeant Romesha then mobilized a five-man team and returned to the fight equipped with a sniper rifle. With complete disregard for his own safety, Staff Sergeant Romesha continually exposed himself to heavy enemy fire, as he moved confidently about the battlefield engaging and destroying multiple enemy targets, including three Taliban fighters who had breached the combat outpost's perimeter. While orchestrating a successful plan to secure and reinforce key points of the battlefield, Staff Sergeant Romesha maintained radio communication with the tactical operations center. As the enemy forces attacked with even greater ferocity, unleashing a barrage of rocket-propelled grenades and recoilless rifle rounds, Staff Sergeant Romesha identified the point of attack and directed air support to destroy over 30 enemy fighters. After receiving reports that seriously injured Soldiers were at a distant battle position, Staff Sergeant Romesha and his team provided covering fire to allow the injured Soldiers to safely reach the aid station. Upon receipt of orders to proceed to the next objective, his team pushed forward 100 meters under overwhelming enemy fire to recover and prevent the enemy fighters from taking the bodies of their fallen comrades. Staff Sergeant Romesha's heroic actions throughout the day-long battle were critical in suppressing an enemy that had far greater numbers. His extraordinary efforts gave Bravo Troop the opportunity to regroup, reorganize and prepare for the counterattack that allowed the Troop to account for its personnel and secure Combat Outpost Keating. Staff Sergeant Romesha's discipline and extraordinary heroism above and beyond the call of duty reflect great credit upon himself, Bravo Troop, 3d Squadron, 61st Cavalry Regiment, 4th Brigade Combat Team, 4th Infantry Division and the United States Army.

== In popular culture ==
In 2018, he was portrayed by Paul Wesley in the Netflix anthology documentary miniseries Medal of Honor.

The film The Outpost, released on July 3, 2020, was based on the book The Outpost: An Untold Story of American Valor by Jake Tapper. It follows a series of events on the US military outpost Combat Outpost Keating in the Nurestan Province of Afghanistan leading to the Battle of Kamdesh on October 3, 2009. Romesha was portrayed by Scott Eastwood and Ty Carter was portrayed by Caleb Landry Jones.

== See also ==
- List of Post Vietnam Medal of Honor recipients
