= Ty Carter =

United States Army Medal of Honor recipient

- Carter c. 2013
- Born: January 25, 1980 (age 46); Spokane, Washington
- Military career
- Allegiance: United States
- Branch: United States Marine Corps; United States Army
- Service years: 1998–2002 (USMC); 2008–2014 (USA)
- Rank: Staff Sergeant
- Units: 61st Cavalry Regiment, 4th Infantry Division; 1st Cavalry Regiment, 2nd Infantry Division; 7th Infantry Division
- Conflicts: War in Afghanistan; Battle of Kamdesh
- Awards: Medal of Honor; Purple Heart; Meritorious Service Medal; Army Commendation Medal (5); Army Achievement Medal (3)
- Website: www.tymcartermoh.com

Ty Michael Carter (born January 25, 1980) is a retired United States Army staff sergeant and a Medal of Honor recipient. He was awarded the United States Armed Forces' highest military honor for his actions during the 2009 Battle of Kamdesh in Afghanistan. Carter left active duty in September 2014. Since his retirement, Carter has advocated for destigmatizing posttraumatic stress disorder.

== Military career ==
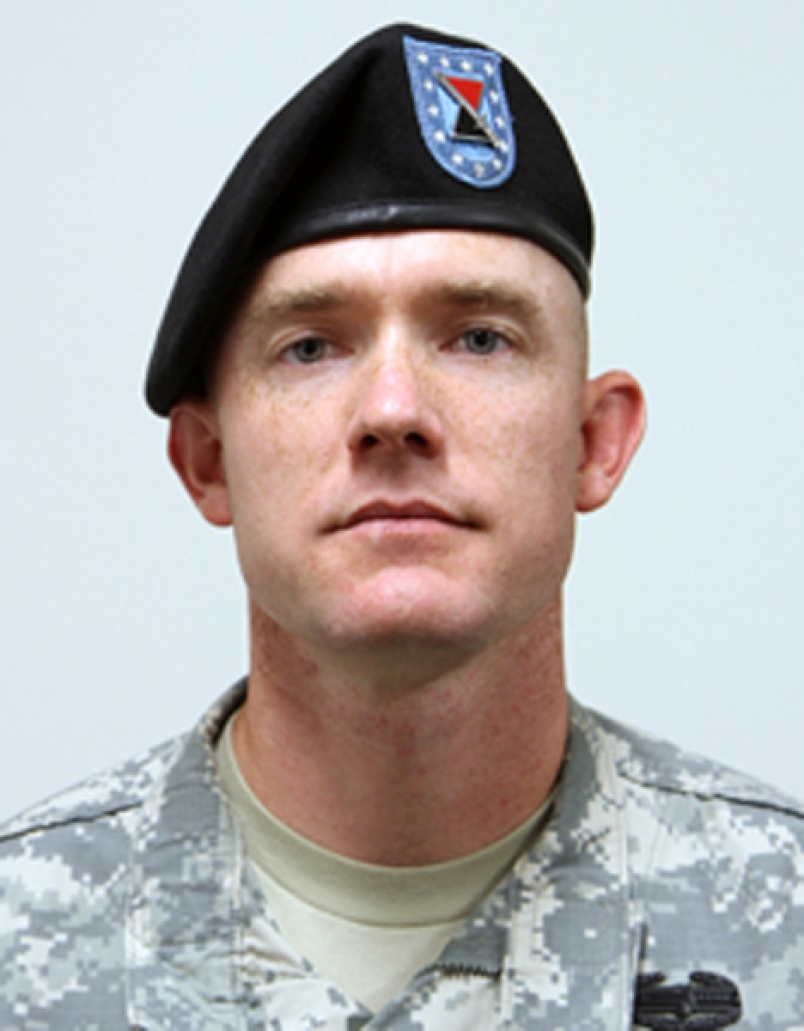
Carter in 2010

Carter enlisted in the United States Marine Corps October 13, 1998, and attended the Marine Corps Combat Engineer School. He later served in Okinawa, Japan, as an intelligence clerk. Carter showed promise in weapons’ marksmanship and was sent to Primary Marksmanship Instructor School in 1999. He served two short training deployments; one to San Clemente Island, California, and the other to Egypt, for Operation Bright Star. Carter was honorably discharged from the Marine Corps on 12 October 2002.

After his enlistment, Carter enrolled in college and studied biology at Los Medanos Community College in California where he met and began dating April Ait in early 2004. Ait soon became pregnant and they were married shortly thereafter. After the birth of their daughter Madison, some time traveling the United States, and subsequent divorce, Carter opted to join the United States Army.

Carter enlisted in the United States Army in January 2008 as a cavalry scout and received training at Fort Knox, Kentucky. From May 2009 to May 2010, he was deployed to Afghanistan with Bravo Troop, 3rd Squadron, 61st Cavalry Regiment, 4th Brigade Combat Team, 4th Infantry Division.

In October 2010, Carter was assigned as a Stryker gunner with the 8th Squadron, 1st Cavalry Regiment, 2nd Stryker Brigade Combat Team, 2nd Infantry Division at Joint Base Lewis-McChord, Washington. He was deployed to Afghanistan a second time in October 2012 and was thereafter stationed at Joint Base Lewis-McChord with the 7th Infantry Division. Carter works to destigmatize posttraumatic stress disorder (PTSD), which he prefers to be called "PTS", as he does not believe it should be termed a disorder. Carter has suffered from this condition. He left active duty in September 2014.

=== Medal of Honor action ===
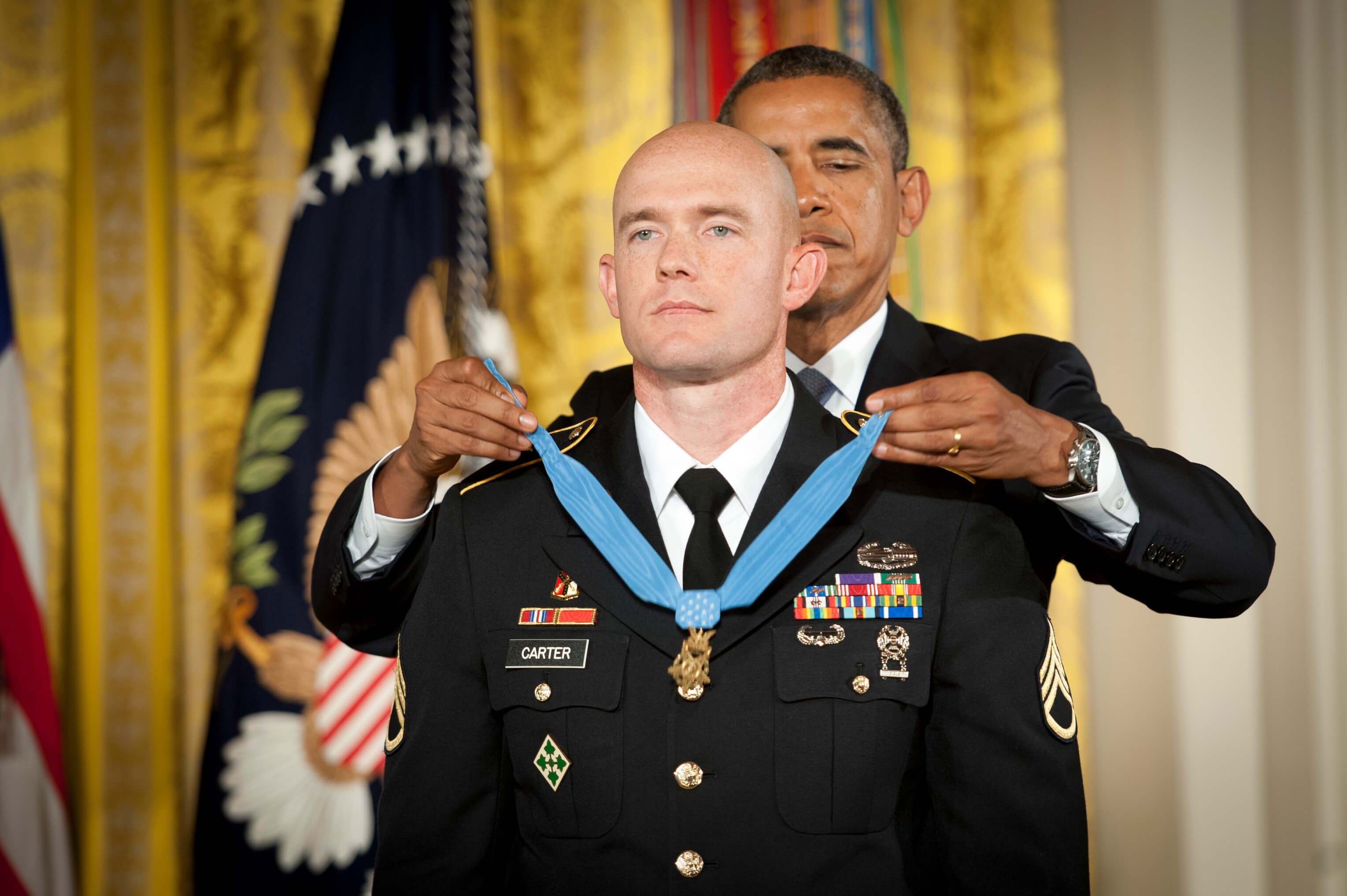
U.S. President Barack Obama places the Medal of Honor around Carter's neck during an August 26, 2013 White House ceremony.

While on his first deployment in Afghanistan, Carter was stationed at Combat Outpost (COP) Keating in Kamdesh District, Nuristan Province. On October 3, 2009, the outpost came under heavy attack and Carter, then a specialist, distinguished himself in what came to be known as the Battle of Kamdesh.

According to the detailed Official Narrative from the United States Army, more than 300 enemy fighters attacked COP Keating from surrounding high ground before 6 a.m. Under intense fire, Carter carried ammunition 100 meters across open ground from near his barracks to a Humvee at the south Battle Position, soon returning across the same distance to retrieve machine gun oil and more ammunition, and traverse that distance a third time to thus resupply the Battle Position. Though wounded within the first half-hour of battle, Carter provided accurate fire under intense pressure to drive back enemy that had infiltrated the camp perimeter. He then crawled under continuing fire to another vehicle, and retrieved needed weapons and ammunition to bring back to the Battle Position. Carter crossed 30 meters of open space to provide life-extending first aid to a wounded soldier, exposed to enemy fire, then carrying him back across the 30 meters to the Humvee. As the battle progressed, Carter ran toward the Tactical Operations Center (TOC) to coordinate reconnaissance and to obtain medical care for the wounded soldier, but, encountering the body of a fallen sergeant, found and retrieved a radio and returned to the Humvee. Carter found a litter, and with a comrade carried the wounded soldier 100 meters across the original distance to an aid station; it was then about noon. The battle extended through nightfall when reinforcements could safely land by helicopter, by which time almost two-thirds of the 53 Coalition soldiers had been killed (8) or wounded (>25).

President Barack Obama presented Carter the Medal of Honor in a White House ceremony on August 26, 2013. The following day, Carter was inducted into the Pentagon Hall of Heroes.

== Awards and decorations ==
During his military career, Carter received a number of decorations. Carter is authorized to wear two service stripes, three Overseas Service Bars, as well as the Combat Service Identification Badge for the 4th Infantry Division and the Distinctive Unit Insignia of the 61st Cavalry Regiment. Carter's military decorations include the following awards:

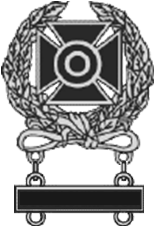

Right breast		Left breast		
Valorous Unit Award	Meritorious Unit Commendation			
Valorous Unit Award	Meritorious Unit Commendation	Combat Action Badge		
Valorous Unit Award	Meritorious Unit Commendation	Medal of Honor		Purple Heart Medal
Valorous Unit Award	Meritorious Unit Commendation	Meritorious Service Medal	Army Commendation Medal	Army Achievement Medal w/two Oak Leaf Clusters
Valorous Unit Award	Meritorious Unit Commendation	Army Good Conduct Medal w/2 bronze loops	Marine Corps Good Conduct Medal	National Defense Service Medal
Valorous Unit Award	Meritorious Unit Commendation	Afghanistan Campaign Medal w/2 service stars	Global War on Terrorism Service Medal	NCO Professional Development Ribbon w/award numeral 2
Valorous Unit Award	Meritorious Unit Commendation	Army Service Ribbon	Army Overseas Service Ribbon with bronze award numeral 3	NATO Medal for service with ISAF
Valorous Unit Award	Meritorious Unit Commendation	Air Assault Badge		Expert marksmanship badge with one weapon clasp

=== Medal of Honor citation ===
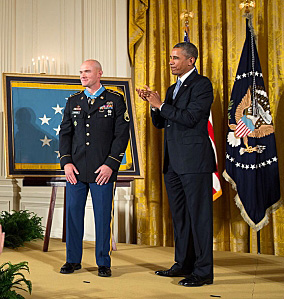
Carter with U.S. President Barack Obama in the East Room of the White House after Carter was presented with the Medal of Honor for conspicuous gallantry.

Specialist Ty M. Carter distinguished himself by acts of gallantry and intrepidity at the risk of his life above and beyond the call of duty while serving as a Scout with Bravo Troop, 3d Squadron, 61st Cavalry Regiment, 4th Brigade Combat Team, 4th Infantry Division, during combat operations against an armed enemy in Kamdesh District, Nuristan Province, Afghanistan on October 3, 2009. On that morning, Specialist Carter and his comrades awakened to an attack of an estimated 300 enemy fighters occupying the high ground on all four sides of Combat Outpost Keating, employing concentrated fire from recoilless rifles, rocket propelled grenades, anti-aircraft machine guns, mortars and small arms fire. Specialist Carter reinforced a forward battle position, ran twice through a 100 meter gauntlet of enemy fire to resupply ammunition and voluntarily remained there to defend the isolated position. Armed with only an M4 carbine rifle, Specialist Carter placed accurate, deadly fire on the enemy, beating back the assault force and preventing the position from being overrun, over the course of several hours. With complete disregard for his own safety and in spite of his own wounds, he ran through a hail of enemy rocket propelled grenade and machine gun fire to rescue a critically wounded comrade who had been pinned down in an exposed position. Specialist Carter rendered life extending first aid and carried the Soldier to cover. On his own initiative, Specialist Carter again maneuvered through enemy fire to check on a fallen Soldier and recovered the squad’s radio, which allowed them to coordinate their evacuation with fellow Soldiers. With teammates providing covering fire, Specialist Carter assisted in moving the wounded Soldier 100 meters through withering enemy fire to the aid station and before returning to the fight. Specialist Carter’s heroic actions and tactical skill were critical to the defense of Combat Outpost Keating, preventing the enemy from capturing the position and saving the lives of his fellow Soldiers. Specialist Ty M. Carter’s extraordinary heroism and selflessness above and beyond the call of duty are in keeping with the highest traditions of military service and reflect great credit upon himself, Bravo Troop, 3d Squadron, 61st Cavalry Regiment, 4th Brigade Combat Team, 4th Infantry Division and the United States Army.

== Personal life ==
Carter was born in Spokane, Washington, on January 25, 1980, to Mark and Paula Carter, and moved to California's Bay Area in 1981. In 1991, his family moved back to Spokane, where he graduated from North Central High School in 1998. He later settled in Antioch, California until he enlisted in the US Marine Corps.

Carter married April Ait in 2004 and divorced in 2008, having one daughter, Madison (born 2004). He later married Shannon Derby in 2009 and divorced in 2015, having one daughter, Sehara (born January 2013). Carter is also the stepfather of Jayden Young, Shannon's son from a previous relationship. Carter dated Jennifer "Jenn" Aedo from 2016 until 2018. Carter and Adeo have one daughter, Eve (born April 2017).

On July 13, 2000, his older brother, Seth Allen Carter (May 11, 1978 – July 13, 2000), was shot in the chest and killed by a drunk person, who was playing with a shotgun during a party in Spokane, Washington.

== In popular culture ==
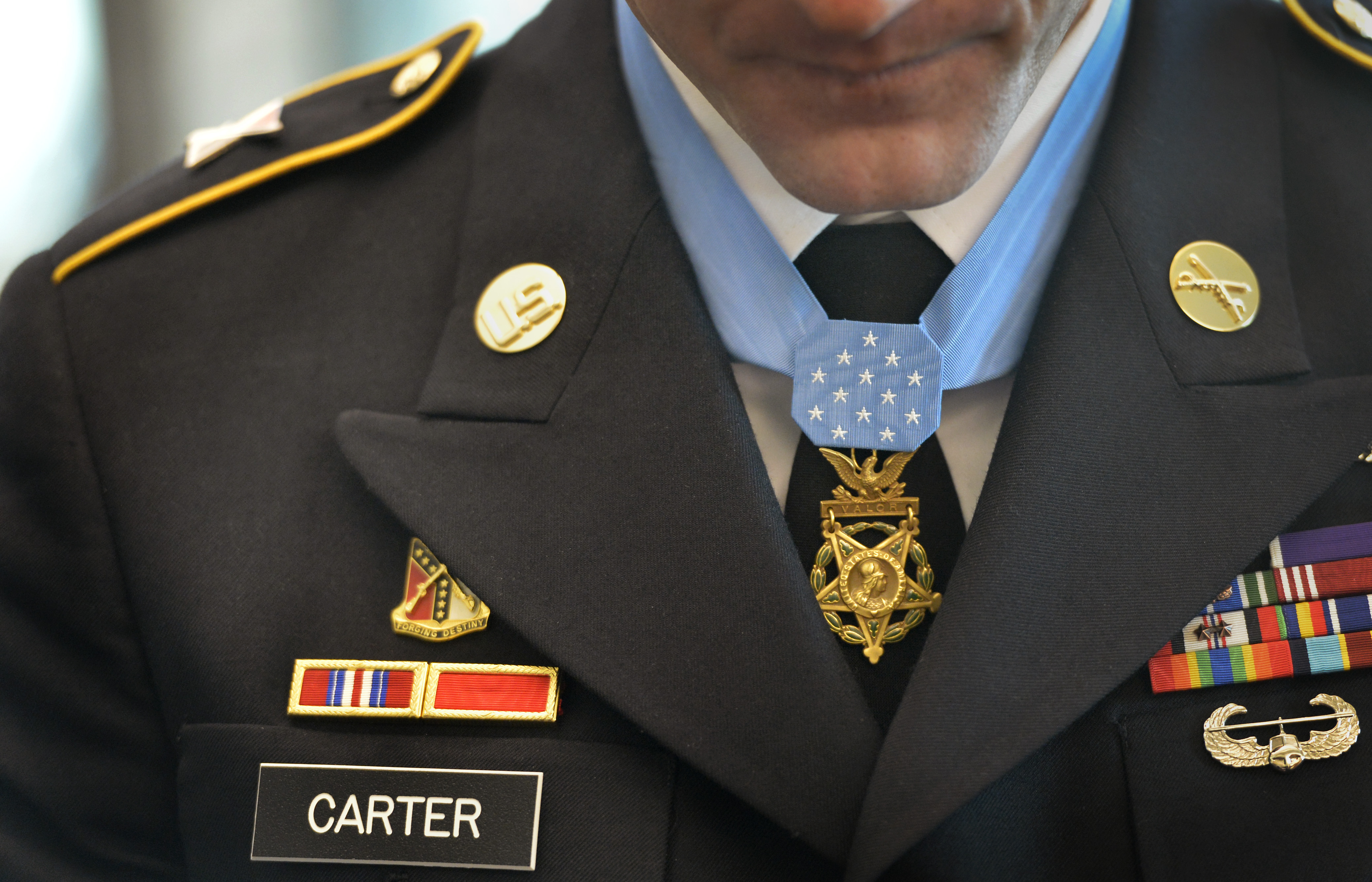
Staff Sgt. Ty Carter wears his medal

The film The Outpost, released on July 3, 2020, and based on the book The Outpost: An Untold Story of American Valor by Jake Tapper, follows the series of events on the US military outpost Combat Outpost Keating in the lead up to the Battle of Kamdesh on October 3, 2009. In the film, Carter is portrayed by Caleb Landry Jones; Scott Eastwood portrays Clinton Romesha.

Carter is featured in Medal of Honor Season 1, Episode 8.

== See also ==
- List of post-Vietnam Medal of Honor recipients
