= Observation Post Fritsche =

Observation Post Fritsche was a small American military base in Nurestan Province, in Afghanistan.

It was originally known as Observation Post Warheit, and was created to provide overwatch to Combat Outpost Keating. It was later dedicated to the memory of Staff Sergeant Ryan Fritsche and renamed as Observation Post Fritsche.

The 1st Squadron 91st Cavalry Regiment was the last unit to call it OP Warheit. Ssgt. Ryan Fritsche was KIA July 27, 2007 during the battle of Saret Koleh along with Maj. Bostick. The OP was named for Ssgt. Fritsche before the unit returned from the 15-month deployment.
