= Cavalry scout =

U.S. Army soldier who has received training as an Armored Reconnaissance Specialist

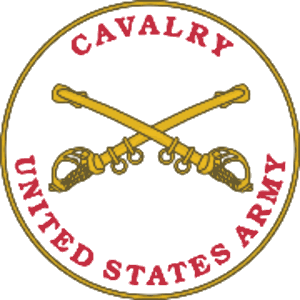
- Cavalry branch plaque
- Active: 17 November 1775 – present
- Country: United States
- Allegiance: United States of America
- Branch: United States Army
- Type: Main Armor Corps Element
- Role: Reconnaissance, security, assault,
- Patron: Saint George

Insignia
- Branch insignia

Cavalry Scout is the job title of someone who has achieved the military occupational specialty of 19D Armored Reconnaissance Specialist in the Combat Arms branch of the United States Army. As with all enlisted soldiers in the United States Cavalry, the person holding the Scout specialization will still be referred to as a "Trooper", the traditional colloquialism denoted in the cavalry's Order of the Spur.

Cavalry Scouts use their special training to obtain, distribute, and share vital combat and battlefield intelligence on the enemy and on combat circumstances and environmental conditions. The Cavalry Scout is also known as the "eyes and ears" of the Army.

== Role ==
The job of a Cavalry Scout is to operate as one of the first personnel in an area.

Cavalry Scouts gather information on the enemy by dismounted and/or mounted reconnaissance patrols. Cavalry Scouts engage the enemy with anti-armor weapons and scout vehicles in the field, track and report enemy movement and activities, and will direct the employment of various weapon systems onto the enemy.

Their specialized skills enable them to assist with observation and listening posts, perform and help with navigation, and help secure and transport ammunition. The Cavalry Scout leads, serves, or assists as a member of a scout crew, squad, section, platoon or troop in reconnaissance, security, and other combat operations.

== Major duties by skill level ==
Skill Level I (E1 Private – E4 Specialist/Corporal)

- Performs duties as crewmember, operates, and performs operator maintenance on scout vehicles: Cavalry Fighting Vehicle (M3 Bradley CFV), HMMWV (Humvee), M1127 reconnaissance vehicle (Stryker), crew-served weapons, anti-armor weapons, and communications equipment.
- Loads, clears, and fires individual and crew-served weapons.
- Engages enemy armor with anti-armor weapons.
- Operates and performs operator maintenance on wheeled vehicles.
- Assists in the recovery of wheeled and tracked vehicles. Secures, prepares, and stows ammunition on scout vehicles.
- Performs mounted and dismounted navigation.
- Serves as member of observation and listening post.
- Gathers and reports information on terrain features and enemy strength, disposition, and equipment.
- Applies principles of escape and evasion.
- Collects data for the classification of routes, fords, tunnels, and bridges.
- Performs dismounted patrols.
- Employs principles of cover and concealment and camouflage.
- Assists with construction of light field fortifications, laying and removal of mines, and emplacing demolitions.
- Requests and adjusts indirect fire.

Skill Level II (E5 Sergeant)

- Supervises scout vehicle crew.
- Supervises operator maintenance of tracked and wheeled scout vehicles and individual and crew-served weapons.
- Selects, organizes, and supervises operation of observation and listening posts.
- Supervises scout vehicle recovery operations.
- Trains scout vehicle crew.
- Supervises request, receipt, storage, and issue of ammunition.
- Leads scout vehicle crew and assists in leading scout squad.
- Serves as gunner, on CFV, HMMWV, and M1127 Stryker RV.
- May also serve as an Operations Assistant at brigade or squadron level.

Skill Level III (E6 Staff Sergeant)

- Supervises scout sections and squads.
- Directs tactical deployment of section and squads in combat.
- Supervises maintenance of assigned vehicles and equipment.
- Collects, reports and evaluates accuracy of intelligence information.
- Directs reconnaissance of fording sites, tunnels, and bridges.
- Directs route / area / zone reconnaissance at section level.
- Coordinates action of vehicles with platoon and supporting elements.
- Evaluates terrain, selected routes, assembly areas, firing positions, and positions for combat operations.
- Identifies, selects targets, and issues fire commands.
- Supervises construction of hasty fortifications.
- Supervises section and squad resupply of class I, III, and V.
- Trains scout section.
- Coordinates requirements for organizational maintenance.
- Conducts scout section drills.
- Calls for, observes, and adjusts indirect fires.
- May also serve as an Operations Assistant in the squadron/battalion or higher level staffs and as Operations NCO at troop level.

Skill Level IV (E7 Sergeant First Class)

- Assists the commander or operations officer in planning, organizing, directing, supervising, training, coordinating, and reporting activities of the scout or armored cavalry platoon and staff sections.
- Directs distribution of fire in combat.
- Supervises platoon maintenance activities.
- Collects, evaluates, and assists in interpretation and dissemination of combat information.
- Directs platoon tactical movement, platoon security operations (screening), and platoon route/area/zone reconnaissance.
- Supervises the employment of OPSEC measures.
- Coordinates the evacuation of casualties.
- Coordinates and conducts platoon resupply.
- Requests and adjusts aerial fires.
- May also serve as an Assistant Operations NCO at battalion or higher level.

== Uniform ==
Cavalry Scouts wear the ACU, or Army Combat Uniform. The standard camouflage pattern issued is the OCP (OEF) Camouflage Pattern, commonly referred to as Multicam. Two unique articles, the stetson hat as well as spurs, can be worn during special events or when directed by the chain of command. Cavalry Scouts are permitted to wear the Cavalry Stetson Hat with the Dress Uniforms during formal unit functions. The Stetson is traditionally accompanied by wearing the spurs which are earned when the unit conducts a "Spur Ride." Cavalry Spurs can be earned by all Cavalry Scouts. Spurs may be worn on bloused combat boots with the dress uniforms and the duty uniform. The generally accepted Cavalry Spurs are the simplified Prince of Wales spurs (spurs without the rowel, or star-shaped 'wheel' on the back).

A Scout is authorized to wear silver spurs if he has completed a Spur Ride, a rigorous series of physical and mental tasks/events designed to test the scout's military skills, military bearing, physical endurance, mental fortitude, teamwork, ability to act under pressure and exhaustion, and ability to think and improvise quickly. The spur ride was similar to the Infantry's Expert Infantryman Badge in that only a scout could earn them. That tradition has since changed from the mid to late 1990s and now anyone serving in a Cavalry unit, CA or CSS can earn them. The Spur Ride rarely lasts more than three days (sometimes as little as one very long day and night), primarily due to U.S. Army regulations against hazing traditions. In short, it once was a "gut" check or a "smoke" session but it has changed with the times but some units still practice some of the older traditions when it comes to earning the spurs. The exact details of a Spur Ride varies according to the traditions of the particular Cavalry Squadron.

A Scout who has previously earned his silver spurs and then serves in combat is eligible for brass or gold combat spurs. Scouts who have directly been involved in combat are often awarded combat spurs in lieu of the normally prerequisite silver spurs. A Cavalry Trooper that has earned both Silver spurs and Gold spurs are known as a Master Spur Holder in the Order of the Spur.

The Certificate awarded to Order of the Spur inductees, while honored by Cavalrymen everywhere, is not a document that is authorized for inclusion in a soldier's permanent official military file. Regardless, induction into the Order of the Spur is for life, and once awarded is recognized no matter which duty station the Cavalry Scout is assigned to.

Although awarding of the Cavalry Spurs is often reserved for Cavalry troopers only, a deserving soldier or foreign military member who has provided great service (often in combat) to the Cavalry Squadron may be awarded Spurs.

The spurs and stetson are not authorized and are not official headgear or award. They are part of the esprit de corps that lives within the Cav.

== Qualifications ==
Physical demands rating and qualifications for initial award of military occupational specialty; the job is available to female personnel. Cavalry scouts must possess the following qualifications:

- Physical Demands Rating = Very Heavy
- Physical profile (The PULHES Factor) = 111121 or better
- Correctable vision of 20/20 in one eye and 20/100 in other eye
- Normal color vision
- A minimum score, of 87 in aptitude area CO (ASVAB/GT score)
- Formal training (completion of military occupational specialty I 19D course conducted under the auspices of the U.S. Army Armor School) mandatory
- Highest rank an individual may be reclassified into military occupational specialty 19D is rank SPC

== Additional skill identifiers ==
- 6B – Reconnaissance and Surveillance Leaders Course
- D3 – Bradley Fighting Vehicle System
- E9 – M901 (ITV) Gunner/Crew Training
- F7 – Pathfinder
- J3 – Bradley Fighting Vehicle Master Gunner
- P5 – Master Fitness Trainer
- 2C – Javelin Gunnery
- 2S – Battle Staff Operations (skill level 3 and above)
- 4A – Reclassification Train
- 2B – Air Assault
- B4 – Sniper*
- R4 – Stryker Armored Vehicle Operator
- R7 – Graduate of ARC (Army Reconnaissance Course) All graduates of the Army Reconnaissance Course that are recommended by the Armor Proponent will be awarded the “Personnel Only” SI/ASI R7 in coordination with the Branch Manager for that CMF.
- 5W – Jumpmaster (personnel only)
- Ranger

*ASI will only be awarded to Soldiers possessing MOS 11B

== Skill qualification identifiers ==
- 3 – Advisor
- P – Parachutist
- Q – Equal Opportunity Adviser
- 8 – Instructor
- X – Drill Sergeant
- V – Airborne Ranger
- G – Ranger
- 4 – Recruiter
- D – SHARP Representative

=== Training and School information ===
All Cavalry Scouts attend OSUT (One Station Unit Training) or split ops training at Fort Benning in Georgia. The first phase, roughly 10 weeks, is basic military training. The second phase, roughly 12 weeks long, focuses on becoming a Scout for a total of 22 weeks. The U.S. Army is currently testing and considering extending training to a 22-week OSUT course. During these final weeks the future Cavalry Scouts are trained by Instructors as well as their Drill Sergeants.

The OSUT training was moved from Fort Knox, Kentucky, to Fort Benning, Georgia, in 2011. Prior to current phase, OSUT was offered in the form of Cavalry Scout training with Ranger Assessment Selection combination to better prepare Soldiers for The Global War on Terror. This program ended in 2008 in favor of unit based Ranger School recommendation.

Training is broken into color-coded phases, during which recruits gain increasing freedom, based on the recommendations of their drill Sergeants. Training requires excellent physical and mental condition, and is mostly hands-on, in the field. Due to rigorous training an incoming recruit group can see a drop by half or more prior to graduation.

== Notable Cavalry Scouts ==
- Ty Carter, Medal of Honor recipient
- Clinton Romesha, Medal of Honor recipient
- Kenneth Preston, 13th Sergeant Major of the Army
- Michael S. Tucker, former Commanding General of the 2nd Infantry Division
- Larry D. Wyche, former Commanding General of Combined Arms Support Command
- John W. Troxell, 3rd Senior Enlisted Advisor to the Chairman of the Joint Chiefs of Staff

== See also ==
- Dismounted reconnaissance troop
- Reconnaissance, surveillance and target acquisition
