= Outpost (military) =

Location where detachments are stationed

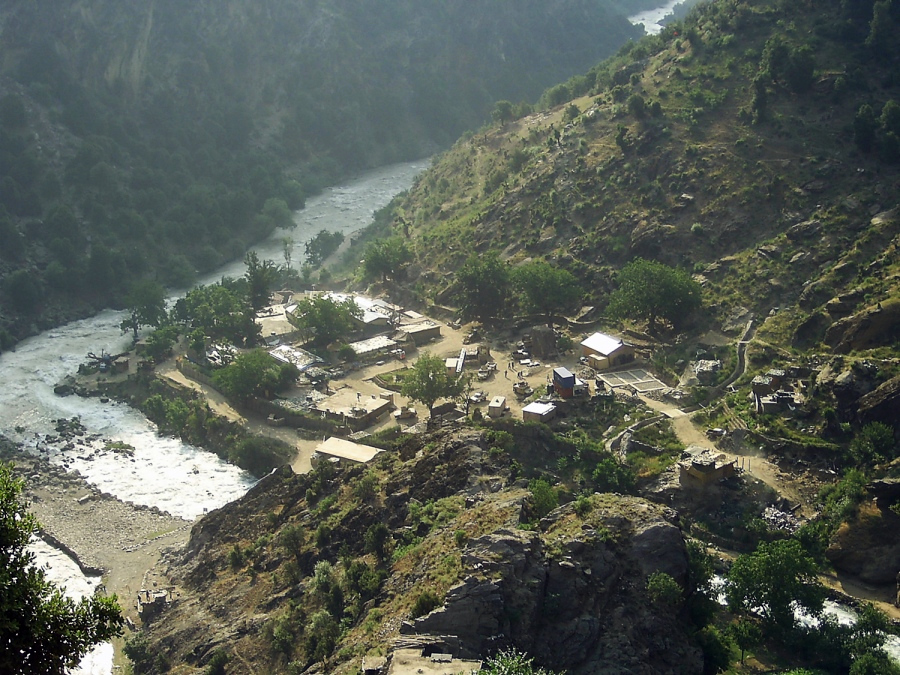
Combat Outpost Keating in Nurestan Province, Afghanistan.

In military terminology, an outpost is a location where detachments of military personnel are stationed at a distance from the main armed force or formation in a region. Outposts are usually located in remote or sparsely populated areas, positioned to observe and defend against unauthorized intrusions and surprise attacks, serving as the first line of defense. The station occupied by such troops, usually a small military base or settlement in an outlying frontier, limit, political boundary or in another country. The Merriam-Webster dictionary posits that the first use of the word occurred in 1720.

Outposts can take many different forms, but share the features of being enclosed or otherwise separated from their environment and being regularly staffed by some sort of protective force. In some cases, these outposts develop satellite communities such as mining towns or frontier settlements in the area that outpost protects.

== Recent military use ==
Military outposts, most recently referred to as combat outposts (COPs), served as a cornerstone of counterinsurgency doctrine in Iraq and Afghanistan. These permanent or semi-permanent structures, often located in or near populated areas, enabled military forces to secure key lines of communication or infrastructure, secure and co-opt the populace, assist the government in restoring essential services, and force insurgents to operate elsewhere. Combat outposts were almost unanimously described in positive terms by defense analysts and military officers as a means through which to carry out its counterinsurgency efforts. Types of outposts are used in almost every war in low supply regions as the can protect supply routes and key points.

== See also ==
- Blockhouse
- Border outpost
- Forward operating base
- Human outpost
- Military base
- Observation post
- Satellite airfield
- Screening (tactic)
