= The Outpost (2019 film) =

2019 American war film

- Theatrical release poster
- Directed by: Rod Lurie
- Screenplay by: Paul Tamasy; Eric Johnson
- Based on: The Outpost: An Untold Story of American Valor by Jake Tapper
- Produced by: Paul Michael Merryman; Paul Tamasy; Marc Frydman; Jeffrey Greenstein; Jonathan Yunger; Les Weldon
- Starring: Scott Eastwood; Caleb Landry Jones; Orlando Bloom; Jack Kesy; Cory Hardrict; Milo Gibson; Jacob Scipio; Taylor John Smith
- Cinematography: Lorenzo Senatore
- Edited by: Michael J. Duthie
- Music by: Larry Groupé
- Production companies: Millennium Media; Perfection Hunter; York Films
- Distributed by: Screen Media Films
- Release dates: November 2, 2019 (Thessaloniki International Film Festival); July 3, 2020 (United States)
- Running time: 123 minutes
- Country: United States
- Language: English
- Budget: $5 million
- Box office: $2.3 million

The Outpost is a 2019 American war film directed by Rod Lurie, based on the 2012 non-fiction book The Outpost: An Untold Story of American Valor by Jake Tapper, about the Battle of Kamdesh in the war in Afghanistan. It stars Scott Eastwood, Caleb Landry Jones, Orlando Bloom, Jack Kesy, Cory Hardrict, Milo Gibson, Jacob Scipio, Will Attenborough, and Taylor John Smith.

It had its world premiere at Thessaloniki International Film Festival on November 2, 2019. The film was scheduled to premiere at the 2020 South by Southwest Film Festival, but the festival was canceled due to the COVID-19 pandemic. It was released via Premium VOD and in selected theaters on July 3, 2020 by Screen Media Films. The film received generally positive reviews from critics, with praise for the battle sequences and respectful depiction of the soldiers.

== Background ==
In 2006, Provincial Reconstruction Team Kamdesh – later renamed Combat Outpost Keating – was one of several U.S. Army outposts established in Northern Afghanistan. Located in a remote valley surrounded by the Hindu Kush mountains, the base was regarded as a deathtrap; the troops stationed there faced regular Taliban attacks, culminating in one of the bloodiest American engagements of Operation Enduring Freedom. The film tells the story of the 53 U.S. soldiers, members of the 4th Infantry Division, and two Latvian military advisors who battled some 300 enemy insurgents at the Battle of Kamdesh.

== Plot ==
In 2006, the U.S. Army established a series of outposts in Northern Afghanistan to promote counterinsurgency. The intent was to connect with the locals and to stop the flow of weapons and Taliban fighters from Pakistan. One of these was PRT Kamdesh. It was built in a remote valley completely surrounded by the Hindu Kush mountains. One analyst said it may as well be called "Camp Custer." His reasoning was simple and official. Everyone at The Outpost was going to die.

— The Outpost, based on a true story

During the war in Afghanistan, Staff Sergeant Romesha and a new group of soldiers arrive at PRT Kamdesh, under the command of Captain Keating. Sergeant Scusa saves a dog from being shot, and the men fend off Taliban attacks. SSG Gallegos assaults Private First Class Yunger for firing too close to his head, while SGT Larson reprimands Specialist Carter for arguing during the firefight. Keating arranges a shura to offer local elders money for infrastructure projects in exchange for peace. A gunshot residue test proves that a local man took part in the previous day's attack, but he and others lay down their arms. Keating offers to drive a large Light Medium Tactical Vehicle through the narrow mountain roads; while Romesha and Carter scout ahead, the vehicle falls off a cliff, killing Keating.

The new commanding officer, CPT Yllescas, sends out a patrol after another attack; Romesha details how he would mount an assault on the vulnerable outpost. SGT Kirk apprehends a local man paid by the elders to take pictures of the base, which leads Yllescas to withhold the money Keating promised them. The base's Afghan interpreter, Mohammed, warns of an impending large-scale attack, but his fears are dismissed. Patrolling a bridge with Yunger, Yllescas is killed by a bomb; the traumatized Yunger is talked out of suicide by Romesha and extracted out of the Outpost with Yllescas' body.

CPT Broward takes charge of the base, which he reveals will soon be closed. An Afghan ID is found near the bridge, presumably belonging to the bomber, but Broward refuses to allow Romesha and the men to search the nearby villages. Romesha clashes with Broward over the captain's strict adherence to the rules of engagement, and pressure from Afghan President Karzai postpones the closing of the base. Carter approaches First Lieutenant Bundermann with the men's concern about Broward's leadership, but is rebuffed.

A nighttime attack reveals the insurgents now have night vision equipment and mortars. The next day, elders arrive with the body of a girl they fraudulently claim was killed by the American counterattack; Broward agrees to compensate them, and shoots Scusa's dog for biting an elder. As the troops blow off steam by waterboarding each other, Broward reveals he has been relieved of command and the base will officially close in October. Left in command, Bundermann orders the men not to send any communication about leaving the base, as the soldiers make calls to their loved ones.

On the morning of October 3, 2009, Mohammed alerts the base that the villagers are gone and hundreds of Taliban fighters have surrounded the outpost. A firefight erupts, sending the Afghan National Army forces fleeing, and PFC Thomson and Scusa are killed. Gallegos and several others are pinned down inside an armored vehicle, and Romesha is wounded trying to reach them. Learning Kirk has been killed, Romesha eliminates a Taliban sniper. SGT Hardt, SPC Griffin, and PVT Faulkner try to reach Gallegos' position, but their vehicle becomes stuck as they realize the Taliban have breached the perimeter. Griffin and Hardt are killed, and Romesha reaches the tactical operations center and convinces Bundermann they should retake the base.

Larson and Carter lay down covering fire, allowing the others to escape from the armored vehicle. Gallegos and SSG Martin are killed, and despite taking heavy gunfire, Carter rescues wounded SPC Mace. Romesha leads a group of men to successfully secure the front gate, just as air support arrives. As a B-1 bomber drops its payload on the Taliban's position, Carter and Larson carry Mace to the aid station, where CPT Cordova uses fresh blood from himself and others to transfuse Mace. CPT Portis and a quick reaction force arrive, dispatching the last of the insurgents. The remaining soldiers leave by helicopter as the base is demolished with explosives, and learn Mace did not survive. The Battle of Kamdesh left 27 Americans wounded and 8 dead, and Romesha and Carter each received the Medal of Honor, members of what became the most decorated unit of the war.

== Cast ==
- Scott Eastwood as Staff Sergeant Clint Romesha
- Caleb Landry Jones as Specialist Ty Michael Carter
- Orlando Bloom as Captain Benjamin D. Keating
- Jack Kesy as Sergeant Josh Kirk
- Cory Hardrict as Staff Sergeant Vernon Martin
- Milo Gibson as Captain Robert Yllescas
- Jacob Scipio as Staff Sergeant Justin T. Gallegos
- Taylor John Smith as 1st Lieutenant Andrew Bundermann
- Jonathan Yunger as Sergeant First Class Jonathan Hill
- Alexander Arnold as Sergeant Chris Griffin
- George Arvidson as Captain Chris Cordova
- Will Attenborough as Private Ed Faulkner
- Chris Born as Specialist Stephan Mace
- Scott Alda Coffey as Sergeant Michael Scusa
- Jack DeVos as Sergeant Josh Hardt
- Sharif Dorani as Mohammed
- Josiah Jack Kalian as Staff Sergeant Shane Courville
- Bobby Lockwood as Private First Class Kevin Thomson
- Kwame Patterson as Captain Sylvanius Broward (based on Mel Porter)
- Alfie Stewart as Private First Class Zorias Yunger (based on U.S. Marine Lieutenant Chris Briley)
- Trey Tucker as Captain Stoney Portis
- Aleksandar Aleksiev as Latvian Army 1st Sergeant Jānis Laķis
- Jeremy Ang Jones as Private First Class Jordan Wong

Three people who served at the actual outpost appear in the movie: Ty Carter appears in a cameo role; Henry Hughes appears in a supporting role as Sergeant Brad Larson, and SPC Daniel Rodriguez appears as himself.

In addition, Adam Baldwin played SPC/SGT Zachary Koppes in an uncredited role and Fahim Fazli played a Taliban fighter in an uncredited role.

== Production ==
After Paul Tamasy acquired the rights to Jake Tapper's book, he and his writing partner, Eric Johnson, sold the project as a pitch to Universal Pictures with Scott Stuber also attached to produce. While negotiating their deal, Sam Raimi expressed interest in directing. After Raimi decided he no longer wanted to direct, Tamasy hired Rod Lurie, West Point graduate-turned-film critic and director. The film was officially announced alongside the casting of Eastwood and Bloom in May 2018, and in August Milo Gibson joined the cast. Trey Tucker was also announced to have joined the cast in November.

Because Clint Romesha had written a book on the conflict that had in-turn been optioned by Sony Pictures, the producers rushed to get The Outpost made, and contact between Romesha and Eastwood (who depicts him in the film) was limited after a legal letter from the studio. Three weeks before filming was set to begin, Eastwood broke his ankle, causing a two-week delay, rewrites, and re-choreographing of the fight sequences. Filming took place mostly in Bulgaria, wrapping in mid-October 2018.

== Release ==
In October 2019, a rough edit of The Outpost was screened for the depicted soldiers and their families in Washington, D.C., which Stoney Portis, who was the commander of the quick reaction force charged with relieving the besieged outpost, called "part of the healing." The film was then scheduled to premiere on March 14, 2020, at the South by Southwest Film Festival. However, the festival was canceled due to the COVID-19 pandemic.

In April 2020, Screen Media Films acquired distribution rights to the film. It was released via Premium VOD and in selected theaters on July 3, 2020. Fathom Events originally planned on releasing the film on 500 screens theatrically from July 2–5, but the plans were scrapped due to the pandemic; it did still release in 69 theaters. It made $14,182 in its debut weekend.

On Veterans Day November 11, 2020, a director's cut a little over 3 minutes longer was released in the theaters. This cut was released to UHD on May 25, 2021.

== Reception ==
=== VOD sales ===
In its debut weekend, The Outpost was the top-rented film on the iTunes Store and FandangoNow, and reportedly was the best debut in Screen Media's history. It remained the number one film on iTunes in its second weekend, as well as on Apple TV, while finishing second at FandangoNow and on Spectrum's weekly chart. The film continued to do well in its third week of release, finishing first at Apple TV and Spectrum and second on FandangoNow. It remained in the top six across all services in the subsequent weeks.

=== Critical response ===
On Rotten Tomatoes, the film has an approval rating of 93% based on 99 reviews, with an average rating of 7.9/10. The site's critics consensus reads: "Told with gripping realism, The Outpost is a thrilling technical feat and a worthy tribute to military heroes." On Metacritic, the film has a weighted average score of 71 out of 100, based on 19 critics, indicating "generally favorable reviews".

Peter Debruge, in his review for Variety, called the film a "harrowing immersive account" of the battle and wrote: "The Outpost isn't glamorous, but it's respectful of the sacrifice and split-second decision-making that Bravo Troop faced, amplifying the terror of such an impossible assignment by attempting to mirror the characters' point of view." David Ehrlich of IndieWire gave the film a "B" and called it "familiar but uncommonly visceral", writing that "Lurie does a strong job of threading the needle between excitement and calamity; shooting much of the 45-minute long ambush in hectic, agile long-takes allows him to capture the Battle of Kamdesh for all of its terror, and with a clarity that allows us to feel that terror in our bones." Writing for The Hollywood Reporter, Frank Scheck said "The Outpost may be a brutal war film, but it's also an obvious labor of love." Johnny Oleksinski of the New York Post praised the film's 40-minute battle scene. Pete Hammond of Deadline similarly praised the battle sequences saying, "I guarantee that for the last hour you might forget to breathe. A must see."

Peter Travers in his review for Rolling Stone awarded the film four out of five stars. He wrote: "There have been other films about the Afghan war, including 12 Strong, War Machine, Lone Survivor, and the superb doc Restrepo. But The Outpost gets it crucially right by bringing home the meaning of heroism as a collective action." Brian Tallerico of RogerEbert.com gave the film three out of four stars, saying, "What elevates Lurie's film is the balance, never allowing his film to turn into blind jingoism, or a castigation of a broken system that sacrifices young men. He keeps his eye where it belongs, on the real people caught in the middle of it all, stuck in the valley of war." Writing for The Washington Post, Ann Hornaday gave the film three and a half out of four stars and said, "Skillfully directed by Rod Lurie, this engrossing and deeply wrenching thriller dances the same fine line as most latter-day movies that want to honor service and sacrifice, without lapsing into empty triumphalism."

The film was praised by veterans, including those who fought in the battle, for its realistic depiction of warfare, everyday soldier life, and the looks of the base.

== See also ==
- Ty Carter
- Clinton Romesha
- Battle of Kamdesh
- Combat Outpost Keating
- List of post-Vietnam War Medal of Honor recipients
- The 9th Company
- Warfare (2025)
