= Kamdesh =

- Town
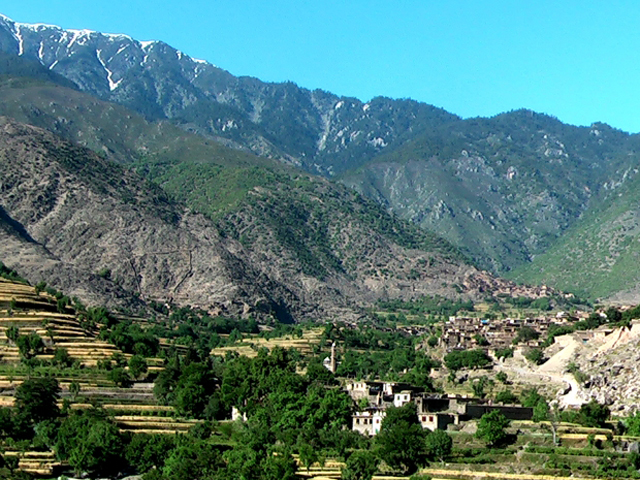
- Kamdesh, Afghanistan

- Location in Afghanistan
- Coordinates: 35°24′37″N 71°20′21″E
- Country: Afghanistan
- Province: Nuristan Province
- Time zone: UTC+4:30

Kāmdēsh (Pashto: کامدېش, Persian: کامدیش), or Kamdeish, is a town in the Landai Sin Valley, and the center of the Kamdesh District in Nuristan Province, Afghanistan. It is located at the general area of Yurmir (يورمير) which is beside the meeting place of two rivers, with one coming from Barg-i Matal, and the second flowing from Nechangal mountains.

Kamdesh is a village within the Landai Sin Valley. It stands as the cultural and administrative hub of the Kamdesh District and all of Eastern Nuristan. Kamdesh literally means "Place of the Kom", as it is the unofficial Capital for the Kom tribe. Within Kamdesh today a visitor can identify each of the original clans identified by Sir George Scott Robertson in the 1890s when he visited the area outlined in his book "The Kafirs of the Hindu Kush." Other than the Nuristanis, there is also other ethnic communities living in Kamdesh such as the Gujars.

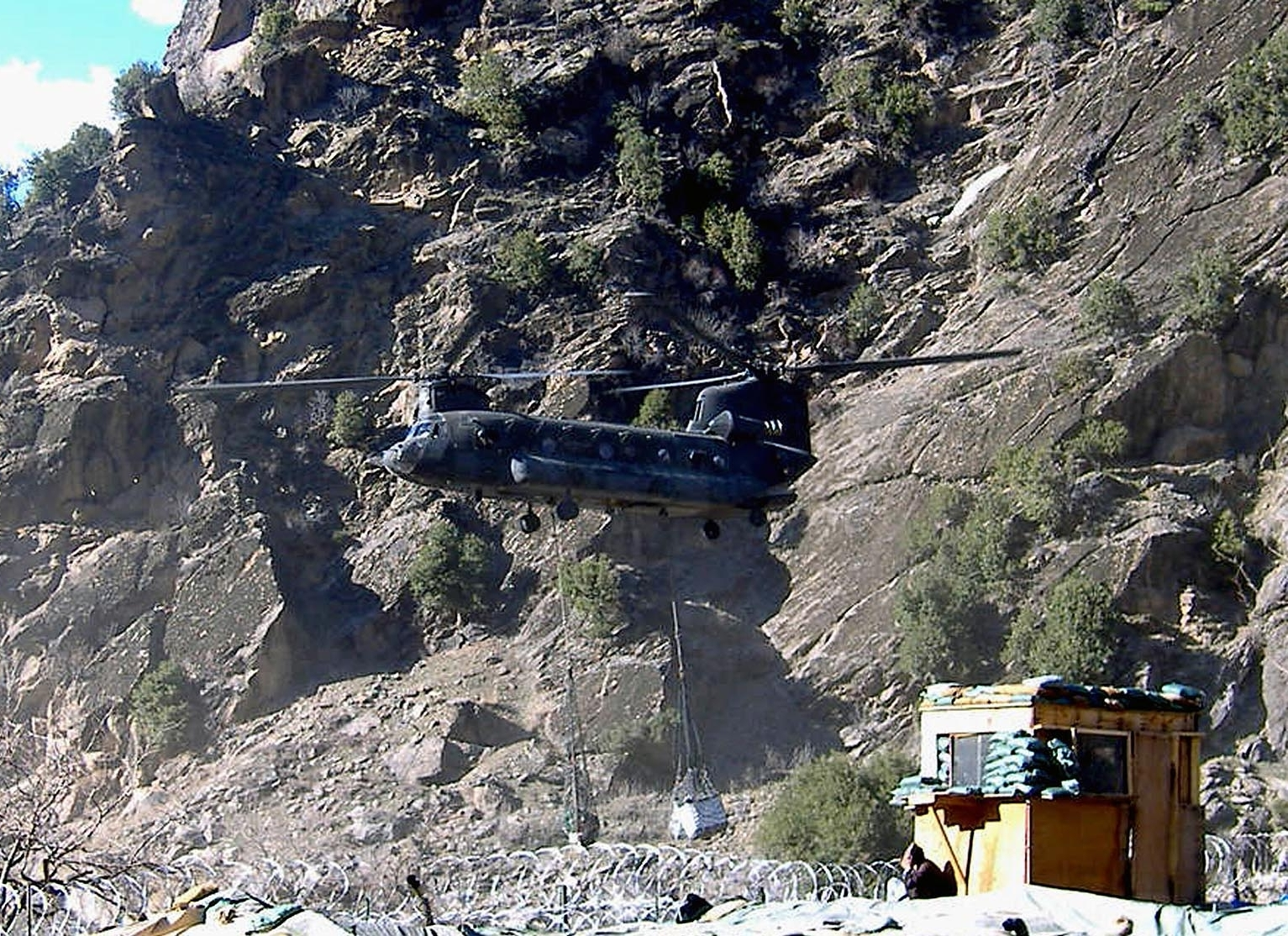
A Chinook helicopter lands at Combat Outpost Keating, in Kamdesh District, Afghanistan, in March 2009

On October 3, 2009, during the War in Afghanistan, the Battle of Kamdesh took place 1 mile (1.6 km) northwest of the village, when a force of 300 Taliban assaulted the American Combat Outpost Keating. The attack resulted in 8 Americans killed and 27 wounded.
