= Landai Sin River =

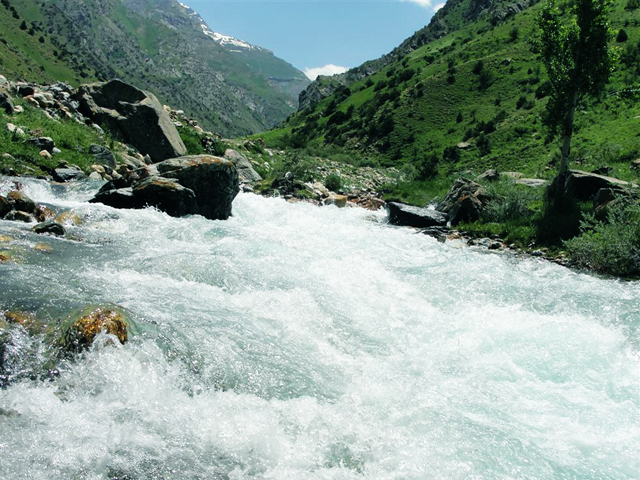

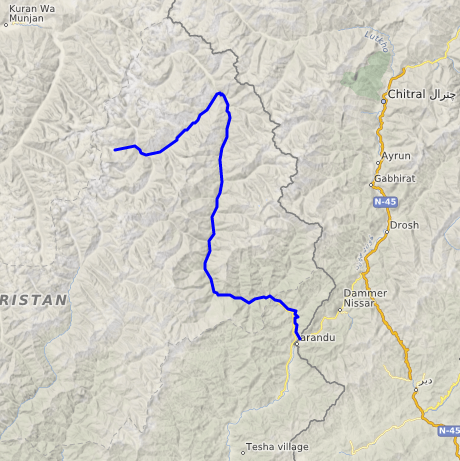

Location
- Country: Afghanistan
- Province: Nuristan

Physical characteristics
- Mouth: Kunar River
  - location: Barikot, Kamdesh, Afghanistan
- Basin size: ~3,000 km^{2} (1,200 sq mi)

Basin features
- River system: Kunar River → Kabul River → Indus River

The Landai Sin River (Pashto: لنډی سين Lanḍai Sīn, "Short River"), also called the Bashgal River (باشګال سيند), is located in eastern Afghanistan. It rises in the Hindu Kush range near the Mandol Pass in the Nuristan Province of Afghanistan, and is fed from glaciers and snow to its north. The Landai Sin is a tributary of Kunar River.

The Landai Sin Valley is inhabited by the Kata, Mumo (Madugal), Kashtan, and Kom tribes of the Nuristani people. Eastern Kata-vari is the main spoken language in the Landai Sin Valley. The main town on the river is Kamdesh.

== See also ==
- List of rivers of Afghanistan
