= Combat Outpost Keating =

American outpost in Nuristan, Afghanistan

Coordinates: 35.4231°N 71.3289°E

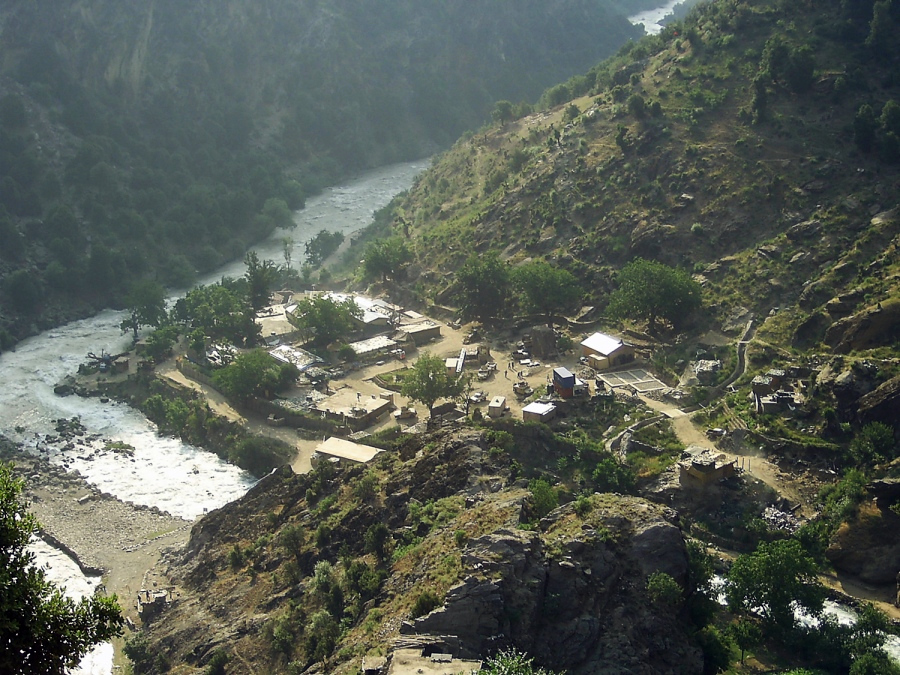
COP Keating was located at the bottom of a valley, conceding the high ground to attackers.

Combat Outpost Keating was a small American military outpost in Nurestan Province, in Afghanistan. It was originally constructed to be a Provincial Reconstruction Team, called PRT Kamdesh, but due to extremely high levels of fighting in the area it remained a fire base instead of a PRT. In December 2006, it was renamed Camp Keating after the death of ABLE Troop 3-71 Cavalry 10th Mountain Division's executive officer, Benjamin Keating, who died November 26, 2006, when his vehicle overturned in Kamdesh, Afghanistan.

Plans were drawn up in the summer of 2006 by the US Army's 10th Mountain Division as part of Operation Mountain Lion.

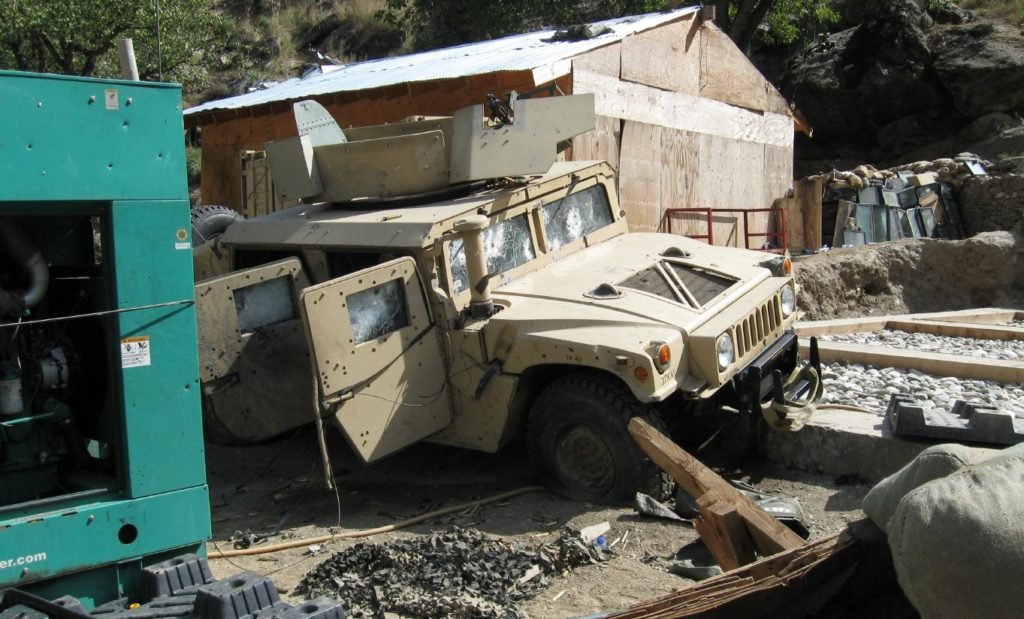
View of a pockmarked armored Humvee at COP Keating, severely damaged during the Battle of Kamdesh.

Combat Outpost Keating is best known as the site of the Battle of Kamdesh, which occurred on October 3, 2009; the base was nearly overrun, and eight Americans and four Afghan defenders were killed. Two Americans, Staff Sergeant Clinton Romesha and Specialist Ty Carter were awarded the Medal of Honor for their actions in defending the base.

The American soldiers killed in the battle were:

- SSG Justin T. Gallegos (Tucson, Arizona), aged 27
- SGT Christopher Griffin (Kincheloe, Michigan), aged 24
- PFC Kevin C. Thomson (Reno, Nevada), aged 21
- SGT Michael P. Scusa (Villas, New Jersey), aged 22
- SSG Vernon W. Martin (Savannah, Georgia), aged 25
- SPC Stephan L. Mace (Lovettsville, Virginia), aged 21
- SGT Joshua J. Kirk (South Portland, Maine), aged 30
- SGT Joshua M. Hardt (Applegate, California), aged 24

The base was abandoned and bombed by an American B-1 bomber on the night of October 6. A day after, on October 7, Taliban fighters were seen among the ruins of the outpost. According to army records, the Taliban commander of the attack on Keating, Abdul Rahman Mustaghni, was killed by the following drone strike, along with thirteen other insurgents.

Amy Davidson Sorkin, writing in The New Yorker, tried to answer the question why the base had not been moved when it was found to be unsuitable. She noted two claims the military put forward in its report: first, the resources to relocate the base had not been available because the brigade was concentrating on guarding a village that Hamid Karzai, president of Afghanistan, considered strategically important. Second, the search for Bowe Bergdahl, in June 2009, had used up so many resources none were available to address the base's unsuitable location.

== In media ==
In May 2016 CBS News profiled Staff Sergeant Romesha, after he published an account of his experiences at the base, entitled Red Platoon: A True Story of American Valor. Romesha was critical of the choice of site for the base, describing it as "like being in a fishbowl or fighting from the bottom of a paper cup."

On November 9, 2018, the Netflix series Medal of Honor featured two separate episodes for both Romesha and Carter's personal accounts of the events that took place at COP Keating during the Battle of Kamdesh.

The films The Outpost and Red Platoon are based on the events that occurred in the Battle of Kamdesh. The former is based on the book The Outpost: An Untold Story of American Valor by journalist Jake Tapper.

== See also ==
- List of post-Vietnam War Medal of Honor recipients
