= Medal of Honor (TV series) =

Television documentary series

- Release poster
- Genre: Documentary; War
- Directed by: James Moll; James Madigan; Robert Legato; Darrin Prescott; Gregg Smrz
- Starring: Joseph Cross; Ben Schwartz; Aldis Hodge; Jonny Weston; Oliver Hudson; Derek Mio; Paul Wesley; Steven R. McQueen
- Composer: Jasha Klebe
- Country of origin: United States
- Original language: English
- No. of seasons: 1
- No. of episodes: 8

Production
- Executive producers: Adam Del Deo; Benjamin Cotner; Lisa Nishimura; Robert Zemeckis; Jack Rapke; Jacqueline Levine; James Moll; Brandon Birtell
- Producers: Christopher Pavlick; Ailee O'Neill
- Running time: 46–61 minutes
- Production companies: Allentown Productions; Compari Entertainment

Original release
- Network: Netflix
- Release: November 9, 2018

Medal of Honor is an anthology documentary series that is based on real life combat events and personal sacrifice that ultimately lead to being awarded the Medal of Honor. The series highlights Medal of Honor awards that are given both posthumously in addition to awards given to recipients who are still alive today. Each episode recreates one person's experience pertaining to the story behind their Medal of Honor award.

== Plot ==
The anthology series combines archival footage, dramatic recreations and interviews with family members, historians, news reporters and fellow veterans to tell each person's unique experience that led to the bestowment of the Medal of Honor, America's highest and most prestigious military decoration.

== Season 1 ==
Medal of Honor recipients highlighted.

- Episode 1: Sylvester Antolak (World War II), Army, portrayed by Joseph Cross
- Episode 2: Clinton Romesha (War in Afghanistan), Army, portrayed by Paul Wesley
- Episode 3: Edward A. Carter Jr. (World War II), Army, portrayed by Aldis Hodge
- Episode 4: Hiroshi H. Miyamura (Korean War), Army portrayed by Derek Mio
- Episode 5: Vito R. Bertoldo (World War II), Army, portrayed by Ben Schwartz
- Episode 6: Joseph Vittori (Korean War), Marine Corps, portrayed by Steven R. McQueen
- Episode 7: Richard Etchberger (Vietnam War), Air Force, portrayed by Oliver Hudson
- Episode 8: Ty Carter (War in Afghanistan), Army, portrayed by Jonny Weston

== Development and production ==
The series is produced by Allentown Productions and Compari Entertainment, and is distributed by Netflix.

== Reception ==
Eddie Strait at DailyDot.com stated’ "It's an ode to service, but more than that, it's a testament to empathy. The show finds a way to honor its subjects without becoming self-congratulatory."
