= Kamdesh District =

Kamdesh
- District
- Location within Afghanistan
- Coordinates: 35°29′00″N 71°19′00″E
- Country: Afghanistan
- Province: Nuristan Province

Population (2010)
  - Total: 24,500

Kamdesh District (Kamdeish District, Pashto: کامدېش ولسوالۍ, Persian: ولسوالی کامدیش) is a district of Nuristan Province in eastern Afghanistan, sharing a name with the town of Kamdesh. It was originally in Kunar Province and then was moved to the newly created Nuristan Province in 2001.

== Boundaries ==
Since March 2004, Kamdesh District borders on:

- Bargi Matal District to the north,
- Pakistan to the east,
- Ghaziabad District and Nari District of Kunar Province to the south,
- Waygal District to the southwest, and
- Parun District to the west.

== See also ==
- Battle of Kamdesh, 2009
- Kom people
