= 61st Cavalry Regiment (United States) =

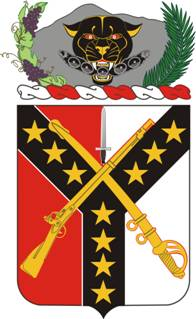
- Coat of arms
- Active: 1941–1945, 2004–2024
- Country: United States
- Type: Armor
- Motto: "Forging Destiny"

Commanders
- 3-61 Commander: LTC Daniel Bell
- 3-61 Squadron CSM: CSM Joshua Ross

Insignia
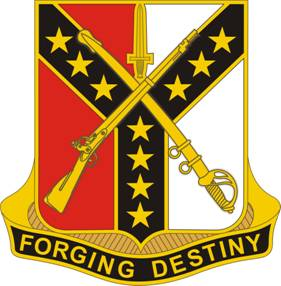
- Distinctive unit insignia

The 61st Cavalry Regiment was a regiment of the United States Army first established in 2004. All four squadrons are inactive, with the 3rd Squadron being inactivated on 15 July 2024.

== History ==
The 61st Cavalry traces its lineage to the 601st Tank Destroyer Battalion. The 601st was activated on the 19th August 1941 and deployed to England on 2 August 1942. In North Africa, the battalion participated in the battles of Ousseltia Valley, Sbeitla, Kasserine Pass, Mateur, and El Guettar, for which it was awarded the Presidential Unit Citation for destroying 37 tanks in 24 hours.

The battalion conducted its first amphibious assault at Salerno on 9 September 1943, with the 36th Infantry Division and 1st Ranger Battalion. It fought through Salerno until 30 September 1943. The 601st conducted its second amphibious assault at Anzio Beachhead where they destroyed 42 enemy tanks and countless enemy personnel.

In Southern France, SSG Clyde Choate of C Company, 601st Tank Destroyer Battalion was awarded the Medal of Honor for his actions near the town of Bruyéres, France, on 25 October 1944. During the 16-day battle at Colmar, the battalion succeeded in destroying 18 enemy tanks and dozens of enemy fortifications. The 601st was awarded its second Presidential Unit Citation for the battalion's actions and valor. In intense fighting outside of Colmar, Second Lieutenant Audie Murphy earned the Medal of Honor by single-handedly defeating a German attack atop a damaged and burning 601st M10 tank destroyer.

During the latter days of the German campaign, the 601st Reconnaissance Company ranged far ahead of the advancing US forces. It helped keep the disorganized remnants of the German army within the allied zone of advance from consolidating and re-organizing. The 601st earned 10 campaign streamers in WW II and 2 Presidential Unit Citations. After brief occupation duties in Europe, the 601st Tank Destroyer Battalion was deactivated.

On 16 August 2004, 1st Squadron 61st, Cavalry Regiment was activated as part of the 4th BCT, 101st Airborne Division at Fort Campbell, Kentucky. The activation was part of the Army's transformation towards a modular force.

In November 2005, the 3rd Squadron 61st Cavalry Regiment deployed to Operation Iraqi Freedom. The squadron was assigned an area of responsibility in southeast Baghdad that consisted of over 1,500 square kilometers and over 1 million people. The AO included the restive towns of Jisr Diyala and Salman Pak, as well as several areas where the enemy had been quite active since 2003.

The squadron conducted over 1,000 combat patrols and executed numerous raids and search and attack operations. Soldiers of the 3rd Squadron 61st Cavalry found and cleared over 200 improvised explosive devices as well as numerous caches.

The squadron detained over 200 insurgents including over 20 division-level high-value targets, earning the unit the Army's Valorous Unit Award. The soldiers of the squadron also permanently removed many insurgents from the fight.

The squadron had the highest number of detainees sentenced to long-term incarceration and the highest number of high-value individuals killed or captured for a battalion-sized unit for all of Multi-National Division - Baghdad.

Beginning in 2007, there were no more RSTA battalions in the US Army, only cavalry units. So, the 3-61 CAV included C Company in 2004–07, which was changed to C Troop (dismounted cavalry) in 2007; A Troop and B Troop remained mounted cavalry.

On 15 July 2024, the 3rd Squadron cased its colors and was officially deactivated.

== Lineage ==
- Formed as 1st Infantry Division Provisional Antitank Battalion – 1941
- Redesignated 601st Tank Destroyer Battalion – 15 December 1941.
- Inactivated as 601st Tank Destroyer Battalion – 18 October 1945.
- Reformed in Army Reserve designated 332nd Heavy Tank Battalion – 1949.
- Redesignated Army Reserve 601st Tank Battalion.
- Activated to Regular Army designated 61st Cavalry Regiment – 2004.

== Distinctive Unit Insignia ==
=== Description ===
A Gold color metal and enamel device 1 1/8 inches (2.9 cm) in diameter overall blazoned as follows: Per pale Gules and Argent, a pall Sable charged with ten mullets Or, three, three and four in pale at base, overall a rifle and a saber grips to base, saltirewise of the like and in chief a dagger point up of the last. Attached below the shield is a Black scroll inscribed "FORGING DESTINY" in Gold.

=== Symbolism ===
The black pall represents the unit's military lineage to the 601st Tank Destroyer Battalion and the Regiment's determination, strength and support to accomplish the unit's military operations. The ten stars suggest the campaign participation during World War II. Red and white are the colors used for the Cavalry's guidon. The crossed rifle and saber suggest the combined arms and the lineage of the major elements used to create the 61st Cavalry Regiment. The dagger symbolizes the unit's military readiness, the early warriors and the dismounted reconnaissance troop.

=== Background ===
The distinctive unit insignia was approved on 14 December 2005.

== Coat Of Arms ==
=== Blazon ===
- Shield – Per pale Gules and Argent, a pall Sable charged with ten mullets Or, three, three and four at base, overall a rifle and saber saltirewise of the like grips to base, the rifle muzzle and the saber handgrip, pommel and part of the blade edged Gules, in chief a dagger point up Proper.
- Crest – From a wreath Argent and Gules, between a wreath consisting of a grapevine fructed in dexter and a palm frond in sinister Proper, a stylized mountain range Argent (Silver Gray) surmounted by a panther head affronté Sable garnished Or, eyed of the first and second, crushing in its mouth a tank of the third garnished of the fourth.
- Motto FORGING DESTINY.

=== Symbolism ===
- Shield – Red and gold are the colors traditionally used by Cavalry units. The black pall represents the unit's military lineage to the 601st Tank Destroyer Battalion and the Regiment's determination, strength and support to accomplish the unit's military operations. The ten stars suggest the campaign participation during World War II. Red and white are the colors used for the Cavalry's guidon. The crossed rifle and saber suggest the combined arms and the lineage of the major elements used to create the 61st Cavalry Regiment. The dagger symbolizes the unit's military readiness, the early warriors and the dismounted reconnaissance troop.
- Crest – The wreath, consisting of a grapevine and palm branch refers to the citation awarded the unit for campaigns in Colmar and Tunisia. The stylized mountain signifies the strength and steadfastness of the Regiment. The panther crushing the tank, adapted from the Tank Destroyer shoulder sleeve insignia, recalls the unit's history.

=== Background ===
The coat of arms was approved on 14 December 2005

== Current configuration ==
- 1st Squadron, 61st Cavalry Regiment (inactive)
- 2nd Squadron, 61st Cavalry Regiment (inactive)
- 3rd Squadron, 61st Cavalry Regiment, 2nd Stryker Brigade Combat Team, 4th Infantry Division (inactive)
- 4th Squadron, 61st Cavalry Regiment (inactive)

== See also ==
- United States Army branch insignia
- List of armored and cavalry regiments of the United States Army
