= Earl Plumlee =

United States Army Master Sergeant and Medal of Honor recipient

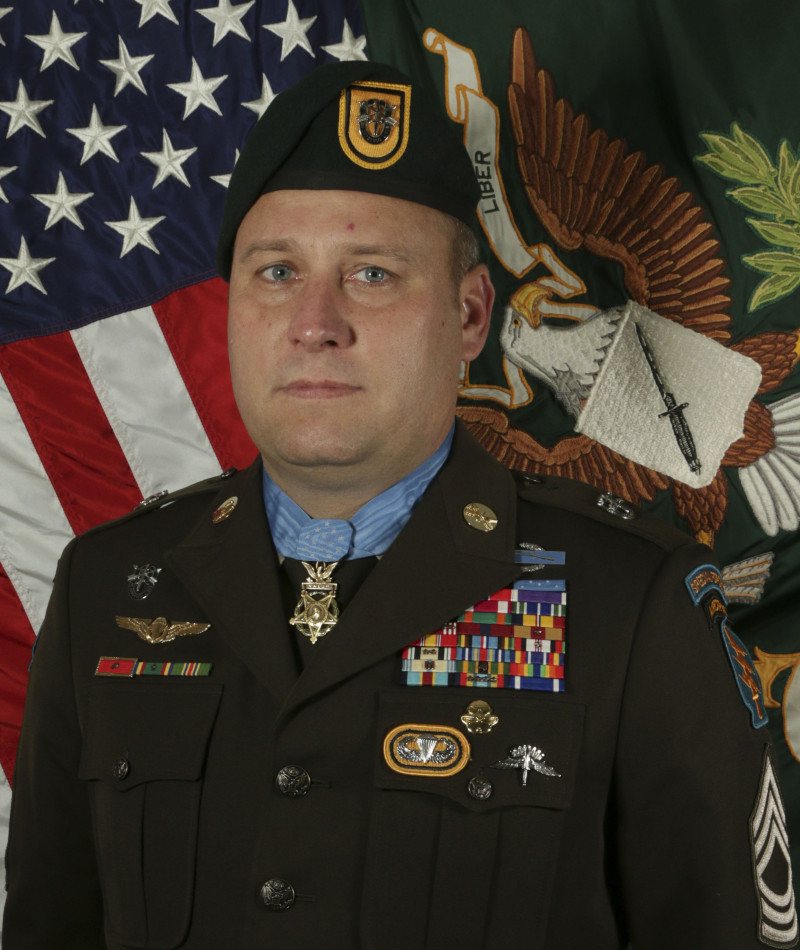
- Born: April 6, 1980 (age 46); Clinton, Oklahoma, U.S.
- Spouse: Terrie Vo (m. 2007)
- Military career
- Allegiance: United States
- Branch: United States Marine Corps; United States Army
- Service years: 1998–2000 (ARNG); 2000–2008 (USMC); 2009–2023 (USA)
- Rank: Master Sergeant
- Unit: 1st Special Forces Group
- Conflicts: Iraq War; War in Afghanistan
- Awards: Medal of Honor; Bronze Star Medal; Purple Heart

Earl D. Plumlee (born April 6, 1980) is a retired master sergeant in the United States Army. He was presented the Medal of Honor for his actions in Afghanistan that took place on 28 August 2013 and presented to him by President Joe Biden on December 16, 2021; awarded the same day, posthumously, were Alwyn Cashe and Christopher Celiz.

== Medal of Honor action ==
On August 28, 2013, Plumlee served as a weapons sergeant assigned to Charlie Company, 4th Battalion, 1st Special Forces Group (Airborne), at Forward Operating Base Ghazni, when the complex was attacked. Plumlee instantly responded to a massive explosion that caused a 60-foot breach in the base's perimeter wall. Ten insurgents wearing Afghan National Army uniforms and suicide vests poured through the breach.

Plumlee and five other special operations soldiers, including Sgt. 1st Class Andrew Busic and Chief Warrant Officer 3 Mark Colbert, intent on defending the base, mounted two vehicles and raced toward the detonation site. Plumlee's driver purposefully maneuvered the vehicle into enemy fire to shield three dismounted teammates, two of whom were injured, placing the vehicle under effective enemy fire from the front and right side.

Using his body to shield the driver from enemy fire, Plumlee exited the vehicle while simultaneously drawing his pistol and engaging an insurgent 15 meters to the vehicle's right. Without cover and with complete disregard for his safety, he advanced toward the enemy force, engaging multiple insurgents with only his pistol. Upon reaching cover, he killed two insurgents.

Plumlee left cover and continued to advance alone. Moving forward, he engaged several combatants at close range. Under intense enemy fire, Plumlee temporarily withdrew to cover, where he joined another soldier.

Plumlee, despite being wounded by a detonating suicide vest, quickly regained his bearings and reengaged the enemy. Intense enemy fire once again forced the two soldiers to temporarily withdraw. Undeterred and resolute, Plumlee joined a small group of American and coalition soldiers moving from cover to counterattack the infiltrators. As the coalition forces advanced, Plumlee engaged an insurgent to his front-left.

Plumlee then ran to mortally wounded Staff Sgt. Michael Ollis (who died while shielding Polish Army Lieutenant Karol Cierpica), carried him to safety, and rendered first aid. Afterwards, he organized three coalition members in a defensive stance as he methodically cleared the area, remained in a security posture and continued to scan for any remaining threats.

== Awards and decorations ==
=== Medal of Honor ===
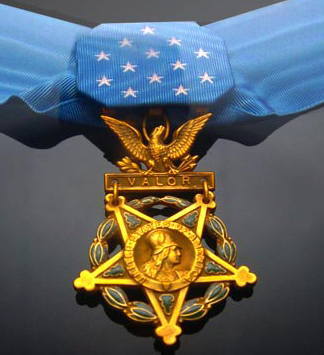

Earl D. Plumlee
Rank and organization: Staff Sergeant, U.S. Army, Operation Detachment Alpha 1434 (ODA-1434), 4th Battalion, 1st Special Forces Group (Airborne)
Place and date: Forward Operating Base Ghazni — Ghazni Province, Afghanistan, 28 August 2013
Awarded for actions during: Global War on Terror

Citation:

The President of the United States of America, authorized by Act of Congress, March 3, 1863, has awarded in the name of Congress the Medal of Honor to Staff Sergeant Earl D. Plumlee, United States Army, for conspicuous gallantry at the risk of his life and above and beyond the call of duty. Staff Sergeant Earl D. Plumlee distinguished himself by acts of gallantry above and beyond the call of duty on August 28, 2013, while serving as a weapons sergeant, C company, 4th Battalion, 1st Special Forces Group (Airborne) in support of Enduring Freedom. Sergeant Plumlee instantly responded to an enemy attack on Forward Operating Base Ghazni — Ghazni Province, Afghanistan — that began with an explosion that tore a 60-foot breach in the base's perimeter wall. Ten insurgents wearing Afghan National Army uniforms and suicide vests poured through the breach. Sergeant Plumlee and five others mounted two vehicles and raced toward the explosion. When his vehicle was engaged by enemy fire, Sergeant Plumlee reacted instinctively, using his body to shield the driver prior to exiting the vehicle and engaging an enemy insurgent 15 meters to the vehicle's right with his pistol. Without cover and in complete disregard for his own safety, he advanced on the enemy, engaging multiple insurgents with only his pistol. Upon reaching cover, he killed two insurgents — one with a grenade and the other by detonating the insurgent's suicide vest using precision sniper fire. Again, disregarding his own safety, Sergeant Plumlee advanced alone against the enemy, engaging several insurgents at close range, including one whose suicide vest exploded a mere seven meters from his position. Under intense enemy fire, Sergeant Plumlee temporarily withdrew to cover, where he joined up with another soldier and, together, they mounted another counterattack. Under fierce enemy fire, Sergeant Plumlee again moved from cover and attacked the enemy forces, advancing within seven meters of a previously wounded insurgent who detonated his suicide vest, blowing Sergeant Plumlee back against a nearby wall. Sergeant Plumlee, ignoring his injuries, quickly regained his faculties and reengaged the enemy forces. Intense enemy fire once again forced the two soldiers to temporarily withdraw. Undeterred, Sergeant Plumlee joined a small group of American and Polish soldiers, who moved from cover to once again counterattack the infiltrators. As the force advanced, Sergeant Plumlee engaged an insurgent to his front left. He then swung around and engaged another insurgent who charged the group from the rear. The insurgent detonated his suicide vest, mortally wounding a U.S. soldier. Sergeant Plumlee, again, with complete disregard for his own safety, ran to the wounded soldier, carried him to safety, and rendered first aid. He then methodically cleared the area, remained in a security posture, and continued to scan for any remaining threats. Staff Sergeant Earl D. Plumlee's extraordinary heroism and devotion to duty are in keeping with the finest traditions of military service and reflect great credit upon himself, the Special Forces Regiment, and the United States Army.
Signed
Joseph R. Biden
the President of the United States.

=== Silver Star ===
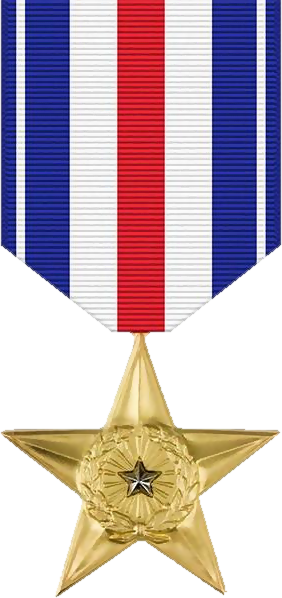

Earl D. Plumlee
Rank and organization: Sergeant First Class, U.S. Army, Operation Detachment Alpha 1434 (ODA-1434), 4th Battalion, 1st Special Forces Group (Airborne)
Place and date: Afghanistan, 28 August 2013
Awarded for actions during: Global War on Terror

Citation:

The President of the United States of America, authorized by Act of Congress July 9, 1918 (amended by an act of July 25, 1963), takes pleasure in presenting the Silver Star to Sergeant First Class Earl D. Plumlee, United States Army, for gallantry in action in August 2013, while serving with Operation Detachment Alpha 1434 (ODA-1434), 1st Special Forces Group (Airborne), in support of Operation ENDURING FREEDOM in Afghanistan. Sergeant First Class Plumlee distinguished himself when a vehicle-borne IED initiated an attack on Forward Operating Base Ghazni, Afghanistan, followed by the attack of nine insurgents armed with small arms, grenades, rocket-propelled grenades and suicide vests. During the attack, Sergeant First Class Plumlee repeatedly engaged the enemy at close range, was wounded by a detonating suicide vest, risked his life to bring another Soldier to safety and provide first aid, all while continually putting himself in the line of fire in order to prevent the assault from penetrating the perimeter of the FOB. His gallant actions and dedicated devotion to duty, without regard for his own life, were in keeping with the highest traditions of military service and reflect great credit upon himself, his unit, and the United States Army.

=== Commendations ===
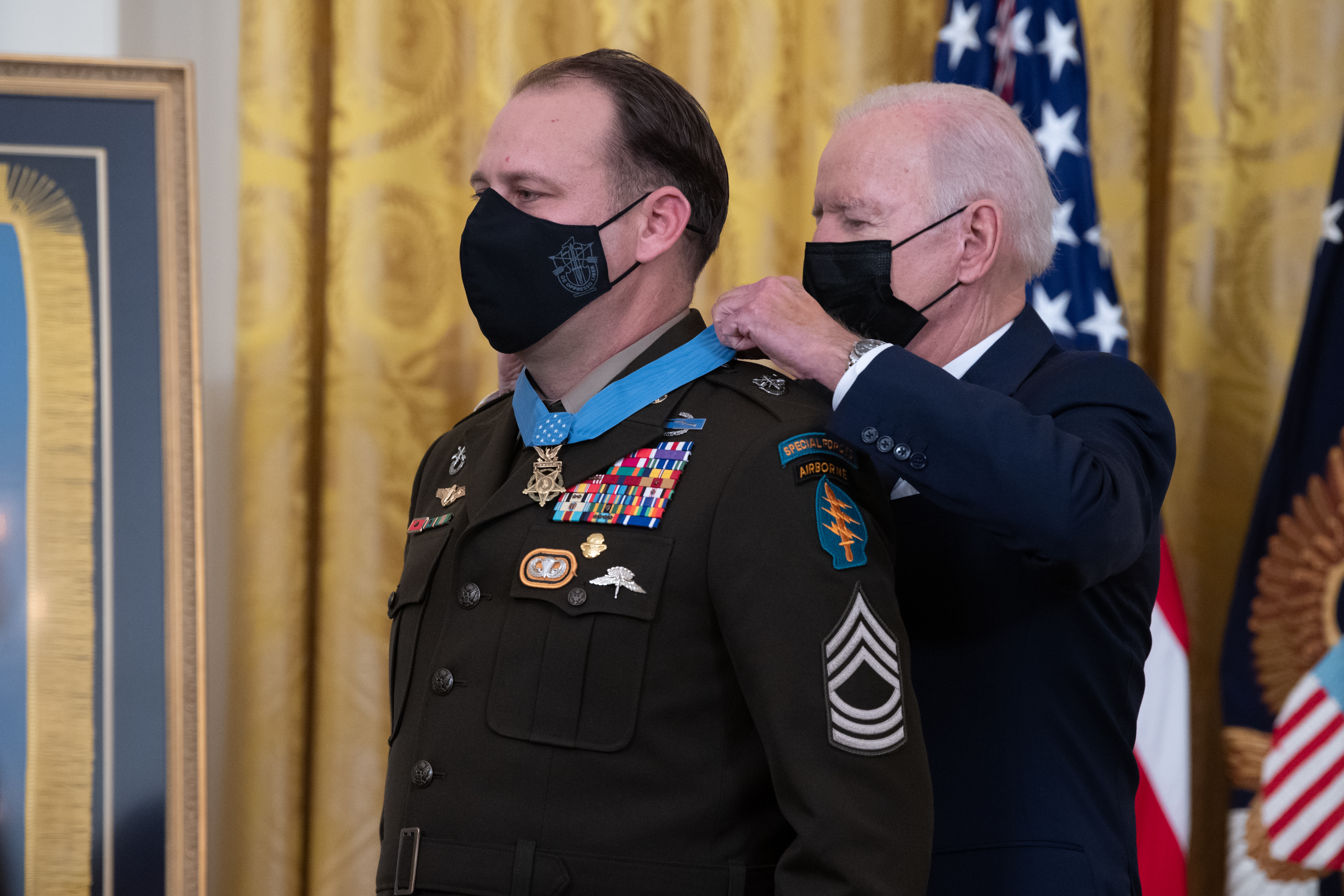
Plumlee is presented with the Medal of Honor by President Joe Biden in a ceremony in the East Room of the White House on December 16, 2021.

U.S. military decorations
Medal of Honor (Upgraded from the Silver Star)
Bronze Star
Purple Heart
Meritorious Service Medal
Army Achievement Medal
Navy and Marine Corps Achievement Medal with 1 5/16-inch star
Combat Action Ribbon
Army Good Conduct Medal (5 awards)
Marine Corps Good Conduct Medal
U.S. Unit Awards
Meritorious Unit Commendation with 1 bronze Oak leaf cluster
Navy Unit Commendation with 1 bronze Service star
Navy Meritorious Unit Commendation
U.S. Service (Campaign) Medals and Service and Training Ribbons
Marine Corps Expeditionary Medal with 1 Service star
National Defense Service Medal
Armed Forces Expeditionary Medal
Afghanistan Campaign Medal with 1 bronze Campaign star
Iraq Campaign Medal with 2 bronze Campaign stars
Global War on Terrorism Expeditionary Medal
Global War on Terrorism Service Medal
Armed Forces Reserve Medal with "M" device
NCO Professional Development Ribbon with bronze award numeral 4
Army Service Ribbon
Army Overseas Service Ribbon
Navy and Marine Corps Sea Service Deployment Ribbon with 4 Campaign stars
NATO Medal for ex-Yugoslavia

Other accoutrements
Combat Infantryman Badge
Expert Infantryman Badge
Basic Parachutist Badge with 1st Special Forces Group background trimming
Military Freefall Parachutist Badge
Marine Corps Combatant Diver Insignia
Honduran Parachutist Badge
Special Forces Tab
1st Special Forces Command Combat Service Identification Badge
United States Army Special Forces Distinctive Unit Insignia
5 Overseas Service Bars
7 Service stripes

== Later life ==
In October 2024, Plumlee joined 15 other Medal of Honor recipients in publicly endorsing Donald Trump for president.

== See also ==
- List of post-Vietnam Medal of Honor recipients
