= Najder =

Najder is a surname. Notable people with the surname include:

- Halina Najder (1926–2017), Polish-British translator
- Jacek Najder (born 1960), Polish diplomat and politician
- Zdzisław Najder (1930–2021), Polish literary historian, critic, and political activist

== See also ==
- Noaidi
