= Janina Pohl-Mizerska =

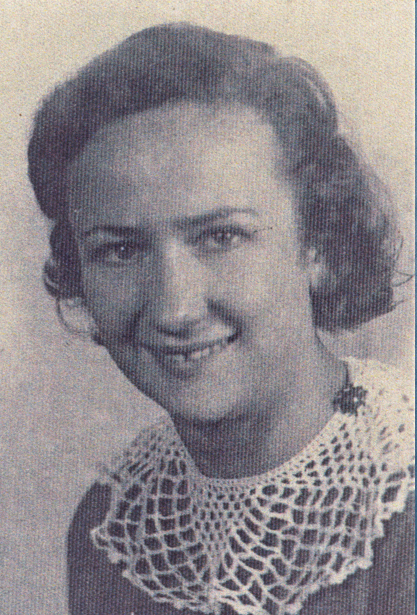
- Born: 5 August 1909; Poznań, Greater Poland Voivodeship, Poland
- Died: 3 January 1999 (aged 89); Olsztynek, Poland
- Known for: cryptography
- Awards: Order of Polonia Restituta; Partisan Cross; Warsaw Uprising Cross

Janina Pohl-Mizerska (5 August 1909 – 3 November 1999) was a Polish cryptographer, nurse, medic in the Warsaw Uprising.

== Life and career ==
Janina, née Pohl, was born on August 5, 1909, in Poznan. Here she graduated from the Sacred Heart of Jesus Gymnasium, and then from the Higher School of Nurses and Hygienists of the Poznański Czerwony Krzyż (Poznan's Red Cross). After being appointed as a certified nurse, she worked at on orthopedic hospital in Swarzędz near Poznan, and in 1933 was drafted into the army and sent to work in military district hospitals in Torun and Krakow.

In 1939 she was sworn into the Polish Victory Service, and her duties included rescuing wounded officers and soldiers from falling into enemy captivity. After returning to Poznan, she became a liaison officer in the Health Department of the "Ojczyzna" (Homeland) underground organization and participated in charitable activities and secret training nurses.

Later she served as a liaison officer and cipher and was in charge of the contact box at her workplace, exchanging correspondence of the various branches of the Greater Poland leadership of the Home Army's Union of Retaliation. In 1943 she received orders, false documents for passage to Warsaw and fictitious employment as a nurse, in order to continue her underground activities and take part in training on the new rules of encryption.

During the Warsaw Uprising, she co-organized the sanitary post of the "Zaremba-Piorun" battalion in the premises at 63 Hoża Street. Accompanying the wounded during deportation deep into Germany, she ended up in the Oberlangen stalag. The camp was liberated by the 1st Armored Division Gen. Stanislaw Maczek, to which Pohl-Mizerska was conscripted into the sanitary service.

After returning to Poland in 196, she worked as a nursing inspector in the Health Department of the Voivodship Office in Szczecin and later in Gdansk. In 1959 she was forced to retire on disability due to her health condition. Despite health problems, she continued to be involved in social work and was active in veterans organizations, publishing texts on underground work. For her achievements, she was decorated with, among others the Polish Army Medal and the Medal for her participation in the Defence War. She died on 3 January 1999 and was buried at the Powązki Military Cemetery.
