= General Popov =

General Popov may refer to:

- Ivan Popov (Russian general, born 1975)
- Leonid Popov (born 1945), Soviet Air Force major general
- Markian Popov (1902–1969), Soviet Army general
- Mikhail Popov (general) (born 1963), Bulgarian Land Forces major general
- Vasili Stepanovich Popov (1743–1822), Imperial Russian Army general
- Vasily Popov (Soviet general) (1894–1967), Soviet Army colonel general
