= Teresa Suchecka-Nowak =

Polish Partisian Fighter

Teresa Suchecka-Nowak (1926–2011), was Polish World War II underground fighter, member of Home Army and participant of the Warsaw Uprising.

During the Warsaw Uprising, she was a nurse and a soldier of the 3rd platoon, company B-3 of the "Bałtyk" battalion of the Home Army "Baszta" regiment. For her participation in the attack and capture of a German ammunition car, she was promoted to the rank of senior gunner and awarded the Cross of Valour.

In 1997, she became the godmother of the banner of the Regiment of Protection. Maj. Gen. Boleslaw Wieniawa-Dlugoszowski.

== Awards and decorations ==
Her awards and decorations include:

- Commander's Cross of the Order of Polonia Restituta
- Armia Krajowa Cross
- Warsaw Cross of the Uprising
- Cross of Valour (Poland)
