= Jakub Tomasz Nowakowski =

Polish zoologist and Warsaw Uprising participant (born 1924)

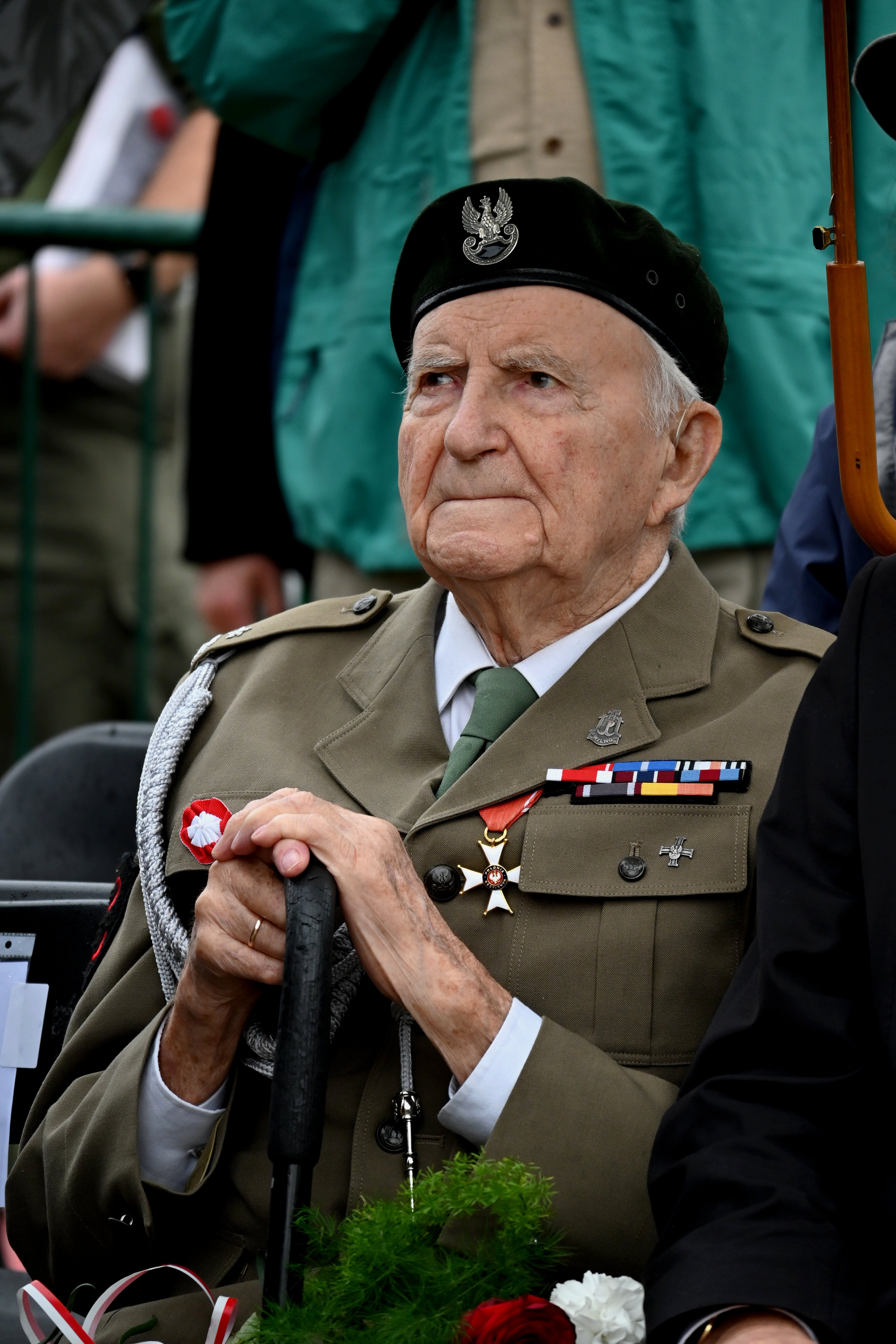

Personal details
- Born: 4 December 1924 (age 101) Warsaw, Second Polish Republic
- Profession: Zoologist
- Awards: Cross of the Order of Polonia Restituta, Centenary Medal of Regained Independence
- Nickname(s): "Tomek", "Tomasz"

Military service
- Allegiance: Poland
- Branch/service: Home Army (AK)
- Years of service: 1943–1945 (during WWII)
- Rank: Major
- Unit: Participant in the Warsaw Uprising
- Battles/wars: World War II: Warsaw Uprising

Jakub Tomasz Nowakowski, pseud. "Tomek", "Tomasz" (born 4 December 1924) is a Polish zoologist, participant of the Warsaw Uprising, independence conspiracy activist during World War II, and a retired major of the Polish Armed Forces.

== Biography ==
Before the World War II, he attended the Military Family Association School on Czarnecki Street in Warsaw, and later the Adam Skwarczyński Public Elementary School. At the outbreak of World War II, he was a student at the Tadeusz Czacki State Men's Gymnasium in Warsaw. During the German occupation, he joined the independence conspiracy within the 1st Platoon - 1st Company "Maciek" – Zośka Battalion – Broda 53 Diversionary Brigade – Kedyw of the Main Command of the Home Army.

When the Warsaw Uprising began, due to the isolation of Żoliborz, he could not join his parent unit and thus fought during the uprising in the ranks of Platoon 226 – Żniwiarz Group – Żoliborz Subdistrict of the Warsaw Home Army District. He participated in the assault on the Warszawa Gdańska station during the attempt to link Żoliborz with the Old Town. After the uprising, he was captured as a prisoner of war in Stalag XI A Altengrabow.

After returning to Poland, he studied biology at Nicolaus Copernicus University in Toruń, and after a year transferred to the University of Poznań. To secure a place in a dormitory, he joined the Society of Fighters for Freedom and Democracy. After graduation, he became an assistant at the Zoology Department. He earned his PhD at the Museum and Institute of Zoology of the Polish Academy of Sciences in Warsaw, where he worked until retirement.

He is a member of the World Association of Home Army Soldiers and the Social Committee for the Care of the Graves of Fallen Soldiers of the Zośka Battalion. In 2022, he was appointed a member of the Office for War Veterans and Victims of Oppression.

== Personal life ==
The son of painter Bogdan Bartłomiej Nowakowski (1887–1945) and Zofia (née Dydzińska), his elder sister, Wanda Nowakowska (1923–2023), also participated in the Warsaw Uprising. His wife was biologist, Irena Totwen-Nowakowska (1924–2023); they had one daughter.

== Awards ==
In 2012, he was awarded the Knight's Cross of the Order of Polonia Restituta; the decoration ceremony took place in 2016 during the 68th anniversary of the Warsaw Uprising. In 2019, he received the Centenary Medal of Regained Independence.
