= Anna Jakubowska =

Polish WWII combatant (1927–2022)

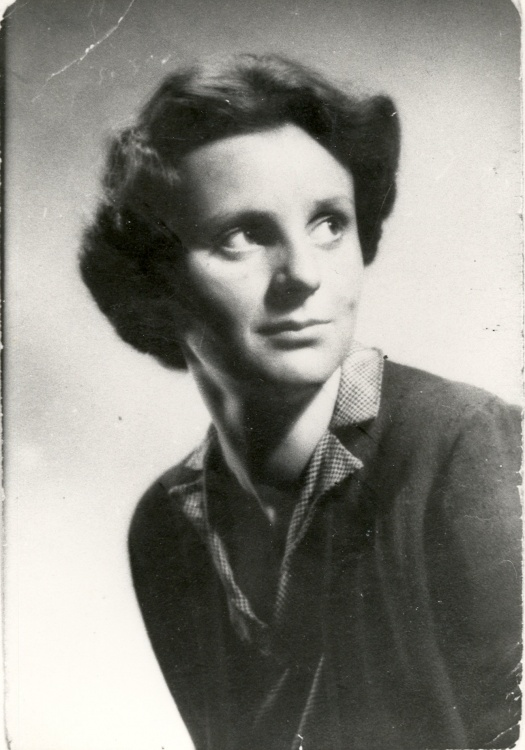
- Born: Anna Teresa Świerczewska; 26 May 1927
- Died: 13 July 2022 (aged 95)

Anna Teresa Jakubowska (née Świerczewska) ps. Paulinka (26 May 1927 – 13 July 2022) was a Polish World War II combatant and community activist, participant of the Warsaw Uprising.

Jakubowska was a member of the Chapter of the Order of Polonia Restituta. She died on 13 July 2022, at the age of 95.

== Decorations ==
- Honorary badge "For Merit for the Protection of Human Rights" by the Polish Commissioner for Human Rights
- 2006: Knight's Cross of the Order of Polonia Restituta
- 1992: Warsaw Uprising Cross
- 1944: Cross of Valour
- 1984: Armia Krajowa Cross
