= Christopher Celiz =

United States Army sergeant and Medal of Honor recipient

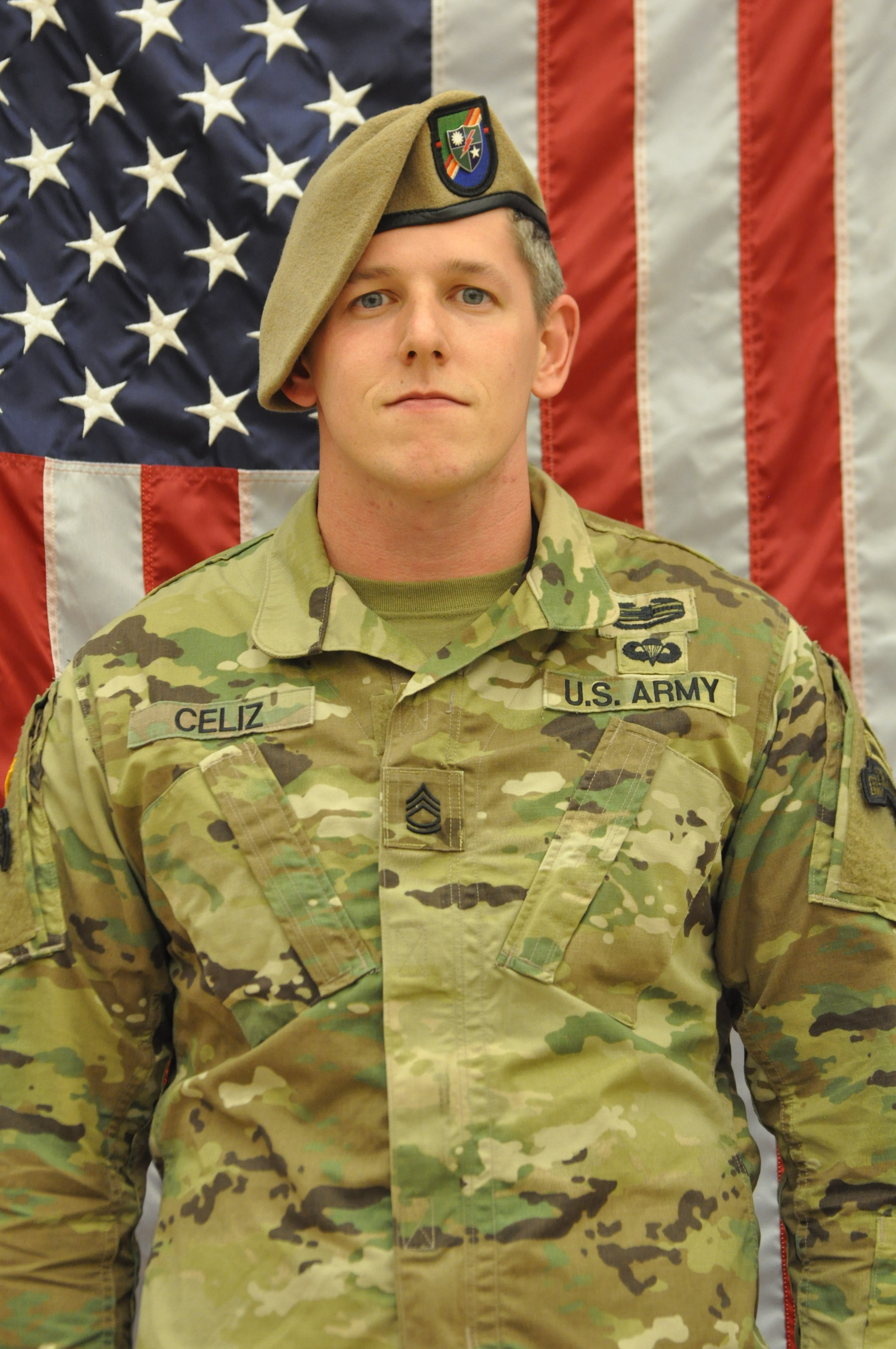
- Born: January 12, 1986; Summerville, South Carolina
- Died: July 12, 2018 (aged 32); Paktia Province, Afghanistan
- Military career
- Allegiance: United States
- Branch: United States Army
- Service years: 2007–2018
- Rank: Sergeant first class
- Units: Company E, 2nd Battalion, 7th Cavalry Regiment; 530th Engineer Clearance Company, 92nd Engineer Battalion; D Company, 1st Ranger Battalion, 75th Ranger Regiment
- Conflicts: Iraq War; War in Afghanistan
- Awards: Medal of Honor; Bronze Star Medal; Purple Heart; Meritorious Service Medal

Christopher Andrew Celiz (January 12, 1986 – July 12, 2018) was a sergeant first class in the United States Army. He was posthumously awarded the Medal of Honor by President Joe Biden on December 16, 2021, for his actions on July 12, 2018. President Biden presented the Medal of Honor to Celiz's family during a ceremony on 16 December 2021, along with Earl Plumlee and the family of Alwyn Cashe. He was the only Jewish recipient of the Medal of Honor in the Global War on Terrorism.

A native of Summerville, South Carolina, Celiz attended The Citadel from 2004 to 2006. He enlisted in the army in 2007.

== Death ==
On July 12, 2018, as the leader of a special operations unit composed of partnered forces and members of the 1st Battalion, 75th Ranger Regiment, Celiz led an operation to clear an area of enemy forces and thereby disrupt future attacks against the government of the Islamic Republic of Afghanistan.

Shortly after his team reached their initial objective, a large enemy force attacked. The enemy placed effective fire on him and his team, preventing them from maneuvering to a counterattack. Realizing the danger to his team and the operation, Celiz voluntarily exposed himself to intense enemy machine-gun and small-arms fire.

Under fire, he retrieved and employed a heavy weapon system, thereby allowing U.S. and partnered forces to regain the initiative, maneuver to a secure location, and begin treating a critically wounded partnered force member.

As the medical evacuation helicopter arrived, it was immediately engaged by accurate and sustained enemy fire. Knowing how critical it was to quickly load the wounded partner, Celiz willingly exposed himself again to heavy enemy fire so he could take charge to direct and lead the evacuation. As the casualty was moved from a position of cover, Celiz made a conscious effort to ensure his body acted as a physical shield to protect his team, the injured partner and the crew of the aircraft from enemy fire. After the wounded partner was loaded, Celiz's team returned to cover, but he remained with the aircraft, returning a high volume of fire and constantly repositioning himself to act as a physical shield to the aircraft and its crew.

With his final reposition, Celiz placed himself directly between the cockpit and the enemy, ensuring the aircraft was able to depart. Upon the helicopter’s liftoff, Celiz was hit by enemy fire. Fully aware of his injury, but understanding the peril to the aircraft, Celiz motioned to Captain Ben Krzeczowski to depart rather than remain to load him. His selfless actions saved the life of the evacuated partnered force member and almost certainly prevented further casualties among other members of his team and the aircrew. Celiz died as a result of his injuries.

== Medal of Honor citation ==

The President of the United States of America, authorized by Act of Congress, March 3, 1863, has posthumously awarded in the name of Congress the Medal of Honor to

Sergeant First Class Christopher A. Celiz, United States Army

For conspicuous gallantry and intrepidity at the risk of his life above and beyond the call of duty:

Sergeant First Class Christopher A. Celiz distinguished himself by conspicuous gallantry above and beyond the call of duty while engaged with the enemy in Paktia Province, Afghanistan, on July 12th, 2018. As the leader of a special purpose unit composed of partnered forces and members of the 1st Battalion, 75th Ranger Regiment, Sergeant First Class Celiz led an operation to clear an area of enemy forces and thereby disrupt future attacks against the government of Afghanistan and allied forces. Shortly after his team reached their final objectives, a large enemy force attacked, placed effective fire on him and his team, preventing them from maneuvering to counterattack. Realizing the danger the attack posed to his team and the operation, Sergeant First Class Celiz voluntarily exposed himself to intense enemy machine-gun and small-arms fire to retrieve and employ a heavy weapon system, thereby allowing U.S. and partnered forces to regain the initiative, maneuver to a secure location, and begin treatment of a critically wounded partnered force member. As a medical evacuation helicopter arrived, it was immediately engaged by accurate and sustained enemy fire. Knowing how critical it was to quickly load the casualty, Sergeant First Class Celiz willingly exposed himself to heavy enemy fire to direct and lead the evacuation. As the casualty moved from a position of cover and out into intense enemy fire, Sergeant First Class Celiz made a conscious effort to ensure his body acted as a physical shield to his team carrying the casualty and the crew of the aircraft. As the casualty was loaded and Sergeant First Class Celiz’s team returned to cover, he alone remained at the aircraft, returning a high volume of fire and constantly repositioning himself to act as a physical shield to the aircraft and its crew. With his final reposition, Sergeant First Class Celiz placed himself directly between the cockpit and the enemy, ensuring the aircraft was able to depart. As the helicopter lifted off, Sergeant First Class Celiz was hit by enemy fire. Fully aware of his own injury but understanding the peril to the aircraft from the intense enemy machine gun fire, Sergeant First Class Celiz motioned to the aircraft to depart rather than remain behind to load him. His selfless actions saved the life of the evacuated partnered force member and almost certainly prevented further casualties among other members of his team and the aircrew. Throughout the entire engagement, Sergeant First Class Celiz significantly changed the course of battle by repeatedly placing himself in extreme danger to protect his team, defeat the enemy, and it ultimately cost him his life. Sergeant First Class Celiz’s extraordinary heroism and selflessness above and beyond the call of duty were in keeping with the highest traditions of military service and reflect great credit upon himself, his unit, and the United States Army.

== Awards and decorations ==
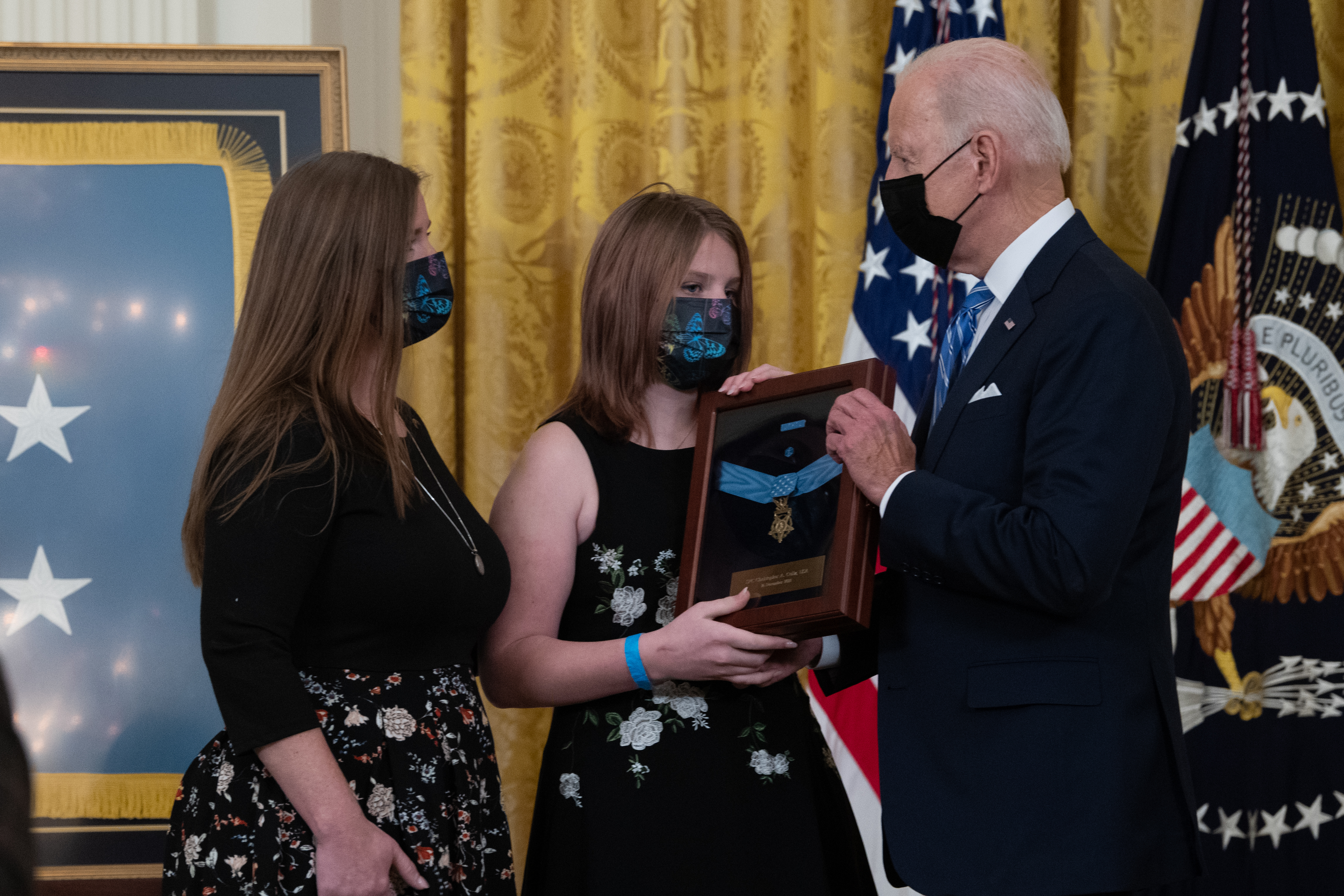
President Biden presents the Medal of Honor to Katherine Celiz, spouse of SFC Celiz, and their daughter Shannon.

Celiz received the following for his military career:

U.S. military decorations
Medal of Honor
Bronze Star Medal
Purple Heart
Meritorious Service Medal
Joint Service Commendation Medal
Army Commendation Medal with 2 bronze Oak leaf clusters
Navy and Marine Corps Commendation Medal
Army Achievement Medal with 4 bronze Oak leaf clusters (5 awards)
Army Good Conduct Medal (3 awards)
U.S. Unit Awards
Meritorious Unit Commendation with 1 bronze Oak leaf cluster
U.S. Service (Campaign) Medals and Service and Training Ribbons
National Defense Service Medal
Afghanistan Campaign Medal with 3 bronze Campaign stars
Iraq Campaign Medal with 2 bronze Campaign stars
Global War on Terrorism Expeditionary Medal
Global War on Terrorism Service Medal
NCO Professional Development Ribbon with award numeral 3
Army Service Ribbon
Army Overseas Service Ribbon with award numeral 3
NATO Medal for service with ISAF

Badges
Combat Action Badge
Basic Parachutist Badge with 1st Ranger Battalion background trimming
Expert Marksmanship Badge with Rifle Component Bar
Ranger tab
Sapper Tab
1st Ranger Battalion Combat Service Identification Badge
75th Ranger Regiment Distinctive Unit Insignia
7 Overseas Service Bars
3 Service stripes

== See also ==
- List of post-Vietnam Medal of Honor recipients
- U.S. Army Medal of Honor Feature article
