= Jan Mazurkiewicz =

Polish military leader (1896–1988)

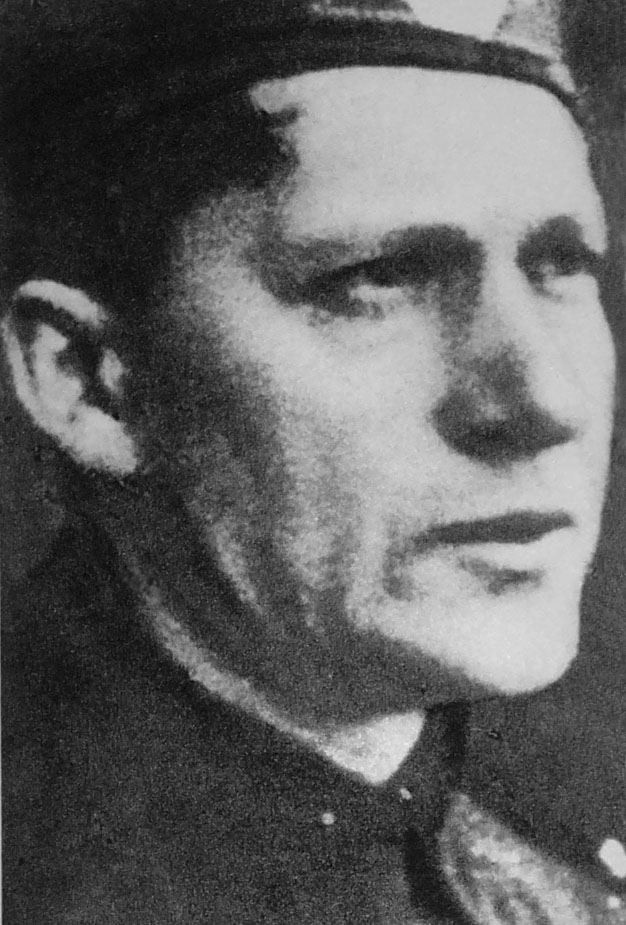
- Lt. Col. Jan Mazurkiewicz during the Warsaw Uprising
- Born: 27 August 1896; Lemberg, Austria-Hungary
- Died: 4 May 1988 (aged 91); Warsaw, Polish People’s Republic
- Military career
- Service years: 1914–1945
- Rank: Brigadier general
- Nicknames: Zagłoba, Socha, Sęp, Radosław
- Units: Founder and commander of Tajna Organizacja Wojskowa (1939–1943); Commander of Kedyw (1944–1945); Commander of Radosław Group 1945; Commander of General district of Delegatura Sił Zbrojnych na Kraj 1945; Brigadier general, People's Army of Poland 1980–1988 Vice president of Związek Bojowników o Wolność i Demokrację
- Conflicts: World War I Polish–Soviet War; World War II; Invasion of Poland; Operation Tempest; Warsaw Uprising
- Awards: Order of Virtuti Militari; Cross of Independence with Swords; Cross of Valour; Warsaw Uprising Cross
- Other work: Veterans' rights activist

Jan Mazurkiewicz, pseudonym: "Zagłoba", "Socha", "Sęp", "Radosław" (27 August 1896 – 4 May 1988) was a Polish military leader and politician, colonel of Home Army and brigadier general of the Polish People's Army. Founder of the Secret Military Organization (later merged with the Home Army), commander of Kedyw and the Radosław Group during Warsaw Uprising. After the war, he was a political prisoner of the Stalinist period (until 1956). From 1964 he was vice-president of Society of Fighters for Freedom and Democracy.

== Early life and World War I ==
Jan Mazurkiewicz was born in a craftsman's family in Lviv. He spent his childhood in Zolochiv, where from 1902 he attended primary school and from 1906 to the gymnasium. He was active in Scouting, a member of the "Sokół" (Falcon) Polish Gymnastic Society. In 1911 he moved with his family to Lviv, where he continued his education. He was a member of the Organisation of Independent Youth Zarzewie, and later belonged to the Riflemen's Association.

After a short training, he joined the 1st Brigade of Polish Legions, in which he was a soldier of the 1st battalion company. Then he was assigned to the marching battalion of captain Leon Berbecki and in his ranks took part in December 1914 at the Battle of Łowczówek. He was wounded and captured by the Russians. He escaped from it in June 1915, after which he managed to get back to his unit. In October wounded again, then he underwent treatment in the hospital.

As a sergeant, in July 1916 he was transferred to the 1st Brigade of Legions, in which he served until the oath crisis. He was arrested on 4 September 1917 and imprisoned in Przemyśl. He was threatened with the death penalty for active participation in the crisis. Shortly thereafter he was released and forced to join the Austro-Hungarian Army, from which he deserted in March 1918. He broke into the Polish II Corps in Russia commanded by general Józef Haller, in whose ranks he took part in the Battle of Kaniów. After escaping from German captivity, he got to the Polish Military Organisation in Kiev. He took part in numerous subversive actions and battles with German, and Ukrainian troops. He also infiltrated Austrian troops.

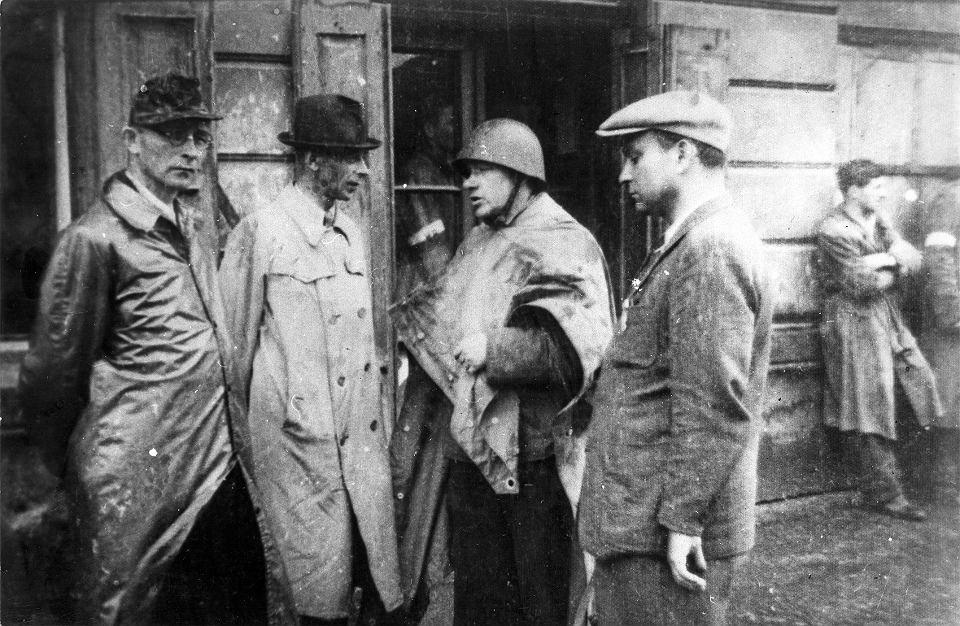
From the left: Major Wacław Janszek "Bolek" (Chief of Staff "Radosław"), General Tadeusz Bór-Komorowski, Lieutenant Colonel Jan Mazurkiewicz, "Radosław", and Captain Ryszard Krzywicki, "Szymon"

== Interwar period ==
From November 1918 he was a soldier of the Polish Army. Later, he was assigned to the Second Department of Polish General Staff. During the Polish–Soviet War, he served as a military courier (he imported, among others, Józef Piłsudski's letters to Symon Petliura) and a counterintelligence officer. In 1922, he was transferred to the military reserve for a short period and assigned to the 8th Legions' Infantry Regiment. From 1924 he served in the 13th Infantry Division. He took part in preparations for the May Coup. From 1930 to 1934, under the cover of an inspector of the Riflemen's Association, he conducted counterintelligence activities against the Soviet Union in Vilnius and Brest.

In 1934 he completed the course of the battalion commanders at the Infantry Training Center in Rembertów. From 1938 to 1939 he was a lecturer in tactics at courses for company commanders.

== World War II and Warsaw Uprising ==
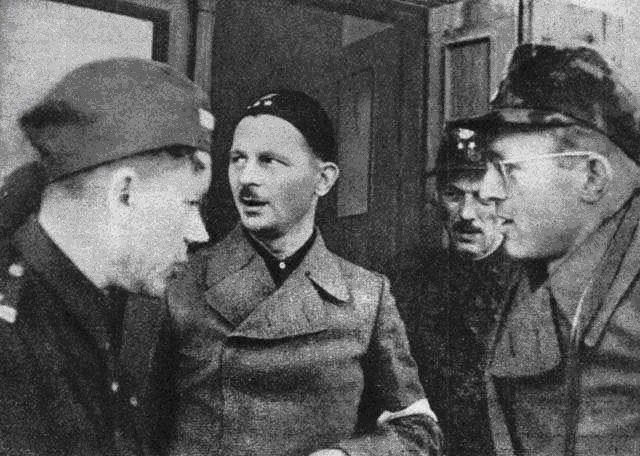
From the left: Lieutenant Colonel Jan Mazurkiewicz, Major Wacław Chojna and Lieutenant Stanisław Wierzyński

During the Invasion of Poland, he was the head of a diversion on the southwestern front section. After the Soviet invasion of Poland, he founded the Secret Military Organization (TOW) in Stanisławów. On 19 September 1939, he crossed the Polish-Hungarian border, transferring the organization's headquarters to Budapest. Then he went to France, where he met with general Władysław Sikorski. In June 1940 he returned to the country and assumed the function of the Commander-in-Chief of TOW, an independent combat and subversive organization operating according to the guidelines of the Union of Armed Struggle.

In March 1943, after merging TOW with Kedyw he became the deputy head of the organization, colonel Emil August Fieldorf. On 1 February 1944, he took the post of commander of Kedyw.

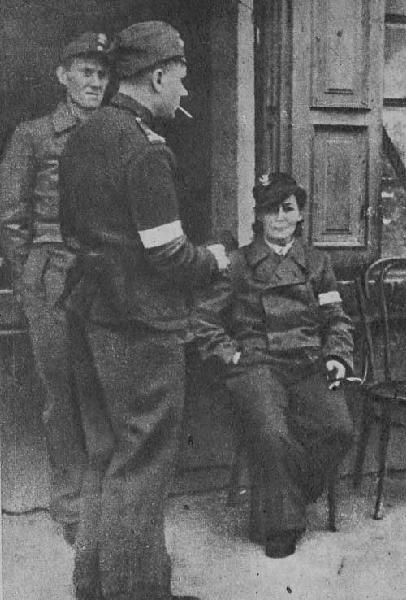
Jan Mazurkiewicz, "Radosław" (standing sideways) in Wola. Sitting on the chair is his wife Anna Mazurkiewicz, "Irma".

Shortly before the outbreak of the Warsaw Uprising, Mazurkiewicz was made commander of the Radosław Group. This force was one of the largest, best trained and equipped Polish units in the uprising. After the initiation of the uprising, the unit seized major portions of the Wola suburbs, and subsequently defended it against German attacks carried out by troops under the command of SS Gruppenführer Heinz Reinefarth and Standartenführer Oskar Dirlewanger. One of the battalions of the group, Battalion Zośka, liberated the Gęsiówka concentration camp located within Warsaw and freed 384 prisoners (mainly Jews), most of whom then joined the unit. The Radosław Group fought its way to Warsaw Old Town borough when further defense in Wola became impossible. In the areas of Wola that Reinefarth's and Dirlewanger's troops recaptured from the insurgents, at least 40,000 civilians and prisoners of war were murdered in the Wola massacre. (Note: Oskar Dirlewanger was killed after the war in unknown circumstances likely by prison guards (see: Interview with historian Janusz Roszkowski in Focus.pl below). Reinefarth was never charged with a war crime. After the war he served as a mayor, and a member of the Landtag in Schleswig-Holstein, and was awarded a general's pension by the West German government. He died in 1979.) On 11 August he was seriously wounded during the fighting

On 15 September 1944, he sent his liaison officer to the east bank of the Vistula in order to establish contact with the troops of the First Polish Army. In the absence of sufficient assistance on their part, on 20 September he ordered his decimated units to leave Czerniaków and pass through the sewers to Mokotów. He left his soldiers a free hand - they could decide whether they would go to German captivity or leave the city with the civilian population. Shortly before the order was signed, Mazurkiewicz was officially promoted to the rank of colonel, by general Tadeusz Bór-Komorowski, the commander of the uprising.

He did not go into captivity, he left the ruins of the destroyed capital with his wife. He continued his underground activity in Częstochowa, where the headquarters of the Home Army was located.

== In post-war Poland ==
After the dissolution of the Home Army on 19 January 1945 and the capture of Częstochowa by the Red Army, he took the leadership of the Central Area of the NIE. Later he became a delegate to the Central Area of the Armed Forces Delegation for Poland, under which he conducted further underground activities against communist authorities.

In the end, he gave up further conspiracy, considering the resistance pointless. On 1 August 1945, he and his wife were arrested by officers of the Ministry of Public Security. He was released after a month, he headed the so-called Central Liquidation Commission of the Home Army. On 8 September he turned to former Home Army soldiers and people remaining in the underground to call for disclosure and amnesty. For some officers, this was disapproved and even accused of treason. As a result of his appeal, about 50,000 former members of the armed underground were revealed. On 12 September captain Stanisław Sojczyński, the leader of the Underground Polish Army, sent an open letter to colonel Mazurkiewicz, in which he criticized him and called him a "traitor".

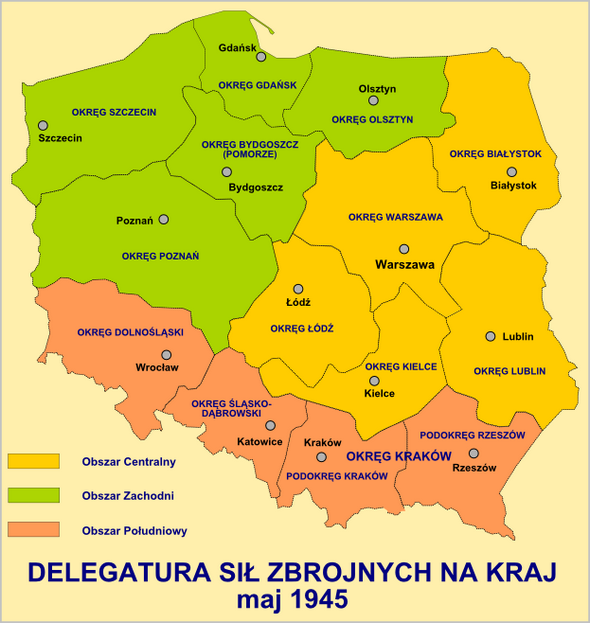
Structure of Armed Forces Delegation for Poland (yellow marked area commanded by Mazurkiewicz)

Mazurkiewicz established the Committee for the Care of the Graves of Fallen Soldiers of the Radosław Group. He was in constant contact with his former soldiers, whom he helped find in the difficult post-war years. Through his extensive contacts, he sought employment for his former soldiers - often war invalids. Later, the Stalinist authorities accused him that they were "secret underground meetings aimed at overthrowing the power of the Polish People's Republic".

On 4 February 1949, he was arrested again. Throughout the investigation, he was forced to testify incriminatingly against the first head of Kedyw, general August Emil Fieldorf, but his relentless attitude resulted in the resignation from attempting to use him as a prosecution witness in the political trial against General. On 16 November 1953, his main trial took place before the Military District Court in Warsaw. On the same day, based on crafted evidence, without admitting defense witnesses, he was convicted for life imprisonment. He served his sentence in Wronki Prison, from where he was released as a result of amnesty for political prisoners in May 1956. In 1957 he was rehabilitated.

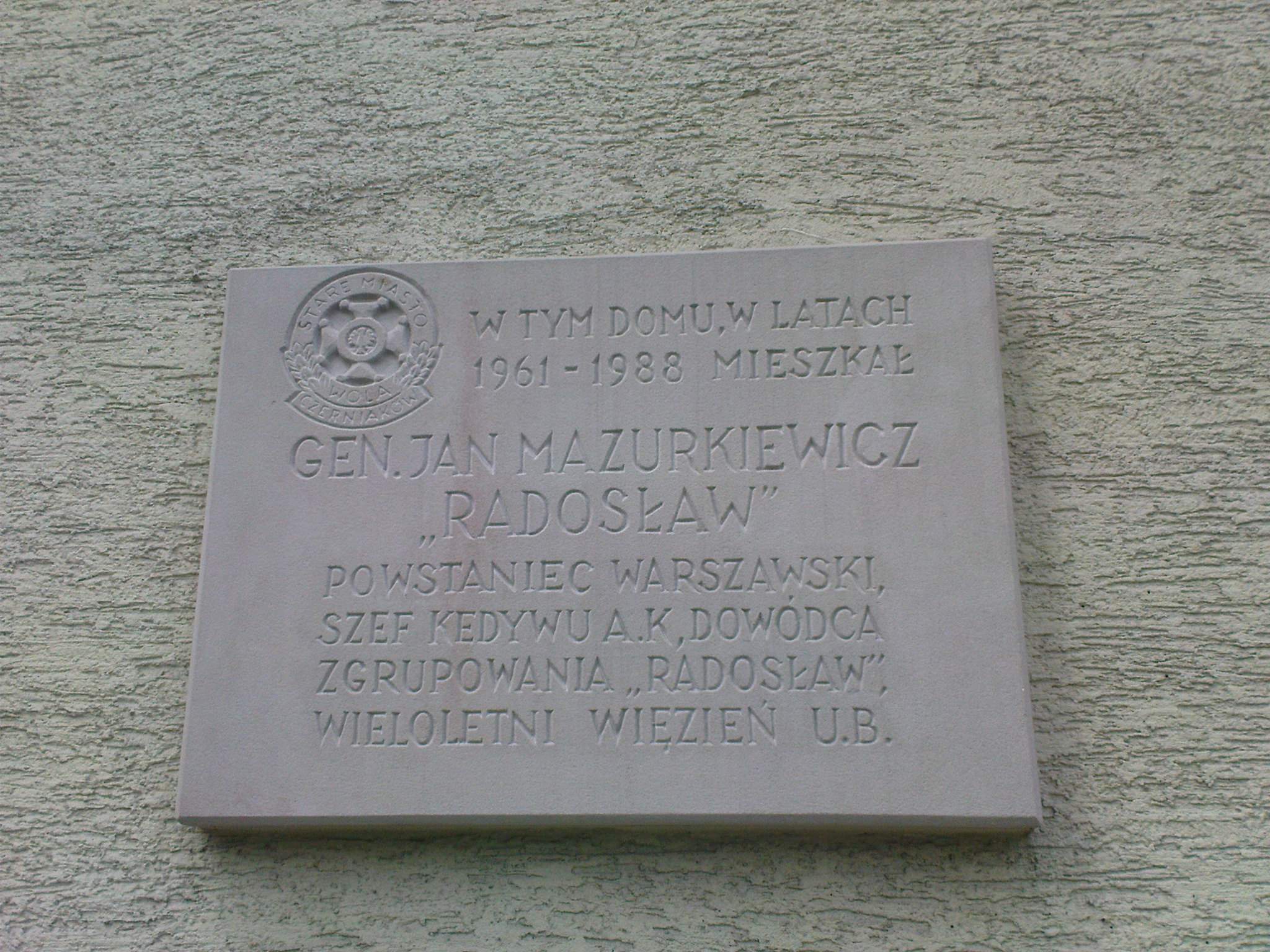
Commemorative plaque dedicated to Mazurkiewicz in Warsaw

After being released, he took up craft. In 1958, he opened (formally registered to his wife) the "Wiklina" cafe, which he ran until the 1970s. Later he handed it over to the Trade Cooperative of Invalids. By resolution Polish Council of State in October 1980, he was promoted to the rank of brigadier general. He solemnly received his general nomination in Belweder from the professor Henryk Jabłoński.

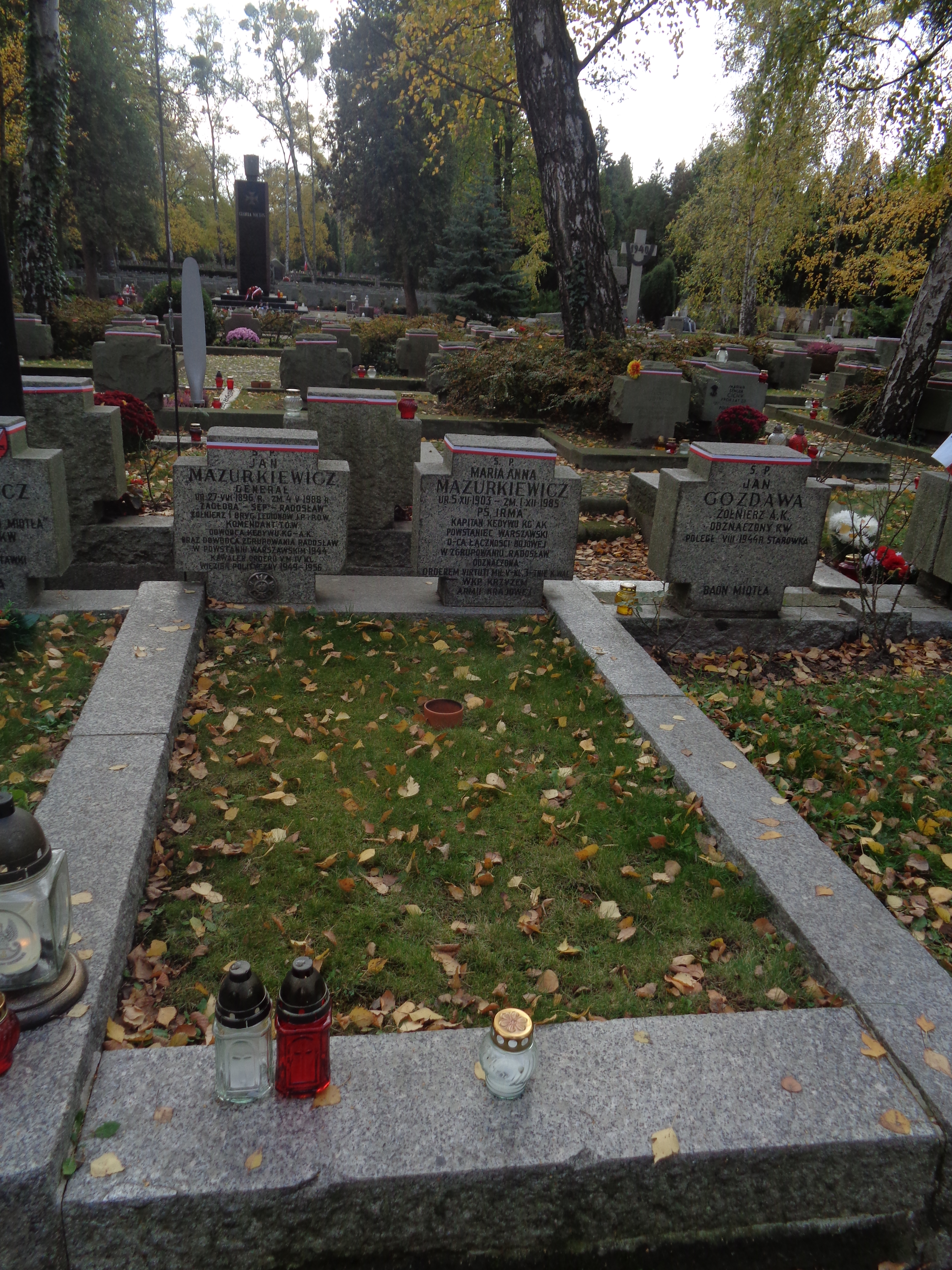
The grave of Jan Mazurkiewicz

After 1956, he was active in the veterans' right activism. From 1964 he was vice-president of Society of Fighters for Freedom and Democracy.

In August 1981, on the occasion of the 37th anniversary of the outbreak of the Warsaw Uprising, Telewizja Polska broadcast a documentary in which Mazurkiewicz talked about the real "Soviet assistance to insurgent units of the Home Army". From 1981 to 1983 he was a member of the presidium of the Front of National Unity. In 1983 he was elected a member of the Patriotic Movement for National Rebirth. From 1981 he was the chairman of the commission for the Warsaw Uprising Cross. In the second half of the 1980s, general Jan Mazurkiewicz, then the highest-performing and functioning former Home Army officer in Poland, became part of the Social Committee for the Construction of the Warsaw Uprising Monument, which was unveiled on 1 August 1989, after his death.

He died in May 1988 and was buried at Powązki Military Cemetery. His funeral was attended by representatives of the highest state authorities, including generals Wojciech Jaruzelski and Florian Siwicki, professor Henryk Jabłoński and Jan Dobraczyński.

== Honors and awards ==
- Commander's Cross with Star of Order of Polonia Restituta
- Order of the Cross of Grunwald, 2nd Class
- Commander's Cross of Order of Polonia Restituta
- Golden Cross of the Order of Virtuti Militari
- Knight's Cross of Order of Polonia Restituta
- Silver Cross of the Order of Virtuti Militari
- Cross of Independence with Swords
- Cross of Valour – eleven times
- Golden Cross of Merit
- Silver Cross of Merit- twice
- Warsaw Uprising Cross (1981)
- Cross of the Home Army
- Medal "For participation in the defensive war of 1939"
- Medal of Merit for National Defence

== Military ranks ==
- Kapitan (Captain) - 1922
- Major (Major) - before 1939
- Podpułkownik (Lieutenant colonel) - 13 April 1943
- Pułkownik (Colonel) - 2 October 1944
- Generał brygady (Brigadier general - 9 October 1980

== Personal life ==
Mazurkiewicz's first wife was Jadwiga, with whom he had three children, Stanislaw and Zofia, and an older son who died in infancy. His wife and daughter were imprisoned by the Russians in the east of the country during the war, but his son escaped to England where he fought with the Polish Army based in Scotland before returning to Poland some years later.

His second wife was Maria Zienkiewicz, alias "Irma" (1903–1985), captain of the Home Army.

He had a brother, Franciszek Mazurkiewicz (1901–1944), an officer in the Polish Army who died during the Warsaw Uprising.
