= Halina Najder =

Polish-British literary translator (1926–2017)

Halina Najder, née Halina Teresa Paschalska, later Halina Carroll (7 October 1926 – 4 February 2017) was a Polish-British translator of English literature and a veteran of the Warsaw Uprising 1944.

== Background ==
She was the younger daughter of Władysław Paschalski (died 1927), owner of a machine factory connected to the tobacco industry, and his wife, Irena née Górska (1890-1990).

During World War II she enlisted as a teenager in the Resistance as part of the Grey Ranks and the Home Army. From January 1942 she belonged to the medical and liaison platoon of the "Wigry" battalion in the Warsaw area. She completed her undercover schooling with the Infantry Cadet Reserve, "Agricola”. She participated in the uprising with her original formation in the rank of a medic and liaison trooper, with the pseudonyms, "Hala Danowska”, "Danowska” or plain, "Hala". Nearing the end of hostilities, on 2 October 1944, she left the capital among the civilian throngs.

== Career ==
After the war, she entered the University of Warsaw to study Polish language and literature. Against the background of communist repressions of former members of the Home Army, she elected to enter into a fictitious marriage with a family friend, Krystyn Kleniewski, who had British citizenship and emigrate to the United Kingdom after 1946. In England, she met and later married the British The Sunday Times journalist,,Nicholas Carroll, with whom she had two children. After the collapse of the marriage ,Carroll became the step-father of the actress, Rula Lenska and her sisters - she met a Polish post-graduate student in Oxford, Zdzisław Najder, with whom she collaborated in literary work and whom she married in 1965. It was a second marriage for both. In 1969, with her new husband and her own two children, she decided to return to Poland. Between 1976 and 1981, she was active in the "Polskie Porozumienie Niepodległościowe", a dissident political movement founded by her husband. With the declaration of Martial law in Poland, in December 1981, she and her family fled abroad. Her husband Zdzisław, became chief of the Polish-language section of Munich-based Radio Free Europe (RFE) in April 1982. In response, the Polish government under the leadership of Wojciech Jaruzelski accused her husband of spying for United States intelligence services and sentenced him to death in absentia. She and her husband did not return to their native country until the fall of communism in 1989.

She translated English literature into Polish. Among her translations were: Joseph Conrad's Typhoon, Prince Roman, The Secret Agent and Selected Letters. She also translated E.M. Forster's A Room with a View and work by American historian, Martin Malia. Among the works she translated into English from their Polish original, were the plays of Zbigniew Herbert and her husband's Conrad studies.

She died on 4 February 2017 in Warsaw, having been nursed to the end by her husband. She was buried in Powązki Cemetery.

== Awards ==
- Order of Polonia Restituta – posthumously on 14 August 2017, for services to Polish literature and culture.
- Polish Army Medal Medal Wojska – twice
- Krzyż Armii Krajowej
- Warszawski Krzyż Powstańczy
- Award "Weteran Walk o Wolność i Niepodległość Ojczyzny” (Veteran of Battles for Freedom and Independence)

== Selected translations ==
- Conrad's Polish background : letters to and from Polish friends / edited by Zdzislaw Najder; translated by Halina Carroll.
- Conrad, Joseph, 1857–1924.; Najder, Zdzisław, editor. Carroll, Halina, translator. London: Oxford University Press; 1964
- Najder, Zdzisław. Joseph Conrad: A Chronicle. Trans. Halina Carroll-Najder. Rutgers University Press, 1983.
- Zdzisław Najder. “Conrad and the idea of honour”. [In:] Conrad in Perspective. Essays on Art and Fidelity. Cambridge: Cambridge University Press, 1997, cf.: Zdzisław Najder. “Conrad i tradycyjne pojęcie honoru”. [In:] Sztuka i wierność. Szkice o twórczości Josepha Conrada. Trans. Halina Najder. Opole: Wydawnictwo Uniwersytetu Opolskiego, 2000

== Bibliography ==
- Robert Bielecki (1991). Batalion harcerski "Wigry". Warszawa: Wydawnictwo „Historia”. ISBN 83-900250-0-0.
