= Miloš Koterec =

Slovak politician (born 1962)

Miloš Koterec (born 11 October 1962, in Partizánske) is a career diplomat from Slovakia.

He was sent to the Permanent Mission of Slovakia to the United Nations from 1995 to 1999. He then went on to work at the Permanent Mission to NATO for Slovakia in 2001. In 2005 he was elected as a Member of the European Parliament for Slovakia.

In 2009, he was appointed Permanent Representative to the United Nations for Slovakia.

He received the Gold Polish Army Medal in 2012.

in 2025, Koterec was appointed the first resident Ambassador to the Philippines, with accreditation for the neighbouring republic of Palau.

== See also ==
- List of current permanent representatives to the United Nations

Miloš Koterec is now serving as president of the economic and social council of the United nations, he became president on the tenth of January 2012 after serving as senior Vice-president of the council in 2011.
