= Secret Military Organization =

WW2 Polish resistance organisation

Secret Military Organization, or Tajna Organizacja Wojskowa, TOW in Polish, was a clandestine military formation organized prior to World War II in the Second Polish Republic in the event Polish territory was occupied by foreign powers. The country-wide TOW organization was active in the early days of the September 1939 Campaign and during the Nazi occupation of Poland. Some of the offshoots or independently organized local "TOWs", such as Tajna Organizacja Wojskowa Gryf Pomorski ("TOW Pomeranian Griffin") or Tajna Organizacja Wojskowa Gryf Kaszubski ("TOW Kaszubian Griffin") were active throughout the whole period of the German occupation as well as the early years of the Soviet takeover.

During the interwar period, Polish intelligence services in the Grupa Operacyjnej Dywersji (Operational Group for Diversion) developed contingency plans for creating an underground movement in case the country was occupied by either Nazi Germany or Soviet Russia. The sub unit within this service codenamed Zygmunt was charged with preparing diversionary and sabotage actions to be carried out during the possible occupation.

The main, country-wide, TOW was organized by Major (later colonel) Jan Mazurkiewicz, codename Radosław, in late 1939, in Stanisławów, after the Polish defeat in the September campaign. Mazurkiewicz's founding of the group received approval from Gen. Władysław Sikorski and the Polish government in exile. Originally the coordinating headquarters of this TOW were located in Budapest, but were transferred to occupied Poland in 1940. In March 1943 the main TOW became part of the general anti-Nazi organization the Home Army and the cells of the organization were transformed or transferred into the newly organized "Directorate for Diversion", Kedyw.

Some of the other TOWs, such as the Pomeranian Griffin, continued to exist independently of the Home Army, or were only nominally subordinated to it.
