= Alwyn Cashe =

U.S. Army soldier and Medal of Honor recipient (1970–2005)

Alwyn C. Cashe
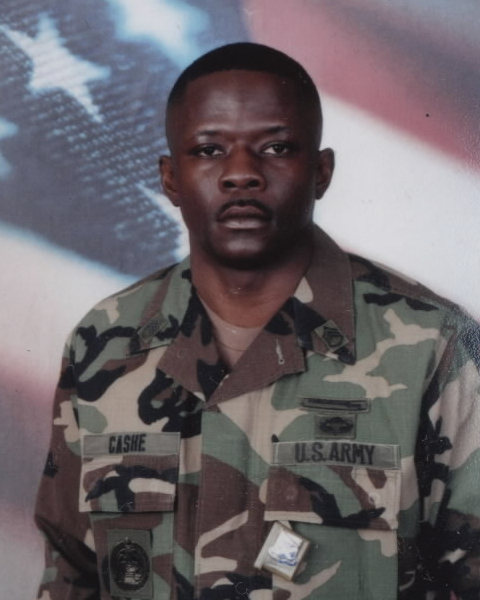
- Born: Alwyn Crendall Cashe; July 13, 1970; Sanford, Florida, U.S.
- Died: November 8, 2005 (aged 35); San Antonio, Texas, U.S.
- Burial place: Restlawn Cemetery, Sanford, Florida, U.S.
- Children: 2
- Military career
- Allegiance: United States
- Branch: United States Army
- Service years: 1988–2005
- Rank: Sergeant First Class
- Units: 1st Battalion, 15th Infantry Regiment, 3rd Infantry Division
- Conflicts: Gulf War; Iraq War †
- Awards: Medal of Honor; Purple Heart

Alwyn Crendall Cashe (July 13, 1970 – November 8, 2005) was a United States Army senior non-commissioned officer who was posthumously awarded the Medal of Honor for heroism in Iraq. On November 10, 2020, the United States Congress voted to upgrade Cashe's initially awarded Silver Star to the Medal of Honor. On December 16, 2021, more than 16 years after his death at age 35, Cashe's widow, Tamara, accepted the Medal of Honor from President Joe Biden at a ceremony commemorating the actions of Cashe and two fellow soldiers for their acts in separate battles.

== Early life and education ==
Cashe was born in Sanford, Florida, on July 13, 1970. He was raised in Oviedo, Florida, and attended Oviedo High School, graduating in 1988.

== Military career ==
Cashe enlisted in the United States Army following high school graduation in 1988. As an infantryman, he deployed in support of the 1991 Gulf War. He also deployed to the former Yugoslavia, earning the Kosovo Campaign Medal. Prior to his assignment to 3rd Infantry Division, he deployed once again to Iraq in support of Operation Iraqi Freedom following the 2003 invasion.

During his time in service he also served as a drill sergeant.

On the evening of October 17, 2005, Cashe, a member of A Company, 1st Battalion, 15th Infantry Regiment, 3rd Infantry Division, saved the lives of six of his fellow soldiers after the Bradley fighting vehicle they were riding in struck an improvised explosive device. Despite suffering second and third-degree burns over 72% of his body, Cashe continued pulling soldiers out of the burning Bradley. Cashe eventually succumbed to his injuries on November 8, 2005, at Brooke Army Medical Center, Fort Sam Houston, Texas. Cashe is interred at Restlawn Cemetery in Sanford, Florida.

== Legacy ==
On July 19, 2014, a new U.S. Army Reserve Center in Sanford, Florida was named in Cashe's honor. On May 11, 2019, the Oviedo Post Office was renamed in Cashe's honor.

On July 23, 2020, Alwyn Cashe's son, Andrew Cashe, graduated One Station Unit Training (OSUT) for Infantry soldiers at Fort Moore, Georgia.

On May 20, 2021, 3rd Infantry Division at Fort Stewart, GA renamed their primary ceremonial grounds from “Marne Gardens” to “Cashe Gardens”. Located next to the Division Headquarters, Cashe Gardens is utilized by the installation for Battalion, Brigade, and Division Changes of Command as well as other high-profile ceremonies.

=== Campaign to upgrade Cashe's Silver Star to the Medal of Honor ===
Gary Brito, Cashe's battalion commander at the time of the action, did not initially realize the extent of Cashe's injuries and the pain he must have been in when he nominated Cashe for the Silver Star award. Witnesses were evacuated for medical treatment and unavailable for statement. Brito subsequently submitted additional statements to the Army to justify upgrading Cashe's award to the Medal of Honor. Brito continued to support efforts to upgrade Cashe's Silver Star to the Medal of Honor

On October 17, 2019, the 14th anniversary of Cashe's actions, three members of Congress wrote to Defense Secretary Mark Esper and Army Secretary Ryan McCarthy formally requesting an upgrade of Cashe's award to the Medal of Honor. The letter was authored by retired Navy SEAL Dan Crenshaw, former Special Forces officer Michael Waltz, and Stephanie Murphy.

On August 24, 2020, Secretary of Defense, Mark Esper, agreed that Cashe's actions merited award of the Medal of Honor. On September 22, 2020, the U.S. House of Representatives unanimously passed a bill, introduced by Rep. Stephanie Murphy (D-FL), which allowed Cashe to finally receive the Medal of Honor. HR 8276 waived a five-year time statute of limitations that expired for normal consideration for Medal of Honor awards by directly authorizing the President to award the medal “for acts of valor during Operation Iraqi Freedom.”

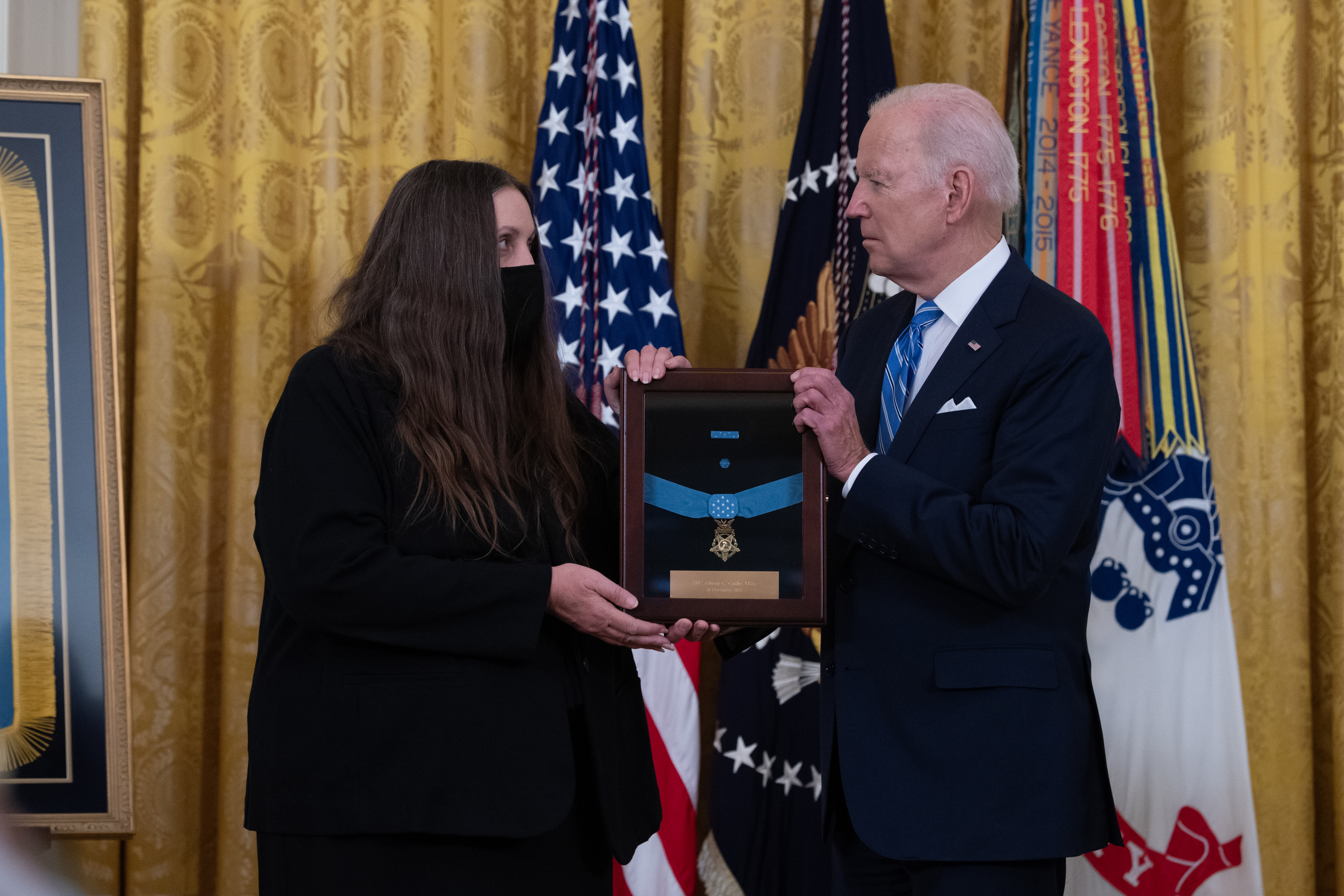
Cashe's wife Tamara accepts the Medal of Honor on her husband's behalf during a ceremony at the White House on December 16, 2021.

On September 28, 2020, Pittsburgh Steelers left tackle Alejandro Villanueva, a former US Army ranger, taped Cashe's name on the back of his helmet, covering the name of Antwon Rose Jr, who was killed by an East Pittsburgh policeman in June 2018. The team had previously decided to honor Rose. Villanueva stated his actions were intended to support the campaign to award Cashe the Medal of Honor.

On November 10, 2020, the Senate passed legislation that cleared the way for Cashe to be awarded the Medal of Honor.

On December 4, 2020, President Donald Trump signed H.R. 8276, which authorized the President to posthumously award the Medal of Honor to Alwyn C. Cashe.

=== Awarding of the Medal of Honor ===
It was hoped by members of Cashe's family and several U.S. House Representatives that the award ceremony would take place as fast as possible. However, on January 11, 2021, it was announced that it was now expected to happen after President Biden assumed office on January 20. President Biden awarded three Medals of Honor, to Cashe's family, Earl Plumlee and the family of Christopher Celiz, in a ceremony on December 16, 2021.

== Awards and decorations ==
=== Silver Star ===
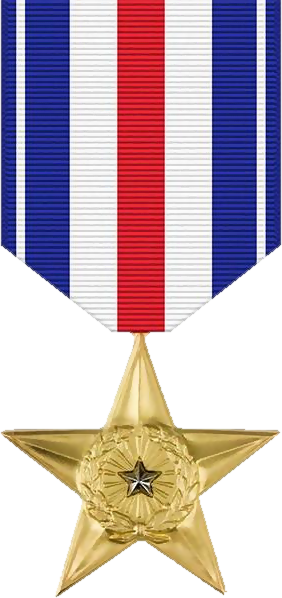

Alwyn Crendall Cashe
Rank and organization: Sergeant First Class, U.S. Army, Company A, 1st Battalion, 15th Infantry Regiment, 3rd Infantry Division
Place and date: Iraq, 17 October 2005
Awarded for actions during: Global War on Terror
Born: July 13, 1970, Thompson, Georgia

Citation:

The President of the United States of America, authorized by Act of Congress July 9, 1918 (amended by an act of July 25, 1963), takes pride in presenting the Silver Star (Posthumously) to Sergeant First Class Alwyn Crendall Cashe, United States Army, for exceptionally valorous achievement following an improvised explosive device explosion on 17 October 2005, while serving with Company A, 1st Battalion, 15th Infantry Regiment, 3d Infantry Division, during combat operations in support of Operation IRAQI FREEDOM. Sergeant First Class Cashe's disregard for his own safety proved evident when he saved the lives of six fellow soldiers despite his serious injuries. His bravery is in keeping with the finest traditions of military heroism and reflect distinct credit upon himself, Task Force DRAGON, the SLEDGEHAMMER Brigade, Task Force LIBERTY, and the United States Army. NARRATIVE TO ACCOMPANY AWARD: Sergeant First Class Alwyn Crendall Cashe heroically distinguished himself by exceptionally valorous conduct in the face of the enemy of the United States as a Platoon Sergeant in 1st Platoon, Alpha Company (HARDOCK), 1st Battalion, 15th Infantry Regiment stationed at Forward Operating Base MACKENZIE, Iraq, on 17 October 2005. On the evening of 17 October 2005, Sergeant First Class Cashe's heroic actions saved the lives of six of his fellow soldiers. At approximately 1920 hours, 1st Platoon of Alpha Company, 1-15 Infantry departed FOB MACKENZIE to conduct a route clearance in the city of Daliaya, Iraq. Along Route JAIME, the lead Bradley Fighting Vehicle, of which Sergeant First Class Cashe was gunner having just moved from a NMC vehicle, struck a victim detonated pressure-switch IED at grid MC 25357243. The blast ignited the fuel cell on the vehicle causing fuel to spew everywhere. The vehicle came to a stop and immediately erupted in flames. Sergeant First Class Cashe was initially slightly injured and drenched with fuel. Despite his condition, he bravely managed to get out of the gunner's hatch, crawl down the BFV and assist the driver out of the driver's hatch. The driver had been burned and Sergeant First Class Cashe extinguished his flames. The following minutes were crucial. Six soldiers and a translator were in the back of the Bradley. Flames had engulfed the entire vehicle from the bottom and were coming out of every portal. The squad leader inside the vehicle managed to open the troop hatch door to help the soldiers escape. Without regard for his personal safety, Sergeant First Class Cashe rushed to the back of the vehicle, reaching into the hot flames and started pulling out his soldiers. The flames gripped his fuel soaked uniform. Flames quickly spread all over his body. Despite the terrible pain, Sergeant First Class Cashe placed the injured soldier on the ground and returned to the burning vehicle to retrieve another burning soldier; all the while, he was still on fire. A crew from a trail Bradley arrived within moments and assisted with CASEVAC. During all this and with severe burns, Sergeant First Class Cashe bravely continued to take control of the chaos. Within minutes, the company First Sergeant was on the scene and began to evacuate the seriously injured soldiers. One of which was Sergeant First Class Cashe. In the end, the national translator was killed in action, and 10 soldiers were injured. Seven of the ten were very seriously injured. Sergeant First Class Cashe stayed a hero through it all. His injuries were the worst as he suffered from 2d and 3d degree burns over 72% of his body. Sergeant First Class Cashe's heroic actions saved the lives of six of his beloved soldiers. He is truly deserving of this award. His actions are in keeping with the finest traditions of military heroism and reflect distinct credit upon himself, Task Force LIBERTY and the United States Army.

=== Medal of Honor ===
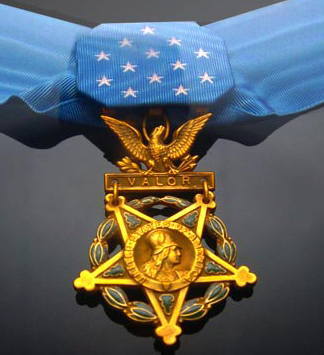

Alwyn Crendall Cashe
Rank and organization: Sergeant First Class, U.S. Army, Company A, 1st Battalion, 15th Infantry Regiment, 3rd Infantry Division
Place and date: Salah Ad Din Province, Iraq, 17 October 2005
Awarded for actions during: Global War on Terror
Born: July 13, 1970, Thompson, Georgia

Citation:

The President of the United States of America, authorized by Act of Congress March 3rd, 1863, has posthumously awarded in the name of Congress the Medal of Honor to Sergeant First Class Alwyn C. Cashe, United States Army, for conspicuous gallantry at the risk of his life above and beyond the call of duty. Sergeant First Class Alwyn C. Cashe distinguished himself by acts of gallantry above and beyond the call of duty while serving as Platoon Sergeant with Company A, 1st Battalion, 15th Infantry Regiment, 3rd Brigade, 3rd Infantry Division in Salah Ad Din Province, Iraq, on October 17th, 2005. While on a nighttime mounted patrol near an enemy-laden village, the Bradley Fighting Vehicle which Sergeant First Class Cashe was commanding was attacked by enemy small-arms fire and an improvised explosive device, which disabled the vehicle and engulfed it in flames. After extracting himself from the vehicle, Sergeant First Class Cashe set about extracting the driver, who was trapped in the vehicle. After opening the driver’s hatch, Sergeant First Class Cashe and a fellow soldier extracted the driver, who was engulfed in the flames. During the course of extinguishing the flames on the driver and extracting him from the vehicle, Sergeant First Class Cashe’s fuel soaked his uniform, igniting and causing severe burns to his body. Ignoring his painful wounds, Sergeant First Class Cashe then moved to the rear of the vehicle to continue in aiding his fellow soldiers who were trapped in the troop compartment. At this time, the enemy noted his movements and began to direct their fire on his position. When another element of the company engaged the enemy, Sergeant First Class Cashe seized the opportunity and moved into the open troop door and aided four of his soldiers in escaping the burning vehicle. Having extracted the four soldiers, Sergeant First Class Cashe noticed two other soldiers had not been accounted for and again he entered the building [sic] to retrieve them. At this time, reinforcements arrived to further suppress the enemy and establish a Casualty Collection Point. Despite the severe second- and third-degree burns covering the majority of his body, Sergeant First Class Cashe persevered through the pain to encourage his fellow soldiers and ensure they received needed medical care. When medical evacuation helicopters began to arrive, Sergeant First Class Cashe selflessly refused evacuation until all of the other wounded soldiers were evacuated first. Sergeant First Class Cashe’s extraordinary heroism and selflessness above and beyond the call of duty were keeping with the highest traditions of the military service and reflect great credit upon himself, his unit, and the United States Army.
Signed
Joseph R. Biden
the President of the United States.

=== Commendations ===
SFC Cashe's awards include:

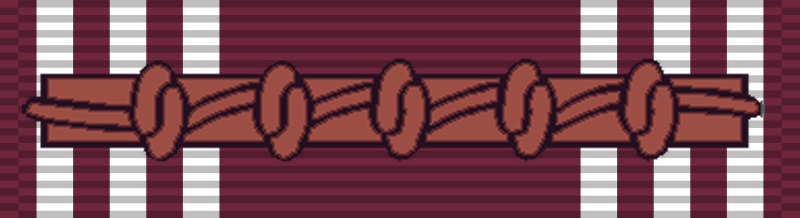
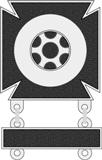
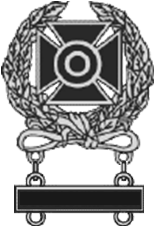

Personal Decorations
| Badge | Combat Infantryman Badge | | | |
| 1st row | Medal of Honor Upgraded from the Silver Star | | Bronze Star | Purple Heart |
| 2nd row | Army Commendation Medal with 1 Oak leaf cluster | Army Achievement Medal with 1 Oak leaf cluster | Army Good Conduct Medal with bronze clasp with 5 loops | National Defense Service Medal with 1 Service star |
| 3rd row | Southwest Asia Service Medal with 3 Campaign stars | Kosovo Campaign Medal with 1 Campaign star | Iraq Campaign Medal 1 Campaign star | Global War on Terrorism Expeditionary Medal |
| 4th row | Global War on Terrorism Service Medal | Armed Forces Service Medal | NCO Professional Development Ribbon with award numeral 3 | Army Service Ribbon |
| 5th row | Army Overseas Service Ribbon with award numeral 2 | NATO Medal for ex-Yugoslavia | Kuwait Liberation Medal (Saudi Arabia) | Kuwait Liberation Medal (Kuwait) |
| Badges | Tracked Vehicle Driver Badge with "Driver-T" component bar | | Parachutist Badge | Expert Marksmanship Badge with "Rifle" component bar |
| Unit citation | Army Presidential Unit Citation | | | |

Other accoutrements
| Expert Infantryman Badge |
| 3rd Infantry Division Combat Service Identification Badge |
| Drill Sergeant Identification Badge |
| 15th Infantry Regiment Distinctive unit insignia |
| 3 Overseas Service Bars |
| 5 Service stripes |

== Honors ==
- In 2022 SFC Alwyn Cashe was posthumously inducted to the 3rd Infantry Division Marne Hall of Fame.
