= Jan Łożański =

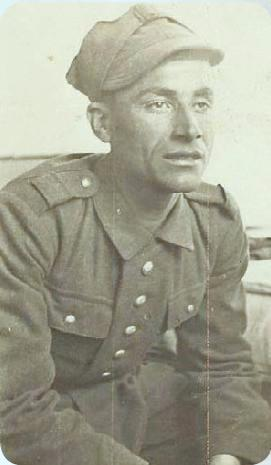
- Jan Łożański
- Born: 4 February 1912; Zarszyn
- Died: 21 June 1990 (aged 78)
- Burial place: Sanok
- Spouse: Władysława Litwin
- Military career
- Allegiance: Polish Home Army
- Rank: Second Lieutenant
- Awards: Virtuti Militari

Jan Łożański, operating under the pseudonyms "Orzeł" and "Jan Madejski" (4 February 1912 – 21 June 1990 in Sanok) was a Second Lieutenant (podporucznik) and a military courier in the Polish Home Army and ZWZ during World War II.

== Life ==
During the Second Polish Republic Jan Łożański was a sportsman (he played football, boxed and trained in athletics ) and a professional soldier.

When the Second World War began, he was a corporal (kapral podchorąży) in the 6th Podhale Rifles Regiment and was stationed in Sambor. After the Invasion of Poland he was taken prisoner by the German forces but managed to escape. He returned to his hometown of Zarszyn in October and in December 1939 fled to Hungary with the intention of joining the Polish troops in France. Upon reaching Budapest he was sent to a civilian refugee camp in Eger. There he accepted a proposition to become a military courier on the Warsaw-Budapest trail and to deliver messages from Hungary to Poland, though at first he intended this service to be temporary as he had not yet abandoned his plans of joining the regular Polish army forming in France. He was sworn in and received his training in Budapest and delivered his first messages in the winter of 1940. At first his trail lead through the Tatra Mountains, then 45 times he traveled through the Low Beskid on the Jaga trail. He carried documents, weapons, money and occasionally guided people. He would take a train from Warsaw into the Podkarpackie Voivodeship and then continue his journey to Budapest on foot using his prior knowledge of the Bieszczady mountains. As a soldier he has traveled the Warsaw-Budapest trail 45 times until he ended his service in 1945. During that time he was arrested six times; twice by the gestapo and four times by Hungarian troops. He has led the Polish general Stanisław Rostworowski through the border. Under his alias "Jan Madejski" he attended a university in Budapest which allowed him to travel freely within the country.

On 19 March 1945 he was captured by the Soviet counter-intelligence agencies. His elderly father was imprisoned and his sister killed by Gestapo.

After the war he continued serving as a military courier, delivering intelligence from Vienna to Poland. At first, the headquarters of the Second Corps in Ancona (Italy) commissioned Łożański to make contact with the "Raclawice" organization in Poland. Later he helped the families of Polish officers escape the country.

He was arrested by the Ministry of Public Security on 17 July 1947 in Cieszyn. On 18 March 1948 he was sentenced to 15 years imprisonment as well as a revoking of his civil rights for 10 years. In autumn he was transported to the infamous Wronki Prison where he was eventually granted amnesty on 4 August 1956.

After regaining his freedom he lived in Sanok with his wife Władysława and daughter Beata.

He repeatedly published his memoirs, among others, in the "Rocznik Sanocki", a book "Kurierskim szlakiem przez Beskid Niski" and the book "W więzieniach PRL". In 2012 a collection of his memoirs were published under the title "Orzeł z Budapesztu" (the eagle of Budapest).

After his death in 1990 he was buried in the "old Matejko" section of the Central Cemetery in Sanok.

== Honours and awards ==
- Silver Cross of the Virtuti Militari Gazeta Sanocka – Autosan. Vol. 26, no. 497. Sanocka Fabryka Autobusów. September 20–30, 1989.
- Cross of Valour
- Armia Krajowa Cross
- Silver Cross of Merit
- Polish Army Medal four times
