= Wanda Janicka =

Polish architect (1923–2023)

Personal details
- Born: 16 June 1923 Warsaw, Second Polish Republic
- Died: 7 September 2023 (aged 100) Droginia, Poland
- Profession: Architect
- Awards: Officer's Cross of the Order of Polonia Restituta, Silver Cross of Merit, Warsaw Insurgent Cross, Partisan Cross, Medal for Warsaw 1939–1945, Commemorative Badge of Operation "Burza", Home Army Cross, Commemorative Badge of the "Radosław" Group
- Nickname: "Zofia"

Military service
- Allegiance: Poland
- Branch/service: Home Army (AK)
- Years of service: 1944–1945 (during WWII)
- Rank: Second Lieutenant
- Unit: Participant in the Warsaw Uprising, 1st company of the Parasol Battalion
- Battles/wars: World War II: Warsaw Uprising

Wanda Janicka (née Nowakowska, alias "Zofia") (16 June 1923 – 7 September 2023) was a Polish architect, participant in the Warsaw Uprising.

== Biography ==
From 1939 she was involved in independence activities. From February 1944, she was in the underground, introduced to it by Stanisław Huskowski. Initially, she was assigned to the Kedyw of the Home Army Command – "Pegaz" company. During the Warsaw Uprising, she served as a runner for the 1st company of the Parasol Battalion of the Radosław Group of the Home Army. She fought in Wola, Old Town, City Centre, and Upper Czerniaków. She was injured in both legs, which forced her to withdraw from further combat. She left Warsaw with the civilian population after the Germans took over the Old Town. She ended up in Dulag 121 Pruszków, from which she managed to escape.

During the occupation, she studied architecture through underground education. She graduated from the Building School in Warsaw. Immediately after the war, she moved to Tricity. There, she married Stanisław Janicki, with whom she had a daughter. The marriage ended in divorce. She worked at the Development Bureau of Kraków. Along with Tadeusz Ptaszycki, she was involved in designing Nowa Huta. Later, she lived in Balice, where she was cared for by Jerzy Miziurek and Katarzyna Marszałek. As of 29 August 2023, she was promoted to the rank of Second lieutenant by President Andrzej Duda.

Daughter of Bogdan and Zofia (née Dydzińska), sister of biologist and Warsaw Uprising insurgent Jakub Nowakowski.

She died at the age of 100 as one of the last soldiers of the Parasol Battalion. She is buried at the Grębałów Cemetery in Kraków.

== Awards ==
- 2022 – Officer's Cross of the Order of Polonia Restituta "for outstanding merits for the independence of the Republic of Poland”
- Silver Cross of Merit
- Warsaw Insurgent Cross
- Partisan Cross
- Medal for Warsaw 1939–1945
- Commemorative Badge of Operation "Burza"
- Home Army Cross
- Commemorative Badge of the "Radosław" Group
