= Polish Army Medal =

Polish Army Medal Medal Wojska Polskiego
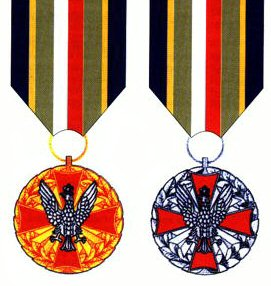
- Polish Army Medal in gold and silver
- Type: Three class medal
- Awarded for: Services to the Polish armed forces in peacekeeping or other international operations, and for promoting Polish military history internationally.
- Country: Poland
- Presented by: Minister of National Defence
- Eligibility: Foreign civilians and military personnel
- Established: 3 September 1999
- Ribbon bar for the gold medal Ribbon bar for the silver medal Ribbon bar for the bronze medal

Precedence
- Next (higher): Medal of the Armed Forces in the Service of the Fatherland
- Equivalent: Medal of Merit for National Defence

The Polish Army Medal (Polish: Medal Wojska Polskiego) was established by Poland on 3 September 1999 to recognise service to the Polish Army by foreign civilians and military personnel. The medal is presented in three grades Gold, Silver, and Bronze by the Polish Minister of National Defence. Most awards are presented to members of allied armed forces, but the medal is also awarded to those who have contributed to promoting the history and traditions of the Polish Armed Forces in the international arena.

== Appearance ==
The medal is either gold, silver, or bronze, depending on the grade, 36 mm in diameter. On the obverse is a red enameled cross pattée with concave arm bases. Between the arms of the cross are stylized rays. Under the arms of the cross is a laurel wreath. Superimposed on the cross is a silver crowned eagle for all grades. The reverse is plain aside for a two line inscription "WOJSKO POLSKIE" (Polish Army). The medal is suspended from a ribbon 38 mm wide. The colors are light brown with blue edges, separated by yellow pinstripes. In the center is a half white and half red stripe. On the ribbon bar a gold vertical bar is worn in the center for the gold medal and a silver vertical bar is worn in the center for the silver medal. The ribbon bar of the bronze medal is unadorned.

== Notable recipients ==
Recipients are listed by their country of allegiance.

=== Bulgaria ===
- Major General Mikhail Popov

=== Denmark ===
- General Peter Bartram

=== France ===
- General Thierry Burkhard
- General Bruno Dary
- General Denis Mercier
- Admiral Bernard Rogel

=== Germany ===
- General Hans-Lothar Domröse

=== Mongolia ===
- Lieutenant General Dovchinsurengiin Ganzorig

=== Poland ===
- Lieutenant Colonel Stanisław Aronson
- Władysław Filar
- Second Lieutenant Jan Łożański
- Stanisław Marusarz
- Halina Najder
- Janina Pohl-Mizerska
- Simcha Rotem
- Tadeusz Różewicz
- Samuel Willenberg

=== Slovakia ===
- Miloš Koterec

=== Sweden ===
- Rear Admiral Anders Grenstad

=== United States ===
- General John R. Allen
- General George W. Casey Jr.
- Major General William Enyart
- General Carter Ham
- Lieutenant General Mark Hertling
- General James Mattis
- Staff Sergeant Michael H. Ollis
- General David Petraeus
