= Michael Ollis =

United States Army Medal of Honor recipient (1988–2013)

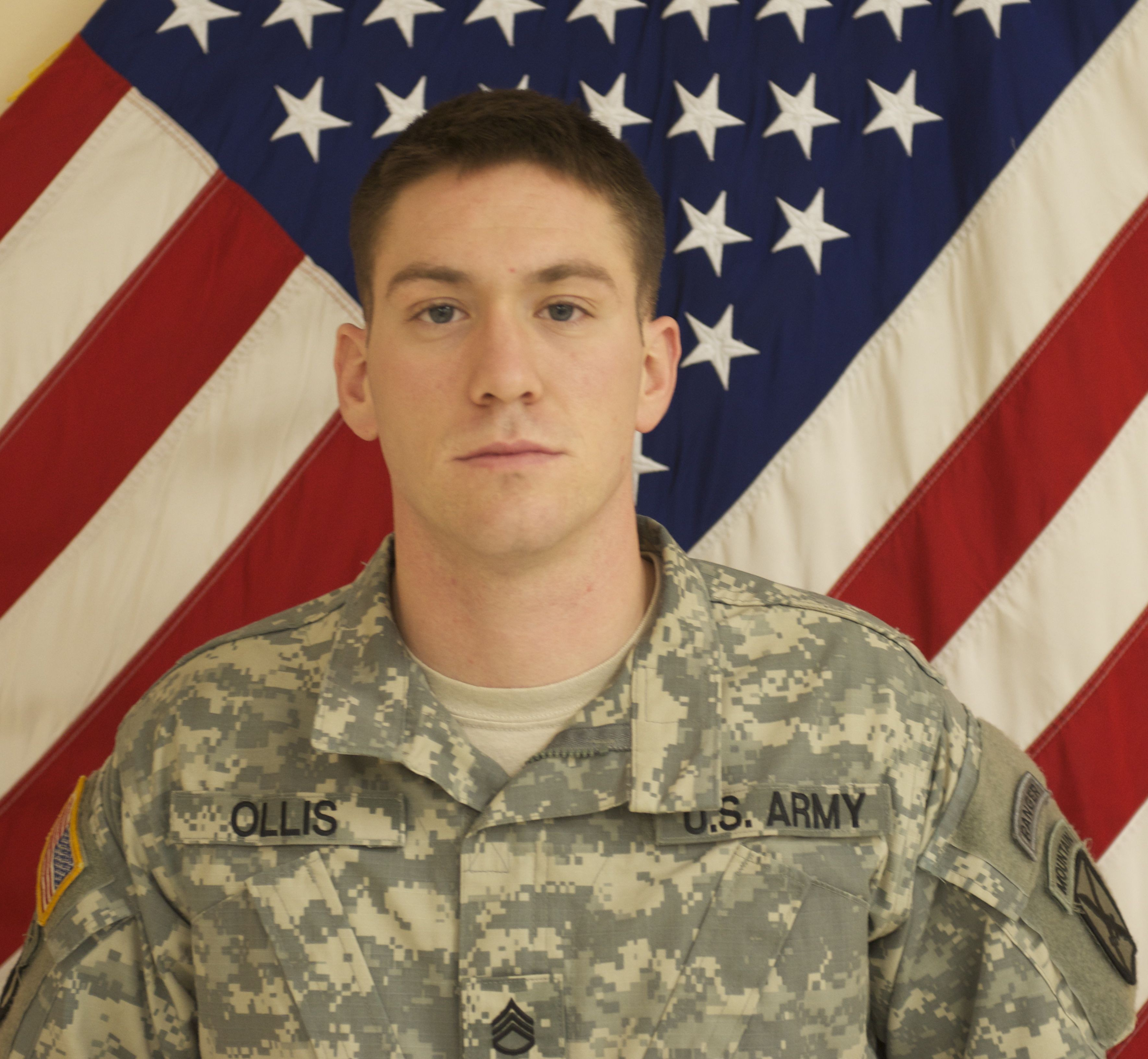
- SSG Michael H. Ollis
- Born: Michael Harold Ollis; September 16, 1988; New Dorp, Staten Island, New York, U.S.
- Died: August 28, 2013 (aged 24); Forward Operating Base Ghazni, Ghazni Province, Afghanistan
- Burial place: Cemetery of the Resurrection, Pleasant Plains, Staten Island, New York, U.S.
- Military career
- Allegiance: United States
- Branch: United States Army
- Service years: 2006–2013
- Rank: Staff sergeant
- Units: Company B, 2nd Battalion, 22nd Infantry Regiment, 1st Brigade Combat Team, 10th Mountain Division
- Conflicts: War in Afghanistan †
- Awards: Medal of Honor; Purple Heart; Bronze Star; Polish Army Gold Medal

Michael Harold Ollis (September 16, 1988 – August 28, 2013) was an American military non-commissioned officer. He was a staff sergeant in the U.S. Army's 10th Mountain Division, awarded the Medal of Honor in 2026 for his actions on August 28, 2013, in Ghazni Province, Afghanistan, protecting a Polish army officer, 2nd Lt. Karol Cierpica, during a suicide bombing. The Medal of Honor was awarded to his parents in a White House ceremony on March 2, 2026, by President Donald Trump.

== Army career ==
Ollis enlisted in the Army at age 17 after graduation from Michael J. Petrides School where he attended Junior Reserve Officers' Training Corps. He attended basic training at Fort Benning in Georgia and his first assignment after training was Baumholder, Germany, with the 1st Armored Division. Ollis was deployed to Iraq in 2008. He was next stationed at Fort Campbell in Kentucky with the 101st Airborne Division where he completed Air Assault School. He was deployed to Kandahar Province in Afghanistan during Operation Dragon Strike. After that deployment, Ollis was transferred to Fort Drum and the 10th Mountain Division. In 2012, he completed both Airborne School and Ranger School. At the time of his death, Ollis was a member of the 2nd Battalion, 22nd Infantry Regiment, 1st Brigade Combat Team, 10th Mountain Division.

=== Medal of Honor action ===
Ollis was killed on August 28, 2013, in Ghazni province, Afghanistan, while protecting 2nd Lt. Karol Cierpica of the Polish Land Forces during a suicide attack. Cierpica was also wounded in the attack. Ollis and his unit were attempting to repel an attack by 10 Taliban insurgents and a car bomber who had breached their base's wall. Ollis and Cierpica engaged the insurgents without any personal protective equipment and armed only with their rifles.

Ollis was originally awarded a Silver Star posthumously for his actions. That award was later upgraded to the Distinguished Service Cross, which was formally presented to his parents in June 2019. Rep. Nicole Malliotakis (R-Staten Island) of New York's 11th congressional district was among many advocates, along with the American Legion and the SSG Michael Ollis Freedom Foundation, for Ollis to be awarded the Medal of Honor.

President Donald Trump approved the Medal of Honor for Ollis on February 3, 2026. The Polish Defense Ministry issued a statement February 5, 2026, stating, "In 2013 in Afghanistan, he gave his life, shielding the body of our Capt. Karol Cierpica during a terrorist attack. This story is a symbol of the unbreakable bond that connects Poland and the United States. Our nations serve shoulder to shoulder, defending shared values, freedom and democracy. The heroism of Sergeant Ollis reminds us that the alliance is not just words."

== Medal of Honor citation ==
Staff Sergeant Michael H. Ollis distinguished himself by acts of gallantry and intrepidity above and beyond the call of duty on 28 August 2013, while serving as an Infantryman with Company B, 2d Battalion, 22d Infantry Regiment, 1st Brigade Combat Team, 10th Mountain Division in Afghanistan. On this date, a complex enemy attack involving multiple vehicle-borne improvised explosive devices, suicide vests, indirect fire and small arms fire was launched against Forward Operating Base Ghazni. Staff Sergeant Ollis ordered his fellow soldiers who were located in a building to move to bunkers to shield themselves from enemy fire. After accounting for his soldiers, he reentered the building to check for any casualties and then moved toward the enemy force that had penetrated the perimeter of the Forward Operating Base. Staff Sergeant Ollis located a Coalition Forces Officer and together they moved toward the point of attack without their personal protection equipment and armed with only their rifles. Upon reaching the attack point he and his comrade linked up with other friendly forces and began a coordinated effort to repulse the enemy from the airfield and adjacent buildings. While under continuous small arms, indirect and rocket propelled grenade fire, Staff Sergeant Ollis and his comrades moved from position to position engaging the enemy with accurate and effective fire. Fighting along the perimeter of the Forward Operating Base, an insurgent came around a corner, whom Staff Sergeant Ollis immediately engaged with three rifle rounds. With complete disregard for his own safety, Staff Sergeant Ollis positioned himself between the insurgent and the Coalition Forces Officer who had been wounded in both legs and was unable to walk. Staff Sergeant Ollis fired on the insurgent and incapacitated him, but as he approached the downed insurgent, the insurgent’s suicide vest detonated and mortally wounded him. Staff Sergeant Ollis’ exceptional courage and complete disregard of personal safety were in keeping with the highest traditions of military service and reflect great credit upon him, his unit, and the United States Army.

== Distinguished Service Cross citation ==
Department of the Army, General Orders No. 2019-32 (October 16, 2019):

The President of the United States of America, authorized by Act of Congress July 9, 1918, takes pride in presenting the Distinguished Service Cross (Posthumously) to Staff Sergeant Michael Harold Ollis, United States Army, for extraordinary heroism while engaged in an action against an enemy of the United States while serving as an Infantryman with Company B, 2d Battalion, 22d Infantry Regiment, 1st Brigade Combat Team, 10th Mountain Division (Light), in combat operation in support of Operation ENDURING FREEDOM on August 28, 2013, in Afghanistan. When a complex enemy attack involving vehicle-borne improvised explosive devices, suicide vests, indirect fire, and small arms fire against Forward Operating Base Ghazni began, Staff Sergeant Ollis ordered his fellow Soldiers who were located in a building to move to bunkers to shield themselves from fire. After accounting for his Soldiers, he reentered the building to check for any casualties and then moved toward the enemy force which had penetrated the perimeter of the forward operating base. Staff Sergeant Ollis located a Coalition Forces Officer and together they moved toward the point of attack without their personal protection equipment and armed only with their rifles. Upon reaching the attack point he and his comrade linked up with other friendly forces and began a coordinated effort to repulse the enemy from the airfield and adjacent buildings. While under continuous small arms, indirect, and rocket propelled grenade fires. Staff Sergeant Ollis and his comrades moved from position to position engaging the enemy with accurate and effective fire. While fighting along the perimeter of the forward operating base, an insurgent came around a corner and immediately engaged them with small arms fire. With complete disregard for his own safety. Staff Sergeant Ollis positioned himself between the insurgent and the Coalition Forces Officer who had been wounded in both legs and was unable to walk. Staff Sergeant Ollis fired on the insurgent and incapacitated him, but as he approached the insurgent, the insurgent’s suicide vest detonated mortally wounding him. Staff Sergeant Ollis’ actions are in keeping with the highest traditions of the military service and reflect great credit upon himself, the 1st Brigade Combat Team, 10th Mountain Division, and the United States Army.

== Awards and decorations ==
Ollis received the Medal of Honor, the Purple Heart, the Bronze Star Medal, the Gold Medal of the Polish Army Medal, and the Grand Cross of the Order of Merit of the Republic of Poland.

| Badge | Combat Infantryman Badge | | |
| 1st row | Medal of Honor Upgraded from DSC, 2026 | | Bronze Star Medal |
| 2nd row | Purple Heart | Army Commendation Medal with 1 Oak leaf cluster | Army Achievement Medal with 1 Oak leaf cluster |
| 3rd row | Army Good Conduct Medal with 2 Good Conduct Loops | National Defense Service Medal | Afghanistan Campaign Medal with 2 Campaign star |
| 4th row | Iraq Campaign Medal with 2 Campaign Star | Global War on Terrorism Service Medal | NCO Professional Development Ribbon |
| 5th row | Army Service Ribbon | Army Overseas Service Ribbon | NATO Medal ISAF |
| Badge | Parachutist Badge | | Air Assault Badge |
| Tab | Ranger Tab | | |
| Unit Awards | Presidential Unit Citation | Joint Meritorious Unit Award | Meritorious Unit Commendation |

=== Patches ===

| 1st Armored Division Insignia | 101st Airborne Division Insignia | 10th Mountain Division Insignia |

=== Foreign awards ===

| Polish Army Medal Gold Medal | Grand Cross of the Order of Merit Poland |

== Other honors ==
Ollis has had several places dedicated to his memory and heroism, including the SSG Michael H. Ollis Weapons Training Center at Fort Drum, New York, home of the 10th Mountain Division. The SSG Michael H. Ollis Warrior Grill at Camp Kościuszko, Poland, was also named for him.

The Staff Sgt. Michael Ollis Junior Training Corps at the Senior Academic High School at the College of Health Sciences in Bydgoszcz, Poland, was named for him.

The Ollis-class ferries of the Staten Island Ferry are named after him, including the MV SSG Michael H. Ollis.

Captain Karol Cierpica, the Polish officer Ollis saved, named his son Michael in honor of Ollis.

In December 2013, The Oakwood Heights VFW Post 9587 was renamed the SSG Michael Ollis VFW Post.

== See also ==
- List of post-Vietnam War Medal of Honor recipients
- U.S. Army SSG Michael H. Ollis Medal of Honor site
