= Stanisław Aronson =

Anti-nazi resistance fighter and IDF officer

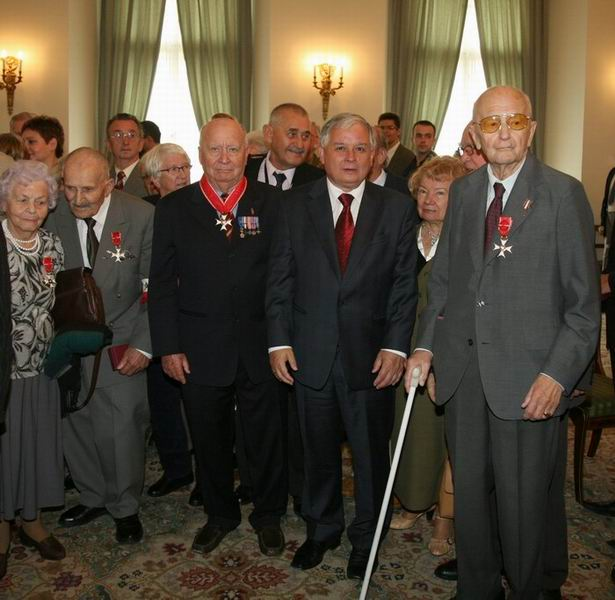
- Stanisław "Rysiek" Aronson (left) (decorated with the Order of Polonia Restituta 3rd Class) and President of Poland Lech Kaczyński
- Born: 6 May 1925 (age 101); Warsaw, Poland
- Military career
- Allegiance: Polish Underground State; Israel
- Branch: Home Army; Israeli Ground Forces
- Service years: 1942-45; 1948-82
- Rank: Podpułkownik (Poland) / Sgan Aluf (Israel)
- Nickname: Rysiek
- Conflicts: Warsaw Uprising; 1947–1949 Palestine war Yom Kippur War; 1982 Lebanon War
- Awards: Krzyż Komandorski z Gwiazdą Orderu Odrodzenia Polski Krzyż Komandorski Orderu Odrodzenia Polski Krzyż Oficerski Orderu Zasługi RP Krzyż Walecznych (dwukrotnie) Krzyz Armii Krajowej Warszawski Krzyż Powstańczy Medal Wojska (dwukrotnie) Złoty Medal Wojska Polskiego Medal Honorowy za zasługi dla ŻW Medal za Wojnę o Niepodległość (Izrael) Medal za Wojnę Jom Kippur (Izrael) Medal za Wojnę Libańską (Izrael)

Stanisław Witold Aronson (nom de guerre "Rysiek"; Hebrew: סטניסלב אהרונסון; born 6 May 1925) is a Polish Jew and an Israeli citizen, as well as a former officer of the Polish Home Army (AK) with a rank of lieutenant colonel. He was also a member of the Kedyw unit, "Kolegium A", of the Warsaw Region of AK, a participant in the Warsaw Uprising of 1944, and a lieutenant colonel of the Israeli Defense Force who took part in the 1947–1949 Palestine war, the Yom Kippur War and the 1982 Lebanon War.

== Biography ==
Aronson was born on 6 May 1925. Aronson's mother family came from Łódź. After the German invasion of Poland in 1939, they first moved from Łódź to Warsaw. After a few days, they decided to move further east to the Kresy, where near Równo their relatives owned some land. However, in the meantime the Soviet Union also invaded Poland as part of the Molotov–Ribbentrop Treaty between the Soviet Union and Nazi Germany, and the relatives were arrested by the NKVD and deported eastwards, deep within the Soviet Union. As a result, the family tried to unsuccessfully enter Lithuania, and then into Romania. Eventually they wound up in Soviet-occupied Lwow. According to Aronson, in Lwow, the Soviets pressured Poles, Ukrainians and Jews to sign up for the Komsomol but he personally refused.

After Operation Barbarossa, the German invasion of the Soviet Union began and German troops entered Lwow. This resulted in a series of pogroms by Ukrainian nationalists and German Einsatzgruppen, and the Germans began transporting Jews out of the city. Despite the fact that the Aronson family had documents that listed them as Poles, they were forced to flee again. In the autumn of 1941 they arrived in the Warsaw Ghetto which in their view was a better place than the Nazi concentration camps to which other Jews from Lwow were sent.

During the liquidation of the Warsaw Ghetto the whole family ended up on Umschlagplatz where they got separated. Stanisław never saw his family again. He himself was put on a transport to Auschwitz but managed to escape while the train was parked in the countryside near Warsaw. He spent the night hiding in a nearby chapel and then made his way to a nearby village. A local farmer gave him shelter, food and transportation to the nearby rail station. Aronson went back to Warsaw, where he made contact with Polish friends that lived on the "Aryan" side.

They organized a hiding place for him and later, false documents in the name of "Ryszard Żurawski" (later Żukowski), which was the origin of his nom-de-guerre “Rysiek”. Soon he was contacted by the Polish Home Army and asked to join the anti-Nazi resistance. He was member of selected Kedyw group which, under the command of Józef Rybicki, carried out executions of Nazi collaborators and traitors sentenced by Underground courts.

== Warsaw Uprising and aftermath ==
He also took part in the Warsaw Uprising of 1944. His unit fought in the Wola district as part of the elite Radosław Group, in Battalion Zośka. The unit attacked German barracks at the site of Umschlagplatz from where Jews from the Warsaw Ghetto, including Stanislaw's family, had been sent to death camps. His battalion liberated about fifty Jews, mostly from Greece, still present at the site. After the insurgents were pushed out by the Germans into Warsaw Old Town he was wounded and ended up in a field hospital on Długa street, which was under constant bombardment by the Germans.

After the fall of the uprising he was sent along with the city's civilians to Durchgangslager 121 Pruszków (temporary concentration camp for POWs or expellees). Together with a companion he managed to escape from the camp and hid out at the house of a family friend near Kraków. After his wounds healed, he went back to Łódź and rejoined the Home Army, and later the anti-communist resistance organization NIE. After Red Army entered Poland, Aronson was arrested by the communist secret security services, UB, but again escaped.

He clandestinely left Poland, first finding his way to the Western Allies Occupation zone in Austria, then to Italy. In Ancona he joined the II Corps of General Wladyslaw Anders, part of the Polish Armed Forces in the West. He began studying medicine when he was contacted by an uncle who lived in Tel Aviv who convinced him to emigrate to Palestine. Aronson finished his military service with the Polish corps in 1947 and moved to Jerusalem.

== In Israel ==
In Jerusalem he resumed the study of medicine, but when the 1947–1949 Palestine war broke out he joined the nascent Israeli Army. He was demobilized in 1950 with the rank of captain. He took part in later conflicts and rose to the rank of lieutenant colonel.

Aronson did not get to visit Poland until 1988. He published his memoirs, and on his initiative a commemorative plaque was added to the site of the former Umschlagplatz commemorating the participation of Jewish fighters in the Warsaw Uprising of 1944.

== Military decorations ==
- Commander of the Order of Polonia Restituta with Star (2013)
- Commander of the Order of Polonia Restituta (2007)
- Officer of the Order of Merit of the Republic of Poland (1997)
- Cross of Valour (Poland) – two times
- Armia Krajowa Cross
- Warsaw Cross of the Uprising
- Army Medal for War 1939-45 (Poland) – two times
- Gold Polish Army Medal
- Decoration of Honor – "Medal of Honor for Merit to the Military Gendarmerie" (2014)
- Medal for the 1948 Arab–Israeli War (Israel)
- Medal for the Yom Kippur War (Israel)
- Medal for the 1982 Lebanon War (Israel)

== Bibliography ==
- Stanisław Aronson, Patrycja Bukalska, Rysiek z Kedywu. Niezwykłe losy Stanisława Aronsona, Znak, Kraków 2009 ISBN 978-83-240-1170-4
