= Zdzisław Najder =

Polish professor of literature, historian and political advisor (1930–2021)

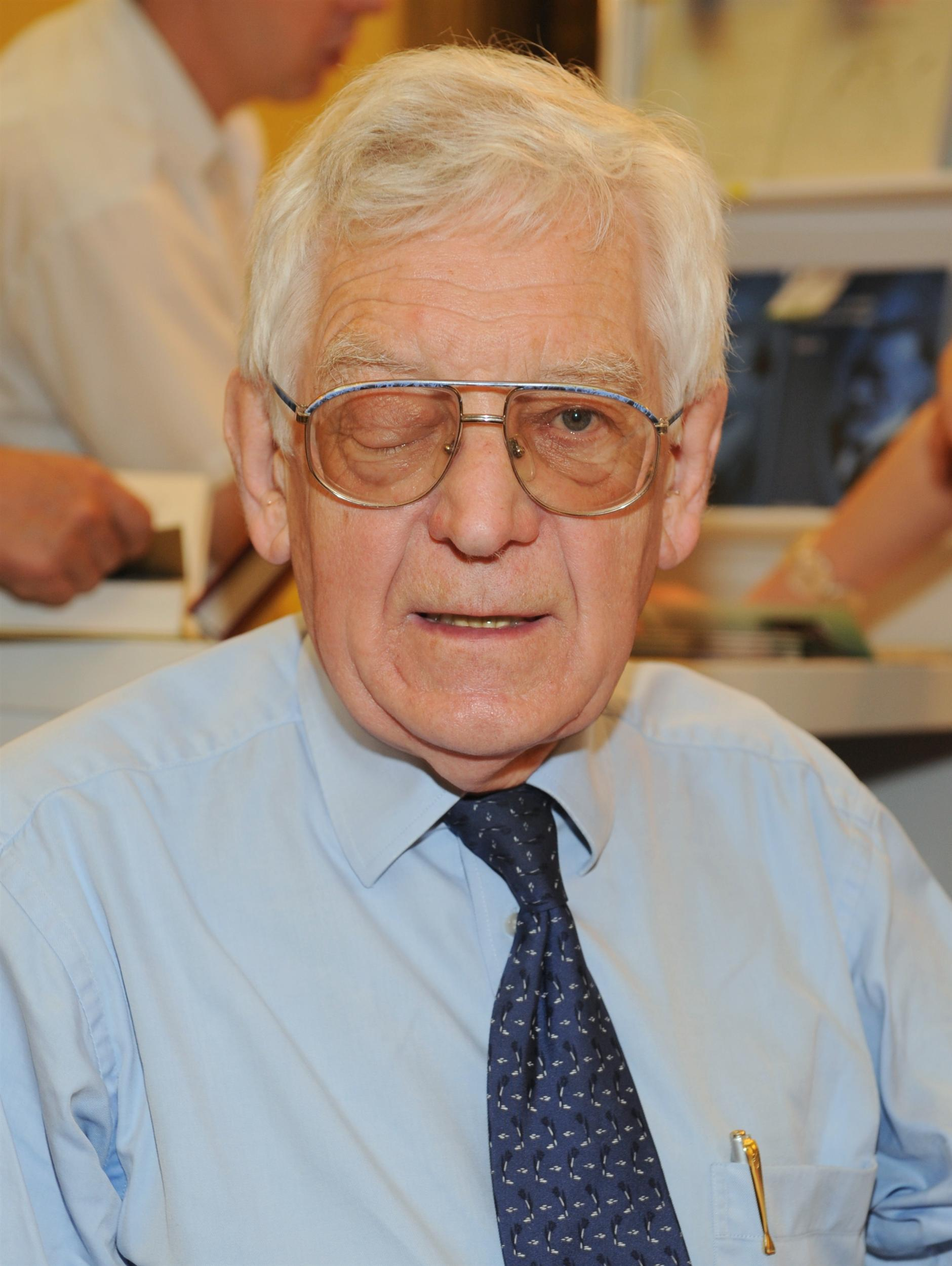
Zdzisław Najder

Zdzisław Najder (Polish pronunciation: [ˈʑd͡ʑiswaf ˈnajdɛr]; 31 October 1930 – 15 February 2021) was a Polish literary historian, critic, and political activist.

He was primarily known for his studies on Joseph Conrad, for his periods of service as political adviser to Lech Wałęsa and Jan Olszewski, and for having served as chief of the Polish-language section of Radio Free Europe.

Educated in Poland and England, Najder had worked as a professor in Poland and abroad before his exile from Poland in 1981. During most of that exile, he worked for Radio Free Europe. Sentenced to death in absentia in his native land, he did not return to Poland until the overthrow of its communist regime, whereupon he became an active political adviser.

Najder's 1983 biography of Conrad, substantially revised in 2007, is regarded as a definitive work in Conrad scholarship. He was married to the Polish-British literary translator, Halina Carroll-Najder.

== Life ==
=== Early life ===
Born in Warsaw, Poland, on 31 October 1930, Najder studied at Warsaw University (1949–1954) and at St Antony's College, Oxford (1959–1969), earning doctoral degrees in philosophy and Polish literature. He added a second doctoral degree in Polish literature in Poland in 1978.

Najder taught at Warsaw University as a professor of literature, co-edited the Polish monthly literary journal Twórczość (Creation), and was a member of the Polish Academy of Sciences' Institute for Literary Studies.

=== Exile ===
When martial law was declared in Poland on 13 December 1981, Najder was a visiting scholar at Oxford University. Choosing not to return to his native land, he took a position in Germany with Radio Free Europe (RFE), becoming chief of its Polish-language section in April 1982. In response, the Polish government under the leadership of Wojciech Jaruzelski condemned him to death in absentia, accusing Najder of spying for United States intelligence services. Two years later, he was stripped of his Polish citizenship.

The first citizen of the Eastern Bloc recruited for such an RFE role, Najder influenced RFE to more sharply criticize Poland's communist regime, and launched a program that envisioned the country without communism: "The Poland that Could Be". Najder remained with RFE until 1987.

=== Conrad scholarship ===
Najder's interest in Polish-born author Joseph Conrad long predates his exile; in 1998, Barry Langford for Times Higher Education (THE) described it as "four decades of biographical and critical research". In 1983, Najder published a definitive biography of Conrad, Joseph Conrad: A Chronicle (Smithmark), which drew comparisons of the two by literary critic Edward Said: "Exile, the strong affinity with French and British culture, the sense of Poland as a place lost to Russian power, the remorseless effort to keep working and writing in environments less than perfect – these things bind Mr. Najder to Conrad…." Said went on to laud the book, asserting that "It is correct, I think, to say that what we get in it is the first, almost rigidly antinomian portrait we have had of him, with the discrepancies and contradictions of fact, character and esthetic laid out starkly, the impossibilities of situation left unadorned, the inexplicable vagaries of career and temperament encouraged to speak for themselves more powerfully than ever before." The book became, according to Richard Hand in THE, "instantly a key work in Conrad studies", while Najder himself earned renown as a pre-eminent Conrad scholar.

In addition to other publications on Conrad, in 2007 Najder rewrote Joseph Conrad: A Chronicle, issued as Joseph Conrad: A Life (Camden House). The rewrite included substantial new content reflecting Najder's continued research into Conrad's biography.

=== Repatriation ===
In 1989 Poland's communist government was voted out of power, and the Solidarity trade union's Tadeusz Mazowiecki was appointed Prime Minister. Najder's conviction for treason and espionage was overturned. Najder returned to his homeland, serving as a key adviser to Lech Wałęsa during his presidency (1990–95) and a senior adviser to Jan Olszewski during his term as prime minister (1991–92).

In 1992 he became central to a controversy in Poland when Jerzy Urban published in the left-wing Polish weekly tabloid magazine NIE a document purportedly written by Najder in 1958, stating that he would cooperate with the Communist secret police. Urban was accused and convicted of violating Poland's state secrets act. Najder denied ever having worked with the police, though he admitted that they had contacted him. Because Poland never experienced a full lustration process as did Germany, for instance, it is often the case that persons accused of having cooperated with the secret police (a paid, voluntary activity) deny it. However, in 2005 it was finally revealed that Najder had indeed worked for the secret police, under the code name "Zapalniczka" (Polish for "[cigarette] lighter").

In addition to his political activities in Poland, Najder also returned to Polish academia, taking a University of Opole position as a professor of English literature. In 2009 Najder was awarded by the Committee for French-German-Polish Cooperation (Weimar Triangle) - together with Ambassador Stéphane Hessel (France) and Countess Freya von Moltke (Germany) - with the Adam Mickiewicz Prize for merits in the French-German-Polish reconciliation. Laudatio: Professor Rita Suessmuth, former President of the German Bundestag.

== Select bibliography ==
- Najder, Zdzisław (1983). Joseph Conrad: A Chronicle. Smithmark Pub. ISBN 9780813509440.
- Najder, Zdzisław; Halina Carroll-Najder (1983). Conrad under Familial Eyes: Texts. Cambridge University Press. ISBN 978-0-521-25082-5.
- Najder, Zdzisław (1997). Conrad in Perspective: Essays on Art and Fidelity. Cambridge University Press. ISBN 978-0-521-57321-4.
- Najder, Zdzisław (2007). Joseph Conrad: A Life. Camden House. ISBN 978-1-57113-347-2.
