= Mikhail Popov (general) =

Bulgarian military leader

Major General Mikhail Dmitrov Popov (Bulgarian: Михаил Димитров Попов; born 23 December 1963) is a Bulgarian Major general and military leader who was the Commander of the Bulgarian Land Forces from 2017 to 2022.

== Early life and career ==
He was born in Sliven, in the south-eastern part of the Bulgarian People's Republic on 23 December 1963. He graduated from Dobri Chintulov High School in 1981 from which he joined the Bulgarian People's Army (BNA) shortly thereafter. In the 4 years that followed, he studied at the Vasil Levski Military All-Army University in Veliko Tarnovo specializing in Intelligence assessment before graduating in 1985. After graduating, he immediately became the commander of an intelligence platoon, a position he held for one year before serving in an intelligence company until 1988. 3 years after the fall of communism in Bulgaria, he joined the newly established Bulgarian Armed Forces where he first served as a cadet in the Georgi Rakovski Military Academy.

== Deployments and command positions ==
He continued his intelligence career in the armed forces, serving as a commander of a reconnaissance battalion before commanding an infantry battalion in Iraq in 2004. From 2005 to 2006, he studied at the United States Army War College in Carlisle, Pennsylvania. Popov would later become the head of a Bulgarian contingent in Tampa, Florida in 2011. Popov had been the leader of many brigades including the 68th Special Forces brigade before being appointed as deputy commander of the Land Forces in 2015. He would serve in this position until becoming the commander of the Bulgarian Land Forces in April 2017 by order of President Rumen Radev. He was dismissed on 10 December 2022.

== Awards ==
He was awarded the Polish Army Bronze Medal by Polish Minister of Defense Jerzy Szmajdziński in 2004, as well as a personal weapon by the Bulgarian Minister of Defense Nikolay Svinarov.
