= Forward Operating Base Ghazni =

Forward army base in Ghazni, Afghanistan

FOB Ghazni
- Ghazni, Ghazni Province in Afghanistan
- Forward Operating Base, Ghazni in 2013

Site information
- Type: Forward operating base
- Owner: International Security Assistance Force (ISAF)
- Operator: United States Armed Forces; Afghan National Police; Polish Army

Location
- Shown within Afghanistan
- Coordinates: 33°33′59″N 68°27′53″E

Site history
- Built: 2004
- In use: 2005-2014
- Fate: Handed over to ANP

Airfield information
Helipads
Number	Length and surface
01	30m x 30m Asphalt
02	30m x 30m Asphalt
03	30m x 30m Asphalt
04	30m x 30m Asphalt
05	30m x 30m Asphalt
06	30m x 30m Asphalt
- 8 Helipads; Reduced in Size by the 858th Horizontal Company MS ARNG

Forward Operating Base (FOB) Ghazni was a forward operating base operated by the International Security Assistance Force (ISAF) located in Ghazni Province, Afghanistan. The base housed members of the United States Armed Forces, Polish Armed Forces and the Afghan National Police.

Deployed units

- Task Force White Eagle (2008-2014)

== See also ==
- List of NATO installations in Afghanistan
- List of Afghan Armed Forces installations
