= Warsaw Uprising Cross =

Warsaw Uprising Cross Warszawski Krzyż Powstańczy
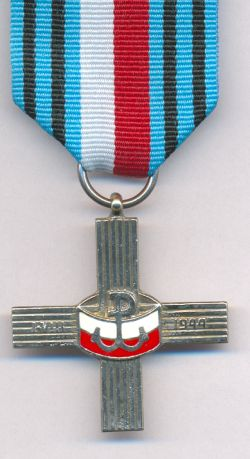
- Warsaw Uprising Cross
- Awarded for: Participation in the Warsaw Uprising
- Country: Poland
- Presented by: Polish Council of State; President of Poland
- Established: 3 July 1981
- Ribbon bar of the cross

The Warsaw Uprising Cross (Polish: Warszawski Krzyż Powstańczy) was a Polish military decoration. It was established by law on 3 July 1981 in order to honor the participants of the Warsaw Uprising of 1944. It was discontinued in 1999. It is distinct from Cross of the Warsaw Uprising, which was an informal award instituted during the Uprising itself.

The decoration was awarded to persons who took an active part in the Warsaw Uprising. In particular:

- Soldiers of all the formations that fought in the Uprising.
- Members of the Military Women's Service, of the Health Care services of the Uprising and other auxiliary insurrectionist services.
- Other persons who were somehow directly involved in the uprising.

The cross was awarded to Polish citizens as well as persons who, although they held non-Polish citizenship at the time, also fought on the Polish side in the Uprising. The Cross could also have been awarded to foreigners if they took part in the Uprising or contributed to the fighting in some major way. The Cross could have been awarded post posthumously. Usually the awards were made on the anniversary of the uprising or on Victory Day (9 May) (anniversary of Nazi capitulation).

Until 1989 the Cross was awarded by the Polish Council of State and later by the President of Poland, on the recommendation of:

- The Minister of Defense – in regard to persons who actively participated in the Uprising, whether through armed struggle or in civilian support.
- The Minister of Foreign Affairs – in regard to persons of Polish citizenship who were living abroad.
- The Veterans associations – in regard to other eligible persons.

The first Warsaw Uprising Crosses were awarded on 1 August 1981 to 100 former soldiers of the Uprising, among others Gen. Jan Mazurkiewicz (Radosław) -–commander of the Home Army, Gen. Franciszek Kamiński – commander of the Bataliony Chłopskie, Col. Maria Wittek - commander of Military Women's Service, as well as Mieczysław Fogg and Lesław Bartelski.

On 16 October 1992, a law was passed which ended the awarding of the medal on 8 May 1999.

== Recipients ==
- Alicja Abczyńska
- Anna Jakubowska
- Stanisław Aronson
- Halina Chmielewska
- Henryk Chmielewski (comics)
- Wanda Janicka
- Jan Mazurkiewicz
- Witold Pilecki
- Danuta Przeworska-Rolewicz
- Ludomił Rayski
- Zbigniew Ścibor-Rylski
- Teresa Suchecka-Nowak
- Maciej Matthew Szymanski
- Samuel Willenberg
- Maria Wittek
- Jerzy Broszkiewicz (lieutenant colonel)
