= 21st Special Tactics Squadron =

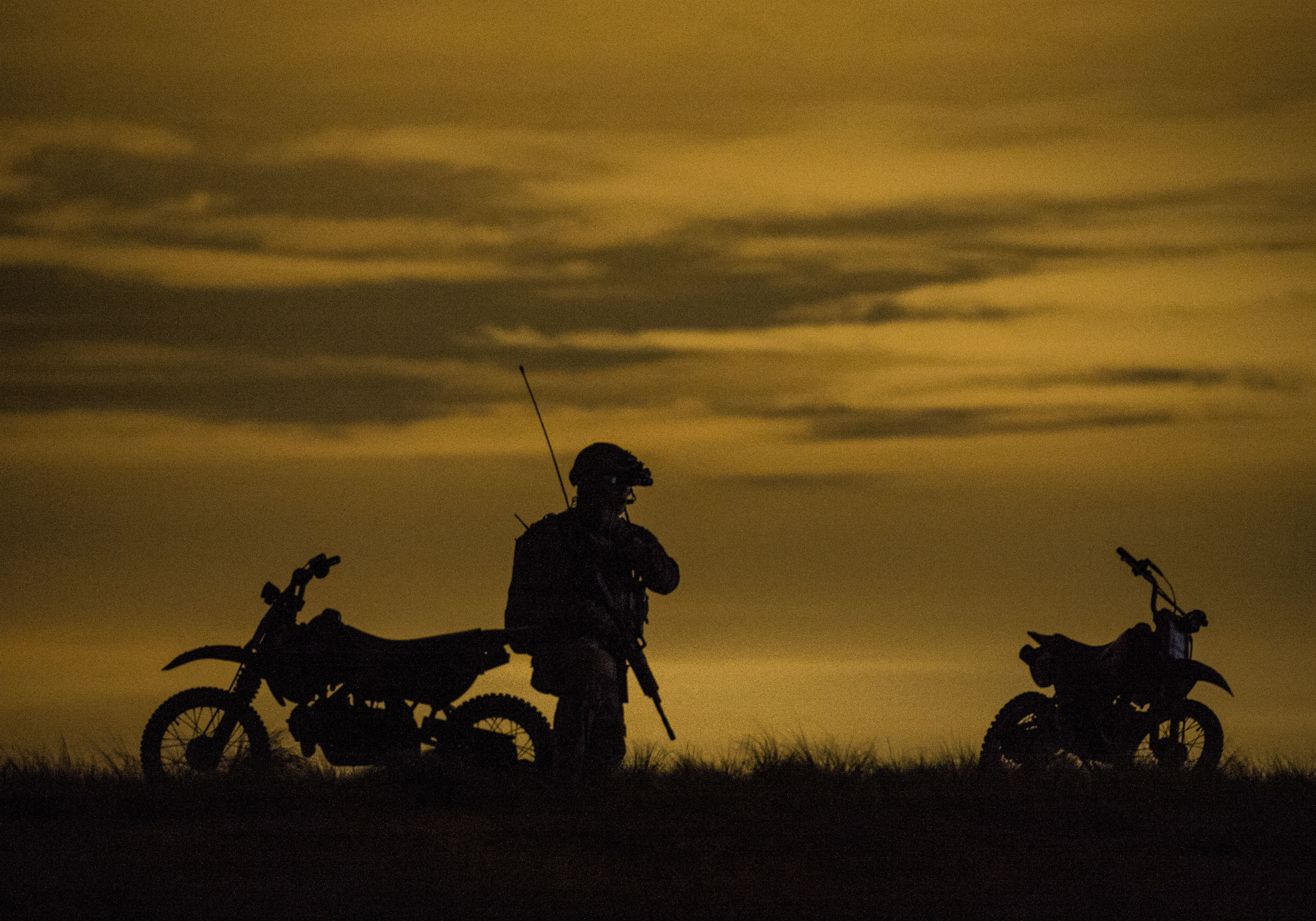
- A squadron combat controller supporting a cargo and personnel airdrop during an exercise
- Active: 1984–1993; 1996–present
- Country: United States
- Branch: United States Air Force
- Role: Special Operations
- Part of: Air Force Special Operations Command; United States Special Operations Command
- Garrison/HQ: Pope Field
- Motto: First There (1988-1993)
- Engagements: Persian Gulf War; War in Afghanistan; Iraq War
- Decorations: Air Force Outstanding Unit Award with Combat "V" Device; Gallant Unit Citation; Air Force Meritorious Unit Award; Air Force Outstanding Unit Award

Commanders
- Current commander: Lt. Col. Jeffrey T. Falcon

Insignia
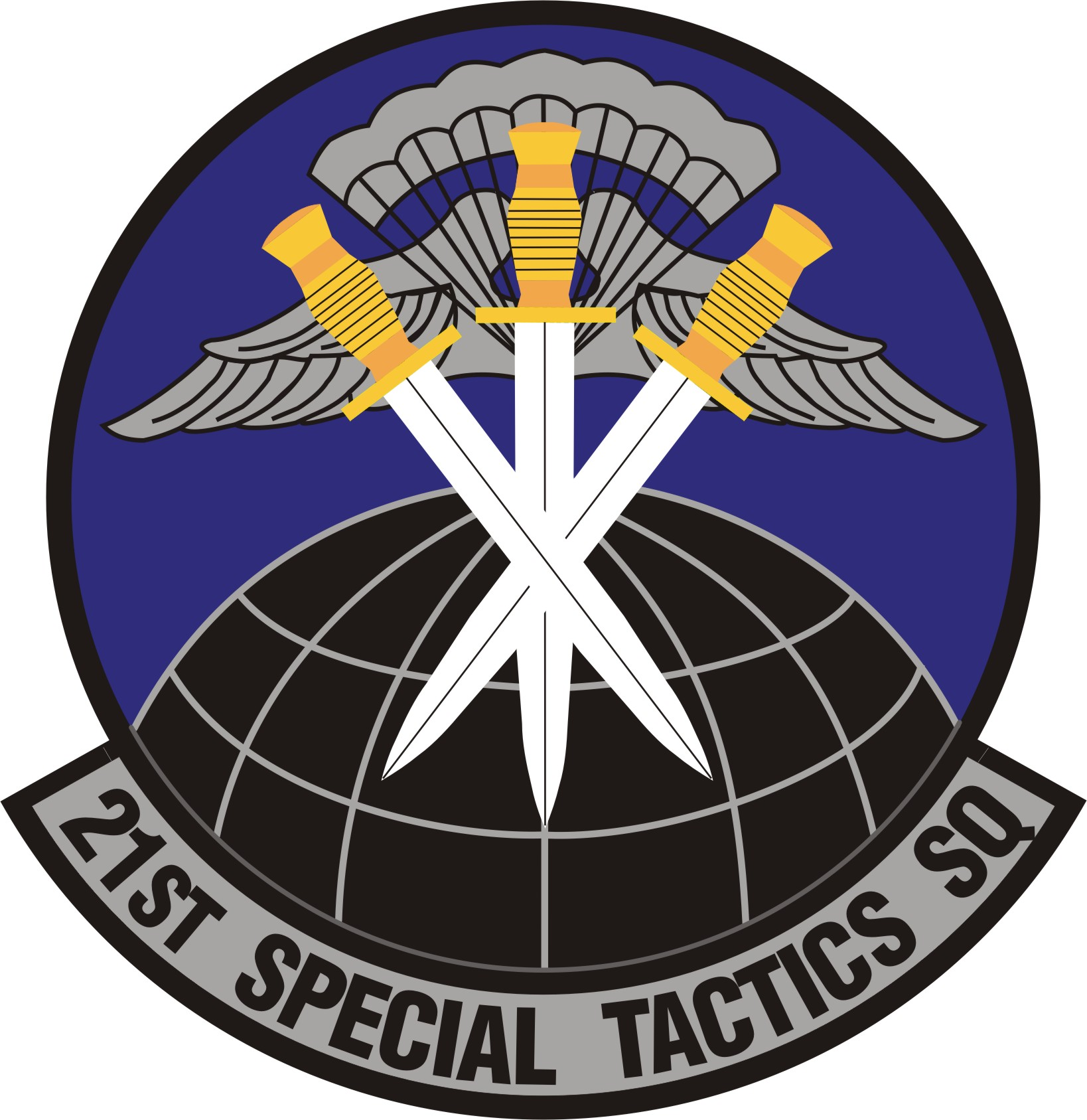
- 21st Special Tactics Squadron emblem (approved 18 March 1999)

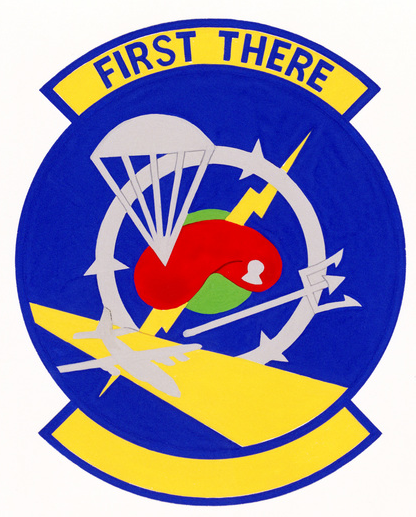
- 1721st Combat Control Squadron emblem (approved c. April 1988)

The 21st Special Tactics Squadron is one of the special tactics units of the United States Air Force Special Operations Command. It is garrisoned at Pope Field, North Carolina.

== Mission ==
Special Tactics Squadrons are organized, trained and equipped specifically for various special operations missions facilitating air operations on the battlefield. They conduct combat search and rescue missions, collect intelligence, as well as call in close air support or airstrikes against enemy combatants and are often partnered with other U.S. special operations forces overseas.

== Lineage ==
- Designated as the 1721st Combat Control Squadron and activated on 1 July 1984

Redesignated 624th Combat Control Squadron on 1 June 1992
Inactivated 1 October 1993

- Redesignated 21st Special Tactics Squadron on 1 May 1996 and activated

=== Assignments ===
- Twenty-First Air Force, 1 July 1984
- 1725th Combat Control Group, 1 March 1991
- 624th Airlift Support Group, 1 June 1992 – 1 October 1993
- 720th Special Tactics Group, 1 May 1996 – present

=== Stations ===
- Pope Air Force Base, North Carolina, 1 July 1984 – 1 October 1993
- Pope Air Force Base (later Pope Field), 1 May 1996 – present

=== Awards and campaigns ===
| Award streamer | Award | Dates | Notes |
|---|---|---|---|
| | Air Force Outstanding Unit Award with Combat "V" Device | 20 December 1989 - 9 January 1990 | 1721st Combat Control Squadron |
| | Air Force Outstanding Unit Award with Combat "V" Device | 1 September 2001 - 31 August 2003 | 21st Special Tactics Squadron |
| | Gallant Unit Citation | 1 January 2006 - 31 December 2007 | 21st Special Tactics Squadron |
| | Air Force Meritorious Unit Award | 1 July 2006 – 31 May 2008 | 21st Special Tactics Squadron |
| | Air Force Outstanding Unit Award | 1 July 1985 - 30 June 1987 | 1721st Combat Control Squadron |
| | Air Force Outstanding Unit Award | 1 August 1995 - 31 July 1997 | 21st Special Tactics Squadron |
| | Air Force Outstanding Unit Award | 1 August 1997 - 31 July 1999 | 21st Special Tactics Squadron |
| | Air Force Outstanding Unit Award | 1 October 2012 - 30 September 2014 | 21st Special Tactics Squadron |

| Campaign Streamer | Campaign | Dates | Notes |
|---|---|---|---|
| | Defense of Saudi Arabia | 2 August 1990 – 16 January 1991 | 1721st Combat Control Squadron |
| | Liberation and Defense of Kuwait | 17 January 1991 – 11 April 1991 | 1721st Combat Control Squadron |
| | Consolidation II | 1 November 2006 – 30 November 2006 | 21st Special Tactics Squadron |
| | Consolidation III | 1 December 2006 – 30 June 2011 | 21st Special Tactics Squadron |
| | Iraqi Sovereignty | 1 January 2009 – 31 August 2010 | 21st Special Tactics Squadron |
| | New Dawn | 1 September 2010 – 31 December 2011 | 21st Special Tactics Squadron |

== Notable members ==
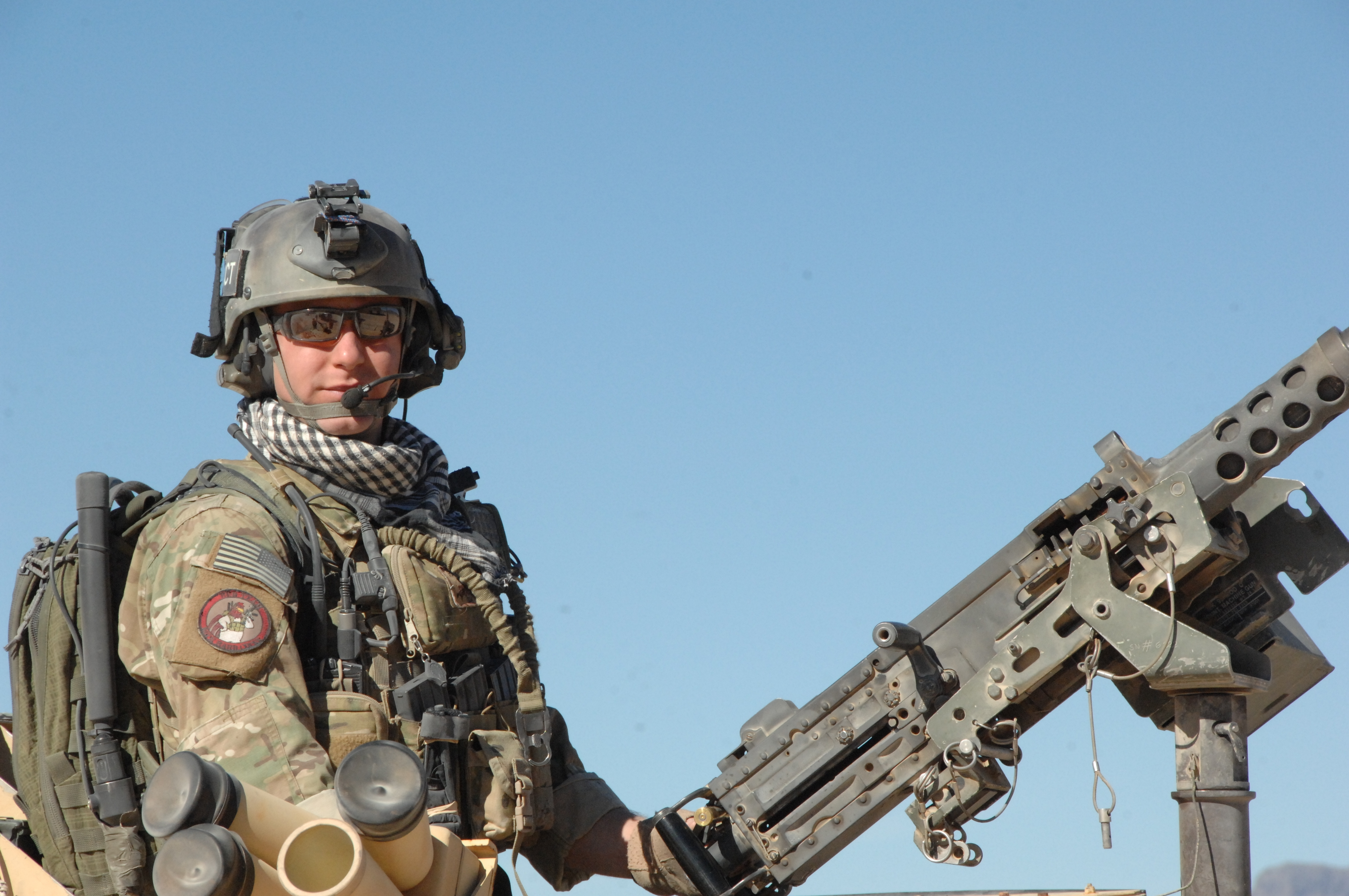
Rhyner on patrol with an Army Special Forces team in Afghanistan.

- Senior Airman Zachary Rhyner, a Combat Controller, was the first living recipient of the Air Force Cross during the War in Afghanistan. He was awarded the Air Force Cross for his actions during the Battle of Shok Valley on 6 April 2008 in Nuristan Province, Afghanistan. According to the citation, during the battle he directed Close air support and Airstrikes totalling 4,570 cannon rounds, nine Hellfire missiles, 162 rockets, a dozen 500-pound bombs and one 2,000-pound bomb. As a result of the same battle ten U.S. Army soldiers, nine Special Forces and one Combat Cameraman, received the Silver Star.
- 20 September 2011 21st Special Tactics Squadron Combat Controller Staff Sgt. Robert Gutierrez received the Air Force Cross for extraordinary heroism. On 5 October 2009 Gutierrez was embedded in a joint US/Afghan National Army Special Forces 30 man unit as the only qualified joint terminal attack controller on a mission in Afghanistan when the unit came under intense enemy fire. Despite being shot, Gutierrez called in three danger close air strikes on the enemy.
- Senior Airman Dustin Temple, a Combat Controller, received the Air Force Cross for his actions during a 48-hour battle 27–29 September 2014 against Taliban forces in the Kajaki district of Helmand province. He was attached to U.S. Army Special Forces team from the 7th Special Forces Group with two other 21st STS members and accompanied by Afghan commandos. Temple called in dozens of airstrikes from various aircraft, among them, F-16s, AH-1s, AC-130s and an MQ-1. Over the course of the battle he controlled 28 helicopters and 20 fixed wing aircraft in a total of 26 engagements. After 45 hours of fighting a resupply helicopter dropped critically needed ammunition to the U.S. and Afghan forces. Temple and two other teammates braved enemy fire across open terrain multiple times to recover the ammunition. The Army team-leader Captain Evan Lacenski carried a critically wounded Green Beret over 300 meters in open terrain to the MEDEVAC helicopter. He was credited with saving 80 lives as a result of his actions. Along with Temple receiving the Air Force Cross, the other two 21 STS members received the Silver Star for their actions during the battle.
