= Zachary Rhyner =

United States Air Force airman

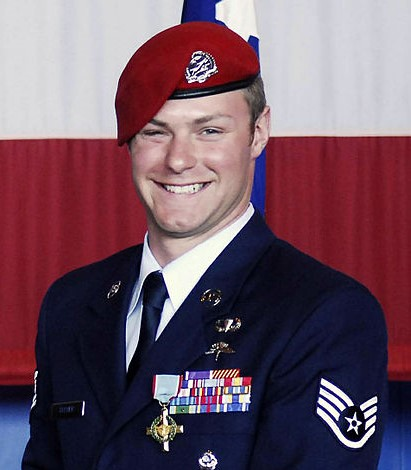
- Rhyner receiving the Air Force Cross, 2009
- Born: June 21, 1986 (age 40); Medford, Wisconsin
- Spouse: Jillian Rhyner
- Children: 2
- Military career
- Allegiance: United States
- Branch: United States Air Force
- Service years: 2004–2015
- Rank: Master Sergeant
- Unit: 21st Special Tactics Squadron
- Conflicts: War in Afghanistan; Battle of Shok Valley; Iraq War; Operation Unified Response
- Awards: Air Force Cross; Purple Heart (3)

Zachary James Rhyner (born June 21, 1986) is a medically retired Combat Controller (CCT) in the United States Air Force who received the Air Force Cross for his actions in the Battle of Shok Valley on 6 April 2008 in Nuristan Province, Afghanistan. He was the first living, and second ever, Combat Controller to receive the Air Force Cross after Technical Sergeant John A. Chapman was posthumously awarded the medal in 2002 for his actions during the Battle of Takur Ghar. Rhyner has deployed six times, including to Iraq and Afghanistan. He has assisted in humanitarian operations and was a part of Operation Unified Response in Haiti during the aftermath of the 2010 Haiti earthquake. He was assigned to the 21st Special Tactics Squadron during his career, and is also a recipient of three Purple Hearts.

== Military career ==
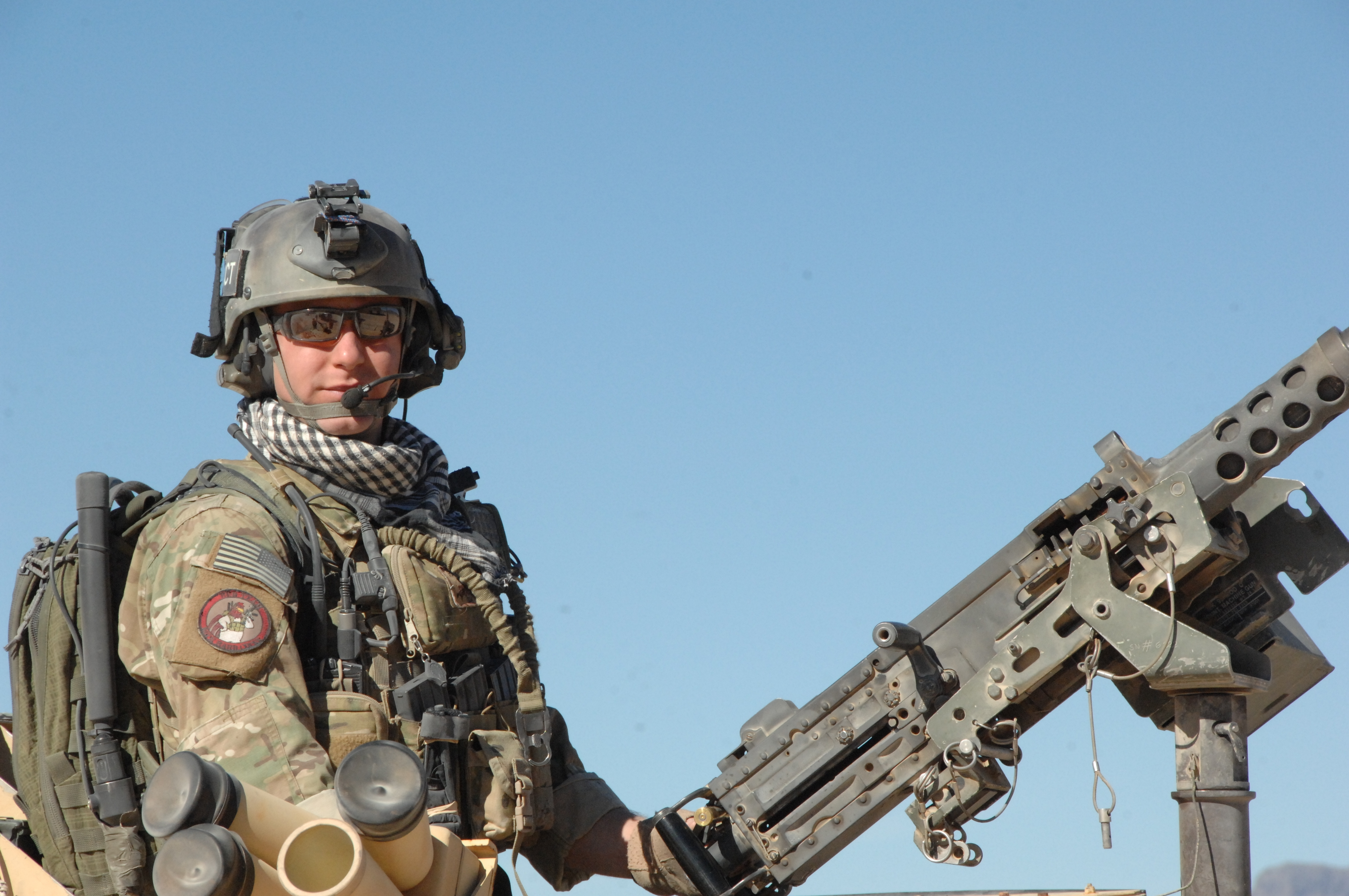
Staff Sergeant Zachary Rhyner on patrol with an Army Special Forces team in Afghanistan, 2008.

Rhyner enlisted in the U.S. Air Force on 31 May 2004. He completed Basic Military Training as an Honor Graduate at Lackland AFB, Texas, in August 2004. A1C Rhyner then went through the Combat Control training "pipeline" which lasted from August 2004 until 2007. The Combat Control training pipeline consisted of the Combat Control Orientation Course at Lackland AFB, the Combat Control Operator course at Keesler AFB, Mississippi, then U.S. Army Airborne School at Fort Benning, Georgia. Afterwards he travelled to Fairchild AFB, Washington, for the U.S. Air Force Basic Survival School. Next he went to the Combat Control School at Pope AFB, North Carolina, where he would be later stationed. He next attended Special Tactics Advanced Skills Training at Hurlburt Field, Florida, for upwards of a year. While in AST Rhyner also attended the Army Military Freefall Parachutist School at Yuma Proving Grounds, Arizona, and lastly the U.S. Air Force Combat Diver school in Panama City, Florida. After completing the Combat Control training pipeline he was assigned to the 21st Special Tactics Squadron at Pope AFB (later Pope Field).

In addition to his Air Force Cross, Rhyner has received the Bronze Star Medal, three Purple Hearts, and the Air Force Combat Action Medal. The first Purple Heart he received was for his actions in the Battle of Shok Valley, while the second Purple Heart was from a deployment to southern Afghanistan in 2009. He received his third purple heart in March 2013, when a gunshot wound shattered his right femur and severed his sciatic nerve. Rhyner medically retired in 2015 as a result of wounds sustained in combat that prevented mobility below the knee.

=== Battle of Shok Valley ===
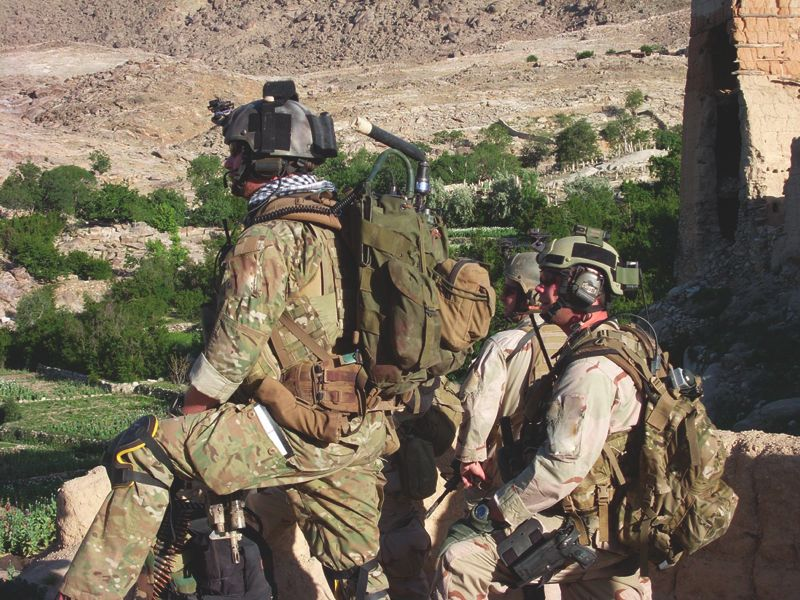
Zachary Rhyner and Army Special Forces soldiers of ODA 3336 in the Shok Valley prior to the battle

On 6 April 2008, a 130-man combined assault force, dubbed Commando Wrath, performed a day-time rotary-wing insertion down into a remote valley of the Nuristan Province, Afghanistan. Commando Wrath was composed of three Special Forces teams with each team having a Combat Controller attached, and a company from the 201st Afghan Commando Battalion. Rhyner, just six months out of training and on his first deployment, was attached to the C2-element (command and control) of Army Special Forces Operational Detachment Alpha 3336, from the 3rd Special Forces Group. Their mission was to capture Haji Ghafour, a high-ranking commander of the Hezb-e-Islami Gulbuddin (HIG) militant group. Shortly after landing the assault force was ambushed and pinned down and the assault force was split in two on either side of a river.

Rhyner and several Special Forces members were wounded throughout the course of the battle. Rhyner was shot twice in the chest and once in the leg, although his protective vest stopped the two bullets to his chest from causing a mortal injury. Despite being wounded within the first fifteen minutes of the battle, Rhyner continued to direct close air support and airstrikes until the assault force was evacuated seven hours later. 50 of the airstrikes he called in were within 200m of friendly positions; the term "danger close" is applied when referring to airstrikes within 600m. He was credited with saving the entire 100-man team from being overrun twice. According to the Air Force Cross citation, during the battle Rhyner directed close air support and airstrikes totalling 4,570 cannon rounds, nine Hellfire missiles, 162 rockets, a dozen 500-pound bombs, and one 2,000-pound bomb. As a result of the same battle, ten U.S. Army soldiers, nine Special Forces and one Combat Cameraman received the Silver Star, the greatest number of Silver Stars awarded for a single battle since the Vietnam War.

Capt. Stewart Parker, the Command and Control Special Forces commander at Bagram Air Base during the battle, said of Rhyner: "Rhyner is out of training less than a year and is in one of the most difficult situations ... it is an absolute testament to his character and the training these guys take. It tells me we are doing something right." During a Fox News interview with Glenn Beck, Beck asked Rhyner, "there are only—what is it?—192 people who have ever received the Air Force Cross. ... How do you put that together in your head? I mean, you are in a very elite group." Rhyner simply replied with "Any other combat controller put in the same situation would have performed in the same, exact way. ... Credit that to the training we receive and the process that we go through to become a combat controller." Future Air Force Cross recipient, and fellow Combat Controller, Robert Gutierrez was also present at the Battle of Shok Valley with Rhyner, albeit with a different Special Forces team, and regarding Rhyner's actions he said reportedly, "If it wasn't for Zach, I wouldn't be here."

== Awards and honors ==
=== Air Force Cross ===
The Air Force Cross was presented to him by Secretary of the Air Force Michael B. Donley. Prior to presenting the award Donley stated to Rhyner "Your actions are now and forever woven into the rich fabric of service, integrity and excellence that has connected generations of America's Airmen since the very inception of airpower, Rarely do we present an Airman with the Air Force Cross, let alone a Purple Heart, and with good reason. The Air Force Cross is reserved for those who demonstrate unparalleled valor in the face of insurmountable odds." Afterwards, Chief of Staff of the United States Air Force General Norton Schwartz presented Rhyner with his Purple Heart. The last time an Air Force Cross was bestowed upon a living recipient was when Timothy Wilkinson was awarded it for his heroic actions during the 1993 Battle of Mogadishu.

=== Citation ===

The President of the United States of America, authorized by Title 10, Section 8742, United States Code, takes pleasure in presenting the Air Force Cross to Senior Airman Zachary J. Rhyner, United States Air Force, for extraordinary heroism in military operations against an armed enemy of the United States while serving with the 21st Special Tactics Squadron, at Nuristan Province, Afghanistan on 6 April 2008. On that date, while assigned as Special Tactics Combat Controller, Airman Rhyner executed a day rotary-wing infiltration with his Special Forces team to capture high-value insurgents in a village on the surrounding mountains. While climbing near vertical terrain to reach their objective, the team was attacked in a well-coordinated and deadly ambush. Devastating sniper, machine gun, and rocket-propelled grenade fire poured down on the team from elevated and protected positions on all sides, immediately pinning down the assault force. Without regard for his life, Airman Rhyner placed himself between the most immediate threats and provided suppressive fire with his M-4 rifle against enemy fire while teammates were extracted from the line of fire. Airman Rhyner bravely withstood the hail of enemy fire to control eight United States Air Force fighters and four United States Army attack helicopters. Despite a gunshot wound to the left leg and being trapped on a 60-foot cliff under constant enemy fire, Airman Rhyner controlled more than 50 attack runs and repeatedly repelled the enemy with repeated danger close air strikes, several within 100 meters of his position. Twice, his actions prevented his element from being overrun during the intense six-and-a-half-hour battle. Through his extraordinary heroism, superb airmanship, and aggressiveness in the face of the enemy, Airman Rhyner reflected the highest credit upon himself and the United States Air Force.

=== Commendations ===
MSgt Rhyner's awards include the following:

Badge	Basic Parachutist Badge		
Badge	Military Freefall Parachutist Badge		
1st Row	Air Force Cross		
2nd Row	Purple Heart	Joint Service Commendation Medal	Air Force Commendation Medal with "V" device and 2 Oak leaf clusters
3rd Row	Air Force Combat Action Medal	Air Force Meritorious Unit Award	Air Force Good Conduct Medal with 1 Oak leaf cluster
4th Row	National Defense Service Medal	Afghanistan Campaign Medal with 2 Campaign stars	Iraq Campaign Medal with 1 Campaign star
5th Row	Global War on Terrorism Service Medal	Humanitarian Service Medal	Air Force Expeditionary Service Ribbon with frame
6th Row	Air Force Longevity Service Award with 1 Oak leaf cluster	NCO Professional Military Education Graduate Ribbon	USAF Basic Training Honor Graduate Ribbon
7th Row	Small Arms Expert Marksmanship Ribbon with 1 Service star	Air Force Training Ribbon	NATO Medal for ex-Yugoslavia
Badge	U.S. Air Force Scuba Diver Badge		

=== Other honors ===
In 2008 he was presented the Jewish Institute for National Security Affairs' Grateful Nation Award by the Chairman of the Joint Chiefs of Staff, Navy Admiral Mike Mullen, for his actions during the Battle of Shok Valley. In 2009 Rhyner won a United Service Organizations of Metropolitan Washington Special Salute award as the 2008 USO Airman of the Year for his heroic efforts in Afghanistan the year prior. The award was presented to him by Air Force General Norton Schwartz.
