= Robert James Miller =

US Army Medal of Honor recipient (1983–2008)

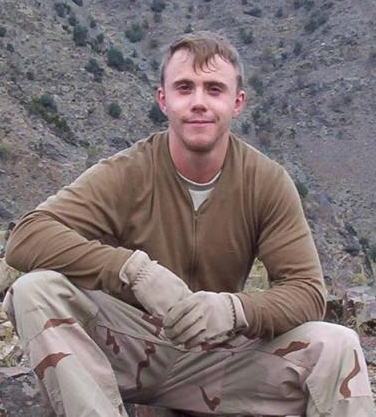
- Robert J. Miller in Afghanistan
- Born: October 14, 1983; Harrisburg, Pennsylvania, United States
- Died: January 25, 2008 (aged 24); Nari District, Kunar Province, Afghanistan
- Burial place: All Faiths Memorial Park; Casselberry, Florida
- Military career
- Allegiance: United States
- Branch: United States Army
- Service years: 2003–2008
- Rank: Staff Sergeant
- Units: Company A, 3rd Battalion, 3rd Special Forces Group
- Conflicts: War in Afghanistan †
- Awards: Medal of Honor; Bronze Star Medal; Purple Heart; Meritorious Service Medal

Robert James Miller (October 14, 1983 – January 25, 2008) was a United States Army Special Forces soldier who posthumously received the Medal of Honor for his actions during the War in Afghanistan.

== Military career ==
Miller was born in Pennsylvania, the second of eight children, and grew up in Illinois. His family had a tradition of military service stretching back to the Revolutionary War. He attended one year at University of Iowa before deciding to join the Army. He enlisted as a Special Forces trainee on August 14, 2003 and graduated from Infantry Basic Training and Airborne School at Fort Benning, Georgia, on January 6, 2004. Miller graduated from the Special Forces Assessment and Selection phase on September 26, 2004, and the Special Forces Weapons Sergeant Course on March 4, 2005. Miller received his Special Forces Tab and was promoted to sergeant after graduating from the Special Operations French Language Training Course, September 30, 2005. He was assigned the same day to Company A, 3rd Battalion, 3rd Special Forces Group (Airborne), Fort Bragg, North Carolina.

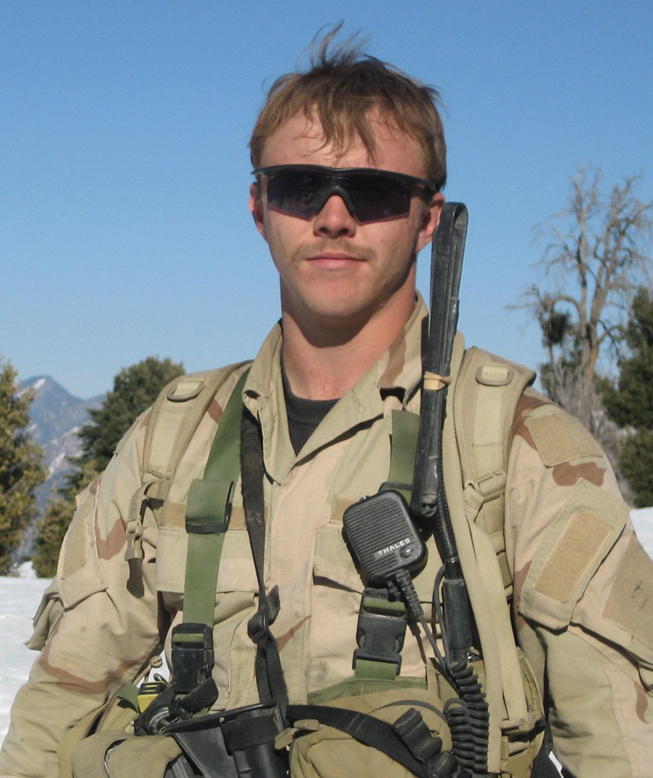

Miller deployed to Afghanistan in support of Operation Enduring Freedom from August 2006 to March 2007, which spanned both Consolidation I and Consolidation II. During this deployment, Miller received two Army Commendation Medals with Valor device for his courage under fire. While his language training was in French, he also learned to speak Pashto to better communicate with their Afghan Allies. Teammates recalled that he epitomized the Special Forces soldier "Him just spending time, not just time training but time after the sun goes down, drinking chai with them, eating, speaking with them in Pashto...He was what I pictured a Special Forces soldier [should be]". After returning stateside, he attended and completed Ranger School. In October 2007, he returned to Afghanistan for his second tour as weapons sergeant for his team. Miller was killed in combat with the Taliban in Afghanistan on January 25, 2008. His unit was conducting combat operations near the village of Barikowt, Nari District, Kunar Province, Afghanistan. He is buried at All Faiths Memorial Park in Casselberry, Florida. Miller's special skill decorations include: Special Forces Tab, Ranger Tab and Parachutist Badge.

Miller was inducted as a Laureate of The Lincoln Academy of Illinois and awarded the Order of Lincoln (the State's highest honor) by the Governor of Illinois in 2012 in the area of Government.

=== Medal of Honor ===
On January 25, 2008, ODA 3312 embarked on a pre-dawn joint combat patrol with Afghan National Security Forces in the Kunar Province near the Pakistan border. Twice along their route, they were forced to use demolitions to remove boulders blocking the road. Knowing that these were often used to effect ambushes, the patrol detached a dismounted element, with Miller taking point, to provide overwatch for the vehicles. Upon reaching the target area, they identified enemy positions with a drone, then initiated contact. Miller began laying down fire from his vehicle's MK 19 grenade launcher; when it was disabled, he switched to the mounted M240 machine gun, all the while identifying enemy positions for an airstrike. Following the airstrike the patrol moved forward to perform a bomb damage assessment (BDA). As the only SF member who spoke Pashto, Miller organized the Afghan fighters and took point once again. While crossing an exposed area, insurgents dug-in behind cover sprung an ambush and poured rifle, machine gun, and rocket-propelled grenade fire down at them.

Their team was caught with little to no cover while insurgent reinforcements arrived, swelling the enemy to nearly 150 fighters. Instead of retreating, Miller charged forward and eliminated a machine gun team and several fighters who were keeping his teammates pinned. Seeing that his team was still in danger, he charged forward again using his M249 SAW and fragmentation grenades to kill and/or wound at least 10 insurgents. Only once his team had found cover did he begin to pull back. As he maneuvered, Miller was wounded in the chest. Around this time, his team's commander had also been seriously wounded in the chest and shoulder and called for their forces to fall back. Instead, Miller pushed the fight, engaging the enemy and drawing their fire so his captain could be pulled to safety. Cut off and alone, Miller continued to push the fight, calling out enemy positions for his teammates while engaging them until he had expended all of his SAW ammo and his last grenade. He was still alive when two teammates got to his position and began to provide medical care but died moments later. In all, the firefight lasted seven hours and required a quick reaction force's reinforcements and additional close air support to finish the engagement. The enemy suffered 40+ dead and 60+ wounded of which Miller himself killed 16+ and wounded 30+. His courageous actions saved his 8 man team and the 15 Afghans with them.

== Awards ==
Staff Sergeant Miller's decorations include:

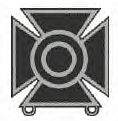

Badge	Combat Infantryman Badge		
Badge	Parachutist Badge		
1st Row	Medal of Honor		Bronze Star
2nd Row	Purple Heart	Meritorious Service Medal	Army Commendation Medal with "V" device and 1 Oak leaf cluster
3rd Row	Good Conduct Medal	National Defense Service Medal	Afghanistan Campaign Medal with 2 campaign stars
4th Row	Global War on Terrorism Expeditionary Medal	Global War on Terrorism Service Medal	Army NCO Professional Development Ribbon with award numeral 2
5th Row	Army Service Ribbon	Army Overseas Service Ribbon with award numeral 2	NATO Medal for service with ISAF with 1 Service star
Badges	Special Forces Tab	Ranger Tab	Sharpshooter Badge with Rifle component bar
Unit awards	Joint Meritorious Unit Award	Meritorious Unit Commendation	Army Superior Unit Award

== Medal of Honor citation ==
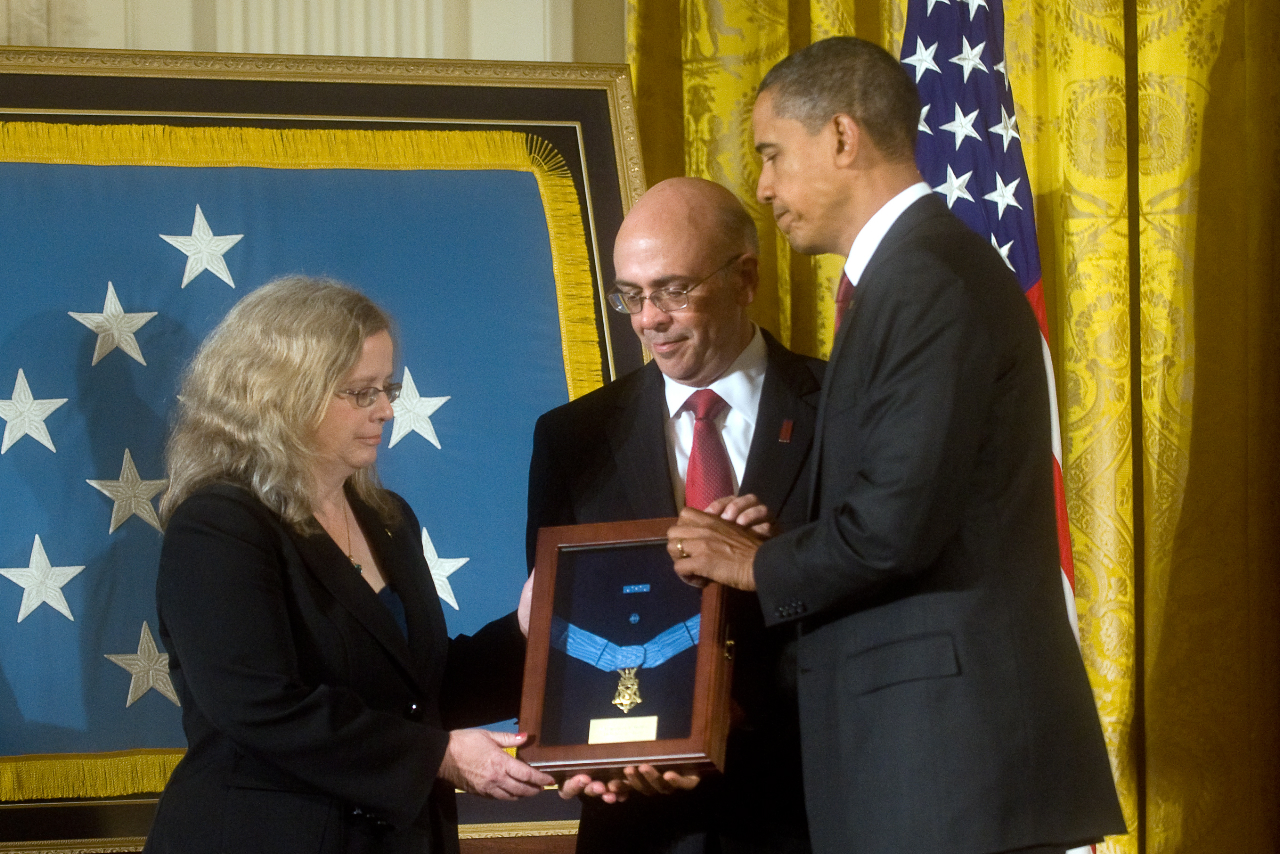
President Barack Obama presents the Medal of Honor posthumously to Phil and Maureen Miller, the parents SSG Miller on October 6, 2010.

The President of the United States of America, authorized by act of Congress, March 3, 1863, has awarded, in the name of the Congress, the MEDAL OF HONOR posthumously to

STAFF SERGEANT ROBERT JAMES MILLER
UNITED STATES ARMY

for service as set forth in the following

For conspicuous gallantry and intrepidity at the risk of his life above and beyond the call of duty:

Staff Sergeant Robert J. Miller distinguished himself by extraordinary acts of heroism while serving as the Weapons Sergeant in Special Forces Operational Detachment Alpha 3312, Special Operations Task Force-33, Combined Joint Special Operations Task Force-Afghanistan during combat operations against an armed enemy in Kunar Province, Afghanistan on 25 January 2008. While conducting a combat reconnaissance patrol through the Gowardesh Valley, Staff Sergeant Miller and his small element of U.S. and Afghan National Army soldiers engaged a force of 15 to 20 insurgents occupying prepared fighting positions. Staff Sergeant Miller initiated the assault by engaging the enemy positions with his vehicle’s turret-mounted Mark-19 40 millimeter automatic grenade launcher while simultaneously providing detailed descriptions of the enemy positions to his command, enabling effective, accurate close air support. Following the engagement, Staff Sergeant Miller led a small squad forward to conduct a battle damage assessment. As the group neared the small, steep, narrow valley that the enemy had inhabited, a large, well-coordinated insurgent force initiated a near ambush, assaulting from elevated positions with ample cover. Exposed and with little available cover, the patrol was totally vulnerable to enemy rocket propelled grenades and automatic weapon fire. As point man, Staff Sergeant Miller was at the front of the patrol, cut off from supporting elements, and less than 20 meters from enemy forces. Nonetheless, with total disregard for his own safety, he called for his men to quickly move back to covered positions as he charged the enemy over exposed ground and under overwhelming enemy fire in order to provide protective fire for his team.

While maneuvering to engage the enemy, Staff Sergeant Miller was shot in his upper torso. Ignoring the wound, he continued to push the fight, moving to draw fire from over one hundred enemy fighters upon himself. He then again charged forward through an open area in order to allow his teammates to safely reach cover. After killing at least 10 insurgents, wounding dozens more, and repeatedly exposing himself to withering enemy fire while moving from position to position, Staff Sergeant Miller was mortally wounded by enemy fire. His extraordinary valor ultimately saved the lives of seven members of his own team and 15 Afghanistan National Army soldiers. Staff Sergeant Miller’s heroism and selflessness above and beyond the call of duty, and at the cost of his own life, are in keeping with the highest traditions of military service and reflect great credit upon himself and the United States Army.

BARACK OBAMA
/s/ Barack Obama
PRESIDENT OF THE UNITED STATES OF AMERICA

== See also ==
- List of Post Vietnam Medal of Honor recipients
