= No Man Left Behind =

American television series

No Man Left Behind is an American television series which aired on the National Geographic Channel. The series tells the stories of American and British military encounters using archival footage, reenactments and testimony from those who were involved.

== Episodes ==
=== Season 1 ===
Episode number	Title	Subject	Air date
01	The Real Black Hawk Down	Black Hawk Down incident	June 28, 2016
02	Colombia Vice	DEA agents injured in Colombia in 1982	July 5, 2016
03	To Hell and Back	Battle of Shok Valley	July 12, 2016
04	The One That Got Away	Bravo Two Zero	July 19, 2016
05	Stealth Fighter Down	Downing of Dale Zelko	July 26, 2016
06	Memories of Hell	Shootdown, capture and escape of Charles Klusmann	August 2, 2016
