= Ronald J. Shurer =

US Army Medal of Honor recipient (1978–2020)

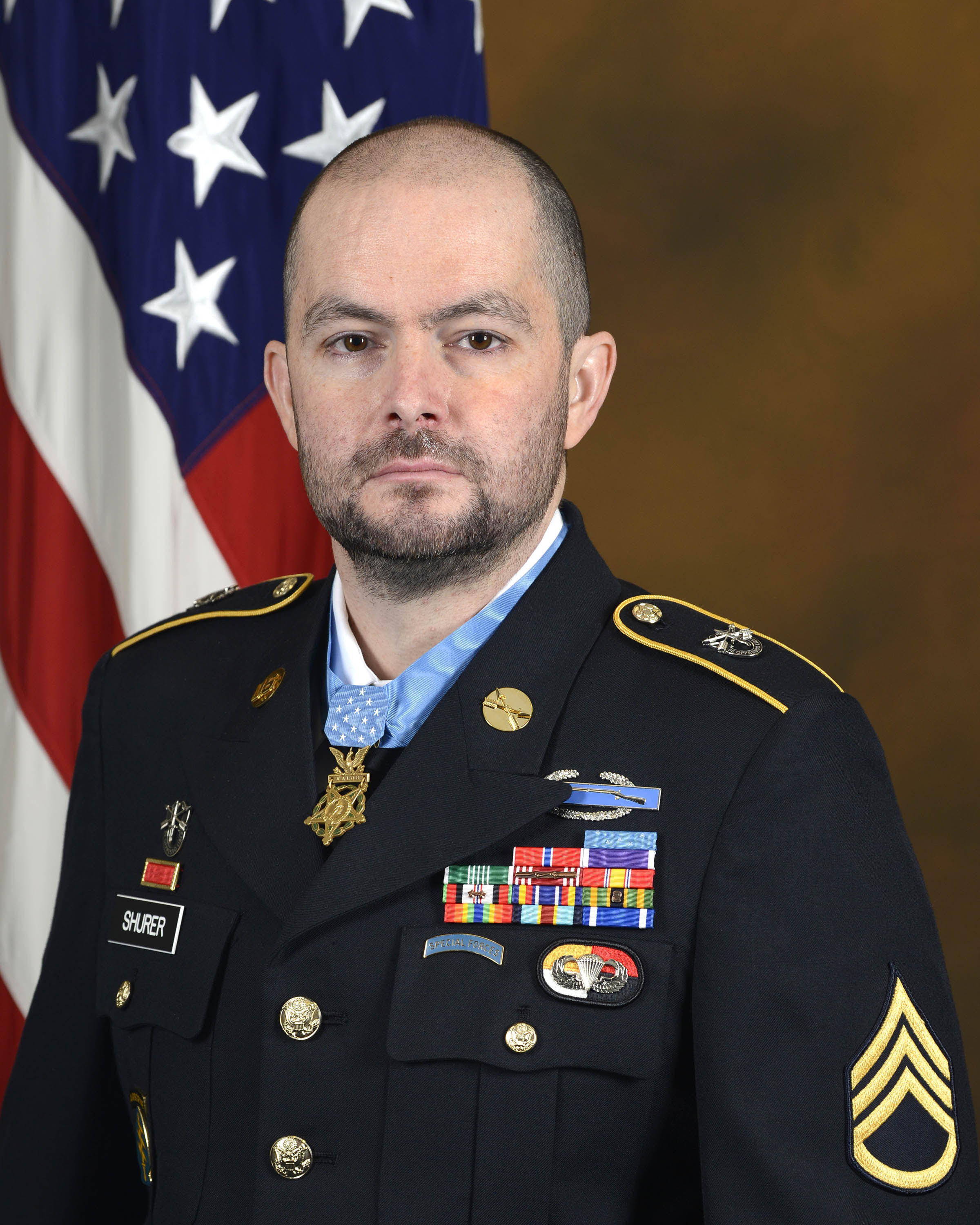
- Shurer in 2018
- Born: December 7, 1978; Fairbanks, Alaska, U.S.
- Died: May 14, 2020 (aged 41); Washington, D.C., US
- Burial place: Arlington National Cemetery
- Military career
- Allegiance: United States
- Branch: United States Army
- Service years: 2002–2009
- Rank: Staff Sergeant
- Unit: 3rd Special Forces Group
- Conflicts: War in Afghanistan: Battle of Shok Valley
- Awards: Medal of Honor; Bronze Star Medal; Purple Heart; Army Commendation Medal
- Other work: Special agent, United States Secret Service

Ronald Joseph Shurer II (December 7, 1978 – May 14, 2020) was a United States Army Special Forces staff sergeant and medic. As a senior medical sergeant during the Battle of Shok Valley in April 2008, he and his team were attacked by an enemy force of more than 200 fighters. Shurer fought for more than an hour to reach part of his unit, killing several insurgents along the way. He was initially awarded a Silver Star for this action, but in 2016 The Pentagon upgraded this recognition to a Medal of Honor. He received the latter honor in a White House ceremony on October 1, 2018.

== Early life and education ==
Shurer was born in Fairbanks, Alaska, on December 7, 1978, to parents both serving in the United States Air Force. Much of his childhood was spent in the Tacoma, Washington area where his father was stationed at McChord Air Force Base. Shurer graduated from Rogers High School in Puyallup, Washington in 1997, and Washington State University, where he received a bachelor's degree in business administration in 2001. At that point Shurer planned to enlist in the United States Marine Corps and was initially accepted into the Officer Candidate School but was later rejected when it was found he had pancreatitis caused by trauma from an earlier bicycle accident. Instead, he started working towards a master's degree at Washington State. He completed one year then enlisted in the United States Army from Spokane, Washington, in September 2002.

== Military career ==
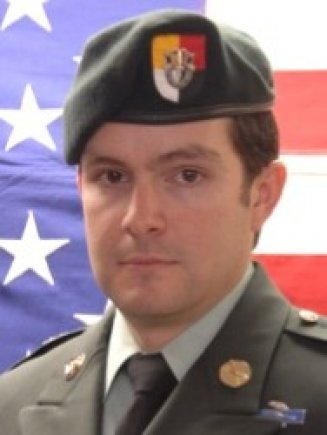
Ronald Shurer service photograph

Shurer initially trained as an army medic and subsequently qualified to train as a Special Forces medic. This training included an internship in a hospital emergency room and completion of the national paramedic training program. He was promoted from sergeant to staff sergeant with the 3rd Special Forces Group on December 1, 2006. He was deployed with Combined Joint Special Operations Task Force in Afghanistan from November 2007 to May 2008 in Operation Enduring Freedom.

=== Battle of Shok Valley ===
On April 6, 2008, the team was participating in a joint US-Afghan raid designed to kill or capture Gulbuddin Hekmatyar, the leader of Hezb-e Islami Gulbuddin (HIG) in the Shok Valley of Nuristan Province of Afghanistan.

While moving through the valley, the team came under enemy machine gun, sniper and rocket-propelled grenade fire. The team suffered several casualties and became pinned down on a mountainside. To reach the first wounded soldier, who had received RPG shrapnel in his neck, Shurer ran through enemy fire. He continued up the mountain, returning fire for another hour and killing several insurgents to reach more wounded soldiers. He stabilized four more wounded soldiers and then received more enemy fire including a strike to his helmet and a wound to his arm. He then treated a soldier who lost a leg and continued aiding the injured and fighting the enemy for several more hours. He helped evacuate the wounded back down the mountain to a medevac helicopter, at times using his body as a shield against debris being dislodged from the cliff by the firefight.

The story of Shurer's actions that day are the subject of a chapter in the book No Way Out: A Story of Valor in the Mountains of Afghanistan.

== Recognition ==
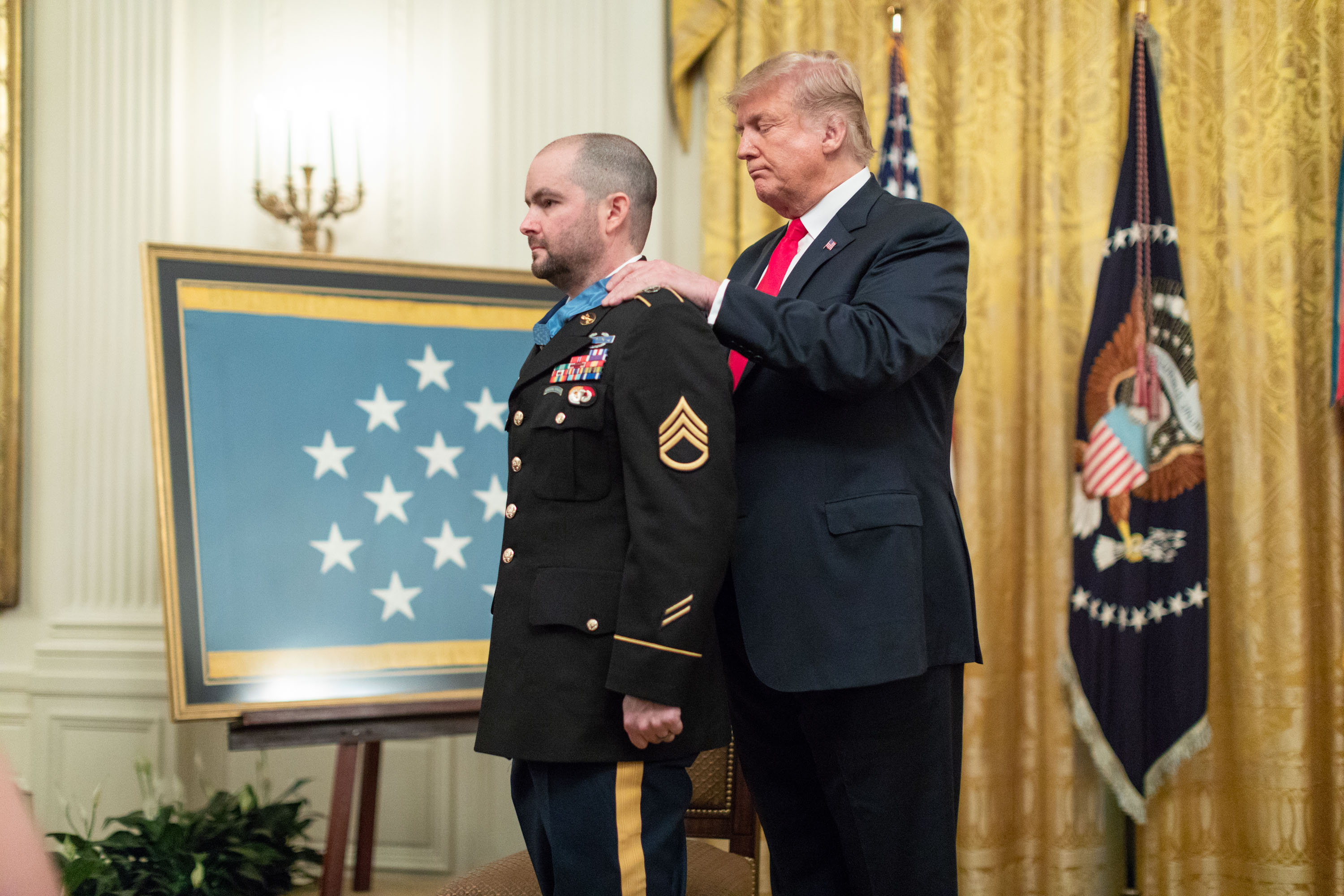
Shurer receiving the Medal of Honor from President Donald Trump in October 2018

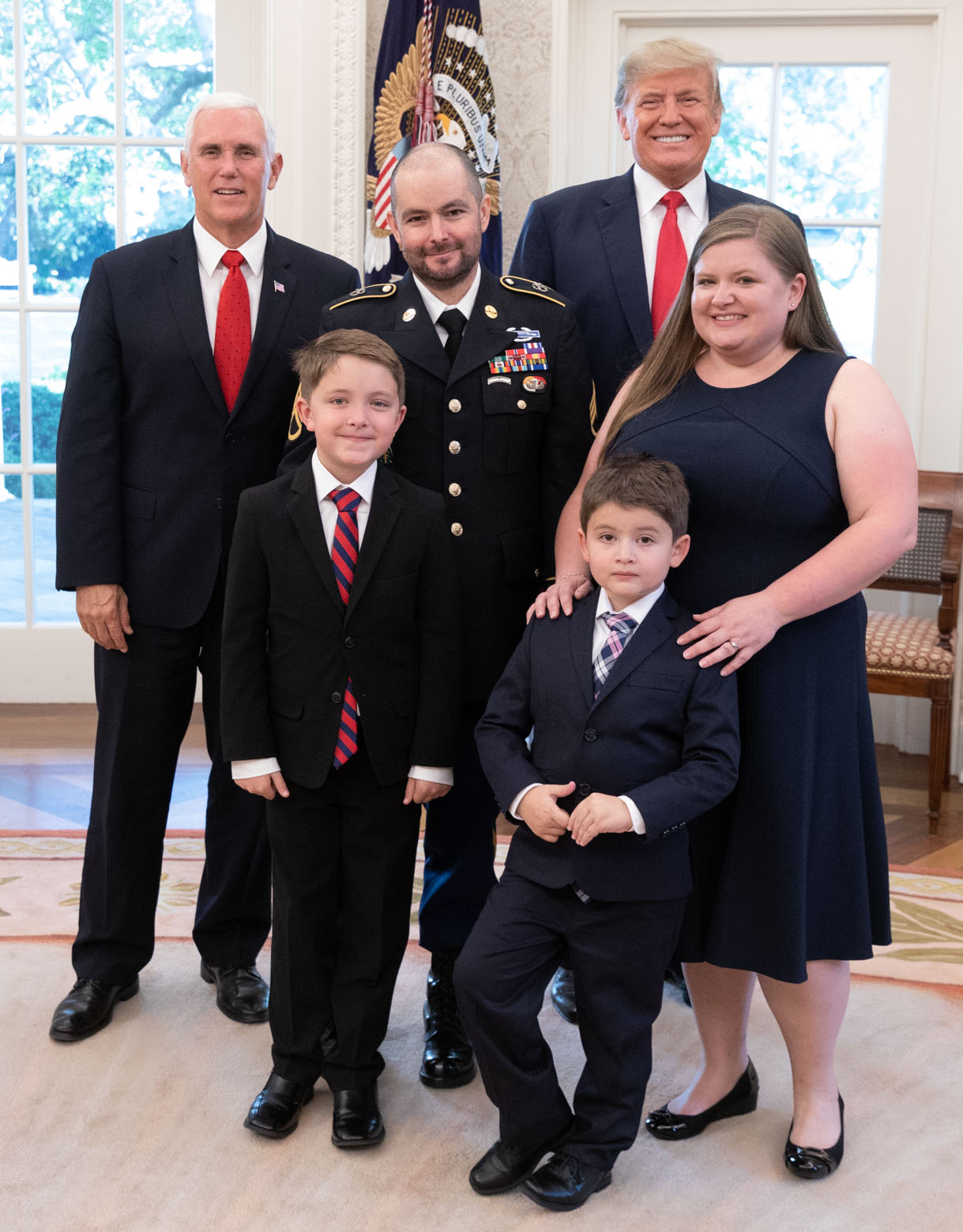
Shurer with his family, President Trump, and Vice President Mike Pence

Shurer was initially awarded the Silver Star for his role in the operation. In 2016, the Pentagon conducted a review of all valor medals awarded since the 9/11 terror attacks and this resulted in Shurer's award being upgraded to the Medal of Honor. He received the award from President Donald Trump on October 1, 2018, in a ceremony at the White House.

=== Medal of Honor citation ===

The President of the United States of America, authorized by Act of Congress, March 3, 1863, has awarded in the name of Congress the Medal of Honor to

STAFF SERGEANT RONALD J. SHURER II UNITED STATES ARMY

For conspicuous gallantry and intrepidity at the risk of his life above and beyond the call of duty:

Staff Sergeant Ronald J. Shurer II distinguished himself by acts of gallantry and intrepidity above and beyond the call of duty on April 6, 2008, while serving as a Senior Medical Sergeant, Special Forces Operational Detachment Alpha 3336, Special Operations Task Force-33, in support of Operation Enduring Freedom. Staff Sergeant Shurer was part of an assault element inserted by helicopter into a location in Afghanistan. As the assault element moved up a near vertical mountain toward its objective, it was engaged by fierce enemy machine gun, sniper, and rocket-propelled grenade fire. The lead portion of the assault element, which included the ground commander, sustained several casualties and became pinned down on the mountainside. Staff Sergeant Shurer and the rest of the trailing portion of the assault element were likewise engaged by enemy machine gun, sniper, and rocket-propelled grenade fire. As the attack intensified, Staff Sergeant Shurer braved enemy fire to move to an injured Soldier and treat his wounds. Having stabilized the injured Soldier, Staff Sergeant Shurer then learned of the casualties among the lead element. Staff Sergeant Shurer fought his way up the mountainside, under intense enemy fire, to the lead element’s location. Upon reaching the lead element, he treated and stabilized two more Soldiers. Finishing those lifesaving efforts, Staff Sergeant Shurer noticed two additional severely wounded Soldiers under intense enemy fire. The bullet that had wounded one of these Soldiers had also impacted Staff Sergeant Shurer’s helmet. With complete disregard for his own life, Staff Sergeant Shurer again moved through enemy fire to treat and stabilize one Soldier’s severely wounded arm. Shortly thereafter, Staff Sergeant Shurer continued to brave withering enemy fire to get to the other Soldier’s location in order to treat his lower leg, which had been almost completely severed by a high-caliber sniper round. After treating the Soldier, Staff Sergeant Shurer began to evacuate the wounded; carrying and lowering them down the sheer mountainside. While moving down the mountain, Staff Sergeant Shurer used his own body to shield the wounded from enemy fire and debris caused by danger-close air strikes. Reaching the base of the mountain, Staff Sergeant Shurer set up a casualty collection point and continued to treat the wounded. With the arrival of the medical evacuation helicopter, Staff Sergeant Shurer, again under enemy fire, helped load the wounded into the helicopter. Having ensured the safety of the wounded, Staff Sergeant Shurer then regained control of his commando squad and rejoined the fight. He continued to lead his troops and emplace security elements until it was time to move to the evacuation landing zone for the helicopter. Staff Sergeant Shurer’s actions are in keeping with the finest traditions of military service and reflect great credit upon himself, Combined Joint Special Operations Task Force-Afghanistan, Special Operations Command Central, and the United States Army.

== Post-army ==
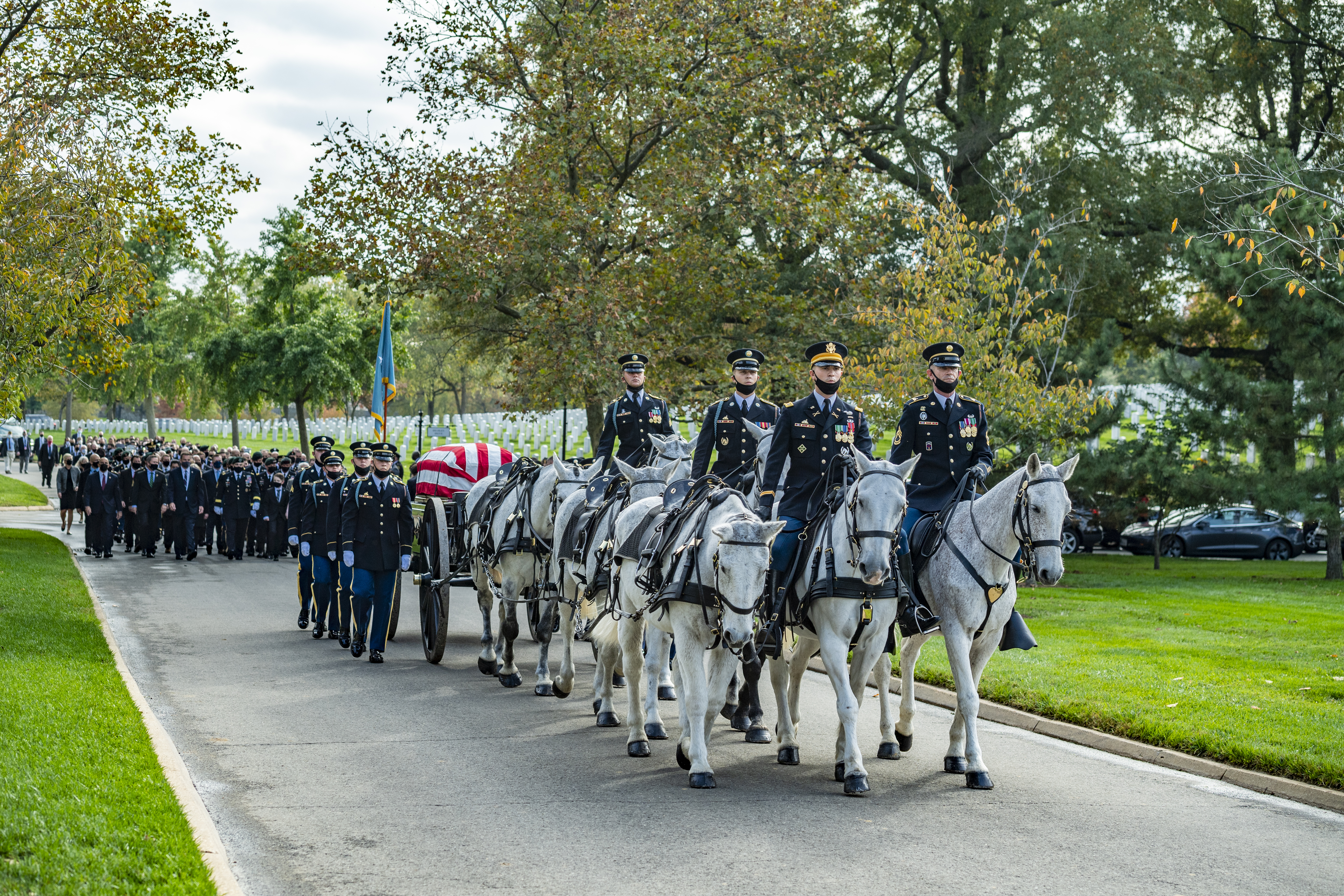
Shurer's funeral at Arlington National Cemetery (October 27, 2020)

Shurer was honorably discharged in May 2009 and became a special agent in the Phoenix office of the United States Secret Service. He was later selected for the agency's Counter Assault Team and assigned to its Special Operations Division in Washington, D.C. He lived in Burke, Virginia, with his wife and two sons. Shurer was diagnosed with stage 4 lung cancer in 2017, and on May 14, 2020, he died as a result of the disease at the age of 41. Shurer was interred at Arlington National Cemetery on October 27, 2020.

== Awards and decorations ==

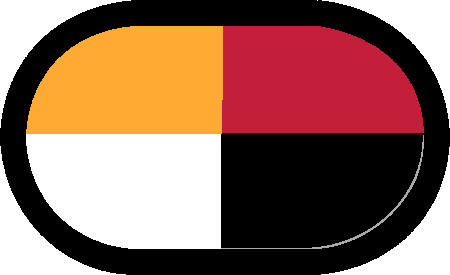

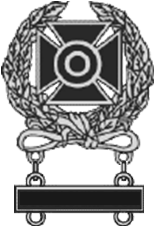

Badge	Combat Infantryman Badge		
1st row	Medal of Honor (upgraded from the Silver Star)	Bronze Star	Purple Heart
2nd row	Army Commendation Medal	Army Good Conduct Medal with bronze clasp and 2 loops (2 awards)	National Defense Service Medal
3rd row	Afghanistan Campaign Medal with 2 Campaign stars	Global War on Terrorism Service Medal	NCO Professional Development Ribbon with award numeral 2
4th row	Army Service Ribbon	Overseas Service Ribbon	NATO Medal for the former Yugoslavia
Badges	Special Forces Tab	Basic Parachutist Badge with 3rd Special Forces Group background trimming	Expert Marksmanship Badge with rifle component bar

United States Army Special Forces; Combat Service Identification Badge
United States Army Special Forces; Distinctive Unit Insignia
Meritorious Unit Commendation
2 Service stripes
2 Overseas Service Bars
