= Matthew O. Williams =

United States Army Medal of Honor recipient

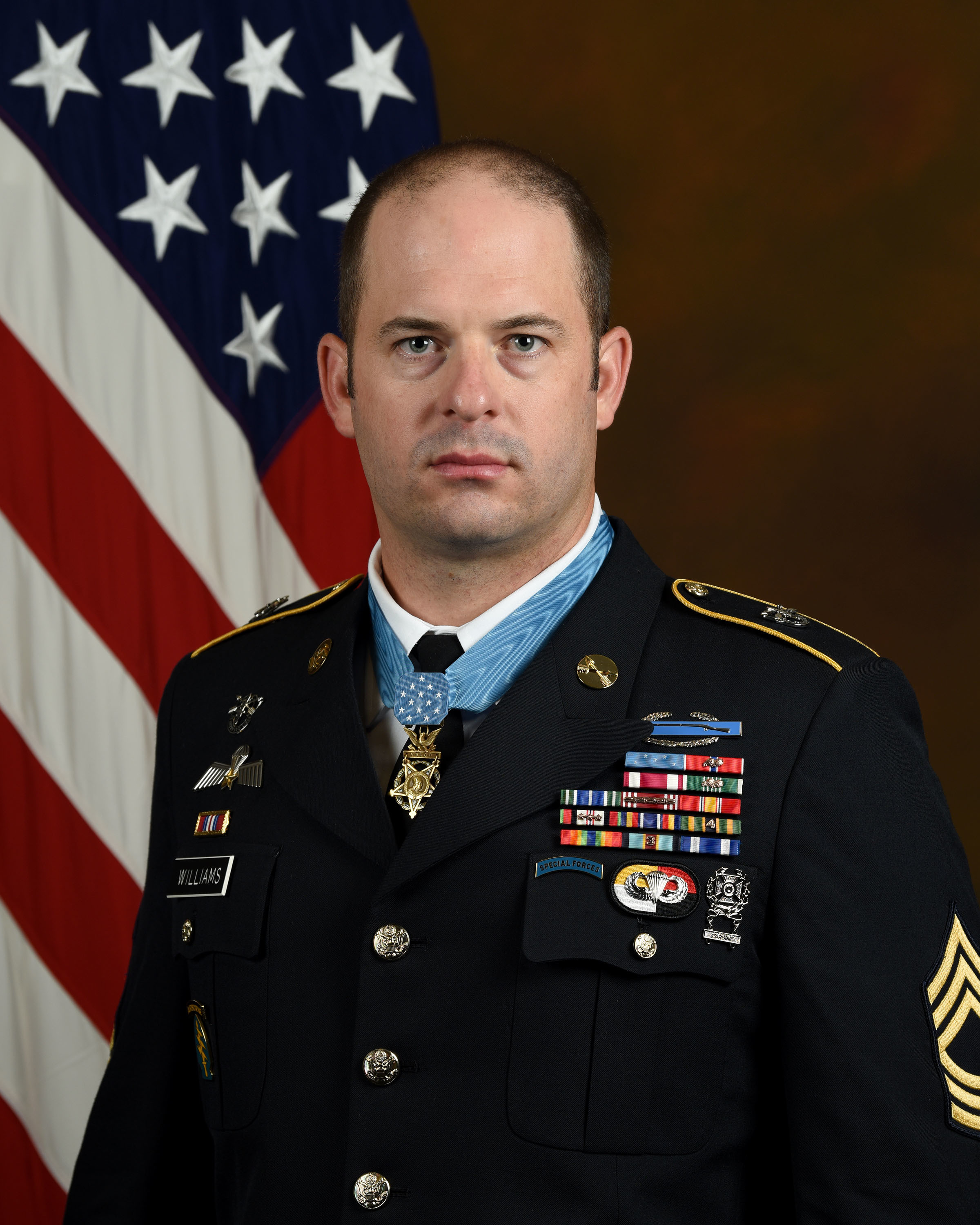
- Born: October 3, 1981 (age 45); Boerne, Texas, U.S.
- Military career
- Allegiance: United States
- Branch: United States Army
- Service years: 2005–2025
- Rank: Command Sergeant Major
- Units: U.S. Army John F. Kennedy Special Warfare Center and School
- Conflicts: Operation Enduring Freedom: Battle of Shok Valley; Operation Juniper Shield
- Awards: Medal of Honor; Bronze Star Medal (3); Meritorious Service Medal

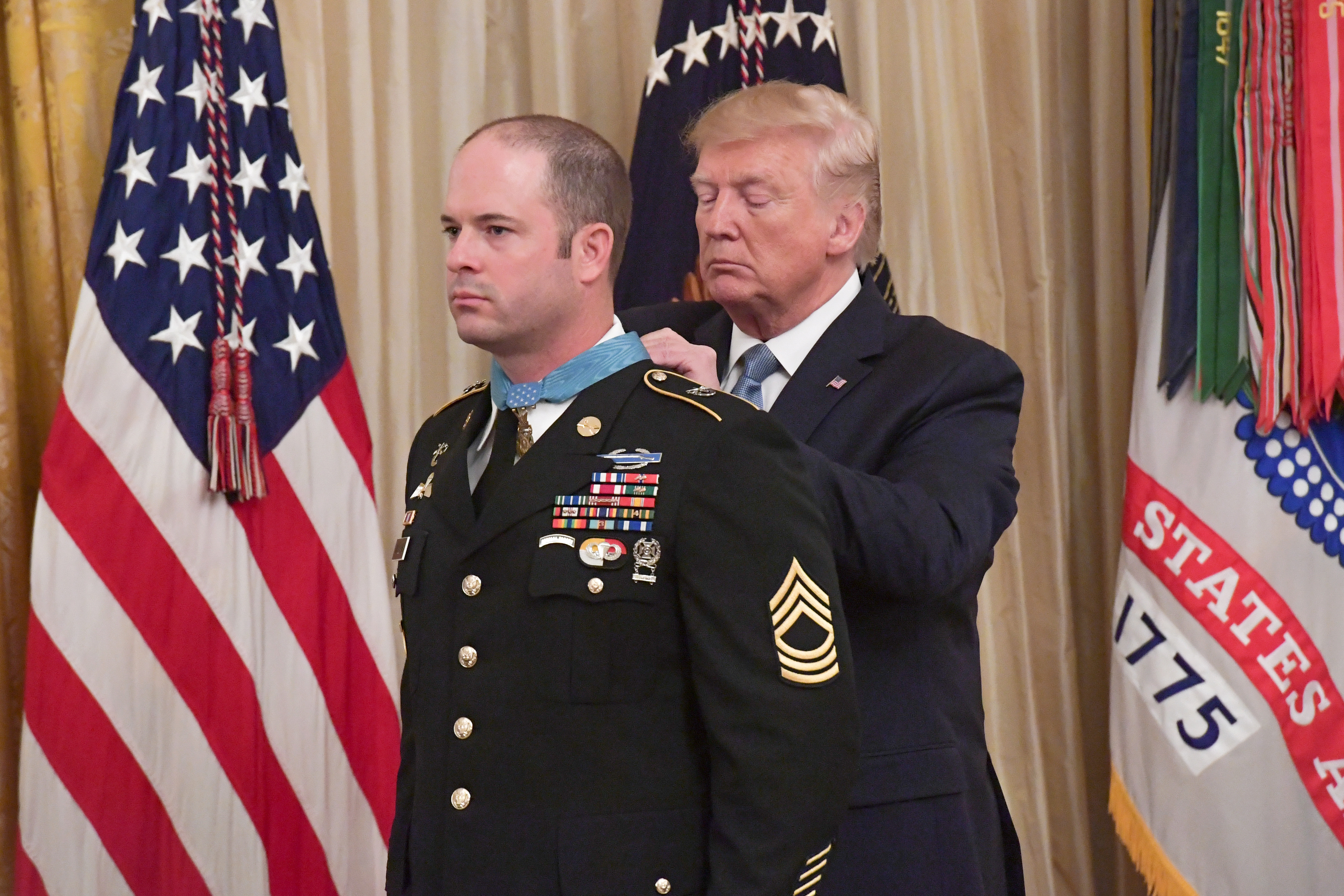
Williams being presented with the Medal of Honor, October 30, 2019

Matthew O. Williams (born October 3, 1981) is a retired sergeant major in the United States Army. He received the Medal of Honor (upgraded from a Silver Star) on October 30, 2019, for his actions as a sergeant on April 6, 2008, as a member of Operational Detachment Alpha 3336, Special Operations Task Force 11, Combined Joint Special Operations Task Force-Afghanistan in the Battle of Shok Valley.

== Early life ==
Williams was born October 3, 1981, and spent most of his childhood in the small town of Boerne, Texas. He initially wanted to be a detective or work for the FBI when he grew up, so he obtained a bachelor's degree in criminal justice at Angelo State University in San Angelo, Texas. After 9/11, Williams started rethinking how he could serve his country. He researched Special Forces programs and, in September 2005, joined the United States Army.

== Military career ==
In 2007, two years after he had joined the army, Williams became a Special Forces Weapons Sergeant (18B) with the 3rd Special Forces Group. Williams' first deployment was to Afghanistan and, on April 6, 2008, his unit was tasked to capture or kill high-value targets in the Shok Valley. The operation led to the events for which Williams was awarded the Medal of Honor.

Williams was promoted to sergeant major during a ceremony at Fort Bragg, North Carolina, on February 28, 2020.

As of 2026, Williams, Lieutenant Colonel William D. Swenson, Sergeant Major Thomas Payne, and CW5 Eric Slover are the only Medal of Honor recipients still on active duty. One recipient, Dakota Meyer, is serving part-time after reenlisting with the United States Marine Corps Reserve in April 2025.

== Awards and decorations ==
President Donald J. Trump presents Army Master Sgt. Matthew Williams with the Medal of Honor at the White House, Oct. 30, 2019.

Personal decorations
	Medal of Honor (upgraded from the Silver Star)
Width-44 scarlet ribbon with width-4 ultramarine blue stripe at center, surrounded by width-1 white stripes. Width-1 white stripes are at the edges.	Bronze Star Medal with two bronze oak leaf clusters
	Meritorious Service Medal
	Army Commendation Medal with two oak leaf clusters
	Army Achievement Medal
	Army Good Conduct Medal (5 awards)
	National Defense Service Medal
	Afghanistan Campaign Medal with three bronze service stars
	Global War on Terrorism Service Medal
	NCO Professional Development Ribbon with bronze award numeral 4
	Army Service Ribbon
	Army Overseas Service Ribbon with award numeral 3
	NATO Medal for service with ISAF
Unit awards
	Valorous Unit Award

Other accoutrements
Combat Infantryman Badge
Special Forces Tab
Basic Parachutist Badge with 3rd Special Forces Group background trimming
Expert Marksmanship Badge with one weapon bar
Special Forces (United States Army) Combat Service Identification Badge
Dutch Parachutist Badge with star
Special Forces (United States Army) Distinctive Unit Insignia
5 Service stripes
5 Overseas Service Bars

== Medal of Honor citation ==
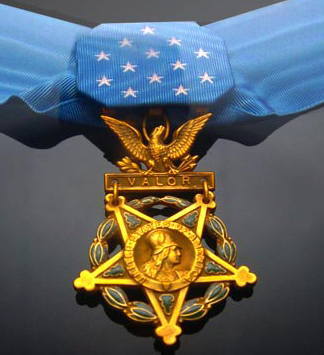

The President of the United States

In the Name of the Congress

Takes Pleasure in Presenting The Medal of Honor To

Sergeant Matthew O. Williams

United States Army

For Services as Set Forth in the Following Citation: Sergeant Williams distinguished himself by acts of gallantry and intrepidity above and beyond the call of duty on 6 April 2008, while serving as a Weapons Sergeant, Special Forces Operational Detachment Alpha 3336, Special Operations Task Force-33, in support of Operation ENDURING FREEDOM. Sergeant Williams was part of an assault element inserted by helicopter into a location in Afghanistan. As the assault element was moving up a mountain toward its objective, it was engaged by intense enemy machine gun, sniper, and rocket-propelled grenade fire. The lead portion of the assault element, which included the ground commander, sustained several casualties and became pinned down on the sheer mountainside. Sergeant Williams, upon hearing that the lead element had sustained casualties and was in danger of being overrun, braved intense enemy fire to lead a counter-attack across a valley of ice-covered boulders and a fast-moving, ice cold, and waist-deep river. Under withering fire, Sergeant Williams and his local national commandos fought up the terraced mountainside to the besieged element. Arriving at the lead element's position, Sergeant Williams arrayed his Afghan commandos to provide suppressive fire, which kept the insurgent fighters from overrunning the position. When the Team Sergeant was wounded, Sergeant Williams braved enemy fire once again to provide buddy-aid and to move the Team Sergeant down the sheer mountainside to the casualty collection point. Sergeant Williams then fought and climbed his way back up the mountainside to help defend the lead assault element that still had several serious casualties in need of evacuation. Sergeant Williams directed suppressive fire and exposed himself to enemy fire in order to reestablish the team's critical satellite radio communications. He then assisted with moving the wounded down the near-vertical mountainside to the casualty collection point. Noting that the collection point was about to be overrun by enemy fighters, Sergeant Williams led the Afghan commandos in a counter-attack that lasted for several hours. When helicopters arrived to evacuate the wounded, Sergeant Williams again exposed himself to enemy fire, carrying and loading casualties onto the helicopters while continuing to direct commando firepower to suppress numerous insurgent positions. His actions enabled the patrol to evacuate wounded and dead comrades without further casualties. Sergeant Williams' complete disregard for his own safety and his concern for the safety of his teammates ensured the survival of four critically wounded soldiers and prevented the lead element of the assault force from being overrun by the enemy. Sergeant Williams' actions are in keeping with the finest traditions of military service and reflect great credit upon himself, Combined Joint Special Operations Task Force-Afghanistan, Special Operations Command Central, and the United States Army.

== Personal life ==
Williams lives in North Carolina, with his wife Kate and two sons, Nolan and Barrett. Following his retirement from the United States Army in 2025 and his graduation from Texas A&M University with a Masters in Business Administration, Matt took a job within Decisive Point as a Partner, where he focuses on venture investment and advisory work with early stage companies advancing technologies that matter. Matt currently sits on the advisory board for the veteran nonprofit group, HunterSeven Foundation, as cancer prevention and early detection is an important aspect within Matts personal and professional history.
