= 3rd Special Forces Group (United States) =

3rd Special Forces Group (Airborne)
- 3rd Special Forces Group beret flash
- Active: 5 December 1963 – 1 December 1969; 1 Jul 1990–present
- Country: United States
- Branch: United States Army
- Type: Special operations forces
- Role: Primary tasks: Unconventional Warfare (UW); Foreign Internal Defense (FID); Direct Action (DA); Counter-Insurgency (COIN); Special Reconnaissance (SR); Counter-Terrorism (CT); Information Operations (IO); Counterproliferation of WMD (CP); Security Force Assistance (SFA)
- Size: 4 battalions
- Part of: 1st Special Forces Command
- Garrison/HQ: Fort Bragg, North Carolina
- Motto: "De Oppresso Liber"
- Engagements: Vietnam War Gulf War; Operation Uphold Democracy; War on terror: Operation Enduring Freedom; Operation Freedom's Sentinel; Iraq War

Insignia
- Former 3rd SFG(A) recognition bar, worn by non-special operations qualified soldiers—in lieu of a beret flash—from the 1960s to 1984

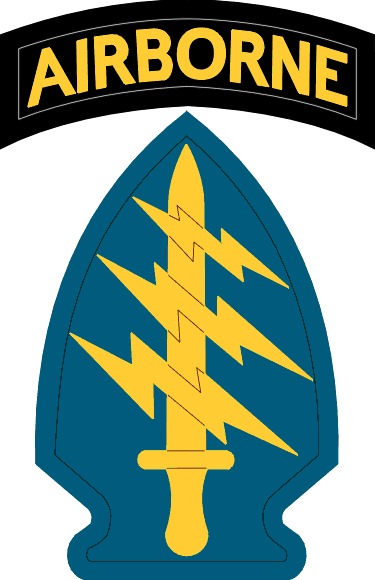
- 1st Special Forces Command (Airborne) shoulder sleeve insignia, worn by all 1st SFC(A) units

The 3rd Special Forces Group (Airborne) – abbreviated 3rd SFG (A) and often simply called 3rd Group – is an active duty United States Army Special Forces (SF) group which was active in the Vietnam Era (1963–69), deactivated, and then reactivated in 1990. 3rd Group is designed to deploy and execute nine doctrinal missions: unconventional warfare, foreign internal defense, direct action, counter-insurgency, special reconnaissance, counter-terrorism, information operations, counterproliferation of weapon of mass destruction, and security force assistance. The 3rd SFG (A) was primarily responsible for operations within the AFRICOM area of responsibility, as part of the Special Operations Command, Africa (SOCAFRICA). Its primary area of operations (AO) is now Africa as part of a 2015 SOCOM directive but 3rd Group has also been involved in the Caribbean and the Greater Middle East. The 3rd SFG (A) has seen extensive action in the war on terror and its members have distinguished themselves on the battlefield in Afghanistan.

== History ==
=== 1960s ===
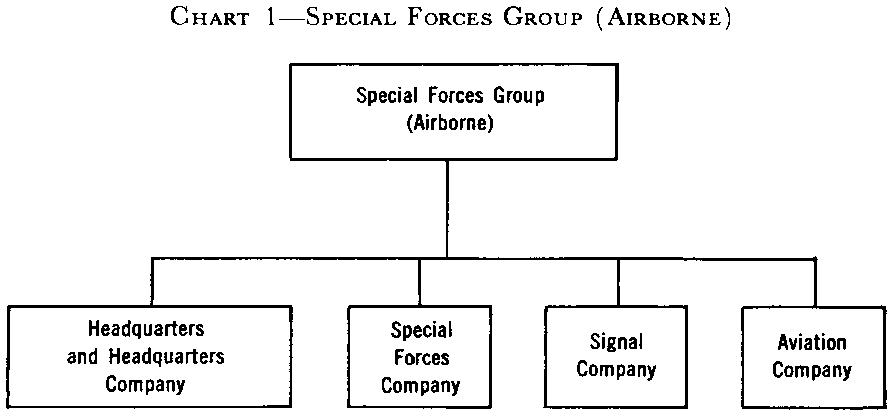
Special Forces Group organization in the Vietnam Era

3rd Group was first activated on 5 December 1963 at Fort Bragg, North Carolina. The four colors of the quadrants of 3rd Group's beret flash are derived from the flashes of the pre-existing SF units from which 3rd Group's members were initially drawn (hence its original motto: "From the Rest Comes the Best"). These colors are: yellow (1st SFG (A)), red (7th SFG (A)), black (5th SFG (A)), and white (Special Forces Training Group (A)). 3rd Group was originally oriented towards the Middle East and Africa during the 1960s. The unit trained the armed forces of Mali, Iraq, Ethiopia, the Congo, and Jordan – in addition to supporting the Gemini 6 and 7 space launches in 1965. 3rd Group also worked with the 5th SFG (A) in Vietnam. In 1966, 3rd Group transferred assumed control of the 403rd Army Security Agency Special Operations Detachment and the 19th PSYOP Company over to 5th Group. With the "Vietnamization" of the conflict, the 3rd SFG (A) was inactivated in 1969 and its members were transferred back to the other Special Forces Groups. One 3rd group officer who stayed on in South Vietnam—Major George W. Petrie—was first man on the ground in the Son Tay Raid (1970) and subsequently helped plan the Saigon evacuation (30 April 1975), becoming the last SF soldier to leave the country.

=== 1990s ===
The 3rd Special Forces Group was reactivated in 1990. Its AO initially consisted of the Caribbean and West Africa. New group members were drawn primarily from the 5th SFG (A). At the outbreak of the Gulf War, 3rd Group's only functioning battalion (1st BN) was deployed to Dhahran, Saudi Arabia, for three months. Its A-Teams carried out reconnaissance and sabotage missions into denied areas of Iraq and Kuwait. In February 1991, 3rd Group was tasked with the mission of securing and occupying the U.S. Embassy in Kuwait City. The 2nd BN and 3rd BN of 3rd Group were reactivated in 1991 and 1992, respectively. 3rd Group also took part in the restoration of democracy in Haiti in 1994. In the late '90s, 3rd Group helped train forces in Senegal, Uganda, Malawi, Mali, Ethiopia, and Trinidad and Tobago, among others.

=== 2000s ===
In the fall of 2000, the 3rd SFG (A) was involved in training and stabilization efforts in West Africa, dubbed "Operation Focus Relief" by the State Department; the training mission was geared towards combating the Revolutionary United Front.

Since 9/11, the 3rd SFG (A) has been heavily involved in Afghanistan and Central Asia. Two of 3rd Group's battalions spend roughly six months out of every twelve deployed to Afghanistan as part of Combined Joint Special Operations Task Force – Afghanistan. In 2008, ten members of ODA 3336 were awarded Silver Stars for combat action during the Battle of Shok Valley. It was the largest set of citations for a single battle since the Vietnam War. After the citations were read then-commander of United States Army Special Operations Command, Lieutenant General John F. Mulholland, Jr., stated:

As we have listened to these incredible tales, I am truly at a loss for words to do justice to what we have heard here, where do we get such men? … There is no finer fighting man on the face of the earth than the American soldier. And there is no finer American soldier than our Green Berets. If you saw what you heard today in a movie, you would shake your head and say, "That didn’t happen." But it does, every day.

Members of the 3rd SFG were involved in the 2003 invasion of Iraq. 26 soldiers from 3rd Group were given the task of securing a key crossroads near Debecka in Northern Iraq between the cities of Irbil and Kirkuk. If they succeeded, they would cut Highway 2, preventing the Iraqi army moving north into Kurdistan, and allow friendly forces to take the crucial Kirkuk oilfields. The 26 Green Berets were divided into two A-teams; ODA 391 and ODA 392, they were equipped with GMVs (Ground Mobility Vehicles), modified Humvees with M2 .50-caliber machine guns and Mark 19 Grenade launchers, that could travel a thousand miles without resupply. The ODAs conducted battle training in Fort Bragg, North Carolina and Fort Pickett, Virginia between October and December 2002. On 8 March 2003, the ODAs flew from Pope Air Force Base to Romania and on 26 March 2003 they infiltrated northern Iraq via a MC-130 Combat Talon landing at Al-Sulaymaniya, some 60 miles east of Kirkuk. In their first few days in Iraq they participated in Operation Viking Hammer and then on 1 April 2003, they moved to Irbil and onto a staging area where they linked up with ODA 044, 10th SFG and their Peshmerga allies. On 4 April 2003, they were given a new mission, code-named Northern Safari, which directed them to seize the Debecka intersection until relieved by the 173rd Airborne Brigade's artillery component, On 5 April, they moved into position to seize the intersection and then on 6 April they ran into Iraqi Army forces and the Battle of Debecka Pass ensued, resulting in an American and Peshmerga victory. The Special Forces secured the crossroads and endured two days of Iraqi artillery fire before moving into Kirkuk to secure the oil facilities to prevent their destruction by Iraqi forces.

=== 2010s–present ===
In October 2010, Staff Sergeant Robert James Miller was posthumously awarded the Medal of Honor. On 25 January 2008, Miller's team was ambushed during a combat reconnaissance patrol in Kunar Province near the Pakistan border. Miller's commander was seriously wounded within the first minutes of the attack. Wounded and under intense enemy fire, Miller pushed forward and laid down suppressive fire on multiple insurgent positions, which allowed his wounded commander to be pulled out of the line of fire and his teammates to safely reach cover. Miller single-handedly eliminated multiple insurgents before succumbing to his wounds.

The 1st Battalion, 3rd SFG (A) were awarded the Canadian Commander-in-Chief Unit Commendation on 23 May 2012, for their actions during Operation Medusa in 2006. The ceremony was presided by Major-General Charles Cleveland, the commander of USASOC, and the award presented by CEFCOM Commander Lieutenant-General Stuart Beare, on behalf of the Canadian Monarch and the Governor General of Canada. The 1st Battalion, 3rd SFG (A) is the first non-Canadian unit, and seventh overall, to receive this honour. The citation read:

During August and September 2006, the 1st Battalion, 3rd Special Forces Group (Airborne), United States Army, displayed extraordinary heroism and outstanding combat ability while battling insurgents in support of a Canadian-led operation in Afghanistan. After completing their initial objectives, they willingly engaged a much larger force to secure the Canadian Battle Group's flank and prevent the enemy from staging an effective counter-offensive. Outnumbered and facing a well-prepared enemy, they were relentless in their assault and eventually captured the position after days of intense fighting.

On 4 October 2017, 12 soldiers from the 3rd SFG and 30 Nigerien soldiers were ambushed in the Nigerien village of Tongo Tongo by forces of the Islamic State in the Greater Sahara. During the battle, four Americans and four Nigeriens were killed.

In 2023, a social media post drew attention for a Totenkopf patch worn on the helmet of one of the group's soldiers. A spokesperson for the group confirmed that the Nazi-inspired patch was formerly used by some elements of the group as an unofficial emblem, but use of that patch was banned in 2022 because of its connections to Nazi Germany. The patch was used before and during World War II by the 3rd SS Panzer Division, which engaged in a number of war crimes during World War II. In recent times, neo-Nazis and other white supremacists have used the Totenkopf as a hate symbol. In March 2024, the controversy resurfaced and drew media attention when an Instagram post from 20th Special Forces Group showed a soldier wearing a variant of the patch. Initially, a public affairs officer from 20th SFG denied the association, defending and downplaying the post, claiming the patch was a "3rd group team patch taken out of context," The Army initially made "conflicting statements" about the patch, before quickly deleting the post after receiving "hundreds of comments" of criticism, prompting an investigation. According to a USASOC spokesperson, "The use of symbols and patches depicting historic images of hate are not tolerated and a clear violation of our values," and that "We are aware of the situation and looking into the matter further."

== Organization ==
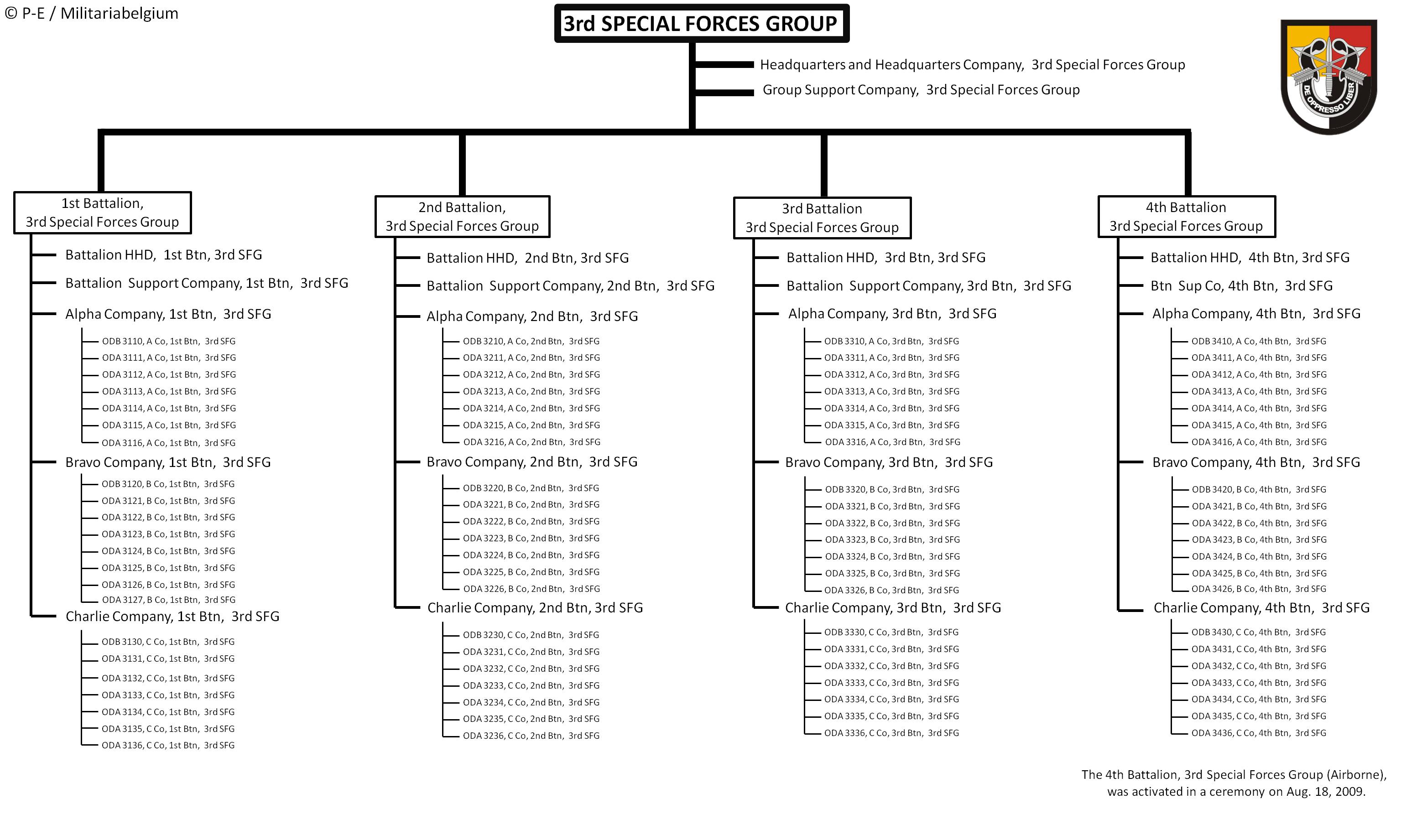
Current structure of the 3rd SFG (A)

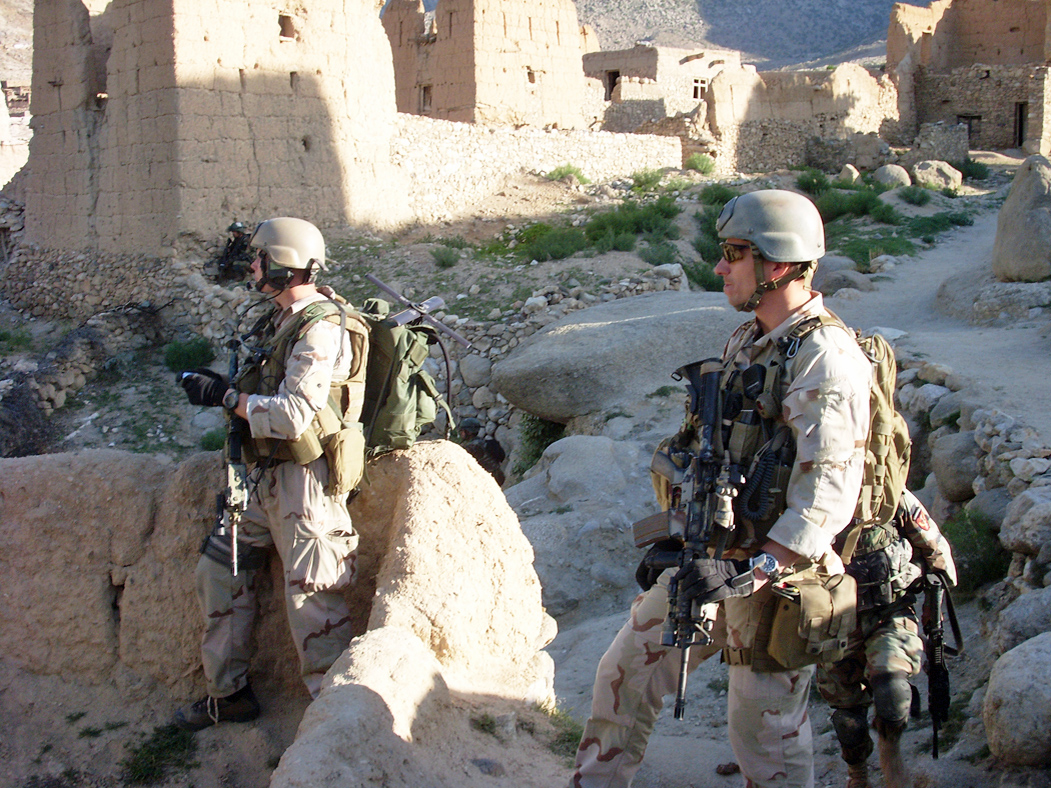
Members of ODA 3336 in Afghanistan's Shok Valley

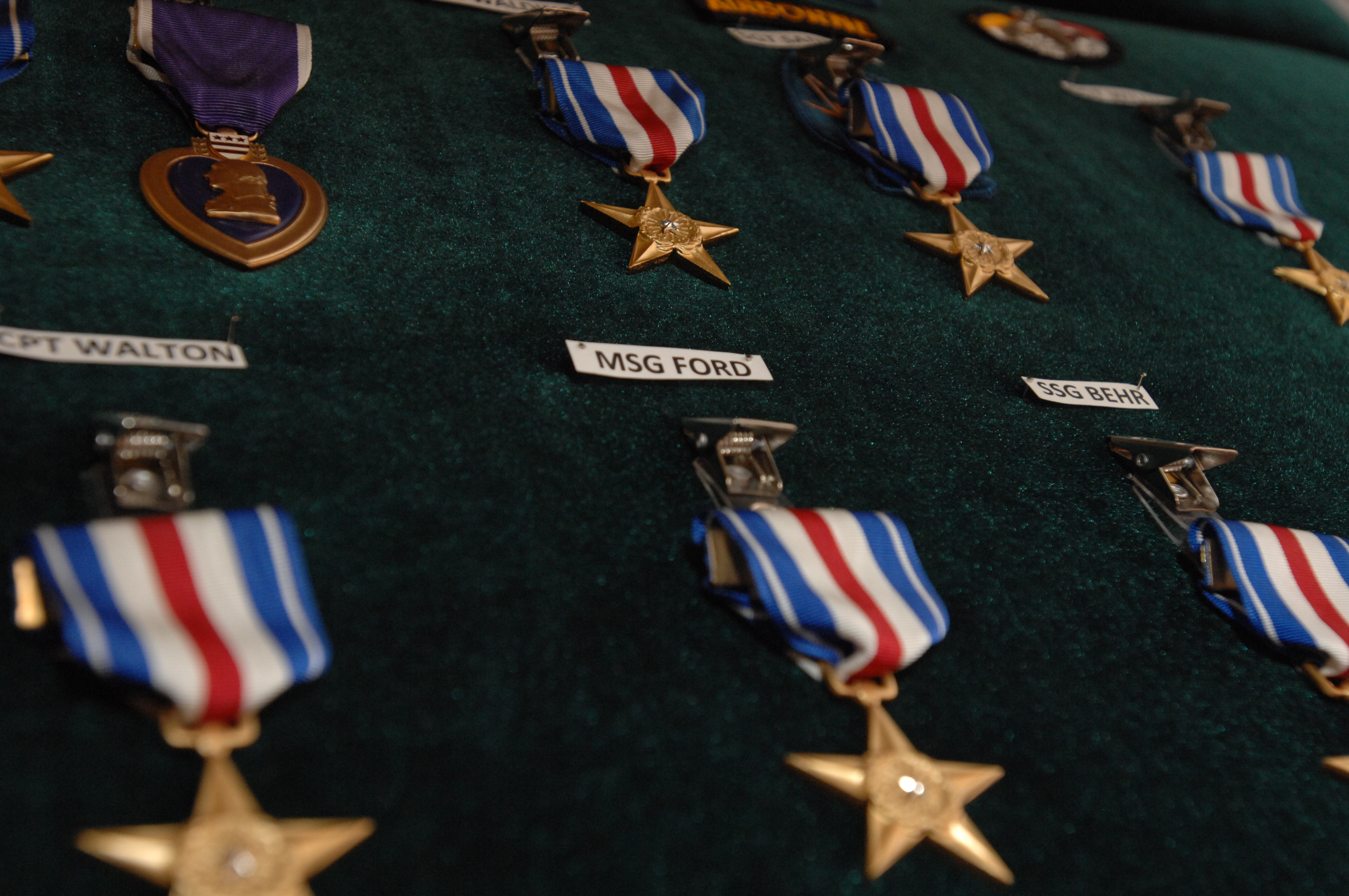
Medals awarded to 3rd SFG (A) operators.

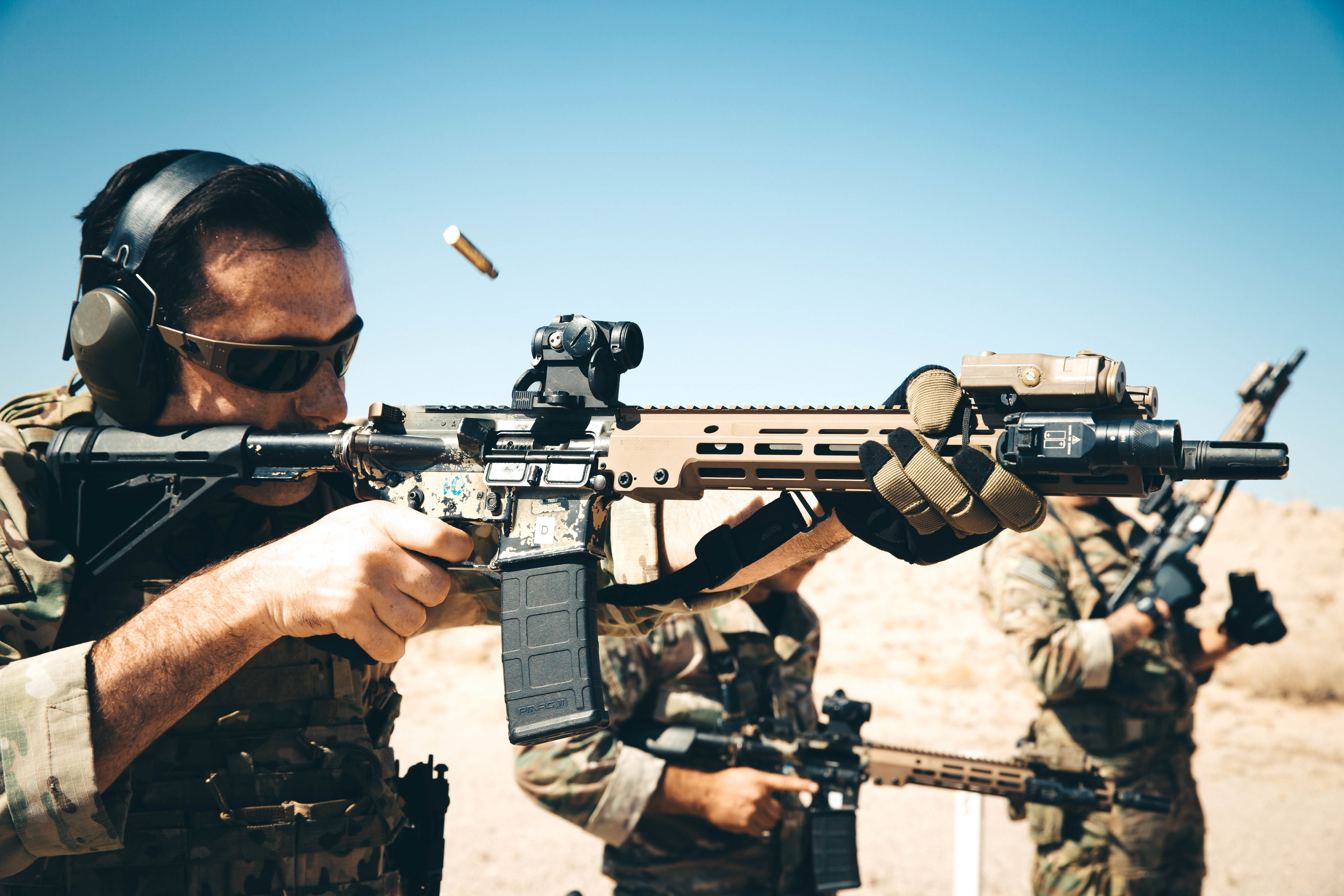
One of the 3rd SFG (A) operators used an Upper Receiver Group-Improved (URG-I) variant M4A1 carbine with a black Magpul STANAG magazine during training at Marine Corps Air Ground Combat Center, Twentynine Palms, California in 2019.

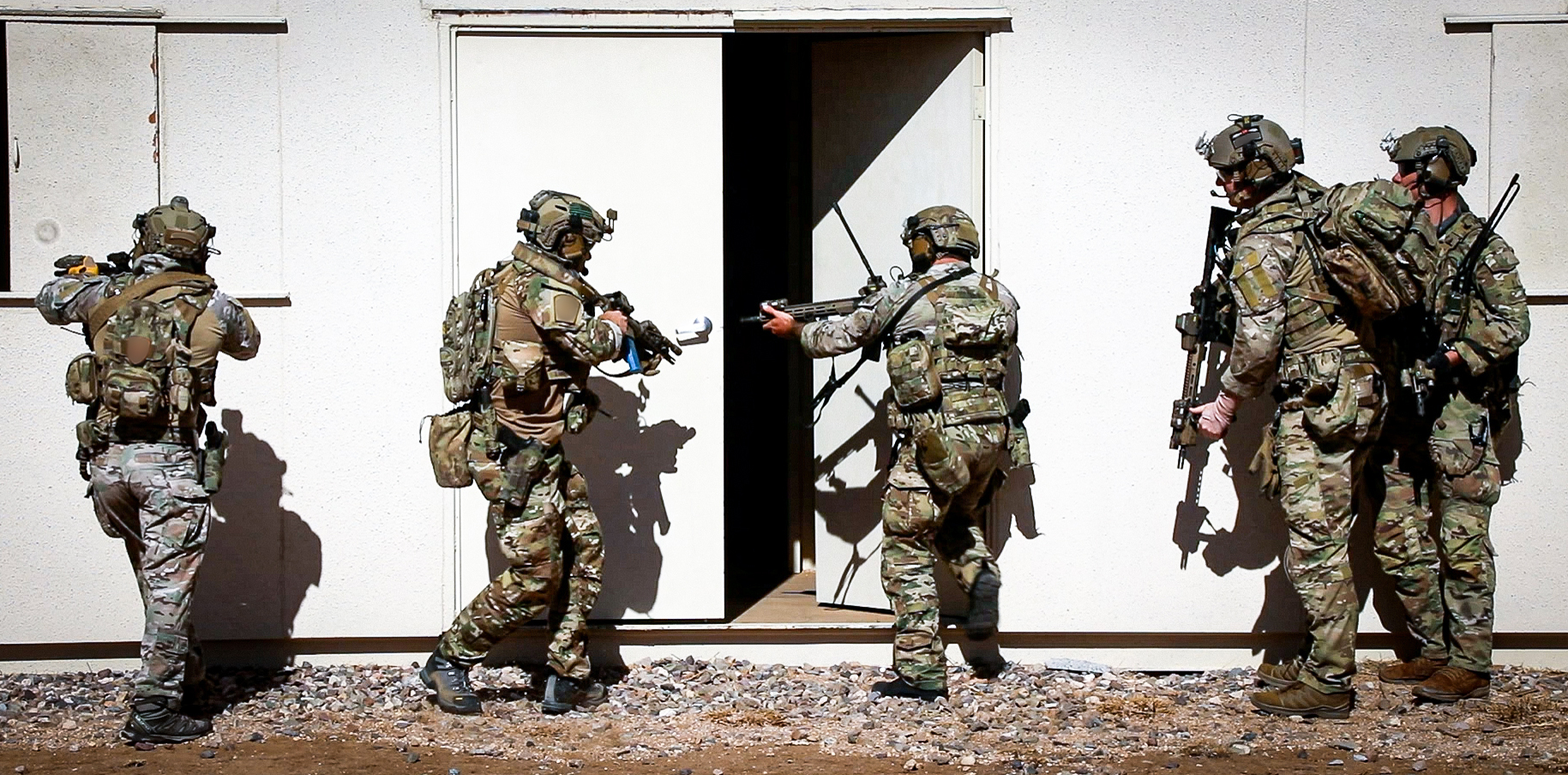
3rd Battalion, 3rd SFG (A) operators armed with URG-I variant M4A1 carbines having SOPMOD items conducted joint training with members of BORTAC (Border Patrol Tactical Unit) at Davis-Monthan AFB, Arizona in 2020.

== Notable officers and soldiers ==
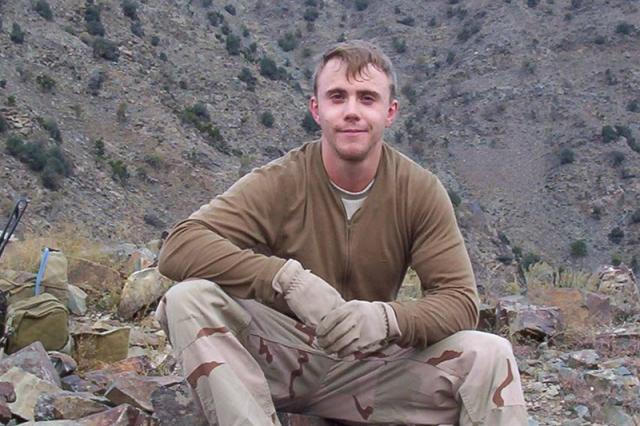
SSG Robert James Miller

- Staff Sergeant Raymond Allen Davis, civilian CIA contractor in diplomatic row with Pakistan
- Captain Daniel W. Eggers, killed by an IED, namesake of Camp Eggers, Afghanistan
- Sergeant First Class Jason Everman, musician best known for playing in grunge bands Nirvana and Soundgarden before enlisting in 1994
- Master Sergeant Stan Goff, political activist
- Captain Jeffrey MacDonald, MD, convicted in 1979 of murdering his wife and two children in 1970 while stationed at Fort Bragg
- Staff Sergeant Robert James Miller, posthumous Medal of Honor recipient
- Staff Sergeant Ronald J. Shurer, Medal of Honor recipient
- Sergeant First Class Christopher Speer, Soldier's Medal recipient, Delta Force medic, formerly with 3rd SFG, wounded in Khost Province, Afghanistan and later died at Ramstein Air Base, Germany
- Sergeant Major Matthew O. Williams, Medal of Honor recipient
