= Keith Adams (filmmaker) =

Australian filmmaker and adventurer

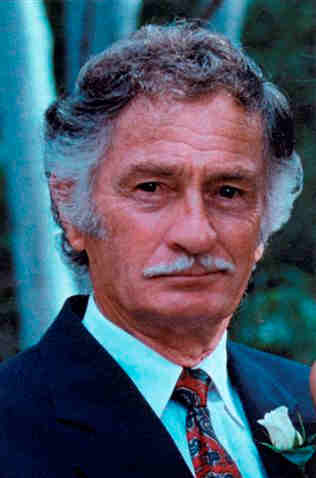
- Keith Adams in later life, c. 1990s
- Born: Keith Flexmore Adams; 8 September 1926; Scottsdale, Tasmania, Australia
- Died: 5 April 2012 (aged 85); Karrinyup, Western Australia
- Other names: Crocodile Safari Man
- Occupations: Filmmaker, adventurer, author, showman
- Years active: 1949–2012
- Notable work: Northern Safari (1956)

Keith Flexmore Adams (8 September 1926 – 5 April 2012) was an Australian filmmaker, adventurer, and author best known for his influential 1956 documentary Northern Safari. Often referred to as the "Crocodile Safari Man", Adams pioneered the self-funded Australian outback adventure documentary, establishing a template later adopted by adventurers such as the Leyland Brothers, Malcolm Douglas, Harry Butler, and Steve Irwin.

== Early life ==
Adams was born in Scottsdale, Tasmania, on 8 September 1926. He grew up during the Great Depression, an experience which shaped his lifelong self-reliance and resourcefulness. He later detailed these formative years in his memoir Crocodile Safari Man. After leaving Tasmania, Adams moved to Perth, Western Australia, where he worked as a mechanic.

== Northern Safari ==
In 1955, Adams undertook a 16,000 km (9,900 mi) expedition from Perth across Australia's remote deserts and northern regions to the Gulf of Carpentaria. Accompanied by his wife Audrey, his sister Margaret, and their fox terrier Tiger, the Adams' documented their six-month journey using a wind-up 16 mm Bolex H-16 camera loaded with Kodachrome film.

The film captured striking scenes, notably a 6.1 m (20 ft) salt-water crocodile being harpooned, hauled ashore, and skinned, with Adams explaining the hide's commercial value. The film's candid style and authentic portrayal of the Australian outback resonated strongly with audiences.

== Roadshow presentations ==
Adams independently financed and distributed Northern Safari by personally touring and screening the film. Using a method known as "four-walling", he hired town halls and suburban theatres, provided projectors, screens, and marketing materials, and performed live narration at each screening. His wife Audrey and sister Margaret assisted by selling tickets and souvenir programs. This innovative approach proved extremely successful, leading to extended cinema engagements, including a fifteen-week season at Sydney's Palace Theatre and a subsequent profit-sharing arrangement with Hoyts at Ashfield.

His meticulous and determined business practices occasionally brought him into direct competition with similar adventure-film roadshows. For example, during the 1980 Sydney release of Alby Mangels' successful documentary World Safari, Adams had already booked prime Sydney venues months in advance, leading to a clash between the two rival safaris. Despite substantial financial investment and promotional efforts from Mangels' team, Adams firmly refused to relinquish his booked venues. Both films ultimately proved highly successful, with Northern Safari grossing close to half a million dollars in Sydney alone, affirming Adams's reputation as a shrewd and effective showman who was not easily intimidated by competition.

Adams continued to tour the film nationally and internationally across New Zealand, South Africa, Rhodesia, the United Kingdom, Canada, and the United States over three decades.

== Later career and legacy ==
Adams spent decades documenting further expeditions into Australia's outback, solidifying his status as a pioneering figure in adventure documentary filmmaking. His approach to filming, editing, and distribution became a blueprint for later generations of filmmakers and adventurers. In 2000, Adams published his autobiography, Crocodile Safari Man, chronicling fifty years of Australian expeditions and adventures.

== Personal life ==
Adams was married to Audrey Adams, who was closely involved in his filmmaking and expeditions. Keith Adams died on 5 April 2012, aged 85, in Karrinyup, Western Australia.

== Filmography ==
Adams produced one feature-length film:

- Northern Safari (1956)

== Published works ==
Adams authored one book:

- Crocodile Safari Man: My Tasmanian Childhood in the Great Depression & 50 Years of Desert Safaris to the Gulf of Carpentaria 1949–1999 (2000)
