= Northern Safari =

- US poster
- Directed by: Keith Adams
- Written by: Keith Adams
- Produced by: Keith Adams
- Starring: Keith Adams, Audrey Adams, Margaret Adams
- Narrated by: Keith Adams
- Cinematography: Audrey Adams, Keith Adams, Margaret Adams
- Edited by: Keith Adams
- Distributed by: Self-distributed
- Release date: 1956
- Running time: 121 minutes (theatrical) / 90 minutes (original cut)
- Country: Australia
- Language: English

Northern Safari is a 1956 Australian documentary film produced, directed and narrated by adventurer Keith Adams. Shot on a family expedition from Perth to the Gulf of Carpentaria in 1955, it is widely regarded as Australia’s first feature-length nature-adventure documentary, a template later echoed by the Leyland Brothers, Malcolm Douglas, Harry Butler and Steve Irwin.

== Plot ==
The film opens in suburban Perth with Keith Adams loading a 1948 diesel-converted Buick Special and tender dinghy before rolling north onto dusty station tracks. Early sequences emphasise the car’s incongruity against a red, treeless horizon as it tows the aluminium boat past herds of feral camels and the wreck of an abandoned truck. The camera lingers on makeshift repairs: a fuel-tank gash is packed with spinifex resin while Adams explains the bush fix to the audience.

Crossing the Gibson Desert, the narrative slows to observe wildlife. Tiger the fox-terrier pursues emus, goannas and finally a column of meat ants that turn the tables on him. Adams then lifts a live funnel-web spider from the sand, calmly displaying its fangs to camera before returning it unharmed.

At Borroloola on the Gulf coast the party establishes a palm-fringed camp. Audrey and Margaret emerge each morning in immaculate pastel blouses and head-scarves, their neat attire contrasting sharply with the surrounding mudflats and smoke-blackened billies. The centre-piece sequence follows a 6.1 m (20 ft) salt-water crocodile that is harpooned from the dinghy, winched ashore with a hand-line and then expertly skinned while Adams explains the commercial value of its hide.

Further scenes show the Buick battling tidal creeks, Margaret reeling in a bronze whaler shark on heavy cord, and giant termite mounds used as look-outs by Tiger. The journey closes with coastal vistas south of Broome where the battered car drives the intertidal flats against a sunset backdrop before the family boards a ferry for the final leg back to Perth.

== Production ==
Filming grew out of a six-month expedition that left Perth in April 1955 and looped 16,000 km (9,900 mi) through the Gibson Desert, the Great Sandy Desert, the Kimberley and the Gulf of Carpentaria before returning south along the east coast.

Keith Adams replaced the Buick Special’s original petrol engine with a Perkins diesel, added a seventy-gallon auxiliary fuel tank, heavy-duty springs and ten-ply desert tyres, and strapped a collapsible aluminium dinghy to the roof. The family carried spare parts, dry stores and their fox-terrier Tiger, relying on bush ingenuity whenever the car or boat failed.

All images were captured on a clock-work 16 mm Bolex H-16 loaded with Kodachrome reversal stock. The Adams' collectively shot about 14,000 ft (4,300 m) of film (just over four hours of footage) and recorded location sound on a portable wire recorder for later synchronisation.

Back in Perth he edited a silent ninety-minute assembly which he screened locally with live narration. To reach commercial cinemas he expanded the material to 121 minutes, created an optical soundtrack in a Sydney laboratory and struck a single 35 mm colour print while retaining the 16 mm reels for his touring roadshow.

== Distribution ==
Adopting a form of four-walling, Adams personally hired town halls and suburban cinemas, supplied his own 16 mm and 35 mm projectors, erected a portable screen and handled all publicity, keeping the box-office takings after venue rental. Each screening featured Adams on stage delivering an improvised narration and performing the theme tune, while Audrey and Margaret Adams sold tickets and souvenir programmes to patrons queuing outside. Pioneering word-of-mouth success carried the film from regional circuits to a fifteen-week season at the Palace Theatre in Sydney, followed by a split-profit engagement at Hoyts’ Ashfield cinema after company scouts saw the show at Hawthorn Town Hall. Over the next three decades the roadshow toured every Australian state and extended internationally to New Zealand, South Africa, Rhodesia, the United Kingdom, Canada and the United States, where Adams continued to provide live commentary in venues ranging from community halls to first-run city theatres.

=== Later Re-releases and Audio Track ===
Although the expedition was filmed in 1955, early screenings featured Adams providing live microphone commentary in theatres. In the mid-1970s, to facilitate television broadcast and commercial distribution, Adams recorded a permanent narration track and sound effects in his Scarborough, Perth home. For this re-release, a new introduction was filmed in suburban Perth in the 1970s to set up the documentary, creating a chronological mix of 1950s expedition footage and 1970s backdrops.

== Reception ==
Contemporary press praised the film’s authenticity and “unrehearsed excitement”; over 70,000 Victorians saw it in its first Melbourne run alone. Critics such as The Bulletin highlighted its “rough edges” as evidence of honesty. Some viewers objected to its graphic animal killings, prompting letters to newspapers in the early 1970s.

== Legacy ==
Northern Safari is preserved by the National Film and Sound Archive as a “foundational home movie that went professional”. Scholars position it at the genesis of Australia’s safari-adventure screen tradition. Its DIY model influenced the Leyland Brothers, Malcolm Douglas and later wildlife personalities, while its crocodile sequences informed Greg McLean’s 2007 horror film Rogue. A DVD edition remains available from Adams’s estate.
