= Battle of Shok Valley =

Joint US–Afghan raid in 2008

- Part of the War in Afghanistan (2001–2021)
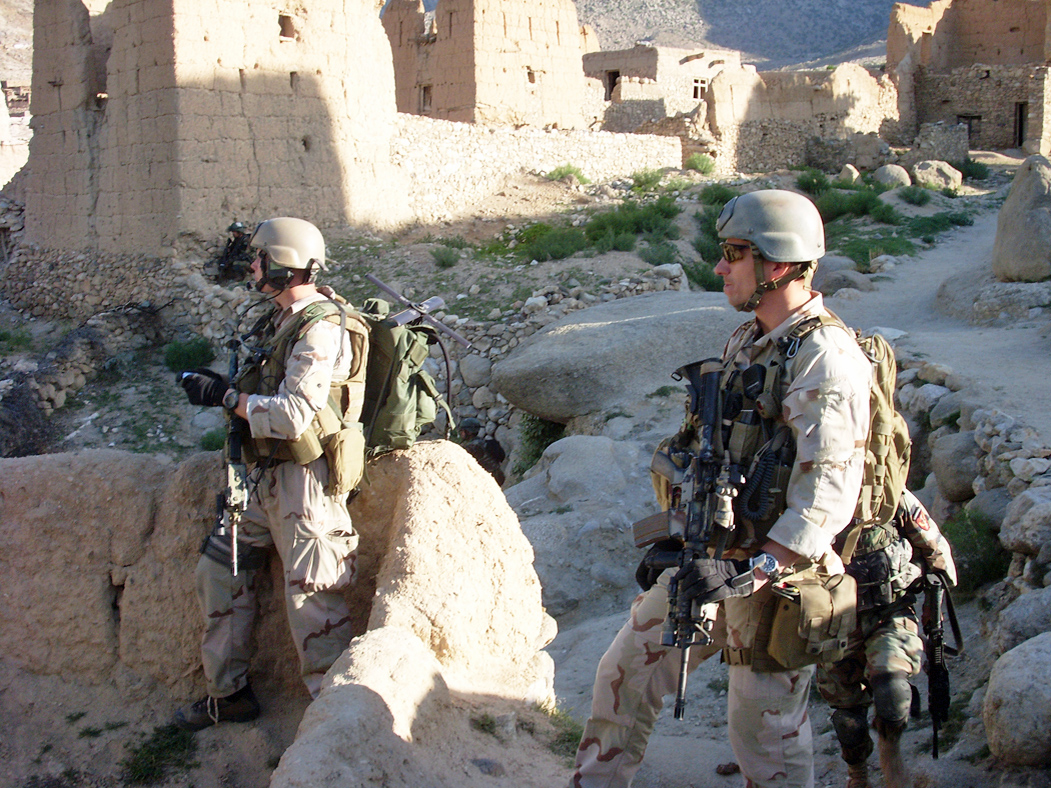
- Members of ODA 3336 in the Shok Valley
Date	6 April 2008
Location	Shok Valley, Nuristan Province, Afghanistan
Result	U.S./Afghan failure to capture Gulbuddin Hekmatyar

Belligerents
United States; Islamic Republic of Afghanistan	Hezb-e-Islami Gulbuddin Supported by: Pakistan (Denied by Pakistan)

Commanders and leaders
Capt. Kyle Walton; MSG Scott Ford	Gulbuddin Hekmatyar

Units involved
Task Force Bushmaster: ODA 3336, 3rd Special Forces Group; 1st Company, 201st Commando Battalion, ANA Commando Brigade	Local and foreign Hezb-e-Islami Gulbuddin fighters

Strength
15 soldiers ≈100 soldiers	≈200 initial force ≈50–200 reinforcements

Casualties and losses
6 wounded, local interpreter killed 2 killed, several wounded	Unknown

The Battle of Shok Valley, also known as Operation Commando Wrath, was a joint U.S.-Afghan raid designed to kill or capture Gulbuddin Hekmatyar, the leader of Hezb-e-Islami Gulbuddin (HIG) in the Shok Valley of Nuristan Province of Afghanistan on 6 April 2008. Ten soldiers belonging to U.S Army special forces and their combat cameraman were awarded the Silver Star for bravery, the greatest number of such awards for a single battle since the Vietnam War. In 2018, Special Forces medic Ronald J. Shurer's Silver Star was upgraded to the Medal of Honor for his actions during the battle. In 2019, Special Forces weapons sergeant Matthew O. Williams's Silver Star was upgraded to the Medal of Honor for his actions during the battle. In addition SrA Zachary Rhyner, ODA 3336's attached Air Force Combat Controller, was awarded the Air Force Cross.

== Insertion ==
The battle plan called for the Afghan commandos led by American Special Forces soldiers to be inserted into the valley via helicopter. From there they would move on foot to the terraced slopes around the fortified town and take the HIG forces by surprise. The coalition's CH-47 Chinook helicopters were unable to land so their soldiers were forced to jump from the hovering helicopters. Due to the austere and barren nature of the valley, HIG forces immediately spotted the incoming U.S. and ANA forces and had several minutes to set up ambush positions.

== Battle ==
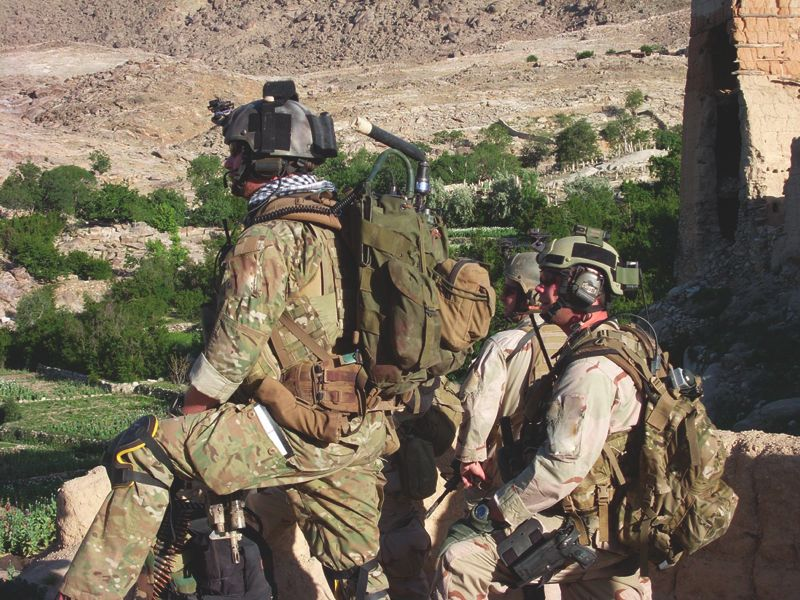
Special Forces soldiers from ODA 3336 and AF CCT Zachary Rhyner in Shok Valley

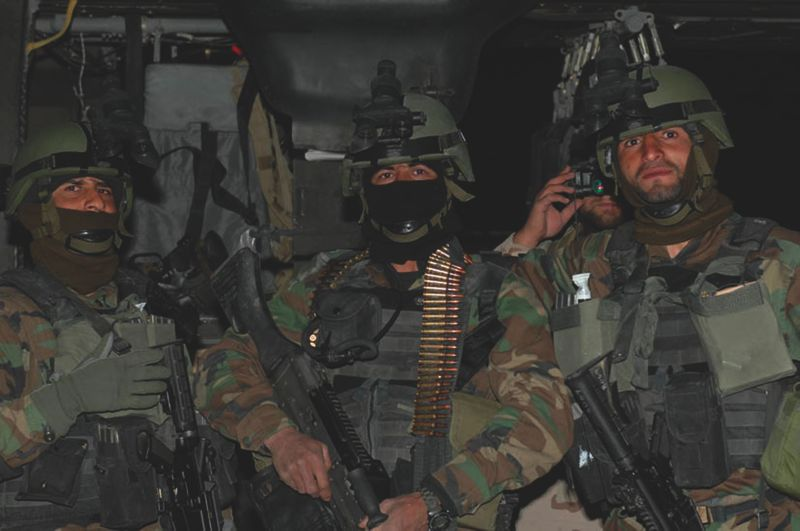
Members of the Afghan 201st Commando Kanak, two months before the battle

Upon attempting to infiltrate the stronghold along a sheer-sided agricultural terrace, Staff Sergeant Luis Morales was the first to observe armed insurgents moving along the ridge and opened the first salvo of automatic fire on the enemy. The unit came under heavy fire from HIG rocket-propelled grenade (RPG) and machine-gun positions. The initial salvo of machine gun fire was aimed at the command element of the American forces. Immediately, the unit's interpreter was killed and one of the Special Forces communications sergeants, SGT Dillon Behr, was badly wounded in the pelvis and left forearm. Now pinned down, the U.S. and ANA forces responded with small arms and sniper fire. After an Afghan commando was incapacitated while attempting to render aid to the wounded and pinned communications sergeant, the ODA's combat cameraman, Specialist Michael Carter, ran through the open to recover the wounded soldier while the element's commanding officer, Captain Kyle Walton, provided cover fire. The two then switched roles in providing cover in order to recover the second wounded soldier. While the lead elements engaged HIG positions, Walton knew he would need close air support and so again provided cover while Carter ran out to recover the unit's communications gear.

With communications restored, SrA Zachary Rhyner, the Air Force Combat Controller attached to the ODA, began directing close air support and air strikes from orbiting F-15E Strike Eagles and AH-64 Apache attack helicopters onto HIG targets. Rhyner used the F-15s as observations platforms, their avionics systems acting as reconnaissance tools to maintain visual on enemy positions and movements. While the air strikes were hitting the fortified town, a massive explosion occurred in one of the buildings, causing a temporary lull in the fighting. The rear elements of the Special Forces detachment used this as an opportunity to maneuver into new positions and begin sniper fire on HIG heavy weapons positions. While providing first aid to SGT Behr, the ODA's intelligence sergeant, SSG Luis Morales, was struck in the thigh. Morales applied a tourniquet and returned to giving care. A second shot went through Morales' boot at the ankle blowing out bone and severing the achilles (Morales would later lose his foot). In the ensuing fire fight, SGT John Wayne Walding had his leg nearly severed by a single shot. Walding applied a tourniquet to his leg, autoinjection of morphine and folded his mangled leg upward into his crotch and tied two bootlaces to his belt in order to retain his ability to move and shoot.

By this time, the F-15 overhead reported a massive reinforcement element moving in the valley. With daylight running out, several wounded soldiers, ammunition running short and the weather beginning to turn, the ODA began to scout an exfiltration route to an extraction zone. Carter and the ODA's Team Sergeant, MSG Scott Ford, were scouting a route down the sheer terraces when Ford was hit twice by sniper fire, one of the shots nearly severing his left arm. As the combined Afghan and American forces withdrew down the mountain, the ODA's sniper, SSG Seth Howard, commanding officer and their combat cameraman remained behind to collect or destroy weapons that could not be carried. The ODA sniper, SSG Howard, covered the last of the withdraw before himself making his way to the extraction zone.

In all, the battle lasted for seven hours. The primary target of the action, Gulbuddin Hekmatyar, was not captured. According to Rhyner's Air Force Cross citation, over the course of the battle he directed over 50 attack runs using a total of 4,570 cannon rounds, nine Hellfire missiles, 162 rockets, a dozen 500-pound bombs and one 2,000-pound bomb.

Special Forces medic Ronald J. Shurer and weapons sergeant Matthew O. Williams were awarded the Medal of Honor for their actions during the battle. Eight other Special Forces Soldiers of ODA 3336 were awarded Silver Stars for their actions. The story of the battle is the subject of the book No Way Out: A Story of Valor in the Mountains of Afghanistan (ISBN 9780425245262).

== Popular culture ==
Episode 3 of Season 1 of the National Geographic Channel series No Man Left Behind is about this battle and aired on July 12, 2016.
