= Languages of Afghanistan =

- Official: Pashto, Dari
- Regional: Uzbek, Turkmen, Balochi, Pashayi, Nuristani, Pamiri
- Minority: Arabic, Gujari, Urdu, Kyrgyz, Tajik, Sindhi
- Foreign: English (c. 6%)
- Signed: Afghan Sign Language
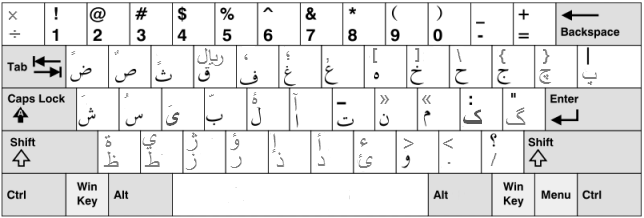
- Keyboard layout: ISIRI 9147

Afghanistan is a linguistically diverse nation with upwards of 40 distinct spoken languages. Dari and Pashto serve as the two main official languages. Dari, historically serving as the region’s lingua franca, is a shared language between the country's different ethnic groups. While Pashto is the dominant first language in the southern and eastern regions of the country, it is primarily spoken within its own ethnic areas.

The country's two main official languages, Dari and Pashto, are also sister languages, as both are Iranian languages and are part of the larger Indo-European language family. The third largest language, Uzbek, is a Turkic language and is sister to neighboring Turkmen. The Turkic languages, along with Balochi, Pashayi, Nuristani, and Pamiri, are the third official languages in areas where the majority speaks them.

Dari is spoken by over 75% of the population in Afghanistan, followed by Pashto (48%), Uzbek (11%), English (6%), Turkmen (3%), Urdu (3%), Pashayi (1%), Nuristani (1%), Arabic (1%), and Balochi (1%) (2020 est).

Minor languages include: Ashkunu, Gujari, Kamkata-vari, Wasi-wari, Tregami, Kalasha-ala, Pamiri (Shughni, Munji, Ishkashimi, and Wakhi), Brahui, Arabic, Pashai, Kyrgyz, and Punjabi. In Afghanistan the Indo Aryan languages like Sindhi, Gujari, Urdu, and Punjabi are spoken by 24,000, 18,850, 15,990, and 12,200 respectively. Linguist Harald Haarmann believes that Afghanistan is home to more than 40 minor languages with around 200 different dialects.

== Overview ==
Many local languages are dialects or endangered. (Note: Many of Afghanistan's languages are quite small, with many being on the verge of extinction. See § Endangered languages) Dari, a variant of Persian, acts as a shared language between multiple ethnic groups in the country; it has historically served as a lingua franca between different groups in the region, and is the most widely understood language in the country. (Note: See Languages of Afghanistan § Overview)

The Dari language functions as the nation's lingua franca and is the native tongue of several of Afghanistan's ethnic groups including the Tajiks, Hazaras, and Aimaqs. Pashto is the native tongue of the Pashtuns, the dominant ethnic group in Afghanistan. Due to Afghanistan's multi-ethnic character, multilingualism is a common phenomenon.

The exact figures about the size and composition of the various ethnolinguistic groups are unavailable since no systematic census has been held in Afghanistan in decades. The table below displays estimates of the major languages spoken in Afghanistan per sample statistics:

Languages of Afghanistan
Language		Recent estimates			Pre-1992 estimates	
Language		L1	L2	L1 + L2	L1	L2
Dari (Note: incl. Eastern, Kabuli, Hazaragi & Aimaqi)		33%		77%	25–35%	
Pashto (Note: incl. Northern and Southern)		40–55%	10–28%	48%	50–55%	<10%
Turkic languages (Note: incl. Uzbek, Turkmen, Kazakh)	Uzbek	8.8%		11%	11%	
Turkic languages	Turkmen	1.9%		3%	11%	
Turkic languages	other				11%	
other indigenous languages (Note: incl. Pashayi, Balochi, Nuristani, Brahui, Pamir, Gujari)	Balochi	0.9%		1%	4%	
other indigenous languages	Pashayi	0.9%	1%		4%	
other indigenous languages	Nuristani	0.9%	1%		4%	
other indigenous languages	other	0.9%			4%	
other non-indigenous languages	English	–	6%		unknown	
other non-indigenous languages	Urdu	–	3%		unknown	
other non-indigenous languages	Arabic	–	1%		unknown	
note: data represent most widely spoken languages; shares sum to more than 100% because there is much bilingualism in the country and because respondents were allowed to select more than one language note: the Turkic languages Uzbek and Turkmen, as well as Balochi, Pashayi, Nuristani, and Pamiri are the third official languages in areas where the majority speaks them

Statistics vary considerably from source to source, the amount of total Dari (L1+L2) speakers tends to be the most consistent (77-80%). Between sources the amount of L1 speakers of Pashto and Dari vary considerably. With Encyclopedia Britannica estimating that roughly 1/2 of the population of Afghanistan speaks Dari natively, and "more than" 2/5 of Afghanistan speaking Pashto natively. While estimating a lower amount of native Pashto speakers then other sources, Britannica estimates that roughly 20% of the population spoke Pashto as a second language (an estimate higher that most other sources). Britannica also notes that many Pashtuns (particularly in urban areas) speak Dari as their first language, so the quantity of first language speakers is not a reliable indication of ethnicity. Other sources may give higher estimates for L1 Pashto speakers but lower estimates for L2 speakers, and may give varying estimates for Dari depending on whether regional varieties of Dari such as Hazaragi and Aimaqi are counted as languages or dialects. Encyclopedia Iranica estimates that 50-55% of Afghanistan speak Pashto as their native language, but estimates few second language speakers (no estimate was given, only that the amount of L2 speakers was "less than 10%"). Iranica also estimated 25% of Afghanistan natively speaking Dari but also categorized varieties of Persian spoken in central Afghanistan as different languages from Dari, and gave no estimates to the percentage of non-Dari Persian speakers. Iranica also made no reference to how many ethnic Pashtuns spoke Dari as their first language.

A sizeable population in Afghanistan, especially in Kabul, can also speak and understand Urdu due to the mass migration of Afghan refugees during the Soviet–Afghan War.

== Language policy ==
The national official languages of the country are Dari and Pashto, first established by the 1964 Constitution of Afghanistan. Dari is the most widely spoken language of Afghanistan's languages and acts as a lingua franca for the country. In 1980, other regional languages were granted official status in the regions where they are the language of the majority. This policy was codified in the 2004 Constitution of Afghanistan, which established Uzbek, Turkmen, Balochi, Pashayi, Nuristani, and Pamiri as official languages in areas where they are spoken by a majority of the population. Officially, the Taliban government since 2021 has retained the national co-official status of Dari and Pashto as well as the regional status of ethnic minority languages. However, the Taliban have been accused of restricting the use of Dari and ethnic minority languages including Uzbek, in favor of Pashto.

== Language families ==
Afghanistan language families
language	percent
Iranic	85.4%
Turkic	10.7%
Other (Nuristani, Indo Aryan, Dravidian)	3.9%

Since Afghanistan is predominantly located on the Iranian plateau, the majority of spoken languages belong to the family of Iranic languages. Turkic languages are spoken sparsely at the northern intersection of the plateau with Central Asia. Similarly, Nuristani languages, Indo-Aryan languages and Dravidian languages are spoken sparsely at some regions where the plateau intersects with the Indian subcontinent.

== Endangered languages ==
Until 2004, Dari and Pashto were the only languages promoted by the government. Though policy has since changed, it has still harmed many minority languages of the country. The table below shows endangered languages spoken in Afghanistan that are recognized by UNESCO. UNESCO recognizes 23 endangered languages in Afghanistan, 12 of which are exclusively spoken in Afghanistan and one that has gone extinct after UNESCO's survey.

Language	UNESCO status	Language group	Language family	Native to	Speakers (all countries)
Ashkun	Definitely endangered	Nuristani (Indo-Iranian)	Indo-European	Afghanistan (exclusively)	40,000 (2011)
Brahui	Vulnerable	Northern Dravidian	Dravidian	Afghanistan, Pakistan	2,864,400 (2018)
Central Asian Arabic	Definitely endangered	Semitic	Afro-Asiatic	Afghanistan, Iran, Tajikistan, Uzbekistan	6,000 (2003)
Gawar-Bati	Definitely endangered	Indo-Aryan (Indo-Iranian)	Indo-European	Afghanistan, Pakistan	9,500 (1992)
Kamkata-vari	Definitely endangered	Nuristani	Indo-European	Afghanistan, Pakistan	40,000 (2017)
Moghol	Moribund^{(i)}	Moghol^{(ii)}	Mongolic	Afghanistan (exclusively)	200 (2003)^{(iii)}
Munji	Severely endangered	Iranian (Indo-Iranian)	Indo-European	Afghanistan (exclusively)	5,300 (2008)
Nangalami	Severely endangered	Indo-Aryan	Indo-European	Afghanistan (exclusively)	5,000 (1994)
Ormuri	Definitely endangered	Iranian	Indo-European	Afghanistan, Pakistan	6,000 (2004)
Parachi	Definitely endangered	Iranian	Indo-European	Afghanistan (exclusively)	3,500 (2009)
Parya	Severely endangered	Indo-Aryan	Indo-European	Afghanistan, Tajikistan, Uzbekistan	2,600 (No Date)^{(iv)}
Pashayi	Vulnerable	Indo-Aryan	Indo-European	Afghanistan (exclusively)	400,000 (2011)
Rushani	Definitely endangered	Iranian	Indo-European	Afghanistan, Tajikistan	18,000 (1990)
Savi	Definitely endangered	Indo-Aryan	Indo-European	Afghanistan (exclusively)	9,000 (2017)
Sanglechi	Severely endangered	Iranian	Indo-European	Afghanistan, Tajikistan	2,200 (2009)
Shughni	Vulnerable	Iranian	Indo-European	Afghanistan, Tajikistan	75,000 (1990)
Shumashti	Severely endangered	Indo-Aryan	Indo-European	Afghanistan (exclusively)	1,000 (1994)
Tirahi	Moribund^{(i)}	Indo-Aryan	Indo-European	Afghanistan (exclusively)	100 (undated)
Tregami	Severely endangered	Nuristani	Indo-European	Afghanistan (exclusively)	3,500 (2011)
Kalasha-Ala	Definitely endangered	Nuristani	Indo-European	Afghanistan (exclusively)	12,000 (2011)
Wakhi	Definitely endangered	Iranian	Indo-European	Afghanistan, China, Pakistan, Tajikistan	58,000 (2012)
Wasi-Wari	Definitely endangered	Nuristani	Indo-European	Afghanistan (exclusively)	8,000 (2011)
Wotapuri-Katarqalai	Extinct (no living speakers left)	Indo-Aryan	Indo-European	Afghanistan (formerly)	0

- ^(i) lit. "verge of death" Language has so few speakers, it is unlikely to survive unless immediate action is taken to preserve it
- ^(ii) Moghol is the only language in its branch
- ^(iii) Possibly Extinct
- ^(iv) Language has died or gone extinct in Afghanistan, but survives elsewhere.

== See also ==
- Demographics of Afghanistan
- Ethnic groups in Afghanistan
- Turkic people in Afghanistan
