= Ruki sound law =

Proto-Indo-European sound law

The ruki sound law, also known as the ruki rule or iurk rule, is a historical sound change that took place in the satem branches of the Indo-European language family, namely in Balto-Slavic, Armenian, and Indo-Iranian. According to this sound law, an original *s changed to *š (a sound similar to English ⟨sh⟩) after the consonants *r, *k, *g, *gʰ and the semi-vowels *w (*u̯) and *y (*i̯), as well as the syllabic allophones *r̥, *i, and *u:

*s > *š / {*r, *w, *K, *y} _

Specifically, the initial stage involves the retraction of the coronal sibilant *s after semi-vowels, *r, or a velar consonant *k, *g or *gʰ. In the second stage, leveling of the sibilant system resulted in retroflexion (cf. Sanskrit ष [ʂ] and Proto-Slavic), and later retraction to velar *x in Slavic and some Middle Indic languages. This rule was first formulated by Holger Pedersen, and it is sometimes known as Pedersen's law, although this term is also applied to another sound law concerning stress in the Balto-Slavic languages.

The name ruki comes from the sounds (r, u, K, i) which triggered the sound change. The law is stated as a mnemonic rule because the word руки (ruki) means 'hands, arms' in Russian, or is the genitive singular form ('of the hand') of рука (compare rule of thumb).

== Applications to language groups ==
The rule was originally formulated for Slavic languages. It was later proposed to be valid in some degree for all satem languages, and exceptionless for the Indo-Iranian languages. (There appears to be one exception at least in some Nuristani languages, however.) In Baltic and Albanian, it is limited or affected to a greater or lesser extent by other sound laws. Nevertheless, it has to have been universal in these branches of the IE languages, and the lack of Slavic reflexes before consonants is due rather to their merger with the reflexes of other sibilants.

=== Slavic languages ===
In Slavic languages the process is regular before a vowel, but it does not take place before consonants. The final result is the voiceless velar fricative *x, which is even more retracted than the *š. This velar fricative changed back into *š before a front vowel or the palatal approximant *y.

Examples:

- PIE *h₂sowsós > Proto-Balto-Slavic *saušás > Proto-Slavic *sȗxъ "dry"
- PIE *pers- "to sprinkle, spatter" > Proto-Balto-Slavic *paršás > Proto-Slavic *pȏrxъ "dust"

=== Indo-Iranian languages ===
In Indo-Iranian *r and *l merged, and the change worked even after the new sound; e.g. Avestan karš-, Sanskrit कर्षति kárṣati 'to plough' < PIE *kʷels-. This has been cited as evidence by many scholars as an argument for the later influence of Iranian languages on Proto-Slavic. There are obvious drawbacks in the theory. First, the two sounds must have been very close (r or l), so that both could have triggered the change in Indo-Iranian. Second, there are no real examples of this change working in Slavic, and it is also doubtful that only this change (ruki) and no other such change of sibilants (e.g. *s > h) was borrowed into Slavic.

The syllabic laryngeal *H̥ becomes *i in Proto-Indo-Iranian, and this also triggered ruki.

A later extension of ruki was particular to the Iranian languages: *s, *z shift to *š, *ž also after the labial stops *p, *b, including even secondary *s from Proto-Indo-Iranian *ć < PIE *ḱ.

==== Nuristani ====
The ruki rule also displays a rather different behavior in Nuristani, however recent research on the inherited layer of the Nuristani lexicon has revealed further details on the ruki law pointing to a different conclusion.

- The reflex of the Proto-Indo-European sequences *tḱ and *ḱs is Proto-Nuristani *ċċ, reflected in all Nuristani languages as ċ (pronounced [t͡s]), different to that of plain *ḱ > *ċ (ċ in most Nuristani languages, s in Ashkun and z in Prasun), thus in this context there is no evidence of the operation of ruki. For example, the word for "bear", reflecting Proto-Indo-European *h₂ŕ̥tḱos (Sanskrit ṛ́kṣa "bear", Avestan arṣ̌a) shows a dental affricate in most Nuristani languages, such as Ashkun and Katë iċ, and Nuristani Kalasha oċ, but Prasun has itru with an apparently irregular reflex.
- Proto-Indo-European sequences *ks and *kʷs appear to have become c̣ in modern Nuristani. Thus Proto-Indo-European *ksurós "razor" is reflected as kṣurá in Sanskrit, but c̣uři "sickle" in the Southeastern Katë dialect. However, this is explained by Halfmann as a sound development found in borrowings from Indo-Aryan (in this case from Indo-Aryan kṣurikā), and is in no way indicative of the inherited reflex, which appears to be a retracted sibilant yielding š in Katë and Nuristani Kalasha, and ṣ in Prasun. One example of the inherited reflex is *ksen- "to card wool" > *(wi-)kšan- > Northeastern Katë višn- and Prasun -ṣn-.
- Various cases where ruki failed to operate after *i and *u in Nuristani exist. Hegedűs notes that these all seem to trace back to PIE etyma where the *us and *is sequences were earlier *uHs and *iHs, meaning the laryngeals seem to have blocked the operation of ruki. For example, PIE *múh₂s "mouse" > Sanskrit mū́ṣ, Avestan mūš, but Northeastern Katë musë, Prasun müs, while Nuristani Kalasha pusa is of dubious etymology on account of the different initial consonant, and Ashkun moṣ shows the Indo-Aryan reflex, probably due to borrowing. However, examples such as Proto-Indo-European *dowséh₂ "evening" > Sanskrit doṣā́ show s in Katë dus and Prasun wulus, both meaning "yesterday". However, the apparent application of ruki after *i, such as PIE *wisós "poison" > Katë viš, also occurs before *i, as in PIE *-si "second-person singular verbal ending" > Katë -š. This is therefore related to palatalization near *i, which is cross-linguistically common and is therefore separate from the actual ruki rule.
- Proto-Indo-European *rs and *ls merge into modern Nuristani ṣ, thus after *r we do actually see proper ruki-like behavior in Nuristani, such as Proto-Indo-European *kʷels- yielding Southeastern Katë kṣō- "to pull" (< *karsā(p/w)aya-). While this occurs in inherited words, the sound change may be due to later convergence with Indo-Aryan and need not be associated with the ruki rule, instead being associated with the general tendency of retroflexion.

Halfmann therefore concludes that the apparent lack of ruki in Nuristani is not an archaism, but more likely the merger of Proto-Indo-Iranian *s and *š as s after the emergence of the retracted sibilant deriving from *ks, with a series of palatalizations occurring after the merger.

=== Albanian ===
According to Orel (2000: 62), Albanian shows a limited ruki-like development, where *s becomes sh only after PIE *y, *w (including their vocalic counterparts *i, *u). E.g.

- lesh 'wool, fleece, hair' < *laysa, cf. Slavic *listъ 'leaf' < *leys-to-
- dash 'ram' < *dawsa, cf. Germanic *deuzą < *dʰews-om
- pishë 'pine' < *pisā, cf. Latin pīnus 'pine' < *pi(t)snos
- prush 'ember' < *prusa, cf. Latin prūna 'ember' < *prusnā; Sanskrit ploṣati 'to burn' < *prews-

This differs from the development of *rs, *ks, and of *s after other vowels, e.g.

- djerr 'fallow land' < *dersa, cf. Greek χέρσος 'dry land' < *ǵʰers-
- hirrë 'whey' < *ksirā, cf. Sanskrit क्षीर / kṣīrá 'milk'
- kohë 'time' < *kāsā, cf. Slavic *časъ 'time' < *kʷeh₁s-eh₂

However, this view of Albanian is controversial. Firstly, the words in question that Orel bases this theory on have shaky etymologies. Dash has a disputed etymology, with rival versions attributing the word not to Proto-Indo-European *dʰews-om but instead *dʰeh₁-l-, or *demh₂ from *dmh₂ "to tame". Pishë meanwhile is argued to not be inherited from Proto-Indo-European at all; rather it and its soundalikes in Greek and Latin are in fact substrate vocabulary. Lesh is alternatively attributed instead to *h₂welh₁- "wool", making it cognate to Latin vellus.

Meanwhile, no ruki-like rule is included in other studies of Proto-Albanian diachrony. Michiel de Vaan (2015) instead has a Proto-Albanian *ʃ emerging from different means, which barely resemble a ruki law: Indo-European *ks shares the fate of simple *s in becoming *ʃ before *t (as occurred for jashtë "outside" and gjashtë "six", but not other cases with *ks where *t did not follow), with *t as the conditioning factor, rather than the prior *k. Meanwhile, the development of *s itself is highly disputed, but in contrast to Orel's view that it was conditioned on a ruki-like phenomenon, De Vaan prefers Kortlandt's view that *s became *ʃ when either followed by an unstressed vowel or intervocalically, regardless of the quality of nearby vowels.

== See also ==
- Glossary of sound laws in the Indo-European languages
