= Shekhandeh =

Shekhandeh Shekhani: شیخاندہ Kamviri: شیخاندہ
- Village
- Location within Khyber Pakhtunkhwa
- Coordinates: 35°41′16″N 71°38′26″E
- Country: Pakistan
- Province: Khyber Pakhtunkhwa
- District: Upper Chitral
- Time zone: UTC+5 (PKT)

Shekhandeh is a village in Upper Chitral District, Khyber Pakhtunkhwa in Pakistan. It is named after the native Nuristani people, who are the speakers of the Shekhani dialect of Kamkata-vari language.
