= Kate language =

Kate language may refer to:

- Kâte language, a Finisterre–Huon language
- Katë language, a Nuristani language
