= Prasun language =

Indo-Iranian language spoken in Afghanistan

Prasun
- Vâsi-vari, Wâsi-wari, Prasuni, Paruni
- Native to: Afghanistan
- Region: Pārūn Valley
- Native speakers: 8,000 (2011)
- Language family: Indo-European: Indo-Iranian; Nuristani; Prasun
- Early forms: Proto-Indo-European: Proto-Indo-Iranian; Proto-Nuristani

Language codes
- ISO 639-3: prn
- Glottolog: pras1239
- ELP: Prasuni
- Linguasphere: 58-ACB-b
- Prasun is classified as Definitely Endangered by the UNESCO Atlas of the World's Languages in Danger

Prasun is a Nuristani language spoken in the Prasun Valley in Afghanistan.

Prasun belongs to the Indo-European language family, and is on the Nuristani group of the Indo-Iranian branch. Prasun is considered as the most divergent of the Nuristani languages.

The Prasun-speaking people are now mostly Muslim since the imposition of Islam by the Afghan ruler Abdur Rahman Khan in 1895. They first followed out of intimidation, then became more devout as younger generations studied Islamic scriptures in Pakistan and India and came back to preach Islam, but they also keep some vestiges of their indigenous pre-Islamic religion. Literacy rates are low: below 1% for people who have it as a first language, and between 15% and 25% for people who have it as a second language.

== Name ==
The endonym Vâsi [waˈsi] is ultimately cognate with Kamviri Přâsü̃ [pɽaˈsỹ] (whence the name Prasun) and Katë Přâsiu [pɽaˈsju].

== Demographics ==
Prasun is a language spoken by the Vâsi (Prasuni) people who are located in the Pârun Valley, known as Vâsi-gul, at the beginning of the Pech River basin in Nuristan Province of northeastern Afghanistan. The native names of the language are Vâsi-vari in the Ṣupu dialect, and Vâsi-veri in the Seć dialect, but it is also known as Prasun, Prasuni, Pārūni, Veron, Verou, and Veruni. The population of Vâsi-gul is between 3,000-6,000, and there are approximately 8,000 native speakers within the valley and other areas, which makes it a vulnerable language.

== Dialects ==
Prasun is broken up into three dialects that are spoken in six villages. The upper dialect, Ṣupu-vari, is spoken in the northernmost village, Ṣupu (Shtive). The central dialect, üšüt-üćü-zumu-vari, is spoken in the middle four villages, Seć (Pronz), Üćü (Dewa), Üšüt (Kshtoki), and Zumu. The lower dialect, Uṣüt-vare, is spoken in Uṣüt (Pashki), the lowest village. For this article, most cited forms will be based on the Seć dialect unless specified otherwise.

One characteristic feature defining all Prasun dialects is the shift of ancient *d to l, which was lost in intervocalic position in other Nuristani languages, such as vazala [wɘˈzɘlɘ] "shoe", compared to Ashkun vâćâ [vaˈt͡sa], Kamviri vâćo [vaˈt͡so], and Nuristani Kalasha oćä [oˈt͡sæ], and the pervasive lenition of initial stops, such as viṭa [wiʈɘ] "wing", compared to Ashkun pâṭu [paˈʈu] "feather", Kamviri pâṭü [paˈʈy] "feather", and Nuristani Kalasha paṭä [paˈʈæ] "feather, wing".

== Classification ==
Prasun is part of the Nuristani branch of the Indo-Iranian languages, which show both Iranian and Indo-Aryan influences, but are otherwise not closely related. Nuristani languages were formerly considered to be Dardic languages, however, they are dissimilar enough from the other Dardic languages to constitute their own branch of the Indo-Iranian language tree. There was also previously confusion on whether "Wasi-wari" and "Prasun" were the same or separate languages, but it was determined that both names referred to the same language. Although it is substantially different from the other Nuristani languages, Prasun shares some similarities with Katë, mainly due to borrowing and areal contacts.

== Phonology ==
=== Vowels ===
Prasun has eight vowels, â, u, o, i, e, ü, ö, and the unmarked vowel, a, which is pronounced as a high central vowel, [ɨ]. Long vowels are denoted with the IPA symbol /:/, such as [iː].

== Vocabulary ==
=== Pronouns ===
Person		Nominative	Accusative	Genitive
1st	sg.	unzu	ândeiš	am
1st	pl.	âsẽ		âs
2nd	sg.	üy	ütyöiš	ĩ
2nd	pl.	miū		âsen

=== Numerals ===
Number	Prasun (Strand)
1	ipin, attege (upün)
2	lūe (lü)
3	chhī (ćši)
4	chipū (čpu)
5	uch (vuču)
6	ushū (vuṣ)
7	sete (sata)
8	aste (âsta)
9	nūh (nu)
10	leze (leza)
11	zizh (züz (Zumu), źuzu (Uṣüt))
12	wizū (vüzu)
13	chhīza (čiz (Zumu), ćšiza (Uṣüt))
14	chipults (čpulć)
15	vishilhts (višilć)
16	ushulhts (uṣulć)
17	setilts (setliz)
18	astilts (âstliz)
19	nalts (nâlć)
20	zū (źu)
30	lezaij
40	jibeze (žibeze)
50	lejjibets
60	chichegzū
70	chichegzālets
80	chipegzū
90	chipegzualets
100	ochegzū
