= Zemiaki language =

Nuristani language of Kunar, Afghanistan

Zemiaki
- J̌amlām-am bašā
- Native to: Afghanistan
- Region: Nuristan Province
- Native speakers: (500 cited 1999)
- Language family: Indo-European: Indo-Iranian; Nuristani; Zemiaki
- Early forms: Proto-Indo-European: Proto-Indo-Iranian; Proto-Nuristani

Language codes
- ISO 639-3: (included in [nli])
- Glottolog: zemi1238
- ELP: Zemiaki

Zemiaki is a Nuristani language spoken by some 400–500 people in the Kunar Province of Afghanistan.

It is named after the settlement in which it is spoken, from the Pashto Zemyaki žə́ba "language of Zemyaki", the native equivalent being J̌amlām-am bašā. It is closely related to Nuristani Kalasha, and ancestors of the Zemyakis were, according to local tradition, Kalasha people who migrated into the area several centuries ago. The language spoken in the surrounding areas is Pashto, and it has been a source of a large number of lexical borrowings, including several common conjunctions.

There is no grammatical gender, but number and person are marked on the verb, following a split-ergative pattern of agreement.

Zemiaki was formerly considered a dialect of Grangali, an Indo-Aryan language. However, its pronouns are characteristically Nuristani, with a close relationship to Nuristani Kalasha, which is confirmed by local tradition.

== Vocabulary ==
=== Pronouns ===
Person		Nominative	Accusative	Genitive
1st	sg.	ake	ũ	ūba, umba
1st	pl.	ami		amba
2nd	sg.	tu		tuba
2nd	pl.	me	ame	amemba

=== Numbers ===
1. yok
2. du
3. tre
4. -
5. -
6. -
7. -
8. -
9. -
10. doš

== Bibliography ==
- Grünberg, A.L. (1999). "Zemiaki jazyk/dialekt". In Edelman, D.I. (ed.). Jazyki mira: Dardskie i nuristanskie jazyki (in Russian). Moscow: Indrik. pp. 123–125. ISBN 585759085X.
