= Tregami language =

Nuristani language spoken in Afghanistan

Tregami
- Gambiri
- Native to: Afghanistan
- Region: Nuristan Province, Kunar Province
- Native speakers: 3,500 (2011)
- Language family: Indo-European: Indo-Iranian; Nuristani; Tregami
- Early forms: Proto-Indo-European: Proto-Indo-Iranian; Proto-Nuristani

Language codes
- ISO 639-3: trm
- Glottolog: treg1243
- ELP: Tregami
- Tregami is classified as Severely Endangered by the UNESCO Atlas of the World's Languages in Danger

Tregami is a Nuristani language spoken in the villages of Gambir, Kaṭâr, and Devoz in the Tregâm Valley off the lower Pech River in the Watapur District of Kunar Province in Afghanistan. The area is in the Hindu Kush along the border with Pakistan. Tregami belongs to the Nuristani group of the Indo-Iranian language family. It is spoken by approximately 3,500 people (2011). Most individuals speak Pashto in addition to Tregami.

Tregami is a close relative of Nuristani Kalasha, spoken in Ghaziabad District to the east, with which it has a lexical similarity of 75% to 80%. Although Tregami villages are close in proximity, there is a slight difference between the dialects of Katar and Gambir. The language has been influenced by the neighboring Indo-Aryan languages like Wotapuri-Katarqalai, Grangali, and by the Nuristani Katë dialects.

== Name ==
The native name is unknown. The exonym Tregâm, from Wotapuri-Katarqalai, literally means "three villages", referencing Gambir, Kaṭâr, and Devoz.

== Sociolinguistic situation ==
Tregami is an unwritten moribund language in the process of being replaced by Pashto, the predominant language of the region. Most Tregami are bilingual in Pashto, and the Tregami people don't have the resources to revive their language.

== Vocabulary ==
=== Pronouns ===
| Person | | Nominative | Accusative | Genitive |
|---|---|---|---|---|
| 1st | sg. | e | žũ | |
| 1st | pl. | âva | žâmâ | |
| 2nd | sg. | tu | to | |
| 2nd | pl. | vi | eme | imârâ |

=== Numbers ===
1. yo
2. du
3. tre
4. čâtâ
5. põč
6. ṣu
7. sut
8. voṣṭ
9. nũ
10. dåš
