= Nuristani =

Nuristani may refer to:

- Nuristani languages, Indo-Iranian languages
- Nuristani people, speakers of the language in Nuristan, Afghanistan

== See also ==
- Nuristan, province of Afghanistan
