= Proto-Indo-Iranian language =

Reconstructed proto-language

Proto-Indo-Iranian
- Proto-Indo-Iranic (PIIr)
- Reconstruction of: Indo-Iranian languages
- Region: Eurasian Steppe
- Era: Late 3rd m. BCE
- Reconstructed ancestor: Proto-Indo-European
- Lower-order reconstructions: Proto-Indo-Aryan; Proto-Iranian; Proto-Nuristani

Proto-Indo-Iranian, also called Proto-Indo-Iranic or Proto-Aryan, is the reconstructed proto-language of the Indo-Iranian branch of Indo-European. Its speakers, the hypothetical Proto-Indo-Iranians, are assumed to have lived in the late 3rd millennium BCE, and are often connected with the Sintashta culture of the Eurasian Steppe and the early Andronovo archaeological horizon.

Proto-Indo-Iranian was a satem language, likely removed less than a millennium from its ancestor, the late Proto-Indo-European language, and in turn removed less than a millennium from its descendants: Vedic Sanskrit (of the Rigveda) and Old Avestan (of the Gathas).

It is the ancestor of Indo-Aryan languages, the Iranian languages, and the Nuristani languages, predominantly spoken in the Southern Asian subregion of Eurasia.

== Descriptive phonology ==
Proto-Indo-Iranian consonant segments
Type		Labial	Coronal		Palatal		Velar	Laryngeal
Type		Labial	dental/alveolar	post-alveolar	first	second	Velar	Laryngeal
Plosive	voiceless	*p	*t		*ć	*č	*k	
Plosive	aspirated	*pʰ	*tʰ				*kʰ	
Plosive	voiced	*b	*d		*ȷ́	*ǰ	*g	
Plosive	voiced aspirated	*bʰ	*dʰ		*ȷ́ʰ	*ǰʰ	*gʰ	
Affricate	voiceless		*tˢ					
Affricate	voiced		*dᶻ					
Fricative	voiceless		*s	*š				*H
Fricative	voiced		(*z)	*ž				
Fricative	aspirated			*žʰ				
Nasal		*m	*n					
Liquid			(*l)	*r				
Semivowel		*w			*y			

PII vowel segments
High	*i (*ī)	*u (*ū)
Low	*a *ā	

In addition to the vowels, *H, and *r̥ could function as the syllabic core. In many reconstructions, instances of *iH and *uH occur instead of *ī and *ū.

=== Two palatal series ===
Proto-Indo-Iranian is hypothesized to have contained two series of stops or affricates in the palatal to postalveolar region. The phonetic nature of this contrast is not clear, and hence they are usually referred to as the primary or first series (*ć *ȷ́ *ȷ́ʰ, continuing Proto-Indo-European palatovelar *ḱ *ǵ *ǵʰ) and the second or secondary series (*č *ǰ *ǰʰ, continuing Proto-Indo-European plain and labialized velars, *k, *g, *gʰ and *kʷ, *gʷ, *gʷʰ, in palatalizing contexts). The following table shows the most common reflexes of the two series (Proto-Iranian is the hypothetical ancestor to the Iranian languages, including Avestan and Old Persian):

PII	Proto-Indo-Aryan	Sanskrit	Proto-Iranian	Avestan	Old Persian	Nuristani
*ć	*ś	ś ([ɕ]/[ç])	*c ([t͡s])	s	θ	ċ ([t͡s])
*ȷ́	*j	j ([d͡ʑ]/[ɟ])	*j ([d͡z])	z	d	j̈ ([d͡z]) (> z)
*ȷ́ʰ	*źh	h ([ɦ])	*j ([d͡z])	z	d	j̈ ([d͡z]) (> z)
*č	*c	c ([t͡ɕ]/c)	*č	č	č	č
*ǰ	*j	j ([d͡ʑ]/[ɟ])	*ǰ	ǰ	ǰ	ǰ
*ǰʰ	*źh	h ([ɦ])	*ǰ	ǰ	ǰ	ǰ

=== Laryngeal ===
Proto-Indo-European is usually hypothesized to have had three to four laryngeal consonants, each of which could occur in either syllabic or non-syllabic positions. In Proto-Indo-Iranian, the laryngeals merged as one phoneme /*H/. Beekes suggests that some instances of this /*H/ survived into Rigvedic Sanskrit and Avestan as unwritten glottal stops as evidenced by metrics.

=== Accent ===
Like Proto-Indo-European and Vedic Sanskrit (and also Avestan, though it was not written down), Proto-Indo-Iranian had a pitch accent system similar to present-day Japanese, conventionally indicated by an acute accent over the accented vowel.

== Historical phonology ==
The most distinctive phonological change separating Proto-Indo-Iranian from Proto-Indo-European is the collapse of the ablauting vowels *e, *o into a single vowel, Proto-Indo-Iranian *a (but see Brugmann's law). Bartholomae's law and the ruki sound law were also complete in Proto-Indo-Iranian.

A fuller list of some of the hypothesized sound changes from Proto-Indo-European to Proto-Indo-Iranian follows:

- The Satem shift, consisting of two sets of related changes. The PIE palatals *ḱ *ǵ *ǵʰ are fronted or affricated, eventually resulting in PII *ć, *ȷ́, *ȷ́ʰ, while the PIE labiovelars *kʷ *gʷ *gʷʰ merge with the velars *k *g *gʰ.

PIE	PII	Sanskrit	Avestan	Nuristani	Latin	English	Glossary
*ḱm̥tóm	*ćatám	śatám	satəm		centum	hund(red)	id
*ǵónu	*ȷ́ā́nu	jā́nu	zānu	Kt. SE j̈õ	genū	knee	id
*ǵʰimós	*ȷ́ʰimás	himá	ziiā̊	Kt. SE j̈im	hiems		'winter' / 'snow'
*kʷós	*kás	kás	ka	Kt. SE kā	quis	who	id
*gʷṓws	*gā́wš	gaus	gao	Kt. go	bōs	cow	id
*gʷʰormós	*gʰarmás	gharmás	garəma		formus	warm	'warmth, heat'

- Word final *r was lost after long vowels.

PIE	PII	Sanskrit	Avestan	Nuristani	Latin	English	Glossary
*ph₂tḗr	*pHtā́	pitā́	ptā		pater	father	id

- The PIE liquids *l *r *l̥ *r̥ merge as *r *r̥.

PIE	PII	Sanskrit	Avestan	Nuristani	Latin	English	Glossary
*ḱléwos	*ćráwas	śrávas	srauua	Kt. SE c̣o	clueō		'fame, honour, word'
*wĺ̥kʷos	*wŕ̥kas	vŕ̥kas	vəhrka		lupus	wolf	id
*gʷʰormós	*gʰarmás	gharmás	garəma		formus	warm	'warmth, heat'

- The PIE syllabic nasals *m̥ *n̥ merge with *a. Word final *m̥ instead became *am.

PIE	pre-PII	PII	Sanskrit	Avestan	Nuristani	Latin	English	Glossary
*gʷm̥tós	*gm̥tás	*gatás	gatá	gata	Kt. W gëvë́	ventus	come	'come, gone'
*pódm̥	*pā́dm̥	*pā́dam	pā́dam	padəm	Pr. wəl	pedem		'foot' (accusative singular)
*n̥bʰrós	*n̥bʰrás	*abʰrás	abhrá	aβra		imber		'rain, cloud'

- Bartholomae's law: an aspirate immediately followed by a voiceless consonant becomes voiced stop + voiced aspirate.

PIE	PII	Sanskrit	Avestan	Nuristani	English	Glossary
*ubʰtós	*ubdʰás	sámubdha	ubdaēna		web, weave	'woven' / 'made of woven material'
*wr̥dʰtós	*wr̥dᶻdʰás	vṛddhá	vərəzda			'grown, mature'
*dʰéwgʰti	*dáwgdʰi	dógdhi	*daogdi	Pr. lüšt 'daughter'	daugh(·ter)	'to milk'
*wóbʰsos	*wábžʰas		vaβžaka	Kt. SE vušpík	wasp	id

- The PIE double-dental rule is phonemicized with the sequence DD becoming *tˢt (or *dᶻdʰ if one of the dental consonants is an aspirate). Additionally, DsC̥ > tˢC̥ and DsC̬ > dᶻC̬.

PIE	PII	Sanskrit	Avestan	Nuristani	Latin	English	Glossary
*widtós	*witˢtás	vittá	vista		vīsus	OE. wiss	'found'
*bʰudʰtós	*bʰudᶻdʰás	buddhá	busta				'aware, awake'
*údskʷeh₁	*utˢčáH	uccā́	usca		ū̆sque		'above, upwards'
*Hódsgʷos	*Hádᶻgas	ádga		Pr. izóg			'branch, twig'

- The Ruki rule: *s is retracted to *š when immediately following a liquid (*r *r̥ *l *l̥), a high vowel (*i *u), a PIE velar (*ḱ *ǵ *ǵʰ *k *g *gʰ *kʷ *gʷ *gʷʰ) or the syllabic laryngeal *H̥. Its allophone *z likewise becomes *ž.

PIE	PII	Sanskrit	Avestan	Nuristani	Latin	English	Glossary
*wisós	*wišás	víṣas	viša	Katë viš	vīrus		'poison, venom'
*ḱeHs-	*ćH̥šam	aśiṣam	sīšā				'teach!'
*ǵéwseti	*ȷ́áwšati	jóṣati	zaošō		gustus		'to like, taste'
*kʷsép-	*kšáp-	kṣáp-	xšap-				'darkness'
*plúsis	*plúšiš	plúṣi	*fruši		pūlex		'flea, noxious insect'
*nisdós	*niždás	nīḷá/nīḍá	*nižda		nīdus	nest	'nest'

- Before a dental occlusive, *ć becomes *š and *ȷ́ becomes *ž. *ȷ́ʰ also becomes *ž, with aspiration of the occlusive.

PIE	pre-PII	PII	Sanskrit	Avestan	Nuristani	Latin	English	Glossary
*h₁oḱtṓ	*Haćtā́	*Haštā́	aṣṭá	ašta		octō	eight	'eight'
*dr̥ḱtós	*dr̥ćtás	*dr̥štás	dr̥ṣṭá	dərəšta				'seen, visible, apparent'
*mr̥ǵt-	*mr̥ȷ́d-	*mr̥žd-	mr̥ḷ-/mr̥ḍ-	mərəžd-				'to forgive, pardon'
*uǵʰtós	*uȷ́dʰás	*uždʰás	ūḍhá	*užda	Kt. SE ṓzë 'came'	vector	weight	'carried'

- The sequence *ćš was simplified to *šš.

PIE	pre-PII	PII	Sanskrit	Avestan	Nuristani	Latin	English	Glossary
*h₂éḱs-	*Háćšas	*Háššas	ákṣa	aša		axis	axle	'axle, shoulder'

- The "second palatalization" or "law of palatals": *k *g *gʰ develop palatal allophones *č *ǰ *ǰʰ before the front vowels *i, *e. through an intermediate *kʲ *gʲ *gʲʰ.

PIE	pre-PII	PII	Sanskrit	Avestan	Nuristani	Latin	English	Glossary
*-kʷe	*-kʲa	*-ča	-ca	-ča		-que		'and'
*gʷih₃wós	*gʲiHwás	*ǰiHwás	jīvás	juuō	Kt. ǰiv- 'to be alive'	vīvus	quick	'alive, living'
*gʷʰénti	*gʲʰánti	*ǰʰánti	hánti	jaiṇti	Kt. SE ǰaň-	-fendit		'slays'

- Brugmann's law: *o or *ó in an open syllable lengthens to *ā.

PIE	pre-PII	PII	Sanskrit	Avestan	Nuristani	Latin	Glossary
*deh₃tórm̥	*daHtā́rm̥	*daHtā́ram	dātā́ram	dātārəm		datōrem	'giver' (accusative singular)

- The vowels *e *o merge with *a. Similarly, *ē, *ō merge with *ā. This has the effect of giving full phonemic status to the second palatal series *č *ǰ *ǰʰ.

PIE	PII	Sanskrit	Avestan	Nuristani	Latin	English	Glossary
*dédeh₃ti	*dádaHti	dádāti	dadāiti	Kt. pře-	dat		'to give'
*h₃dónts	*Hdánts	dant	dantan	Kt. dut	dēns	tooth	'tooth'
*bʰréh₂tēr	*bʰráHtā	bhrā́tr̥	brātar	Kt. břo	frāter	brother	'brother'
*wṓkʷs	*wā́kš	vā́k	vāxš		vōx		'voice'

- In certain positions, laryngeals were vocalized to *i. This preceded the second palatalization.

- Following a consonant, and preceding a consonant cluster

PIE	PII	Sanskrit	Avestan	Nuristani	Latin	Glossary
*ph₂tréy	*pitráy	pitré	piθrē		patrī	'father' (dative singular)

- Following a consonant and word-final

PIE	PII	Sanskrit	Avestan	Nuristani	Glossary
*-medʰh₂	*-madʰHi	-mahi	-maidī/-maiδi		(1st person plural middle ending)

- The laryngeal *h₂ (and possibly *h₁) aspirates the previous stop consonant and satem palatals. Notably this creates new voiceless aspirated stops. The laryngeal also disappears if it's followed by a vowel.

PIE	PII	Sanskrit	Avestan	Nuristani	Latin	English	Glossary
*gʰegʰróbh₂e	*ǰagrábʰa	jagrabha	jāgərəbuš				'grabbed'
*m̥ddh₁éh₂	*adᶻdʰáH	addhā́	azdā				'known'
*méǵh₂os	*máȷ́ʰas	máhas	mazah				'greatness'
*dʰugh₂tḗr	*dʰúgʰHtā	duhitṛ́	Pr. lüšt 'daughter'			daughter	id
*(s)pHóy(m)nos	*pʰáy(m)nas	phéna		Kt. NE paňë́		foam	id
*pl̥th₂ús	*pr̥tʰúš	pṛthú	pərəθu			flat	'broad'
*kh₂idéti	*kʰidáti	khidáti			caedō		'to cut'

- The Indo-European laryngeals all merged into one phoneme *H, which may have been a glottal stop. This was probably contemporary with the merging of *e and *o with *a.

PIE	PII	Sanskrit	Avestan	Nuristani	Latin	English	Glossary
*dʰh₁tós	*dʰHtás	dhitá	dāta		-ditus		'placed, created'

- According to Lubotsky's Law, *H disappeared when followed by a voiced nonaspirated stop and another consonant:

PIE	PII	Sanskrit	Avestan	Nuristani	Glossary
*bʰéh₂geti	*bʰáǰati	bhájati	bažat̰		'to divide, distribute'

== Subsequent sound changes ==
Among the sound changes from Proto-Indo-Iranian to Indo-Aryan is the loss of the voiced sibilants *z, *ẓ, *ź; among those to Proto-Iranian is the de-aspiration of the PIE voiced aspirates.

Post-Indo-Iranian Phonological Development
PII	→ Vedic Sanskrit	Special developments	→ Proto-Iranian	Special developments
*p	p		*p	*f (before a consonant except after *s or *š)
*pʰ	ph	p (Grassmann's law)	*f	*p (after a consonant)
*b	b		*b	
*bʰ	bh	b (Grassmann's law)	*b	
*t	t	ṭ (after *š, *ž, or *žʰ); kṣ (PII tć → kṣ)	*t	*θ (before a consonant except after *s or *š)
*tʰ	th	ṭh (after *š or *ž); t (Grassmann's law); ṭ (after *š or *ž + Grassmann's law)	*θ	*t (after a consonant)
*tˢ	t		*s	
*d	d	ḍ (after *š, *ž, or *žʰ)	*d	
*dʰ	dh	ḍh (after *š or *ž); d (Grassmann's law); ḍ (after *š or *ž + Grassmann's law)	*d	
*dᶻ	d		*z	
*k	k		*k	*x (before a consonant except after *s or *š)
*kʰ	kh	k (Grassmann's law)	*x	*k (after a consonant)
*g	g		*g	
*gʰ	gh	kṣ (PII gʰžʰ → kṣ); g (Grassmann's law)	*g	
*ć	ś	ch (PII *sć/šć → ch); cch (PII *VsćV/VšćV → VcchV); kṣ (PII ćš → kṣ)	*c	*š (PII *ćs/ćš/šć → *š); ∅ (after *s)
*ȷ́	j	jj (PII *zȷ́/žȷ́ → jj)	*j	∅ (before *š)
*ȷ́ʰ	h	jj (PII *zȷ́ʰ/žȷ́ʰ → jj); kṣ (PII ȷ́ʰžʰ → kṣ); j (Grassmann's law)	*j	∅ (before *š)
*č	c	ch (PII *sč/šč → ch); cch (PII *VsčV/VščV → VcchV)	*č	*š (before *y)
*ǰ	j	jj (PII *zǰ/žǰ → jj)	*ǰ	
*ǰʰ	h	jj (PII *zǰʰ/žǰʰ → jj); j (Grassmann's law)	*ǰ	
*s	s	ḥ (before a pause)	*h	*s (before nasals and plosives, or after plosives and *n); *š (after *p or *b); *ž (after *bʰ); *x (word initially before a consonant)
*š	ṣ	ḥ (before a pause)	*š	
*ž	∅ (lengthening previous vowel)		*ž	∅ (after a palatal obstruent)
*žʰ	∅ (lengthening previous vowel)		*ž	∅ (after a palatal obstruent)
*y	y		*y	
*w	v	u (after a vowel)	*w	
*m	m	b (word initially before a consonant)	*m	
*n	n	ñ (before or after a palatal consonant); ṇ (after a retroflex consonant or *r within the same word with no palatal or dental consonant in between)	*n	
*r	r	ḥ (before a pause)	*r	
*r̥	ṛ	īr (before *H); ūr (before *H in the neighborhood of labials)	*r̥	
*i	i		*i	
*a	a		*a	
*ā	ā		*ā	
*u	u		*u	
*H	∅ (lengthening previous vowel)	i (in between consonants)	*H	

Proto-Indo-Iranian	Old Iranian (Av, OP)	Vedic Sanskrit
*Háćwas "horse"	Av aspa, OP asa	áśva
*bʰaHgás "portion, share"	Av bāga	bhāgá
*bʰráHtā "brother"	Av, OP brātar	bhrā́tr̥
*bʰúHmiš "earth, land"	OP būmiš	bhū́mi-
*mártyas "mortal, man"	Av maṣ̌iia, OP martiya	mártya
*mā́Has "moon"	Av mā̊, OP māha	mā́s
*wásr̥ "spring"	Av vaŋhar	vásara "morning"
*Hr̥tás "truth"	Av aṣ̌a, OP arta	r̥tá
*dʰráwgʰas "lie"	Av draoγa, OP drauga	drógha "using malicious words"
*sáwmas "pressed (juice)"	Av haoma	sóma-

== Morphology and basic vocabulary ==
Proto-Indo-Iranian has preserved much of the morphology of Proto-Indo-European (PIE): thematic and athematic inflection in both nouns and verbs, all three numbers (singular, dual and plural), all the tense, mood and voice categories in the verb, and the cases in the noun.

=== Personal pronouns (nominative case) ===
Pronouns, nouns and adjectives are inflected into the eight cases of PIE: nominative, genitive, dative, accusative, vocative, ablative, locative and instrumental (with also a comitative/sociative meaning).

Pronoun	PIE	PII
I	*éǵ > *eǵHóm	*aȷ́Hám > *aȷ́ʰám
You	*túh₂	*túH
He	*ey- (*eyóm?) *só	*ayám *sá
She	*séh₂	*sáH
It	*tód	*tád
We	*wéy > *weyóm	*wayám
You (all)	*yū́	*yúH
They (m.)	*tóy	*táy
They (f.)	*téh₂es	*tā́s (or *táHas?)
They (n.)	*téh₂	*táH

=== Three examples of verbs ===
In verbs, the chief innovation is the creation of a passive conjugation with the suffix *-yá, with middle inflection.

The following examples lack the dual plural and are conjugated in the present tense.

"To bear/carry"
Pronoun	PIE	PII
I	*bʰéroh₂ > *bʰéroh₂mi	*bʰáraHmi
You	*bʰéresi	*bʰárasi
He, she, it	*bʰéreti	*bʰárati
We	*bʰéromos > *bʰéroh₂mos?	*bʰáraHmas
You (all)	*bʰérete	*bʰáratʰa
They	*bʰéronti	*bʰáranti

"To call/summon"
Pronoun	PIE	PII
I	(*ǵʰéwyemi >) *ǵʰwéyoh₂mi?	*ȷ́ʰwáyaHmi
You	*ǵʰwéyesi	*ȷ́ʰwayasi
He, she, it	*ǵʰwéyeti	*ȷ́ʰwáyati
We	*ǵʰwéyomos > *ǵʰwéyoh₂mos?	*ȷ́ʰwáyaHmas
You (all)	*ǵʰwéyete	*ȷ́ʰwayatʰa
They	*ǵʰwéyonti	*ȷ́ʰwáyanti

"To be" (athematic)
Pronoun	PIE	PII
I	*h₁ésmi	*Hásmi
You	*h₁ési	*Hási
He, she, it	*h₁ésti	*Hásti
We	*h₁smós	*Hsmás
You (all)	*h₁sté	*Hstʰá
They	*h₁sénti	*Hsánti

=== Examples of noun declension ===
Despite Proto-Indo-Iranian preserving much of the original morphology of Proto-Indo-European, an important innovation in the noun is the creation of a genitive plural ending *-nām used with vowel stems.

The following examples lack the dual number.

==== Masculine noun ====
"Wolf"
Case	Singular	Plural
Nom.	PIE *wĺ̥kʷos > PII *wŕ̥kas	PIE *wĺ̥kʷoes > PII *wŕ̥kā(s)
Gen.	*wĺ̥kʷosyo > *wŕ̥kasya	*wĺ̥kʷoHom > *wŕ̥kāna(H)m
Dat.	*wĺ̥kʷoey > *wŕ̥kāy	*wĺ̥kʷobʰos > *wŕ̥kaybʰyas
Acc.	*wĺ̥kʷom > *wŕ̥kam	*wĺ̥kʷoms > *wŕ̥kāns
Voc.	*wĺ̥kʷe > *wŕ̥ka	*wĺ̥kʷoes > *wŕ̥kā(s)
Abl.	*wĺ̥kʷead > *wŕ̥kāt	*wĺ̥kʷobʰos > *wŕ̥kaybʰyas
Loc.	*wĺ̥kʷoy > *wŕ̥kay	*wĺ̥kʷoysu > *wŕ̥kayšu
Instr.	*wĺ̥kʷoh₁ > *wŕ̥kā	*wĺ̥kʷōys > *wŕ̥kāyš

==== Feminine noun ====
"Cow" (e.g., Latin "vacca")
Case	Singular	Plural
Nom.	PIE *woḱéh₂ > PII *waćáH	PIE *woḱéh₂es > PII *waćā́s
Gen.	*woḱéh₂s > *waćáyaHs	*woḱéh₂oHom > *waćáHnām
Dat.	*woḱéh₂ey > *waćáyaHy	*woḱéh₂bʰos > *waćáHbʰyas
Acc.	*woḱā́m > *waćā́m	*woḱéh₂m̥s > *waćā́s
Voc.	*woḱéh₂ > *waćay	*woḱéh₂es > *waćā́s
Abl.	*woḱéh₂s > *waćáyaHs	*woḱéh₂bʰos > *waćáHbʰyas
Loc.	*woḱéh₂(i) > *waćáyaH(m)	*woḱéh₂su > *waćáHsu
Instr.	*woḱéh₂h₁ > *waćáyaH́	*woḱéh₂bʰis > *waćáHbʰiš

==== Neuter noun ====
"Yoke"
Case	Singular	Plural
Nom.	PIE *yugóm > PII *yugám	PIE *yugéh₂ > PII *yugáH
Gen.	*yugósyo > *yugásya	*yugóHom > *yugā́na(H)m
Dat.	*yugóey > *yugā́y	*yugóbʰos > *yugáybʰyas
Acc.	*yugóm > *yugám	*yugéh₂ > *yugáH
Voc.	*yugóm > *yugám	*yugéh₂ > *yugáH
Abl.	*yugéad > *yugā́t	*yugóbʰos > *yugáybʰyas
Loc.	*yugóy > *yugáy	*yugóysu > *yugáyšu
Instr.	*yugóh₁ > *yugā́	*yugṓys > *yugā́yš

=== An example of adjectival declension ===
The morphology in adjectival declension is identical to the one in noun declension. The following example lacks the dual number.

"Immortal" (*n̥-mr̥t-ós)
Case	Masculine (singular)	Feminine (singular)	Neuter (singular)
Nom.	PIE *n̥mr̥tós > PII *amŕ̥tas	PIE *n̥mr̥téh₂ > PII *amŕ̥taH	PIE *n̥mr̥tóm > PII *amŕ̥tam
Gen.	*n̥mr̥tósyo > *amŕ̥tasya	*n̥mr̥téh₂s > *amŕ̥tayaHs	*n̥mr̥tósyo > *amŕ̥tasya
Dat.	*n̥mr̥tóey > *amŕ̥tāy	*n̥mr̥téh₂ey > *amŕ̥tayaHi	*n̥mr̥tóey > *amŕ̥tāy
Acc.	*n̥mr̥tóm > *amŕ̥tam	*n̥mr̥tā́m > *amŕ̥tām	*n̥mr̥tóm > *amŕ̥tam
Voc.	*n̥mr̥té > *amŕ̥ta	*n̥mr̥téh₂ > *amŕ̥tay	*n̥mr̥tóm > *amŕ̥tam
Abl.	*n̥mr̥téad > *amŕ̥tāt	*n̥mr̥téh₂s > *amŕ̥tayaHs	*n̥mr̥téad > *amŕ̥tāt
Loc.	*n̥mr̥tóy > *amŕ̥tay	*n̥mr̥téh₂(i) > *amŕ̥tayaH(m)	*n̥mr̥tóy > *amŕ̥tay
Instr.	*n̥mr̥tóh₁ > *amŕ̥tā	*n̥mr̥téh₂h₁ > *amŕ̥tayaH	*n̥mr̥tóh₁ > *amŕ̥tā

Case	Masculine (plural)	Feminine (plural)	Neuter (plural)
Nom.	PIE *n̥mr̥tóes > PII *amŕ̥tā(s)	PIE *n̥mr̥téh₂es > PII *amŕ̥tās	PIE *n̥mr̥téh₂ > PII *amŕ̥taH
Gen.	*n̥mr̥tóHom > *amŕ̥tāna(H)m	*n̥mr̥téh₂oHom > *amŕ̥taHnām	*n̥mr̥tóHom > *amŕ̥tāna(H)m
Dat.	*n̥mr̥tóbʰos > *amŕ̥taybʰyas	*n̥mr̥téh₂bʰos > *amŕ̥taHbʰyas	*n̥mr̥tóbʰos > *amŕ̥taybʰyas
Acc.	*n̥mr̥tóms > *amŕ̥tāns	*n̥mr̥téh₂m̥s > *amŕ̥tās	*n̥mr̥téh₂ > *amŕ̥taH
Voc.	*n̥mr̥tóes > *amŕ̥tā(s)	*n̥mr̥téh₂es > *amŕ̥tās	*n̥mr̥téh₂ > *amŕ̥taH
Abl.	*n̥mr̥tóbʰos > *amŕ̥taybʰyas	*n̥mr̥téh₂bʰos > *amŕ̥taHbʰyas	*n̥mr̥tóbʰos > *amŕ̥taybʰyas
Loc.	*n̥mr̥tóysu > *amŕ̥tayšu	*n̥mr̥téh₂su > *amŕ̥taHsu	*n̥mr̥tóysu > *amŕ̥tayšu
Instr.	*n̥mr̥tṓys > *amŕ̥tāyš	*n̥mr̥téh₂mis > *amŕ̥taHbʰiš	*n̥mr̥tṓys > *amŕ̥tāyš

=== Numerals ===
Numeral	PIE	PII
One (1)	*h₁óynos > *h₁óykos	*Háykas
Two (2)	*dwóh₁	*dwáH
Three (3)	*tréyes	*tráyas
Four (4)	*kʷetwóres	*čatwā́ras
Five (5)	*pénkʷe	*pánča
Six (6)	*swéḱs	*šwáćš
Seven (7)	*septḿ̥	*saptá
Eight (8)	*oḱtṓw	*Haštā́
Nine (9)	*h₁néwn̥	*Hnáwa
Ten (10)	*déḱm̥	*dáća

== See also ==
- Glossary of sound laws in the Indo-European languages
- Substratum in the Vedic language

== Bibliography ==
- Beekes, Robert Stephen Paul (1988). A Grammar of Gatha-Avestan. Leiden; New York: Brill. ISBN 90-04-08332-4.
- Burrow, T. (1973). The Sanskrit Language (third ed.). London: Faber & Faber. ISBN 0-571-04819-6.
- Fortson, Benjamin W. (2004). Indo-European Language and Culture: An Introduction (illustrated ed.). Malden, MA: Blackwell Publishing. ISBN 1-4051-0316-7.
- Lubotsky, A. M. (1988). The System of Nominal Accentuation in Sanskrit and Proto-Indo-European. Leiden; New York: Brill. ISBN 90-04-08835-0.
- Alexander Lubotsky, "The Indo-Iranian substratum" in Early Contacts between Uralic and Indo-European, ed. Carpelan et al., Helsinki (2001).
- Asko Parpola, 'The formation of the Aryan branch of Indo-European', in Blench and Spriggs (eds), Archaeology and Language III, London and New York (1999).
