= Ashkun language =

Nuristani language spoken in Afghanistan

Ashkun
- Âṣkuňu, Saňu-vīri
- Native to: Afghanistan
- Region: Nuristan Province
- Native speakers: 40,000 (2011)
- Language family: Indo-European: Indo-Iranian; Nuristani; Ashkun
- Early forms: Proto-Indo-European: Proto-Indo-Iranian; Proto-Nuristani
- Writing system: Arabic script, Latin script

Language codes
- ISO 639-3: ask
- Glottolog: ashk1246
- ELP: Ashkun
- Linguasphere: 58-ACA-a
- Ashkun is classified as Definitely Endangered by the UNESCO Atlas of the World's Languages in Danger

Ashkun (Âṣkuňu) is a Nuristani language spoken by the Ashkun people – also known as the Âṣkun, Âṣkuňu, Askina, Saňu, Sainu, Yeshkun, Wamas, or Grâmsaňâ – from the region of the central Pech Valley around Wâmâ and in some eastern tributary valleys of the upper Alingar River in Afghanistan's Nuristan Province. Other major places where the language of Ashkun is spoken are Nuristan Province, Pech Valley in Wama District, eastern side of the Lower Alingar Valley in Nurgaram and Duab districts, Malil wa Mushfa, Titin, Kolatan and Bajagal valleys.

It is classified as a member of the Nuristani sub-family of the Indo-Iranian languages.

== Name ==
The name Ashkun comes from Âṣkuňu [aʂkuˈɽ̃u] in the local language. The alternative name Saňu [sɘˈɽ̃u] in Ashkun, denoting a group of people living in Wâmâ, has cognates in other Nuristani languages, such as Kamviri Ćâňu [t͡saˈɽ̃u], Katë Ćâvřu [t͡saˈβɻu], and Prasun Zünyu [zyn̪ˈju].

== Demographics ==
Current status: There are currently about 40,000 ethnic people who speak this language. None of the mentioned people are monolinguals. Illiteracy rate among this group of people is around 5%-15%.

Location: Upper-middle Pech Valley and over the watershed into the Bâźâigal, Mâsēgal, and Titin valleys of upper Laghmân.

Dialects/Varieties: Âṣkuňu-veri (Kolâtẫ, Titin, Bâźâigal), Gřâmsaňâ-vīri, Saňu-vīri (Wâmâî). Not intelligible with the other Nuristani languages.

== Dialects ==
Ashkun can be split into several dialects spoken in southwestern Nuristan, including Âṣkuňu-veri (Kolâtẫ), Gřâmsaňâ-vīri, Saňu-vīri (Wâmâî), Titin, and Bâźâigal. The main body of the Âṣkuňu tribe inhabits the Aṣkũgal (Kolâtẫ, Mâsēgal) Valley, which drains southwestward into the Alingar River. These people speak a dialect which differs from that of their neighbors in the Titin Valley to the south (cf. Morgenstierne 1929). The inhabitants of the Bâźâigal Valley further up the Alingar are reported to speak a third dialect. Across a mountain ridge to the east of the Âṣkuňu two tribal groups, each with its own dialect, center on the villages of Wâmâ and Gřâmsaňâgřām (Ačaṇu) off the Pech River. For this article, most cited forms will be based on the Wâmâ dialect (Saňu-vīri).

== Phonology ==
=== Consonants ===
		Labial	Dental/ Alveolar	(Alveolo-) palatal	Palato- alveolar	Retroflex	Velar
Plosive	voiceless	p	t			ʈ	k
Plosive	voiced	b	d			ɖ	ɡ
Affricate	voiceless		(t͡s)	t͡ɕ	t͡ʃ	t͡ʂ	
Affricate	voiced		(d͡z)	d͡ʑ	d͡ʒ	d͡ʐ	
Fricative	voiceless	(f)	s		ʃ	ʂ	(x)
Fricative	voiced	v	z		ʒ	ʐ	(ɣ)
Nasal		m	n			ɳ	ŋ
Tap			(ɾ)			ɽ, (ɽ̃)	
Approximant			l	j			

- /ɽ/ can be heard as nasalized [ɽ̃] or as a nasal tap [ɳ̆], when within nasalized vowel positions, contrasting with a retroflex nasal [ɳ].
- /t͡ɕ, d͡ʑ/ can have fronted allophones of [t͡s, d͡z] in free variation.
- The tap [ɾ] is in complementary distribution with /ɽ/.
- Sounds [f, x, ɣ, q, ħ, ʕ, ʔ, h] also may occur, but they are not fully integrated in the sound system.

=== Vowels ===
	Front	Central	Back
High	i	(ɨ)	u
Mid	e	ə	o
Low		a	

- Vowels may also be nasalized as /ĩ, ẽ, ə̃, ã, õ, ũ/
- /ə, ə̃/ can have allophones of [ɨ, ɨ̃].

== Orthography ==
The Ashkun language is passed on strictly orally and has no written resources that can be traced.

== Vocabulary ==
=== Pronouns ===
Person		Nominative	Accusative	Genitive
1st	sg.	âi	iũ	imâ
1st	pl.	ima		imbâ
2nd	sg.	tu	to	toâ̄
2nd	pl.	vi	iã	iâmbâ

=== Numbers ===
1. âc̣
2. du
3. tra
4. ćâtâ̄
5. põć
6. ṣo
7. sōt
8. ōṣṭ
9. no
10. dos

== Literature ==
- Cardona, G. (2014). Indo-Iranian languages. Encyclopædia Britannica.
- Grierson, G. A. (1927). Report on a Linguistic Mission to Afghanistan. By Georg Morgenstierne. Oslo: H. Aschehoug and Co.(W. Nygaard). 10× 6, 98 pp. and 3 maps. Price 2s. 9d. Journal of the Royal Asiatic Society of Great Britain & Ireland (New Series), 59(02), 368–375.
- Grierson, G. A. (1927). [Review of Report on a Linguistic Mission to Afghanistan]. Journal of the Royal Asiatic Society of Great Britain and Ireland, (2), 368–375. JSTOR 25221151
- Klimburg, M. (1999). The Kafirs of the Hindu Kush: art and society of the Waigal and Ashkun Kafirs (Vol. 1). Franz Steiner Verlag.
- Morgenstierne, G. (1929). The language of the Ashkun Kafirs. Aschehoug.
- Strand, Richard F. (1973). Notes on the Nūristāni and Dardic Languages. Journal of the American Oriental Society.
- Turner, R. L. (1932). The Language of the Ashkun Kafirs. By G. Morgenstierne. Extract from Norsk Tidsshrift for Sprogvidenskap, Bind ii, 1929. pp. 192–289. Journal of the Royal Asiatic Society of Great Britain & Ireland (New Series), 64(01), 173–175.
- Voegelin, C. F., & Voegelin, F. M.. (1965). Languages of the World: Indo-European Fascicle One. Anthropological Linguistics, 7(8), 1–294. JSTOR 30022511
- Where on earth do they speak Ashkun? (2015, November 15). Retrieved February 11, 2016, from http://www.verbix.com/maps/language/Ashkun.html
