= Brugmann's law =

Sound law in the Indo-Iranian languages

In historical linguistics, Brugmann's law describes the outcomes of the Proto-Indo-European vowel *o in the Indo-Iranian languages based on the syllabic context in which the vowel occurred. In short, when the Proto-Indo-European short vowel *o occurred in an open syllable – that is, a syllable in which the vowel is the final element – it became the Proto-Indo-Iranian long vowel *ā so long as the syllable was not word-final. Otherwise, *o became the short vowel *a. The law is named for the German linguist Karl Brugmann.

== History ==
In 1879, the German linguist Karl Brugmann published an article in the Zeitschrift für vergleichende Sprachforschung ('Journal of Comparative Linguistics') entitled "Zur Geschichte der nominalsuffixe -as-, -jas-, und -vas-". The original formulation of the process was originally set up using a previous publication of his which argued that there was a non-high vowel in the Proto-Indo-European language which resulted in different reflexes in the other Indo-European daughter languages, but in a tripartite system of alternates all with a surface representation of *a which behaved differently in different contexts; these alternates were termed *a₁, *a₂, and *a₃ which generally corresponded to *e, *o, and *a, respectively, elsewhere. (Note: Under this outdated analysis, *a₂ corresponded to *o in Armenian, Greek, Italic, and Slavic, but as *a in Celtic, Germanic, and Baltic.) Based on the work of August Schleicher and Franz Bopp, Brugmann determined that *a₂ under this system was originally a "half-long" vowel, based on its comparatively varied reflexes in the descendant languages of Proto-Indo-European, which behaved differently in closed and open syllables; in closed syllables, it became a short *a sound, but in open syllables, it became a long *ā.

Although Brugmann referred to the process as a law (German: Gesetz) in his own work, Hermann Osthoff – one of Brugmann's closest collaborators – is credited with having coined the version using Brugmann's name.

== Overview ==
The theory accounts for a number of otherwise puzzling facts. Sanskrit has pitaraḥ, mātaraḥ, bhrātaraḥ for "fathers, mothers, brothers" but svasāraḥ for "sisters", a fact neatly explained by the traditional reconstruction of the stems as *-ter- for "father, mother, brother" but *swesor- for "sister" (cf. Latin pater, māter, frāter but soror). Similarly, the vast majority of n-stem nouns in Indic have a long stem-vowel, such as brahmāṇaḥ "Brahmins", śvānaḥ "dogs" (from *ḱwones), correlating with information from other Indo-European languages that they were originally *on-stems. There are also some exceptions, including ukṣan- "ox", which in the earliest Indic text, the Rigveda, shows forms as ukṣǎṇaḥ "oxen". They were later replaced by "regular" formations (ukṣāṇaḥ and so on, some as early as the Rigveda itself), but the notion that the short stem vowel might have been from an *en-stem is supported by the unique morphology of the Germanic forms: Old English oxa nominative singular "ox", exen plural; the Old English plural stem, such as the nominative, continues Proto-Germanic *uhsiniz < *uhsenez, with e > i in noninitial syllables followed, in Old English, by an umlaut. This is the only Old English n-stem that certainly points to *en-vocalism, rather than *on-vocalism.

== Exceptions ==
The rule seems to apply to only an *o that is the ablaut alternant of *e. Non-apophonic *o, with no alternant, developed into Indo-Iranian *ă: *poti- "master, lord" > Sanskrit pati-, not ˣpāti (there is no such root as *ˣpet- "rule, dominate"). Alternatively, it is explained by the voiceless consonant after the vowel (see also Sanskrit prati < *proti), but to adopt a form of the sound law that affects only *o in open syllables, followed by a voiced consonant, seems to be a slim basis for a rule that is so general in Indo-Iranian. Limiting the original environment to that before voiceless consonants then requires levelling of long-vowel forms to perfects and nouns with final voiceless consonants in Pre-Indo-Iranian. That faces particular problems in explaining the archaic form ānāśa 'he/she has reached' < *h₁eh₁noḱe, with its very idiosyncratic synchronic relation to Sanskrit √aś 'reach'.

Several exceptions can be addressed by the laryngeal theory. The form that is traditionally reconstructed as *owis "sheep" (Sanskrit ǎvi-), is a good candidate for again reconstructing, as *h₃ewi- (with an o-colouring laryngeal), rather than an ablauting o-grade.

Perhaps the most convincing confirmation comes from the inflection of the perfect: a Sanskrit root like sad- "sit" has sasada for "I sat" and sasāda for "he, she, it sat". The conventional 19th century wisdom saw it as some kind of "therapeutic" reaction to the Indo-Iranian merger of the endings *-a "I" and *-e "he/she/it" as -a, but it was troubling that the distinction was found only in roots that ended with a single consonant. That is, dadarśa "saw" is both first- and third-person singular, but a form like ˣdadārśa would have been allowed by Sanskrit syllable structure. The mystery was solved when the ending of the perfect in the first person singular was reanalyzed, on the basis of Hittite evidence as *-h₂e, beginning with an a-colouring laryngeal. In other words, while Brugmann's law was still operative, a form of the type *se-sod-h₂e in the first-person singular did not have an open root syllable.

A problem for the interpretation is that roots that quite plainly must have ended in a consonant cluster including a laryngeal, such as jan- < *ǵenh₁- "beget" and therefore should have had a short vowel throughout (like darś- "see" < *dorḱ-) nevertheless show the same patterning as sad-: jajana first-person singular, jajāna third-person singular. Whether that is a catastrophic failure of the theory or just levelling is uncertain, but after all, those who think the pattern seen in roots like sad- has a morphological, not phonological, origin, have their own headaches, such as the total failure of this "morphological" development to include roots ending in two consonants. Such an argument would anyway cut the ground out from under the neat distributions seen in the kinship terms, the special behaviour of "ox" and so on.

Perhaps the most worrisome data are adverbs such as Sanskrit prati, Greek pros (< *proti) (meaning "motion from or to a place or location at a place", depending on the case of the noun that it governs) and some other forms, all of which appear to have ablauting vowels. They also all have a voiceless stop after the vowel, which may or may not be significant.

== Current status ==
Brugmann's law is widely accepted among specialists in Indo-European and Indo-Iranic linguistics. (Note: Attributed to multiple sources:) Jerzy Kuryłowicz, the author of the explanation of the sasada/sasāda matter (in his Études indoeuropéennes I), eventually abandoned his analysis for of an appeal to the theory of marked vs unmarked morphological categories.

Martin Joachim Kümmel compares Brugmann's law to developments in Anatolian and Tocharian languages and to Saussure's losses of laryngeals near *o in the internal reconstruction of pre-PIE *o as longer than *e.

== See also ==
- Glossary of sound laws in the Indo-European languages
