= Shumashti language =

Indo-Aryan language of Afghanistan

Shumashti
- Shumasht
- Native to: Afghanistan
- Region: Kunar Province
- Native speakers: (1,000 cited 1994)
- Language family: Indo-European: Indo-Iranian; Indo-Aryan; Dardic; Kunar; Shumashti

Language codes
- ISO 639-3: sts
- Glottolog: shum1235
- ELP: Shumashti
- Shumashti is classified as Severely Endangered by the UNESCO Atlas of the World's Languages in Danger

Shumashti – also known as Shumasht – is an Indo-Aryan language spoken in eastern Afghanistan. It is spoken in parts of Kunar Province: on the western side of the Kunar Valley between Jalalabad and the Pech Valley. The number of speakers was estimated at 1,000 in 1994.

It has been influenced by the Northeast Pashai languages, and it is related to the Grangali language, with which it shares about a third of its basic vocabulary, and to Gawar-Bati, with which it has about half of its basic lexis in common.
