= Western Katë dialect =

Katë dialect of Afghanistan

Western Katë
- Native to: Afghanistan
- Region: Nuristan, Kunar
- Native speakers: 140,000 (2017)
- Language family: Indo-European: Indo-Iranian; Nuristani; Katë; Western Katë
- Writing system: Arabic script

Language codes
- ISO 639-3: bsh
- Glottolog: kati1270

Western Katë is a dialect of the Katë language spoken by the Kata in parts of Afghanistan. The most used alternative names are Kata-vari or Kati.

Together with the Northeastern dialect, it is spoken by approximately 40,000 people (mostly in Afghanistan, just over 3,700 in Pakistan), and its speakers are Muslim. Literacy rates are low: below 1% for people who have it as a first language, and between 15% and 25% for people who have it as a second language.

There are several subdialects spoken in the Ramgal, Kulam, Ktivi and Paruk valleys of Nuristan.

== Innovations ==
According to Halfmann (2024), the primary innovations of the Western dialect include loss of nasalization, a progressive suffix -n-, and a past copula stem st-.

== Phonology ==
=== Consonants ===
		Labial	Dental/ Alveolar	Palato- alveolar	Retroflex	Palatal	Velar
Plosive	voiceless	p	t		ʈ		k
Plosive	voiced	b	d		ɖ		ɡ
Affricate	voiceless		t͡s	t͡ʃ	t͡ʂ		
Affricate	voiced			d͡ʒ	d͡ʐ		
Fricative	voiceless	(f)	s	ʃ	ʂ		(x)
Fricative	voiced	v	z	(ʒ)	ʐ		(ɣ)
Nasal		m	n		ɳ		ŋ
Tap			ɾ		(ɽ)		
Approximant	lateral		l				
Approximant	central				ɻ	(j)	

- Sounds /ʒ ɽ ɣ/ occur from neighboring languages. /f x/ are borrowed from loanwords.
- /ʈ/ can also be heard as an allophone [ɽ].
- [j] is heard as an allophone of /i/.
- /v/ can also be heard as bilabial [β] or a labial approximant [w].

=== Vowels ===
	Front	Central	Back
High	i	ə	u
Mid	e	ə	o
Low		a	

- Mid /ə/ can be heard as a close central [ɨ].

== Vocabulary ==
=== Pronouns ===
Person		Direct	Oblique
1st	sg.	vúze, vúzë (Ktivi)	ye, yéme
1st	pl.	yimó, yimú (Ktivi)	
2nd	sg.	tyu	tu
2nd	pl.	šo	

=== Numbers ===
1. e, ev
2. dyu
3. tre
4. štëvó
5. puč
6. ṣu
7. sut
8. vuṣṭ
9. nu
10. duċ
11. yaníċ
12. diċ
13. triċ
14. šturéċ, štruċ (Ktivi)
15. pčiċ
16. ṣeċ
17. stiċ
18. ṣṭiċ
19. neċ
20. vëċë́
