= Nangalami language =

Indo-Aryan language spoken in Afghanistan

Nangalami
- Grangali
- Gṛangali bašə
- Native to: Afghanistan
- Native speakers: (5,000, incl. Zemiaki cited 1994)
- Language family: Indo-European: Indo-Iranian; Indo-Aryan; Dardic; Kunar; Nangalami
- Dialects: Grangali; Nangalami (Ningalami) †

Language codes
- ISO 639-3: nli
- Glottolog: gran1245
- ELP: Grangali
- Ak is classified as Severely Endangered by the UNESCO Atlas of the World's Languages in Danger

Nangalami, or Grangali, is an Indo-Aryan language spoken in Afghanistan. Zemiaki was formerly considered a Nangalami dialect, but has been reassessed and placed in the Nuristani language group being close to Waigali. Moreover, the pronouns are fundamentally different.
