= Richard Strand =

American linguist and ethnographer

Richard F. Strand is a linguist and anthropological researcher who is best known for his research into Nuristani languages and other little-known languages of Afghanistan and neighboring areas of Pakistan.

He was trained at Cornell University. He has published material on the linguistics and ethnography of Nuristan and neighboring regions, collected and analyzed since 1967. Funding for his field research in Nuristan, Afghanistan, and Pakistan was provided in part by the following institutions: the Fulbright Foundation (1991–92), the Smithsonian Institution (1980, 1984–85), The Wenner-Gren Foundation for Anthropological Research (1972), Brown University (1971), Cornell University (1966–69, 1970), and Teachers College, Columbia University (1967–69).
