= Nuristani Kalasha language =

Southern Nuristani language

Nuristani Kalasha
- Waigali
- Kalaṣa-alâ
- Native to: Afghanistan
- Region: Nuristan Province
- Native speakers: 12,000 (2011)
- Language family: Indo-European: Indo-Iranian; Nuristani; Nuristani Kalasha
- Early forms: Proto-Indo-European: Proto-Indo-Iranian; Proto-Nuristani

Language codes
- ISO 639-3: wbk
- Glottolog: waig1243
- ELP: Waigali
- Linguasphere: 58-ACC-a
- Nuristani Kalasha is classified as Definitely Endangered by the UNESCO Atlas of the World's Languages in Danger

Nuristani Kalasha (Kalaṣa-alâ), also known as Waigali, is a Nuristani language spoken by about 10,000 people in the Nuristan Province of Afghanistan. The native name is Kalaṣa-alâ 'Kalasha-language'. "Waigali" refers to the dialect of the Väi people of the upper part of the Waigal Valley, centered on the town of Waigal, which is distinct from the dialect of the Čima-Nišei people who inhabit the lower valley. The word 'Kalasha' is the native ethnonym for all the speakers of the southern Nuristani languages.

Nuristani Kalasha belongs to the Indo-European language family, and is in the Nuristani group of the Indo-Iranian branch. It is closely related to Zemiaki and to Tregami, the lexical similarity with the latter being approximately 76% to 80%.

It shares its name with the Indo-Aryan Kalasha language (Kalaṣa-mun), spoken in Pakistan's southern Chitral District, but the two languages belong to different branches of Indo-Iranian. Speakers of Nuristani Kalasha (Kalaṣa-alâ) are sometimes called "Red Kalasha", while the speakers of Indo-Aryan Kalasha are called “Black Kalasha.” The Kalash people are very close to the Nuristani people in terms of culture and historic religion. According to linguist Richard Strand the Kalasha of Chitral apparently adopted the name of the Nuristani Kalasha, who at some unknown time had extended their influence into the region of southern Chitral.

== Name ==
The name Kalasha-ala comes from Kalaṣa [kalaˈʂa], a term denoting the Kalash people, which also covers the distantly related Indo-Aryan Kalasha language (Kalaṣa-mun), hence the language is called "Nuristani Kalasha". The name "Waigali" comes from Vägal [væˈɡal] < Vâigal [vaːi̯ˈɡal], from Vä [ˈvæ] < Vâi [ˈvaːi̯] "Vai" and gal [ˈɡal] "valley".

== Dialects ==
According to linguist Richard Strand, Nuristani Kalasha contains several dialects spoken among the Väi, Vai, or Vä peoples, the Čima-Nišei people, and the Vântä people. Within the Väi, the Väi-alâ, Ameš-alâ, and Ẓönči-alâ subdialects are spoken. Among the Čima-Nišei, the Nišei-alâ and Čimi-alâ subdialects are spoken. The exact dialect of the Vântä is unclear, but is most probably Nišei-alâ. For this article, most cited forms will be based on the Nišei dialect (Nišei-alâ).

== Phonology ==
Nuristani Kalasha consonants
		Labial	Dental/ Alveolar	Retroflex	Postalveolar/ Palatal	Velar	Uvular	Pharyngeal	Glottal
Stop	voiceless	p	t̪	ʈ		k	(q)		(ʔ)
Stop	voiced	b	d̪	ɖ		ɡ			(ʔ)
Affricate	voiceless		ts	tʂ	tɕ				
Affricate	voiced				dʑ				
Fricative	voiceless	(f)	s	ʂ	ɕ	(x)		(ħ)	(h)
Fricative	voiced	w~β^{2}	z	ʐ		(ɣ)		(ʕ)	(h)
Approximant		w~β^{2}	l̪		j	w			
Nasal		m	n̪	ɳ~ɽ̃^{1}		ŋ			
Rhotic	nasalised		ɹ̃	ɳ~ɽ̃^{1}					
Rhotic	plain		ɾ	ɽ~ɹ^{3}					

Symbols in brackets are foreign sounds.

1. /ɳ/ becomes [ɽ̃] intervocalically.
2. /w/ becomes [β] before /ɹ, ɹ̃/ and next to front vowels.
3. Post-consonantally, /ɽ/ retroflexes the following vowels in the word, sounding like a /ɹ/ before or after the vowel. Post-consonantally before a front vowel, /ɽ/ simply turns to /ɹ/.

== Grammar ==
=== Word Order ===
Nuristani Kalasha is a head-final SOV language, with the verb coming at the end of the clause in main and subordinate clauses, imperatives, and questions.

Subordination often takes the form of absolute participles, and multiple absolutes can be inserted between the subject and the main verb of the clause, e ṣera manaṣ (1) lapa ka, (2) bāṇia-kana zora dati, (3) a-ṣāyw tāy, beranc̣ey "A blind man, (1) having made a torch, having poured milk in a pot, having put it on his head, went out", e.g.. But there are also subordinate clause constructions that stand outside the main clause. There are a number of dedicated subordinating and coordinating conjunctions, and a number of particles and postpositions can also be used with clauses as subordinators.

=== Morphosyntactic Alignment ===
Subjects and objects are inflected in a split ergative system:

- There is a morphologically unmarked 'direct' case used for the subjects of all intransitive verbs and an 'oblique' case used for all indirect objects and benefactives and also for postpositions.
- For transitive verbs in the perfective ('preterite'), perfect, and pluperfect, the direct object is in the direct case and the transitive subject is in the oblique case. (These verb forms are all morphologically based on the preterite stem and conjugate not only for person but for sex-based gender.)
- For transitive verbs in the present, future, imperfect, and subjunctive, the subject is in the direct case. The direct object is also in the direct case if it is indefinite, but it is in the oblique case if it is definite. (These verb forms are all morphologically based on the present stem and mostly conjugate only for person and number.)

=== Nominal Morphology ===
Kalasha-ala nouns are marked for case (direct, oblique, instrumental, locative, and vocative) and sometimes for number (singular or plural).

Kalasha-ala Case Endings
Case	Singular	Plural
Direct	-	-
Vocative	-a	-ay
Oblique	-a	-ā̃
Instrumental	-i	?
Locative	-iw	?

The case endings change slightly in form depending on the declension of the noun to which they are attached, usually by merging with the final vowel of the stem. A genitive is made by attaching -ba to the oblique.

Only oblique and vocative nouns have unique fusional forms for the singular and plural. For some nouns, however, a plural may be made by adding a suffix to the stem:

- -kina for many personal terms like 'father', with the plural ending -kinā̃ in the oblique, and
- -ān or -ā̃ for many animals, with -āna in the oblique.

For relationships between people, there is some possessive morphology in addition to the genitive. When the possessor is 2nd person (singular or plural) the other person is marked with an -w, tuba sosow "your sister", and when the possessor is 3rd person the other person is marked with -s, yoma sosas "his sister", yema sosas "their sister". This suffix comes between the noun and any case and number marking, ameba sos-kina "your sisters". 1st person possessives have no suffix.

Noun declensions, unlike adjective and verb endings, never vary based on gender.

=== Verbal morphology ===
There are two basic stems for verbs from which are built a number of conjugated tense/aspect/moods - the present stem is used to make not only presents but futures, imperfects, imperatives, and subjunctives; the preterite stem is used to make not only the preterite, but the perfect and pluperfect as well as some futures (likely originally future perfects). In addition there are a few non-finite verb forms using one of the two stems. There is a morphological causative with its own stem, typically built off the present stem.

Conjugated verb forms reflect the person and number and, in some tenses, sex-based gender of their subjects.

Present verbal person endings
Person	Singular	Plural
1st	-m	-miš
2nd	-š	-w
3rd	-i/y	-t

Preterite verbal person endings
Person	Masculine singular	Feminine singular	Plural
1st	-m	-am	-miš
2nd	-š	-aš	-w
3rd	-i/y	-ay	-t

=== Adjectival Morphology ===
Some adjectives are inflected for gender, with -a for masculines and -i for feminines. Adjectives can be used on their own as nouns, and can be inflected for case then, but when being used to modify nouns they have no case marking.

=== Numbers ===
Like in many languages of the area, the number system is base twenty.

Numbers 1-20
1	ew, e	11	yāš
2	dü	12	bāš
3	tre	13	trõš
4	čatā	14	čadiš
5	ponč	15	pačiš
6	ṣu	16	ṣẽš
7	sot	17	satāš
8	oṣṭ	18	ṣṭaš
9	nu	19	ẽši
10	doš	20	wiši

Compound numbers are formed by multiplying twenties with an oblique -e and then adding the remainder, e.g. wiše yāš "31"; dü-wiše ew "41". Curiously, the common word for "400", azār, is borrowed from the Persian word hazār "thousand", and čatā sawa from the Pashto sawa "hundred" is also used.

Numbers are often suffixed with -i when not accompanied by count nouns, possibly from ...ye "and...". For some odd multiples of 10, the doš seems to require an -i, so dü-wiše doši "50" and tre-wiše doši "70".

There is a multiplicative suffix -ar (e-ar "once", čatā-ar "four times") and a distributive made by reduplication of the first consonant (dadü "per two", papũč "per five", wawoṣṭ "per eight"; nane "each" is irregular).

The only attested ordinals are the Persian loanwords awal "first" and düum "second".

== Vocabulary ==
=== Pronouns ===
Person		Nominative	Accusative	Genitive
1st	sg.	aŋa	ũ	uma
1st	pl.	ämi	äme	ämeba
2nd	sg.	tü	tu	tuba
2nd	pl.	vi	vẫ	vẫma

== Bibliography ==
- Strand, Richard F. (2022). "Ethnolinguistic and Genetic Clues to Nûristânî Origins". International Journal of Diachronic Linguistics and Linguistic Reconstruction. 19: 267–353.
