= Proto-Nuristani language =

Reconstructed ancestor of the Nuristani language family

Proto-Nuristani
- PNur
- Reconstruction of: Nuristani languages
- Region: Fergana Region, modern-day Uzbekistan
- Era: around 800 BC
- Reconstructed ancestors: Proto-Indo-European: Proto-Indo-Iranian

Proto-Nuristani is the reconstructed proto-language of the Nuristani languages. Proto-Nuristani is descended from Proto-Indo-Iranian, which in turn is descended from Proto-Indo-European.

Jakob Halfmann is currently working on the reconstruction of Proto-Nuristani through systematic analysis of the sound developments found in the modern languages.

== History ==
Proto-Nuristani is the latest common form of all modern-day Nuristani languages. Since diverging from the other Indo-Iranian languages, the Nuristani-speaking peoples have maintained social interactions with other Indo-Iranian peoples, influencing each other's linguistic and cultural landscapes. There have been some phonological developments that were shared with Indo-Aryan and Iranian languages at different stages of development, as well as sound changes specific to the Nuristani languages. Due to the lack of direct attestation of Nuristani languages until the 19th century, it is difficult to deduce much detail about Proto-Nuristani, without resorting to extensive internal comparisons between the modern-day Nuristani languages, and external comparisons with earlier forms of attested Indo-Iranian languages.

There is evidence that Nuristani languages have more in common with Iranian languages at an early period, before the introduction of Indo-Aryan loanwords starting from the Middle Indo-Aryan period and subsequent convergence.

The earliest divergence of Proto-Nuristani from the other Indo-Iranian languages may be indicated by the fact that the Ruki sound law does not apply after *u: e.g. Northeastern Katë musë /muˈsɘ/ "mouse" < *mūs-a-ka-. However, Halfmann posits a merger of *s and *š as *s, which was subsequently palatalized near *i.

Proto-Nuristani shares with Iranian languages the merger of the tenuis and breathy-voiced consonants, the preservation of the distinction between the two sets of Indo-Iranian voiced palatals (which merged in Indo-Aryan), and the fronting of the Proto-Indo-Iranian primary palatal consonants. The latter were retained as dental affricates in Proto-Nuristani, in contrast to simplification to sibilants in most Iranian languages.

Proto-Nuristani is distinguished by the lack of debuccalizing /s/ to /h/ as in Indo-Aryan. Later on Proto-Nuristani *j̈ /*d͡z/ shifted to /z/ in all Nuristani varieties other than Southeastern Katë and Tregami, while Proto-Nuristani *ċ /*t͡s/ shifted to /s/ only in Ashkun (though in some instances it is retained as /t͡s/; evidence suggests that this reflex comes instead from Proto-Nuristani *ċċ).

Proto-Nuristani started to break off into distinct languages from around the 8th century BCE. From this point, the influences from surrounding Indo-Aryan and Iranian languages onto early Nuristani languages have been highly complex, due to different patterns of migration and settlement by various Nuristani-speaking tribes. This is demonstrated by the existence of disparate sound changes in individual Nuristani languages that make it difficult to neatly classify them into groups that share a common sound change on the same timeline.

== Selected reconstructions ==
The reconstructions given below are very tentative.

*ačāni "eyes" (Halfmann 2023)

*āp-pešáni "water mill" (Halfmann 2023)

*dáca "ten" (Kreidl 2021)

*dúǰitā "daughter" (Kreidl 2021)

*dū́ "two" (Kreidl 2021)

*dvára- "door" (Halfmann 2023)

*dvāráka- "doorjambs" (Halfmann 2023)

*Kānta-ka- "Katë" (Halfmann 2024)

*páda- "footprint" (Kreidl 2021)

*pra-dā- "to give" (Kreidl 2021)
