= Katë language =

Nuristani language

Katë
- Kati, Kâmkata-vari, Kâmkata-mumkṣta-vari
- Native to: Afghanistan, Pakistan
- Region: Nuristan, Kunar, Chitral
- Ethnicity: Katë people
- Native speakers: 150,000 (2011-2017)
- Language family: Indo-European: Indo-Iranian; Nuristani; Katë
- Early forms: Proto-Indo-European: Proto-Indo-Iranian; Proto-Nuristani
- Dialects: Western; Northeastern; Southeastern
- Writing system: Arabic script (Nastaliq)

Language codes
- ISO 639-3: Either: bsh – Kati xvi – Kamviri
- Glottolog: kati1270
- ELP: Kati
- Linguasphere: 58-ACB-a
- Katë is classified as Definitely Endangered by the UNESCO Atlas of the World's Languages in Danger

Katë, also known as Kati or Kamkata-vari, is a Nuristani language. It is a dialect continuum comprising three separate dialects spoken mostly in Afghanistan, with additional speakers in the Chitral District of Pakistan deriving from recent migrations a century ago. The Kata-vari (comprising Western and Northeastern) and Kamviri (comprising Southeastern) dialects are sometimes erroneously reckoned as two separate languages, but according to linguist Richard Strand they form one language.

The Katë language is the largest Nuristani language, spoken by 40,000–60,000 people, from the Kata, Kom, Mumo, Kshto and some smaller Black-Robed tribes in parts of Afghanistan and Pakistan. The most used alternative names for the language are Kati or Bashgali.

== Name ==
The name, pronounced [kaˈtɘ], is the ethnonym of the Katë people. Cognates of the ethnonym in other Nuristani languages include Nuristani Kalasha Kā̃ta [kãːˈta]. According to Halfmann, the names descend from a Proto-Nuristani form *Kānta-ka-.

== Dialects ==
There are three main dialects according to Halfmann (2024): Western Katë, Northeastern Katë, and Southeastern Katë (including Kamviri and Mumviri). The dialects are sometimes erroneously defined as separate languages. The Northeastern Katë dialect is commonly referred to as Shekhani in Chitral. In older literature, Southeastern Katë is split into Kamviri and Mumviri.

== Classification ==
It belongs to the Indo-European language family and is in the Nuristani group of the Indo-Iranian branch. Glottolog proposes the following phylogenetic classification:

- Nuristani
  - Ashkun-Kate-Waigali
    - Ashkun-Kate
      - Katë (Kamviri, Kataviri and Mumviri)

== Status ==
Literacy rates are low: below 1% for people who have it as a first language and between 15% and 25% for people who have it as a second language. The Kata-vari dialect can be heard on radio in Afghanistan.

== Phonology ==
=== Vowels ===
Katë has six primary vowel qualities, with some variation in the pronunciation: /i, ɛ~ɜ, ɐ~a, u, ɘ~ɨ, ɔ/.

| | Front | Central | Back |
|---|---|---|---|
| Close | i ⟨i⟩ | ɘ ~ ɨ ⟨ë⟩ | u ⟨u⟩ |
| Mid | ɛ~ɜ ⟨e⟩ | ɘ ~ ɨ ⟨ë⟩ | ɔ ⟨o⟩ |
| Open | | ɐ ~ a ⟨a⟩ | |

In the Northeastern dialect, vowel length and nasalization are both phonemic in all vowels except /ɘ~ɨ/.

=== Consonants ===
Consonants in Katë (northeastern dialect)
| | | Labial | Dental | Retroflex | Palatal | Velar | Uvular | Glottal |
|---|---|---|---|---|---|---|---|---|
| Nasal | | m | n̪ ⟨n⟩ | ɳ ⟨ṇ⟩ | | ŋ | | |
| Plosive | voiceless | p | t̪ ⟨t⟩ | ʈ ⟨ṭ⟩ | | k | (q) | (ʔ) |
| Plosive | voiced | b | d̪ ⟨d⟩ | ɖ ~ ɽ ⟨ḍ, ṛ⟩ | | g | | |
| Tap | | | ɾ ⟨r⟩ | ɖ ~ ɽ ⟨ḍ, ṛ⟩ | | | | |
| Affricate | voiceless | | t̪͡s̪ ⟨ċ⟩ | ʈ͡ʂ ⟨c̣⟩ | t͡ɕ ⟨č⟩ | | | |
| Affricate | voiced | | | | d͡ʑ ⟨ǰ⟩ | | | |
| Fricative | voiceless | (f) | s | ʂ ⟨ṣ⟩ | ɕ ⟨š⟩ | | (χ) ⟨x⟩ | (h) |
| Fricative | voiced | v ~ ʋʷ ⟨v⟩ | z | ʐ ⟨ẓ⟩ | | | (ʁ) ⟨ɣ⟩ | |
| Approximant | oral | v ~ ʋʷ ⟨v⟩ | l̪ (l) | ɻ ⟨r̆⟩ | j ⟨y⟩ | | | |
| Approximant | nasal | | | ɻ̃ ⟨n̆⟩ | | | | |

Notes

- Marginal phonemes are in parentheses.
- /ɽ/ is considered an allophone of /ɖ/ in the Northeastern dialect, but is perceived by native speakers as a separate sound.
- /ɳ/ may also be realized as /ɽ̃/, especially intervocalically.

== Grammar ==
=== Nouns ===
Nouns in Katë are inflected for number, gender, and case. Number in Katë distinguishes between singular and plural, and nouns can be masculine or feminine, although there is no predictable pattern for determining the gender of a noun.

==== Cases ====
There are a maximum of 7 cases in Katë: direct, oblique, genitive, instrumental, locative, ablative, and vocative. However, this differs between dialects and no one noun has a distinct form for all cases. Cases that express a syntactic function only appear on the final element of a phrase, and preceding elements in a noun phrase appear in the direct case.

iki purd-ë kašir-dari
DEM.MED.SG old-M white-beard.DIR
'that old whitebeard'

== Sources ==
- Halfmann, Jakob (2024). A Grammatical Description of the Katë Language (Nuristani) (PhD thesis). Köln: Universität zu Köln.
