= Northeastern Katë dialect =

Kamkata-vari dialect of Afghanistan and Pakistan

Northeastern Katë
- Native to: Afghanistan, Pakistan
- Region: Nuristan, Kunar, Chitral
- Native speakers: 1,500 (Pakistani speakers only) (2003)
- Language family: Indo-European: Indo-Iranian; Nuristani; Katë; Northeastern Katë
- Writing system: Arabic script

Language codes
- ISO 639-3: bsh
- Glottolog: kati1270

Northeastern Katë is a dialect of the Katë language spoken by the Kata in parts of Afghanistan and Pakistan. It also includes the so-called Shekhani dialect spoken in Chitral district of Khyber-Pakhtunkhwa province of Pakistan.

There are several subdialects spoken in the upper Landai Sin Valley. It is also spoken in Chitral District, in Gobor and the upper Bumboret Valley in Pakistan.

== Innovations ==
According to Halfmann (2024), the primary innovations of the Northeastern dialect include secondary vowel length from monophthongization of vowel + v, a progressive suffix -t-, and epenthesis of original *tr and *dr clusters.

== Orthography ==
In August 2022, Pakistani linguist, Rehmat Aziz Chitrali proposed a keyboard to Khowar Academy, Chitral.

== History ==
Speakers of Eastern Katë dialects migrated from Kamdesh in Nuristan in modern-day Afghanistan to Lutkuh Valley in Chitrali Princely State in British Raj during the 19th century. Most speakers in Pakistan speak either Pashto or Khowar as a second language. Many native speakers often marry the minority Pashtuns in the area.

== Phonology ==
=== Consonants ===
		Labial	Dental/ Alveolar	Palato- alveolar	Retroflex	Palatal	Velar	Glottal
Plosive	voiceless	p	t		ʈ		k	
Plosive	voiced	b	d		ɖ		ɡ	
Affricate	voiceless		t͡s	t͡ʃ	t͡ʂ	t͡ɕ		
Affricate	voiced			d͡ʒ	d͡ʐ			
Fricative	voiceless	(f)	s	ʃ	ʂ	ɕ	(x)	h
Fricative	voiced	v	z	(ʒ)	ʐ	ʑ	(ɣ)	
Nasal		m	n		ɳ		ŋ	
Tap			ɾ		(ɽ)			
Approximant	lateral		l					
Approximant	central				ɻ	(j)		

- Sounds /ʒ ɽ ɣ/ occur from neighboring languages. /f x/ are borrowed from loanwords mainly from Khowar or Yidgha.
- /ʈ/ can also be heard as an allophone [ɽ].
- [j] is heard as an allophone of /i/.
- /v/ can also be heard as bilabial [β] or a labial approximant [w].

=== Vowels ===
	Front	Central	Back
High	i	ə	u
Mid	e	ə	o
Low		a	

- Mid /ə/ can be heard as a close central [ɨ].

== Vocabulary ==
=== Pronouns ===
Person		Direct	Oblique
1st	sg.	ũ, ũċ	ĩ, yẽ
1st	pl.	imú	
2nd	sg.	tyu	tu
2nd	pl.	šo	

=== Numbers ===
1. e, ev
2. dyu
3. tëre
4. štëvó
5. puč
6. ṣu
7. sut
8. uṣṭ
9. nu
10. duċ
11. yaníċ
12. diċ
13. tëríċ
14. šturéċ
15. pčiċ
16. ṣeċ
17. stiċ
18. ṣṭiċ
19. neċ
20. vëċë́
