= Southeastern Katë dialect =

Kamkata-vari dialect of Afghanistan and Pakistan

Southeastern Katë
- Native to: Afghanistan
- Region: Nuristan, Kunar
- Native speakers: 20,000 (2011)
- Language family: Indo-European: Indo-Iranian; Nuristani; Katë; Southeastern Katë
- Writing system: Arabic script

Language codes
- ISO 639-3: xvi Kamviri
- Glottolog: kati1270

Southeastern Katë is a dialect of the Katë language spoken by the Kom and Kata in parts of Afghanistan and Pakistan. It includes the so-called Kâmvʼiri and Mumviri dialects, spoken in Mangul, Sasku and Gabalgrom in the Bashgal Valley.

== Innovations ==
According to Halfmann (2024), the primary innovations of the Southeastern dialect include secondary vowel length from monophthongization of vowel + v, a progressive suffix -n-, intervocalic consonant lenition (usually sibilants and velars), post-nasal voicing, and merger of Proto-Nuristani pre-tonic *a and *ā as a.

== Phonology ==
The inventory as described by Richard Strand. In addition, there is stress.

The neutral articulatory posture, as in the reduced vowel /a/, consists of the tip of the tongue behind the lower teeth and a raised tongue root is linked with a raised larynx, producing a characteristic pitch for unstressed vowels of about an octave above the pitch of a relaxed larynx.

=== Consonants ===
		Labial	Dental/ Alveolar	Retroflex	Postalv./ Palatal	Velar
Plosive	voiceless	p	t	ʈ		k
Plosive	voiced	b	d	ɖ		ɡ
Affricate	voiceless		t͡s	t͡ʂ	t͡ʃ	
Affricate	voiced		d͡z	d͡ʐ	d͡ʒ	
Fricative	voiceless	(f)	s	ʂ	ʃ	(x)
Fricative	voiced	v	z	ʐ	ʒ	ɣ
Nasal		m	n	ɳ		ŋ
Tap			ɾ	(ɽ)		(ɡ̆)
Approximant	median	(w)		ɻ	j	
Approximant	lateral		l			

- [f x q ɢ ħ ʕ h ʔ] are found in loanwords.
- Between vowels, /s ʂ ʃ/ voice to [z ʐ ʒ].
- /v/ can also be heard as bilabial [β] or a as labial approximant [w].
- For most speakers, and especially in Kombřom, /ʈ/ becomes a retroflex flap [ɽ].
- /k/ becomes a velar tap [ɡ̆].
- One suffix /ti/ voices to [di] for most speakers.
- The sequences /ʈɭ ɖɭ/ are phonetically affricates [ʈꞎ ɖ𝼅].
- Nasals voice a following obstruent.
- Laminal consonants change a following /a/ from [ɨ] to [i].

=== Vowels ===
	Front	Central	Back
Close	i y	(ɨ) ⟨a⟩	u
Mid	e̞	ə ⟨a⟩	o̞
Open		a ⟨â⟩	(ɔ)

⟨a⟩ is [ː] after another vowel, [i] after a laminal consonant and after /ik, ek, iɡ, eɡ/. For some speakers, it is [u] after /uk, yk, uɡ, yɡ/. Otherwise it is [ə] or [ɨ].

== Vocabulary ==
=== Pronouns ===
Person		Direct	Genitive	Oblique
1st	sg.	õ, õċ	yĩ	yī̃
1st	pl.	yimó		yimṓ
2nd	sg.	tü	tu	tū
2nd	pl.	šo		šō

=== Numbers ===
1. e, ev, ē
2. dü
3. tre
4. što
5. puč
6. ṣu
7. sut
8. vuṣṭ
9. nu
10. duċ
11. yaníċ
12. diċ
13. triċ
14. štreċ
15. pačíċ
16. ṣeċ
17. satíċ
18. aṣṭíċ
19. neċ
20. viċí

== Bibliography ==
- Strand, Richard F. (20 April 2019). "The Kom". Richard Strand's Nuristan Site. Archived from the original on 26 September 2023.
- The Mumo. Retrieved July 10, 2006, from Richard F. Strand: Nuristan, Hidden Land of the Hindu-Kush .
- Strand, Richard F. (1973). "Notes on the Nūristāni and Dardic Languages". Journal of the American Oriental Society. 93 (3): 297–305. doi:10.2307/599462. JSTOR 599462.
- Strand, Richard F. (2023). "Ethnolinguistic and Genetic Clues to Nûristânî Origins". International Journal of Diachronic Linguistics and Linguistic Reconstruction. 19: 267–353. doi:10.29091/9783752002348. ISBN 978-3-7520-0234-8.
