= Nuristani languages =

Language group of the Indo-Iranian language family

Nuristani
- Geographic distribution: Nuristan, Kunar, Afghanistan; Chitral, Pakistan
- Ethnicity: Nuristanis
- Native speakers: c. 214,000
- Linguistic classification: Indo-European: Indo-Iranian; Nuristani
- Proto-language: Proto-Nuristani
- Subdivisions: Katë; Prasun; Ashkun; Nuristani Kalasha; Tregami; Zemiaki

Language codes
- Glottolog: nuri1243
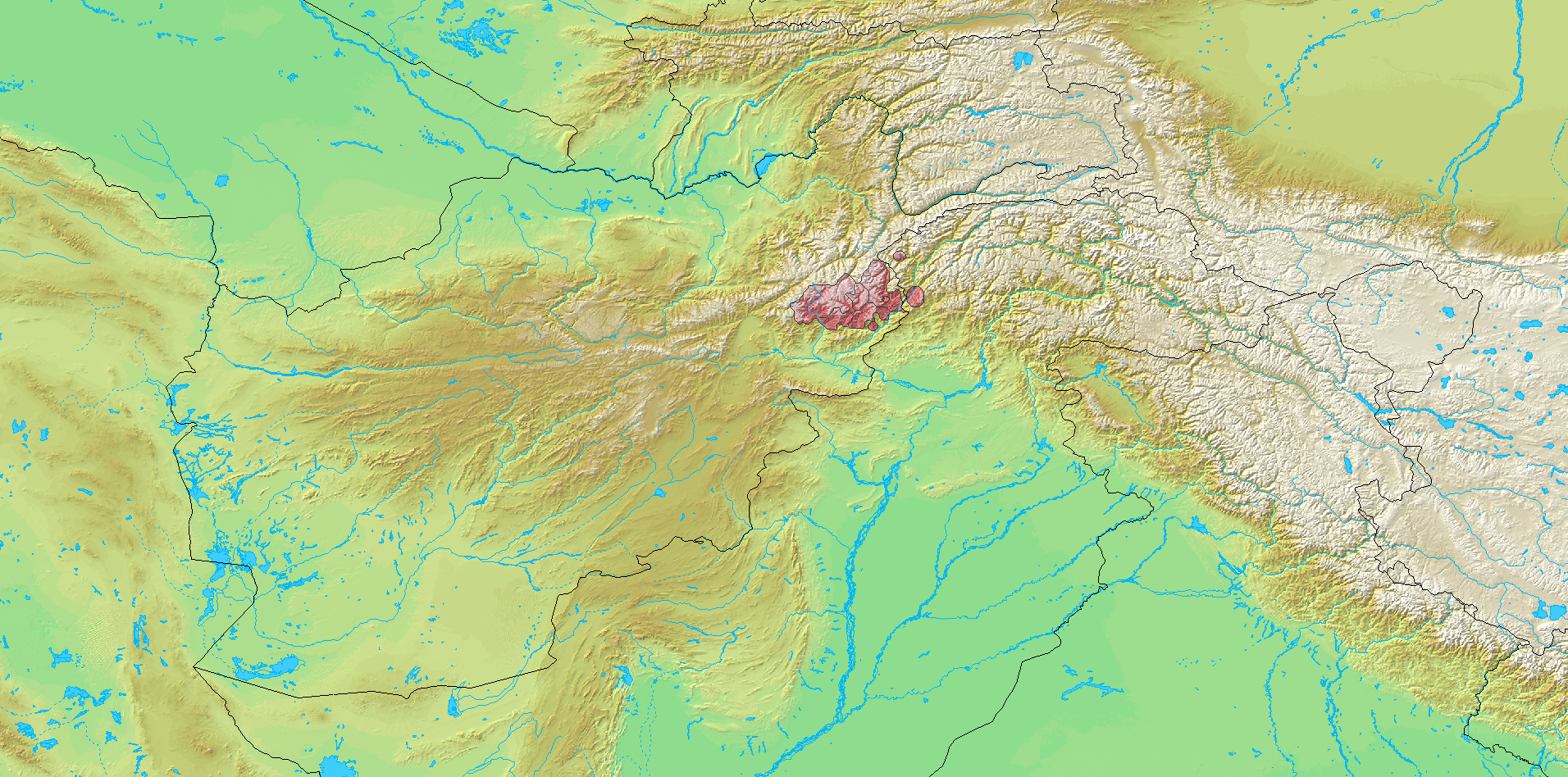
- Nuristan region, located in the southern range of the Hindu Kush

- Nuristan Province in modern-day Afghanistan, where most speakers live

The Nuristani languages, known earlier as Kafiri languages, are one of the three groups within the Indo-Iranian language family, alongside the Indo-Aryan and Iranian languages. They have approximately 214,000 speakers, primarily in Nuristan and Kunar provinces in northeastern Afghanistan and a few adjacent valleys in Khyber Pakhtunkhwa's Chitral District in Pakistan. The region inhabited by the Nuristanis is located in the southern Hindu Kush mountains and is drained by the Alingar River in the west, the Pech River in the center, and the Landai Sin and Kunar rivers in the east. More broadly, the Nuristan region is located at the northern intersection of the Indian subcontinent and the Iranian plateau.

The Nuristani languages were not described in literature until the 19th century. The older name for the region was Kafiristan, due to the pre-Islamic religious practices of its residents, but this term has been abandoned in favor of Nuristan ("land of light"), after the region's inhabitants converted to Islam.

== Languages ==
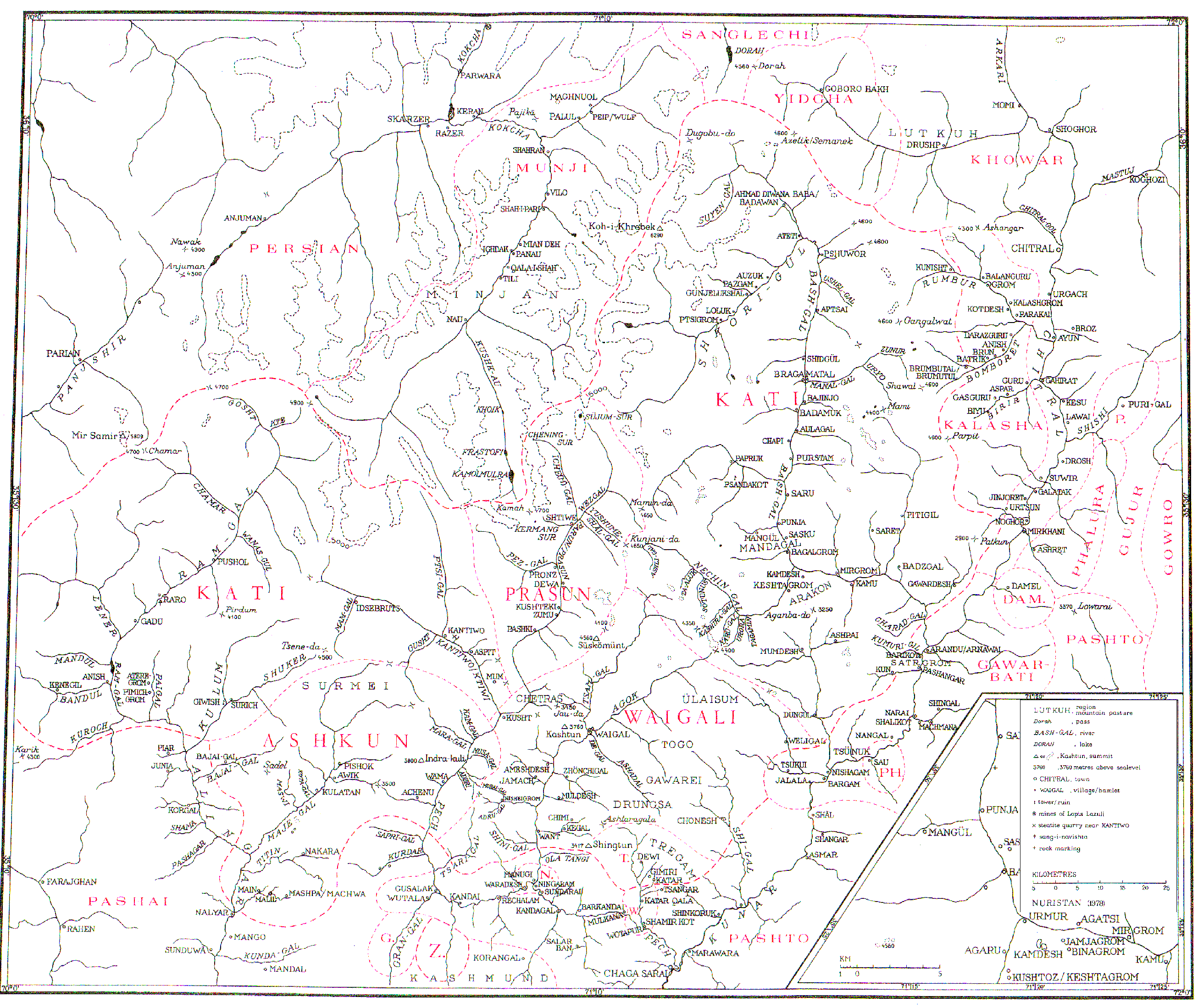
A map of Nuristani languages by Georg Morgenstierne

Nuristani languages can be classified into:

- Katë, also called Kati, Kamviri, or Kamkata-vari, is the most-spoken Nuristani language, at 150,000 users. It includes the Western, Northeastern, and Southeastern dialects.
- Prasun, also called Vasi-vari, is used by 8,000 speakers. Prasun is considered the most divergent member of the group, featuring a distinct grammar and phonology.
- Ashkun, also called Ashkunu or Sanu-viri, is used by 40,000 speakers. Although Ashkun shares commonalities with other Nuristani languages, it has some sound changes that are not shared by any other member.
- Nuristani Kalasha, formerly known as Waigali, is used by 12,000 speakers. It is rather closely related to Tregami and Zemiaki. Nuristani Kalasha is distinct from Kalasha-mun, which is an Indo-Aryan language.
- Tregami (lit. 'of three villages') is used by 3,500 speakers in the three villages of Gambir, Kaṭâr, and Devoz, in the Watapur District of Kunar Province, Afghanistan.
- Zemiaki is used by 500 speakers. It is so far the smallest Nuristani language known to exist. Local traditions confirm a historical link with Nuristani Kalasha.

== History ==
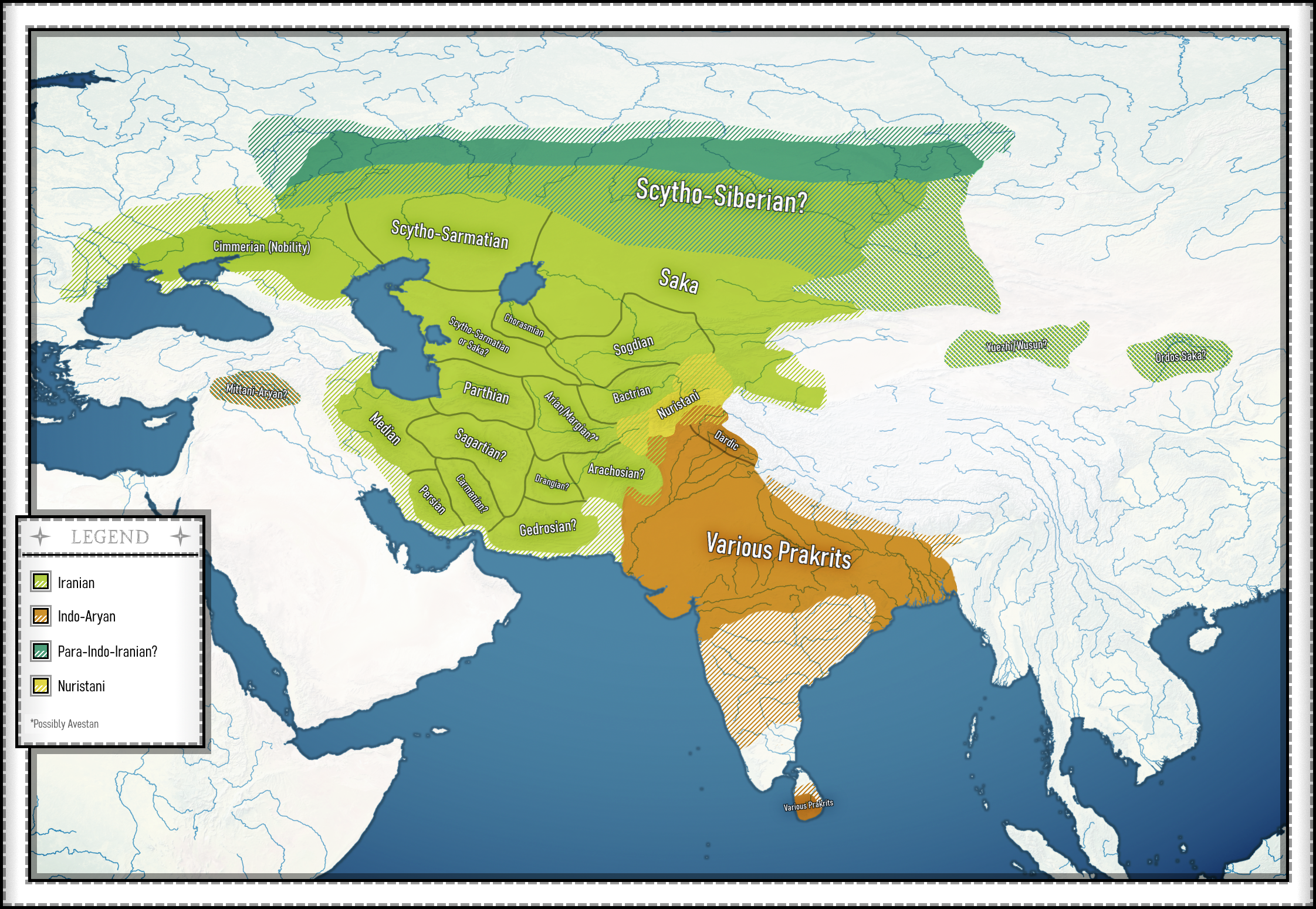
Map of attested and hypothetical ancient Indo-Iranian dialects. Nuristani languages are displayed in yellow, situated between the Iranian (in green) and Indo-Aryan languages (in orange).

Nuristani languages are Indo-European, ultimately descending from Proto-Indo-European. The prehistory of Nuristani is unclear, except that it apparently split off from the rest of the Indo-European languages as part of the Indo-Iranian branch.

The Proto-Indo-Iranian language of the late 3rd millennium BCE represents the reconstructed ancestral language that the Nuristani languages share with Sanskrit and Avestan as their common origin. This makes Nuristani languages closely related to Indo-Iranian languages like Hindustani and Persian, and more distantly related to other Indo-European languages like Lithuanian and Icelandic. Its classification within the Indo-Iranian branch was debated until recent scholarship settled its position as a third branch, distinct from Indo-Aryan or Iranian, though extensive Indo-Aryan influence can be detected.

Proto-Nuristani is the reconstructed ancestral language of all the modern-day Nuristani languages, representing the latest point at which they were still unified as a single language. Proto-Nuristani began breaking off into distinct languages around the 8th century BCE. The influences from surrounding Indo-Aryan and Iranian languages onto early Nuristani languages have been highly complex, due to different patterns of migration and settlement by various Nuristani-speaking tribes throughout their history.

The Nuristani languages continued their development as the primary languages of the Nuristani peoples, who maintained a history of interaction with surrounding Indo-Aryan peoples and later the Afghans, who became dominant in the area. In the 1890s, the region of Nuristan was finally incorporated into Afghanistan due to geopolitical pressure. Today, ethnic Nuristanis make up over 99% of the population of Nuristan. The Nuristani languages are spoken by about 78% of the total Nuristani population, and by 84% of villages.

Today, Indo-Aryan Dardic languages like Khowar, Pashai, and Kalasha-mun, and Eastern Iranian languages like Munji, Sanglechi, and Yidgha are natively spoken in the neighboring regions of Nuristan, leading to language contact. Dameli, a neighboring Indo-Aryan language, has a significant amount of vocabulary borrowed from Nuristani languages and thus was previously classified as a Nuristani language. However, the morphology and the pronominal system of Dameli are characteristically Indo-Aryan, leading to its re-classification as Dardic.

== Vocabulary ==
The oldest layer of the Nuristani lexicon is the common inheritance from Proto-Indo-European, shared with other Indo-European languages. For example, Tregami tre is cognate with English three, Russian три (tri), and Spanish tres.

Much of the Nuristani lexicon traces back to the Proto-Indo-Iranian language of the late 3rd millennium BCE (compare the Ashkun ćës—"markhor hair" and the Marathi kes—"hair"). Due to the relative isolation of the Nuristan region until the turn of the 20th century, the Nuristani languages were thought to have retained some inherited words from the ancient Indo-Iranian religion, predating Hinduism and Zoroastrianism. However, recent research on Nuristani theonyms shows robust semantic and linguistic correspondences with Indo-Aryan religious terminologies, which points to a significant post-Vedic Hindu influence on Nuristani theology and religious vocabulary. Remnants of inherited Indo-Iranian elements may have survived in some Prasun theonyms with hitherto unknown etymologies. In contrast, there is no trace of any Zoroastrian influence on Nuristani vocabulary, suggesting that Nuristani languages were not widely spoken in areas where Zoroastrianism was practiced.

Nuristani-speaking peoples have since long participated in enduring social contact with Indo-Aryan speakers, leading to a large number of early Indo-Aryan loanwards and relative semantic closeness among the shared cognates between Indo-Aryan and Nuristani languages. There have been important historical exchanges between the Nuristani religious practices and earlier forms of Hinduism. For instance, the Katë Indrë may be linked to the Hindu deity Indra, from which it derives the Katë indrõ—"rainbow" ("Indra's bow") and indrëṣ—"earthquake" ("Indra's impulse).

Middle Indo-Aryan languages like Gandhari have shared a broader cultural and linguistic milieu with Nuristani languages for many centuries in the Gandhara region. In addition, Nuristani languages borrowed words for "law" and "judge" from the Iranian Bactrian language around the 1st century CE, suggesting some degree of contact with Bactrian-speaking state institutions, possibly the Kushan Empire.

The chart below compares some basic vocabulary among the modern-day Nuristani languages.

English	Prasun	Katë	Ashkun	Nuristani Kalasha	Tregami
one	upün	ew	ac̣	ew	yo
two	lü	dyu, dü	du	dü	du
three	ćši	tre	trë	tre	tre
four	čpu	štëvo, što	ćatā	čatā	čātā
five	vuču	puč	põć	pũč	põč
six	vuṣ	ṣu	ṣo	ṣu	ṣu
seven	sëtë	sut	sōt	sot	sut
eight	astë	uṣṭ	ōṣṭ	oṣṭ	voṣṭ
nine	nu	nu	no	nu	nũ
ten	lezë	duć	dos	doš	dåš
eye	ižĩ	ačẽ	aćĩ	ačẽ	ac̣ĩ
tongue	luzuk	diz	žū	jip	jip
gut	vu	řu	ẓo	vřu	
name	nom	num	nām	nām	

== Syntax ==
Many Nuristani languages have subject–object–verb word order, like most other Indo-Iranian languages, and unlike the nearby Dardic Kashmiri language, which has verb-second word order.

=== Sample sentences ===
==== Katë ====
Vyé-r-p-amuř-e përdík vú-gayé
"The old woman from the bottom floor went upstairs. (Western dialect of Kulem)"

Kaṛv-ó ō či-pëlëŋé-di é-lë-ay
"Strong waters even go up the valley. (Northeastern dialect of Mumret)"

Tǘ ask-ḗ náčō-loš
"You should leave him alone. (Southeastern dialect of Kamdesh)"

==== Prasun ====
Lust lēnjǝwógnī oyinī́g naḍǝm rē-s
"Eating (a ritual dish) without having raised the hands (in pre-Islamic prayer) was unlawful/improper."

== See also ==
- Nuristani Swadesh lists

== Bibliography ==
- Decker, Kendall D. (1992). Languages of Chitral. In: Sociolinguistic Survey of Northern Pakistan 5. Islamabad: National Institute of Pakistan Studies, Quaid-i-Azam University and Summer Institute of Linguistics. ISBN 4-87187-520-2.
- Grjunberg, A. L. (1971). K dialektologii dardskich jazykov (glangali i zemiaki). Indijskaja i iranskaja filologija: Voprosy dialektologii. Moscow.
- Jakob Halfmann (2023). Lād "law": a Bactrian loanword in the Nuristani languages, in Bulletin of the School of Oriental and African Studies, London, United Kingdom.
- Morgenstierne, Georg (1926). Report on a Linguistic Mission to Afghanistan. Instituttet for Sammenlignende Kulturforskning, Serie C I-2. Oslo. ISBN 0-923891-09-9.
- Jettmar, Karl (1985). Religions of the Hindu Kush ISBN 0-85668-163-6
- Mallory, J. P. In Search of the Indo-Europeans: Language, Archaeology and Myth. Thames and Hudson, 1989.
- Mallory, James P.; Adams, Douglas Q. "Indo-Iranian Languages". In: Encyclopedia of Indo-European Culture. Fitzroy Dearborn, 1997.
- Strand, Richard F. "Nurestâni Languages" in Encyclopædia Iranica
- Strand, Richard F. "– Kâmboǰâs and Sakas in the Holly-Oak Mountains.pdf"
