= Pesawur =

Pesawur Pashto: پښاور Kata-vari: پݜاور
- Village
- Location within Afghanistan
- Coordinates: 35°50′00″N 71°21′00″E
- Country: Afghanistan
- Province: Nuristan
- District: Bargi Matal District
- Time zone: UTC+04:30 (AFT)

Pesawur is a village in Afghanistan's Nuristan Province. It is close to Peshwar a town with the same name. Most people are Nuristani people.
