= Peshawar (disambiguation) =

Peshawar is the capital of the Khyber Pakhtunkhwa province of Pakistan.

Peshawar may also refer to:

== Places ==
- Peshawar, Afghanistan, a village
- Peshawar District, Khyber Pakhtunkhwa, Pakistan
- Peshawar Cantonment, in Peshawar city, Khyber Pakhtunkhwa, Pakistan

== Other uses ==
- Peshawar Zalmi, a Pakistani cricket franchise
- Peshawar cricket team
- Abdur Rahman Peshawari (1886–1925), Turkish soldier, journalist and diplomat

== See also ==
- Capture of Peshawar (disambiguation)
- Peshawar attack (disambiguation)
- Peshawari (disambiguation)
- Pesawur, a village in Afghanistan
