= Bagalgrom =

Bagalgrom (also known as Mumar) is a village in the Bashgal Valley of Nuristan, Afghanistan.

Bagalgrom is the primary village of the Mumo tribe. Their language is Mumviri, a dialect of the Kamkata-viri language. The 1911 Encyclopædia Britannica referred to Bagalgrom as "chief village of the Madugal kaffirs"
