= Parun (disambiguation) =

Parun is a small town in Afghanistan.

Parun or Prasun may also refer to:

- Parun District, Afghanistan
- Wasi-wari or Prasun language, a language spoken in Afghanistan
