= Great Gish =

Nuristani god

Gish or Great Gish (Kamkata-vari: Giṣ/Gaviṣ, Kati: Giwīṣ, Gyīṣ, Waigali: Giwiš, Prasun: Gīṣ) was the most popular god of Nuristani mythology and received the greatest amount of attention among the Siah-Posh Nuristani of Bashgul. Every village of Bashgul had one or more shrines dedicated to him. In the Nuristani pantheon, Gish ranked next to Moni who was said to be the chief prophet of Imra. Both Moni and Gish were created by Imra by his breath.

Gish was the war-god. Countless bulls and billy goats were sacrificed each year to him and the drums were beaten in his honor for fifteen continuous days, every spring, by the Nuristani slaves.

== Etymology ==
According to Richard Strand, in his Nuristâni Etymological Lexicon, it is related to the Sanskrit word gavíṣ/gaviṣá "desire for cows; eager", an epithet of Indra (with which he is functionally equivalent), in turn from Proto-Indo-Iranian *gawHíšHs, with a later shift in meaning to "war".

Cognates of Kamkata-vari giṣ/gaviṣ include Ashkun gavīṣ and Waigali geṣ. The presence of a retroflex ṣ indicates that the name was borrowed from Sanskrit.

== Mythology ==
Giwish was born of his mother who was pregnant with him for eighteen months before breaking out of her navel. According to Čanlū of Urtsun, Gish/Giz's mothers was Outhiz (also known as Utr). Imra had ordered the unwed Outhiz to be pregnant. While Outhiz was pregnant with Giz, they would have conversations with each other, and when Outhiz was eighteen months pregnant she asked Giz to come out and be born but Giz refused. Then Outhiz planted a walnut tree with eighteen branches that grew as tall as the sky. She told Giz to come out and see this magnificent tree, hearing which Giz burst out of his mothers navel. Sitting in a chair, he sewed her stomach back up with a steel needle and used a medicine to regenerate her. Outhiz now seeing that the walnut tree's branches had bent over, used iron pillars to hold them up. The tree eventually produced 720 maunds of walnuts, which along with other foods Giz used to feed his army. Once the army was fed, they attacked Sami. During the war, Giz struck his spear to a rock to transform it into a mountain, blocking the enemy from chasing them. When they reached the Bashgal river, Giz told his army to sacrifice a hornless bull, upon which a bridge appeared. When the exhausted army reached a plain, Giz struck his spear into the ground, causing sweet roots to grow. Eventually Sami and his followers were killed and his wealth plundered. After the way, Giz became known as "Laymoch". One day he went to Parun and bellowed like a bullock, he then bellowed at a pasture in Poroidur, and finally on Atser ridge. Since then he was never seen amongst the people.

Gish's consort was Sanjü, daughter of the god Sanu. Sanu was a Muslim who tried to convert the Kafirs to Islam, but was killed by Gish who proceeded to play polo with his head.

Ibbetson records that some say Gish's earthly name was Yazid. He also mentions that Gish is stated to have killed Ali, Hasan and Husain and nearly every famous Muslim known to the Kāfirs.

Robertson reports a local belief that Gish had no mother and instead came into being directly through Imra's word, living afterward as a man defined by his fighting and dying, fittingly, in combat. A related tradition holds that once he had killed Ali, Gish treated the head as a plaything in a game resembling the polo later favored by Chitrali royalty, who practiced a faith akin to those of the Kāfirs.

== Worship ==
Gish was worshipped through animal sacrifice (restricted to male bulls and goats) at shrines found in most villages, with Kamdesh notable for concentrating its offerings at a single site rather than the two maintained elsewhere. A temple near Kamdesh, seasonally sealed and reopened, displayed war trophies on its corner posts and stood beside a smaller shrine to Moni.

Annual observances included extended periods of ritual drumming (notably in September and during spring) and dances performed by warriors after successful raids. Robertson, who witnessed one such spring observance in 1891, described a priest regarded as possessed by Gish leading a village procession involving ritual bell-carrying and goat sacrifice.

== In popular culture ==
In John Updike's 1965 short story "God Speaks" (collected in "Museums and Women") Gish Imra is the name of one of the protagonists, the son of the assassinated leader of a Central Asian state called Nuristan.

== See also ==
- Indra
- Susanoo-no-Mikoto
- List of war deities
- Yazid I
