= Nuristan National Park =

National park in Afghanistan

- IUCN category II (national park)
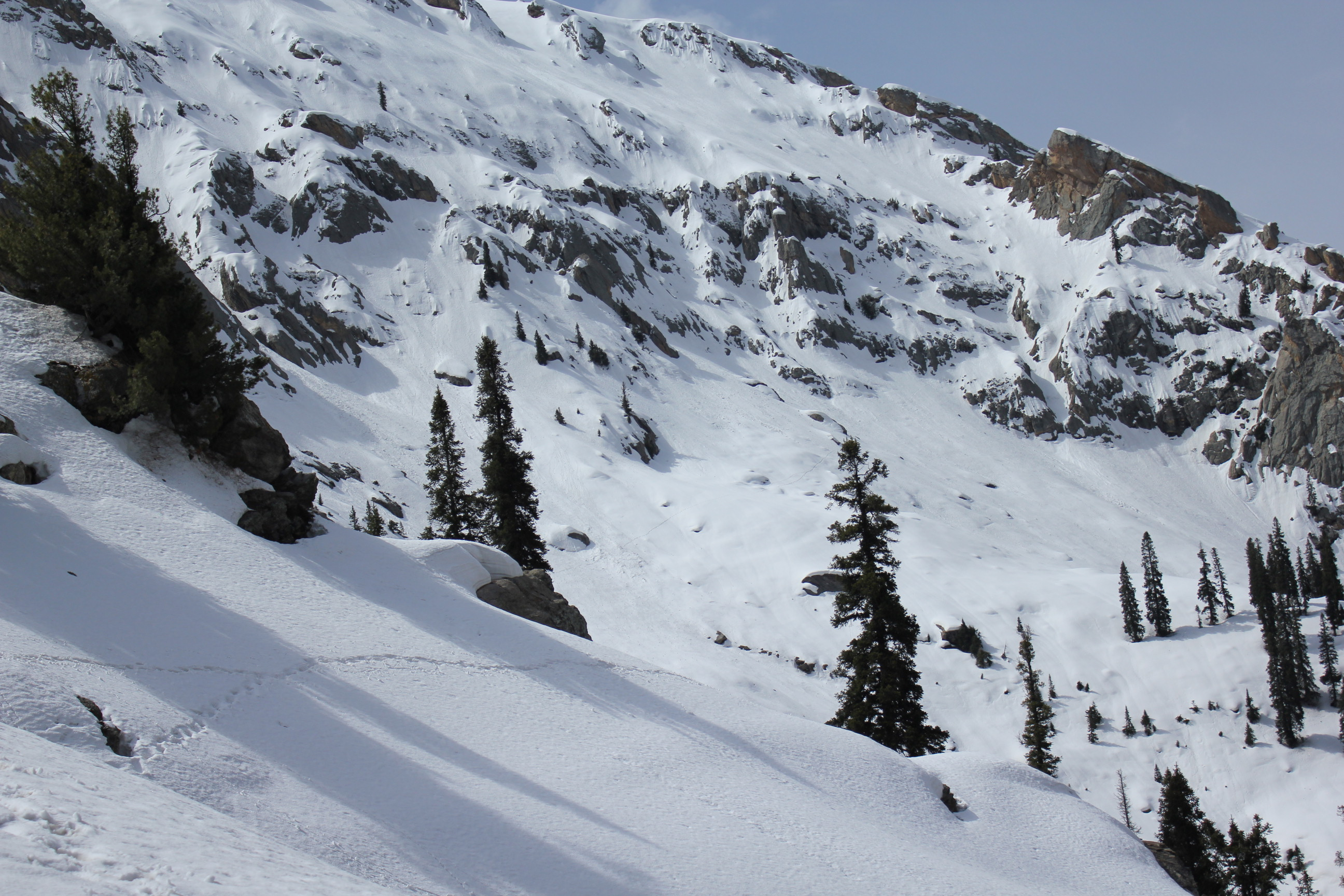
- Nuristan Province in winter

- Location within Afghanistan
- Interactive map of Nuristan National Park
- Location: Nuristan Province, Afghanistan
- Coordinates: 35°12′N 70°42′E
- Area: 5,733.07 km^{2} (2,213.55 sq mi)
- Established: 5 June 2020
- Governing body: Ministry of Agrictulture, Livestock and Irrigation (MAIL) and Communities

Nuristan National Park is a national park in Afghanistan announced by the Government of Afghanistan on 5 June 2020 (coinciding with World Environment Day), making it the third in the country after Band-e Amir National Park and Wakhan National Park. The Park comprises the entire mountainous eastern Province of Nuristan, which borders Pakistan. According to the FAO, a detailed management plan - and "gazettement" - is still forthcoming. The closest city to the national park is Parun, which is the capital of Nuristan.

== History ==
An initial proposal was drafted in 1981, with Nuristan National Park to be formed in what was then Laghman Province and Kunar Province (Nuristan Province was not created, by carving out areas of these two provinces, until July 1988); the report highlighted what were then the "largely undisturbed monsoon-influenced forests", as well as the assemblage of species living therein, including the leopard, snow leopard, Himalayan black bear, and markhor, combined with the traditional way of life of the local communities.

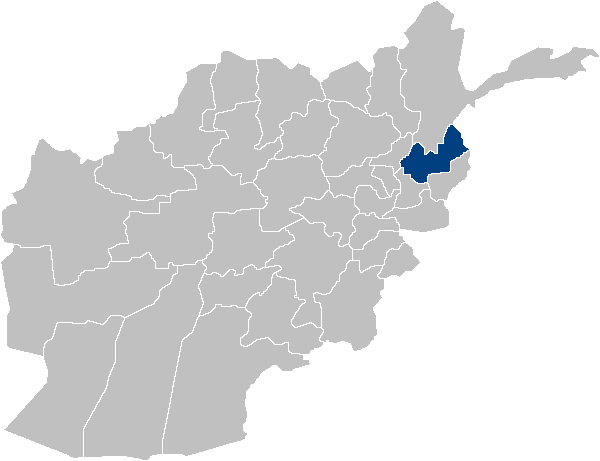
Area of Nuristan Province in blue.

Although a 2003 UNEP report suggested that 52% of forest cover in Nuristan, Laghman, and Nangahar Provinces was lost between 1977 and 2002, and the National Environmental Protection Agency warned a decade later of continuing illegal logging, a 2008 Wildlife Conservation Society report confirmed the continuing presence of the bear and leopard cat, alongside the grey wolf, golden jackal, yellow-throated marten, and crested porcupine, with of a number of other felids reported by interviewees. The area also includes part of the Pech and Waygal valleys Important Bird Area, with at least fifty-three breeding species of bird.

== See also ==
- List of protected areas of Afghanistan
- Tourism in Afghanistan
- Wildlife of Afghanistan
