= Dogan (deity) =

Kafiristan deity

Dogan (also known as Deguen) is a deity mentioned in historical accounts of the traditional religion of the Siyah-Posh people of Kafiristan, a region in present-day Nuristan, Afghanistan. The Siyah-Posh practised a polytheistic religion centred on the worship of Imra, regarded as their supreme god. Their religious traditions included the veneration of deities and ancestral figures represented by wooden idols. These beliefs persisted until the Afghan conquest of Kafiristan in 1895–1896, after which the population was converted to Islam.

== History ==
The Siyah Posh ("black-clad") took their name from the black goatskin clothing they wore. Early European accounts describe them as acknowledging a supreme deity, Imra, while also venerating many idols said to represent great men of the past, who were believed to intercede with the deity on behalf of worshippers. Some sources give the name of the Kafirs' principal god as Imra or Deguen, so the deity appears under varying names in the literature.

The traditional religion ended after Emir Abdur Rahman Khan conquered Kafiristan in 1895–96, when its people were obliged to abandon their ancient beliefs for Islam. The region was renamed Nuristan, "land of light." Wooden statues of ancestors and of animistic and polytheistic divinities, brought back by the Emir's forces, were later housed in the National Museum in Kabul.

== Mythology ==
The Siyah Posh, or "black-robed" Kafirs, consisted of one very large and widely spread tribe, the Katirs, and four much smaller communities: the Kam, the Madugalis, the Kashtan (or Kashtoz) and the Gourdesh. Later accounts describe the Kafirs' religion as polytheistic, with a supreme deity named Mara or Imra and many lesser gods and goddesses known locally by names such as Mandi or Moni, Wushum or Shomde, Gish or Giwish, Bagisht, Indr, Züzum, Disani and Kshumai. The 1911 Encyclopædia Britannica adds that tribal, family and household deities had to be propitiated, and that mischievous spirits and fairies were believed to haunt the land. In that account, Imra was the Creator, and all other supernatural powers were subordinate to him.

Imra, Gish and Moni were each honored with a separate little temple, as usually was the goddess Disani, while three or four of the other deities would share one building, each looking out of a small separate square window. According to Encyclopaedia Iranica, the Kafirs were preoccupied with the upper world, which they pictured as ruled by a multitude of often quarrelsome deities and giants (yush), as told in numerous long myths. The temple of Mara at Kushteki, in the center of its valley, was by far the largest religious building in Kafiristan. The Scottish administrator George Scott Robertson saw it but did not enter it during his stay in Kafiristan in 1890–91. Robertson's The Kafirs of the Hindu Kush, published in London in 1896, remains the only detailed description of the Kafirs, and it appeared in the same year as the region's conquest and forced conversion to Islam.
