= Ilias Javed =

Bangladeshi actor and choreographer (1944–2026)

- ইলিয়াস জাবেদ
- Born: Raja Mohammad Ilias; 1944; Peshawar, Afghanistan
- Died: 21 January 2026 (aged 82); Dhaka, Bangladesh
- Occupations: Actor; choreographer
- Spouse: Dolly Chowdhury (m. 1984)

Ilias Javed (1944 – 21 January 2026), known professionally as Javed, was a Bangladeshi actor and choreographer who predominantly worked in Bangladeshi cinema. He acted in more than 200 films which include Nishan, Payel, and Maleka Banu.

== Early life ==
Javed was born as Raja Mohammad Ilias in Peshawar, Afghanistan in 1944. His father was Raja Muhammad Afzan. Subsequently, he with his family moved to British Indian province of Punjab. In 1963, Javed moved to Dacca, then part of East Pakistan (present-day Bangladesh). Filmmaker Mustafizul Haq gave him the screen name Javed.

== Career ==
Javed started his film career as a dance director in the 1960s. His first assignment as a choreographer was for "Malan", the Urdu-language film, directed by Kaiser Pasha. At the age of 14, he made his acting debut by his performance in the Urdu film Nayi Zindagi which was released in 1964. He learnt dance from the notable dancer Birju Maharaj.

He got his breakthrough in the film Payel, directed by Mustafizul Haq, released on January 30 in 1970.

Javed's most frequent notable co-actor was Anju Ghosh.

== Personal life and death ==
Javed married actress Dolly Chowdhury on 12 January 1984. They met on the set of the film Chandan Dwiper Rajkonnya. He suffered from cancer and died at his Uttara residence, on 21 January 2026, at the age of 82.

== Filmography ==
- Osru Diye Lekha (1972)
- Badhu Biday (1978)
- Rajanigandha (1982)
- Chandon Diper Rajkonna (1984)
- Rajlokkhi Srikanto (1987)
- Goriber Bou (1990)
- Chandni Raatey (1993)
- Tomake Chai (1996)
- Nachnewali (2001)
- Kheya Ghater Majhi (2003)
