= Dowab District =

Dowab
- District
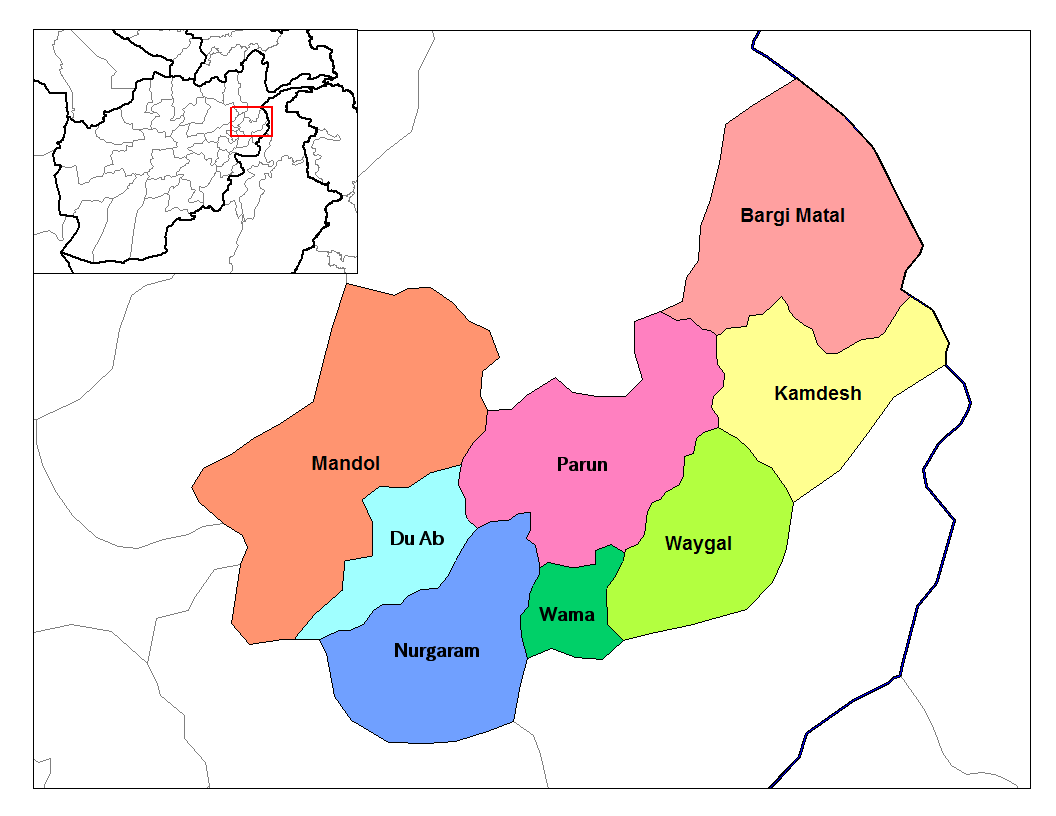
- Dowab shown in turquoise (color)

- Location within Afghanistan
- Coordinates: 35°12′50″N 70°22′24″E
- Country: Afghanistan
- Province: Nuristan Province

Population (2023)
  - Total: 7,700
- Time zone: UTC+04:30 (Afghanistan Time)

Dowab, also spelled Doab, or Du Ab, is one of the districts of Nuristan Province in Afghanistan. It has a population of about 7,700 residents. They are mostly farmers, herders, traders, and shopkeepers.

Dowab is located in the western part of Nuristan province, surrounded by Mandol District in the north and west; Parun District in the northeast; Nurgaram District in the southeast; and Panjshir Province in the south.

== See also ==
- Districts of Afghanistan
