= Nuristan District =

Nuristan District was a district in eastern Afghanistan. It was originally in Laghman Province and then was moved to the new Nuristan Province in 2001. In 2004 it was divided into Du Ab District and Nurgram District, and ceased to exist.
