= Coleophora aegra =

Scientific classification
- Kingdom: Animalia
- Phylum: Arthropoda
- Class: Insecta
- Order: Lepidoptera
- Family: Coleophoridae
- Genus: Coleophora
- Species: C. aegra

Binomial name
- Coleophora aegra Meyrick, 1917

Species of moth

Coleophora aegra is a moth of the family Coleophoridae. It is found in northern Pakistan (Abbottabad and Murree) and Afghanistan (Nuristan).

The wingspan is 10–11 mm.
