= Wama District =

Wama
- District
- Location within Afghanistan
- Coordinates: 35°11′00″N 70°48′00″E
- Country: Afghanistan
- Province: Nuristan Province

Population (2010)
  - Total: 10,800

Wama District (Ashkun: Sâma, Pashto: واما ولسوالۍ, Persian: ولسوالی واما) is a district of Nuristan Province in Afghanistan. In the 2004 Afghanistan administrative reorganization it lost territory to the newly created Nurgram and Parun districts.
