= Capture of Peshawar =

Capture of Peshawar may refer to these battles in Peshawar:

- Battle of Peshawar (1001), fought between Mahmud of Ghazni and Jayapala
- Stratagem of Peshawar (1818), fought between the Afghans and the Tanolis
- Capture of Peshawar (1834), fought between the Sikh Empire and Peshawar Sardars

== See also ==
- Peshawar (disambiguation)
- Operations against the Mohmands, Bunerwals and Swatis in 1915, in Peshawar in the Asian and Pacific theatre of World War I
