= Dogan =

Dogan may refer to:

- Dogan, English and Irish surname
- Dogan, a type of building that occurs frequently in Stephen King's fantasy series The Dark Tower.
- Doğan, Turkish surname and masculine first name
- Dogan, ethnic slur
- Dogan people, an African tribe living near Timbuktu
- Dogan (deity), a deity

== See also ==
- Dōgen Zenji (道元禅師), a 13th-century Japanese Buddhist priest
