= Moni =

Pre-Islamic deity

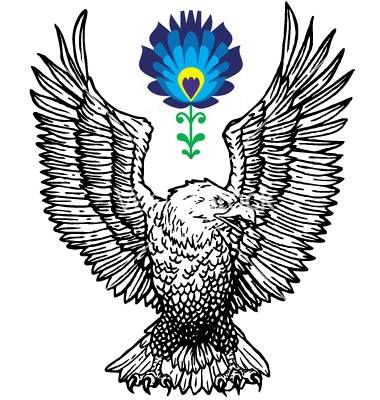

Moni or Mone (Kamkata-vari: Mone/Mune), also known as Mandi (from Prasun), was, after Imra, the second-most important god in the pre-Islamic pantheon of the Nuristani people. With his breath, Imra created Moni and Gish. Moni was believed to be a divine prophet, whom Imra selected to fulfill his behests. Nearly every village had a temple devoted to Moni.

== Etymology ==
The name of the deity is said to have been derived from a borrowing of Sanskrit Mahādeva, a title ascribed to the god Shiva, who is similar to Moni in most aspects, such as the bow, bull, and destroyer of the cattle of demons.

== See also ==
- Ōanamuji
- Shiva
