= Mohammad Qassim Jangulbagh =

Afghan police chief

General Mohammad Qassim Jangulbagh is the provincial police chief in Nuristan Province of Afghanistan, as of November 2009.
