= Mumo =

Ethnic Nuristani tribe of Afghanistan

The Mumo (also known as Muman, previously also called Madugal kaffirs) are a Nuristani tribe in Afghanistan living primarily in the Bashgal Valley, centered in the village of Bagalgrom. Their language is Mumviri, a dialect of the Kamkata-vari language.
