= Parun =

Administrative center of Nuristan Province, Afghanistan

Parun پارون
- Provincial capital
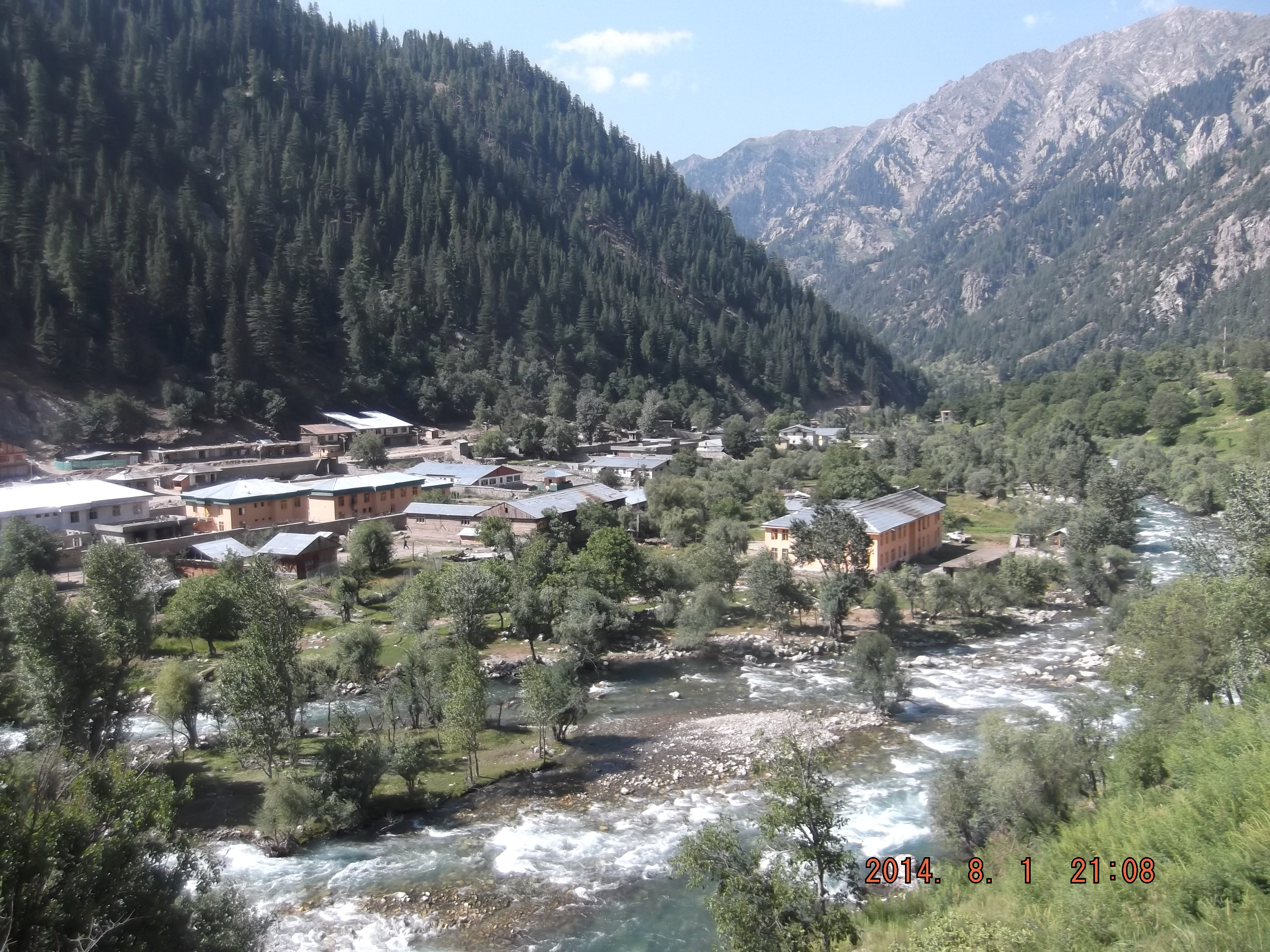
- View of Parun in 2014

- Location in Afghanistan
- Coordinates: 35°25′0″N 70°55′01″E
- Country: Afghanistan
- Province: Nuristan
- District: Parun

Government
  - Type: Municipality

Area
  - Land: 4 km^{2} (1.5 sq mi)
- Elevation: 2,265 m (7,431 ft)

Population (2025)
  - Provincial capital: 11,563
  - Density: 2,900/km^{2} (7,500/sq mi)
  - Rural: 11,563
- Time zone: UTC+04:30 (Afghanistan Time)
- ISO 3166 code: AF-PAR

Parun or Paroon (Pashto (Note: Pashto pronunciation: [pɑˈrun]); Dari (Note: Dari pronunciation: [pʰɑːˈɾuːn]): پارون), historically called Prasun and Prasungul, is a town in eastern Afghanistan, serving as the capital of Nuristan Province. It is within the jurisdiction of Parun District and has an estimated population of 11,563 people.

Parun is home to Nuristan University, which has about 400 students. The town is near the Nuristan National Park, which is one of the major tourist attractions in Afghanistan. It is surrounded by the Kuran wa Munjan District of Badakshan Province and the other districts of Nuristan. The town covers a land area of 4 km^{2} (1.5 sq mi) or 350 ha (860 acres).

The nearest city to Parun is Asadabad to the southeast in neighboring Kunar Province, which can be reached by the main road. There is also a road in the western Mandol District of Nuristan that leads into Panjshir Province.

== Geography ==
Parun is located in the eastern Nuristan Province of Afghanistan, in a remote area of the Hindu Kush mountain range near the Nuristan National Park. It is predominantly forested (54%) and agricultural land (33%). Built-up land accounts for about 7% of total land use. But unlike many other cities, Parun does not have any barren land and only 4 ha (9.9 acres) of vacant plots. Car accidents are regular in the area due to bad roads, which the government is currently busy trying to improve.

Parun has around 6 villages: Ishtewi, Pronz, Dewa, Kushteki, Tsutsum and Pashki. They are located over a distance of 20 km (12 mi) from north to south along the Parun River. Ishtewi, the upper village, lies at an altitude of 2,850 m (9,350 ft) above sea level, while Pashki, the lowest village, lies at 2,500 m (8,200 ft) above sea level.

=== Climate ===
Under the Köppen climate classification, Parun has a subarctic climate (Dsc). The average temperature for the year in Parun is 1.2 °C (34.2 °F). The warmest month, on average, is July with an average temperature of 11.7 °C (53.1 °F), while the coldest month on average is January, with an average temperature of −11.1 °C (12.0 °F). It receives heavy snow as early as in the month of December.

Climate data for Parun
Month	Jan	Feb	Mar	Apr	May	Jun	Jul	Aug	Sep	Oct	Nov	Dec	Year
Daily mean °C (°F)	−11.1 (12.0)	−9.5 (14.9)	−4.8 (23.4)	0.7 (33.3)	4.5 (40.1)	9.6 (49.3)	11.7 (53.1)	11.3 (52.3)	7.9 (46.2)	3.1 (37.6)	−2.3 (27.9)	−7 (19)	1.2 (34.1)
Average precipitation mm (inches)	83.0 (3.27)	113.8 (4.48)	154.0 (6.06)	147.0 (5.79)	103.3 (4.07)	33.5 (1.32)	44.5 (1.75)	44.3 (1.74)	20.7 (0.81)	35.7 (1.41)	55.1 (2.17)	82.2 (3.24)	917.1 (36.11)
Average relative humidity (%)	57.1	60.9	60.1	60.0	56.0	46.0	48.4	50.3	48.1	47.5	46.8	51.9	52.8
Source: Weatherbase

== Demographics ==
Parun has an estimated population of 11,563 people. They are mostly the native Nuristanis followed by Pashtuns and others. Because Afghans from all across the country visit the city, it would be expected to hear members of all ethnic groups speaking in their language. Pashto and Dari are the official languages of Afghanistan. In addition to these two, people of Nuristan normally use their native Nuristani languages when communicating with each other. The Gujars also speak their native Gujari language.

== See also ==
- List of cities in Afghanistan
- Tourism in Afghanistan
