= Barg-i Matal District =

Bargi Matal
- District
- Location within Afghanistan
- Coordinates: 35°46′30″N 71°15′10″E
- Country: Afghanistan
- Province: Nuristan

Population (2010)
  - Total: 15,000

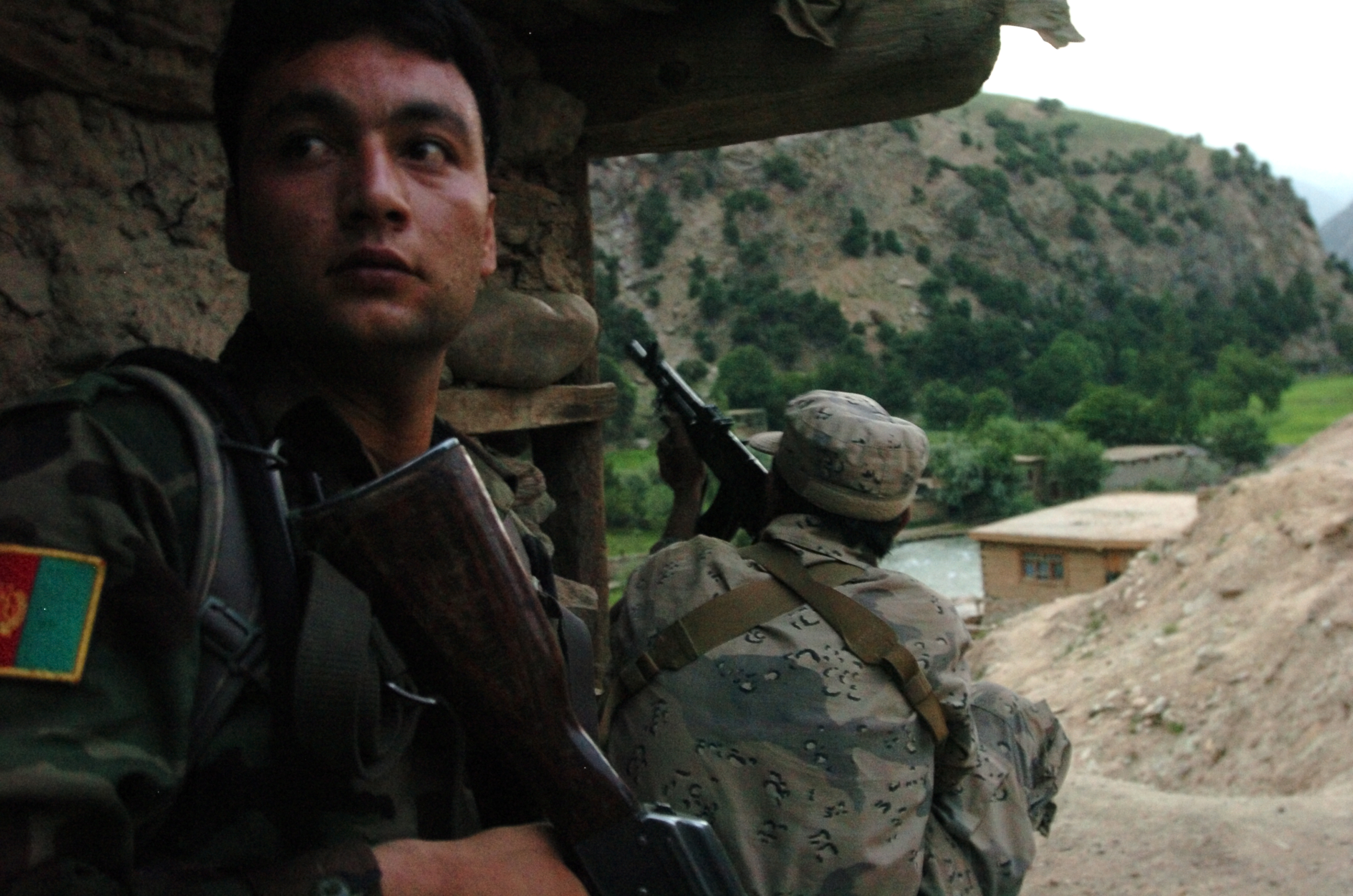
Afghan soldiers fighting in Bargi Matal in 2009

Bargi Matal District (Barge Matal District, Bragamatal District, Kamkata-vari: břagamâṭol, Pashto: برګ مټال ولسوالۍ, Persian: ولسوالی برگ متال) is a district of Nuristan Province, Afghanistan. It was originally in Konarha Province (Konar Province) and then was moved to the newly created Nuristan Province in 2001.

== Climate ==
Bargi Matal has a subarctic climate (Köppen: Dsc), resulting in long, cold winters and short, mild summers.

Climate data for Barg-i Matal, Nuristan Province
Month	Jan	Feb	Mar	Apr	May	Jun	Jul	Aug	Sep	Oct	Nov	Dec	Year
Mean daily maximum °C (°F)	−5.8 (21.6)	−5.0 (23.0)	−0.2 (31.6)	5.9 (42.6)	10.2 (50.4)	15.9 (60.6)	18.2 (64.8)	18.0 (64.4)	14.9 (58.8)	9.3 (48.7)	2.9 (37.2)	−2.8 (27.0)	6.8 (44.2)
Daily mean °C (°F)	−10.5 (13.1)	−9.1 (15.6)	−4.2 (24.4)	1.5 (34.7)	5.4 (41.7)	10.5 (50.9)	12.8 (55.0)	12.5 (54.5)	8.9 (48.0)	3.9 (39.0)	−1.7 (28.9)	−6.6 (20.1)	2.0 (35.5)
Mean daily minimum °C (°F)	−15.2 (4.6)	−13.3 (8.1)	−8.2 (17.2)	−2.9 (26.8)	0.6 (33.1)	5.1 (41.2)	7.4 (45.3)	7.0 (44.6)	3.0 (37.4)	−1.5 (29.3)	−6.3 (20.7)	−10.5 (13.1)	−2.9 (26.8)
Average precipitation mm (inches)	73 (2.9)	100 (3.9)	137 (5.4)	129 (5.1)	92 (3.6)	32 (1.3)	41 (1.6)	41 (1.6)	20 (0.8)	35 (1.4)	50 (2.0)	74 (2.9)	824 (32.5)
Average relative humidity (%)	57	60	59	58	54	44	47	49	47	47	47	52	52
Source: weather2visit.com

== Boundaries ==
Bargi Matal District is bounded by:

- Kuran wa Munjan District of Badakhshan Province to the west and northwest,
- Chitral District of Khyber-Pakhtunkhwa Province, Pakistan, to the northeast and east,
- Kamdesh District to the south, and
- Parun District to the southwest.

== See also ==
- Peshawar, Afghanistan, a settlement in the district
