= Mandol District =

Mandol ولسوالی مندول / مندول ولسوالۍ
- District
- Location within Afghanistan
- Coordinates: 35°24′00″N 70°15′00″E
- Country: Afghanistan
- Province: Nuristan Province

Population
  - Estimate (2025): 24,326
- Time zone: UTC+04:30 (Afghanistan Time)

Mandol District (Pashto: مندول ولسوالۍ, Dari: ولسوالی مندول) is one of the districts of Nuristan Province in eastern Afghanistan. It has an estimated population of 24,326 people. A 2010 estimate had put the population at 19,200 people.

Mandol District is surrounded by Badakhshan Province in the north and northeast, Parun District in the east, Dowab District in the southeast, Laghman Province in the south, and Panjshir Province in the west. It was originally within the jurisdiction of Laghman Province and then placed in the jurisdiction of the newly created Nuristan Province in 2001. There is a road that connects it to neighboring Panjshir Province.

== See also ==
- Districts of Afghanistan
