= Nurgaram District =

Nurgaram
- District
- Location within Afghanistan
- Coordinates: 35°05′00″N 70°28′00″E
- Country: Afghanistan
- Province: Nuristan Province

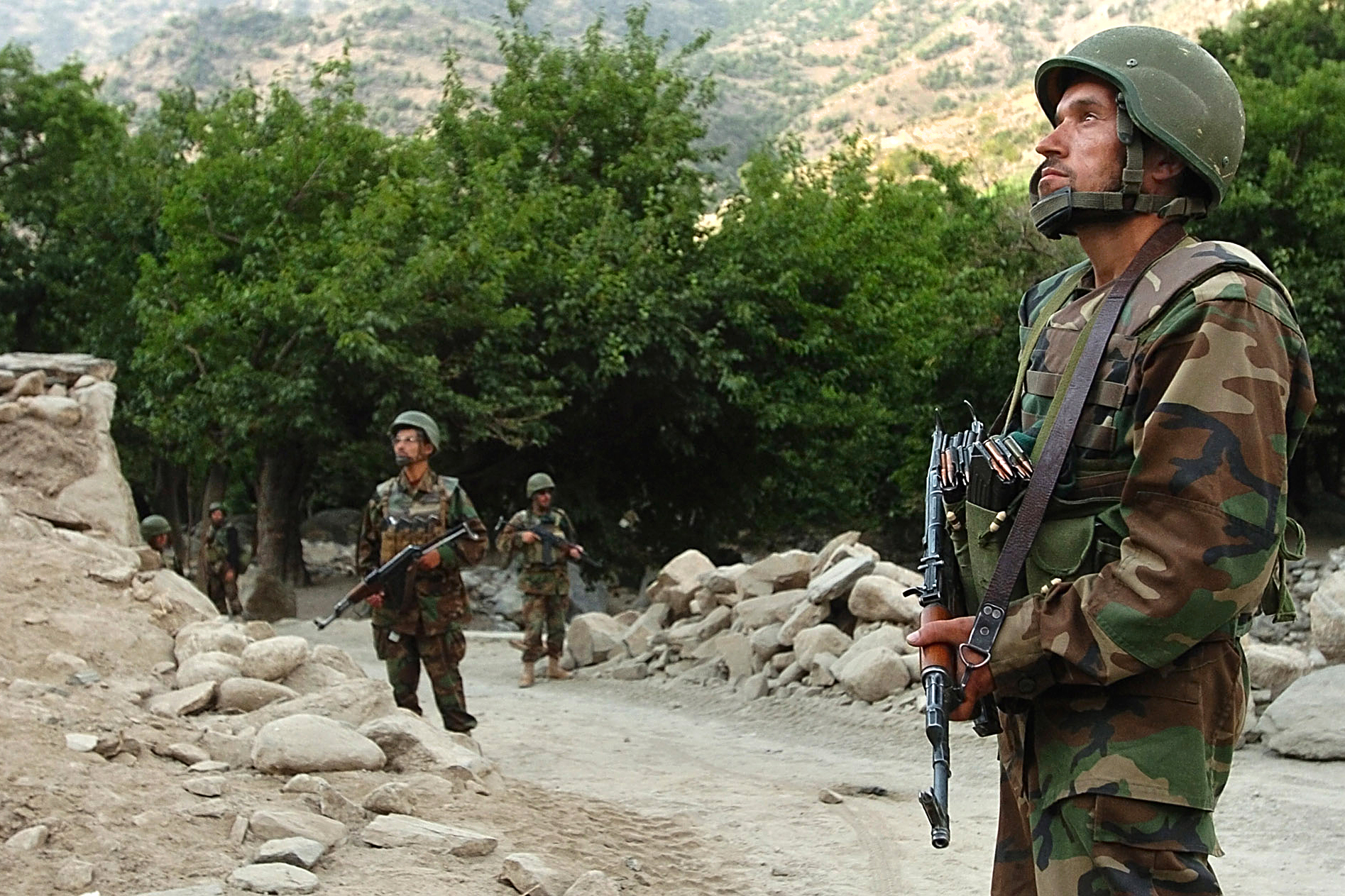
Afghan soldiers patrol Wadawu Valley in 2009

Nurgaram District, also known as Nechegram in all Nuristani languages and Neishigram in Waigali, (Pashto: نورگرام ولسوالۍ, Persian: ولسوالی نورگرام) is a district of Nuristan Province in Afghanistan, which was established in the 2004 Afghanistan administrative reorganization out of parts of Nuristan District and Wama District.

== History ==
On 16 May 2023, Pashayi tribesmen organised a protest in the Nurgaram district of Nuristan against the Taliban against alleged mistreatment and ethnic discrimination under the local Taliban commander, Mawlawi Saadullah, resulting in clashes although no deaths or injuries were reported.
