= Peshawari (disambiguation) =

Peshawari is a person or item that is associated with Peshawar, a city in Pakistan.

Peshawari may also refer to:

- Peshawari (people), or Hindkowans
- Peshawari chappal, traditional footwear
- Peshawari turban, traditional headwear
- Peshawari naan, style of bread

== People ==
- Abdur Rahman Peshawari (1886–1925), Turkish soldier, journalist and diplomat
- Uzair Gul Peshawari (1886-1989), Islamic scholar and freedom activist

== See also ==
- Peshawar (disambiguation)
