= Imra =

Nuristani god

Imra (Kati: Imro) was the chief creator deity of the Nuristanis before their conversion to Islam. Imra was believed to be the creator of the earth. With his breath, it was believed, he created the three other main deities of the pantheon: Mon, Gish and Bagisht.

== Etymology ==
The name of the deity is considered a reflex of Indo-Iranian Yama. The name Imro or Yum in Kamkata-vari is thought to derive from a borrowing of Sanskrit Yama-rāja "King Yama" via a Middle Indo-Aryan form *Yam(a)rāy(a) with the characteristic northwestern sound change of j to y. It is likely a cognate of the Bangani title Jim Raza 'god of the dead'. He is also known as Mara "Killer, Death", a term derived from the Prasun language.

Cognates of Kamkata-vari imro are found in other neighboring languages: Waigali yamrai, Kalash (Urtsun) imbro, Ashkun imra and Prasun yumr'a - all referring to a "creator god".

== Role in religion ==
This deity also acts as the guardian to the gates of hell (located in a subterranean realm), preventing the return to the world of the living - a motif that echoes the role of Yama as the king of the underworld.

== Popular culture ==
In John Updike's 1965 short story "God Speaks" (collected in "Museums and Women") Gish Imra is the name of one of the protagonists, the son of the assassinated leader of a Central Asian state called Nuristan.

In the film adaptation of "The Man Who Would be King", the main God of Kafiristan (Nuristan), is Imbra, a corruption of the name Imra

== See also ==
- Moni
- Great Gish
- Amamikyu
- Yomi
