= Stratagem of Peshawar =

Campaign

- Part of Conflict of Barakzai and Nawab of Amb
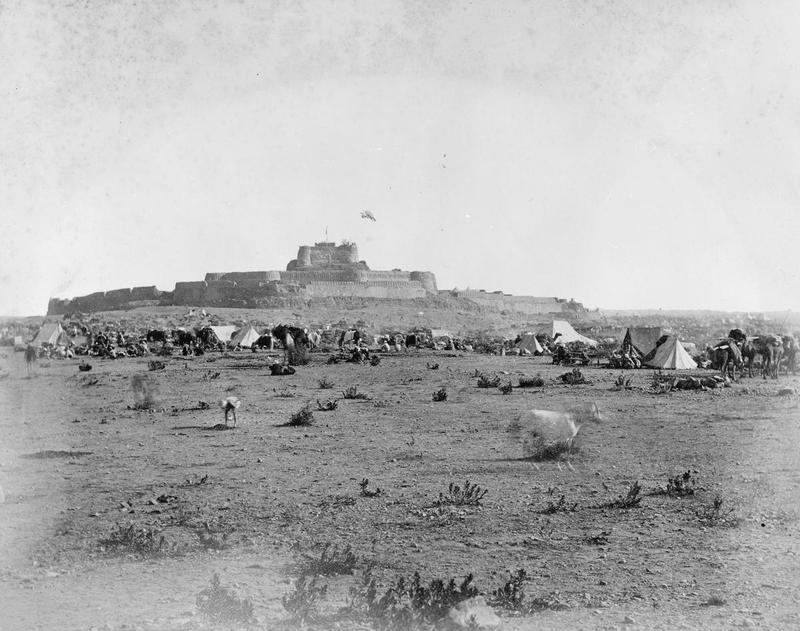
Date	13 October 1818
Location	Peshawar near Jamrud Fort
Result	Durrani (Barakzai) victory

Belligerents
Durrani Empire	Nawab of Amb

Commanders and leaders
Azim Khan Barakzai	Mir Nawab Khan Tanoli †

Strength
40,000–45,000	600–800

Casualties and losses
600-800	Mir Nawab Khan Tanoli was Killed around 800 people killed.

The Stratagem of Peshawar was a campaign of the Durrani empire led by Azim Khan Barakzai against the Nawab of Amb, Mir Nawab Khan Tanoli. Azim Khan who was the half-brother of Dost Muhammad Khan, the King of Afghanistan.

Azim Khan invited Mir Nawab to settle the dispute between Amb and Durrani, but Azim Khan was actually readying for a battle there. When Mir Nawab and his few soldiers reached Jamrud, Azim Khan attacked Mir Nawab's army by encircling their army. The army of Mir Nawab was at a positional disadvantage on the battlefield against the guns and cannon of Azim Khan Barakzai.

As result, Mir Nawab Khan Tanoli was killed, resulting in a major loss to the Kingdom of Amb, which was already greatly embattled against the Sikh Empire. The Nawab of Amb lost their territory and was wiped out.

== Main Reason Behind war ==
The main reason for the war was a tax dispute that arose when Azim Khan's mother was traveling to Kashmir via Tanwal.
