= Kati language =

Kati language may refer to:

- Muyu language, an Ok language of West Papua
- Katë language, spoken in parts of Afghanistan and Pakistan
