= Waygal District =

Waygal Waygul
- District
- Location within Afghanistan
- Coordinates: 35°14′00″N 71°02′00″E
- Country: Afghanistan
- Province: Nuristan

Population (2010)
  - Total: 19,100

Waygal District (Waigali: Vägal, Pashto: وایگل ولسوالۍ, Persian: ولسوالی وایگل) is a district of Nuristan Province in eastern Afghanistan. It has nine major villages in the valley as following by area and population, Waygal, Zanchgal, Nishigram, Ameshdesh, Akun, Kegal, Muldesh, Jamach, and Want. The local Kalasha people speak the Waigali language, a Nuristani language. Pashto and Dari are also widely understood and used as official languages.

== Climate ==
According to the Köppen climate classification system, Waygal has a humid continental climate (Dsb) with warm summers and cold, snowy winters. The annual average temperature in Waygal is 5.0 °C, while the annual precipitation averages 1,096 mm. September is the driest month with 47 mm of precipitation, while March, the wettest month, has an average precipitation of 161 mm.

July is the hottest month of the year with an average temperature of 19.4 °C. The coldest month January has an average temperature of -8.3 °C.

Climate data for Waygalak Hamlet, elevation: 1,991 metres (6,532.2 ft)
Month	Jan	Feb	Mar	Apr	May	Jun	Jul	Aug	Sep	Oct	Nov	Dec	Year
Mean daily maximum °C (°F)	−4.8 (23.4)	−3.3 (26.1)	2.1 (35.8)	8.3 (46.9)	15.6 (60.1)	22.2 (72.0)	25.4 (77.7)	24.0 (75.2)	20.7 (69.3)	14.2 (57.6)	4.2 (39.6)	−2.3 (27.9)	10.5 (51.0)
Daily mean °C (°F)	−8.3 (17.1)	−6.7 (19.9)	−2.5 (27.5)	2.9 (37.2)	6.9 (44.4)	15.1 (59.2)	19.4 (66.9)	18.5 (65.3)	15.1 (59.2)	7.9 (46.2)	−1.4 (29.5)	−6.6 (20.1)	5.0 (41.0)
Mean daily minimum °C (°F)	−11.8 (10.8)	−10.1 (13.8)	−7.0 (19.4)	−2.6 (27.3)	1.8 (35.2)	7.9 (46.2)	13.3 (55.9)	13.0 (55.4)	9.4 (48.9)	1.5 (34.7)	−7.0 (19.4)	−10.8 (12.6)	−0.2 (31.6)
Average precipitation mm (inches)	108 (4.3)	143 (5.6)	161 (6.3)	144 (5.7)	103 (4.1)	60 (2.4)	50 (2.0)	48 (1.9)	47 (1.9)	66 (2.6)	78 (3.1)	88 (3.5)	1,096 (43.4)
Source: Climate-Data.org
