= Peshawar, Afghanistan =

Peshawar پېښور
- Town
- Location
- Coordinates: 35°50′36″N 71°21′45″E
- Country: Afghanistan
- Elevation: 2,643 m (8,671 ft)
- Time zone: UTC+4:30

Peshawar (Pashto: پېښور) is a town in the Barg-i Matal District of Nuristan Province, Afghanistan, at an altitude of 2,634 metres (8,644 feet). It is near the Durand Line border with Khyber Pakhtunkhwa, Pakistan.
