= Nuristanis =

Ethnic group of Afghanistan and Pakistan

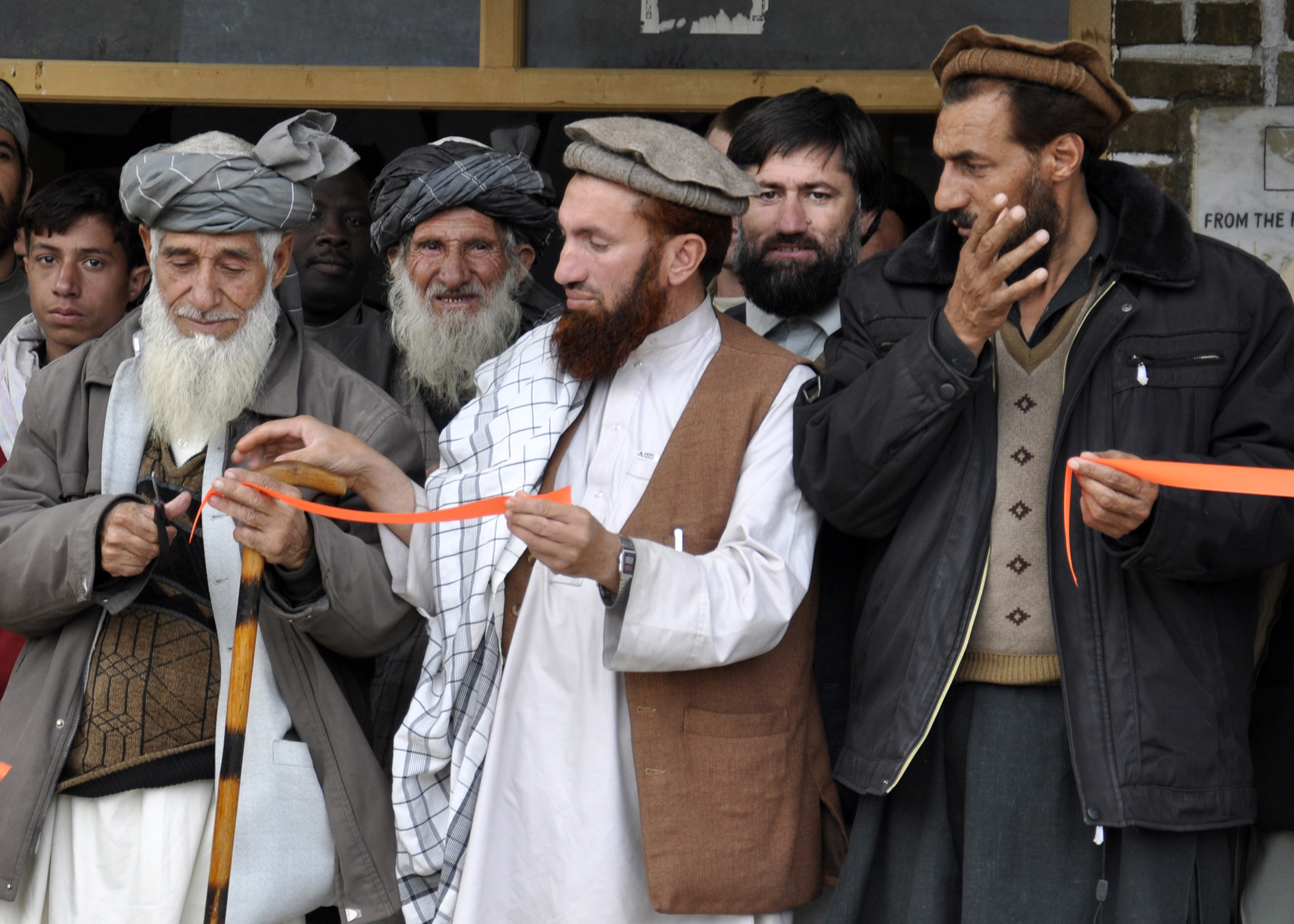
- Nuristani community leaders inaugurated a solar energy project in Nuristan

Total population
- c. 125,000–300,000

Regions with significant populations
- Nuristan, Kunar, Afghanistan; Chitral, Pakistan

Languages
- Nuristani languages, Pashto, serving as the lingua franca and widely understood as a second language

Religion
- Sunni Islam

Related ethnic groups
- Kalash, Kho, Pashayi

The Nuristanis are an Indo-Iranian ethnic group native to the Nuristan Province (formerly Kafiristan) of northeastern Afghanistan and Chitral District of northwestern Pakistan. Their languages comprise the Nuristani branch of Indo-Iranian languages.

In the mid-1890s, after the establishment of the Durand Line when Afghanistan and the British Indian Empire reached an agreement regarding the Indo-Afghan border, the region of Kafiristan became part of the Great Game and for a period of time, Emir Abdur Rahman Khan conducted a military campaign to secure the eastern regions and followed up his conquest by imposition of Islam; the region thenceforth being known as Nuristan, the "Land of Light". Before their conversion, the Nuristanis practised an Indo-Iranian (Vedic- or Hindu-like) religion. (Note: Elements of ancient Indo-Iranian religion: Witzel (2004, p. 2): "an ancient, common substrate (TUITE 2000, cf. BENGTSON 1999, 2001, 2002). These must be separated from what may appear to be Vedic."; "A few key features that highlight the position of Hindukush religion in between the IIr. [Indo-Iranian], BMAC and Vedic religions will be summarized and discussed in some detail, as they by and large even now remain unknown to Vedic specialists, in spite of BUDDRUSS 1960 and the selective summary "d'un domaine mal connu des indianistes" by FUSSMAN (1977: 21-35), who, even with an "esprit hypercritique comme le nôtre" (1977: 27), overstresses (post-Vedic) Indian influences (1977: 69; for a balanced evaluation of the linguistic features, see now DEGENER 2002). However, both Hindukush and Vedic mythology, ritual, and festivals, in spite of many layers of developments and mutual influences, tend to explain each other very effectively; cf. the similar case of Nepal (Witzel 1997c: 520-32)."; Ruhland (2019, p. 107): "Their traditional shamanic religion is probably rooted in Indo-Iranian, pre-Zoroastrian Vedic traditions."; Vinogradov & Zharnikova (2020, p. 182): "... the pagan Kafir pantheon, which has preserved the relics of the most ancient Indo-Iranian mythological concepts."; Richard Strand, Peoples and Languages of Nuristan: "Before their conversion to Islâm the Nuristânis practised a form of ancient Hinduism, infused with accretions developed locally. According to Michael Witzel, this religion preserved many archaic Indo-Iranian elements that were lost further west. They acknowledged a number of human-like deities who lived in the unseen Deity World (Kâmviri d'e lu; cf. Sanskrit deva lok'a-)"; West (2010, p. 357): "The Kalasha are a unique people living in just three valleys near Chitral, Pakistan, the capital of North-West Frontier Province, which borders Afghanistan. Unlike their neighbours in the Hindu Kush Mountains on both the Afghani and Pakistani sides of the border the Kalasha have not converted to Islam. During the mid-20th century a few Kalasha villages in Pakistan were forcibly converted to this dominant religion, but the people fought the conversion and, once official pressure was removed, the vast majority continued to practice their own religion. Their religion is a form of Hinduism that recognises many gods and spirits and has been related to the religion of the Ancient Greeks, who mythology says are the ancestors of the contemporary Kalash [...] However, it is much more likely, given their Indo-Aryan language, that the religion of the Kalasha is much more closely aligned to the Hinduism of their Indian neighbours than to the religion of Alexander the Great and his armies.) Non-Muslim religious practices endure in Nuristan today to some degree as folk customs. In their native rural areas, they are often farmers, herders, and dairymen.

The Nuristan region has been a prominent location for war, which has led to the death of many indigenous Nuristanis. Nuristan has also received an abundance of settlers from the surrounding Afghan regions due to the borderline vacant location.

== History ==
Nuristanis, an Indo-Iranian ethnic group, were formerly classified into Siah-Posh (black-robed) and Safed-Posh (white-robed) or Lal-Posh (red-robed) by external writers. In the 4th century BC, historians accompanying Alexander the Great described people inhabiting present-day Nuristan as being distinct culturally and religiously from other peoples of the region. According to Donald Wilber and other writers, anthropological data suggests that the Kafirs are not the tenth century migrants to Kafiristan but are a remnant of the original population of the area which according to some was Dravidian but according to the others Indo-Aryan.

=== Invasion of Mahmud of Ghazni ===
In 1020–21, Mahmud of Ghazni led a campaign against Kafiristan and the people of the "pleasant valleys of Nur and Qirat" according to Gardizi. The Persian chronicles speak of Qirat and Nur (or Nardin), which H. M. Elliot on authority of al-Biruni identifies with Nur and Kira tributaries of Kabul River. Ferishta wrongly calls these two valleys as "Nardin" and Qirat and confuses this conquest with the one against "Nardin" or Nandana. He also wrongly mentions that it took place after 412 AH. Alexander Cunningham identifies the places conquered as "Bairath" and "Narayanpura".

These people worshipped the lion. While Clifford Edmund Bosworth considers that Mahmud attacked "pagan Afghans", Joseph Theodore Arlinghaus of Duke University does not consider it correct because his source Gardizi simply calls them "pagan (kafiran)" and not "pagan Afghans", as they were not known to be pagan or live on borders of Nuristan in the 11th century. Mohammad Habib however considers that they might have been worshipping Buddha in the form of a lion (Sakya Sinha). Ramesh Chandra Majumdar states that they had a Hindu temple which was destroyed by Mahmud's general. Ram Sharan Sharma meanwhile states that they may have been Buddhist. Cunningham claims based on the reporting of Ferishta that the place was plundered by 'Amir Ali after being taken.

According to Gardizi, while returning from his recent invasion of India, Mahmud had heard about the Kafirs and the chief of Qirat surrendered without any struggle and accepted to convert, with the inhabitants converting as well. Nur however refused to surrender and his general 'Amir Ali led an attack on it, forcing its people to convert. According to Firshta, the rulers of both of them submitted and accepted Islam in 1022. He adds, "On breaking a great temple situated there, the ornamented figure of a lion came out of it, which according to the belief of the Hindus was four thousand years old."

However, no permanent conquest was attempted. Iqbal namah-i-Jahangiri stated that Kafirs still lived in Darrah-i-Nur which Mahmud of Ghazni had claimed to have converted. The Mughal emperor Jahangir had received a delegation of these pure Kafirs in Jalalabad and had honoured them with gifts.

=== Invasions by Timurids ===
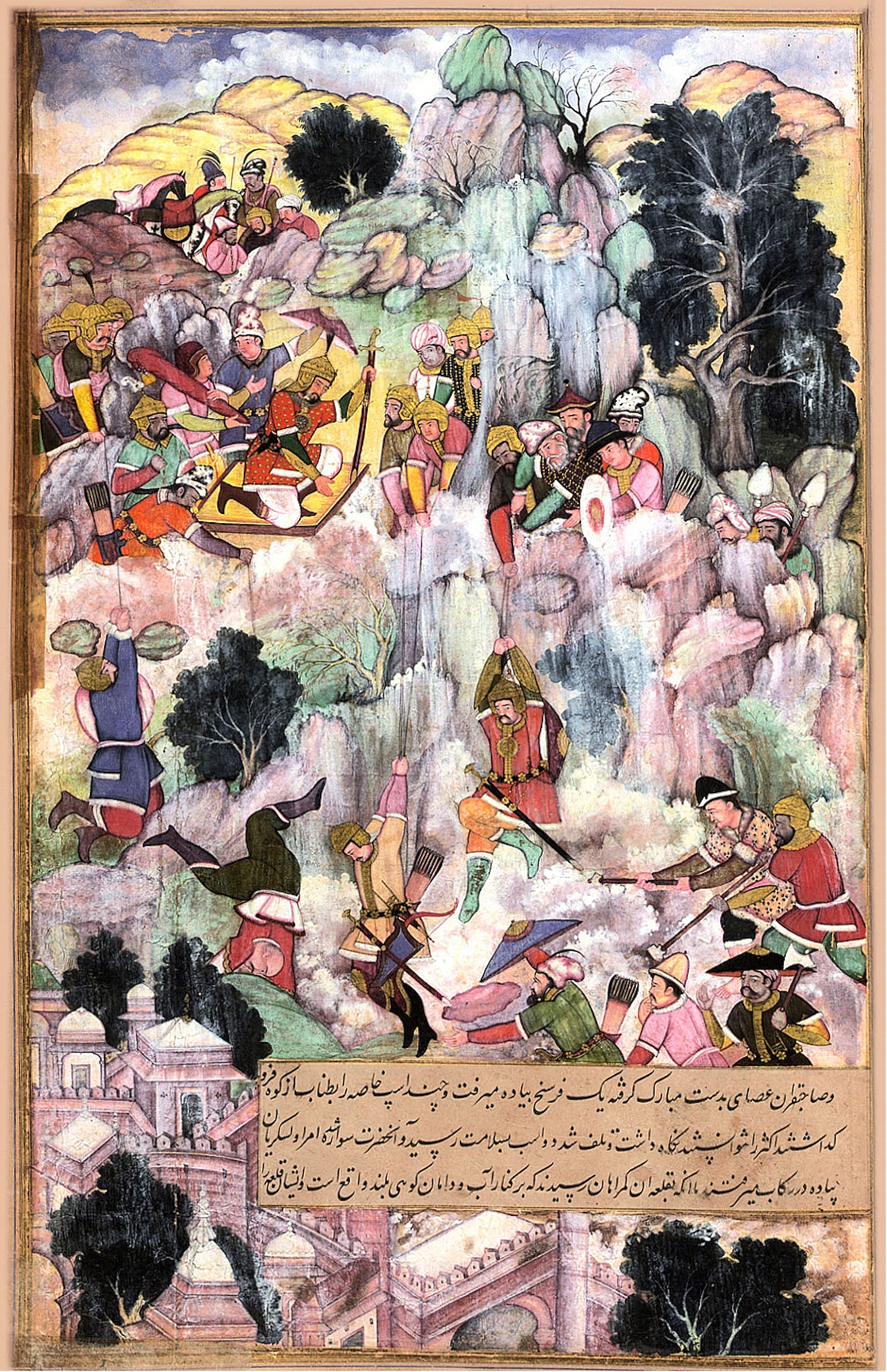
Timur's troops lowered from the mountainside to attack the Siyah-pushan in 1398, Tarikh-i Khandan-i Timuriyya

The campaigns of Timur are recorded by Zafarnama, written by Sharaf ad-Din Ali Yazdi, which is based on another work. On his way to India, Timur attacked the Siyah-Posh in 1398 AD after receiving complaints from the trading city of Andarab about the raids by the Kafirs. He penetrated Kafiristan from Khawak pass and restored an old fortress there. He personally proceeded against the Kator region, which extended from Kabul to Kashmir.

Timur sent a detachment of 10,000 soldiers against the Siyah-Poshs under Burhan Aglan and had the fort of Kator deserted by Kafirs destroyed, while the houses of the city were burnt. The Kafirs took refuge on top of a hill and many were killed in the ensuing clash. Some held out for three days but agreed to convert after Timur offered them the choice between death and Islam. They however soon apostatised and ambushed Muslim soldiers in the night. The Muslims repelled them and a number of the Kafirs were killed, with 150 being taken prisoner and later executed. Timur ordered his men "to kill all the men, to make prisoners of women and children, and to plunder and lay waste all their property." His soldiers carried out the order and he directed them to build a tower of skulls of the dead Kafirs.

Timur had his expedition engraved on a neighbouring hill in the month of Ramadan. His detachment sent against the Siyah-Poshs however met with disaster, with Aglan being routed and forced to flee. A small detachment of 400 men under Muhammad Azad was then sent and defeated the Kafirs, retrieving the horses and armour Aglan lost. Timur later captured a few more places, though nothing more is stated, presumably he left the Siyah-Poshs alone. He proceeded to exterminate the rebellious Afghan tribes and crossed the Indus River in September 1398.

The Timurid Sultan Mahmud Mirza is said to have raided Kafiristan twice by Baburnama, which earned him the title of ghazi.

=== Yarkand Khanate ===
Mirza Muhammad Haidar Dughlat invaded Balor under orders of Sultan Said Khan in 1527-1528 AD, and was accompanied by Said's eldest son Rashid Khan. The expedition was an Islamic frontier raid called ghaza. Dughlat undertook highly devastating plundering raids against the region.

Rashid Khan (r. 1533–1560) undertook further expeditions against Bolor (Kafiristan), which are recorded by Tarikh-i-Kashgar and Bahr al-asar of Mahmud b. Amir Wali. The Kashgari author mentions it briefly, though Wali goes into detail. The first campaign failed with a number of Kashgari captured and enslaved by the people of Bolor. A second invasion was successful and forced them to submit. Tarikh-i-Kashgar states that Bolor was governed by Shah Babur after Abdullah Khan's successful campaign in 1640.

=== Mughals ===
Babur himself came to the region in the winter of 1507–1508 and had an inscription carved commemorating his transit. While fleeing to India to take refuge in the Afghan-Indian borderlands after Shibani Khan attacked Qandahar, which Babur had recently conquered, he marched from Kabul to Lamghan in September 1507. He eventually reached the Adinapur fort in Nangarhar district and commented that his men had to forage for food and raided the rice fields of the Kafirs in the Alishang district.

While writing in his memoirs, Babur noted that when he captured Chigha Sarai in 1514, the "Kafirs of Pech came to their assistance." He mentions some Muslim nīmčas or half-breeds, probably converted Kafirs, who married with the Kafirs and lived at Chigha Sarai, located at confluence of Kunar River and Pech River. In 1520, he mentions sending Haidar Alamdar to the Kafirs, who returned and met him under Bandpakht along with some Kafir chiefs who gifted him some wineskins.

The relationship between the Siahposh and the residents of Panjshir and Andarab remained the same even more than a century after Timur's expedition. Babur records about Panjshir that, "It lies upon the road, and is in the immediate vicinity of Kafiristan. The inroads of the robbers of Kafiristan are made through Panjshir. In consequence of their vicinity of the Kafirs – the inhabitants of this district are happy to pay them a fixed contribution. Since I last invaded Hindustan, and subdued it (in 1527), the Kafirs have descended into Panjshir, and returned after slaying a great number of people and committing extensive damages."

Per Tabakat-i-Akbari, the Mughal emperor Akbar had dispatched his younger brother Mirza Muhammad Hakim, who was a staunch adherent of the missionary-minded Naqshbandi Sufi order, against the Kafirs of Katwar in 1582. Hakim was a semi-independent governor of Kabul. The Sifat-nama-yi Darviš Muhammad Hān-i Ğāzī of Kadi Muhammad Salim who accompanied the expedition mentions its details and gives Hakim the epithet of Darviš Khan Gazi.

Muhammad Darvish's religious crusade fought its way from Lamghan to Alishang, and is stated to have conquered and converted 66 valleys to Islam. After conquering Tajau and Nijrau valleys in Panjshir area, his forces established a fort at Islamabad, located at the confluence of Alishang and Alingar rivers. They continued the raid up to Alishang and made their last effort against the non-Muslims of Alingar, fighting up to Mangu, the modern border between Pashai and Ashkun-speaking areas.

The conquest does not seem to have had a lasting effect, as Henry George Raverty mentions that Kafirs still lived in upper part of Alishang and Tagau. Khulasat al-ansab of Hafiz Rahmat Khan stated that the Afghans and Kafirs of Lamghan were still fighting each other during the time of Jahangir.

In 1839, the Kafirs sent a deputation to Sir William Hay Macnaghten in Jalalabad claiming relationship with the fair skinned British troops who had invaded the country during the First Anglo-Afghan War.

=== Settlement in Chitral ===
At the time of the Afghan conquest of Kafiristan, a small number of Kom and Kati Kafirs fled east to Chitral (in modern Pakistan) where they were allowed to settle by the Mehtar. There they practised their faith for a few more decades, before finally converting to Islam as well. The final known non-converted Kafir was settled in a Chitrali village known as Urtsun. This Kafir's name was Chanlu, and he converted in 1938, several months after being interviewed about the cosmology of the Kati.

In Chitral, the Nuristanis are known either as Bashgalis (as most migrated from a valley of Nuristan called Bashgal in the Chitrali Khowar language), or alternatively as Sheikhan (a generic term for recent converts to Islam). The exact population size of Nuristanis in Chitral is unknown, but members of the community estimate that they number at least 12,000. All of them are speakers of the Kamkata-vari language, also known locally as Sheikhani.

=== 1895–1979: Integration and resistance ===
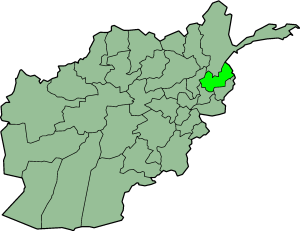
Nuristan, in light green

In 1895–96, Emir Abdur Rahman Khan conquered Kafiristan as part of his campaign to consolidate Afghan territorial control. The region was renamed "Nuristan" ("Land of Light") to reflect the population's forced conversion to Islam. Pre-Islamic shrines, idols, and ritual structures were destroyed, and religious leaders were either executed, marginalized, or co-opted.

The Islamic conversion was largely symbolic at first. Many Nuristanis continued to observe traditional practices in private or repurposed them under new Islamic labels. Former deities were sometimes reframed as Islamic saints, and seasonal rituals persisted with Qur'anic recitations replacing older hymns. This selective adaptation reflects a broader pattern of religious syncretism and cultural negotiation.

While some Nuristanis accepted Islam to avoid persecution, others resisted actively. The rugged terrain and clan-based society enabled certain communities to maintain partial autonomy well into the 20th century. Oral histories recount episodes of defiance, martyrdom, and the clandestine preservation of sacred knowledge.

Under the Afghan monarchy and successive regimes, efforts to assimilate Nuristanis continued through administrative restructuring, military conscription, Islamic schooling, and the symbolic elevation of tribal leaders. Despite this, the region remained politically and economically marginalized. Poor infrastructure, limited access to education and healthcare, and cultural stigmatization contributed to deep-seated resentment toward the central state.

Gender roles also shifted after Islamization. While women had previously participated in communal rituals and managed household economies, their visibility and autonomy declined as Islamic norms enforced stricter gender segregation and curtailed public roles.

By the late 1970s, these historical grievances helped fuel support for emerging anti-government and Islamist movements. Nuristan's terrain and tribal networks made it a stronghold for early mujahideen resistance following the 1978 Saur Revolution and during the Soviet invasion of Afghanistan.

=== Soviet–Afghan War (1979–1989) ===
General Issa Nuristani was second in command following the King during the Soviet invasion of Afghanistan, being the commander of the 1st Central Army Corps. Before his assassination, General Issa called the Nuristani people in a "Jihad" against the Soviet Army and the Afghan Armed Forces. Led by the Kom tribe, the Nuristani were the first citizens of Afghanistan to revolt against Saur Revolution in 1978. They played an important role in the conquering of some provinces, including Kunar, Nangarhar, Badakhshan, and Panjshir. Thereafter, Nuristan remained a scene of some of the bloodiest guerrilla fighting with the Soviet forces from 1979 through 1989. Following the withdrawal of the Soviet troops in 1989, the Mawlawi Ghulam Rabbani was declared as governor of the Kunar Province. The Nuristanis inspired others to fight and contributed to the demise of the Democratic Republic of Afghanistan in 1992.

== Pre-Islamic religion ==
Kareik, the last Kati singing priest (deblole)

Kati sacrificing goat to the God Imra

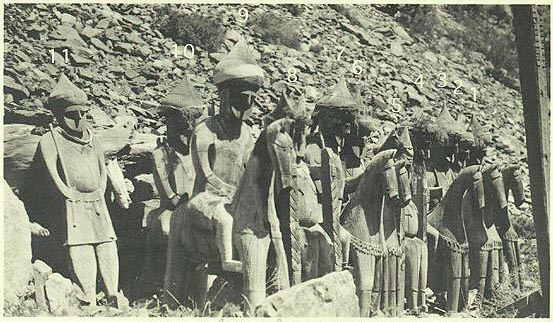
Kati ancestor statues - Brumotul, Bumboret Valley, Chitral; picture by Georg Morgenstierne in 1929

Kati Hymn: Ut'äya de'bulā̃ 'ye! Tu pycüř sun mol O Priestess, (to-) the-dance come! Your on head golden garland is!

The Nuristanis practised what authors consider as a form of animism and ancestor worship (Note: Animism and ancestor worship: Witzel (2004, p. 2): "There is the prominent role of shamans (pshur, wrear, deal N., dehar K., LIEVRE & LOUDE 1990) and related items: the use of flat circular drums, of various types of psychopharmaca (wine, fly agaric, rhubarb, mead, Pashto hum ~ Kalash sámani; cf. also NYBERG 1995), and a general pattern of goat sacrifice (already seen at Mehrgarh, near Quetta, 6500 BCE), with sprinkling of the blood of the victim. There also is a general pattern of belief in mountain fairies, now often called by their Persian name, Peri, but still called Apsaras in the Rājatara ṅgi ṇī (3.465, 468-471 for King Ra ṇāditya's entering and disappearig in a mountain cave into the company of Daitya women)."; Searle (2013, p. lxxvii): "Kafiristan, the 'Land of the unbelievers', is a tiny enclave of pagans, who practice animism and ancestor worship, and remain unconverted to Islam."; Pelton (1997): "The Kalash (which means 'black' because of the black garments they wear) are an animist tribe who live in a region sometimes called Kafiristan."; Ruhland (2019, p. 107): "Their traditional shamanic religion is probably rooted in Indo-Iranian, pre-Zoroastrian Vedic traditions.") with elements of Indo-Iranian (Vedic- or Hindu-like) religion. Noted linguist Richard Strand, an authority on Hindu Kush languages, observed the following about pre-Islamic Nuristani religion:

Before their conversion to Islâm the Nuristânis practiced a form of ancient Hinduism, infused with accretions developed locally.

They acknowledged a number of human-like deities who lived in the unseen Deity World (Kâmviri d'e lu; cf. Sanskrit deva lok'a-).

However, recent research by Jakob Halfmann shows that the pre-Islamic Nuristani religion was heavily influenced by local accretions of Hinduism, evidenced in most theonyms being loanwords from Indo-Aryan.

Mitch Weiss and Kevin Maurer describe the Nuristanis of having traditionally practised a "primitive" form of Hinduism, up until the late nineteenth century, before their conversions to Islam. The names of multiple Nuristani deities resembled those of Iranian and old Vedic sources.

Certain deities were revered only in one community or tribe, but one was universally revered as the creator: the Hindu god Yama Râja called Imr'o in Kâmviri. There is a creator god, appearing under various names, as lord of the nether world and of heaven: Yama Rājan, or Māra ('death' in Nuristani), or Dezau (ḍezáw) whose name is derived from Indo-European *dheiǵh- i.e. "to form" (Kati Nuristani dez "to create", CDIAL 14621); Dezauhe is also called by the Persian term Khodaii.

They believed in a pantheon of deities. Among the most prominent was Imra (or Mara), regarded as the creator and sky deity, possibly connected to the Indo-Aryan god Yama or Indra. Another major figure was Gish or Giwish, the war god and cultural hero, often invoked for victory and clan protection. Among the Bashgul Kafirs, Gish was considered the most widely venerated deity, with shrines dedicated to him in nearly every village. Mandi or Moni, another deity, may have functioned as a trickster or divine messenger. Each god had a distinct cult, sacred sites, and feast days, often tied to seasonal or agricultural cycles.

In addition to the supreme deity named Mara or Imra, the Nuristani worshipped a multitude of lesser gods and goddesses known locally as Wushum or Shomde, Bagisht, Indr, Züzum, Disani, Kshumai or Kime etc.

Additional deities recorded in 19th-century ethnographic accounts include Arom, tutelary god of the Kam Kafirs, associated with treaty sacrifices; Satarám (or Sudaram), connected with weather and rainfall; Dizane, a goddess linked to the wheat harvest and honored at the Giché new year festival; Nirmali, associated with protection during childbirth; and Krumai, tied to the mountain of Tirich Mir. The same sources describe a tiered religious leadership: the utah, a widely respected high priest, with Presungul reported as having one per village; the debilála, responsible for ritual praise-chanting; and the pshur, who became temporarily possessed during ceremonies. Utahs were reportedly bound by certain taboos, including restrictions on visiting cemeteries or entering a house following a death.

Each village and clan had its guardian deity, with shamans advising those seeking help and priests officiating at religious services. The cult centered on the sacrifice of animals.

Their religious life followed a ritual calendar based on seasonal changes and included communal festivals celebrating the summer and winter solstices, planting and harvest times, and the New Year, referred to as gósham in some areas. These festivals involved sacrifices, communal feasting, dancing in masks, wine-drinking, and the recitation of epic poetry, providing opportunities for social and spiritual renewal.

Sacrifices played a central role, often performed before sacred fires. These fires, maintained by priests known as bagisht, were used for purification, oaths, and major ceremonies. The reverence for fire likely reflects ancient Indo-Iranian fire cult traditions.

Religious life centered on shrines called astān, which housed wooden effigies of gods or ancestors. These included horned masks, stylized animals, and human figures carved from wood. Such shrines were adorned and protected from pollution and were often located near sacred trees, springs, or elevated sites.

The religious specialists, mostly male priests from hereditary lines, were responsible for sacrifices, rituals, and interpreting omens. Bards and storytellers also played a crucial role, transmitting epic tales about gods and heroes through oral tradition. While men led public ceremonies, women participated in domestic rites, fertility offerings, and healing practices. There are occasional accounts of female spirit mediums or oracles in localized contexts.

Ancestor worship was another significant component. Clan founders and revered ancestors were honored at special shrines, and feasts were held in their memory. These spirits were believed to influence the living and protect the community.

The area extending from modern Nuristan to Kashmir was known as "Peristan", a vast area containing a host of Nuristani cultures and Indo-European languages that became Islamized over a long period. Earlier, it was surrounded by Buddhist states and societies which temporarily extended literacy and state rule to the region. The journey to the region was perilous according to reports of Chinese pilgrims Fa-hsien and Sung Yun. The decline of Buddhism resulted in the region becoming heavily isolated. The Islamization of the nearby Badakhshan began in the 8th century and Peristan was completely surrounded by Muslim states in the 16th century. The Kalash people of lower Chitral are the last surviving heirs of the area.

The region was called Kafiristan because while the surrounding populations were converted to Islam, the people in this region retained their traditional religion, and were thus known as "Kafirs" to the Muslims. The Arabic word "Kufr" means disbelief and the related word "Kafir" means one who does not believe in Islam. After Emir Abdur Rahman Khan's conquest of Kafiristan in the late 19th century, the native religion was outlawed, temples destroyed or converted, and the population forcibly converted to Islam. Today, the Kafirs are mostly Sunni Muslims, but traces of their old beliefs linger in folklore and cultural practices. The province is now known as Nuristan and the people as Nuristanis. However, among the rural population many old customs and beliefs like occasional production of wine have continued.

== Society and culture ==
=== Pre-1895 Kafir society ===
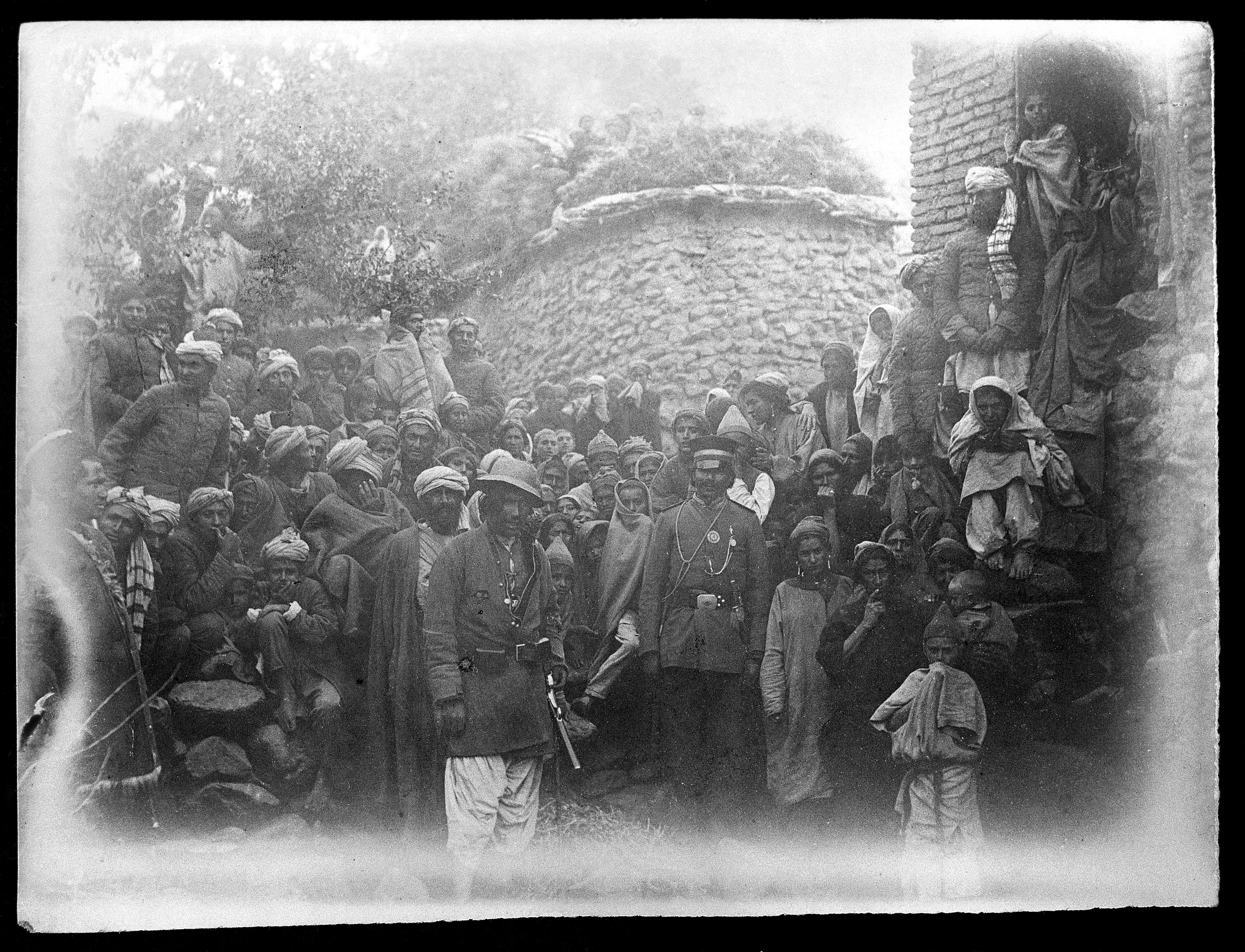
Group of Kafir men, women and children between 1894 and 1896

Prior to 1895, the Kafirs of the Hindu Kush were classified into two groups: the Siah-Posh (black clad) and the Safed-Posh (white clad) Kafirs, also known as the Lal-Posh (red-clad), so-called because of the colour of the robes they wore. But the British investigator George Scott Robertson who visited Kafiristan and studied the Kafirs for about two years (1889–1891) improved upon the old classification by recognising that the Safed-Posh Kafirs were actually members of several separate clans, viz, the Waigulis, Presungulis or Viron, and the Ashkuns. The later three groups of the Kafirs used to be collectively known as Safed-Posh Kafirs.

The term Siah-Posh Kafirs used to designate the dominant group of Hindu Kush Kafirs inhabiting the Bashgal Valley. The Siah-Posh Kafirs have sometimes been confused with Kalash people of the neighbouring Chitral region in Pakistan.

The Siah-Posh tribe was divided into Katirs or Kamtoz, Mumans or Madugals, Kashtoz or Kashtan, Gourdesh or Istrat, and Kams or Kamoze. The Katirs were further divided into the Katirs, who occupied twelve villages of the lower Bashgul (Kam) country, the Kti or Katawar, who lived in two villages in the Kti Valley, the Kulam, and the Ramguli, the most numerous group, living in twenty four villages in the Ramgul Valley, in the westernmost part of Kafiristan on the Afghan frontier.

All Siah-Posh groups of Kafirs were regarded as of common origin. They all had a common dress and customs and spoke closely related dialects of Kati. Nicholas Barrington et al. reported that the Waigulis and Presungulis referred to all Siah-posh Kafirs as Katirs.

While the Kamtoz of the lower Bashgal Valley were the most numerous, the Kam of the upper Bashgal Valley were the most intractable and fierce and dreaded for their military prowess.

Prior to their conversion to Islam in the late 19th century, the Kafir people (now known as Nuristanis) maintained a complex, decentralized tribal society shaped by their mountainous environment and oral traditions. Their highland communities were divided into independent clans, each with its own leaders, ritual specialists, and customary laws.

Kafir society was stratified into several classes, including landowning elites, free commoners, skilled artisans, and dependent or servile groups. Social status was closely tied to one's performance in ritual life, success in warfare, and generosity in feasting. Youth initiation rites for both boys and girls marked social maturity and spiritual engagement, often involving communal dancing, animal sacrifice, and oaths to clan deities.

Their spiritual worldview was polytheistic, centered on a pantheon of gods associated with the sun, fire, rivers, and ancestral spirits. Sacred groves, springs, and mountaintops served as ritual spaces. The bagisht (priest) and shamans held key religious roles, leading seasonal festivals and divination ceremonies to ensure fertility and communal wellbeing. These leaders mediated between the human and divine worlds, performing sacrifices, healing, and protection rites.

Economically, the Kafirs practiced terrace agriculture, cultivating wheat, barley, millet, and pulses on steep mountain slopes. Goat and cattle herding supplemented their diet, and they were particularly noted for producing and consuming wine made from grapes and mulberries — an important feature of feasts and hospitality. Beekeeping and fruit orchards added further variety to their subsistence strategies.

Kafirs were also accomplished ironworkers, producing weapons, farming tools, and ritual items used locally or traded with neighboring valleys. Trade goods included daggers, salt, woolen fabrics, and medicinal herbs. Raiding, while morally sanctioned under certain customs, was a form of redistributive warfare and a source of prestige, often glorified in oral poetry and songs.

Cultural expression flourished through oral literature — epic songs, genealogical recitations, and mythic storytelling — passed down through generations. These narratives served to preserve history, identity, and cosmology.

=== External contacts and cultural resilience ===
Despite their geographic isolation, the Kafir communities maintained extensive interaction with neighboring ethnic groups, including the Kalash of Chitral, Pashtuns, and Indo-Aryan Dardic peoples such as the Pashayi. Historical records and oral traditions suggest frequent exchanges of goods, rituals, and even kinship ties across these boundaries.

Some scholars argue that the region formed part of ancient Gandhara or existed as a contested frontier resisting imperial encroachment. Arab geographers referred to it as "Kafiristan" acknowledging its religious distinctiveness.

The Kafirs spoke several Indo-Iranian languages, such as Kamkata-vari and Ashkun, characterized by rich oral vocabularies and poetic forms. These languages form a distinct subgroup of the Indo-Iranian family and are today endangered. Oral literature included epics celebrating legendary ancestors, hymns to deities, and moral tales transmitted through communal performance.

Cultural resilience was maintained through ritualized community life emphasizing collective feasting, seasonal festivals, and the preservation of sacred spaces. These practices helped sustain a cohesive identity despite the pressures of trade, migration, and military threat.

Religious syncretism and the persistence of Indo-Iranian mythic motifs — such as divine twins, sacred fire, and world mountains — indicate deep historical continuity. Ethnographers have emphasized parallels between the Nuristanis and the Kalash people of Pakistan, both of whom retain distinct non-Islamic cultural elements and cosmologies.

During the colonial period, European writers often romanticized the Kafirs as "lost Aryans" or descendants of Alexander the Great's army. While these narratives have been discredited by modern scholarship, they contributed to a lasting mystique around the region.

== Genetics ==
In a 2012 research on Y-chromosomes of five Nuristani samples, three were found to belong to the Haplogroup R1a, and one each in R2a and J2a.

== Tribes ==
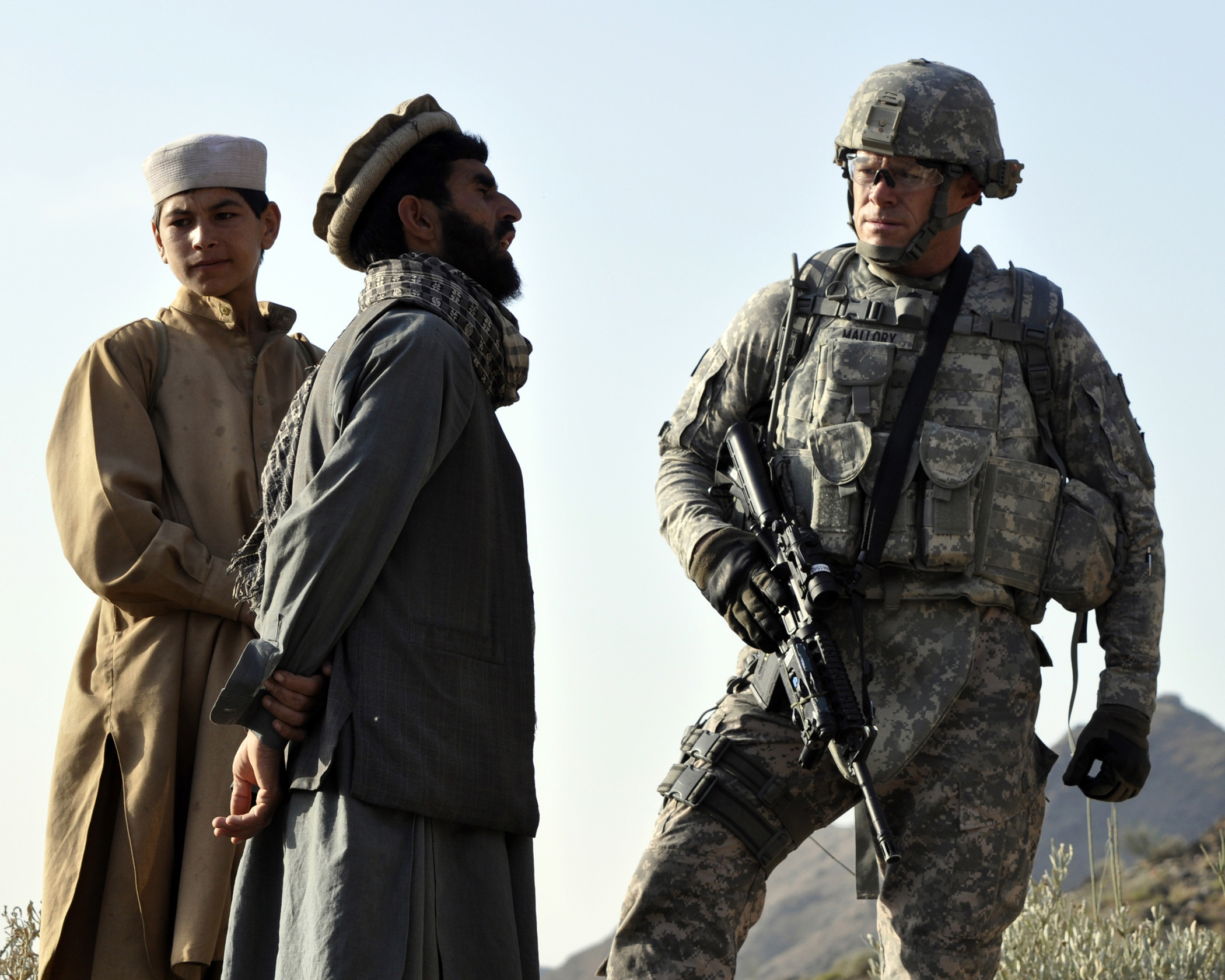
Kautiak villagers in Nuristan province with U.S. Navy commander (right)

Most Nuristanis are from the Kata family and Janaderi branch. However, there are other Nuristani tribes as well, some of the Kata of Janaderi people live in Ozhor (now Karimabad), Gobor, Buburat, Ayun, Broze and Mastuj. There is a peak associated with this tribe located in Karimabad (Juwara) called kata bont (Kata is the name of the tribe; bont meaning "stone" in the Chitrali language).

The Nuristani do not have a formal tribal structure as the Pashtuns do, however they do designate themselves by the names of the local regions they are from.

In total, there are 35 such designations: five from the north–south valleys and 30 from the east–west valley.

Some of these tribes include:

- Askunu
- Dungulio
- Gramsana
- Jench
- Kata
- Kom
- Kshto
- Mumo
- Sanu

== See also ==
- Kho people
- Dardic people
- Burusho people
- Dogan (deity)
