= Parun District =

Parun District Dari: ولسوالی پارون Pashto: پارون ولسوالۍ
- Location in Afghanistan
- Coordinates: 35°24′00″N 70°48′00″E
- Country: Afghanistan
- Province: Nuristan
- Capital: Parun

Government
  - Type: District

Population (2025)
  - Total: 11,563
- Time zone: UTC+04:30 (Afghanistan Time)

Parun District (Dari: ولسوالی پارون; Pashto: پارون ولسوالۍ; Prasun: Vâsi) is one of the districts of Nuristan Province in eastern Afghanistan. The district center is Parun, which has an estimated population of 11,563 people..

== See also ==
- Districts of Afghanistan
