= Nuristan Province =

Province of Afghanistan

Nuristan نورستان
- Province
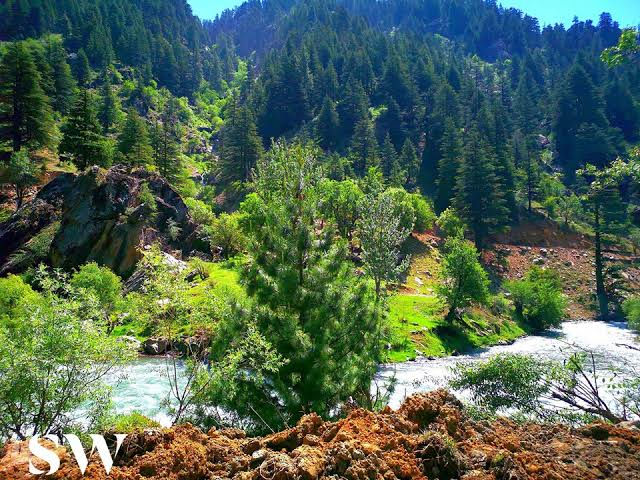
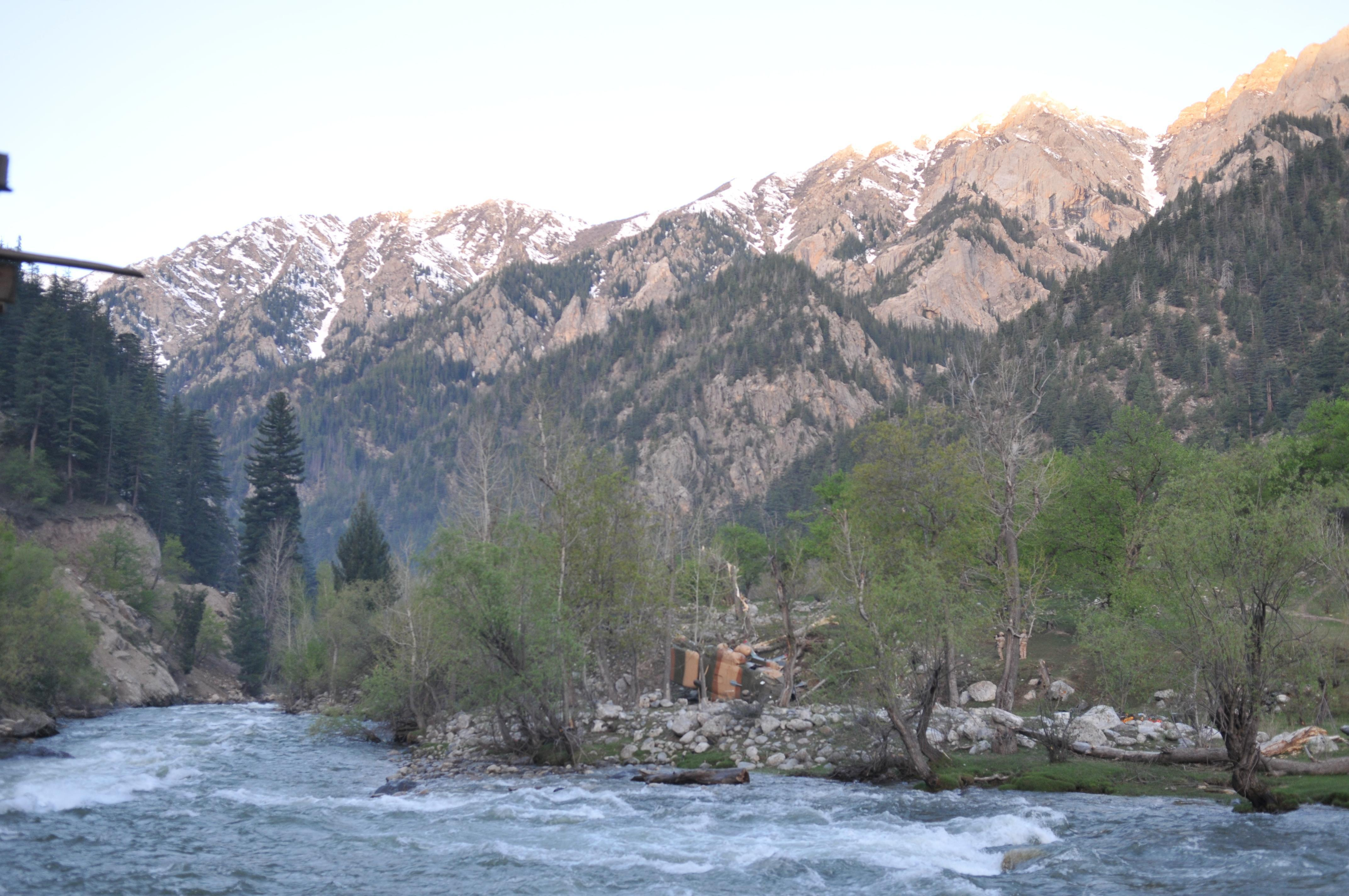
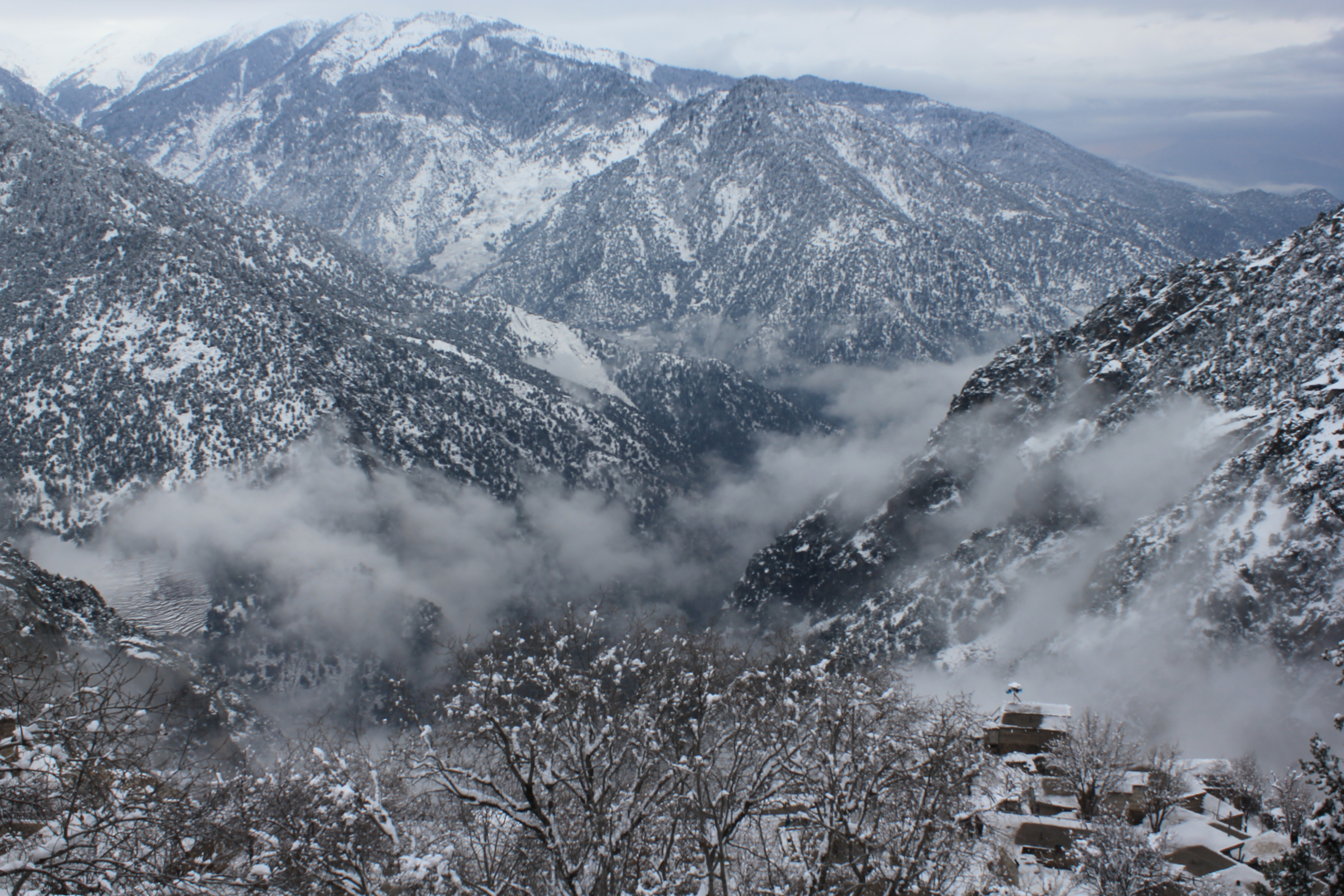
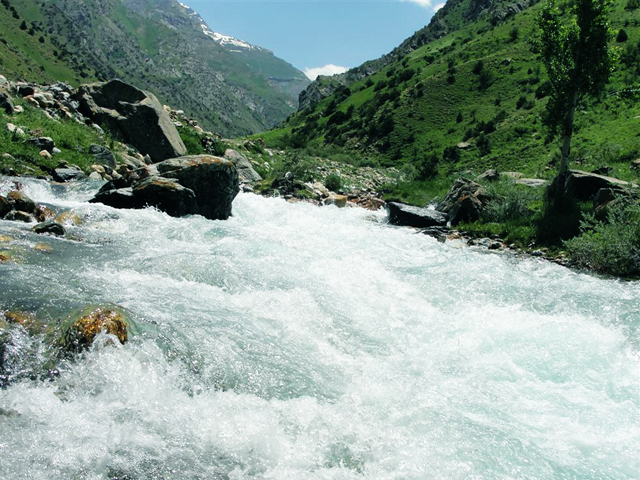
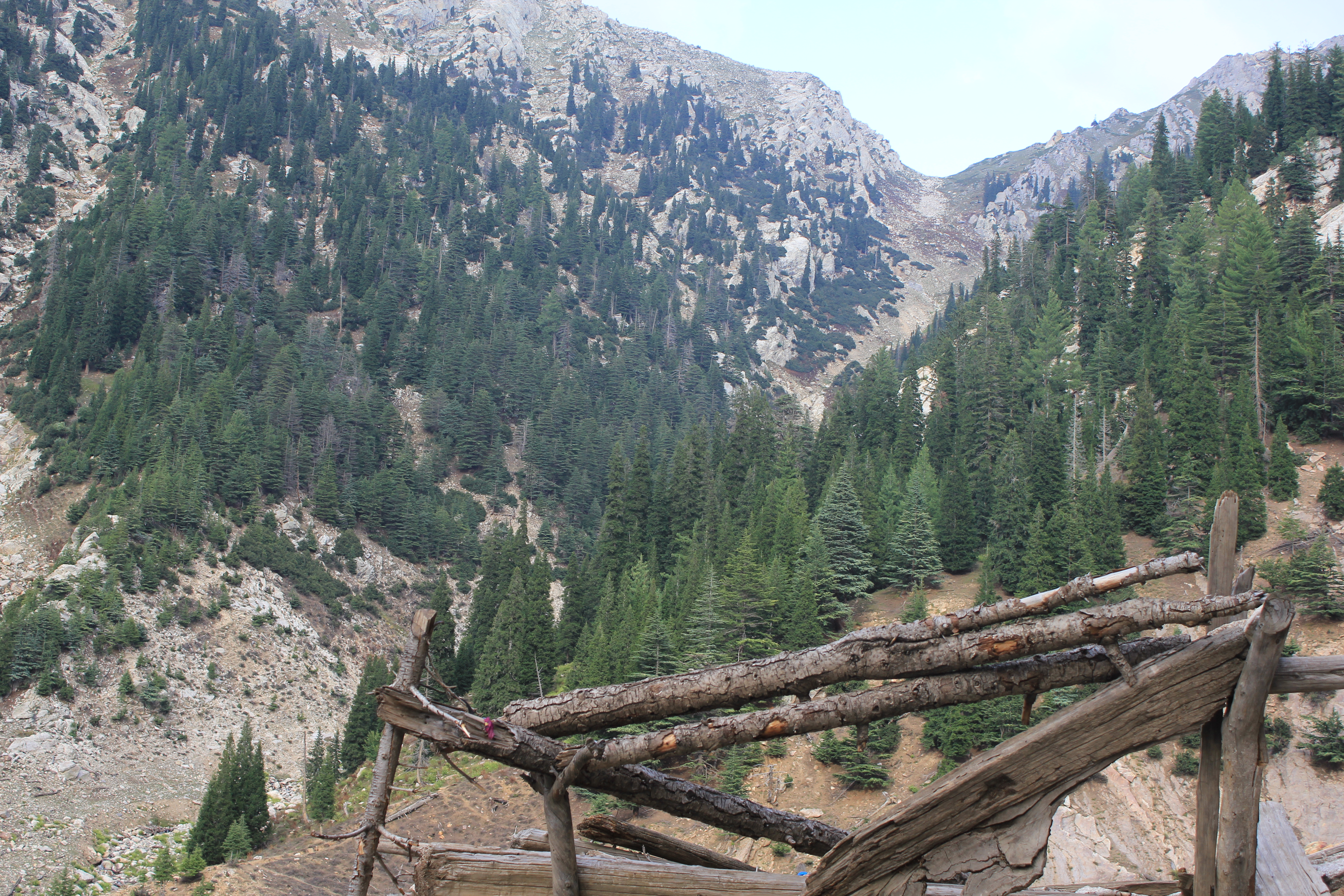
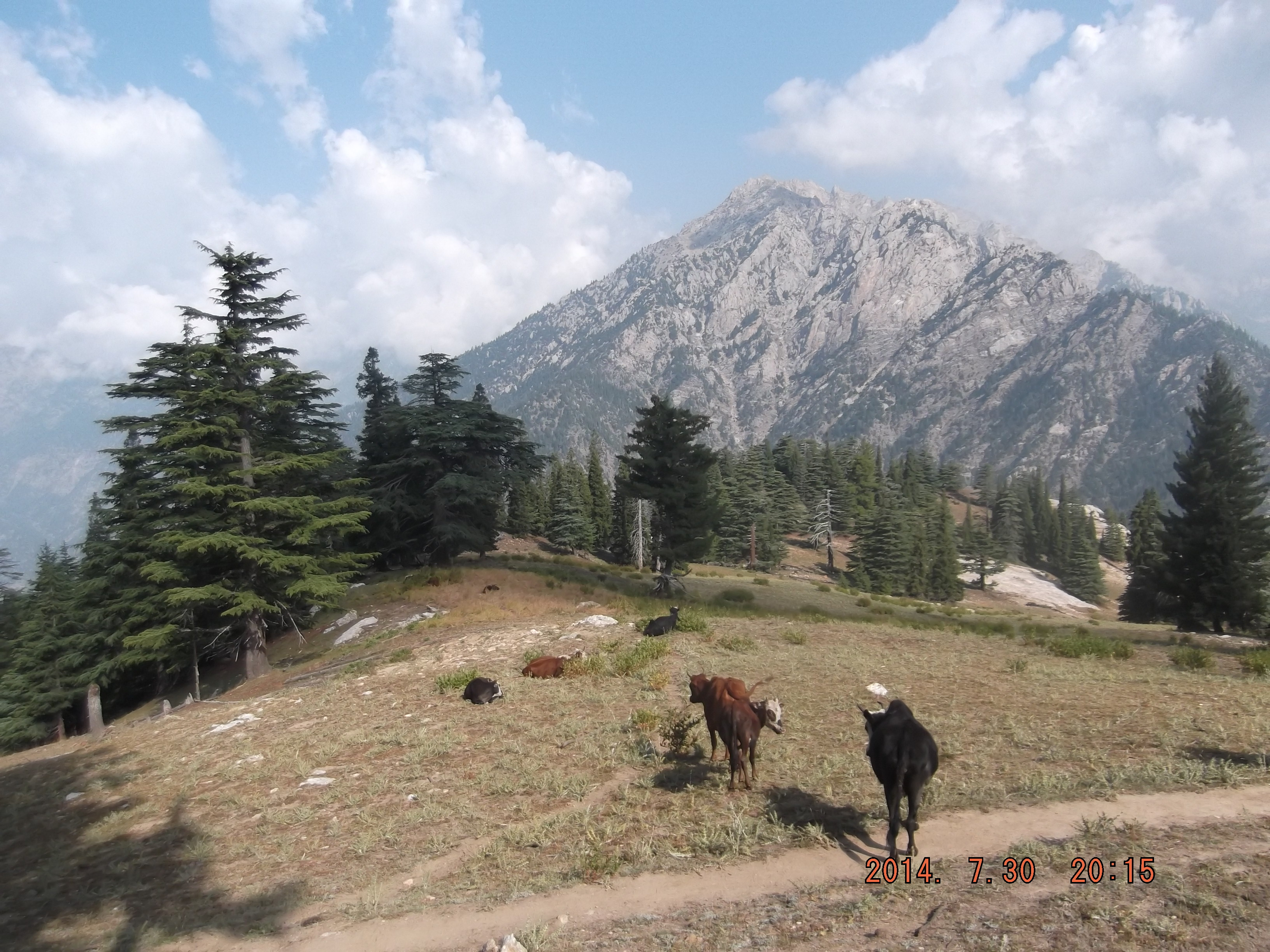
- Nuristan Province

- Map of Afghanistan with Nuristan highlighted
- Coordinates: 35.25°N 70.75°E
- Country: Afghanistan
- Provincial center: Parun

Government
  - Governor: Hafiz Muhammad Aagha
  - Deputy Governor: Sheikh Ismatullah

Area
  - Total: 9,225.0 km^{2} (3,561.8 sq mi)

Population (2021)
  - Total: 166,676
  - Density: 18.068/km^{2} (46.796/sq mi)
- Time zone: UTC+4:30 (Afghanistan Time)
- Postal Code: 29XX
- ISO 3166 code: AF-NUR
- Main languages: Nuristani languages Pashto

Nuristan (Pashto; (Note: Pashto pronunciation: [nu.ɾis.t̪ɑn]) Dari: (Note: Dari pronunciation: [nuː.ɾɪs.t̪ʰɑ́ːn])) نورستان, lit. 'Land of Light'), also spelled as Nurestan, Nooristan or Nuriston (Katë: (Note: Kati pronunciation: [nuː.ɾɪs.t̪ʰɔːn]) نورستان), and historically known as Kafiristan (Pashto, (Note: Pashto pronunciation: [kɑ.pi.ɾis.t̪ɑn, kɑ.fi.ɾis.t̪ɑn]) Dari: (Note: Dari pronunciation: [kɑː.fɪ.ɾɪs.t̪ʰɑ́ːn])) کافرستان lit. 'Land of Infidels') until 1896, is one of the 34 provinces of Afghanistan, located in the eastern part of the country. It is divided into seven districts and is Afghanistan's least populous province, with a population of around 167,000. Parun serves as the provincial capital. Nuristan is bordered on the south by Laghman and Kunar provinces, on the north by Badakhshan Province, on the west by Panjshir Province, and on the east by Chitral District of Pakistan.

The local Nuristani people predominantly inhabit the province; their Nuristani languages form a third branch of Indo-Iranian languages alongside Iranian and Indo-Aryan. Their origin and ethnogenesis has been long a subject of scholarly dispute with a range of theories being presented. Until the last decade of 19th century, the region, then called Kafiristan ("Land of the Infidels"), was the only non-Muslim enclave in Central Asia surrounded by Muslim countries, with Nuristani people following their ancient beliefs and religion. After British recognised the territory as a part of Emirate of Afghanistan following the signing of 1893 Durand Line Agreement, the region was conquered by Afghanistan in 1895, and the inhabitants were forcibly converted from an animist religion with elements from Indo-Iranian (Vedic- or Hindu-like) religion infused with local variations, (Note: Pre-Islamic religion: Ansary (2014): "Kafiristan, "Land of the Infidels," because the people there practiced an animist religion involving elaborate graves decorated with images carved of wood."; Ruhland (2019, p. 107): "Their traditional shamanic religion is probably rooted in Indo-Iranian, pre-Zoroastrian Vedic traditions."; Witzel (2004, p. 2): "an ancient, common substrate (TUITE 2000, cf. BENGTSON 1999, 2001, 2002). These must be separated from what may appear to be Vedic."; "A few key features that highlight the position of Hindukush religion in between the IIr. [Indo-Iranian], BMAC and Vedic religions will be summarized and discussed in some detail, as they by and large even now remain unknown to Vedic specialists, in spite of BUDDRUSS 1960 and the selective summary "d'un domaine mal connu des indianistes" by FUSSMAN (1977: 21-35), who, even with an "esprit hypercritique comme le nôtre" (1977: 27), overstresses (post-Vedic) Indian influences (1977: 69; for a balanced evaluation of the linguistic features, see now DEGENER 2002). However, both Hindukush and Vedic mythology, ritual, and festivals, in spite of many layers of developments and mutual influences, tend to explain each other very effectively; cf. the similar case of Nepal (Witzel 1997c: 520-32)."; Vinogradov & Zharnikova (2020, p. 182): "... the pagan Kafir pantheon, which has preserved the relics of the most ancient Indo-Iranian mythological concepts."; Minahan (2014, p. 205): "Living in the high mountain valleys, the Nuristani retained their ancient culture and their religion, a form of ancient Hinduism with many customs and rituals developed locally. Certain deities were revered only by one tribe or community, but one deity was universally worshipped by all Nuristani as the Creator, the Hindu god Yama Raja, called imr'o or imra by the Nuristani tribes."; Barrington, Kendrick & Schlagintweit (2006, p. 111): "Prominent sites include Hadda, near Jalalabad, but Buddhism never seems to have penetrated the remote valleys of Nuristan, where the people continued to practise an early form of polytheistic Hinduism.") to Islam, and thence the region has become known as Nuristan ("Land of Light").

The primary occupations of inhabitants are agriculture, animal husbandry, and day labor. Located on the southern slopes of the Hindu Kush mountains in the northeastern part of the country, Nuristan spans the basins of the Alingar, Pech, Landai Sin, and Kunar rivers. Most of Nuristan is covered by mountainous forests and it has a rich biodiversity with a domestically unique monsoon climate by air coming from the Indian Ocean. As of 2020, the entirety of Nuristan is now a protected national park.

== History ==
=== Early history ===
There have been varying theories about the origins of Nuristani people. George Scott Robertson considered them to be part of the old Indian population of Eastern Afghanistan and stated they fled to the mountains after the Muslim invasion in the 10th century. He added they probably found other races there whom they killed off and enslaved or amalgamated with them. Oral traditions of some of the Nuristanis place their original abode to be at the confluence of Kabul River and Kunar River a millennium ago. These traditions state they were driven off from Kandahar to Kabul to Kapisa to Kama with the Muslim invasion. They identify themselves as late arrivals in Nuristan, being driven by Mahmud of Ghazni who after establishing his empire forced the unsubmissive population to flee. They have also been linked to various ancient groups of people and the Turk Shahi kings. The region was located in an area surrounded by Buddhist states which later declined.

The surrounding area fell to Alexander the Great in 330 BC. Later it was conquered by Chandragupta Maurya. The Mauryas introduced Buddhism to the region, and were attempting to expand their empire to Central Asia until they faced local Greco-Bactrian forces. Seleucus is reported to have reached a peace treaty with Chandragupta by giving control of the territory south of the Hindu Kush to the Mauryas upon intermarriage and 500 elephants.

Before their conversion to Islam, the Nuristanis practiced an animist religion with elements from Indo-Iranian (Vedic- or Hindu-like) religion infused with locally developed accretions. The high god of the pre-Islamic Nuristani religion was the god Imra, derived from the Hindu god Yama, and was also called Mara. Another god was Indr, derived from Indra. He was seen as the brother of the god Gisht and father of Pano and the goddess Dishani. There were also many other minor gods worshiped in the region.

The area extending from modern Nuristan to Kashmir was part of a wider cultural area called "Kafiristan" in contemporary Islamic sources, containing a host of "Kafir" cultures and Indo-European languages that became Islamized over a long period. In the academic literature, the term "Peristan" has been applied to this region. The Islamization of the nearby Badakhshan began in the 8th century and Peristan was surrounded by Muslim states in the 16th century with the Islamization of Baltistan. The Buddhist states temporarily brought literacy and state rule into the region. The decline of Buddhism resulted in it becoming heavily isolated.

Nuristanis were called "kafirs" due to their enduring paganism while other regions around them became Muslim. However, the influence from district names in Kafiristan of Katwar or Kator and the ethnic name Kati has also been suggested. The name Kator was used by Lagaturman, last king of the Turk Shahi. Apparently due to its usage by the last Turk-Shahi ruler, it was adopted as a title by the ruler of the north-west region of the Indian subcontinent, comprising Chitral and Kafiristan. The title "Shah Kator" was assumed by Chitral's ruler Mohtaram Shah who assumed it upon being impressed by the majesty of the erstwhile pagan rulers of Chitral. The theory of Kators being related to Turki Shahis is based on the information of Jami- ut-Tawarikh and Tarikh-i-Binakiti. The region was also named after its ruling elite. The royal usage may be the origin behind the name of Kator.

In the 19th century, the Emirate of Afghanistan incorporated Nuristan into its territory via military conquest; this occurred around the same time as the beginning of European influence in Afghanistan. The region was invaded by forces of Afghan Amir Abdur Rahman Khan in 1896 and most of the people were converted either by force or did so to avoid the jizya: The region was renamed Nuristan, meaning Land of the enlightened, a reflection of the "enlightening" of the pagan Nuristani by the "light-giving" of Islam.

During this period, one of the most well known Afghan generals from this period, Abdul Wakil Khan, was born in Nuristan. He fought against the insurgent forces of Habibullāh Kalakāni and was buried on the same plateau where Afghan king Amanullah Khan is buried.

=== Recent history ===
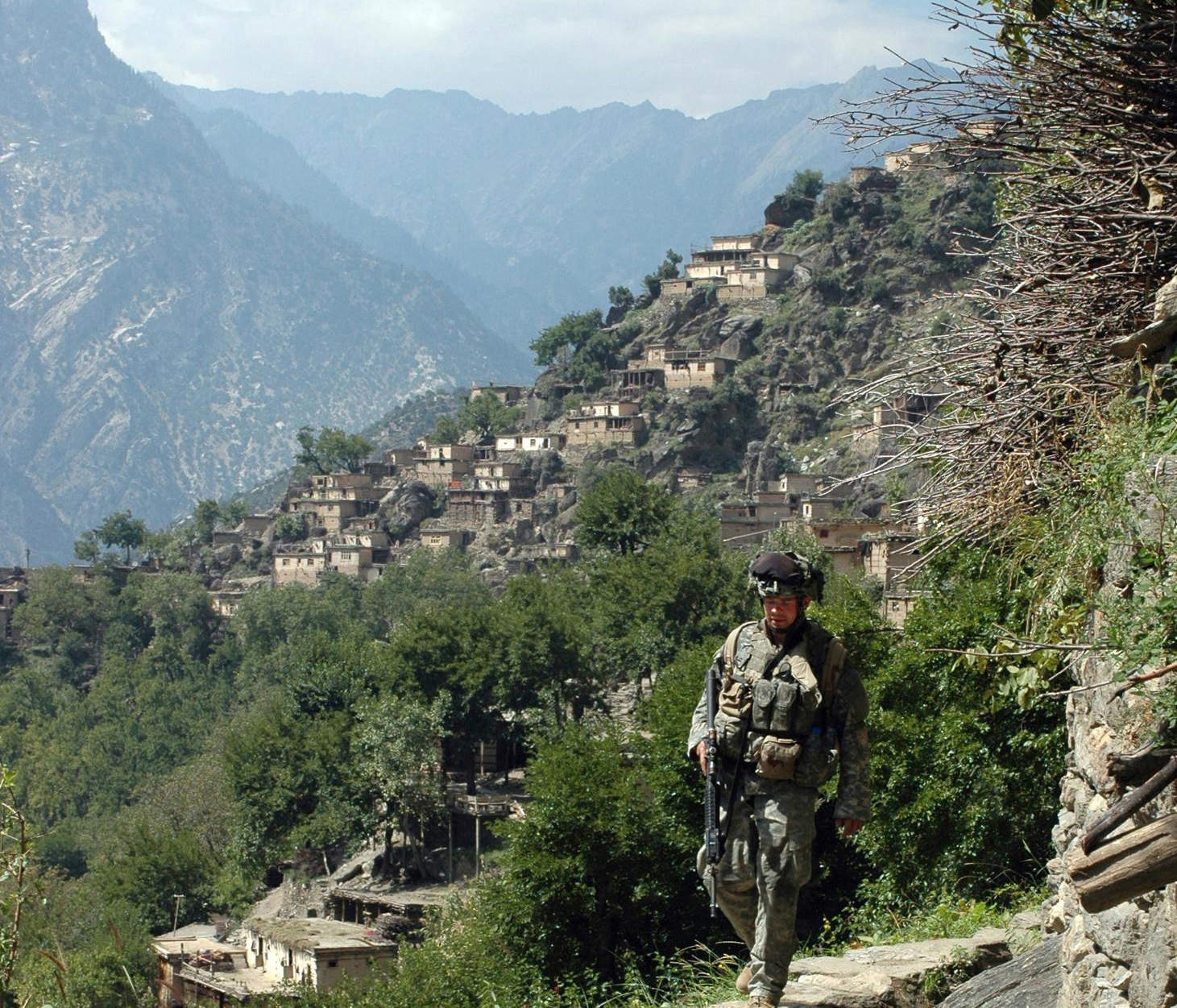
A U.S. soldier moving along a path overlooking the mountainside village of Aranas while on patrol in 2006

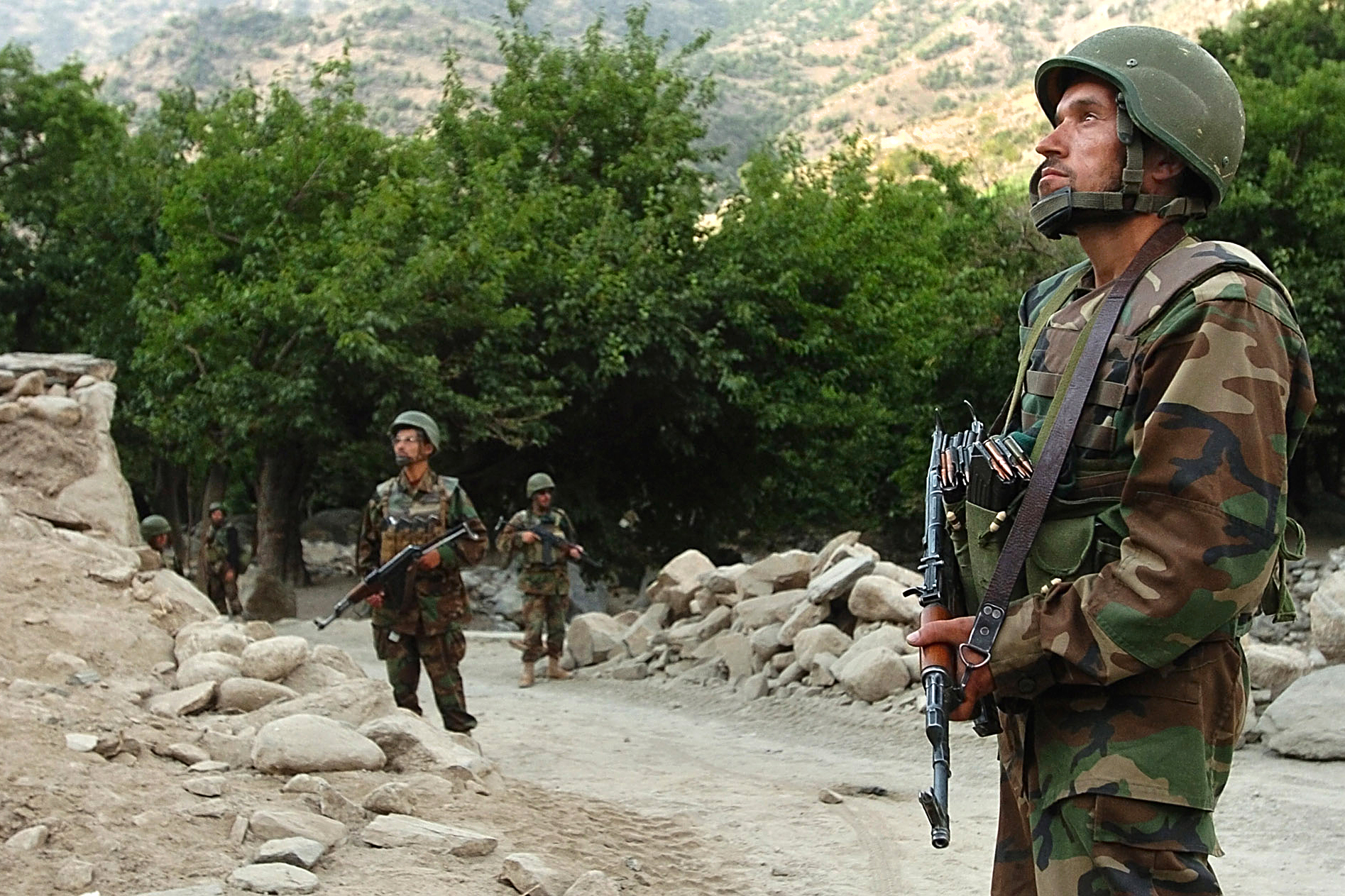
Members of the Afghan National Army (ANA) during a U.S.-led patrol in Wadawu valley during Operation Silver Creek in August 2009

Nuristan is one of the poorest and most remote provinces of Afghanistan. Since the independence of Pakistan in 1947, Afghan politicians, particularly Mohammed Daoud Khan, have been focused on invading Khyber Pakhtunkhwa and the Federally Administered Tribal Areas of Pakistan. This has led to terrorism on both sides of the border as the scene of some of the heaviest guerrilla fighting during the 1980s Soviet–Afghan War. The province was influenced by Mawlawi Afzal's Islamic Revolutionary State of Afghanistan, which was supported by Pakistan and Saudi Arabia. It dissolved under the Islamic Emirate of Afghanistan (Taliban rule) in the late 1990s.

Prior to the takeover of the Taliban in 2021, few NGOs operated in Nuristan because of the insurgency and a lack of safe roads. Some road construction projects were launched linking Nangarej to Mandol and Chapa Dara to Titan Dara. The Afghan government also worked on a direct road route to Laghman Province, in order to reduce dependence on the road through restive Kunar Province to the rest of Afghanistan. Other road projects were started aimed at improving the primitive road from Kamdesh to Barg-i Matal, and from Nangalam in Kunar Province to the provincial center at Parun.

In April 2008 members of the 3rd Special Forces Group led Afghan soldiers from the Commando Brigade into the Shok valley in an unsuccessful attempt to capture warlord Gulbuddin Hekmatyar. In July 2008, approximately 200 Taliban guerrillas attacked a NATO position just south of Nuristan, near the village of Wanat in the Waygal District, killing 9 U.S. soldiers.

In the following year, in early October, more than 350 insurgents backed by members of the Hezb-e Islami Gulbuddin and other militia groups fought U.S.-led Afghan security forces in the Battle of Kamdesh at Camp Keating in Nuristan. The base was nearly overrun; more than 100 Taliban fighters, eight U.S. soldiers, and seven members of the Afghan security forces were killed during the fighting. Four days after the battle, in early October 2009, U.S. forces withdrew from their four main bases in Nuristan, as part of a plan by General Stanley McChrystal to pull troops out of small outposts and relocate them closer to major towns. A map from the Afghan Ministry of the Interior produced in 2009 showed the western region of Nuristan to be under "enemy control". There have been numerous conflicts between militants and U.S.-led Afghan security forces. The U.S. has pulled out from some areas in the past, but never from all four main bases. A month after the U.S. pullout the Taliban was governing openly in Nuristan. According to The Economist, Nuristan is "a place so tough that NATO abandoned it in 2012 after failing to subdue it." In 2021, the Taliban gained control of the province during the 2021 Taliban offensive.

Since Nuristan is a highly ethnically homogeneous province, there are few incidents of inter-ethnic violence. However, there are instances of disputes among inhabitants, some of which continue for decades. Nuristan has suffered from its inaccessibility and lack of infrastructure. The government presence is under-developed, even compared to neighboring provinces. Nuristan's formal educational sector is weak, with few professional teachers. Due to its proximity to Pakistan, many of the inhabitants are actively involved in trade and commerce across the border.

== Administrative divisions ==
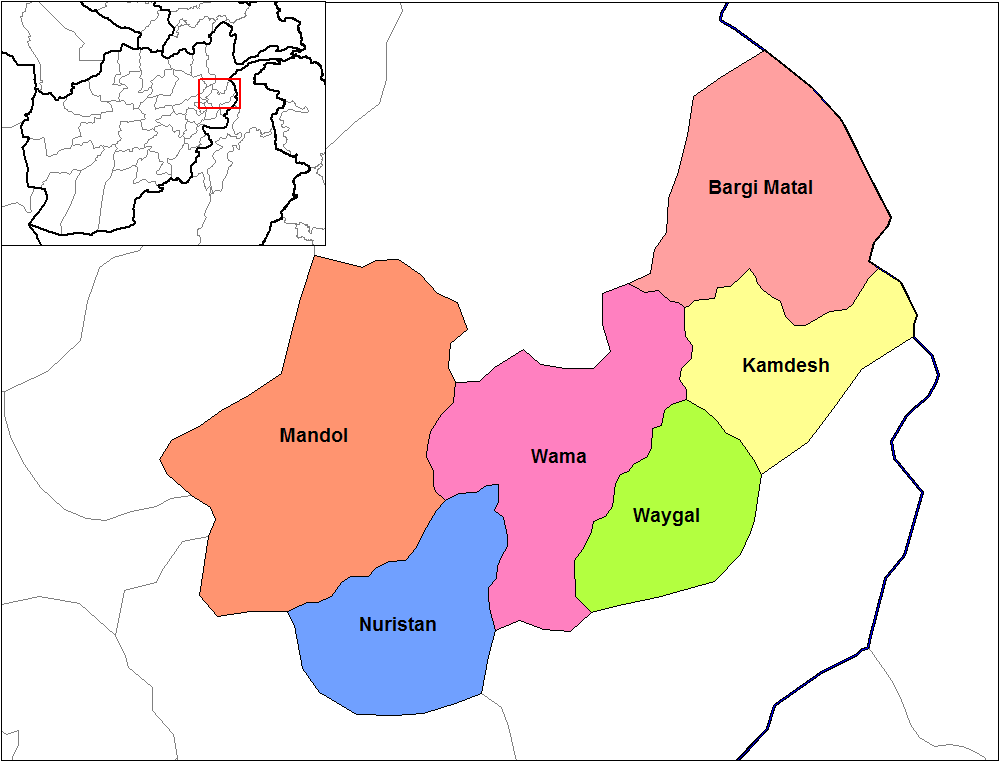
Map of the districts of Nuristan as of January 2004, prior to the redrawing of provincial and district boundaries later that year

Districts of Nuristan Province
District	Center	Population	Area	Pop. density	Notes
Barg-i Matal		17,537	1,731	10	100% Nuristani.
Du Ab		8,902	652	14	99% Nuristani, 1% Gujar. Established in 2004, formerly part of Nuristan District and Mandol District
Kamdesh	Kamdesh	28,564	1,452	20	100% Nuristani.
Mandol		22,320	1,996	11	99% Nuristani, 1% Gujar and Tajik. Lost territory to Du Ab District in 2004
Nurgram		36,536	943	39	100% Nuristani. Established in 2004, formerly part of Nuristan District and Wama District
Parun	Parun	15,279	1,509	10	100% Nuristani. Established in 2004, formerly part of Wama District
Wama		12,489	389	32	100% Nuristani. Lost territory to Parun District and Nurgram District in 2004
Waygal		22,187	907	24	100% Nuristani.
Nuristan		163,814	9,267	18	99.9% Nuristani, 0.1% Gujars, <0.1% Tajiks. (Note: Note: "Predominantely" or "dominated" is interpreted as 99%, "majority" as 70%, "mixed" as 1/(number of ethnicities), "minority" as 30% and "few" or "some" as 1%.)

== Demographics ==
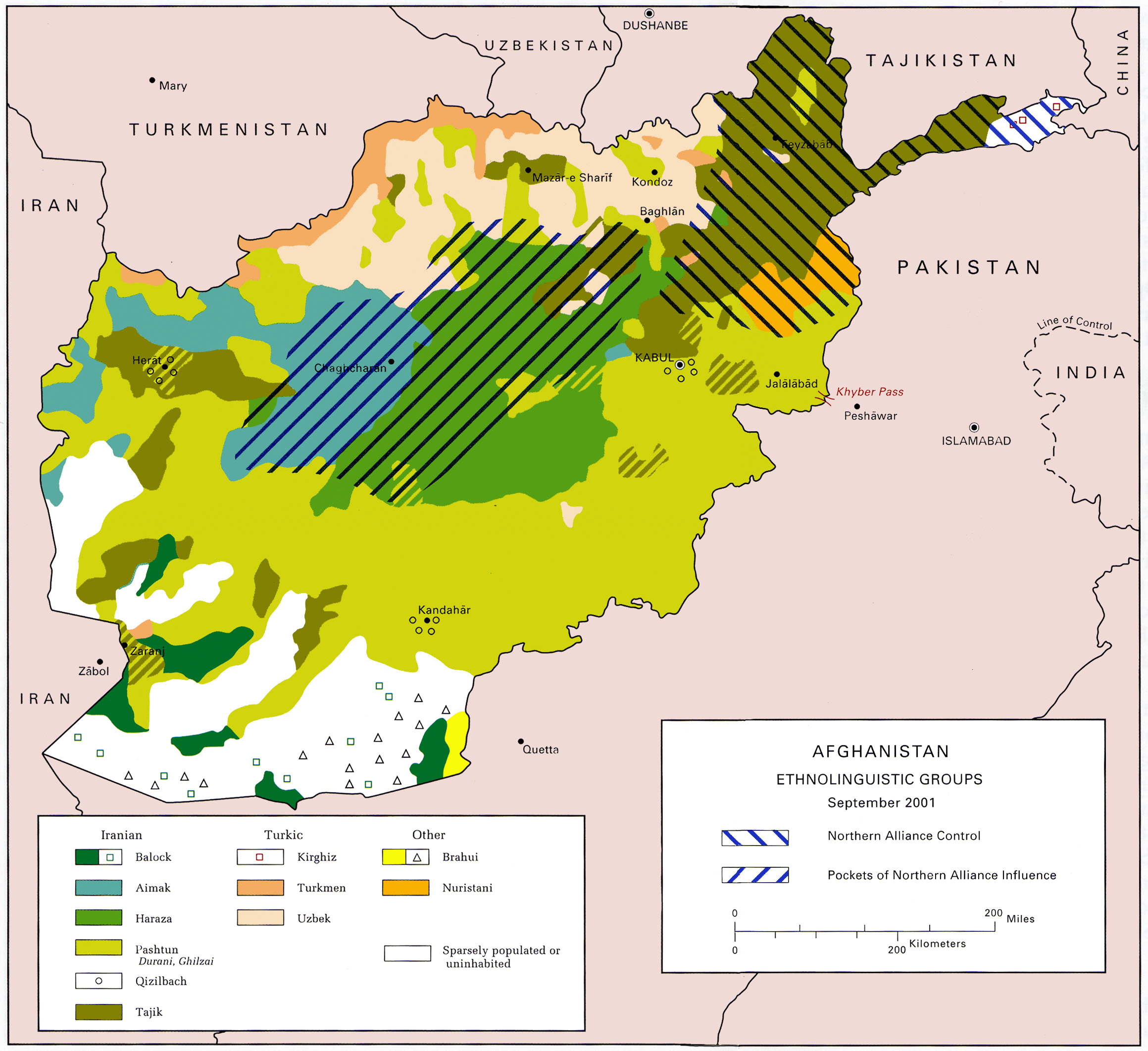
Ethnolinguistic groups in Afghanistan

=== Population ===
As of 2021, the total population of the province is about 166,676.

=== Ethnicity, languages and religion ===
Nuristan is one of the most ethnically homogeneous provinces in Afghanistan, with Nuristanis comprising the overwhelming majority of the population, consistently estimated at over 90 percent across multiple sources. The Nuristanis are not a single ethnic group but rather a collective of distinct sub-groups, the principal ones include the Kata, Kalasha (or Waigali), Ashkuni (or Wamayi), Kom and Prasun tribes, of which the Kata is the largest. Small communities of Gujars, a semi-nomadic pastoralist group, as well as Tajiks and Pashtuns are also present, though each constitutes less than one percent of the permanent population.

The classification of the Pashayi is a matter of some inconsistency. Several sources treat Pashayi as one of the constituent sub-groups collectively termed "Nuristani", while others identify them as a linguistically and ethnically distinct population. This ambiguity directly affects reported ethnic and linguistic figures, since when Pashayi is counted as a Nuristani sub-group, Nuristanis account for 99 percent of the population, but when treated separately, Pashayi speakers represent approximately 15 percent of the province's linguistic composition, making Pashayi the second most widely spoken language after the proper Nuristani languages (spoken by roughly 78 percent of the population and in 84 percent of villages).

In terms of religion, Nuristan's population is almost entirely Sunni Muslim. Historically known as Kafiristan ("land of the infidels") due to the pre-Islamic animist and Hindu-influenced practices of its inhabitants, the region was forcibly converted to Islam by Emir Abdur Rahman Khan beginning in 1895. Despite the relative recency of this conversion, the Nuristani society has developed a notably devout Islamic identity, though some sources mention residual animist traditions in remote communities.

Estimated ethnolinguistic and -religious composition
Ethnicity	Nuristani		Gujjar	Pashtun	Tajik/ Farsiwan	Others	Sources
Period	proper	Pashayi	Gujjar	Pashtun	Tajik/ Farsiwan	Others	Sources

2004–2021 (Islamic Republic)	>90 – >99%		<1 – 8%	∅	<1%	∅
2020 EU	1st	2nd	4th	3rd	5th	–
2018 UN	98% (Note: incl. 65% Katta, 20% Kalsha, 10% Wamayee, and 3% Passio.)	1%	∅	∅	–	∅ (Note: incl. Kordars.)
2015 CSSF (Note: Demographic information is based on data from 2015.)	>90%	–	8%	–	<1%	–
2015 CP	99% (Note: incl. the ethnic groups of Kata, Kunish, Pashai, Wama and Paroni.)		–	–	–	–
2015 NPS	99.3% (Note: incl. Kamozi (or Kam) Kushtaz, Kata, Ashtu (or Ahku) and Dardic- [i. e. Pashayi-]speaking people.)		0.6% (Note: seasonal population)	∅	0.1%	–
2011 PRT	99% (Note: incl. the ethnic groups of Kats, Kunish, Pashayi, Wama and Paroni, distributed into following tribes: 38% Katta, 30% Kalsha, 12% Ashkori, 10% Kam, 5% Satra and 4% Parooni.)		–	∅ (Note: incl. Kuchi.)	–	–
2011 USA	78%	15%	–	–	–	–
2009 ISW	∅	–	–	–	–	–
2009 MRRD	99%		–	∅	–	–

Legend:
- ∅: Ethnicity mentioned in source but not quantified
- –: Ethnicity not mentioned specifically
- Source abbreviations: Empirical sources: –, Government sources: CP – Colombo Plan, EU – European Union Agency for Asylum, MRRD – Ministry of Rural Rehabilitation and Development, PRT – Provincial Reconstruction Team of the United States government, UN – United Nations Assistance Mission in Afghanistan, Editorial sources: CSSF – Center for the Scientific Study of Families, ISW – Institute for the Study of War, NPS – Naval Postgraduate School, USA – United States Army

=== Education ===
In 2002 the first gender assessment of women's conditions in Nuristan was completed. The overall literacy rate (6+ years of age) fell from 17.7% in 2005 to 17% in 2011. The overall net enrolment rate (6–13 years of age) increased from 8.7% in 2005 to 45% in 2011.

=== Health ===
The percentage of households with clean drinking water increased from 2% in 2005 to 12% in 2011. The percentage of births attended by a skilled birth attendant increased from 1% in 2005 to 22% in 2011.

== In popular culture ==
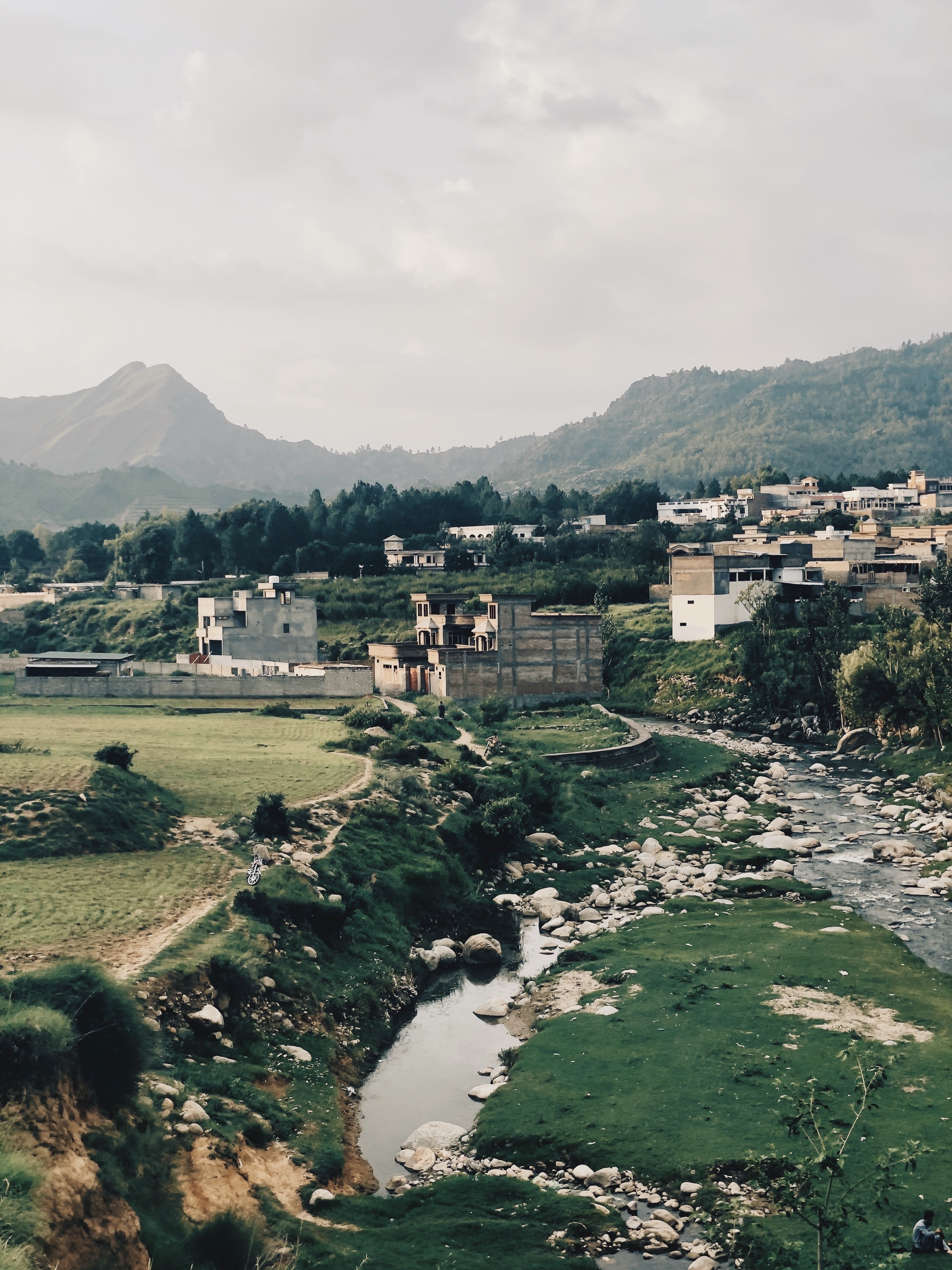
Northern Afghanistan by Kamran Shukoor

- Nuristan is the subject of the book A Short Walk in the Hindu Kush by the British travel writer Eric Newby.
- Nuristan was the location of three of the missions in Hitman 2: Silent Assassin.
- Rudyard Kipling's short story The Man Who Would Be King and the film inspired by it are set in "Kafiristan" (the earlier name of pre-Islamic Nuristan).
- Nuristan is the setting of the book Red Platoon by Medal of Honor recipient Clinton Romesha.
- Nuristan is where three young diplomats, American, English, and German visited in 1960 "...to penetrate a land that few westerners had set eyes on." Their book is A Passage to Nuristan: Exploring the Mysterious Afghan Hinterland by Joseph T. Kendrick (Author), Nicholas Barrington (Author), Reinhard Schlagintweit (Author), Sandy Gall (Foreword).

== Notable people ==
- Gen. Abdu Wakil Khan
- Gen. Ghorzi
- Ex. Mayor of Kabul Akbar
- Lt. Col. Jamaluddin Khan Nuristani
- Mohammad Qassim Jangulbagh
- Col. Pacha Gul Nuristani
- Tamim Nuristani Nuristani
- Jamaluddin Bader
- Hafeez Nuristani Nuristani
- Abdul Hai Warshan
- Ahmad Yusuf Nuristani
- Abdul Qadir Nuristani
- Mohammed Nadir Atash
- Col. Issa Khan Nuristani
- Khalilullah Nuristani
- General Sarwar Khan Nuristani
- Col. Noorullah Khan
- Col. Din Mohammad Khan
- Col. Haroon Khan
- Col. Jan Gul Khan
- Col. Jan Muhammad Khan
- Lt. Col. Nazar Muhammad Khan
- Abdul Wahid Nuristani

== See also ==
- Geography of Afghanistan
- Provinces of Afghanistan

== Sources ==
- Ansary, Tamim (2014). Games without Rules: The Often-Interrupted History of Afghanistan. PublicAffairs. ISBN 9781610393195.
- Barrington, Nicholas; Kendrick, Joseph T.; Schlagintweit, Reinhard (2006). A Passage to Nuristan: Exploring the Mysterious Afghan Hinterland. I.B. Tauris. ISBN 9781845111755.
- Klimberg, Max (2004). "NURISTAN". Encyclopædia Iranica (Online ed.). United States: Columbia University.
- Minahan, James B. (2014). Ethnic Groups of North, East, and Central Asia: An Encyclopedia. ABC-CLIO. ISBN 9781610690188.
- Ruhland, Heike (2019). Peacebuilding in Pakistan: A Study on the Religious Minorities and Initiatives for Interfaith Harmony. Waxmann Verlag.
- Vinogradov, A.G.; Zharnikova, S.V. (2020). Indo-European Ornamental Complexes and their Analogies in the Cultures of Eurasia.
- Witzel, Michael (2004). "Kalash Religion (extract from 'The Ṛgvedic Religious System and its Central Asian and Hindukush Antecedents')" (PDF). In A. Griffiths; J. E. M. Houben (eds.). The Vedas: Texts, Language and Ritual. Groningen: Forsten. pp. 581–636.

== External sources ==
- Nuristan Province by the Naval Postgraduate School (NPS)
- Nuristan Province by the Institute for the Study of War (ISW)
