= List of Achaemenid satraps of Cappadocia =

Achaemenid satraps of Cappadocia

This article lists the Achaemenid satraps of Cappadocia, an ancient region in central Anatolia. The Satrapy of Capadocia was a satrapy (province) of the Achaemenid Empire until its conquest by Alexander the Great in 331 BCE.

== Satraps of Cappadocia, c. 400–331 BCE ==
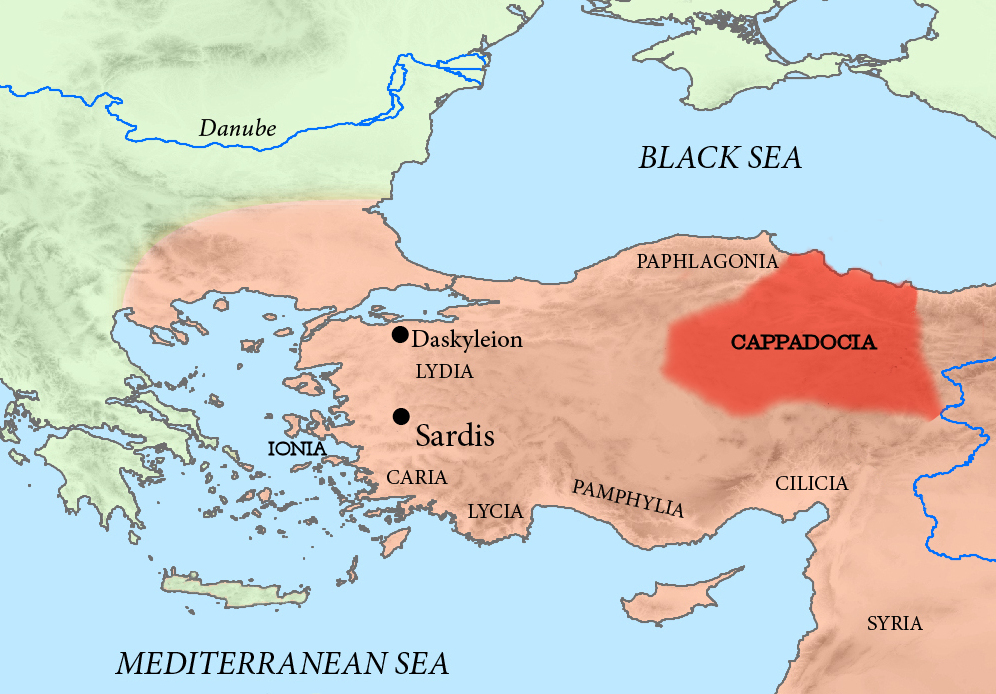
Achaemenid Cappadocia

- Cyrus the Younger, 408–401 BCE. Son of Darius II who held the satrapies of Lydia (including Ionia), Greater Phrygia, and Cappadocia. He died in 401 in battle during a failed attempt to oust his elder brother, Artaxerxes II, from the Persian throne.
- (uncertain) Camisares, c. 400-385 BCE. Damates inherited his father's satrapy. According to Diodorus Siculus, he was the satrap of Cappadocia, but according to Cornelius Nepos, he was the satrap of Cilicia. Around 370 BCE, Datames launched a revolt against king Artaxerxes II.
- (uncertain) Datames, c. 380s–362 BCE. According to Diodorus Siculus, he was the satrap of Cappadocia, but according to Cornelius Nepos, he was the satrap of Cilicia. Around 370 BCE, Datames launched a revolt against king Artaxerxes II.
- Ariamnes or Ariaramnes, 362–350 BCE. According to Siculus, he was the son of Datames, and 'Ariamnes ruled for fifty years and died without achieving anything worthy of note.'
- Mithrobuzanes, died 334 BCE. (Upper Cappadocia)
- Abistamenes or Sabictas, c. 334–320s BCE. (Upper Cappadocia). He is called Sabictas by Arrian, and was almost certainly a native Cappadocian.
- Ariarathes I, 340s–331 BCE (Lower Cappadocia)

== Bibliography ==
- Bing, J. Daniel (1998). "Datames and Mazaeus: The Iconography of Revolt and Restoration in Cilicia". Historia: Zeitschrift für Alte Geschichte. 47 (1): 41–76. JSTOR 4436493. (registration required)
- Dusinberre, Elspeth R. M. (2013). Empire, Authority, and Autonomy in Achaemenid Anatolia. Cambridge: Cambridge University Press. ISBN 978-1107577152.
- Olmstead, A. T. (1948). History of the Persian Empire (PDF). Chicago: University of Chicago Press. p. 670.
- Weiskopf, Michael (1990). "Cappadocia". In Yarshater, Ehsan (ed.). Encyclopædia Iranica. Vol. IV: Bāyju–Carpets XIV. London and New York: Routledge & Kegan Paul. pp. 780–786. ISBN 978-0-71009-132-1.
