= Indo-European languages =

Language family native to Eurasia

Indo-European
- Geographic distribution: Worldwide
- Native speakers: est. 3.4 billion
- Linguistic classification: One of the world's primary language families
- Proto-language: Proto-Indo-European
- Subdivisions: • Indo-Iranian • Italic • Germanic • Balto-Slavic • Hellenic • Albanian • Armenian • Celtic • Anatolian † • Tocharian †; Unclassified or poorly attested: • Ancient Cappadocian † • Dacian † • Elymian † • Liburnian † • Ligurian † • Lusitanian † • Paeonian † • Philistine (?) † • Phrygian † • Thracian † • Venetic † • Messapic †

Language codes
- ISO 639-2 / 5: ine
- Glottolog: indo1319
- The approximate distribution of the native speakers of the eight living branches of the Indo-European language family within Eurasia: Indo-Iranian Italic Germanic Balto-Slavic Hellenic Albanian Armenian Celtic Non-Indo-European languages, or outside Eurasia Dotted/striped areas indicate where multilingualism is common (more visible upon full enlargement of the map).
- Notes: † indicates this branch or language is extinct

The Indo-European languages are a language family native to the north of the Indian subcontinent, most of Europe, and Greater Iran, with additional native branches found in regions such as Armenia, parts of the southern Indian subcontinent (Sri Lanka and the Maldives), and even stretching as far as to mainland Southeast Asia (Rohingya language in Myanmar). Historically, Indo-European languages were also spoken in Anatolia and Northwestern China. The Indo-European family is divided into several branches, of which eight are still spoken: four by hundreds of millions of native speakers each (Indo-Iranian, Italic, Germanic, and Balto-Slavic), and four by fewer than fifteen million native speakers each (Hellenic, Albanian, Armenian, and Celtic). Two major branches are extinct (Anatolian and Tocharian), as are a number of other Indo-European languages.

Today the individual Indo-European languages with the most native speakers are Spanish, Hindustani (Hindi and Urdu), English, Portuguese, Bengali, Punjabi, Russian, Marathi, German, French, and Persian; many others spoken by smaller groups are in danger of extinction. Over 3.4 billion people (42% of the global population) speak an Indo-European language as a first language—by far the most of any language family. There are about 446 living Indo-European languages, according to an estimate by Ethnologue, of which 313 belong to the Indo-Iranian branch.

All Indo-European languages are descended from a single prehistoric language, linguistically reconstructed as Proto-Indo-European, spoken sometime during the Neolithic or early Bronze Age (c. 3300 – c. 1200 BC). The geographical location where it was spoken, the Proto-Indo-European homeland, has been the object of many competing hypotheses; the academic consensus supports the Kurgan hypothesis, which posits the homeland to be the Pontic–Caspian steppe in what is now Ukraine and Southern Russia, associated with the Yamnaya culture and other related archaeological cultures during the 4th and early 3rd millennia BC.

By the time the first written records appeared, Indo-European had already evolved into numerous languages, spoken across much of Europe and large parts of Asia (Central, West (Note: In the Anatolia, Cyprus, Armenian highlands and the Iranian plateau.) and South). Some European languages of this family—English, French, Portuguese, Russian, Spanish, and Dutch—have expanded through colonialism in the modern period and are now spoken across Africa, Americas, Oceania and North Asia.

Written evidence of Indo-European appeared during the Bronze Age in the form of Mycenaean Greek and the Anatolian languages of Hittite and Luwian. The oldest records are isolated Hittite words and names, interspersed in texts that are otherwise in the unrelated Akkadian language (a Semitic language) found in texts of the Assyrian colony of Kültepe in eastern Anatolia dating to the 20th century BC. Although no older written records of the original Proto-Indo-European population remain, some aspects of their culture and their religion can be reconstructed from later evidence in the daughter cultures. The Indo-European family is significant to the field of historical linguistics as it possesses the second-longest recorded history of any known family after Egyptian and the Semitic languages, which belong to the Afroasiatic language family. The analysis of the family relationships between the Indo-European languages, and the reconstruction of their common source, was central to the development of the methodology of historical linguistics as an academic discipline in the 19th century.

The current academic consensus in the field of linguistics does not accept any genetic relationships of the Indo-European language family with other language families, although several disputed hypotheses propose such relations.

== History of Indo-European linguistics ==
During the 16th century, European visitors to the Indian subcontinent began to notice similarities among Indo-Aryan, Iranian, and European languages. In 1583, English Jesuit missionary and Konkani scholar Thomas Stephens wrote a letter from Goa to his brother—published in the 20th century—in which he noted similarities between North Indian languages and Greek and Latin.

Another account was made by Filippo Sassetti, a merchant born in Florence in 1540, who travelled to the Indian subcontinent. Writing in 1585, he noted some word similarities between Sanskrit and Italian (these included devaḥ/dio 'God', sarpaḥ/serpe 'serpent', sapta/sette 'seven', aṣṭa/otto 'eight', and nava/nove 'nine'). However, neither Stephens' nor Sassetti's observations led to further scholarly inquiry.

In 1647, Dutch linguist and scholar Marcus Zuerius van Boxhorn noted the similarity among certain Asian and European languages and theorized that they were derived from a primitive common language that he called Scythian. He included in his hypothesis Dutch, Albanian, Greek, Latin, Persian, and German, later adding Slavic, Celtic, and Baltic languages. However, Van Boxhorn's suggestions did not become widely known and did not stimulate further research.

Ottoman Turkish traveller Evliya Çelebi visited Vienna in 1665–1666 as part of a diplomatic mission and noted a few similarities between words in German and in Persian. Gaston Coeurdoux and others made observations of the same type. Coeurdoux made a thorough comparison of Sanskrit, Latin, and Greek conjugations in the late 1760s to suggest a relationship among them. Meanwhile, Mikhail Lomonosov compared different language groups, including Slavic, Baltic ("Kurlandic"), Iranian ("Medic"), Finnish, Chinese, "Hottentot" (Khoekhoe), and others, noting that related languages (including Latin, Greek, German, and Russian) must have separated in antiquity from common ancestors.

The hypothesis reappeared in 1786 when Sir William Jones first lectured on the striking similarities among three of the oldest languages known in his time: Latin, Greek, and Sanskrit, to which he tentatively added Gothic, Celtic, and Persian, though his classification contained some inaccuracies and omissions. In one of the most famous quotations in linguistics, Jones made the following prescient statement in a lecture to the Asiatic Society of Bengal in 1786, conjecturing the existence of an earlier ancestor language, which he called "a common source" but did not name:

The Sanscrit [sic] language, whatever be its antiquity, is of a wonderful structure; more perfect than the Greek, more copious than the Latin, and more exquisitely refined than either, yet bearing to both of them a stronger affinity, both in the roots of verbs and the forms of grammar, than could possibly have been produced by accident; so strong indeed, that no philologer could examine them all three, without believing them to have sprung from some common source, which, perhaps, no longer exists. (Note: The sentence goes on to say, equally correctly as it turned out: "...here is a similar reason, though not quite so forcible, for supposing that both the Gothic and the Celtic, though blended with a very different idiom, had the same origin with the Sanscrit; and the old Persian might be added to the same family.")

— Sir William Jones, Third Anniversary Discourse delivered 2 February 1786, ELIOHS

Thomas Young first used the term "Indo-European" in 1813, deriving it from the geographical extremes of the language family: from Western Europe to North India. A synonym is Indo-Germanic (Idg. or IdG.), specifying the family's southeasternmost and northwesternmost branches. This first appeared in French (indo-germanique) in 1810 in the work of Conrad Malte-Brun; in most languages this term is now dated or less common than Indo-European, although in German indogermanisch remains the standard scientific term. A number of other synonymous terms have also been used.

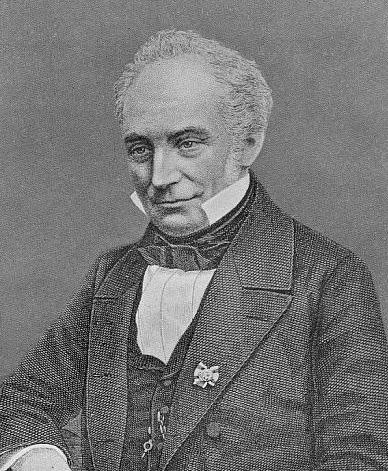
Franz Bopp was a pioneer in the field of comparative linguistic studies.

Franz Bopp wrote in 1816 "On the conjugational system of the Sanskrit language compared with that of Greek, Latin, Persian and Germanic" and between 1833 and 1852 he wrote Comparative Grammar. This marks the beginning of Indo-European studies as an academic discipline. The classical phase of Indo-European comparative linguistics leads from this work to August Schleicher's 1861 Compendium and up to Karl Brugmann's Grundriss, published in the 1880s. Brugmann's neogrammarian reevaluation of the field and Ferdinand de Saussure's development of the laryngeal theory may be considered the beginning of "modern" Indo-European studies. The generation of Indo-Europeanists active in the last third of the 20th century (such as Calvert Watkins, Jochem Schindler, and Helmut Rix) developed a better understanding of morphology and of ablaut in the wake of Kuryłowicz's 1956 Apophony in Indo-European, who in 1927 wrote about the existence of the Hittite consonant ḫ. Kuryłowicz's discovery supported Ferdinand de Saussure's 1879 proposal of the existence of coefficients sonantiques, elements de Saussure reconstructed to account for vowel length alternations in Indo-European languages. This led to the so-called laryngeal theory, a major step forward in Indo-European linguistics and a confirmation of de Saussure's theory.

== Classification ==
The various subgroups of the Indo-European language family include ten major branches, listed below in alphabetical order:

- Albanian, attested from the 13th century; Proto-Albanian evolved from an ancient Paleo-Balkan language, traditionally thought to be Illyrian, or otherwise a totally unattested Balkan Indo-European language that was closely related to Illyrian and Messapic.
- Anatolian, extinct by Late Antiquity, spoken in Anatolia, attested in isolated terms in Luwian/Hittite mentioned in Semitic Old Assyrian texts from the 20th and 19th centuries BC, Hittite texts from about 1650 BC. Among the text is the Anitta text in the Hittite language, which is also the oldest known text in an Indo-European language. It is dated to 1700 BCE.
- Armenian, attested from the early 5th century AD. It evolved from the Proto-Armenian language which, according to the Armenian hypothesis, developed in situ from the Proto-Indo-European language of the 3rd millennium BC.
- Balto-Slavic, believed by most Indo-Europeanists to form a phylogenetic unit, while a minority ascribes similarities to prolonged language-contact.
  - Slavic (from Proto-Slavic), attested from the 9th century AD (possibly earlier), earliest texts in Old Church Slavonic. Slavic languages include Bulgarian, Russian, Polish, Czech, Slovak, Silesian, Kashubian, Macedonian, Serbo-Croatian (Bosnian, Croatian, Montenegrin, Serbian), Sorbian, Slovenian, Ukrainian, Belarusian, and Rusyn.
  - Baltic, attested from the 14th century; although attested relatively recently, they retain many archaic features attributed to Proto-Indo-European (PIE). Living examples are Lithuanian and Latvian.
- Celtic (from Proto-Celtic), attested since the 6th century BC; Lepontic inscriptions date as early as the 6th century BC; Celtiberian from the 2nd century BC; Primitive Irish Ogham inscriptions from the 4th or 5th century AD, earliest inscriptions in Old Welsh from the 7th century AD. Modern Celtic languages include Welsh, Cornish, Breton, Scottish Gaelic, Irish and Manx.
- Germanic (from Proto-Germanic), earliest attestations in runic inscriptions from around the 2nd century AD, earliest coherent texts in Gothic, 4th century AD. Old English manuscript tradition from about the 8th century AD. Includes English, Frisian, German, Dutch, Scots, Danish, Swedish, Norwegian, Afrikaans, Yiddish, Low German, Icelandic, Elfdalian, and Faroese.
- Hellenic (from Proto-Greek, see also History of Greek); fragmentary records in Mycenaean Greek from between 1450 and 1350 BC have been found. Homeric texts date to the 8th century BC. Ancient Macedonian was either an ancient Greek dialect (part of Northwest Greek) or a Hellenic language.
- Indo-Iranian, attested c. 1400 BC, descended from Proto-Indo-Iranian (dated to the late 3rd millennium BC).
  - Indo-Aryan, attested from around 1400 BC in Hittite texts from Anatolia, showing traces of Indo-Aryan words. Epigraphically from the 3rd century BC in the form of Prakrit (Edicts of Ashoka). The Rigveda is assumed to preserve intact records via oral tradition dating from c. the mid-2nd millennium BC in the form of Vedic Sanskrit. Includes a wide range of modern languages from North India, Eastern Pakistan and Bangladesh, including Hindustani (Hindi, Urdu), Bengali, Odia, Assamese, Punjabi, Kashmiri, Gujarati, Marathi, Sindhi and Nepali, as well as Sinhala of Sri Lanka and Dhivehi of the Maldives and Minicoy. Contains unclassified languages within it, including Bhariati, Bazigar, and Sheikhgal.
  - Iranian or Iranic, attested from roughly 1000 BC in the form of Avestan. Epigraphically from 520 BC in the form of Old Persian (Behistun inscription). Includes Persian, Pashto, Kurdish, Balochi, Lari (Laristani), Luri, Tajik, and Ossetian.
  - Nuristani, attested since the 20th century, are among the newest Indo-European languages to be studied. Includes Katë, Prasun, Ashkun, Nuristani Kalasha, Tregami, and Zemiaki.
  - Badeshi, a critically endangered language spoken in Bishigram Valley of Pakistan. It is still considered as unclassified within the wider Indo-Iranian branch.
- Italic (from Proto-Italic), attested from the 7th century BC. Includes the ancient Osco-Umbrian languages, Faliscan, as well as Latin and its descendants, the Romance languages, such as Spanish, Portuguese, French, Italian and Romanian.
- Tocharian, with proposed links to the Afanasevo culture of Southern Siberia. Extant in two dialects (Turfanian and Kuchean, or Tocharian A and B), attested during roughly the 6th–9th centuries AD. Marginalized by the Old Turkic Uyghur Khaganate and probably extinct by the 10th century.

In addition to the classical ten branches listed above, several extinct and little-known languages and language groups have existed or are proposed to have existed:

- Ancient Belgian: hypothetical language associated with the proposed Nordwestblock cultural area. Speculated to be connected to Italic or Venetic, and to have certain phonological features in common with Lusitanian.
- Cimmerian: possibly Iranic, Thracian, or Celtic
- Dacian: possibly very close to Thracian
- Elymian: Poorly-attested language spoken by the Elymians, one of the three indigenous (i.e. pre-Greek and pre-Punic) tribes of Sicily. Indo-European affiliation widely accepted, possibly related to Italic or Anatolian.
- Illyrian: possibly related to Albanian, Messapian, or both
- Liburnian: evidence too scant and uncertain to determine anything with certainty
- Ligurian: possibly close to or part of Celtic.
- Lusitanian: possibly related to (or part of) Celtic, Ligurian, or Italic
- Messapic: not conclusively deciphered, often considered to be related to Albanian as the available fragmentary linguistic evidence shows common characteristic innovations and a number of significant lexical correspondences between the two languages
- Paionian: extinct language once spoken north of Macedon
- Phrygian: language of the ancient Phrygians. Very likely, but not certainly, a sister group to Hellenic.
- Sicel: an ancient language spoken by the Sicels (Greek Sikeloi, Latin Siculi), one of the three indigenous (i.e. pre-Greek and pre-Punic) tribes of Sicily. Proposed relationship to Latin or Proto-Illyrian (Pre-Indo-European) at an earlier stage.
- Sorothaptic: proposed, pre-Celtic, Iberian language
- Thracian: possibly including Dacian
- Venetic: shares several similarities with Latin and the Italic languages, but also has some affinities with other IE languages, especially Germanic and Celtic.

Indo-European family tree in order of first attestation

Indo-European language family tree based on "Ancestry-constrained phylogenetic analysis of Indo-European languages" by Chang et al. 2015

Membership of languages in the Indo-European language family is determined by genealogical relationships, meaning that all members are presumed descendants of a common ancestor, Proto-Indo-European. Membership in the various branches, groups, and subgroups of Indo-European is also genealogical, but here the defining factors are shared innovations among various languages, suggesting a common ancestor that split off from other Indo-European groups. For example, what makes the Germanic languages a branch of Indo-European is that much of their structure and phonology can be stated in rules that apply to all of them. Many of their common features are presumed innovations that took place in Proto-Germanic, the source of all the Germanic languages.

In the 21st century, several attempts have been made to model the phylogeny of Indo-European languages using Bayesian methodologies similar to those applied to problems in biological phylogeny. Although there are differences in absolute timing between the various analyses, there is much commonality between them, including the result that the first known language groups to diverge were the Anatolian and Tocharian language families, in that order.

=== Tree versus wave model ===
The "tree model" is considered an appropriate representation of the genealogical history of a language family if communities do not remain in contact after their languages have started to diverge. In this case, subgroups defined by shared innovations form a nested pattern. The tree model is not appropriate in cases where languages remain in contact as they diversify; in such cases subgroups may overlap, and the wave model is a more accurate representation. Most approaches to Indo-European subgrouping to date have assumed that the tree model is by-and-large valid for Indo-European; however, there is also a long tradition of wave-model approaches.

In addition to genealogical changes, many of the early changes in Indo-European languages can be attributed to language contact. It has been asserted, for example, that many of the more striking features shared by Italic languages (Latin, Oscan, Umbrian, etc.) might well be areal features. More certainly, very similar-looking alterations in the systems of long vowels in the West Germanic languages greatly postdate any possible notion of a proto-language innovation (and cannot readily be regarded as areal, either, because English and continental West Germanic were not a linguistic area). In a similar vein, there are many similar innovations in Germanic and Balto-Slavic that are far more likely areal features than traceable to a common proto-language, such as the uniform development of a high vowel (*u in the case of Germanic, *i/u in the case of Baltic and Slavic) before the PIE syllabic resonants *ṛ, *ḷ, *ṃ, *ṇ, unique to these two groups among IE languages, which is in agreement with the wave model. The Balkan sprachbund even features areal convergence among members of very different branches.

An extension to the Ringe-Warnow model of language evolution suggests that early IE had featured limited contact between distinct lineages, with only the Germanic subfamily exhibiting a less treelike behaviour as it acquired some characteristics from neighbours early in its evolution. The internal diversification of especially West Germanic is cited to have been radically non-treelike.

=== Proposed subgroupings ===
Specialists have postulated the existence of higher-order subgroups such as Italo-Celtic, Graeco-Armenian, Graeco-Aryan, and Balto-Slavo-Germanic. However, unlike the ten traditional branches, these are all controversial to a greater or lesser degree.

The Italo-Celtic subgroup was at one point uncontroversial, considered by Antoine Meillet to be even better established than Balto-Slavic. The main lines of evidence included the genitive suffix -ī; the superlative suffix -m̥mo; the change of /p/ to /kʷ/ before another /kʷ/ in the same word (as in penkʷe > *kʷenkʷe > Latin quīnque, Old Irish cóic); and the subjunctive morpheme -ā-. This evidence was prominently challenged by Calvert Watkins, while Michael Weiss has argued for the subgroup.

Evidence for a relationship between Greek and Armenian includes the regular change of the second laryngeal to a at the beginnings of words, as well as terms for "woman" and "sheep". Greek and Indo-Iranian share innovations mainly in verbal morphology and patterns of nominal derivation. Relations have also been proposed between Phrygian and Greek, and between Thracian and Armenian. Some fundamental shared features, like the aorist (a verb form denoting action without reference to duration or completion) having the perfect active particle -s fixed to the stem, link this group closer to Anatolian languages and Tocharian. Shared features with Balto-Slavic languages, on the other hand (especially present and preterit formations), might be due to later contacts.

The Indo-Hittite hypothesis proposes that the Indo-European language family consists of two main branches: one represented by the Anatolian languages and another branch encompassing all other Indo-European languages. Features that separate Anatolian from all other branches of Indo-European (such as the gender or the verb system) have been interpreted alternately as archaic debris or as innovations due to prolonged isolation. Points proffered in favour of the Indo-Hittite hypothesis are the (non-universal) Indo-European agricultural terminology in Anatolia and the preservation of laryngeals. However, in general this hypothesis is considered to attribute too much weight to the Anatolian evidence. According to another view, the Anatolian subgroup left the Indo-European parent language comparatively late, approximately at the same time as Indo-Iranian and later than the Greek or Armenian divisions. A third view, especially prevalent in the so-called French school of Indo-European studies, holds that extant similarities in non-satem languages in general, including Anatolian, might be due to their peripheral location in the Indo-European language-area and to early separation, rather than indicating a special ancestral relationship. Hans J. Holm, based on lexical calculations, arrives at a picture roughly replicating the general scholarly opinion and refuting the Indo-Hittite hypothesis.

=== Satem and centum languages ===
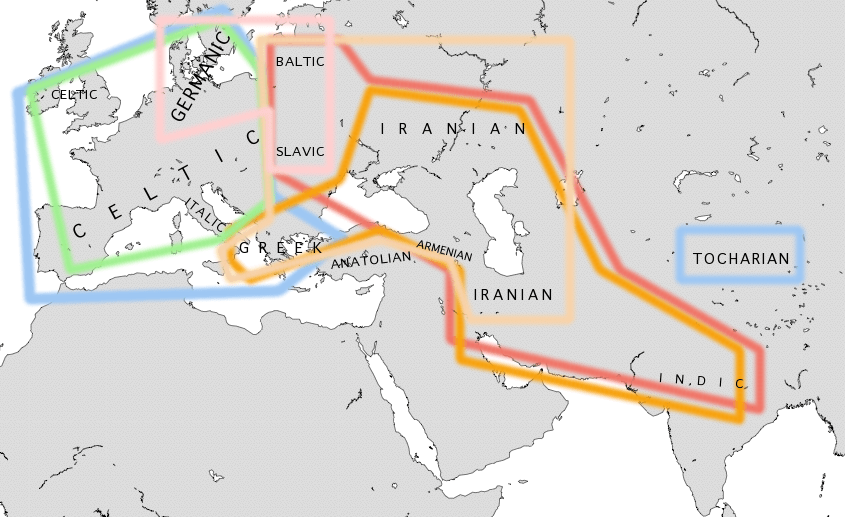
Some significant isoglosses in Indo-European daughter languages at around 500 BC. Blue: centum languages Red: satem languages Orange: languages with augment Green: languages with PIE *-tt- > -ss- Tan: languages with PIE *-tt- > -st- Pink: languages with instrumental, dative and ablative plural endings (and some others) in *-m- rather than *-bh-

The division of the Indo-European languages into satem and centum groups was put forward by Peter von Bradke in 1890, although Karl Brugmann did propose a similar type of division in 1886. In the satem languages, which include the Balto-Slavic and Indo-Iranian branches, as well as (in most respects) Albanian and Armenian, the reconstructed Proto-Indo-European palatovelars remained distinct and were fricativized, while the labiovelars merged with the 'plain velars'. In the centum languages, the palatovelars merged with the plain velars, while the labiovelars remained distinct. The results of these alternative developments are exemplified by the words for "hundred" in Avestan (satem) and Latin (centum)—the initial palatovelar developed into a fricative [s] in the former, but became an ordinary velar [k] in the latter.

Rather than being a genealogical separation, the centum–satem division is commonly seen as resulting from innovative changes that spread across PIE dialect-branches over a particular geographical area; the centum–satem isogloss intersects a number of other isoglosses that mark distinctions between features in the early IE branches. It may be that the centum branches in fact reflect the original state of affairs in PIE, and only the satem branches shared a set of innovations, which affected all but the peripheral areas of the PIE dialect continuum. Kortlandt proposes that the ancestors of Balts and Slavs took part in satemization before being drawn later into the western Indo-European sphere.

== Proposed external relations ==
From the beginning of Indo-European studies, there have been attempts to link the Indo-European languages genealogically to other languages and language families. No theory has gained majority support, and most specialists in Indo-European linguistics are sceptical or agnostic about such proposals.

Proposals linking the Indo-European languages with a single language family include:

- Indo-Uralic, joining Indo-European with Uralic
- Pontic, postulated by John Colarusso, which joins Indo-European with Northwest Caucasian

Other proposed families include:

- Nostratic, comprising all or some of the Eurasiatic languages and the Kartvelian, Dravidian—or wider, Elamo-Dravidian—and Afroasiatic language families
- Eurasiatic, a theory by Joseph Greenberg, comprising the Uralic, Altaic and various Paleosiberian families (Ainu, Yukaghir, Nivkh, Chukotko-Kamchatkan, Eskimo–Aleut) and possibly others

Nostratic and Eurasiatic, in turn, have been included in wider groupings, such as Borean, a language family separately proposed by Harold C. Fleming and Sergei Starostin that encompasses almost all of the world's natural languages with the exception of those native to sub-Saharan Africa, New Guinea, Australia, and the Andaman Islands.

== Evolution ==
=== Proto-Indo-European ===
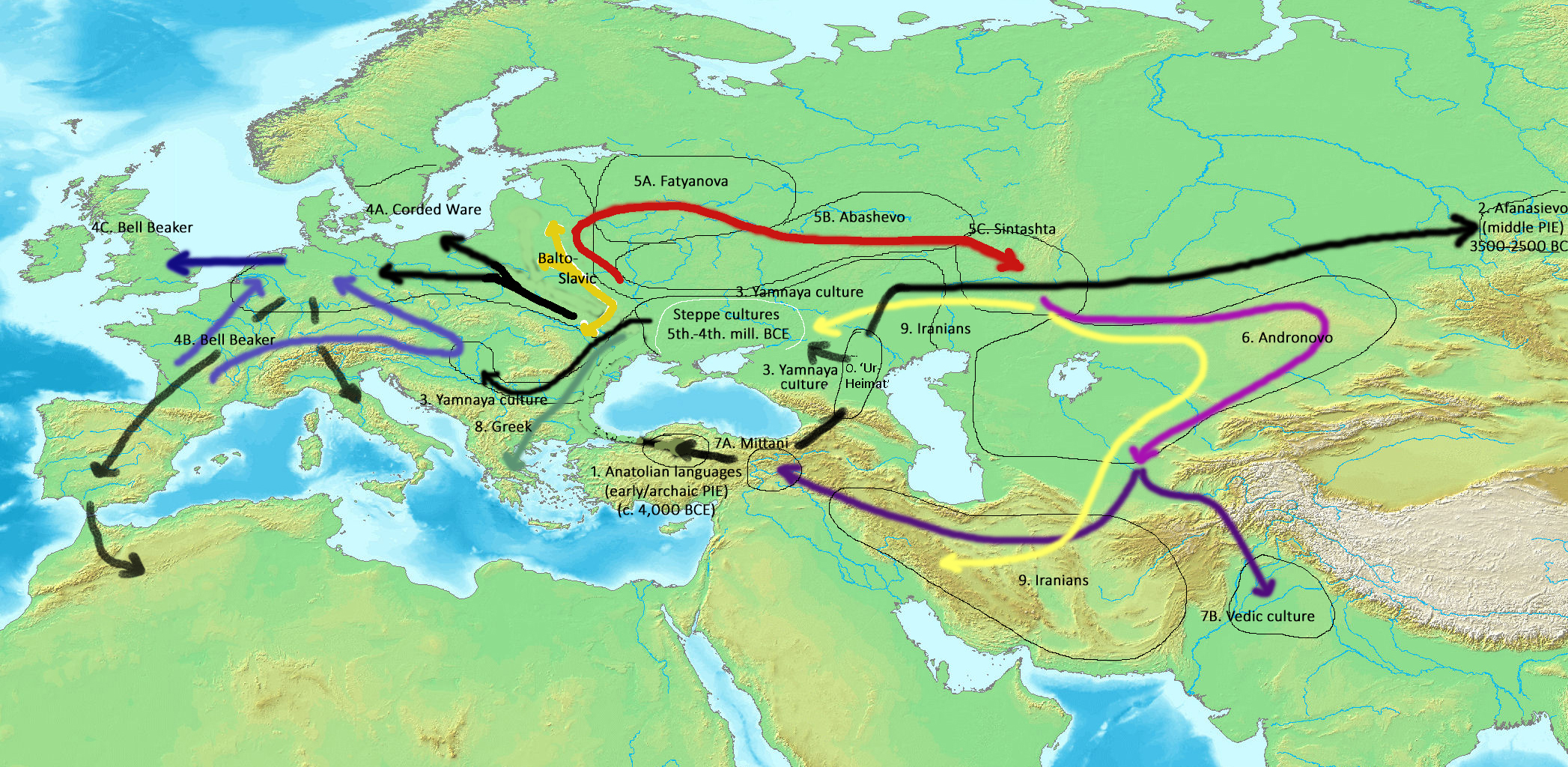
Scheme of Indo-European language dispersals from c. 4000 to 1000 BC, according to the widely held Kurgan hypothesis. – Center: Steppe cultures 1 (black): Anatolian languages (archaic PIE) 2 (black): Afanasievo culture (early PIE) 3 (black) Yamnaya culture expansion (Pontic-Caspian steppe, Danube Valley) (late PIE) 4A (black): Western Corded Ware 4B-C (blue & dark blue): Bell Beaker; adopted by Indo-European speakers 5A-B (red): Eastern Corded ware 5C (red): Sintashta (Proto-Indo-Iranian) 6 (magenta): Andronovo 7A (purple): Indo-Aryans (Mittani) 7B (purple): Indo-Aryans (India) [NN] (dark yellow): Proto-Balto-Slavic 8 (grey): Greek 9 (yellow):Iranians – [not drawn]: Armenian, expanding from western steppe

The proposed Proto-Indo-European language (PIE) is the reconstructed common ancestor of the Indo-European languages, spoken by the Proto-Indo-Europeans. During the 1960s, knowledge of Anatolian became certain enough to establish its relationship to PIE. Using the method of internal reconstruction, an earlier stage, called Pre-Proto-Indo-European, has been proposed.

PIE is an inflected language, in which the grammatical relationships between words were signalled through inflectional morphemes, usually endings. The roots of PIE are basic morphemes carrying a lexical meaning. By addition of suffixes, they form stems, and by addition of endings, these form grammatically inflected words, such as nouns or verbs. The reconstructed Indo-European verb system is complex and, like the noun, exhibits a system of ablaut.

=== Diversification ===
The diversification of the parent language into the attested branches of daughter languages is historically unattested. The timeline of the evolution of the various daughter languages and the ramifications are still subject to academic dispute.

Using a mathematical analysis borrowed from evolutionary biology, Donald Ringe and Tandy Warnow proposed the following evolutionary tree of Indo-European branches:

- Pre-Anatolian before 3500 BC
- Pre-Tocharian
- Pre-Italic and Pre-Celtic before 2500 BC
- Pre-Armenian and Pre-Greek after 2500 BC
- Proto-Indo-Iranian c. 2000 BC
- Pre-Germanic and Pre-Balto-Slavic; Proto-Germanic c. 500 BC

David Anthony proposes the following sequence:

- Pre-Anatolian c. 4200 BC
- Pre-Tocharian c. 3700 BC
- Pre-Germanic c. 3300 BC
- Pre-Italic and Pre-Celtic c. 3000 BC
- Pre-Armenian c. 2800 BC
- Pre-Balto-Slavic c. 2800 BC
- Pre-Greek c. 2500 BC
- Proto-Indo-Iranian c. 2200 BC; split into Iranian and Old Indic c. 1800 BC

From 1500 BC the following sequence may be given:

- 1500–1000 BC:
  - The Nordic Bronze Age of Scandinavia developed pre-Proto-Germanic, and the (pre-) Proto-Celtic Urnfield and Hallstatt cultures emerged in Central Europe, introducing the Iron Age.
  - Migration of the Proto-Italic speakers into the Italian peninsula (Bagnolo stele).
  - Migration of Aryans to India followed by the redaction of the Rigveda; rise of the Vedic civilization and beginning of Iron Age in the Punjab.
  - The Mycenaean civilization gave way to the Greek Dark Ages.
  - Hittite went extinct.
  - Iranian speakers started migrating southwards to Greater Iran.
  - Balto-Slavic split into ancestors of modern Baltic and Slavic.
- 1000–500 BC:
  - The Celtic languages spread over Central and Western Europe, including Britain.
  - Baltic languages were spoken in a large area from present-day Poland to Moscow.
  - Pre-Proto-Germanic gave rise to Proto-Germanic in southern Scandinavia.
  - Homer and the beginning of Classical Antiquity.
  - The Vedic civilization gave way to the Mahajanapadas as the Indo-Aryan tongue reaches eastwards, giving rise to the Greater Magadha cultural sphere, where Mahavira preached Jainism and Siddhartha Gautama preached Buddhism.
  - Zoroaster composed the Gathas, rise of the Achaemenid Empire, replacing the Elamites and Babylonia.
  - Separation of Proto-Italic into Osco-Umbrian, Latin-Faliscan, and possibly Venetic and Siculian.
  - A variety of Paleo-Balkan languages besides Greek were spoken in Southern Europe, including Thracian, Dacian and Illyrian, and in Anatolia (Phrygian).
  - Development of Prakrits across the Indian subcontinent, as well as migration of Indo-Aryan speakers to Sri Lanka and the Maldives.
- 500–1 BC, Classical Antiquity:
  - Spread of Greek and Latin throughout the Mediterranean and, during the Hellenistic period (Indo-Greeks), to Central Asia and the Hindukush.
  - The Magadhan power and influence rose in ancient India, especially with the conquests of the Nandan and Mauryan empires.
  - Germanic speakers started migrating southwards to occupy formerly Celtic territories.
  - Scythian cultures extended from Eastern Europe (Pontic Scythians) to Northwest China (Ordos culture).
- 1 BC–AD 500; Late Antiquity, Gupta period:
  - Attestation of Armenian. Proto-Slavic.
  - The Roman Empire and then the Germanic migrations marginalized the Celtic languages to the British Isles.
  - Sogdian, an eastern Iranian language, became the lingua franca of the Silk Road in Central Asia leading to China, due to the proliferation of Sogdian merchants there.
  - Greek settlements and Byzantine rule made the last Anatolian languages extinct.
  - Turkic languages started replacing Scythian languages.
- 500–1000, Early Middle Ages:
  - The Viking Age formed an Old Norse koine spanning Scandinavia, the British Isles and Iceland.
  - Phrygian became extinct.
  - The Islamic conquests and the Turkic expansion resulted in the Arabization and Turkification of significant areas where Indo-European languages were spoken, and Persian developed under Islamic rule and extended into Afghanistan and Tajikistan.
  - Due to further Turkic migrations, Tocharian became fully extinct while Scythian languages were overwhelmingly replaced.
  - Slavic languages spread over wide areas in central, eastern and southeastern Europe, largely replacing Romance in the Balkans—with the exception of Romanian—and whatever was left of the Paleo-Balkan languages—with the exception of Albanian.
  - Pannonian Basin was taken by the Magyars from the western Slavs.
- 1000–1500, Late Middle Ages:
  - Attestation of Albanian and Baltic.
  - Modern dialects of Indo-European languages started emerging.
- 1500–2000, early modern period to present:
  - Colonialism resulted in the spread of Indo-European languages to every habitable continent, most notably Romance (North, Central and South America, North and Sub-Saharan Africa, West Asia), West Germanic (English in North America, Sub-Saharan Africa, East Asia and Australia; to a lesser extent Dutch and German), and Russian to Central Asia and North Asia.

In a 2023 paper Paul Heggarty et al. have proposed an altogether longer chronology and a "hybrid model for the origin of Indo-European languages" between the "Steppe" hypothesis and the "Anatolian" hypothesis. Through a Bayesian phylogenetic analysis they have found an approximate root age for Indo-European of ~8120 years BP or 6740 to 9610 years BP. This had also implications for the ultimate homeland and the splitting-off of the various subclades. Pointing to the total lack of Steppe ancient DNA in Hittite Anatolia and the relative rarity of Steppe aDNA in several other phyla, Heggarty et al. posit that an Urheimat south of the Caucasus seems most probable, from where Indo-European spread first into Anatolia and later into the Pontic-Caspian Steppe. This would prolong the timeline of the Indo-European languages into the past.

=== Key languages for reconstruction ===
In reconstructing the history of the Indo-European languages and the form of the Proto-Indo-European language, some languages have been of particular importance. These generally include the ancient Indo-European languages that are both well-attested and documented at an early date, although some languages from later periods are important if they are particularly linguistically conservative, most notably, Lithuanian. Early poetry is of special significance because of the rigid poetic meter normally employed, which makes it possible to reconstruct a number of features, e.g. vowel length, that were either unwritten or corrupted in the process of transmission down to the earliest extant written manuscripts.

Most noticeably:

- Vedic Sanskrit (c. 1500–500 BC). This language is unique in that its source documents were all composed orally, and were passed down through oral tradition (shakha schools) for c. 2,000 years before being written down. The oldest documents are all in poetic form; oldest and most important of all is the Rigveda (c. 1500 BC). The oldest inscriptions in the language of the Rigveda, are found in northern Syria, where the Mitanni kingdom was located. Though it is also likely that the language of the Mitanni kingdom was a related but older Indo-Aryan language.
- Ancient Greek (c. 750–400 BC). Mycenaean Greek (c. 1450 BC) is the oldest recorded form, but its value is lessened by the limited material, restricted subject matter, and highly ambiguous writing system.More important is Ancient Greek, documented extensively beginning with the two Homeric poems (the Iliad and the Odyssey, c. 750 BC).
- Hittite (c. 1700–1200 BC). This is the earliest recorded of all Indo-European languages, and highly divergent from the others due to the early separation of the Anatolian languages from the remainder. It possesses some highly archaic features found fragmentarily, if at all, in other languages. It appears to have undergone many early phonological and grammatical changes which, combined with the ambiguities of its writing system, hinder its usefulness somewhat.

Other primary sources:

- Latin, attested in a large amount of poetic and prose material in the Classical period (c. 200 BC – AD 100) and limited Old Latin material from as early as c. 600 BC.
- Gothic (the most archaic well-documented Germanic language, c. AD 350), along with the combined witness of the other old Germanic languages: most importantly, Old English (c. 800–1000), Old High German (c. 750–1000) and Old Norse (c. 1100–1300, with limited earlier sources dating to c. AD 200).
- Old Avestan (c. 1700–1200 BC) and Younger Avestan (c. 900 BC). Documentation is sparse, but nonetheless quite important due to its highly archaic nature.
- Modern Lithuanian, with limited records in Old Lithuanian (c. 1500–1700).
- Old Church Slavonic (c. 900–1000).

Other secondary sources, due to poor attestation:

- Luwian, Lycian, Lydian and other Anatolian languages (c. 1400–400 BC).
- Oscan, Umbrian and other Old Italic languages (c. 600–200 BC)).
- Old Persian (c. 500 BC).
- Old Prussian (c. 1350–1600); more archaic than Lithuanian.

Other secondary sources, due to extensive phonological changes and relatively limited attestation:

- Old Irish (c. AD 700–850).
- Tocharian (c. AD 500–800), underwent large phonetic shifts and mergers in the proto-language, and has an almost entirely reworked declension system.
- Classical Armenian (c. AD 400–1000).
- Albanian (c. 1284 – present).

=== Sound changes ===
As speakers of Proto-Indo-European (PIE) dispersed, the language's sound system diverged as well, changing according to various sound laws evidenced in the daughter languages.

PIE is normally reconstructed with a complex system of 15 stop consonants, including an unusual three-way phonation or voicing distinction between voiceless, voiced and "voiced aspirated", i.e. breathy voiced, stops, and a three-way distinction among velar consonants—k-type sounds—between palatal ḱ ǵ ǵh, plain velar k g gh and labiovelar kʷ gʷ gʷh. The correctness of the terms palatal and plain velar is disputed. All daughter languages have reduced the number of distinctions among these sounds, often in divergent ways.

As an example, in English, one of the Germanic languages, the following are some of the major changes that happened:

1. As in other centum languages, the "plain velar" and "palatal" stops merged, reducing the number of stops from 15 to 12.
2. As in the other Germanic languages, the Germanic sound shift changed the realization of all stop consonants, with each consonant shifting to a different one:
  *bʰ → *b → *p → *f
  *dʰ → *d → *t → *θ
  *gʰ → *g → *k → *x (Later initial *x →*h)
  *gʷʰ → *gʷ → *kʷ → *xʷ (Later initial *xʷ →*hʷ)
  Each original consonant shifted one position to the right. For example, original *dʰ became *d, while original *d became *t and original *t became *θ (written th in English). This is the original source of the English sounds written f, th, h and wh. Examples, comparing English with Latin, where the sounds largely remain unshifted:
  For PIE p: piscis vs. fish; pēs, pēdis vs. foot; pluvium "rain" vs. flow; pater vs. father
  For PIE t: trēs vs. three; māter vs. mother
  For PIE d: decem vs. ten; pēdis vs. foot; quid vs. what
  For PIE k: centum vs. hund(red); capere "to take" vs. have
  For PIE kʷ: quid vs. what; quandō vs. when
3. Various further changes affected consonants in the middle or end of a word:
  - The voiced stops resulting from the sound shift were softened to voiced fricatives, or perhaps the sound shift directly generated fricatives in these positions.
  - Verner's law also turned some of the voiceless fricatives resulting from the sound shift into voiced fricatives or stops. This is why the t in Latin centum ends up as d in hund(red) rather than the expected th.
  - Most remaining h sounds disappeared, while remaining f and th became voiced. For example, Latin decem ends up as ten with no h in the middle (but note taíhun "ten" in Gothic, an archaic Germanic language). Similarly, the words seven and have have a voiced v (compare Latin septem, capere), while father and mother have a voiced th, although not spelled differently (compare Latin pater, māter).

None of the daughter-language families, except possibly Anatolian, particularly Luvian, reflect the plain velar stops differently from the other two series, and there is even a certain amount of dispute whether this series existed in PIE. The major distinction between centum and satem languages corresponds to the outcome of the PIE plain velars:

- The central satem languages—Indo-Iranian, Balto-Slavic, Albanian, and Armenian—reflect both plain velar and labiovelar stops as plain velars, often with secondary palatalization before a front vowel (e i ē ī). The palatal stops are palatalized and often appear as sibilants, usually distinct from the secondarily palatalized stops.
- The peripheral centum languages—Germanic, Italic, Celtic, Greek, Anatolian and Tocharian—reflect both palatal and plain velar stops as plain velars, while the labiovelars continue unchanged, often with later reduction into plain labial or velar consonants.

The three-way PIE distinction between voiceless, voiced and voiced aspirated stops is considered extremely unusual from the perspective of linguistic typology—particularly in the existence of voiced aspirated stops without a corresponding series of voiceless aspirated stops. None of the various daughter-language families continue it unchanged, with numerous resolutions to the unstable PIE situation:

- The Indo-Aryan languages preserve the three series unchanged and have evolved a fourth series of voiceless aspirated consonants.
- The Iranian languages probably passed through the same stage, subsequently changing the aspirated stops into fricatives.
- Greek converted the voiced aspirates into voiceless aspirates.
- Italic probably passed through the same stage, and reflects the voiced aspirates as f or h, or sometimes plain voiced stops in Latin.
- Celtic, Balto-Slavic, Anatolian, and Albanian merge the voiced aspirated into plain voiced stops.
- Germanic and Armenian change all three series in a chain shift, e.g. with bh b p becoming b p f, known as Grimm's law in Germanic.

Among the other changes affecting consonants are:

- The Ruki sound law, in which s becomes /ʃ/ after r, u, k, i in the satem languages.
- Loss of prevocalic p in Proto-Celtic.
- Development of prevocalic s to h in Proto-Greek, with later loss of h between vowels.
- Verner's law in Proto-Germanic.
- Grassmann's law, the dissimilation of aspirates, independently in Proto-Greek and Proto-Indo-Iranian.

There are various basic outcomes of PIE consonants in some of the most important daughter languages for the purposes of reconstruction.

Proto-Indo-European consonants and their reflexes in selected Indo-European daughter languages
PIE	Skr.	O.C.S.	Lith.	Greek	Latin	Old Irish	Gothic	English	Examples						
PIE	Skr.	O.C.S.	Lith.	Greek	Latin	Old Irish	Gothic	English	PIE	Eng.	Skr.	Gk.	Lat.	Lith. etc.	Prs.
*p	*p; *ph^{H}	*p				*Ø; *ch^{T} [x]	*f; `-*b- [β]	*f; -*v/f-	*pṓds ~ *ped-	foot	pád-	poús (podós)	pēs (pedis)	pãdas	Piáde
*t	*t; *th^{H}	*t				*t; -*th- [θ]	*þ [θ]; `-*d- [ð]; *t^{T-}	*th; `-*d-; *t^{T-}	*tréyes	three	tráyas	treĩs	trēs	trỹs	thri (old Persian)
*ḱ	*ś [ɕ]	*s	*š [ʃ]	*k	*c [k]	*c [k]; -*ch- [x]	*h; `-*g- [ɣ]	*h; -*Ø-; `-*y-	*ḱm̥tóm	hund(red)	śatám	he-katón	centum	šimtas	sad
*k	*k; *c^{E} [tʃ]; *kh^{H}	*k; *č^{E} [tʃ]; *c^{E'} [ts]	*k	*k	*c [k]	*c [k]; -*ch- [x]	*h; `-*g- [ɣ]	*h; -*Ø-; `-*y-	*kreuh₂ "raw meat"	OE hrēaw raw	kravíṣ-	kréas	cruor	kraûjas	xoreš
*kʷ	*k; *c^{E} [tʃ]; *kh^{H}	*k; *č^{E} [tʃ]; *c^{E'} [ts]	*k	*p; *t^{E}; *k^{(u)}	*qu [kʷ]; *c^{(O)} [k]	*c [k]; -*ch- [x]	*ƕ [ʍ]; `-*gw/w-	*wh; `-*w-	*kʷid, kʷod	what	kím	tí	quid, quod	kas, kad	ce, ci
*kʷ	*k; *c^{E} [tʃ]; *kh^{H}	*k; *č^{E} [tʃ]; *c^{E'} [ts]	*k	*p; *t^{E}; *k^{(u)}	*qu [kʷ]; *c^{(O)} [k]	*c [k]; -*ch- [x]	*ƕ [ʍ]; `-*gw/w-	*wh; `-*w-	*kʷekʷlom	wheel	cakrá-	kúklos		kãklas	carx
*b	*b; *bh^{H}	*b				*b [b]; -[β]-	*p								
*d	*d; *dh^{H}	*d				*d [d]; -[ð]-	*t		*déḱm̥(t)	ten, Goth. taíhun	dáśa	déka	decem	dẽšimt	dah
*ǵ	*j [dʒ]; *h^{H} [ɦ]	*z	*ž [ʒ]	*g		*g [ɡ]; -[ɣ]-	*k	*c / k; *ch^{E'}	*ǵénu, *ǵnéu-	OE cnēo knee	jā́nu	gónu	genu		zánu
*g	*g; *j^{E} [dʒ]; *gh^{H}; *h^{H,E} [ɦ]	*g; *ž^{E} [ʒ]; *dz^{E'}	*g	*g		*g [ɡ]; -[ɣ]-	*k	*c / k; *ch^{E'}	*yugóm	yoke	yugám	zugón	iugum	jùngas	yugh
*gʷ	*g; *j^{E} [dʒ]; *gh^{H}; *h^{H,E} [ɦ]	*g; *ž^{E} [ʒ]; *dz^{E'}	*g	*b; *d^{e}; *g^{(u)}	*u [w > v]; *gu^{n−} [ɡʷ]	*b [b]; -[β]-	*q [kʷ]	*qu	*gʷīw-	quick "alive"	jīvá-	bíos, bíotos	vīvus	gývas	ze-
*bʰ	*bh; *b^{..Ch}	*b		*ph; *p^{..Ch}	*f-; *b	*b [b]; -[β]-	*b [b]; -[β]-; -*f	*b; -*v/f-^{(rl)}	*bʰéroh₂	bear "carry"	bhar-	phérō	ferō	OCS berǫ	bar-
*dʰ	*dh; *d^{..Ch}	*d		*th; *t^{..Ch}	*f-; *d; *b^{(r),l,u-}	*d [d]; -[ð]-	*d [d]; -[ð]-; -*þ	*d	*dʰwer-, dʰur-	door	dvā́raḥ	thurā́	forēs	dùrys	dar
*ǵʰ	*h [ɦ]; *j^{..Ch}	*z	*ž [ʒ]	*kh; *k^{..Ch}	*h; *h/g^{R}	*g [ɡ]; -[ɣ]-	*g; -*g- [ɣ]; -*g [x]	*g; -*y/w-^{(rl)}	*ǵʰans-	goose, OHG gans	haṁsáḥ	khḗn	(h)ānser	žąsìs	gház
*gʰ	*gh; *h^{E} [ɦ]; *g^{..Ch}; *j^{E..Ch}	*g; *ž^{E} [ʒ]; *dz^{E'}	*g	*kh; *k^{..Ch}	*h; *h/g^{R}	*g [ɡ]; -[ɣ]-	*g; -*g- [ɣ]; -*g [x]	*g; -*y/w-^{(rl)}							
*gʷʰ	*gh; *h^{E} [ɦ]; *g^{..Ch}; *j^{E..Ch}	*g; *ž^{E} [ʒ]; *dz^{E'}	*g	*ph; *th^{E}; *kh^{(u)}; *p^{..Ch}; *t^{E..Ch}; *k^{(u)..Ch}	*f-; *g / -*u- [w];^{n}*gu [ɡʷ]	*g [ɡ]; -[ɣ]-	*g; *b-; -*w-;^{n}*gw	*g; *b-; -*w-	*sneigʷʰ-	snow	sneha-	nípha	nivis	sniẽgas	barf
*gʷʰ	*gh; *h^{E} [ɦ]; *g^{..Ch}; *j^{E..Ch}	*g; *ž^{E} [ʒ]; *dz^{E'}	*g	*ph; *th^{E}; *kh^{(u)}; *p^{..Ch}; *t^{E..Ch}; *k^{(u)..Ch}	*f-; *g / -*u- [w];^{n}*gu [ɡʷ]	*g [ɡ]; -[ɣ]-	*g; *b-; -*w-;^{n}*gw	*g; *b-; -*w-	*gʷʰerm-	??warm	gharmáḥ	thermós	formus	Latv. gar̂me	garm
*s	*s			*h-; -*s; *s^{(T)}; -*Ø-; [¯]^{(R)}	*s; -*r-	*s [s]; -[h]-	*s; `-*z-	*s; `-*r-	*septḿ̥	seven	saptá	heptá	septem	septynì	haft
*s	*ṣ^{ruki-} [ʂ]	*x^{ruki-} [x]	*š^{ruki-} [ʃ]	*h-; -*s; *s^{(T)}; -*Ø-; [¯]^{(R)}	*s; -*r-	*s [s]; -[h]-	*s; `-*z-	*s; `-*r-	*h₂eusōs "dawn"	east	uṣā́ḥ	āṓs	aurōra	aušra	báxtar
*m	*m					*m [m]; -[w̃]-	*m		*mūs	mouse	mū́ṣ-	mũs	mūs	OCS myšĭ	muš
*-m	-*m	-*˛ [˜]	-*n		-*m	-*n	-*Ø		*ḱm̥tóm	hund(red)	śatám	(he)katón	centum	OPrus simtan	sad
*n	*n	*n; -*˛ [˜]	*n						*nokʷt-	night	nákt-	núkt-	noct-	naktis	náštá
*l	*r (dial. *l)	*l							*leuk-	light	ruc-	leukós	lūx	laũkas	ruz
*r	*r								*h₁reudʰ-	red	rudhirá-	eruthrós	ruber	raũdas	sorx
*i̯	*y [j]	*j [j]		*z [dz > zd, z] / *h; -*Ø-	*i [j]; -*Ø-	*Ø	*j	*y	*yugóm	yoke	yugám	zugón	iugum	jùngas	yugh
*u̯	*v [ʋ]	*v	*v [ʋ]	*w > h / Ø	*u [w > v]	*f; -*Ø-	*w		*h₂weh₁n̥to-	wind	vā́taḥ	áenta	ventus	vėtra	bád
PIE	Skr.	O.C.S.	Lith.	Greek	Latin	Old Irish	Gothic	English							

Notes:

- C- At the beginning of a word.
- -C- Between vowels.
- -C At the end of a word.
- `-C- Following an unstressed vowel (Verner's law).
- -C-^{(rl)} Between vowels, or between a vowel and *r, l (on either side).
- C^{T} Before a (PIE) stop (*p, t, k).
- C^{T−} After a (PIE) obstruent (*p, t, k, etc.; *s).
- C^{(T)} Before or after an obstruent (*p, t, k, etc.; *s).
- C^{H} Before an original laryngeal.
- C^{E} Before a (PIE) front vowel (*i, e).
- C^{E'} Before secondary (post-PIE) front-vowels.
- C^{e} Before *e.
- C^{(u)} Before or after a (PIE) *u (boukólos rule).
- C^{(O)} Before or after a (PIE) *o, u (boukólos rule).
- C^{n−} After *n.
- C^{R} Before a sonorant (*r, l, m, n).
- C^{(R)} Before or after a sonorant (*r, l, m, n).
- C^{(r),l,u−} Before *r, l or after *r, u.
- C^{ruki−} After *r, u, k, i (Ruki sound law).
- C^{..Ch} Before an aspirated consonant in the next syllable (Grassmann's law, also known as dissimilation of aspirates).
- C^{E..Ch} Before a (PIE) front vowel (*i, e) as well as before an aspirated consonant in the next syllable (Grassmann's law, also known as dissimilation of aspirates).
- C^{(u)..Ch} Before or after a (PIE) *u as well as before an aspirated consonant in the next syllable (Grassmann's law, also known as dissimilation of aspirates).

=== Comparison of conjugations ===
Aa comparison of conjugations of the thematic present indicative of the verbal root *bʰer- of the English verb to bear and its reflexes in various early attested IE languages and their modern descendants or relatives, shows that all languages had in the early stage an inflectional verb system.

	Proto-Indo-European (*bʰer- 'to carry, to bear')
I (1st sg.)	*bʰéroh₂
You (2nd sg.)	*bʰéresi
He/She/It (3rd sg.)	*bʰéreti
We two (1st dual)	*bʰérowos
You two (2nd dual)	*bʰéreth₁es
They two (3rd dual)	*bʰéretes
We (1st pl.)	*bʰéromos
You (2nd pl.)	*bʰérete
They (3rd pl.)	*bʰéronti

Major subgroup	Hellenic	Indo-Iranian		Italic	Celtic	Armenian	Germanic	Balto-Slavic		Albanian
Major subgroup	Hellenic	Indo-Aryan	Iranian	Italic	Celtic	Armenian	Germanic	Baltic	Slavic	Albanian
Ancient representative	Ancient Greek	Vedic Sanskrit	Avestan	Latin	Old Irish	Classical Armenian	Gothic	Old Prussian	Old Church Sl.	Old Albanian
I (1st sg.)	phérō	bʰárāmi	barāmi	ferō	biru; berim	berem	baíra /bɛra/	*bera	berǫ	*berja
You (2nd sg.)	phéreis	bʰárasi	barahi	fers	biri; berir	beres	baíris	*bera	bereši	*berje
He/She/It (3rd sg.)	phérei	bʰárati	baraiti	fert	berid	berē	baíriþ	*bera	beretъ	*berjet
We two (1st dual)	—	bʰárāvas	barāvahi	—	—	—	baíros	—	berevě	—
You two (2nd dual)	phéreton	bʰárathas	—	—	—	—	baírats	—	bereta	—
They two (3rd dual)	phéreton	bʰáratas	baratō	—	—	—	—	—	berete	—
We (1st pl.)	phéromen	bʰárāmas	barāmahi	ferimus	bermai	beremkʿ	baíram	*beramai	beremъ	*berjame
You (2nd pl.)	phérete	bʰáratha	baraθa	fertis	beirthe	berēkʿ	baíriþ	*beratei	berete	*berjeju
They (3rd pl.)	phérousi	bʰáranti	barəṇti	ferunt	berait	beren	baírand	*bera	berǫtъ	*berjanti
Modern representative	Modern Greek	Hindustani	Persian	Portuguese	Irish	Armenian (Eastern; Western)	German	Lithuanian	Slovene	Albanian
I (1st sg.)	férno	(ma͠i) bʰarūm̥	(man) {mi}baram	{con}firo	beirim	berum em; g'perem	(ich) {ge}bäre	beriu	bérem	(unë) bie
You (2nd sg.)	férnis	(tū) bʰarē	(tu) {mi}bari	{con}feres	beirir	berum es; g'peres	(du) {ge}bierst	beri	béreš	(ti) bie
He/She/It (3rd sg.)	férni	(ye/vo) bʰarē	(ān) {mi}barad	{con}fere	beiridh	berum ē; g'perē	(er/sie/es) {ge}biert	beria	bére	(ai/ajo) bie
We two (1st dual)	—	—	—	—	—	—	—	beriava	béreva	—
You two (2nd dual)	—	—	—	—	—	—	—	beriata	béreta	—
They two (3rd dual)	—	—	—	—	—	—	—	beria	béreta	—
We (1st pl.)	férnume	(ham) bʰarēm̥	(mā) {mi}barim	{con}ferimos	beirimid; beiream	berum enkʿ; g'perenkʿ	(wir) {ge}bären	beriame	béremo	(ne) biem
You (2nd pl.)	férnete	(tum) bʰaro	(šomā) {mi}barid	{con}feris	beirthidh	berum ekʿ; g'perekʿ	(ihr) {ge}bärt	beriate	bérete	(ju) bini
They (3rd pl.)	férnun	(ye/vo) bʰarēm̥	(ānān) {mi}barand	{con}ferem	beirid	berum en; g'peren	(sie) {ge}bären	beria	bérejo; berọ́	(ata/ato) bien

Similarities are visible between the modern descendants and relatives of these ancient languages, and the differences have increased over time. Some IE languages have moved from synthetic verb systems to largely periphrastic systems. Some of these verbs have undergone a change in meaning as well.

- In Modern Irish beir usually only carries the meaning to bear in the sense of bearing a child; its common meanings are to catch, grab. Apart from the first person, the comparative forms are dialectical or obsolete. The second and third person forms are typically instead conjugated periphrastically by adding a pronoun after the verb: beireann tú, beireann sé/sí, beireann sibh, beireann siad.
- The Hindustani (Hindi and Urdu) verb bʰarnā, the continuation of the Sanskrit verb, can have a variety of meanings, but the most common is "to fill". The comparative forms are etymologically derived from the present indicative, and now have the meaning of future subjunctive. The loss of the present indicative in Hindustani is roughly compensated by the periphrastic habitual indicative construction, using the habitual participle (etymologically from the Sanskrit present participle bʰarant-) and an auxiliary: ma͠i bʰartā hū̃, tū bʰartā hai, vah bʰartā hai, ham bʰarte ha͠i, tum bʰarte ho, ve bʰarte ha͠i (masculine forms).
- The Gothic forms are a close approximation of what the early West Germanic forms of c. 400 AD would have looked like. The descendant of Proto-Germanic *beraną (English bear) survives in German only in the compound gebären, meaning "bear (a child)".
- The Latin verb ferre is irregular, and not representative of a normal thematic verb. In most Romance languages such as Portuguese, other verbs now mean "to carry" (e.g. Pt. portar < Lat. portare) and ferre was borrowed and nativized only in compounds such as sofrer "to suffer" (from Latin sub- and ferre) and conferir "to confer" (from Latin con- and ferre).
- In Modern Greek, phero φέρω (modern transliteration fero) "to bear" is still in specific contexts and is most common in such compounds as αναφέρω, διαφέρω, εισφέρω, εκφέρω, καταφέρω, προφέρω, προαναφέρω, προσφέρω etc. The form that is very common today is pherno φέρνω (modern transliteration ferno) meaning "to bring". Additionally, the perfective form of pherno, used for the subjunctive voice and also for the future tense, is also phero.
- The dual forms are archaic in standard Lithuanian, and are now used only in some dialects, e.g. Samogitian.
- Among modern Slavic languages, only Slovene continues to have a dual number in the standard variety.

== Present distribution ==
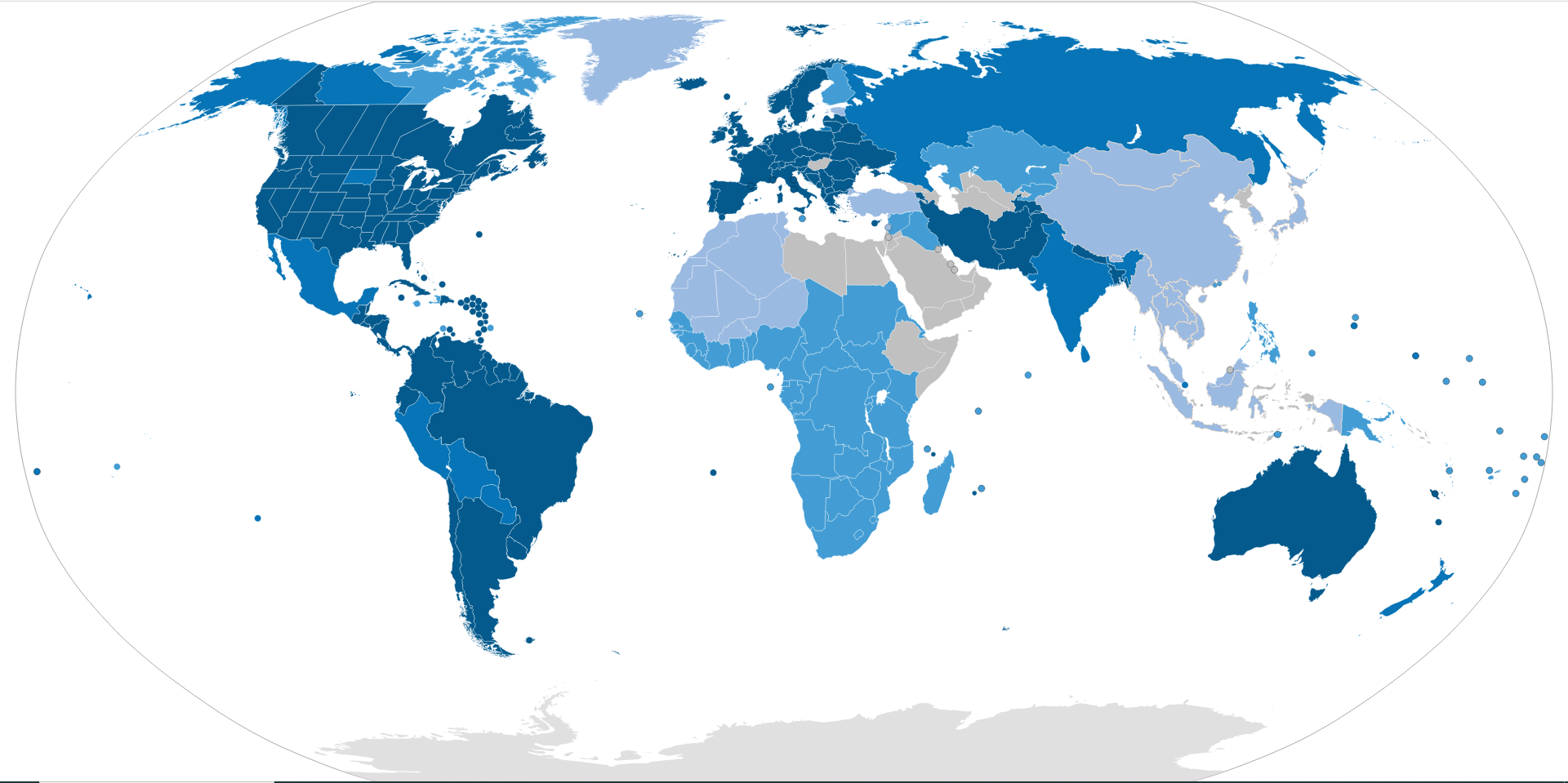
An Indo-European language is the majority native language An Indo-European language is a co-official and majority native language An Indo-European language is an official but minority native language An Indo-European language is a cultural or secondary language An Indo-European language is not widely spoken

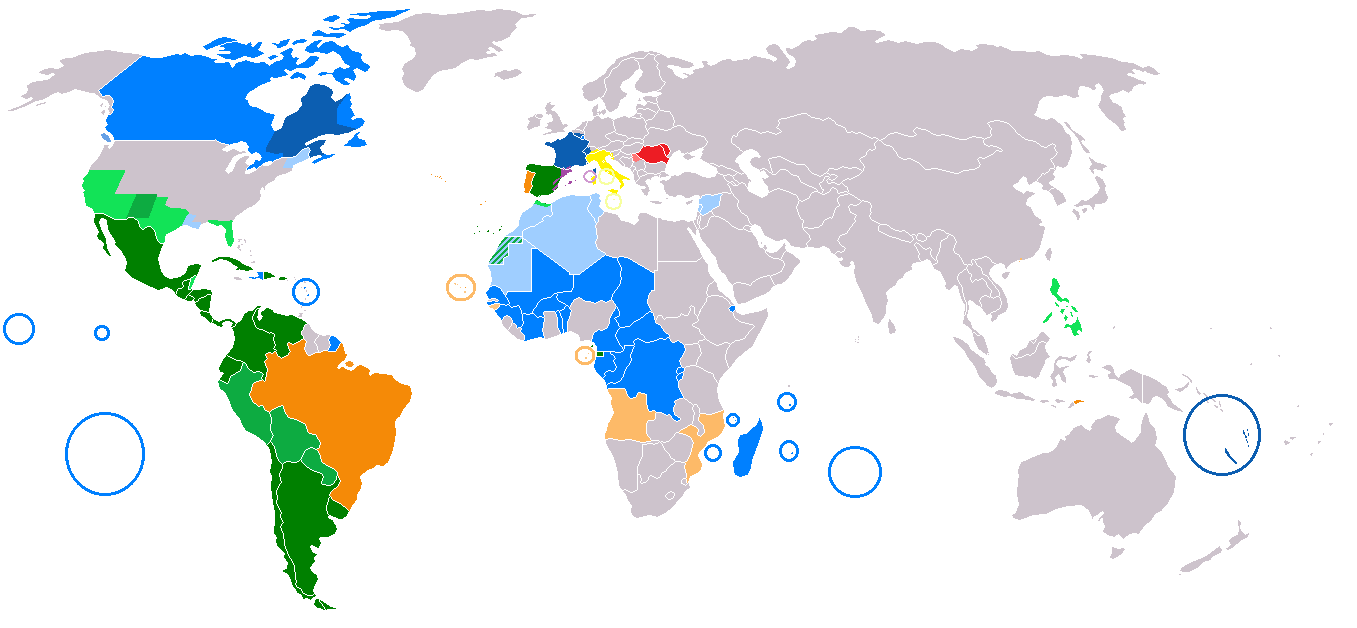
Romance languages in the world

In the current century, Indo-European languages are spoken by billions of native speakers across all inhabited continents, the largest number by far for any recognized language family. Of the less than a dozen languages with over 100 million native speakers, seven are Indo-European: Spanish, Hindustani, English, Portuguese, Bengali, Punjabi, and Russian. Additionally, hundreds of millions of persons worldwide study Indo-European languages as secondary or tertiary languages, including in cultures which have completely different language families and historical backgrounds—there are around 600 million learners of English, for example.

The success of the language family, including the large number of speakers and the vast portions of the Earth that they inhabit, is due to several factors. The ancient Indo-European migrations and widespread dissemination of Indo-European culture throughout Eurasia, including that of the Proto-Indo-Europeans themselves, and that of their daughter cultures including the Indo-Aryans, Iranian peoples, Celts, Greeks, Romans, Germanic peoples, and Slavs, led to these peoples' branches of the language family already taking a dominant foothold in virtually all of Eurasia except for swathes of West, North and East Asia, replacing many of the previously-spoken pre-Indo-European languages of this extensive area. Semitic languages remain dominant in much of West Asia and North Africa, and Caucasian languages in much of the Caucasus region. Similarly in Europe and the Urals the Uralic languages, such as Hungarian, Finnish and Estonian, remain, as does Basque, a pre-Indo-European isolate.

Before becoming aware of the common linguistic origin, diverse groups of Indo-European speakers continued to culturally dominate and often replace the indigenous languages of the western two-thirds of Eurasia. By the beginning of the Common Era, Indo-European peoples controlled almost the entirety of this area: the Celts western and central Europe, the Romans southern Europe, the Germanic peoples northern Europe, the Slavs eastern Europe, the Iranian peoples most of western and central Asia and parts of eastern Europe, and the Indo-Aryan peoples in the Indian subcontinent, with the Tocharians inhabiting the Indo-European frontier in western China. By the medieval period, the Semitic, Dravidian, Caucasian, and Uralic languages, and the language isolate Basque remained of the indigenous languages of Europe and the western half of Asia.

Alongside medieval invasions by Eurasian nomads, a group to which the Proto-Indo-Europeans had once belonged, Indo-European expansion reached another peak in the early modern period with the dramatic increase in the population of the Indian subcontinent and European expansionism throughout the globe during the Age of Discovery, as well as the continued replacement and assimilation of surrounding non-Indo-European languages and peoples due to increased state centralization and nationalism. These trends compounded throughout the modern period due to the general global population growth and the results of European colonization of the Western Hemisphere and Oceania, leading to an explosion in the number of Indo-European speakers as well as the territories inhabited by them.

Due to colonization and the modern dominance of Indo-European languages in the fields of politics, global science, technology, education, finance, and sports, many modern countries whose populations largely speak non-Indo-European languages have Indo-European languages as official languages, and the majority of the global population speaks at least one Indo-European language. The overwhelming majority of languages used on the Internet are Indo-European, with English continuing to lead the group; English in general has in many respects become the lingua franca of global communication.

== See also ==
- Eurasiatic languages – Proposed language macrofamily
- Grammatical conjugation – Contextual alterations of verbs
- The Horse, the Wheel, and Language – 2007 book by David W. Anthony
- Indo-European copula – Presence of the verb "to be" in Indo-European languages
- Indo-European sound laws
- Indo-European studies – Subfield of linguistics
- Indo-Semitic languages – Obsolete language hypothesis
- Indo-Uralic languages – Hypothetical language family consisting of Indo-European and Uralic
- Language family – Group of languages related through a common ancestor
- Languages of Asia
- Languages of Europe
- Languages of India
- Linguistics – Scientific study of language
- List of Indo-European languages
- Proto-Indo-European root – Most basic form of words in the Proto-Indo-European language
- Proto-Indo-European religion
