= Cappadocian (disambiguation) =

Cappadocian refers to someone or something from Cappadocia, a region in Asia Minor (Anatolia), in modern Turkey.

Cappadocian can also refer to:

- Cappadocian Greeks, an ethnic Greek community native to the region of Cappadocia
- Cappadocian Greek, a dialect of the Greek language, formerly spoken in Cappadocia
- Cappadocian Fathers, three prominent ancient Christian writers from Cappadocia:
  - Basil of Caesarea (c. 330 – 379)
  - Gregory of Nyssa (c. 335 – c. 395)
  - Gregory of Nazianzus (c. 329 – c. 390)
- Cappadocian calendar, a calendar formerly used in Cappadocia, derived from the Persian Zoroastrian calendar
- Saint Arsenios the Cappadocian (1840-1924)
- Ancient Cappadocians, an Anatolian ethnic group from Antiquity native to the region of Cappadocia
  - Ancient Cappadocian language, the unattested language of the ancient Cappadocians

== See also ==
- Cappadocia (disambiguation)
