= Ancient Cappadocian language =

Unattested extinct language of Anatolia

Ancient Cappadocian
- (unattested)
- Region: Cappadocia
- Ethnicity: Ancient Cappadocians
- Extinct: c. 6th century AD
- Language family: unclassified (Anatolian branch of Indo-European?)

Language codes
- ISO 639-3: None (mis)
- Glottolog: None

The ancient Cappadocian language is an unattested language once spoken in antiquity in Cappadocia, a historical region of central Anatolia in modern-day Turkey. There are no known texts written in Cappadocian, although classical Greek writers identified Cappadocian as distinct from Greek, and a few Greek words were attributed to a Cappadocian origin. The language also influenced the pronunciation of Greek spoken by Cappadocians, whose accent was infamous among classical authors, but there is no evidence for a corresponding influence on Greek grammar or vocabulary.

Although Cappadocian does not have a secure linguistic classification, it likely belonged to the Anatolian branch of the Indo-European languages, probably as a relative or descendant of Luwian. This view is supported by recurring Anatolian elements in personal and place names in Cappadocia and its history as part of the Anatolian-speaking Hittite Empire during the Bronze Age. Prior to the modern understanding of Anatolian languages in the twentieth century, Cappadocian was variously considered part of the Semitic family, part of other known branches of Indo-European, or part of an Anatolian language family unrelated to any other known languages.

Cappadocian became extinct by the sixth century AD when it was fully replaced by Greek. Despite nineteenth-century claims to the contrary, the ancient Cappadocian language has had no demonstrable influence on the Modern Greek dialect of Cappadocian Greek.

== Background ==
Cappadocia is a historical region in central Anatolia in modern-day Turkey. During the Bronze Age, Cappadocia was dominated by the Hittite Empire, consisting primarily of speakers of the Hittite and Luwian languages, both part of the Anatolian branch of the Indo-European language family. After the start of the Iron Age, in the tenth century BC, a loose group of polities known as Tabal emerged in Cappadocia and on the southern Anatolian plateau. Tabal is not a precise geopolitical term but designates the area in central Anatolia displaying Syro-Anatolian culture, including the usage of Hieroglyphic Luwian inscriptions.

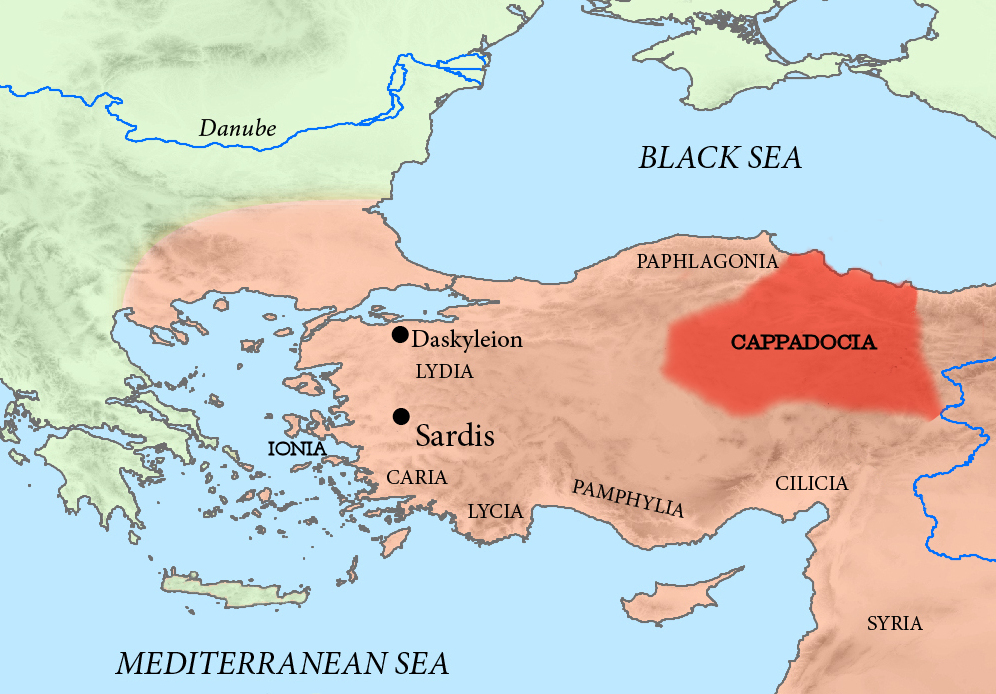
The Satrapy of Cappadocia within the Achaemenid Empire (c. 500 BC)

The Kingdom of Phrygia and the Assyrian Empire expanded into central Anatolia in the seventh century BC, annexing the Syro-Anatolian polities, the remains of which disappeared completely by the sixth century BC. By the fifth century BC, Cappadocia had become a satrapy of the Achaemenid Empire under Darius the Great. In the fourth century BC, after Alexander the Great's conquests, the final Persian ruler of Cappadocia, Ariarathes, founded the Kingdom of Cappadocia. The Ariarathid dynasty ruled the Kingdom of Cappadocia until it was annexed as a Roman province in 17 AD. Despite being Persian in origin, Ariarathid rulers were philhellene, promoting Greek culture and the Greek language.

The first-century-BC Greek geographer Strabo defined Cappadocia as being bounded by the "Cilician Taurus" to the south, Armenia and Colchis to the east, the Euxine (Black Sea) to the north, and tribes of Paphlagonians and Galatians to the west. According to Strabo, all of Cappadocia within those boundaries spoke a common Cappadocian language. Cappadocian remained spoken as a language into the first millennium AD, though bilingualism with Greek was widespread, as it was for most languages in Asia Minor.

== Classification ==
=== Classical sources ===
Cappadocian is unattested, meaning that there are no known texts written in the language. Thus, it cannot be securely classified. The only positive statement about Cappadocian's affiliation comes from Strabo, who states that it was related to Cataonian, another unattested language in the region of Cataonia. Strabo notes that by his time, the people of Cataonia had been completely assimilated into Cappadocian culture, no longer retaining any distinctive language.

One certainty about Cappadocian is that it was distinct from Greek. Gregory of Nyssa, one of the three fourth-century theologians known collectively as the Cappadocian Fathers, cites words for heaven in several languages:

ἡμεῖς οὐρανὸν τοῦτο λέγομεν, σαμαΐμ ὁ Ἑβραῖος, ὁ Ῥωμαῖος κελούμ, καὶ ἄλλως ὁ Σύρος, ὁ Μῆδος, ὁ Καππαδόκης, ὁ Μαυρούσιος, ὁ Σκύθης, ὁ Θρᾷξ, ὁ Aἰγύπτιος

[We call it ouranós, the Hebrew šamáyim, the Roman caelum, and still otherwise the Syrian, the Median, the Cappadocian, the Moor, the Scythian, the Thracian, the Egyptian.]

The linguist Mark Janse concludes from this that Cappadocian was not Greek or any of the other languages mentioned, and that it was also unlikely that Cappadocian was a Northwest Semitic language or closely related to Aramaic, since the Cappadocian Fathers seem to be unfamiliar with Aramaic. For example, in the quote above, Gregory of Nyssa seems to be unaware that the Aramaic word for heaven, ܫܡܝܐ (šěmayyâ), was very similar to the Hebrew שָׁמַיִם (šamáyim). This is further evidenced by the absence of any detectable Aramaic influence in the modern Cappadocian Greek dialect.

=== Early scholarship ===
The eighteenth-century theologian Paul Ernst Jablonski was the first to study the Cappadocian language through the collation and analysis of classical sources. His work was primarily intended to show that the Lycaonian language was a dialect of Cappadocian, but he was unable to come to any conclusions on the basis of linguistic evidence. Jablonski and some other scholars, such as the nineteenth-century historian Maximilian Wolfgang Duncker, believed that Cappadocian was a Semitic language. As evidence, they cited classical designations of Cappadocians as Leucosyroi (White Syrians)—as Semitic languages were spoken in the region of Syria—and classical accounts of Cappadocians having a taboo on eating pork and practising circumcision, which were customs associated with speakers of other Semitic languages. Other nineteenth-century Western scholars, such as the orientalist Paul de Lagarde and the historian Eduard Meyer, argued that Cappadocian was an Iranian language within the Indo-European family. This argument was supported by the Kingdom of Cappadocia having rulers with Iranian personal names and using a calendar with Iranian month names.

In 1885, the historian Pavlos Karolidis published a book claiming that some ancient Cappadocian words had been preserved in the modern dialect of Cappadocian Greek spoken in Pharasa, and identified Cappadocian as an Indo-European language most closely related to Phrygian and Armenian. His theory was not widely accepted, and many words he identified as ancient Cappadocian were shown to also be present in other varieties of Modern Greek. Karolidis's methodology was criticized as "entirely uncritical" and "no more than guesswork" in a 1916 book by the archaeologist Richard MacGillivray Dawkins.

In 1896, the linguist Paul Kretschmer proposed that during antiquity, there had been a single unidentified language family occupying most of Anatolia, citing common elements in place names and personal names. In particular, he identified the elements -nd- and -ss-, which occurred particularly frequently in the regions of Cappadocia, Cataonia, Cilicia, Pamphylia, Pisidia, Lycia, Caria, and Lydia in southern and central Anatolia. For the element -nd-, Kretschmer's examples in Cappadocia include towns such as Soandos and Dasmenda. Kretschmer's identification of a single major language family in Anatolia was well received. It was novel at the time, as previous scholars had tried to divide the languages of Anatolia among the surrounding known language families of Indo-European, Semitic, and the families of the Caucasus.

=== Modern scholarship ===
Although Kretschmer's thesis of Anatolian linguistic unity remained accepted, his characterization of the Anatolian family as not Indo-European was shown to be erroneous when Anatolian languages were first deciphered in the early twentieth century. Hittite was deciphered first in 1917, after the discovery of cuneiform tablets from the second millennium BC, and quickly shown to belong to the Indo-European family. Then, Anatolian languages in first-millennium-BC inscriptions began to be interpreted, starting with Lycian, which was also shown to be Indo-European. By the middle of the century, the patterns in personal and place names that had earlier been identified in classical Greek sources and first-millennium-BC inscriptions were also found in the Anatolian languages of the second millennium BC, and many such elements received Indo-European etymologies.

According to the linguist and Hittitologist Günter Neumann, the uniformity of names in Anatolia is a convincing argument for their linguistic uniformity. Since some languages within this region, such as Lycian, are securely established as belonging to the Anatolian branch of the Indo-European family, it follows that the other, more poorly documented languages in the region—including Cappadocian—were likely also Anatolian.

According to Mark Janse, Cappadocian was likely a descendant or relative of the Luwian language spoken in the Iron Age kingdom of Tabal in the same region. Janse connects the designation of Cappadocians as Leucosyroi in Greek sources to the Hittite dominance of Syria during the Bronze Age. As a parallel, Janse points to the Akkadian term māt Ḫatti ('land of the Hittites'), which had denoted Cappadocia during the Old Babylonian and Middle Babylonian periods of the second millennium BC, but had also come to denote Syria in the Neo-Babylonian period starting in the first millennium BC. The linguist Zsolt Simon identifies the region of sura—mentioned in Hieroglyphic Luwian inscriptions—with Cappadocia on the basis of the Greek term.

== Properties ==
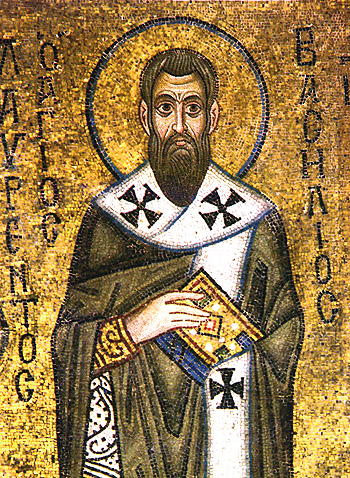
Basil of Caesarea was a speaker of Cappadocian.

Basil of Caesarea, one of the Cappadocian Fathers, wrote that in Greek the wording of the doxology may vary between "with (σύν) God's Holy Spirit", and "and (καί) God's Holy spirit", but in his native Cappadocian language, the use of "and" instead of "with" is obligatory.

Some words of neither Latin nor Greek origin have been described in classical Greek sources as "Cappadocian":

- The word μῶλυ (mōlu), which denotes an unidentified kind of plant in the Homeric epics, was identified by the physician and botanist Dioscorides (1st century AD) as the Cappadocian term for Peganum harmala, the wild rue. Zsolt Simon introduces it as a "Cappadocian (and thus presumably Luwian) word".
- The writer Athenaeus (3rd century AD) quotes a treatise on baking by the otherwise unknown author Chrysippus of Tyana, (Note: Some scholars have suspected that Chrysippus of Tyana was not a real author but a fabrication by Athenaeus, since the quoted passage contains unusually many Latin loanwords, which were appropriate for Athenaeus's audience but would have been out of place for an earlier Greek treatise.) who describes a type of Cappadocian pastry named πλίκιον (plikion). The word has been compared to the Latin root plec- found in the word plecto 'beat', although the linguist Eleanor Dickey is not convinced, labeling it "not Latin". It has also been compared to the Hittite word punniki, which similarly refers to a kind of baked good.
- Athenaeus also quotes the Athenian author Menander (4th century BC), who uses the word κόνδυ (kondu), meaning 'a large container', in a scene set in Cappadocia. The lexicographer Julius Pollux (2nd century AD) also mentions a "Cappadocian kondu" in his Onomasticon. This word has been compared with the Hittite word kankur, which also denotes a large drinking vessel of some kind, but Simon, labeling the Greek word as "of unknown origin", is skeptical of the connection to Hittite. The linguist Oswald Szemerényi instead compares kondu with Akkadian kandu 'pitcher', but both the Hittite and Akkadian comparisons are dismissed by the linguist Rafał Rosół in favor of the Iranian words kandu and kandūka, the latter of which was also loaned into Old Armenian as քանդուկ (k'anduk), meaning 'jar'.
- According to the lexicographer Hesychius of Alexandria (6th century AD), νηεξίς (nēexis) is a word for a rodent native to Cappadocia.
- In the Byzantine encyclopedia Etymologicum Genuinum (9th century AD), the word κόμμανα (kommana) is glossed as 'shady' in the related Cataonian language, and is cited as the etymology for the names of the kingdom of Commagene and the city of Comana. This gloss has been compared with the Hittite word kamarra, which was thought to mean 'shade, darkness'. The Hittite word is now known to mean 'mist, fog', but still considered a plausible origin for the Cataonian word by the historian Olivier Casabonne.

=== Influence on Greek ===
Due to the effects of language contact, Cappadocians spoke Greek with a notorious accent. According to Strabo, Cappadocians were known to "speak Greek like a barbarian". Lucian, a rhetorician in the 2nd century AD, is said to have said that "it was easier to find white ravens or winged turtles than a decent Cappadocian orator". In the 3rd century AD, the philosopher Philostratus explicitly describes the Cappadocian accent of Pausanias of Caesarea (2nd century AD):

ἀπήγγειλε παχείᾳ τῇ γλώττῃ καὶ ὡς Καππαδόκαις ξύνηθες, ξυγκρούων μὲν τὰ ξύμφωνα τῶν στοιχείων, συστέλλων δὲ τὰ μηκυνόμενα καὶ μηκύνων τὰ βραχέα

[He delivered his declamations with a heavy accent, as is the way with Cappadocians, making his consonants collide, shortening the long syllables, and lengthening the short ones.]

Although the Greek spoken by Cappadocians was heavily influenced by the Cappadocian language in its phonology and phonetics, there is no evidence for any corresponding interference in the grammar or lexicon of the Cappadocian-influenced Greek in antiquity. There is also no evidence of any Cappadocian influence in the modern variety of Cappadocian Greek.

== Extinction ==
It is uncertain when Cappadocian became extinct. References to the language in early Christian literature confirm that it was still spoken in the fourth century and possibly also in the fifth century, but over the second half of the first millennium, there are no known sources that discuss the language of the Cappadocians, native or otherwise. The historian Speros Vryonis writes that by the 6th century, Greek had mostly replaced the indigenous languages of western and central Anatolia, including Cappadocia, dismissing claims by earlier scholars that any had survived into the second millennium, which were made without evidence. The Isaurian language, another likely Anatolian language spoken in the neighboring Taurus Mountains, likely outlived Cappadocian, surviving into the sixth century.
