= Cappadocia (disambiguation) =

Cappadocia is a historical region of Asia Minor, in modern Turkey.

Cappadocia can also refer to:

- Gregory of Cappadocia, installed as Patriarch of Alexandria against Saint Athanasius
- Cappadocia (satrapy), a province of the Achaemenid Empire, covering the region
- Kingdom of Cappadocia, a Hellenistic kingdom founded by the last satrap of Achaemenid Cappadocia
- Cappadocia (Roman province), a province of the Roman Empire, covering the region
- Cappadocia (theme), a Byzantine province
- Cappadocia, Abruzzo, a comune in Italy
- Cappadocia (TV series), a Mexican television series

== See also ==
- Cappadocian (disambiguation)
