= Cappadocian language =

Cappadocian language may refer to:

- Ancient Cappadocian language, an Indo-European language of the Anatolian group spoken in ancient Asia Minor
- Cappadocian Greek, the Greek dialect spoken in Cappadocia until 1923.
