= Indo-Iranian languages =

Branch of the Indo-European language family

Indo-Iranian
- Indo-Iranic, Aryan
- Geographic distribution: South Asia, Central Asia, West Asia, and the Caucasus
- Native speakers: est. 1.7 billion (2024)
- Linguistic classification: Indo-European: Indo-Iranian
- Proto-language: Proto-Indo-Iranian
- Subdivisions: Indo-Aryan (Note: A fourth independent branch, Dardic, was previously posited, but recent scholarship in general places Dardic languages as archaic members of the Indo-Aryan branch); Iranian; Nuristani; Badeshi (unclassified)

Language codes
- ISO 639-5: iir
- Glottolog: indo1320
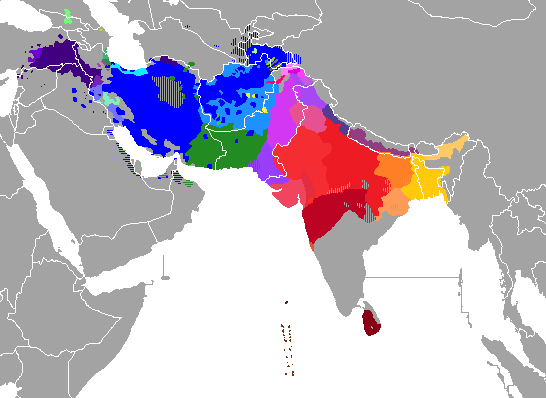
- Distribution of the Indo-Iranian languages

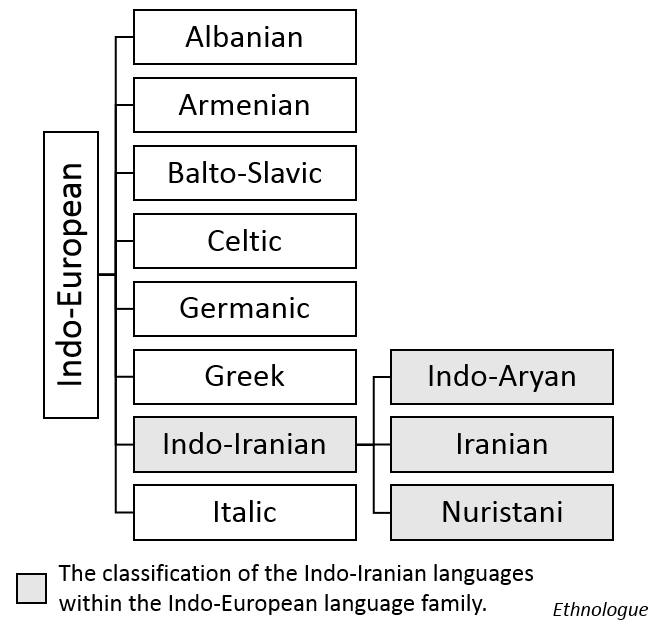
Chart classifying Indo-Iranian languages within the Indo-European language family

The Indo-Iranian languages, also known as Indo-Iranic languages, or Aryan languages, constitute the largest branch of the Indo-European language family. They include over 300 languages, spoken by around 1.7 billion speakers worldwide, predominantly in South Asia, West Asia and parts of Central Asia.

Indo-Iranian languages are divided into three major branches: Indo-Aryan, Iranian (or Iranic), and Nuristani languages. The Badeshi language remains unclassified within the Indo-Iranian branch. The largest Indo-Iranian language is the Hindustani language (which comprises the two variants Hindi and Urdu).

The areas with Indo-Iranian languages stretch from Europe (Romani) and the Caucasus (Ossetian, Tat, Talysh), down to Mesopotamia and eastern Anatolia (Kurdish, Zaza), the Levant and North Africa (Domari), and Iranian plateau, eastward to Xinjiang (Sarikoli) and Assam (Assamese), and south to Sri Lanka (Sinhala) and the Maldives (Maldivian), with branches stretching as far out as Oceania and the Caribbean for Fiji Hindi and Caribbean Hindustani respectively. Furthermore, there are large diaspora communities of Indo-Iranian speakers in Northwestern Europe, North America, Oceania, East Africa, South Africa, the Caribbean, and the Persian Gulf.

== Etymology ==
The term Indo-Iranian languages refers to the spectrum of Indo-European languages spoken in the Southern Asian region of Eurasia, spanning from the Indian subcontinent (where the Indo-Aryan branch is spoken, also called Indic) up to the Iranian Plateau (where the Iranian branch is spoken, also called Iranic).

This branch is also known as Aryan languages, referring to the languages spoken by Aryan peoples, where the term Aryan is considered as the ethnocultural self-designation of ancient Indo-Iranians. Today, the term Aryan is generally avoided, owing to the perceived negative connotation associated with Aryanism.

== Classification ==
Below is an abridged classification scheme of the Indo-Iranian languages. The Badeshi language remains unclassified within the Indo-Iranian branch.

- Proto-Indo-European (reconstructed)
  - Proto-Indo-Iranian (reconstructed)
    - Proto-Iranian (reconstructed)
      - Iranian languages (Iranic languages)
        - Eastern
        - Western
    - Proto-Nuristani (reconstructed)
      - Nuristani languages
    - Proto-Indo-Aryan (reconstructed)
      - Indo-Aryan languages
        - Dardic
        - Northwestern
        - Northern
        - Western
        - Central
        - Eastern
        - Southern
        - Chinali-Lahul (unclassified)
    - Badeshi (unclassified)

== Origin ==
All Indo-Iranian languages can be traced back to a single hypothetical ancestral language: Proto-Indo-Iranian, which is the reconstructed proto-language to represent the latest point at which all modern-day Indo-Iranian languages were still unified. Proto-Indo-Iranian, in turn, is classified as belonging to the Indo-European language family, ultimately tracing back to the Proto-Indo-European language.

Historically, the Proto-Indo-Iranian speakers are thought to have originally referred to themselves using the reconstructed Proto-Indo-Iranian root *Áryas, from which it derives terms like Aryavarta (Sanskrit: आर्यावर्त, lit. 'Land of the Aryans'), Airyanem Vaejah (Avestan: 𐬀𐬌𐬭𐬌𐬌𐬀𐬥𐬆𐬨 𐬬𐬀𐬉𐬘𐬀𐬵, lit. 'Expanse of the Arya'), Alania (*Aryāna), Iran (*Aryānām), and "Aryan".

The Proto-Indo-Iranian-speakers are generally associated with the Sintashta culture, which is thought to represent an eastward migration of peoples from the Corded Ware culture, which, in turn, is believed to represent an earlier westward migration of Yamnaya-related people from the Pontic–Caspian steppe zone into the territory of late Neolithic European cultures, possibly bringing with them the Proto-Indo-European language. However, the exact genetic relationship between the Yamnaya culture, Corded Ware culture and Sintashta culture remains unclear.

The earliest known chariots have been found in Sintashta burials, and the culture is considered a strong candidate for the origin of the technology, which spread throughout the Old World and played an important role in ancient warfare. There is almost a general consensus among scholars that the Andronovo culture, the successor of Sintasha culture, was an Indo-Iranian culture. Currently, only two sub-cultures are considered as part of Andronovo culture: Alakul and Fëdorovo cultures. The Andronovo culture is considered as an "Indo-Iranic dialect continuum", with a later split between Iranian and Indo-Aryan languages. However, according to Hiebert, an expansion of the Bactria–Margiana Archaeological Complex (BMAC) into Iran and the margin of the Indus Valley is "the best candidate for an archaeological correlate of the introduction of Indo-Iranian speakers to Iran and South Asia", despite the absence of the characteristic timber graves of the steppe in the Near East, or south of the region between Kopet Dag and Pamir-Karakorum. (Note: Sarianidi states that "direct archaeological data from Bactria and Margiana show without any shade of doubt that Andronovo tribes penetrated to a minimum extent into Bactria and Margianian oases".) J. P. Mallory acknowledges the difficulties of making a case for expansions from Andronovo to northern India, and that attempts to link the Indo-Aryans to such sites as the Beshkent and Vakhsh cultures "only gets the Indo-Iranian to Central Asia, but not as far as the seats of the Medes, Persians or Indo-Aryans". He has developed the Kulturkugel (lit. 'the culture bullet') model that has the Indo-Iranians taking over cultural traits of BMAC, but preserving their language and religion while moving into Iran and India.

== Sources ==
- Allentoft, Morten E.; et al. (11 June 2015). "Population genomics of Bronze Age Eurasia". Nature. 522 (7555). Nature Research: 167–172. Bibcode:2015Natur.522..167A. doi:10.1038/nature14507. PMID 26062507. S2CID 4399103.
- Anthony, David W. (2007). The Horse, the Wheel, and Language. Princeton, NJ: Princeton University Press. ISBN 978-0-691-05887-0.
- Chintalapati, Manjusha; Patterson, Nick; Moorjani, Priya (18 July 2022). "The spatiotemporal patterns of major human admixture events during the European Holocene". eLife. 11 (11) e77625. doi:10.7554/eLife.77625. PMC 9293011. PMID 35635751.
- Lubotsky, Alexander (2023). "Indo-European and Indo-Iranian Wagon Terminology and the Date of the Indo-Iranian Split". In Willerslev, Eske; Kroonen, Guus; Kristiansen, Kristian (eds.). The Indo-European Puzzle Revisited: Integrating Archaeology, Genetics, and Linguistics. Cambridge: Cambridge University Press. pp. 257–262. ISBN 978-1-009-26175-3.
- Narasimhan, Vagheesh M.; et al. (6 September 2019). "The formation of human populations in South and Central Asia". Science. 365 (6457) eaat7487. American Association for the Advancement of Science. bioRxiv 10.1101/292581. doi:10.1126/science.aat7487. PMC 6822619. PMID 31488661.
- Bryant, Edwin (2001), The Quest for the Origins of Vedic Culture: The Indo-Aryan Migration Debate, Oxford University Press, ISBN 978-0-19-513777-4.
- Fussman, G.; Kellens, J.; Francfort, H. P.; Tremblay, X. (2005). Āryas, aryens et iraniens en Asie centrale. Paris: Collège de France. ISBN 2-86803-072-6.
- Mallory, J. P. (1997). Encyclopedia of Indo-European Culture. Taylor & Francis. ISBN 978-1-884964-98-5.
- Mallory, J. P.; Mair, Victor H. (2008). The Tarim Mummies: Ancient China and the Mystery of the Earliest Peoples from the West. Thames & Hudson. ISBN 978-0-500-28372-1.
- Mathieson, Iain (23 November 2015). "Genome-wide patterns of selection in 230 ancient Eurasians". Nature. 528 (7583): 499–503. Bibcode:2015Natur.528..499M. doi:10.1038/nature16152. PMC 4918750. PMID 26595274.
- Parpola, Asko (2015), The Roots of Hinduism. The Early Aryans and the Indus Civilization, Oxford University Press
- Schmitt, Rüdiger (1987). "Aryans". Encyclopædia Iranica. Vol. 2. Iranica Foundation.
