= Badeshi =

Indo-Iranian language spoken in Pakistan

- Badeshi written in Nastaliq
- Native to: Pakistan
- Region: Bishigram Valley, Chail
- Ethnicity: Badeshi people
- Native speakers: 3 (2018)
- Language family: Indo-European: Indo-Iranian; (unclassified); Badeshi
- Writing system: Arabic script, words also transcribed in Latin script

Language codes
- ISO 639-3: bdz
- Glottolog: bade1240

Badeshi is an unclassified Indo-Iranian language spoken in northern Pakistan. The language is critically endangered and considered at risk of extinction. In 2018, the BBC found three men who could still speak the language.

Muhammad Zaman Sagar, a field linguist connected to the Forum for Language Initiative, has worked on this language. But as a result of his research, after two years, he collected only about one hundred words. According to Sagar, evidence from this word list indicates that the language belonged to the Indo-Aryan branch of the broader Indo-Iranian family. In July 2007, he visited the Bishigram Valley again and spent some days with the people there. There are efforts to retain a record of the language by linguist Zubair Torwali among others. Torwali has posited that it may be related to Yidgha or Wakhi.

== Usage ==
In 2018, BBC reporters found three old men (Said Gul, Ali Sher and Rahim Gul) who could still speak Badeshi in the Bishigram Valley in Northern Pakistan. They claimed that the language had initially been spoken by nine or ten families in their village, but that the Torwali language had taken over. The men had also worked in tourist areas in the Swat Valley, where they spoke Pashto. Some romanised phrases of Badeshi were:

- Meen naao Rahim Gul thi – My name is Rahim Gul
- Meen Badeshi jibe aasa – I speak Badeshi
- Theen haal khale thi? – How do you do?
- May grot khekti – I have eaten
- Ishu kaale heem kam ikthi – There is not much snowfall this year
