= Bagnolo stele =

Stone boulders found in Italy with Chalcolithic engravings

The Bagnolo steles are two stone boulders found in Ceresolo-Bagnolo, Malegno commune, Brescia province, Lombardia, Northern Italy, at the base of Monte Mignone, at an altitude of ca. 700 m (2,300 ft).

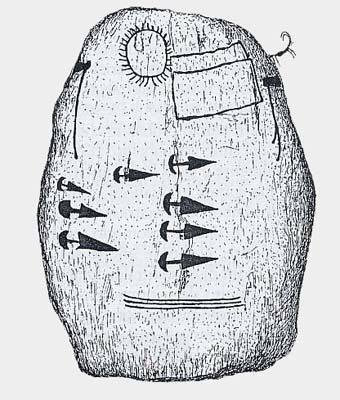
Bagnolo stele 1

== Bagnolo 1 ==
Bagnolo 1 was discovered in 1963, bearing depictions of 14 items, engraved by hammering. Recognizable are drawings of a Sun, an axe and several daggers of the "Remedello" type, a belt and an ibex.

== Bagnolo 2 ==
In 1972, Bagnolo 2 was discovered, a similar stele with 16 engravings, showing the same daggers and axes, and a Sun, as well as a figure of a dog, and a ploughman with a team of two oxen, and patterns interpreted as necklaces and pendants. Bagnolo 2 was found incorporated in a historic structure.

== Fragments of other engravings in the area ==
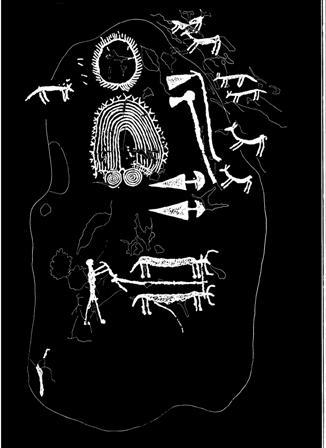
Bagnlo stele 2

Fragments of other engraving were found in nearby Ossimo and Borno.

== Dating ==
From the style of the daggers depicted, the engravings have been dated to the Italian Chalcolithic, early to mid 3rd millennium BC, probably predating the presence of Indo-Europeans on the peninsula.

== See also ==
- Rock Drawings in Valcamonica
- Petroglyph
- Kurgan stelae
