= Bishigram Valley =

Valley in Swat District, Pakistan

Bishigram (Urdu: بیشیگرام) valley is located in the Swat District of Khyber Pakhtunkhwa, Pakistan.

The valley is home to the last native-speakers of the near-extinct Badeshi language.
