= Soandos =

Town of ancient Cappadocia

Coordinates: 38°20′39″N 34°52′44″E

Soandos (Ancient Greek: Σόανδος) was a town of ancient Cappadocia, inhabited during Roman and Byzantine times.

Its site is located near Soğanlı, Asiatic Turkey.
