= Abistamenes =

4th-century BC satrap of Cappadocia

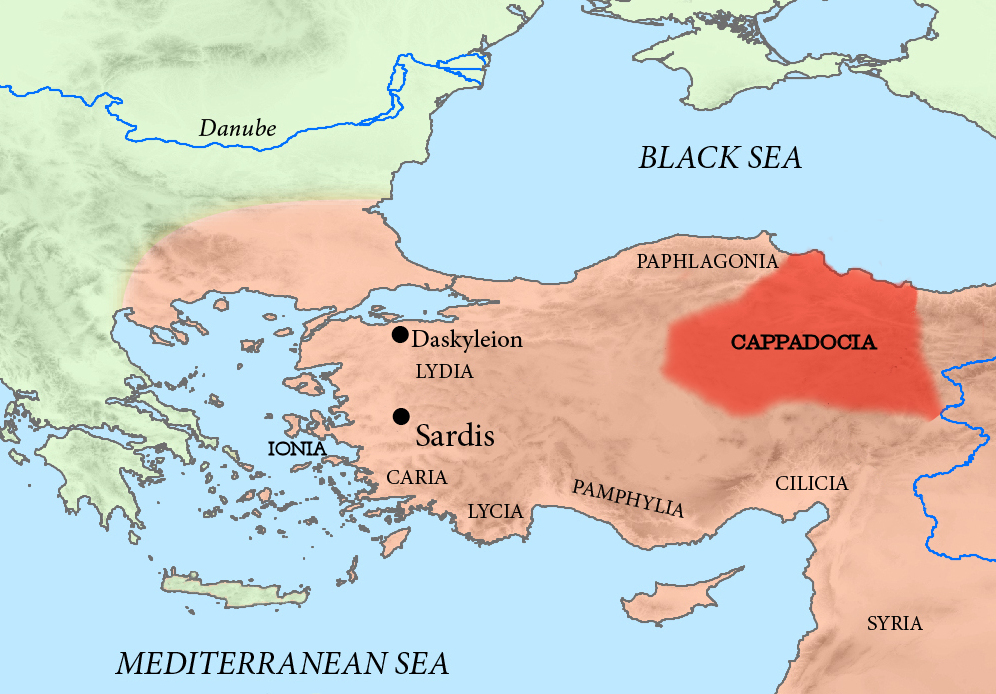
Abistamenes was Hellenistic satrap of Cappadocia.

Abistamenes (fl. 4th century BC) was a governor, or satrap, of Cappadocia, or at least of its southern portions, with Ariarathes I of Cappadocia possibly governing the north. He is called Sabictas by Arrian, and was almost certainly a native Cappadocian.

Abistamenes was the successor to Mithrobuzanes, the last Achaemenid satrap of Cappadocia. Mithrobouzanes was killed at the Battle of the Granicus in 334 BC, and Abistamenes was thereafter appointed satrap by Alexander the Great, although his hold over Cappadocia appears to have been weak, as Cappadocian soldiers were found fighting for King Darius III of Persia during the Battle of Gaugamela in 331 BC. Abistamenes may no longer even have been in power at that point, however, as he seems to disappear from the historical record in the wake of the Battle of Issus in 333 BC.

Abistamenes' rule had certainly ended by the time of Alexander's death in 323 BC, when all of Cappadocia was given by Alexander's heirs to Eumenes to govern.
