= Dasmenda =

Town of ancient Cappadocia

Coordinates: 38°06′10″N 34°43′33″E

Dasmenda (Ancient Greek: Δασμένδα), possibly also known as Dasmendron, was a town of ancient Cappadocia, inhabited through Roman and Byzantine times.

Strabo calls it a stronghold with sheer ascent.

Its site is located near Ovacık, Asiatic Turkey.
