= Mithrobuzanes =

Persian governor of Cappadocia (died 334 BC)

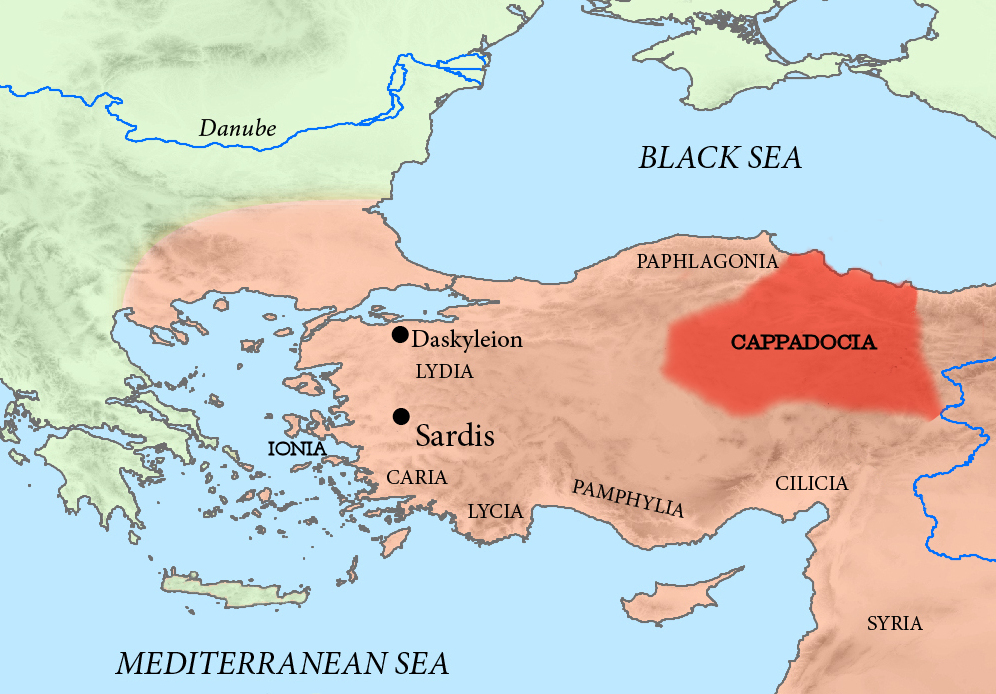
Mithrobuzanes was satrap of Achaemenid Cappadocia.

Mithrobuzanes (Old Persian: *Miθrabaujanaʰ; Ancient Greek: Μιθροβουζάνης Mithrobouzánēs; d. 334 BC) was a Persian governor (satrap) of Cappadocia in the 4th century BC, during the reign of Darius III. He was probably a son of Ariarathes. As a Persian military commander he was killed at the Battle of Granicus fighting Alexander the Great.

The victorious Alexander appointed Abistamenes in his place.

== Sources ==
- Heckel, Waldemar (2006). Who's Who in the Age of Alexander the Great: Prosopography of Alexander's Empire. Blackwell Publishing.
