= Cappadocian calendar =

Solar calendar that was derived from the Persian Zoroastrian calendar

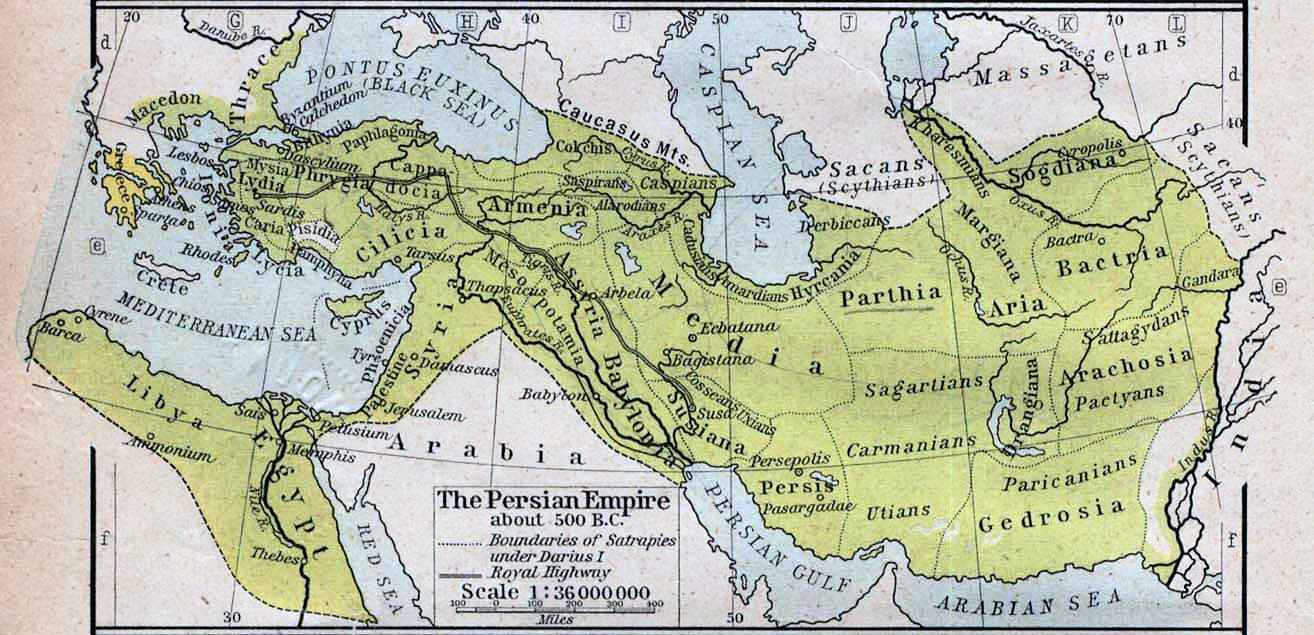
Map depicting the Achaemenid Empire in c. 500 BC, by William Robert Shepherd (1923)

The Cappadocian calendar was a solar calendar derived from the Persian Zoroastrian calendar. It is named after the historic region of Cappadocia in present-day Turkey, where it was used. The calendar, which had 12 months of 30 days each and five epagomenal days, originated between 550 and 330 BC, when Cappadocia was part of the Persian Achaemenid Empire. The Cappadocian calendar was identical to the Zoroastrian calendar; this can be seen in its structure, the Avestan names and the order of the months. The Cappadocian calendar reflects the influence of Iranian culture in the region. Extant evidence of the calendar dates back to Late Antiquity through the accounts of Greek astronomers, by which time it had already been adapted to the Julian calendar.

== Context ==
The Cappadocian calendar was evidently devised when Cappadocia, a historical region in present-day Turkey, was a province (satrapy) of the Achaemenid Empire. The calendar is named after the region it was used in; there is no consensus about its precise starting date. According to the historian Josef Marquart, the calendar commenced in 490 BC, whereas according to the philologist Jacques Duchesne-Guillemin, it began between 490 and 480 BC. It is a solar calendar with 360 days divided into 12 months, which were followed by five epagomenal days.

The calendar effectively imitated the Zoroastrian one; because the Persians were the dominant political group in Cappadocia then, it became the region's main calendar and survived as such in the Kingdom of Cappadocia. Although the passage of time and local dialect differences resulted in minor differences in spelling, the names of the months of the Cappadocian calendar are almost identical to those of the Zoroastrian (Avestan) calendar. The Persians in Cappadocia spoke western Iranian; therefore, the Cappadocian month-names are in some aspects linguistically closer to Middle Persian (Pahlavi) spelling rather than Avestan spelling. The Cappadocian forms, however, are more archaic and are closer in this regard to the Avestan forms.

The Cappadocian calendar is evidence of the long-lasting Iranian cultural and religious influences on Cappadocia. According to the Iranologist Mary Boyce, the Cappadocian calendar, together with the Middle Persian, Parthian, Sogdian, Khwarazmian, Bactrian, and Old Armenian calendars, were all derived from the Achaemenian state calendar that the Persians had introduced in the early Achaemenid period to establish the "accepted means of time-reckoning for all their Zoroastrian subjects". Over time, local language changes resulted in different local versions. Other than that, these calendars are almost identical. The Cappadocian calendar survived through the texts of Greek astronomers of Late Antiquity and was still known as late as the 4th century AD.

== Names of the months ==
Months	Cappadocian	Young Avestan	Early Middle Persian	Middle Persian proper (Pahlavi)	New Persian
1	[Ar]artana (Note: The Cappadocian term relating to the "fravashis of the ashavans", i.e., Fravašinąm (Younger Avestan), Fravartīn (Early Middle Persian), Frawardīn (Middle Persian proper, Pahlavi) and Farvardīn (New Persian).)	Fravašinąm	Fravartīn	Frawardīn	Farvardīn
2	Artegeste (Artēye<s>tē)	Ašahe vahištahe	Artvahišt	Ardwahišt	Ordībehešt
3	Aratata	Haurvatātō	Harvatāt	Xordā̌d	Ḵordad
4	Teiri (Teirei)	Tištryahe	Tīr	Tīr	Tīr
5	Amartata	Amərətātō	Amurtāt	Amurdā̌d	Mordād
6	Sathriore (Xathriorē)	Khšathrahe vairyehe	Šahrevar	Šahrewar	Šahrīvar
7	Mithre (Mithpē)	Mithrahe	Mihr	Mihr	Mehr
8	*Apomenapa	Āpa̧m	Āpān	Ābān	Ābān
9	Athra	Āthrō	Atur	Ādur	Āḏar
10	Dathusa (Dathousa)	Dathušō	Dadv	Day	Dey
11	Osmana (Note: The Cappadocian rendering of Vohu Manah, i.e., Vaŋhə̄uš manaŋhō (Younger Avestan), Vahuman (Early Middle Persian), Wahman (Middle Persian proper, Pahlavi) and Bahman (New Persian).)	Vaŋhə̄uš manaŋhō	Vahuman	Wahman	Bahman
12	Sondara (Sondara<mat?>)	Spəntayå ārmatōiš	Spendārmat	Spandarmad	Esfand

According to Boyce and the historian Frantz Grenet, the "exactness in the main of the correspondences between the calendars" shows that the uses adopted by the Zoroastrians in Cappadocia were "largely uniform". They add that the only divergences lay in the substitution of Teiri (Teirei) for Avestan Tištrya, a change reportedly widespread in many Zoroastrian communities, and the "dedication of the eighth month" to Apąm Napāt ("son of the waters") rather than to Apąm ("waters"), here being Varuna. Boyce and Grenet wrote that this "month-dedication" was unique to the Cappadocian calendar, meaning there may have been controversy among the Zoroastrians in Cappadocia regarding the elevation of Anahita over Varuna. Boyce and Grenet add that this phenomenon shows that even under the strong polity created by the Achaemenids in a region known for its strong Persian religious influences, the local Persian priests held some minor priestly autonomy.

== Adaptation to the Julian calendar ==
Although the Cappadocian calendar originated during the Achaemenid period, extant evidence only dates back to Late Antiquity, when it had already been adapted to the Julian calendar. The historian Sacha Stern stated that the Cappadocian calendar may have been adapted to the Julian calendar in 44 BC. It was probably the first calendar in the Roman East to become "Julianized," (Note: For the Cappadocian calendar, this involved the addition of an extra epagomenal day in Julian leap years.) even before the Egyptian calendar. Even after the "Julianization" of the calendar in the Roman period, however, the date of the Cappadocian New Year was still "approximately compatible with an originally Persian Zoroastrian calendar," and its structure was still based on the original Persian calendar of 12 months of 30 days followed by five epagomenal days.

== Sources ==
- Boyce, Mary; Grenet, Frantz (1991). Beck, Roger (ed.). A History of Zoroastrianism, Zoroastrianism under Macedonian and Roman Rule. Brill. ISBN 978-9004293915.
- Boyce, Mary (2001). Zoroastrians: Their Religious Beliefs and Practices. Psychology Press. ISBN 978-0415239028.
- Boyce, Mary (2009). "NOWRUZ i. In the Pre-Islamic Period". In Yarshater, Ehsan (ed.). Encyclopædia Iranica (Online ed.). Encyclopædia Iranica Foundation.
- de Jong, Albert (1997). Traditions of the Magi: Zoroastrianism in Greek and Latin Literature. Brill. ISBN 978-9004108448.
- Panaino, Antonio; Abdollahy, Reza; Balland, Daniel (1990). "CALENDARS". In Yarshater, Ehsan (ed.). Encyclopædia Iranica. Vol. IV: Bāyju–Carpets XIV. London and New York: Routledge & Kegan Paul. pp. 658–677. ISBN 978-0-71009-132-1.
- Skjærvø, Prods Oktor (2018). "festivals and calendars, Persian and Zoroastrian". In Nicholson, Oliver (ed.). The Oxford Dictionary of Late Antiquity. Oxford: Oxford University Press. ISBN 978-0-19-866277-8.
- Rose, Jenny (2011). Zoroastrianism: An Introduction. I.B.Tauris. ISBN 978-0857719713.
- Stern, Sacha (2012). Calendars in Antiquity: Empires, States, and Societies. Oxford University Press. ISBN 978-0199589449.
- Weiskopf, Michael (1990). "CAPPADOCIA". In Yarshater, Ehsan (ed.). Encyclopædia Iranica. Vol. IV: Bāyju–Carpets XIV. London and New York: Routledge & Kegan Paul. pp. 780–786. ISBN 978-0-71009-132-1.
