= Cappadocia (satrapy) =

Province of the Achaemenid Persian Empire

Achaemenid Cappadocia

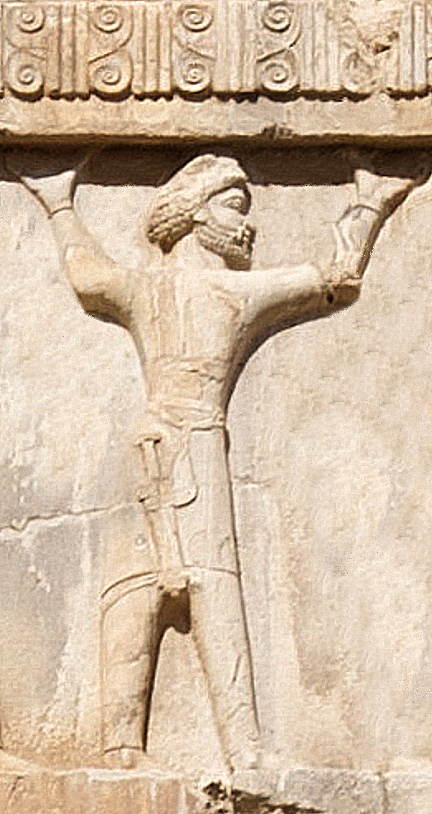
Cappadocian soldier of the Achaemenid army circa 470 BCE. Xerxes I tomb relief.

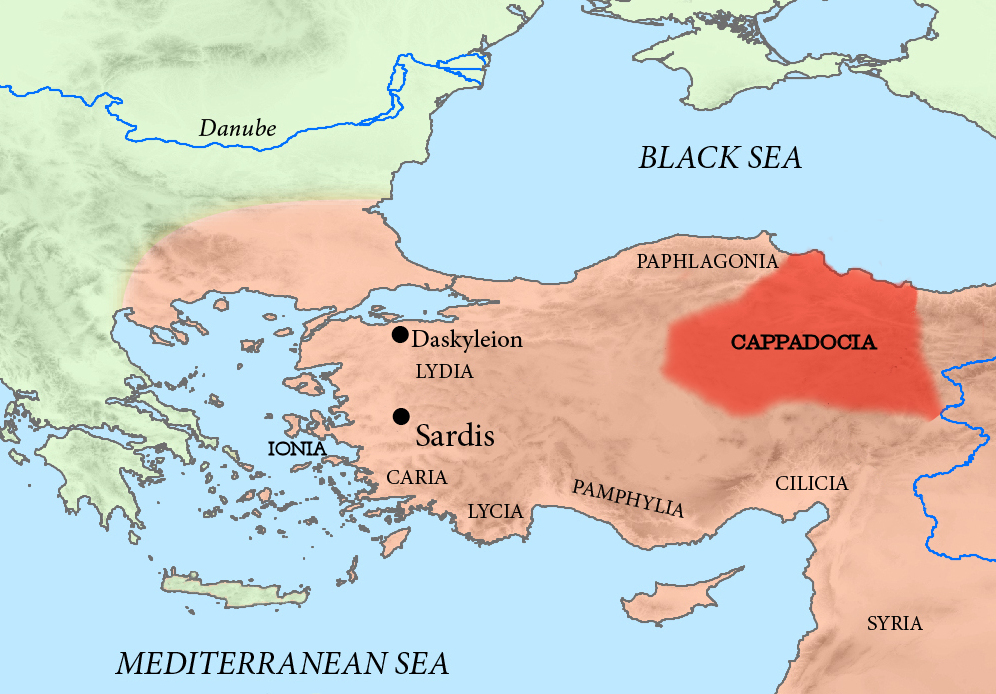
Achaemenid Cappadocia

Cappadocia (from Old Persian 𐎣𐎫𐎱𐎬𐎢𐎣 Katpatuka) was a satrapy (province) of the Achaemenid Empire located in Anatolia (modern-day Turkey). It was used by the Achaemenids to administer the regions beyond the Taurus Mountains and the Euphrates river.

== The Satrapy ==
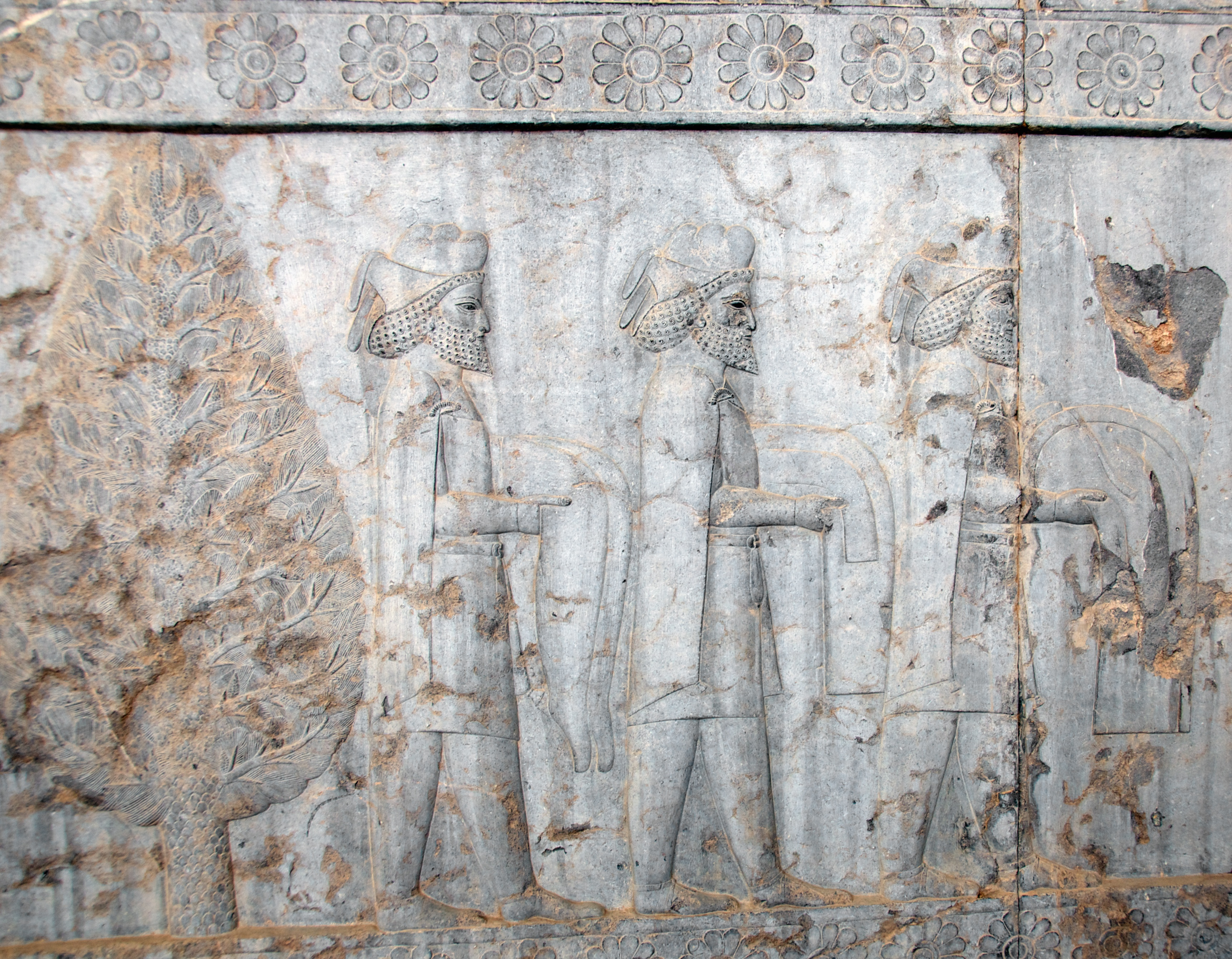
Cappadocian delegation, relief from Apadana of Persepolis

The Satrapy belonged to the third tax district and paid an estimated 360 talents a year in tribute. The first satrap (governor) known by name is Ariaramnes, who ruled sometime at the beginning of the reign of the Achaemenid king Darius the Great. His successors are unknown, although Gobryas, the half brother of Xerxes, commanded the Cappadocians in 480 BCE. During the reign of Artaxerxes II, Cappadocia was divided, becoming Paphlagonia and Cappadocia Proper. Datames (abridged from Datamithra) then became the satrap of southern Cappadocia; he led a revolt and was later assassinated in 362 BCE. The last Achaemenid satrap of Cappadocia was Mithrobuzanes, who died in 334 BCE at the Battle of the Granicus fighting Alexander's invading army.

== Satraps of Cappadocia (c. 380–331 BC) ==
- Ariaramnes, c.500 BCE
- Datames, c. 380–362 BC
- Ariamnes I, 362–350 BC
- Mithrobuzanes (died 334)
- Ariarathes I, 350–331 BC

== See also ==
- Cappadocian calendar
- List of rulers of Cappadocia
- Kingdom of Cappadocia
- Cappadocia
