= Jamal al-Din al-Afghani =

Political activist and Islamic ideologist (1838/1839–1897)

Jamal al-Din al-Afghani جمال‌‌‌ الدین افغانی
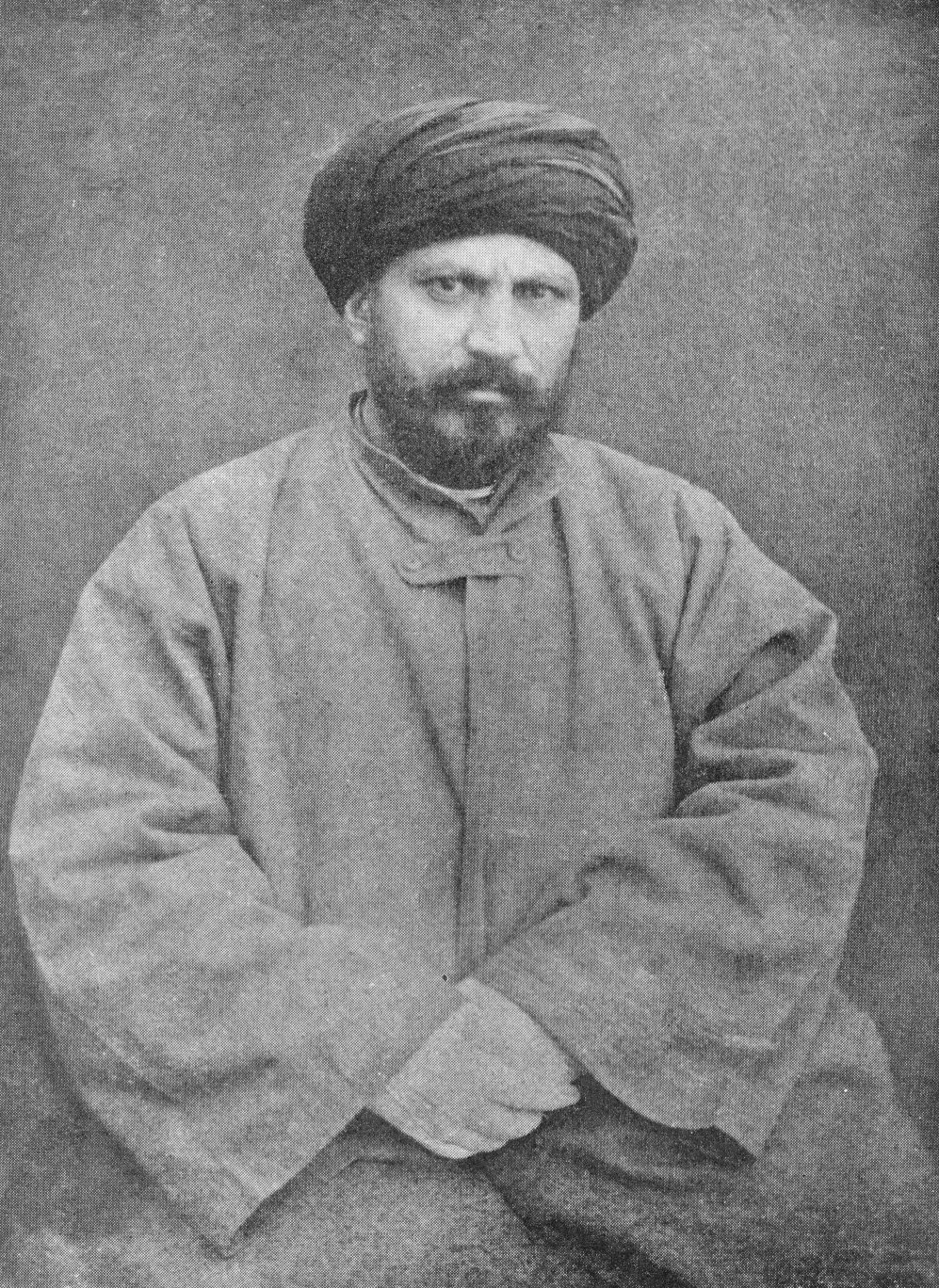

Personal life
- Born: Sayyid Jamaluddin ibn Safdar; 1839 Kunar, Durrani Afghanistan or Hamadan, Guarded Domains of Iran
- Died: 9 March 1897 (aged 58) Constantinople, Ottoman Empire
- Cause of death: Oral cancer
- Resting place: Kabul, Afghanistan
- Notable idea(s): Pan-Islamism ^{α}, Sunni-Shia unity, against the British

Religious life
- Religion: Islam
- Creed: Disputed
- Movement: Modernism; Pan-Islamism; Neo-Sufism; Islamism

Muslim leader
- Influenced by: Alpharabius, Avicenna, Averroes, Avempace, Suhrawardi, Nasir al-Din al-Tusi, Mir Damad, Mulla Sadra
- Influenced: Muhammad Abduh, Rashid Rida, Maulana Azad, Saad Zaghloul, Mirza Reza Kermani

Sayyid Jamāl al-Dīn al-Afghānī (Persian/Pashto: سید جمال‌‌‌ الدین افغانی), also known as Jamāl ad-Dīn Asadābādī (Persian/Pashto: سید جمال‌‌‌الدین اسد‌آبادی) and commonly known as Al-Afghani (1838/1839 – 9 March 1897), was a political activist and Islamic ideologist who travelled throughout the Muslim world during the late 19th century. He is one of the founders of Islamic Modernism as well as an advocate of Pan-Islamic unity in India against the British.

He has been described as having been less interested in minor differences in Islamic jurisprudence than he was in organizing a united response to Western pressure. He is also known for his involvement with his follower Mirza Reza Kermani in the successful plot to assassinate Shah Naser-al-Din, whom Afghani considered to be making too many concessions to foreign powers, especially the British Empire.

== Early life and origin ==
As indicated by his nisba, al-Afghani claimed to be of Afghan origin. His true national and sectarian background has been a subject of controversy. According to one theory and his own account, he was born in Asadabad, Afghanistan, near Kabul. Another theory, championed by Nikki Keddie and accepted by several modern scholars, holds that he was born and raised in a Shia family in Asadabad, Iran near Hamadan. Supporters of the latter theory view his claim to an Afghan origin as motivated by a desire to gain influence among Sunni Muslims or escape oppression by the Iranian emperor Naser al-Din Shah Qajar. One of his main rivals, was Shaykh Yusuf al-Nabhani and another was Shaykh Abu al-Huda al-Sayyadi, who called him Mutaʾafghin ("the one who claims to be Afghan") and tried to expose his Twelver Shi'a roots. Keddie also asserts that al-Afghani practiced taqiyya, which was more prevalent in the Twelver world.

He was educated first at home and then taken by his father for further education to Qazvin, to Tehran, and finally, while he was still a youth, to the Twelver shrine cities in Ottoman Iraq. It is thought that followers of the Twelver revivalist Shaykh Ahmad influenced him. Other names adopted by al-Afghani were al-Kābulī ("[the one] from Kabul") Asadābādī, Sadat-e Kunar ("Sayyids of Kunar") and Hussain. Especially in writings published in Afghanistan, he also used the pseudonym al-Rūmī "the Anatolian".

== Political activism ==
At the age of 17 or 18 in 1856–57, Al-Afghani traveled to British India and spent several years there studying religions. In 1859, a British spy reported that Al-Afghani was a possible Russian agent. The British representatives reported that he wore the traditional clothes of the Nogais of Central Asia and spoke Persian, Arabic and Turkish fluently.

After this first Indian tour, he decided to perform the Hajj. His first documents are dated from Fall 1865, where he mentions leaving the "revered place" (makān-i Musharraf) and arriving in Tehran around mid-December of the same year. In the spring of 1866, he left Iran for Afghanistan, passing through Mashhad and Herat.

After the Indian stay, all sources have Afghānī next take a leisurely trip to Mecca, stopping at several points along the way. Both the standard biography and Lutfallāh's account take Afghānī's word that he entered Afghan government service before 1863, but since documents from Afghanistan show that he arrived there only in 1866, we are left with several years unaccounted for. The most probable supposition seems to be that he may have spent longer in India than he later said and that after going to Mecca he traveled elsewhere in the Ottoman Empire. When he arrived in Afghanistan in 1866 he claimed to be from Constantinople, and he might not have made this claim if he had never even seen the city, and could be caught in ignorance of it.

— Nikki Keddie, 1983

He was spotted in Afghanistan in 1866 and spent time in Kandahar, Ghazni, and Kabul.

Reports from the colonial British Indian and Afghan government stated that he was a stranger in Afghanistan and spoke Iranian Persian, following a European lifestyle and not observing Muslim practices, including Ramadan. He became counselor to Mohammad Afzal Khan, the eldest son of the former emir, Dost Mohammad Khan, during his war against his half-brother Sher Ali Khan. He encouraged Muhammad Afzal to turn away from his father's British-aligned policy and turn to the Russian Empire for support. In 1868, Sher Ali Khan prevailed against Muhammad Afzal and expelled al-Afghani from the country.

Al-Afghani traveled to Istanbul, passing through India and Cairo on his way there. He stayed in Cairo long enough to meet a young student who would become a devoted disciple of his, Muhammad Abduh. Once in Istanbul, he met with Grand Vizier Mehmed Emin Âli Pasha and secured an appointment to the Council of Education. He spoke at the opening of Istanbul University, giving a speech typifying the Modernist spirit animating the ongoing Tanzimat.

Are we not going to take an example from the civilized nations? Let us cast a glance at the achievement of others. By effort, they have achieved the final degree of knowledge and the peak of elevation. For us too all the means are ready, and there remains no obstacle to our progress. Only laziness, stupidity, and ignorance are obstacles to [our] advance.

However, conservative clerics found his views too radical. The university was closed in 1871 and al-Afghani was expelled. He then moved to the Khedivate of Egypt and began preaching his ideas of political reform. The Egyptian government originally gave him a stipend, but due to his public attacks on France and England, he was exiled to India in August 1879, where he stayed in Hyderabad and Calcutta. He then traveled to Istanbul, London, Paris, Moscow, Saint Petersburg, and Munich.

While in Egypt, Afghani sought the removal of the ruling regime of Isma'il Pasha of Egypt, which he viewed as pro-British, and used Freemasonry as an organizational base for his political activities. During this period, Afghani had also considered assassinating Khedive Isma'il. He perceived Freemasonry as a means of advancing his anti-colonial, anti-imperialist, pan-Islamic causes. Afghani's political activities would play a decisive role in overthrowing Isma'il from the throne and bringing Tewfik Pasha as Khedive.

However, local Masons asserted that they were not interested in politics and sought reconciliation with the British Empire. When Afghani was warned that the lodge was not a political platform, he replied, "I have seen a lot of odd things in this country [Egypt], but I would never have thought that cowardice would infiltrate the ranks of masonry to such an extent." Around 1875 or 1876, an incident wherein Masons lavishly praised a British imperial visitor was a major reason for Afghani's quitting of Freemasonry. After realizing the indifference of the Masons and their political subservience to the British Empire, Afghani eventually left Freemasonry.

In 1884, he began publishing an Arabic newspaper in Paris entitled al-Urwah al-Wuthqa (Arabic: العروة الوثقى, lit. 'The Indissoluble Link') with Muhammad Abduh; the title is taken from Quran 2:256. The newspaper called for a return to the original principles and ideals of Islam, and greater unity among Islamic peoples. He argued that this would allow the Islamic community to regain its former strength against European powers.

When al-Afgani was visiting Bushehr in southern Iran in the spring of 1886, planning to pick up books he had shipped there and carry on to Russia, he fell ill. He was invited by Naser al-Din Shah Qajar's Minister of Press and Publications to come to Tehran, but fell from favor quite quickly. The Emperor ordered him to be taken to Russia, where al-Afghani spent 1887 to 1889.

From Russia, he traveled to Munich, returning to Iran in late 1889. Due to his political activities, the Shah planned to expel him from Iran, but al-Afghani found out and took sanctuary in the Shah Abdol-Azim Shrine near Tehran. After seven months of preaching to admirers from the shrine, he was arrested in 1891, transported to the border with Ottoman Iraq and expelled from Iran. Although Al-Afghani quarreled with most of his patrons, it is said he "reserved his strongest hatred for the Shah," whom he accused of weakening Islam by granting concessions to Europeans and squandering the money earned thereby. His agitation against the Shah is thought to have been one of the "fountain-heads" of the successful 1891 Tobacco Protest against the grant of a tobacco monopoly to a British company, and the later 1905 Constitutional Revolution.

After Iraq, he went to England in 1891 and 1892. He was later invited by a member of Sultan Abdul Hamid II's court in 1892 to Istanbul. He traveled there with diplomatic immunity from the British Embassy, which raised many eyebrows, but was granted a house and salary by the Sultan. Abdul Hamid II aimed to use al-Afghani for Pan-Islamist propagation.

While in Istanbul in 1895, al-Afghani was visited by a Persian ex-prisoner, Mirza Reza Kermani, who had been his servant and disciple, and together they planned the assassination of Emperor Naser al-Din of Iran. They both collaborated with Mirza Malkam Khan, the former Qajar envoy to London, in his London-based paper Qanun to attack Qajar rule. Kermani later returned to Iran and shot and killed Emperor Naser al-Din on 1 May 1896 while the Emperor was visiting the same shrine al-Afghani had once taken refuge in. Kermani was executed by public hanging in August 1897, but the Iranian government was not successful in extraditing al-Afghani from Turkey. Al-Afghani himself died of cancer the same year a few months before Kermani's hanging.

== Political and religious views ==
Al-Afghani's ideology has been described as a welding of "traditional" religious antipathy toward non-Muslims "to a modern critique of Western imperialism and an appeal for the unity of Islam", urging the adoption of Western sciences and institutions that might strengthen Islam. According to Muhammad Abduh, Al-Afghani's main struggle in life was to decrease British domination of eastern nations and to minimize its power over Muslims.

Al-Afghani's friend, the British poet, and Arabophile Wilfrid Scawen Blunt, considered him a liberal, and in some of his writings he equates the parliamentary system to the shura (consultation) system mentioned in the Qur'an. However, his attitude to the constitutional government was ambiguous because he doubted that it was viable in the Islamic world. According to his biographer, he envisioned instead "the overthrow of individual rulers who were lax or subservient to foreigners and their replacement by strong and patriotic men."

Blunt, Jane Digby and Richard Francis Burton, were close with Emir Abdelkader (1808–1883), an Algerian Islamic scholar, Sufi, and military leader. In 1864, the Lodge "Henry IV" extended an invitation to him to join Freemasonry, which he accepted, being initiated at the Lodge of the Pyramids in Alexandria, Egypt. Blunt had supposedly become a convert to Islam under the influence of al-Afghani and shared his hopes of establishing an Arab Caliphate based in Mecca to replace the Ottoman Sultan in Istanbul. When Blunt visited Abdelkader in 1881, he decided that he was the most promising candidate for caliph, an opinion shared by Afghani and his disciple, Muhammad Abduh.

According to another source Al-Afghani was greatly disappointed by the failure of the Indian Rebellion of 1857 and came to three principal conclusions from it:

- that European imperialism, having conquered India, now threatened the Middle East.
- that Asia, including the Middle East, could prevent the onslaught of Western powers only by immediately adopting modern technology like the West.
- that Islam, despite its traditionalism, was an effective creed for mobilizing the public against the imperialists.

Al-Afghani held that Hindus and Muslims should work together to overthrow British rule in India, a view rehashed by Hussain Ahmad Madani in Composite Nationalism and Islam five decades later.

He believed that Islam and its revealed law were compatible with rationality and, thus, Muslims could become politically unified while still maintaining their faith based on religious social morality. These beliefs had a profound effect on Muhammad Abduh, who went on to expand on the notion of Mu'amalat, using rationality in the human relations aspect of Islam.

In 1881 he published a collection of polemics titled Al-Radd ʻalā al-dahrīyīn "Refutation of the Materialists", agitating for pan-Islamic unity against Western imperialism. It included one of the earliest pieces of Islamic thought arguing against Charles Darwin's then-recent On the Origin of Species; however, his arguments allegedly incorrectly caricatured evolutionary biology, provoking criticism that he had not read Darwin's writings. In his later work Khatirat Jamal ad-Din al-Afghani "The memoir of Al-Afghani", he accepted the validity of evolution, asserting that the Islamic world had already known and used it. Although he accepted abiogenesis and the evolution of animals, he rejected the theory that the human species is the product of evolution, arguing that humans have souls.

Among the reasons why Al-Afghani was thought to have had a less than deep religious faith was his lack of interest in finding theological common ground between the Shia and the Sunni despite his interest in political unity between the two groups. For example, when he moved to Istanbul he disguised his Twelver Shi'i background by labeling himself "the Afghan".

== Death and legacy ==
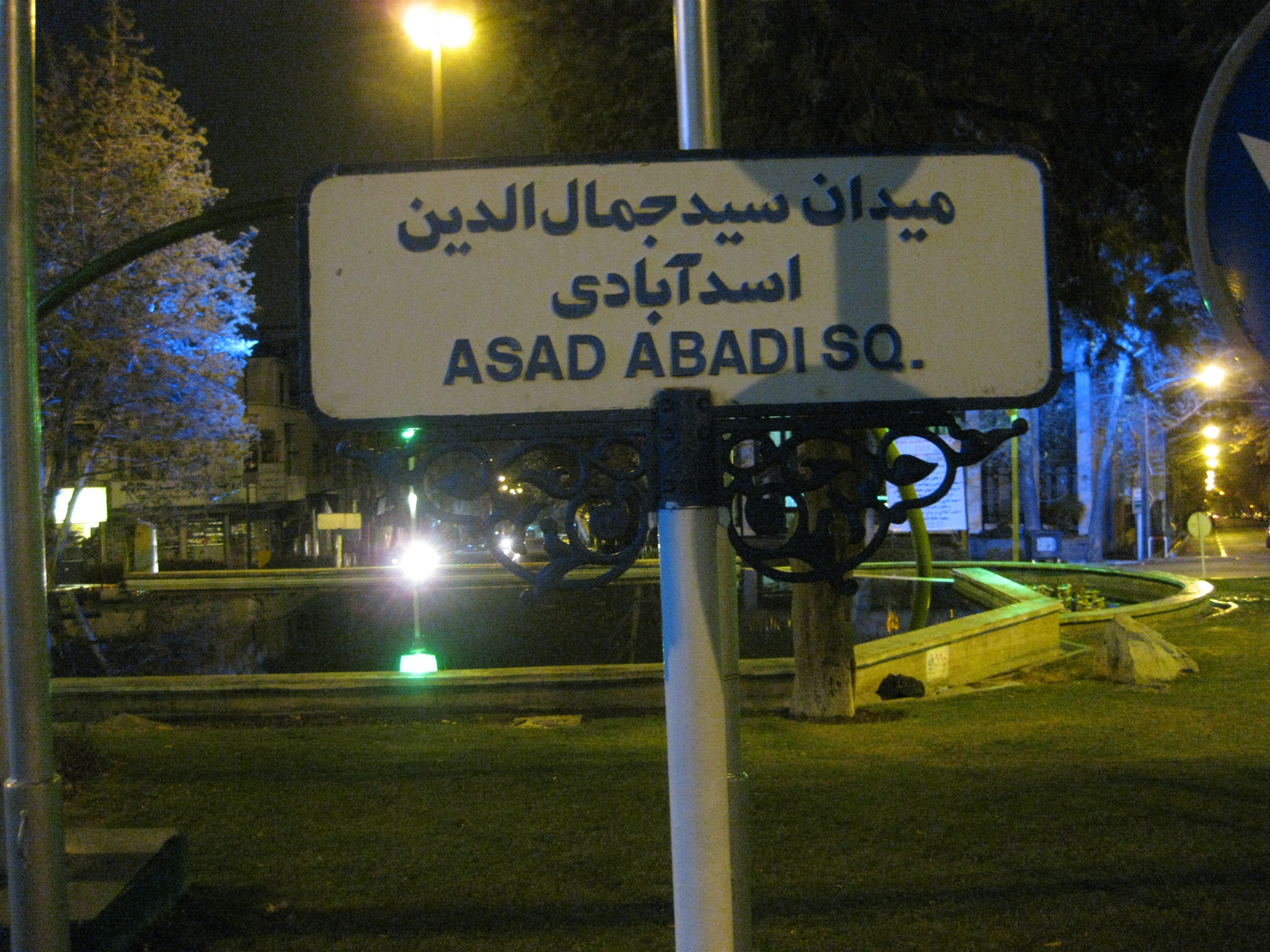
Asad Abadi Square in Tehran, Iran

Al-Afghani died of cancer of the jaw on 9 March 1897 in Istanbul and was buried there. In late 1944, at the request of the Afghan government, his remains were taken to Afghanistan via British India. His funeral was offered in Peshawar's Qissa Khwani Bazaar in front of the Afghan Consulate building. Thereafter, his remains were laid in Kabul inside the Kabul University; a mausoleum was also erected there in his memory. In October 2002, the American Ambassador to Afghanistan, Robert Finn, pledged a donation of $25,000 to restore the mausoleum from damage sustained during the civil war. The repairs were completed in 2010.

In Afghanistan, a university is named after him (Syed Jamaluddin Afghan University) in Kabul. There is also a street in the center of Kabul which is called by the name Afghani. In other parts of Afghanistan, there are many places like hospitals, schools, Madrasas, Parks, and roads named after Jamaluddin Afghan.

In Peshawar, Pakistan there is a road named after him as well.

In Tehran, the capital of Iran, there is a square and a street named after him (Asad Abadi Square and "Asad Abadi Avenue" in Yusef Abad)

=== Theosophy ===
Afghani as Haji Sharif, who inspired Saint-Yves d'Alveydre in legend of Agarttha and Synarchy.

According to K. Paul Johnson, in The Masters Revealed, H.P. Blavatsky's masters were real people, and "Serapis Bey" was Jamal Afghani, as a purported leader of an order named the "Brotherhood of Luxor". Afghani was introduced to the Star of the East Lodge, of which he became the leader, by its founder Raphael Borg, the British consul in Cairo, who was in communication with Blavatsky. Afghani's friend, a Jewish-Italian actor from Cairo named James Sanua, who with his girlfriend Lydia Pashkov and their friend Lady Jane Digby were travel companions of Blavatsky. As concluded by Joscelyn Godwin in The Theosophical Enlightenment, "If we interpret the 'Brotherhood of Luxor' to refer to the coterie of esotericists and magicians that Blavatsky knew and worked with in Egypt, then we should probably count Sanua and Jamal ad-Din as members."

In the early 1860s, he was in Central Asia and the Caucasus when Blavatsky was in Tbilisi. In the late 1860s, he was in Afghanistan until he was expelled and returned to India. He went to Istanbul and was again expelled in 1871 when he proceeded to Cairo, where his circle of disciples was similar to Blavatsky's Brotherhood of Luxor. Afghani was forced to leave Egypt and settled in Hyderabad, India, in 1879, the year the Theosophical Society's founders arrived in Bombay. He then left India and spent a short time in Egypt before arriving in Paris in 1884. The following year he proceeded to London, and then on to Russia where he collaborated with Blavatsky's publisher, Mikhail Katkov.

A photo published by Joscelyn Godwin in The Kingdom of Agarttha, shows Afghani posing in the persona of Haji Sharif, who inspired Saint-Yves d'Alveydre in the legend of Agarttha and synarchy.

== Works ==
- "Sayyid Jamāl-ad-Dīn al-Afghānī:", Continued the statement in the history of Afghans Egypt, original in Arabic: تتمة البيان في تاريخ الأفغان Tatimmat al-bayan fi tarikh al-Afghan, 1901 (Mesr, 1318 Islamic lunar year (calendar)
- Sayyid Jamāl-ad-Dīn al-Afghānī: Brochure about Naturalism or materialism, original in Dari language: رساله نیچریه (Ressalah e Natscheria), translated to Arabic by Muhammad Abduh under the title ar-Rad 'ala Dahriya.

== See also ==
- Tobacco Protest
- Muhammad Bakhit al-Muti'i
- Mustafa Sabri

== Notes ==
^α. Some Western academics point out that the term "Pan-Islamism" never existed before al-Afghani. The Arabic term Ummah, which is found in the Quran, however, was historically used to denote the Muslim nation altogether, surpassing race, ethnicity, etc. and this term has been used in a political sense by classical Islamic scholars e.g. such as al-Mawardi in Al-Ahkam al-Sultaniyyah, where he discusses the contract of Imamate of the Ummah, "prescribed to succeed Prophethood" in the protection of the religion and of managing the affairs of the world.
