= Nangalam =

Town in Afghanistan

- Town
- Location within Afghanistan Location within Asia
- Coordinates: 34.9719°N 70.9082°E
- Country: Afghanistan
- Province: Kunar
- District: Dara-I-Pech
- Time zone: UTC+04:30 (Afghanistan Standard Time)

Nangalam is a town in Pech Valley in Kunar Province of Afghanistan. It is situated at the junction of Pech and Waygal rivers.

== Demographics ==
Most residents of Nangalam today are Safi Pashtuns.

== History ==
Nangalam has been at the center of many conflicts. It was razed by Soviet-backed Afghan forces in 1978.

During the War in Afghanistan, U.S. forces built a military base in Nangalam. After suffering heavy casualties, U.S. troops had to retreat from the base in 2011. Surprisingly, Afghan forces later were successful in bringing peace to the region on their own.

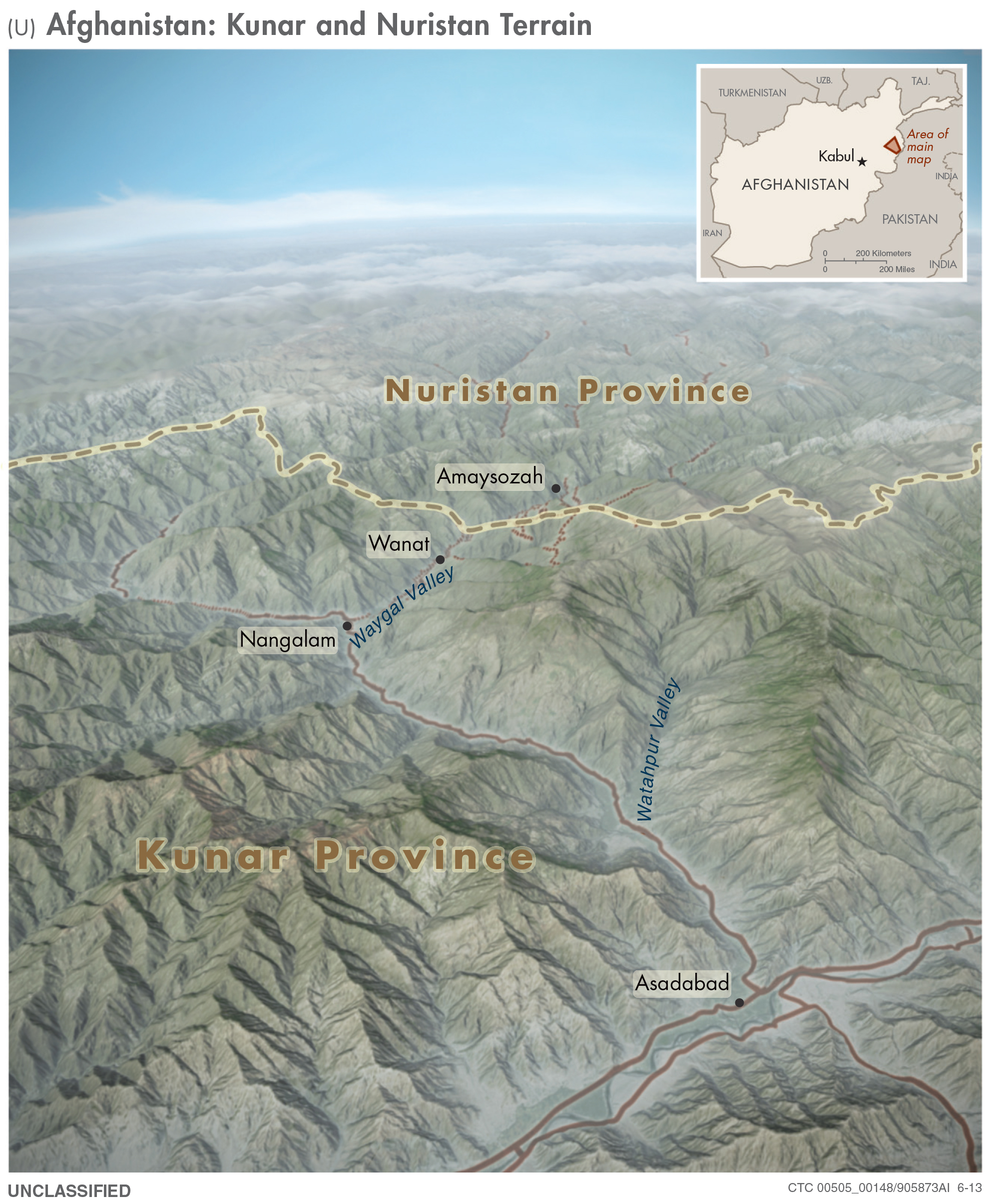
Nangalam's location
