= Pech Valley =

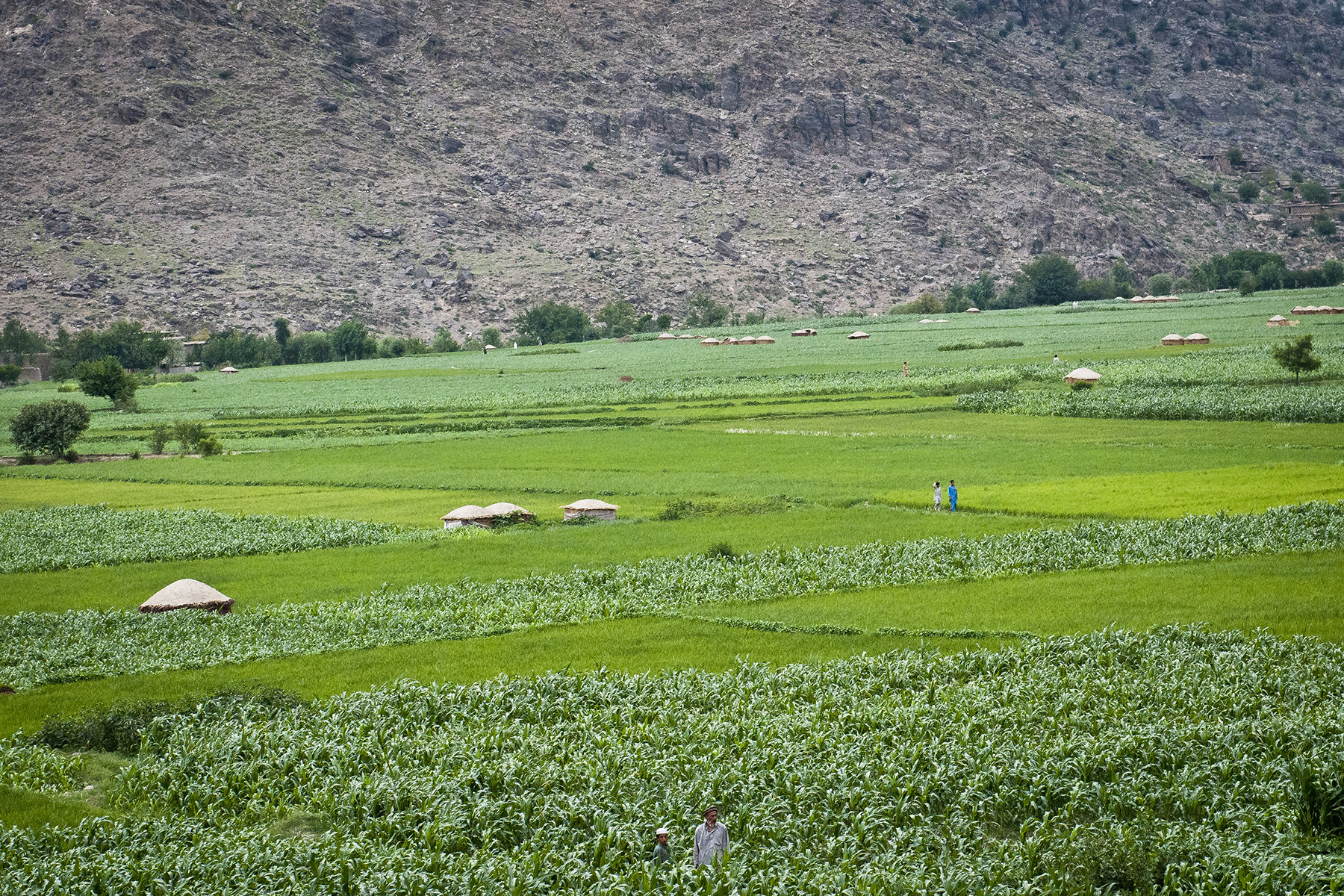
- Country: Afghanistan
- Province: Kunar Province
- District: Pech District
- Demonym: Pashtuns

Languages
  - Official: Pashto & Dari
  - Native: Pashto

Pech Valley (Pashto: پیچ and Dari: پیچ) is a valley in Pech District of Kunar Province, Afghanistan.

== History ==
According to Akhund Darweza, the Pech Valley served as the capital of the Gabari Sultans (later known as Jahangiri Swati Sultans), beginning with Sultan Shamoos and followed by Sultan Jamad, Sultan Jarsan, Sultan Hand, and Sultan Kehjaman Kunari. Sultan Kehjaman Kunari’s son, Sultan Pakhal Kunari, later moved the capital from Pech Valley to Manglawar in Swat, becoming the first sultan of the Sultanate of Swat.

In Past Pech Valley and surrounding Valleys are ruled under Chitrali Mehtar (King) Aman ul-Mulk. He Appointed Hakim Baig of Zundre or Rono Tribe as a Hakim of Chugansuraee Present-day Asadabad. He was killed by Kafirs of Kafiristan and buried in Pech Valley.

== Geography ==
Pech Valley Located in Pech District in Kunar Province of Afghanistan. Where it share its boarder with Lower Chitral District in KPK Province of Pakistan.

== Demographics ==
Pashto is the main language of Pech Valley. Other Languages also spoken by a small population. Pashtuns are the majority ethnic group in Pech Valley.
