= Lawi Hydro Power Project =

- Country: Pakistan
- Location: Khyber Pakhtunkhwa, Pakistan
- Status: Under construction

Lawi Hydro Power Project is an under-construction Hydro Power Project on Shishi River (a tributary of Chitral River) in Khyber Pakhtunkhwa, Pakistan.
