= Dara-I-Pech District =

District of Kunar Province, Afghanistan

Coordinates: 34°57′16″N 70°49′1″E

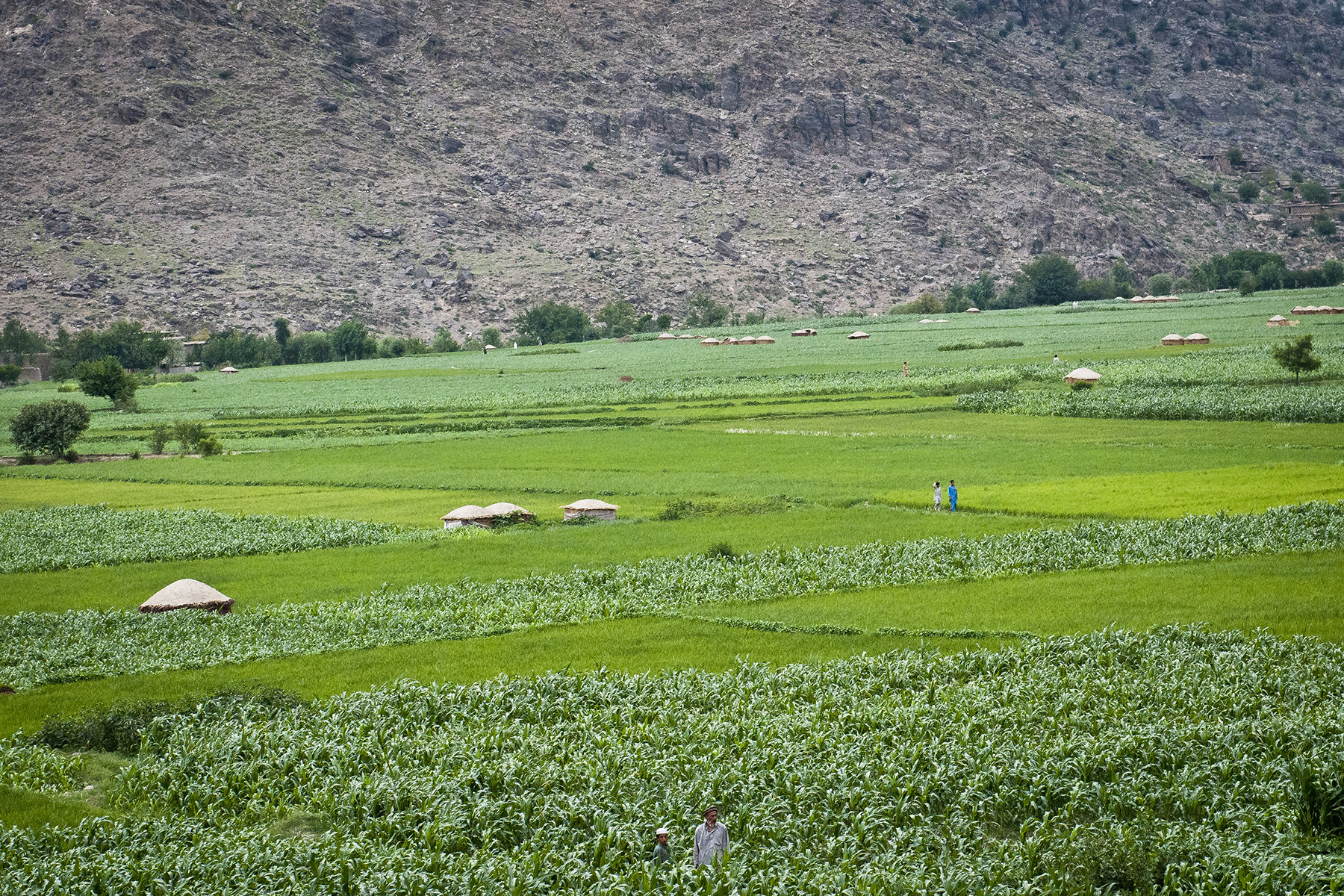
Villagers tend their fields in the Pech River Valley, Kunar Province, Afghanistan

Dara-I-Pech District (Pashto: دره پیچ) (also known as Manogay District or Pech District) is located in western-central Kunar Province, Afghanistan, 30 km west of Asadabad. The population was 48,400 in 2006. The district is governed from Mano Gai. The governor is Mohammad Rahkman.

While the bulk of the population is Safi Pashtun, who are mostly settled along the Pech River, the district also includes the Pashai-speaking Korengalis in the southern portion of the Korengal Valley.

There are several large capillary valleys, such as the Korengal and Shuryak. There are 13 big villages, most of them in the valleys of the mountainous district. There has been a timber market. People are generally poor. Farming and animal husbandry are the main sources of income. Health care and education need improvement.

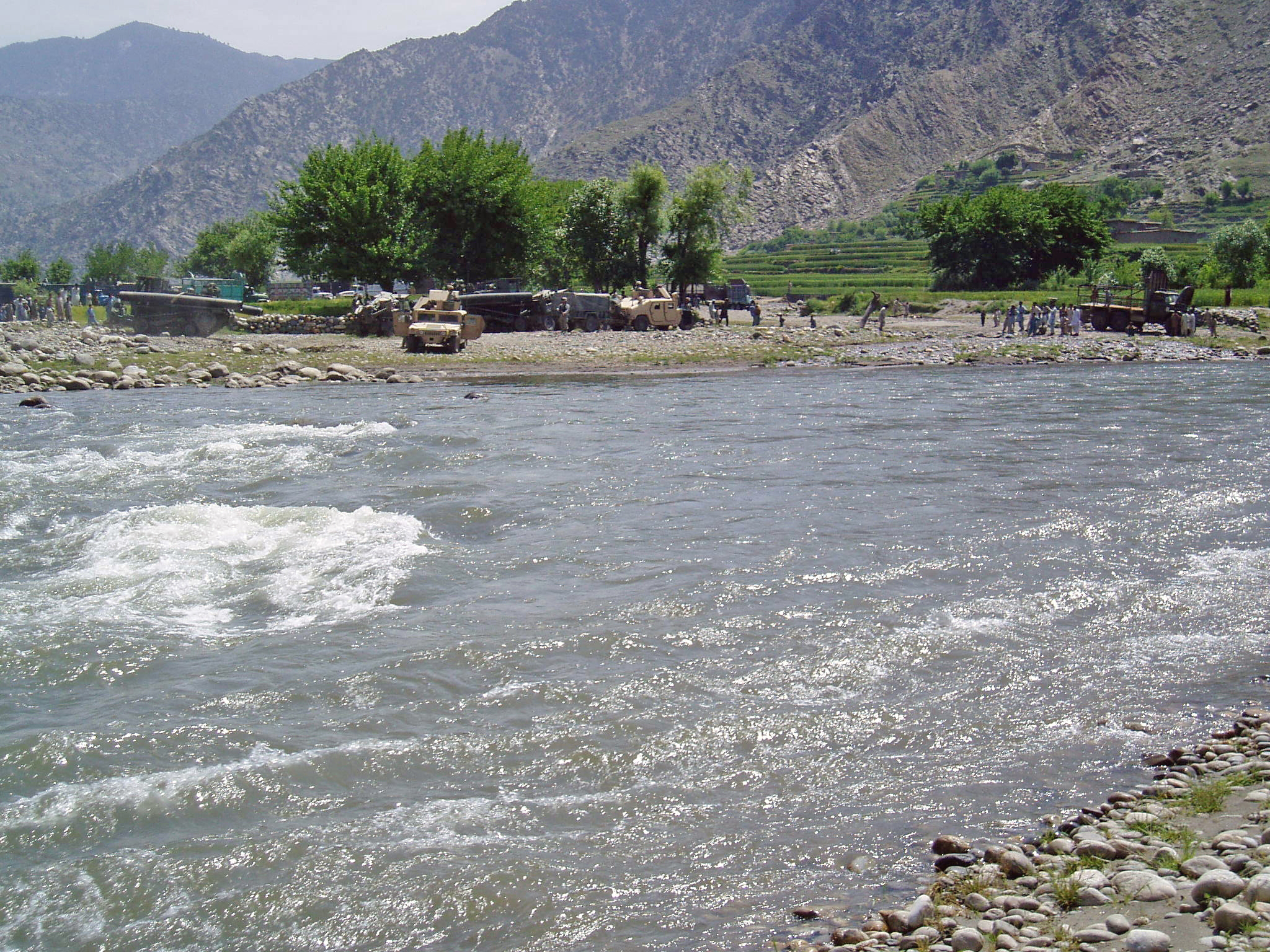
The Pech River flows through the valley.

Nangalam, at the junction of the Pech and Waygal rivers, is the largest town in the district. Formerly inhabited by speakers of a Pech Valley Dardic (Indic) language called Nangalami, the village was destroyed by Afghan troops in 1978. When it was rebuilt, the inhabitants were predominantly Safi Pashtuns. The major coalition base of Camp Blessing is located near Nangalam to the west.

In 1999 the area was affected by extensive fires which burned through thousands of acres of forest in the Dara Pech Valley, displacing some 300 people. The Taliban in power at the time appealed to the UN for assistance.

On 13 November 2003, an explosive device was detonated in a bus in the area, killing four people, two of them children.

The Korengal Valley has been the scene of sustained fighting between U.S. forces and insurgents. The New York Times Magazine ran a story by contributing writer Elizabeth Rubin entitled "Battle Company Is Out There" on February 24, 2008.

The book Siren's Song: The Allure of War by Antonio Salinas was published in 2012. The book depicts the experiences of an American platoon at COP Honaker Miracle in the Dara-I-Pech District.

== See also ==
- Districts of Afghanistan
- Battle of Wanat
- Mano Gai airstrike
