= Mirza Reza Kermani =

Iranian cleric and assassin 1854–1896

- میرزا رضا کرمانی
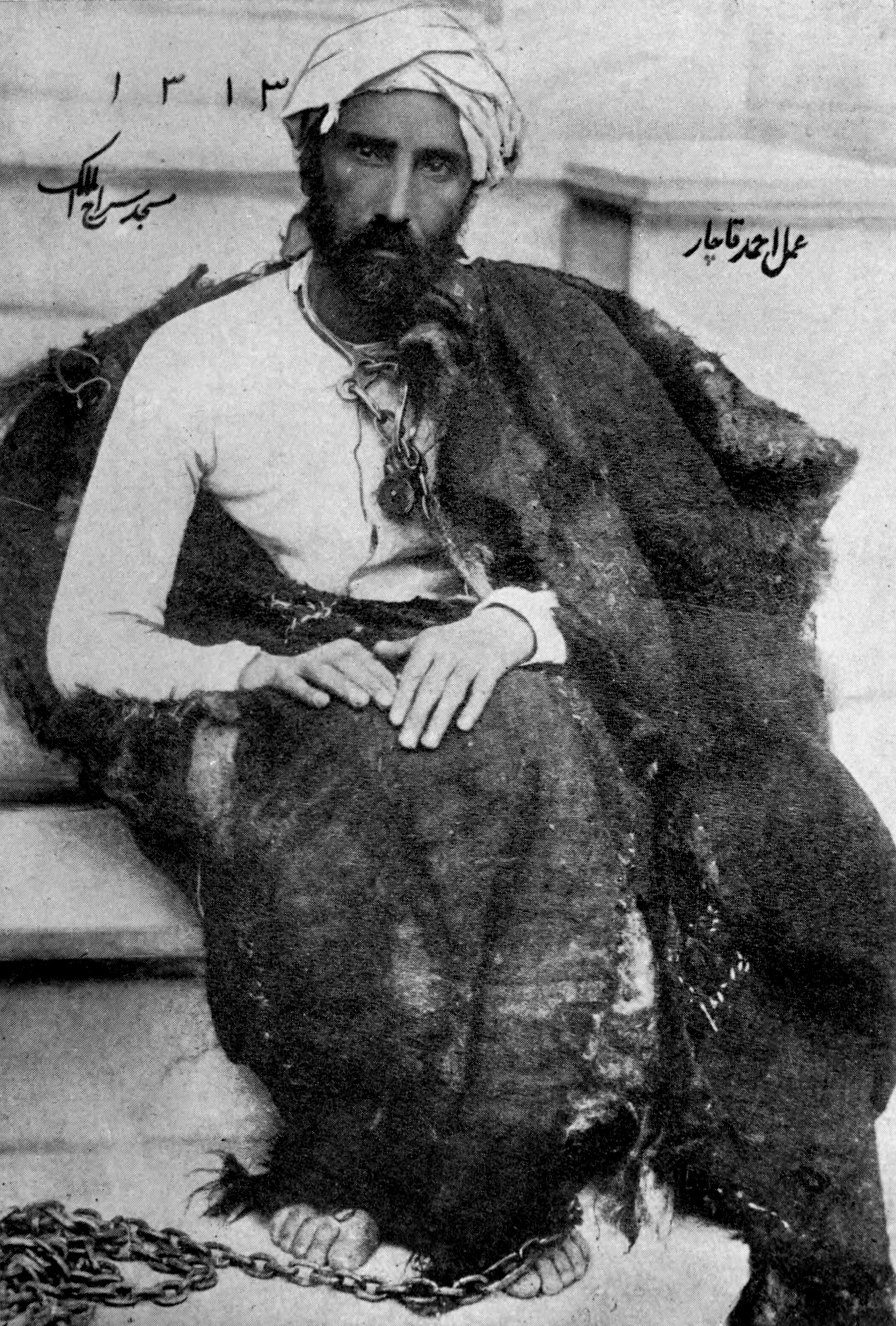
- Mirza Reza Kermani shortly before his execution
- Born: 1854; Kerman, Qajar Iran
- Died: 10 August 1896 (aged 41–42); Tehran, Qajar Iran
- Cause of death: Execution by Hanging
- Known for: Assassination of Naser al-Din Shah Qajar

Mirza Reza Kermani (Persian: میرزا رضا کرمانی; Born in 1854 in Kerman, Qajar Iran – 10 August 1896 in Tehran) was an adherent of Jamal al-Din al-Afghani and an Iranian who assassinated Naser al-Din Shah Qajar.

== Background ==
He and other followers of al-Afghani were demanding that the Qajar dynasty rule Iran justly. After al-Afghani was expelled from Iran by the Qajars, Kermani began to openly and publicly criticise Qajar officials. Eventually Kermani was imprisoned, his wife divorced him, and his son was made into a servant. In 1895, he visited Jamal al-Din al-Afghani in Istanbul, and they planned the assassination of Naser-al-Din Shah, before Kermani returned to Iran.

== Assassination of Naser al-Din Shah Qajar ==
On 1 May 1896, Kermani assassinated Naser al-Din Shah Qajar in the Shah Abdol-Azim Shrine in Rey near Tehran.

He is reported to have said "I had a chance to kill him (the Shah) before, but I didn't because the Jews were celebrating their picnic after the 8th day of Passover. I did not want the Jews to be accused of killing the Shah".

It is said that the revolver used to assassinate the Shah was old and rusty, and had he worn a thicker overcoat, or been shot from a longer range, he would have survived the attempt on his life. Shortly before his death, the Shah is reported to have said, "I will rule you differently if I survive!".

== Capture and death ==
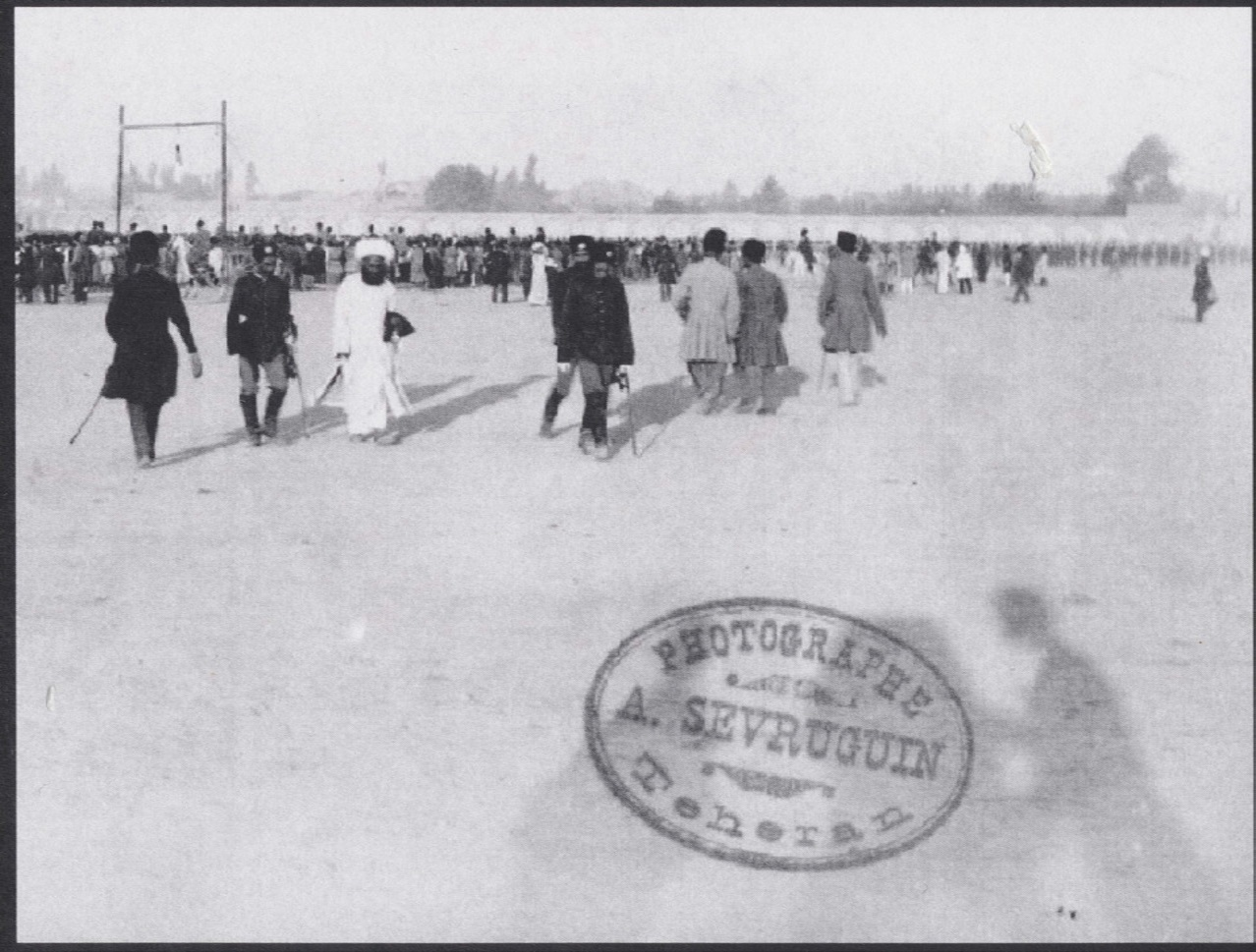
Public hanging of Mirza Reza Kermani, 1896

After killing the Shah, Mirza Reza Kermani escaped towards the border of the Ottoman Empire. Naser al-Din Shah's successor, Mozaffar ad-Din Shah Qajar, sent a detachment of troops on camels to find Mirza Reza Kermani to avenge his father's death. He was captured at the Ottoman border. After months of interrogation, Kermani was executed by public hanging on 10 August 1896.

== Consequences ==
Kermani's assassination of Naser al-Din Shah and his subsequent execution marked a turning point in Iranian political thought that would ultimately lead to the Iranian Constitutional Revolution during Mozaffar ad-Din Shah's turbulent reign; the Constitutional Revolution was the first major democratic movement in the modern Middle East, although it was preceded by the First Constitutional Era (1876–78) in the neighboring Ottoman Empire.
