= 2011 Mano Gai airstrike =

2011 Afghanistan massacre

Mano Gai airstrike
Date	March 1, 2011
Location	Dara-I-Pech District, Kunar province, Afghanistan
Result	nine children aged 8-14 killed and one wounded.

The Mano Gai or Manogi airstrike was the killing of Afghan children in Mano Gai, Dara-I-Pech District, Kunar province, Afghanistan on March 1, 2011.

Nine boys aged 8–14 were killed by gunfire from NATO helicopters while collecting firewood for their family.

The next day hundreds of Afghan villagers protested the killing chanting slogans against the United States and the Afghan government as they marched to the bombing site. General David Petraeus said "We are deeply sorry" while Mohammed Bismil, the 20-year-old brother of two boys killed in the strike said "I don't care about the apology. The only option I have is to pick up a Kalashnikov, RPG or a suicide vest to fight." President Hamid Karzai called the attack "ruthless".

== See also ==
- Deh Bala wedding party bombing 47 civilians mostly children killed in Nangarhar province, 2008
- Granai airstrike 86-145 civilians, mostly children killed in Farah province, 2009
