= Sayed Jamaluddin Afghani University =

University in Asadabad, Kunar Afghanistan

- د سید جمال الدین افغاني پوهنتون پوهنتون سید جمال الدین
- Established: 2010
- Chancellor: Shaikh Abdul Malik Mohsen
- President: Mohammad Gulab Omari
- Students: 5000
- Undergraduates: 5000
- Location: Asadabad, Kunar, Afghanistan; 34.859°N 71.140°E
- Website: sjau.edu.af

The Sayed Jamaluddin Afghani University (SJAU, Pashto: د سید جمال الدین افغاني پوهنتون; Dari: پوهنتون سید جمال الدین) or Kunar University is a public university in Asadabad, which is the capital of Kunar Province in eastern Afghanistan. It was established in 2010. The university is named after Sayed Jamaluddin Afghani, the 19th century Islamic ideologist from Asadabad. It is under Afghanistan's Ministry of Higher Education.

The university originally offered admission in three faculties: education, theology and agriculture. Over the years it expanded its operation and is considered a reliable institution in the region offering admissions in five faculties and 21 degree programs, adding Economics and Computer Science and concerned departments to the list.

On 27 April 2026, amid renewed clashes in Kunar during the 2026 Afghanistan–Pakistan war, the university was hit in airstrikes which injured at least 30 students and faculty. The Afghanistan government said that the university was struck by Pakistan. The UNAMA, OCHA, Richard Bennet (the UN Special Rapporteur on Human Rights in Afghanistan), and Richard Lindsay (EU Special Representative for Afghanistan) condemned the attack on the university saying it had caused several civilian casualties. Pakistan's Ministry of Information & Broadcasting denied it had carried out the strikes.

== See also ==
- List of universities in Afghanistan
