= Mano Gai =

- Town
- Location in Afghanistan
- Coordinates: 34°59′24″N 70°54′47″E
- Country: Afghanistan
- Province: Kunar Province
- District: Dara-I-Pech District
- Time zone: + 4.30

Mano Gai (Pashto: مانوګای) or Manogai is a small town and capital of Dara-I-Pech District in Kunar Province, in eastern Afghanistan. It lies on the confluence of several rivers.

On March 1, 2011, it was subject to the Mano Gai airstrike, killing nine boys aged 8–14 through gun fire from NATO helicopters while collecting firewood for their family. The next day hundreds of Afghan villagers protested the killing chanting slogans against the United States and the Afghan government as they marched to the bombing site.

In recent times, a 12 kilometre road project connecting Mano Gai to Chapa Dara District has been planned at an estimated cost of US$3.8 million.

A radio station, the “Voice of the Pech”, employing local reporters and radio personalities, was established in Mano Gai in 2010.
