= Battle of Maravar Pass =

1985 battle of the Soviet–Afghan War

Coordinates: 34.8706°N 71.2167°E

- Part of the Soviet–Afghan War
| Date | April 21–22, 1985 |
| Location | Sangam and Daridam, Kunar Province, Afghanistan |
| Result | Mujahideen military victory: Successful ambush by the Mujahideen |

Belligerents
| Soviet Union; Afghanistan | Afghan mujahideen Supported by: Pakistan |

Commanders and leaders
| (Soviet Union) Nikolay Tsebruk † | None |

Strength
| 334th Detached Spetsnaz Group; VDV 66th Airborne Brigade Air Assault Battalion | Unknown |

Casualties and losses
| 31 killed unknown number captured | Unknown |

The Battle of Maravar Pass (also known as Marawara Pass) was an operation by the 334th Detached Spetsnaz group in the Afghan villages of Sangam and Daridam on April 21, 1985, during the Soviet–Afghan War. Mujahideen forces ambushed the Soviet force in Maravar Gorge, cutting off its 1st company and inflicting heavy casualties. As Soviet reinforcements arrived, the mujahideen covered the civilian evacuation of the gorge and successfully carried out a fighting withdrawal.

== Advance ==
On March 27, 1985, less than one month before the operation, the 334th Separate Special Purpose Group (OO SpN) was transferred to Asadabad, Province Kunar, Afghanistan from Mariansky Gorki, Belorussian Military District, USSR.

On April 20, 1985, at 10:00 p.m., the group deployed from their home base Asadabad on foot, crossing the river Kunar by ferry, having received orders to investigate the settlement of Sangam located in Maravar Gorge, a mere 3 kilometres (1.9 mi) from the unit's quarters. There was a report that a mujahideen observation post with 8–10 people had been spotted in Sangam. The unit's commanders planned the operation as a large-scale training exercise. The plan was to have the 1st Company advance toward the settlement through the narrow gorge's floor while the 2nd and 3rd Companies were to cover their advance from the ridges framing the gorge.

The 1st Company entered Sangam by 5:00 am and searched the settlement. There were no opposition forces in the village, but two mujahideen were spotted retreating further into the gorge. From his command post located near the entrance of the gorge the 334th detachment commander, Major Terentyev, ordered the capture or neutralization of the enemy.

The 1st Company commander, Captain Tsebruk, divided his men into 4 platoons and began advancing towards the Daridam settlement located 2 kilometres (1.2 mi) deeper into the gorge. The groups were moving on both sides of the gorge's bottom without any flank cover from the ridges. Only the commander of the 3rd Company had a full view of Daridam, from his position atop the ridge above Sangam, and so was the only person able to report the unfolding events to Major Terentyev.

First to encounter hostile combatants was Lieutenant Nikolai Kuznetsov's platoon. Immediately, Captain Tsebruk set out toward the shooting accompanied by 4 riflemen. He left his radio operator and the platoon he had led behind to occupy an elevated terrace. It is believed that at this point Captain Tsebruk grasped the situation and attempted to remedy the situation, but was mortally wounded in the throat and died.

At this point Major Terentyev lost his control over the flow of the battle. The trap snapped shut behind the 1st Company: using the buses the enemy was able to circle to the rear of the 1st Company and block their retreat. On the flanks, mujahideen heavy machine guns were emplaced on both ridges to cover the elevated approaches to Daridam; they effectively blocked the 2nd and 3rd Companies from advancing to assist the 1st Company.

Left on their own, the 1st Company personnel took firing positions wherever they could. In desperation, they took cover behind the low mud walls. Some soldiers lit the orange smoke grenades to call for air rescue. The enemy numbers were overwhelming and the Soviet soldiers had only a limited supply of ammunition, which was exhausted within minutes of combat.

== Attempted rescue ==
While the events in the Maravar Gorge were unfolding, the troops remaining at the home base of 334th OO SpN at Asadabad were alerted. Hastily, they began assembling an armored column out of the remaining vehicles. The column was reinforced by the armor detachment of an infantry battalion located nearby. The heavy vehicles could not be loaded onto the local ferry, so the column had to cross Kunar via a 10 kilometres (6.2 mi)–distant bridge, and then drive 13 kilometres (8.1 mi) back toward the Maravar Gorge. The trip between the Asadabad base and Sangam settlement, a 3 kilometres (1.9 mi) distance on the map, turned into a 23 kilometres (14 mi) grind across the rugged, mine-seeded Afghan terrain. Only one BMP out of the entire armored column was able to reach Maravar Gorge that morning. It could not alter the fate of the 1st company in Daridam, but it quite possibly had saved the 2nd and 3rd companies, now under intensive attack in Sangam.

Later in the afternoon of April 21, the armored column with the supporting infantry reached the Maravar Gorge. They were met by the exhausted survivors carrying the injured. They told a horrid tale of the fate of captured Russians, who were beheaded by the mujahideen.

== Aftermath ==
Later, the Soviet troops were reinforced by 154th OO SpN and the Air Assault Battalion of the 66th Brigade arriving on helicopters from Jalalabad. The 2nd battalion of the 66th Brigade had also marched into the mountains from Asadabad. What was planned as a training raid had grown into a major combat operation involving 4 battalions and frontline aviation units.

The mujahideen continued fighting for 2 more days, covering the exodus of the civilian refugees from Sangam and Daridam settlements to Pakistan. Three more soldiers lost their lives during mopping-up operations. US and Afghan National Army forces subsequently fought a battle against the Taliban near the same location in 2010 during Operation Strong Eagle.
