= Chitral River =

River in Pakistan and Afghanistan

Coordinates: 34.4021°N 70.5367°E

Chitral River Kunar
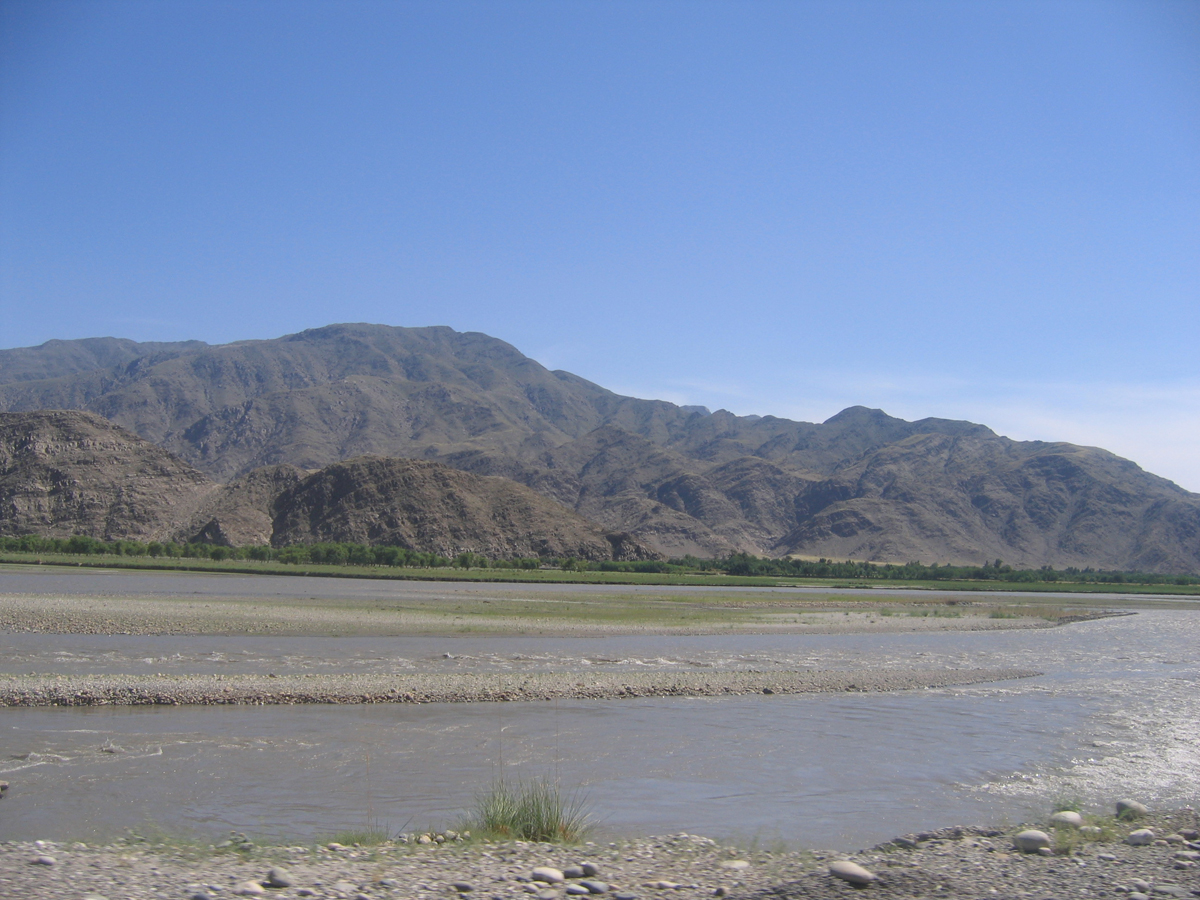

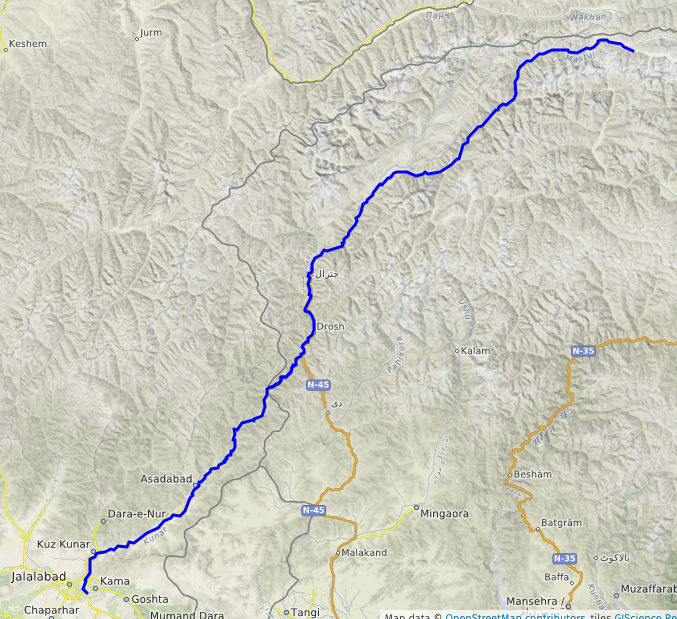
- Course of the Chitral River

Location
- Countries: Pakistan and Afghanistan
- Districts/Provinces: Chitral (Pakistan): Nuristan; Kunar; Nangarhar; (Afghanistan)

Physical characteristics
- Source: Hindu Kush Mountains in Chitral
- Mouth: Kabul River
  - location: Jalalabad
- Length: 480 km (300 mi)
- Basin size: 26,000 km^{2} (10,000 sq mi)
- Discharge
  - location: Chitral City Gauge
  - average: 292 m^{3}/s (10,300 cu ft/s)

Basin features
- Progression: Kabul→ Indus→ Arabian Sea
- Tributaries
  - left: Shishi River
  - right: Lotkoh River, Landai Sin River, Pech River

The Chitral River, (Note: Khowar: ݯھیترارو سین; Urdu: دریائے چترال) also known in Afghanistan as the Kunar River, (Note: Dari: رودخانه کنر; Pashto: کونړ سيند) is a 480 kilometres (300 mi) long river in northern Pakistan and eastern Afghanistan. It originates from the Chiantar Glacier, located at the border of Gilgit Baltistan and Chitral in Pakistan. At Arandu it enters into Afghanistan, where it is called the Kunar River. It later merges with Kabul River in Nangahar Province of Afghanistan. The river system is fed by melting glaciers and snow of the Hindu Kush mountains. The Chitral River serves as a major tributary of the Kabul River, which is in turn a tributary of the Indus River in Pakistan.

== Course ==
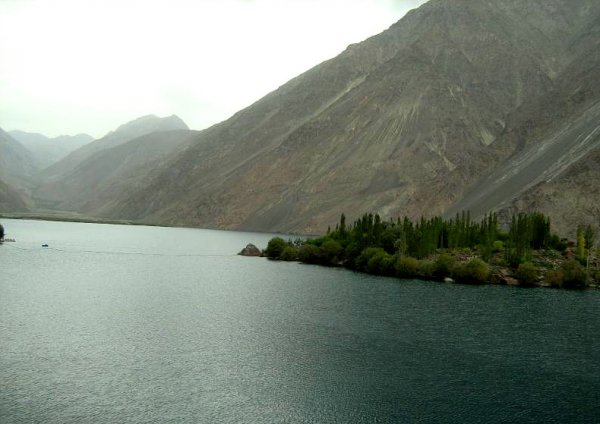
The river in the Chitral Valley, Pakistan

The river rises in the far north glaciated Hindu Kush mountains of Chitral, Pakistan, where it is referred to as Chitral River. Around 60% to 70% of annual discharge of Kunar River originates from Chitral. Downstream as far as the town of Mastuj, it is called as the Mastuj River, until its confluence with the Lotkoh River. The river then turns southwards into the upper Kunar Valley of Afghanistan. At Asadabad, it meets with Pech River and finally empties into the Kabul River just to the east of the city of Jalalabad in Afghanistan. The combined rivers then flow eastwards into Pakistan again, and joins the Indus River at the city of Attock.

The river in the Kunar Valley, Afghanistan

== Hydrology ==
The mean annual discharge of Chitral River is 292 m^{3}/s (10,300 cu ft/s) near Chitral City Gauging Station. It is a major tributary of Kabul River.

== See also ==
- Konar Dam
