= Pech River =

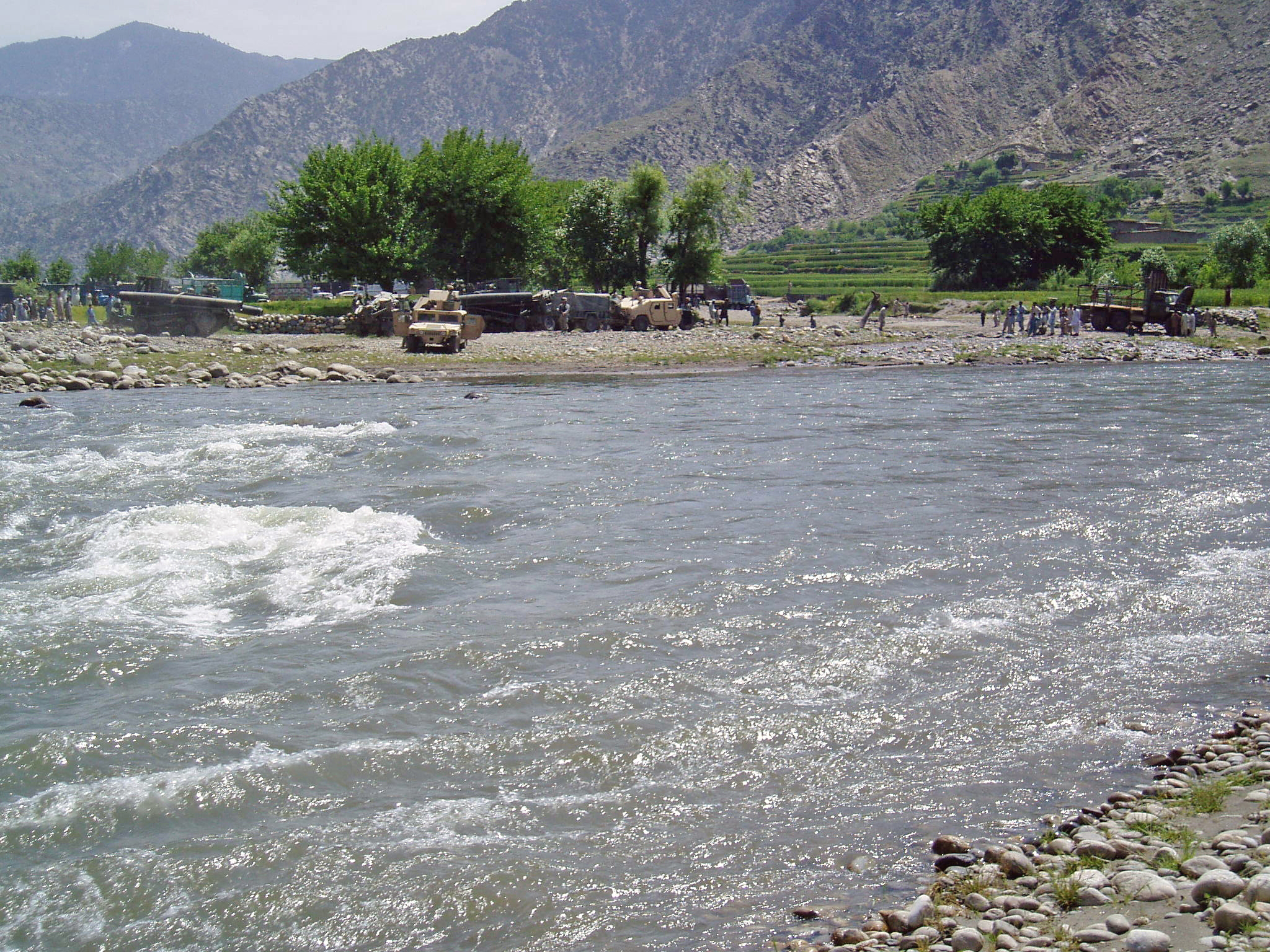
- Members of TF Spartan during an assessment of the river valley in April 2008

Location
- Country: Afghanistan

Physical characteristics
- Source
  - coordinates: 35°26′8.87″N 70°32′8.65″E
- Mouth: Kunar River
  - location: Asadabad
  - coordinates: 34°52′17.15″N 71°9′33.76″E
  - elevation: 812 m (2,664 ft)

Basin features
- River system: Kunar River → Kabul River → Indus River
- Tributaries
  - left: Waygal River

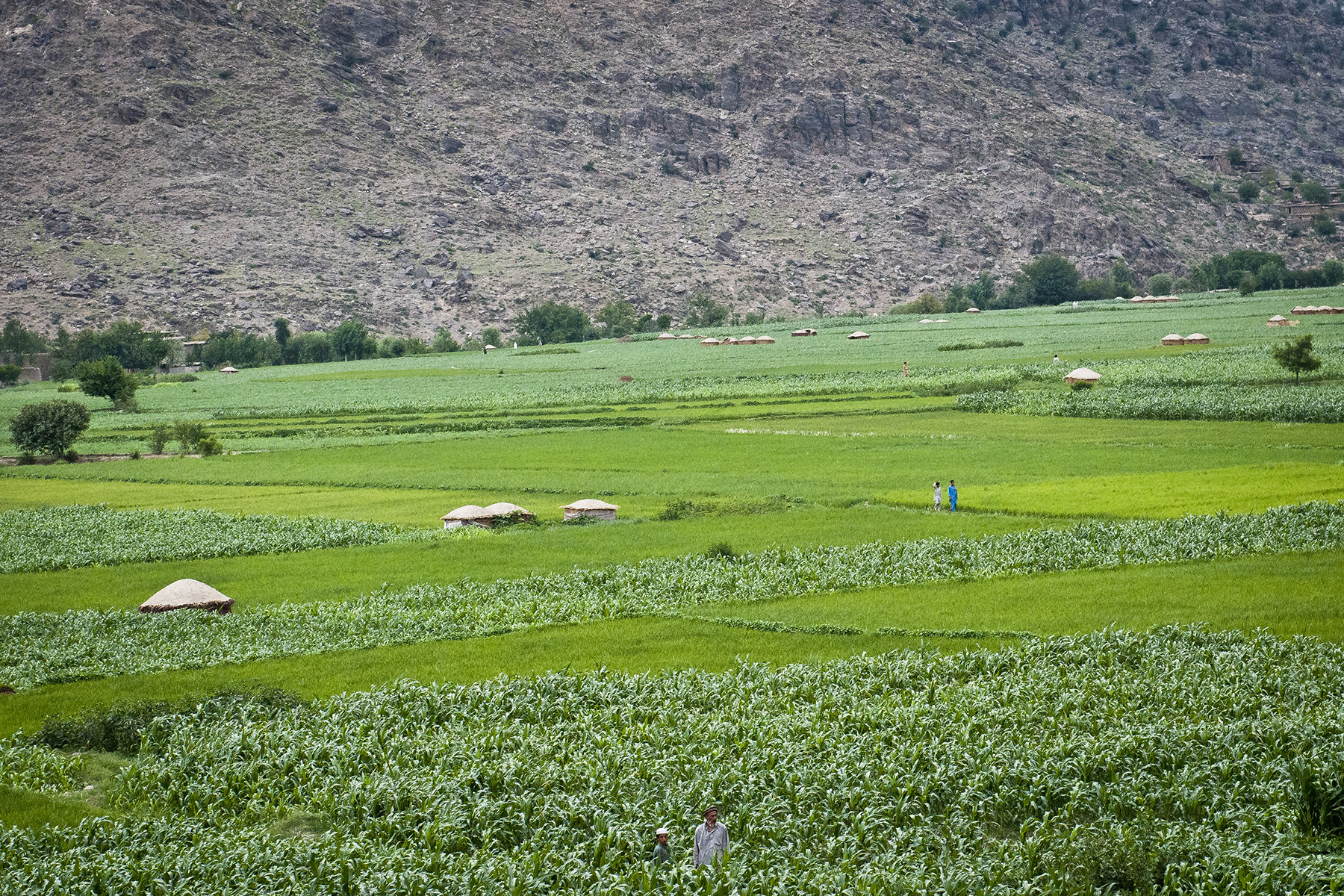
Fields along the Pech River

The Pech River (Pashto: پېچ سيند) is located in eastern Afghanistan.

== Course ==
The Pech River system is fed from glaciers and snow from the Hindu Kush range to its north. The river rises in central Nuristan Province and flows south and southeasterly through the center of Kunar Province, joining the Kunar River (Asmar River, Loy Seend) at the provincial capital of Asadabad. The Kunar is a tributary of the Kabul River, part of the Indus River basin.

The river has numerous tributaries forming valleys on both sides. These include the Chapa Dara, Waygal, Korangal Valley (site of the film Restrepo), Watapur, and Sharyak valleys.

== Culture ==
In the Pech Valley, Pashto and the Askunu languages are spoken. The Safi tribe of Pashtuns is the majority population in the Pech Valley.

The river's largest settlement is Nangalam, at the confluence of the Waygal River with the Pech River.

== Military history ==
There were a series of U.S. military bases along the Pech River Valley in Kunar Province, including COP Honaker-Miracle, COP Able Main, COP Michigan, and the largest − FOB Blessing. In 2011 former FOB Blessing was abandoned by the Afghan National Army (ANA), and the 25th Infantry Division returned to reestablish the area of influence. The new name was COP Nangalam, with a majority of control in the hands of the ANA. In late 2012 with the ANA in control of and the establishment of ANA Fire bases in and along the area that COP Michigan was the U.S. Army's 4th Infantry Division's 4th Brigade Combat Team. U.S. President Barack Obama then pulled the American forces from the valley again, ceding it to the Taliban due to the questionable ability and loyalty of the ANA.

The 2012 book Siren's Song: The Allure of War, by Antonio Salinas, depicts the experience of an American platoon operating in the Pech River Valley.

The 2016 book Hammerhead Six: How Green Berets Waged an Unconventional War Against the Taliban to Win in Afghanistan's Deadly Pech Valley, by Ronald Fry with Tad Tuleja, depicts the experience of American Special Forces deployed there.

The 2021 book The Hardest Place by Wesley Morgan details the failed US counterinsurgency campaign in northeastern Afghanistan, including the Pech valley.

== See also ==
- Kabul River topics
- List of rivers of Afghanistan
