= Asadabad, Afghanistan =

Asadabad اسعد‌آباد
- Provincial capital
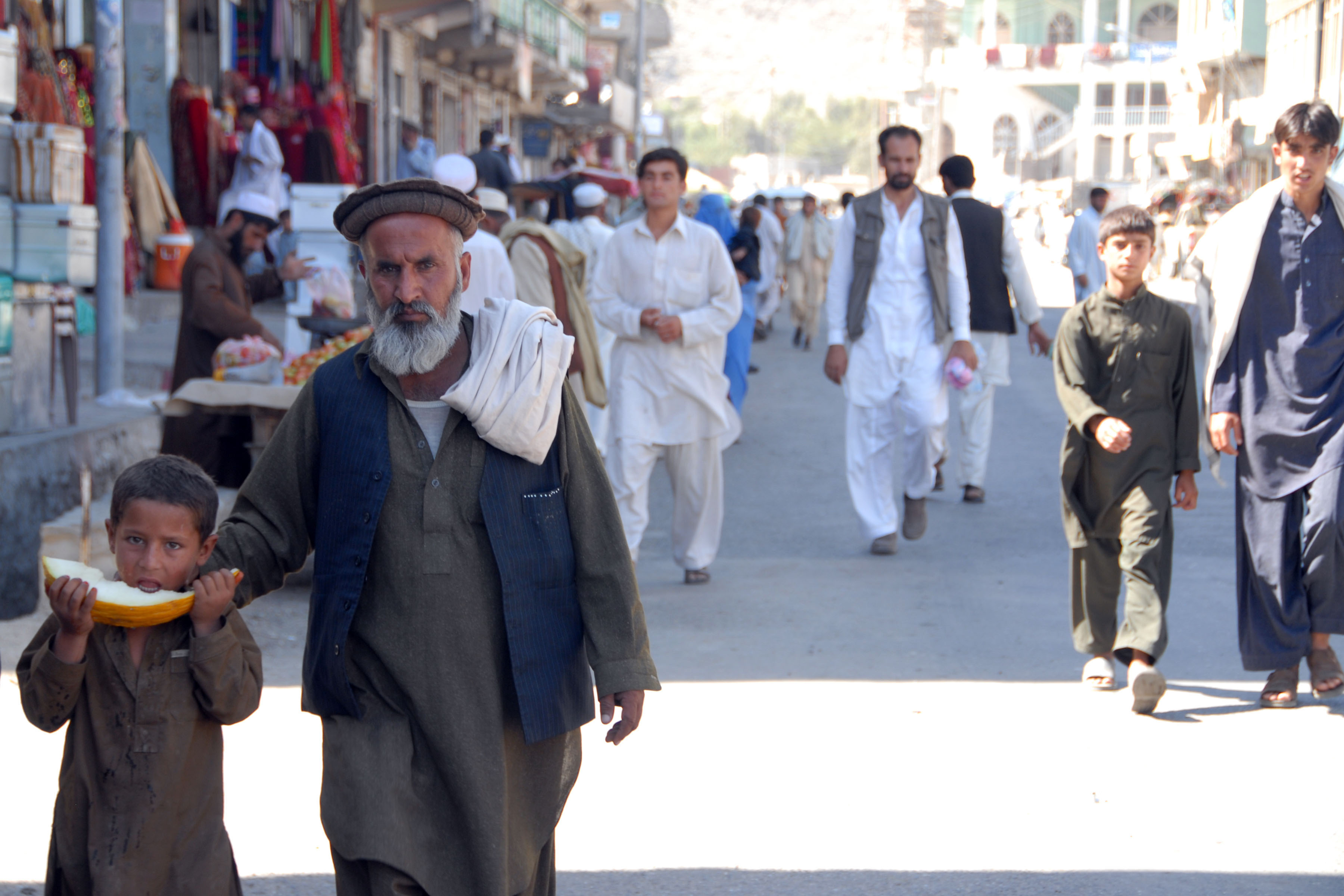
- Street scene in Asadabad

- Location in Afghanistan
- Coordinates: 34°52′27″N 71°9′10″E
- Country: Afghanistan
- Province: Kunar
- District: Asadabad

Government
  - Type: Municipality
  - Mayor: Mullah Nazar Mohammad Attiq

Area
  - Land: 92 km^{2} (36 sq mi)
- Elevation: 827 m (2,713 ft)

Population (2025)
  - Provincial capital: 42,396
  - Urban: 17,926
  - Rural: 24,470
- Time zone: UTC+04:30 (Afghanistan Time)
- ISO 3166 code: AF-ASD

Asadabad (Pashto; (Note: Pashto pronunciation: [ʔa'sa.dɑ.'bɑd]) Dari: (Note: Dari pronunciation: [ʔä.sǽ'd̪ɑː.bɑ́ːd̪]) اسعد‌آباد), historically called Chighansarai (Pashto; (Note: Pashto pronunciation: [t͡ʃa.ɣa.sə.rɑɪ]) Dari: (Note: Dari pronunciation: [t͡ʃʰä.ɣǽ.sǽ.ɾɑːɪ]) چغسرای), is a city in eastern Afghanistan, serving as the capital of Kunar Province. It is within the jurisdiction of Asadabad District and has an estimated population of 42,396 people. Mullah Nazar Mohammad Attiq is the current mayor of the city.

Asadabad is home to the Sayed Jamaluddin Afghani University, which is located in the southwestern part of the city. Asadabad also has a number of bazaars, business centers, public parks, banks, hotels, restaurants, mosques, hospitals, universities, and places to play sports or just relax. In 2015 there were 6,350 dwelling units in the city.

Asadabad is located within a valley at the confluence of the Pech River and the Kunar River, between two mountain ridgelines running along both sides of the valley from northeast to southwest. It is in Afghanistan's Hindu Kush mountains about 13 km (8.1 mi) northwest of the Durand Line (Afghanistan-Pakistan border) and 80 km (50 mi) northeast of Jalalabad in Nangarhar Province.

== History ==
The surrounding Kunar Province lies near the historic routes connecting Central Asia with Hindustan, such as the Silk Road and the Grand Trunk Road through the Khyber Pass, as well as routes through the Hindu Kush mountains. Asadabad lies at the confluence of the two major rivers of the area, the Kunar River and the Pech River. The region would have come under the borders of various empires of the ages, including the Achaemenid Empire and the Greco-Bactrian Kingdom. It was very close to the paths Alexander the Great passed by on his way from conquering Persia to invading Hindustan. Asadabad is also on the eastern boundary of what was Kafiristan - a small part of Afghanistan not converted to Islam until the 1890s. One testament to this is the Waigali name of nearby Dam Kelay, Dam Kil.

In the past, the area near Asadabad was referred to as "Chighan Sarai", with various spellings (Chaga Serai, Chagasaray, Chigur Serai, Chughansuraee). Babur claimed to have taken over the town as part of his military campaigns in the area. He described it very briefly in Baburnama. He also mentioned relations with the locals, whom he claimed helped defend the town against him.

In the late 19th century/early 20th century the capital of the region was moved from Pushoot/Pasat/Pasad to the present Asadabad location. Over the 20th century, various technical improvements were made such as roads, a shopping area, schools, a bridge, a gas station, etc.

=== Soviet Afghan war ===
In the opening times of the Soviet Afghan war (1979–1988), Kunar province saw some of the first rebellions against the People's Democratic Party of Afghanistan (PDPA). As punishment, PDPA troops with Soviet advisors massacred the males of the nearby village of Kerala, burying their bodies in a field near Pech River. Asadabad was later linked to a Soviet military base during the war, which included Spetsnaz. Several Russian websites, like http://asadabad.ru, contain discussions and photos regarding this era.

In January 1979, an estimated 5,000 members of the Afghan mujahideen attempted to capture the town, which was the headquarters of the Afghan Army's 9th Division. In 1985, in the Battle of Maravar Pass the mujahideen killed 31 Soviet troops in an ambush.

The mujahideen later took control of the town from the Soviet forces. Gulbuddin Hekmatyar's Hezbi Islami had heavy influence in the area. Osama bin Laden also spent time in Asadabad.

On 20 April 1991, the marketplace of Asadabad was hit by two Scud missiles, which killed 300 and wounded 500 inhabitants. Though the exact toll is unknown, these attacks resulted in heavy civilian casualties. The explosions destroyed the headquarters of Jamil al-Rahman and killed a number of his followers.

=== 21st century ===
In 2001 the war on terror began with the invasion of Afghanistan, including Kunar Province. Forward Operating Base Camp Wright was set up a few kilometres south of Asadabad. According to an article, the camp was originally built by the Soviets. Asadabad was captured by the Taliban on 14 August 2021, as part of the wider 2021 Taliban offensive. On April 28, 2026, Pakistan bombed a university in Asadabad killing 7 civilians and injuring 75 civilians.

== Geography ==
Asadabad is a city in eastern Afghanistan. It is located within a valley at the confluence of the Pech River and Kunar River, between two mountain ridgelines running along both sides of the valley from northeast to southwest. It is in Afghanistan's Hindu Kush mountains about 13 km (8.1 mi) northwest of the Durand Line (Afghanistan-Pakistan border) and 80 km (50 mi) northeast of Jalalabad in Nangarhar Province.

Asadabad is administratively divided into 7 city districts (nahias), covering a land area of 92 km^{2} (36 sq mi) or (9,245 ha (22,840 acres)).

=== Climate ===
Asadabad has a humid subtropical climate (Cfa) under the Köppen climate classification system. The average annual temperature in Asadabad is 18.1 °C (64.6 °F). About 960 mm (37.80 in) of precipitation falls annually.

Climate data for Asadabad
Month	Jan	Feb	Mar	Apr	May	Jun	Jul	Aug	Sep	Oct	Nov	Dec	Year
Record high °C (°F)	19.5 (67.1)	22.8 (73.0)	31.9 (89.4)	36.4 (97.5)	44.1 (111.4)	45.4 (113.7)	44.7 (112.5)	43.1 (109.6)	41.5 (106.7)	34.1 (93.4)	29.0 (84.2)	25.0 (77.0)	45.4 (113.7)
Mean daily maximum °C (°F)	12.2 (54.0)	15.0 (59.0)	19.4 (66.9)	25.0 (77.0)	29.4 (84.9)	33.9 (93.0)	32.8 (91.0)	31.1 (88.0)	30.6 (87.1)	25.6 (78.1)	19.4 (66.9)	15.6 (60.1)	24.2 (75.5)
Daily mean °C (°F)	6.1 (43.0)	8.9 (48.0)	13.6 (56.5)	18.6 (65.5)	22.8 (73.0)	27.0 (80.6)	27.8 (82.0)	26.7 (80.1)	24.8 (76.6)	19.2 (66.6)	13.1 (55.6)	8.9 (48.0)	18.1 (64.6)
Mean daily minimum °C (°F)	0.0 (32.0)	2.8 (37.0)	7.8 (46.0)	12.2 (54.0)	16.1 (61.0)	20.0 (68.0)	22.8 (73.0)	22.2 (72.0)	18.9 (66.0)	12.8 (55.0)	6.7 (44.1)	2.2 (36.0)	12.0 (53.7)
Record low °C (°F)	−15.2 (4.6)	−13.7 (7.3)	−10.0 (14.0)	−7.8 (18.0)	1.4 (34.5)	8.3 (46.9)	9.7 (49.5)	11.2 (52.2)	5.9 (42.6)	−1.3 (29.7)	−9.3 (15.3)	−13.1 (8.4)	−15.2 (4.6)
Average precipitation mm (inches)	69 (2.7)	106 (4.2)	136 (5.4)	110 (4.3)	49 (1.9)	37 (1.5)	156 (6.1)	146 (5.7)	43 (1.7)	27 (1.1)	40 (1.6)	41 (1.6)	960 (37.8)
Average snowfall cm (inches)	1.2 (0.5)	0.4 (0.2)	0.0 (0.0)	0.0 (0.0)	0.0 (0.0)	0.0 (0.0)	0.0 (0.0)	0.0 (0.0)	0.0 (0.0)	0.0 (0.0)	0.0 (0.0)	0.0 (0.0)	1.6 (0.7)
Source 1: Nomadseason, NASA Power (Extremes 1990-2021)
Source 2: Climate-Data.org (Precipitation) weather atlas(snow)

== Economy ==
The economy of Asadabad is mainly based on agriculture, trade, and transport. About 10 to 15 percent of the valley surrounding the city is used for agriculture by using an ancient land development technique called terracing. However, flooding and erosion have been an issue in the past. The primary crops are wheat, rice, sugarcane and vegetables. Multiple international agencies have assisted with these issues and other issues throughout the province.

As of January 2009, growth around Asadabad has been substantial. Examples of development are:

- Kunar province's main marketplace now has more than 600 stores, up from 100 just three years ago.
- Provincial Reconstruction Teams (PRTs) have constructed 16 schools, 20 medical clinics, and 8 district centers.
- PRTs completed construction on 13 roads and 11 bridges.
- Agribusiness Developmental Teams (ADTs) have several evolving projects and over 10 demonstration farms.
- Jalalabad-Asmar and Pech River roads have cut travel times in half and connected Asadabad centers of commerce with Jalalabad.

== Sport ==
Cricket, football, futsal and volleyball are the most popular sports in Afghanistan. The Kunar Cricket Ground opened in 2018 and has played host to first-class cricket matches in the Ahmad Shah Abdali 4-day Tournament and the Mirwais Nika Provincial 3-Day Tournament. The ground is most notable for a match between Kabul Region and Boost Region in the 2018 Ahmad Shah Abdali 4-day Tournament, when Kabul batsman Shafiqullah scored the fastest double century in first-class cricket. He scored 200 not out from 89 balls, and also scored the most sixes in a first-class match, with 24.

== Education ==
There are a number of public and private schools in Asadabad. There are also a number of universities. The Sayed Jamaluddin Afghani University is one of the largest ones.

== Notable residents and incidents ==
- U.S. Navy Lieutenant Michael P. Murphy was posthumously awarded the Medal of Honor for his actions during Operation Red Wings, which took place in the mountainous terrain near Asadabad from June to July 2005.
- US Operations: "Big East Wind" and Operation Mountain Lion
- A man named Abdul Wali was tortured to death by CIA contractor David Passaro at the nearby US military base in 2003. Wali had brought himself in for questioning regarding the rocket attacks on the base, at the suggestion of the provincial governor, who told him he wouldn't be harmed. Passaro was later convicted of assault after 82nd Airborne Division troops testified against him. He received 8+ years in prison.

== Sister cities ==
- Union City, California, United States

== Gallery ==
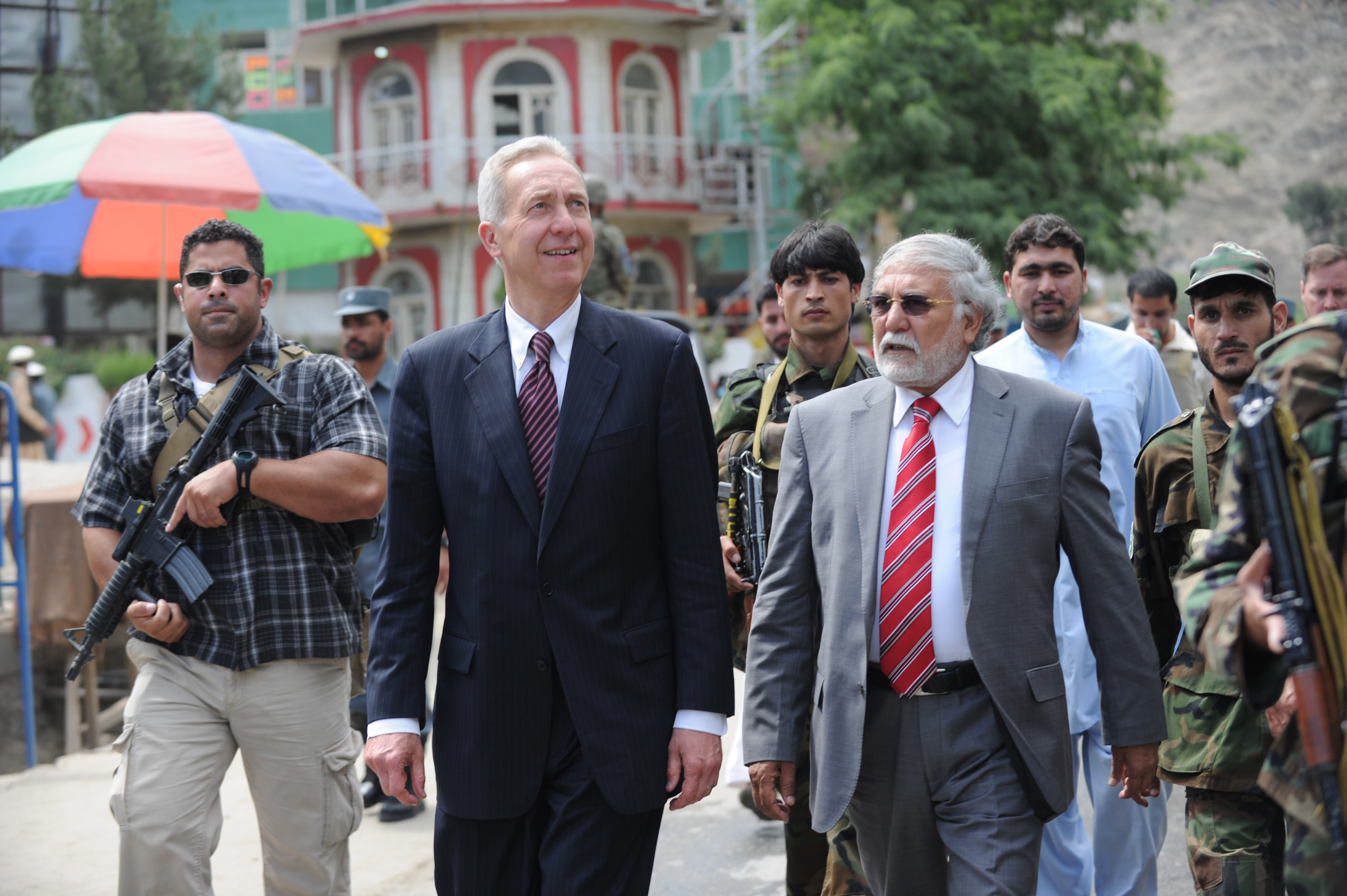
U.S. Ambassador Hans G. Klemm, Coordinating Director of Rule of Law and Law Enforcement, and Kunar Governor Fazlullah Wahidi walking through Asadabad in May 2011

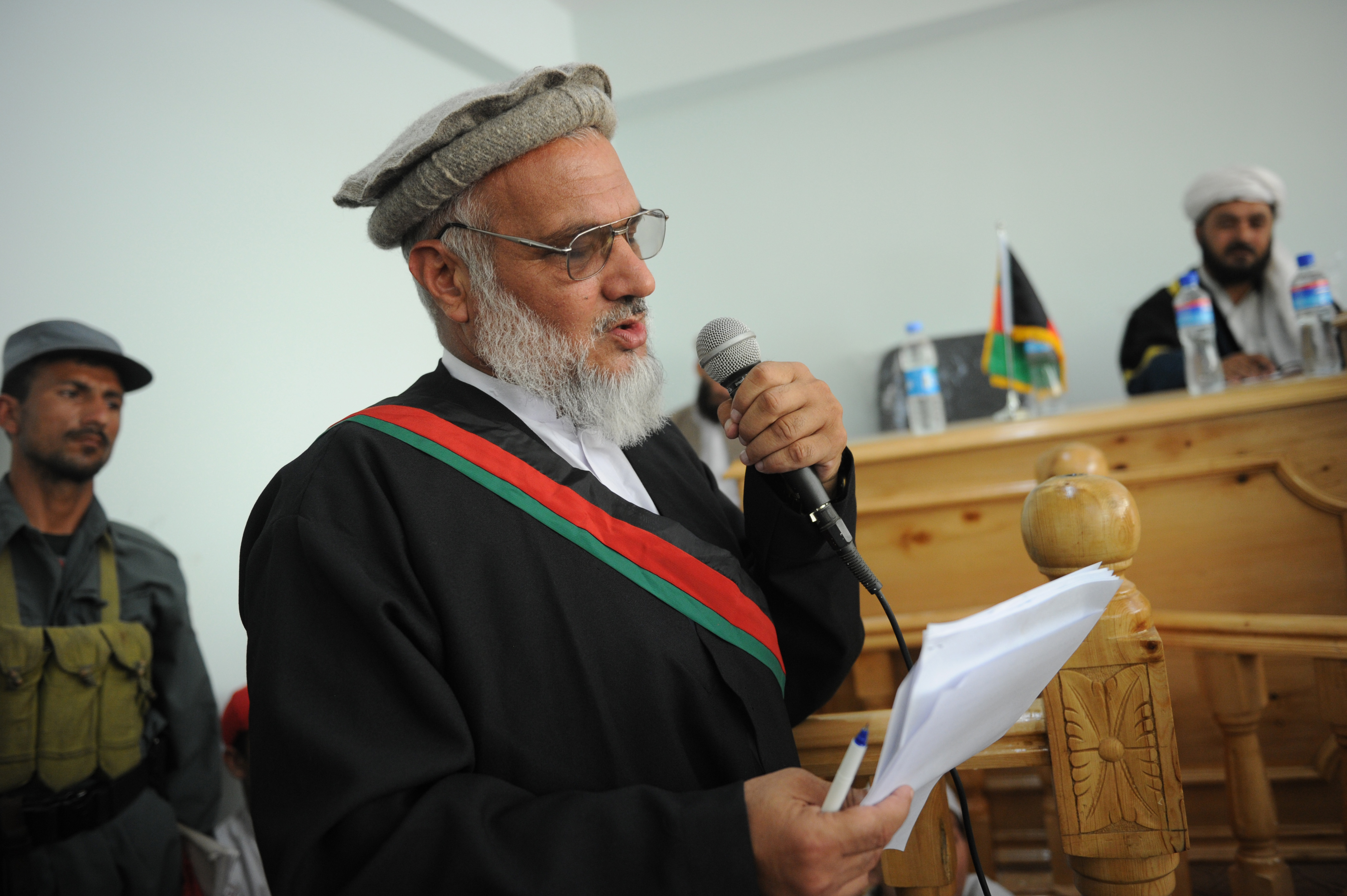
Inside a courtroom in Asadabad

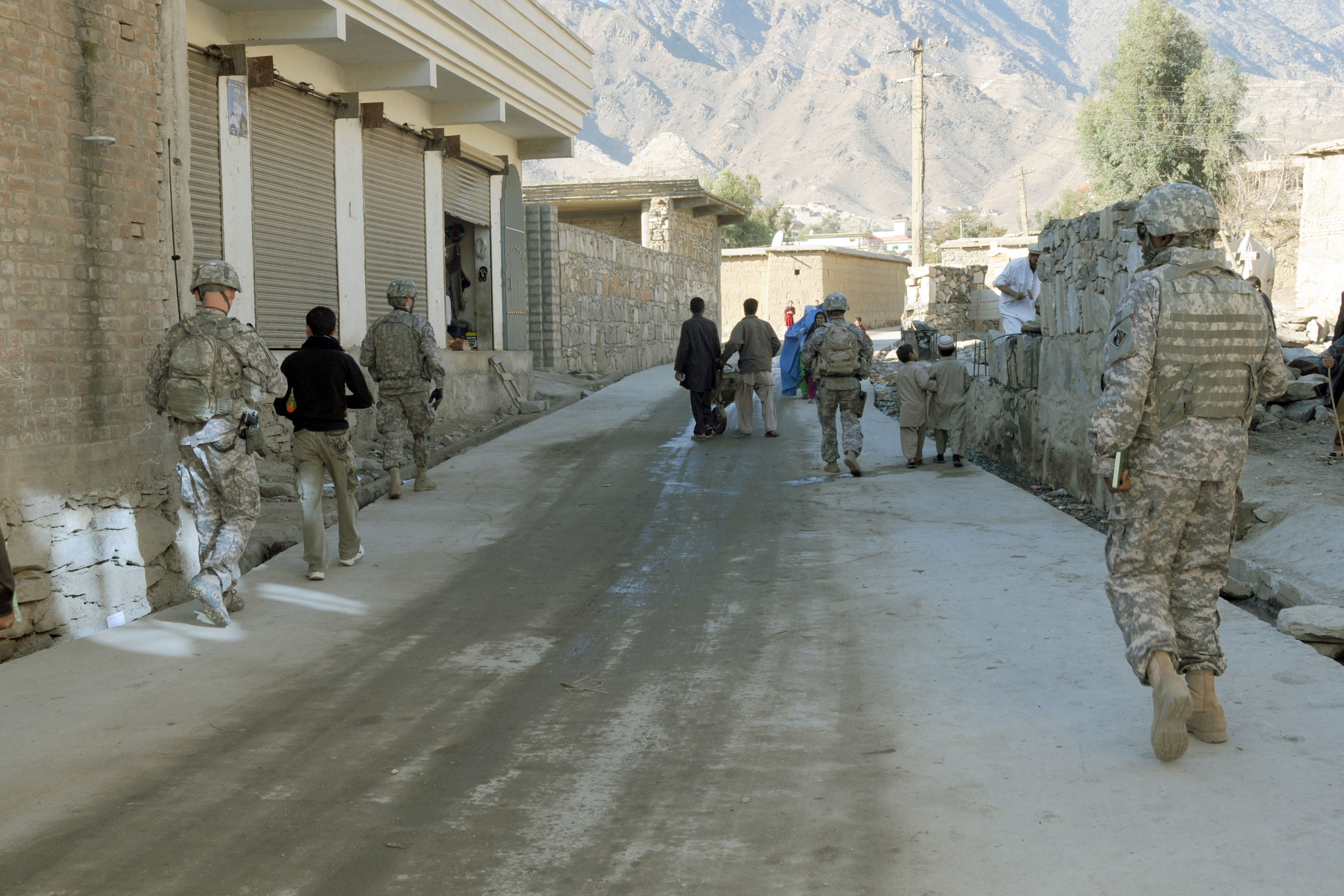
Members of Kunar Provincial Reconstruction Team (PRT-Kunar) walk in the streets of Asadabad.

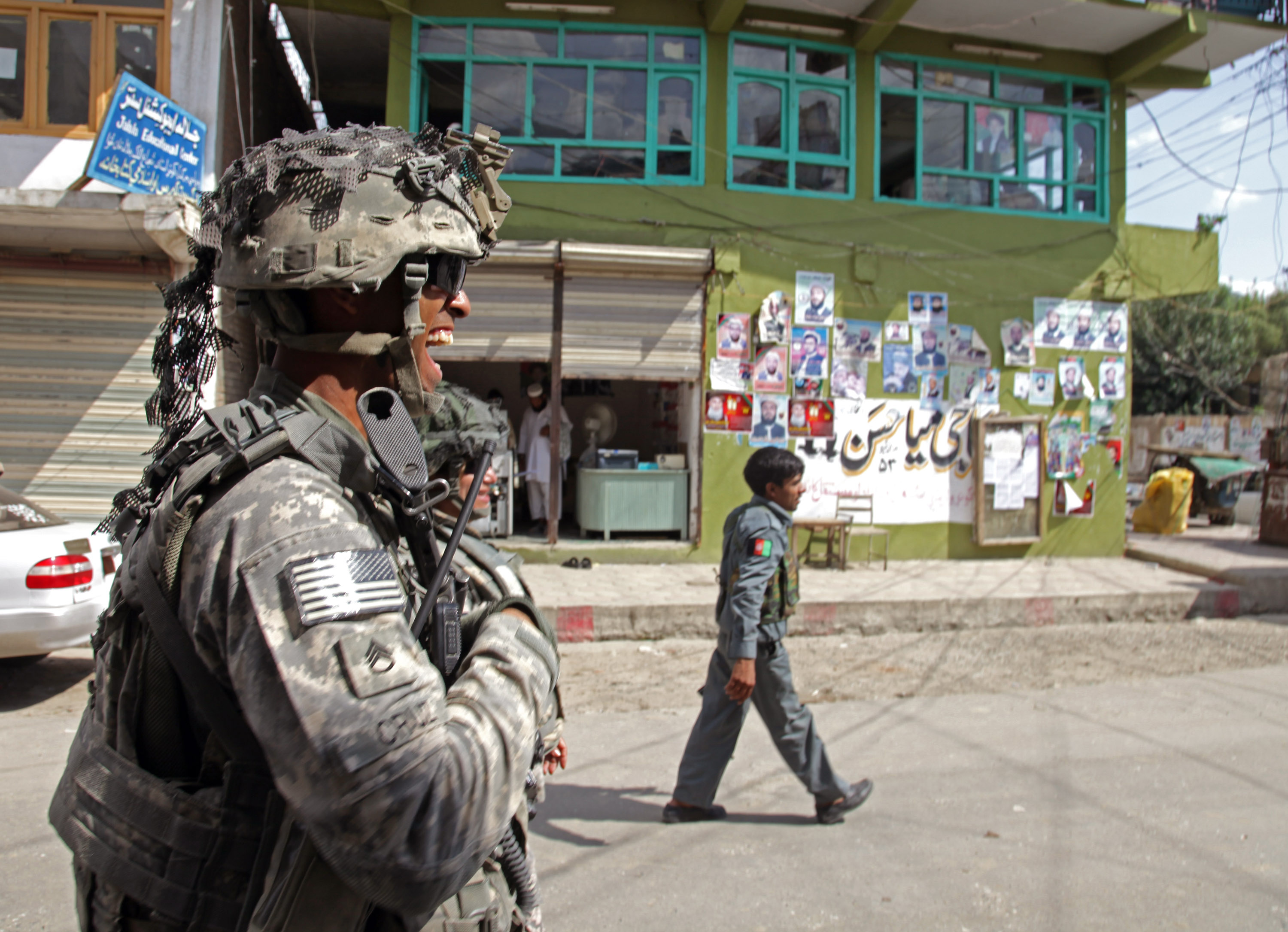
U.S. Army Staff Sgt. Michael Cruz of Cortland, New York, conducts a patrol with Afghan National Security Forces (ANSF) through the streets of Asadabad in August 2009.
