= Donald Dunn =

Donald Dunn may refer to:

- Donald "Duck" Dunn (1941–2012), American bass guitarist, session musician, record producer, and songwriter
- Donald G. Dunn (1923–2021), decorated U.S. Army veteran of World War II
