= 10th Sustainment Brigade =

10th Mountain Division Sustainment Brigade
- Insignia of the 10th Mountain Division
- Active: 1 July 1957 - present
- Country: United States
- Allegiance: United States of America
- Branch: United States Army
- Role: Sustainment
- Size: Brigade
- Part of: XVIII Airborne Corps
- Nickname: Muleskinners
- Motto: Support The Climb/Sustain The Climb

Insignia
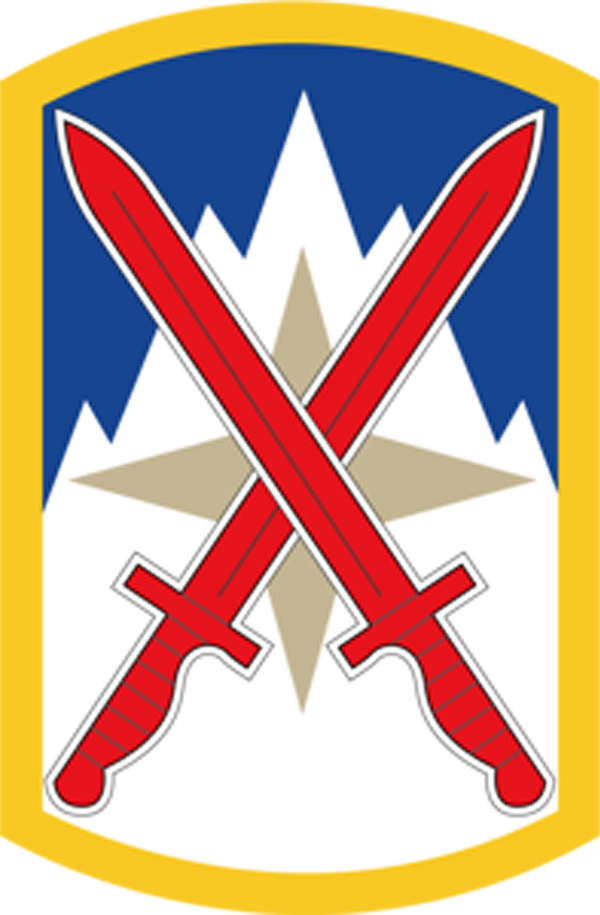
- Former shoulder sleeve insignia

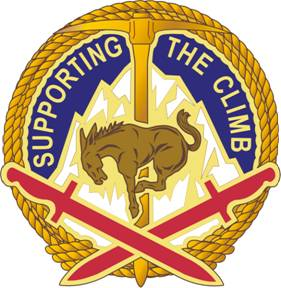
- Distinctive Unit Insignia

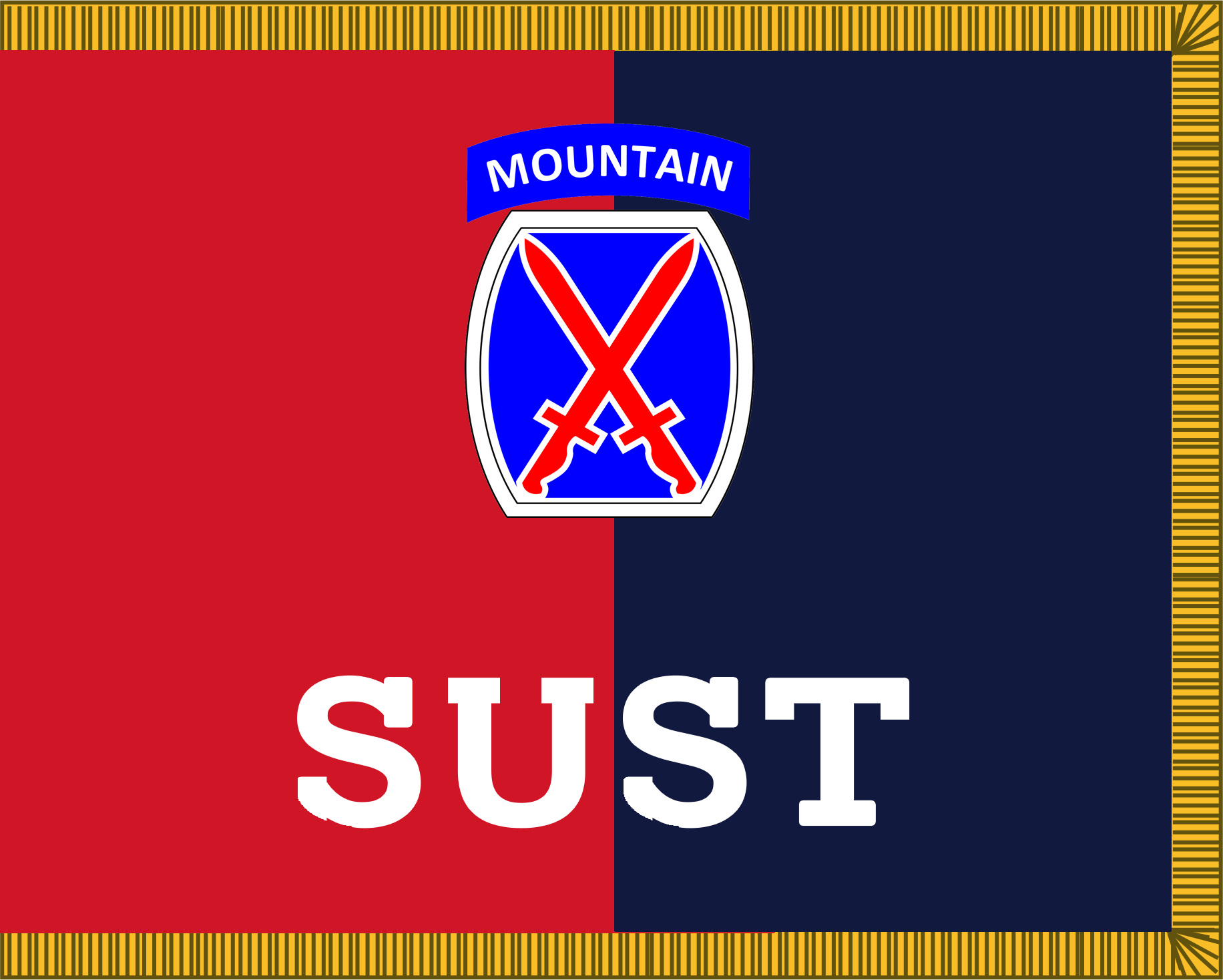
- 10th Mountain Division Sustainment Brigade Flag

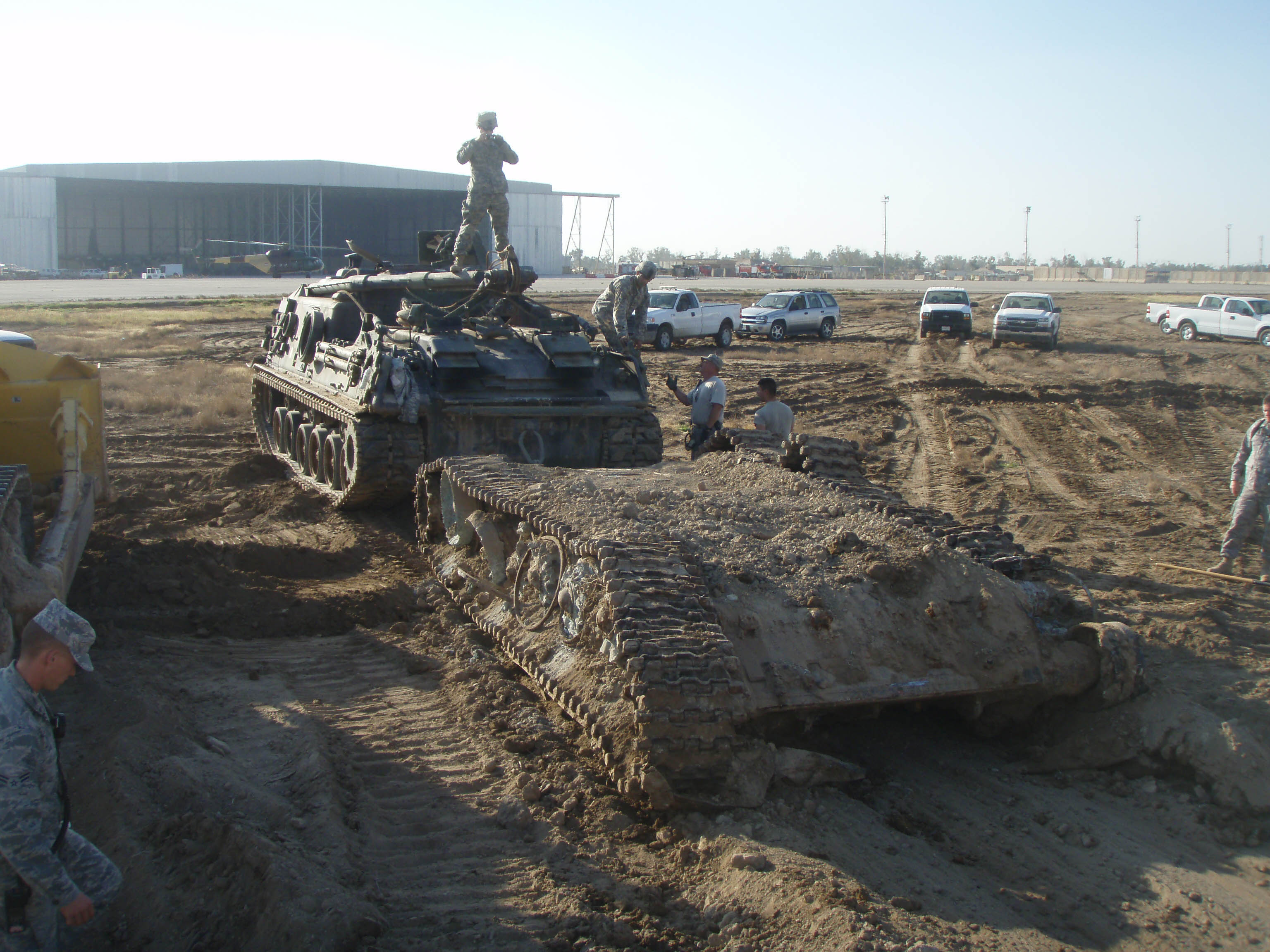
10th Sustainment Brigade soldiers unearth a tank in Iraq.

The 10th Sustainment Brigade, officially redesignated as the 10th Mountain Division Sustainment Brigade in May 2015, is a sustainment brigade of the United States Army. It provides logistical support to the 10th Mountain Division and is located on Fort Drum in Northern New York State.

== History ==
=== Origins ===
The soldiers of the 10th Division Support Command (DISCOM) can trace their heritage directly back to the Alpine Infantrymen and their pack mules that formed the Mountain Medical, Quartermaster, and Ordnance Maintenance Battalions which supported the US 10th Infantry Division during World War II. The Division Trains, as they were called, were organized and assigned to the 10th Infantry Division on 14 June 1957 and activated in Germany On 1 July 1957.

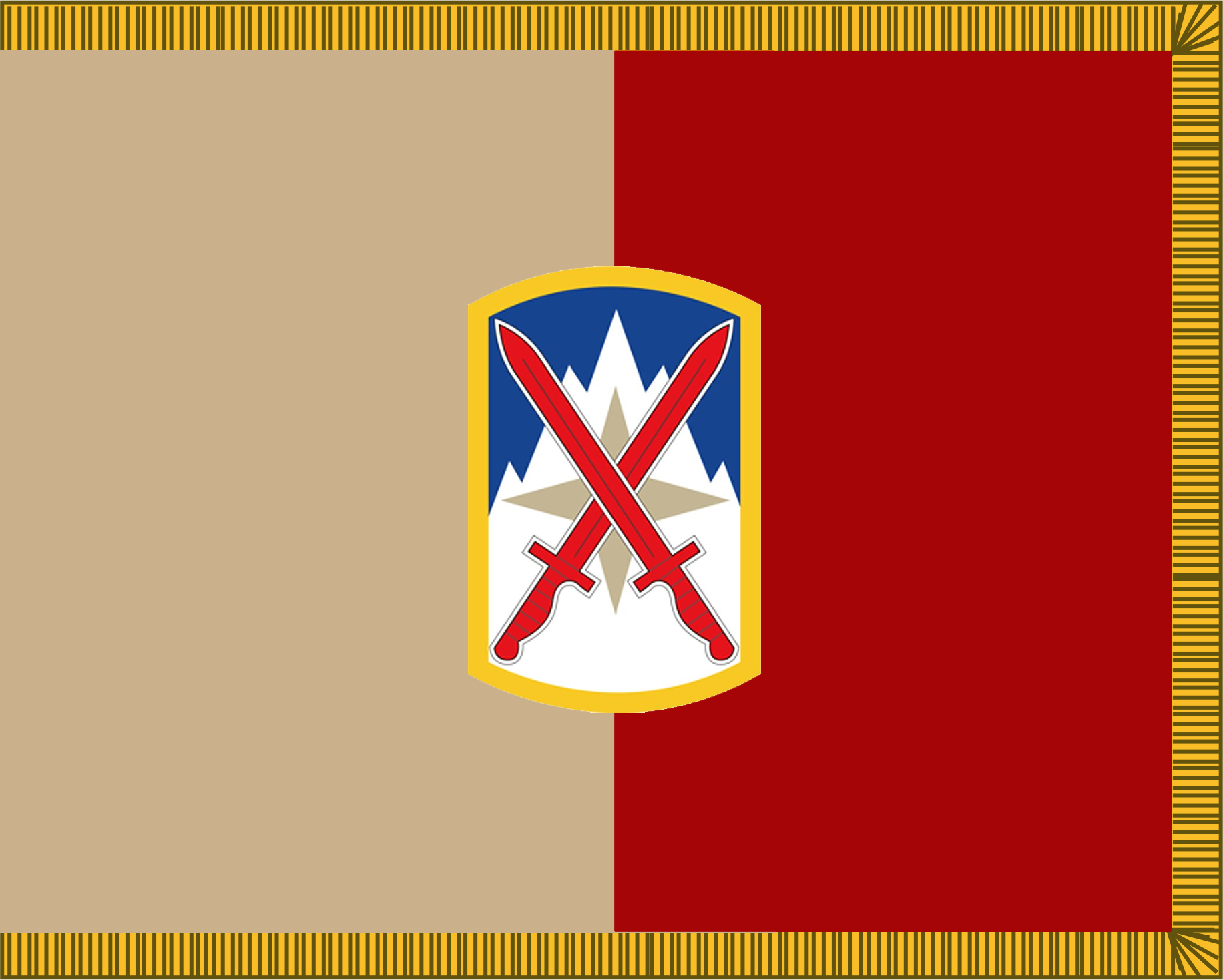
10th Sustainment Brigade Flag

When the Division was officially reactivated as the 10th Mountain Division on 13 February 1985 at Fort Drum, New York, the Division Trains found a new home. Redesignated as the 10th Division Support Command, the headquarters element organized with the 10th Supply and Transportation Battalion, the 10th Medical Battalion, and the 710th Maintenance Battalion (which became the 10th Forward Support Battalion, the 210th Forward Support Battalion, and the 710th Main Support Battalion respectively), all committed to supporting the Mountain soldiers in this new Light Infantry Division. On 16 August 1987, the 548th Supply and Services Battalion was moved from Fort McClellan, Alabama, and was assigned to the Fort Drum Garrison. On 16 November 1993, the battalion was reorganized as the 548th Corps Support Battalion and became part of the 10th DISCOM.

=== Gulf War ===
Since its reactivation, the 10th DISCOM has deployed in support of multiple operations, both in the United States and abroad. In September 1990, the 548th CSB deployed to Southwest Asia for Operations Desert Shield and Desert Storm, providing critical combat service support to units operating in Saudi Arabia and Iraq.

=== Hurricane Andrew ===
In August, 1992 elements of the 10th DISCOM deployed to Florida in support of Hurricane Andrew Relief Operations, providing desperately needed supply, maintenance, and medical support to the general public and government agencies involved in the reconstruction of south Florida and the Gulf States.

=== Operation Restore Hope ===
In December, 1992 the 10th DISCOM deployed again, this time to Somalia in support of Operation Restore Hope. The ranks and responsibilities of the Muleskinners grew dramatically as they sustained, maintained, and cared for several rotations of Division soldiers while supporting humanitarian assistance to the local population.

=== Operation Uphold Democracy ===
In September 1994, the 10th DISCOM was called upon again and deployed with the Division to Haiti in their traditional role as providers and sustainers, while also supporting humanitarian operations as part of Operation Uphold Democracy.

=== The Balkans ===
In August 1999, elements of the 10th DISCOM deployed to the Balkans in support of peacekeeping operations as part of Task Force Eagle in Bosnia. In November 2001, elements from the DISCOM deployed to Kosovo in support of Task Force Falcon.

The 10th Sustainment Brigade is a sustainment brigade of the United States Army. It provides logistical support to the 10th Mountain Division and is located on Fort Drum in Northern New York State.

== Units ==
- 10th Division Special Troops Battalion (10th DSTB)
  - HHC (Headquarters and Headquarters Company)
  - 226 Signal Company
  - 510 Human Resources Company
  - 620th Movement Control Team
  - 593rd Field Feeding Company
- 548th Division Sustainment Support Battalion (548th DSSB)
  - HHD (Headquarters and Headquarters Detachment)
  - Alpha Company
  - Bravo Company
  - Charlie Company
