= 10th Mountain Division Artillery =

- Insignia of the 10th Mountain Division
- Active: 1942 - present
- Country: United States of America
- Branch: United States Army
- Type: Field artillery
- Role: Division force fires HQ
- Size: Brigade
- Garrison/HQ: Fort Drum, New York
- Engagements: World War II

Commanders
- Current commander: COL Thomas A. Goettke
- Command Sergeant Major: CSM Freddie Thompson IV

Insignia
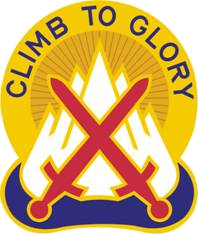
- Distinctive unit insignia

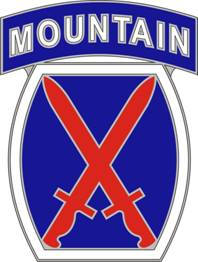
- Combat service identification badge

The 10th Mountain Division Artillery (DIVARTY) is the divisional artillery command for the 10th Mountain Division. The DIVARTY served with the division from 1942 to the present, including fighting in World War II, Somalia and in Afghanistan and Iraq, and in peacetime in Germany; Fort Benning, Georgia; Fort Riley, Kansas; and Fort Drum, New York.

== History ==
=== World War II ===
During the Second World War, the divisional artillery included the 604th Field Artillery Battalion (Pack); the 605th Field Artillery Battalion (Pack); and the 616th Field Artillery Battalion (Pack).

== Lineage ==
- Constituted in the Regular Army on 28 May 1930 as Headquarters and Headquarters Battery, 10th Field Artillery Brigade, assigned to the Panama Canal Division, and allotted to the Panama Canal Department
- Consolidated on 12 October 1936 with the 10th Field Artillery Brigade, 10th Division (a World War I unit organized in August 1918 at Camp Funston, Kansas; demobilized in February 1919 at Camp Funston; reconstituted on 12 October 1936)
- Constituted 27 August 1942 in the Army of the United States as Headquarters and Headquarters Battery, Mountain Training Center Artillery
- Activated 5 September 1942 at Camp Carson, Colorado
- Reorganized and redesignated 15 July 1943 as Headquarters and Headquarters Detachment, 10th Light Division Artillery
- Reorganized and redesignated 6 November 1944 as Headquarters and Headquarters Battery, 10th Mountain Division Artillery
- Inactivated 30 November 1945 at Camp Carson, Colorado
- Redesignated 18 June 1948 as Headquarters and Headquarters Battery, 10th Division Artillery
- Allotted 25 June 1948 to the Regular Army
- Activated 1 July 1948 at Fort Riley, Kansas
- Redesignated 1 July 1957 as Headquarters and Headquarters Battery, 10th Infantry Division Artillery
- Inactivated 14 June 1958 at Fort Benning, Georgia
- Redesignated 2 May 1987 as Headquarters and Headquarters Battery, 10th Mountain Division Artillery, and activated at Fort Drum, New York
- Inactivated 6 August 2004 at Fort Drum, New York
- Activated 16 October 2015 at Fort Drum, New York

Note: the linkage between the 10th Mountain Division Artillery and the 10th FA Bde (Panama Canal Dept) and 10th FA Bde (10th Division) is tenuous, and may not bear out when the Army updates the official lineage.

== Campaign participation credit ==
- World War II: North Apennines, Po Valley
- War on Terror: campaigns to be determined

== Army Football uniforms ==
In December 2017, the Army Black Knights football team wore all-white uniforms honoring the 10th Mountain Division in their annual rivalry game against the Navy Midshipmen football team.
