= Steven L. Arnold =

American Army general

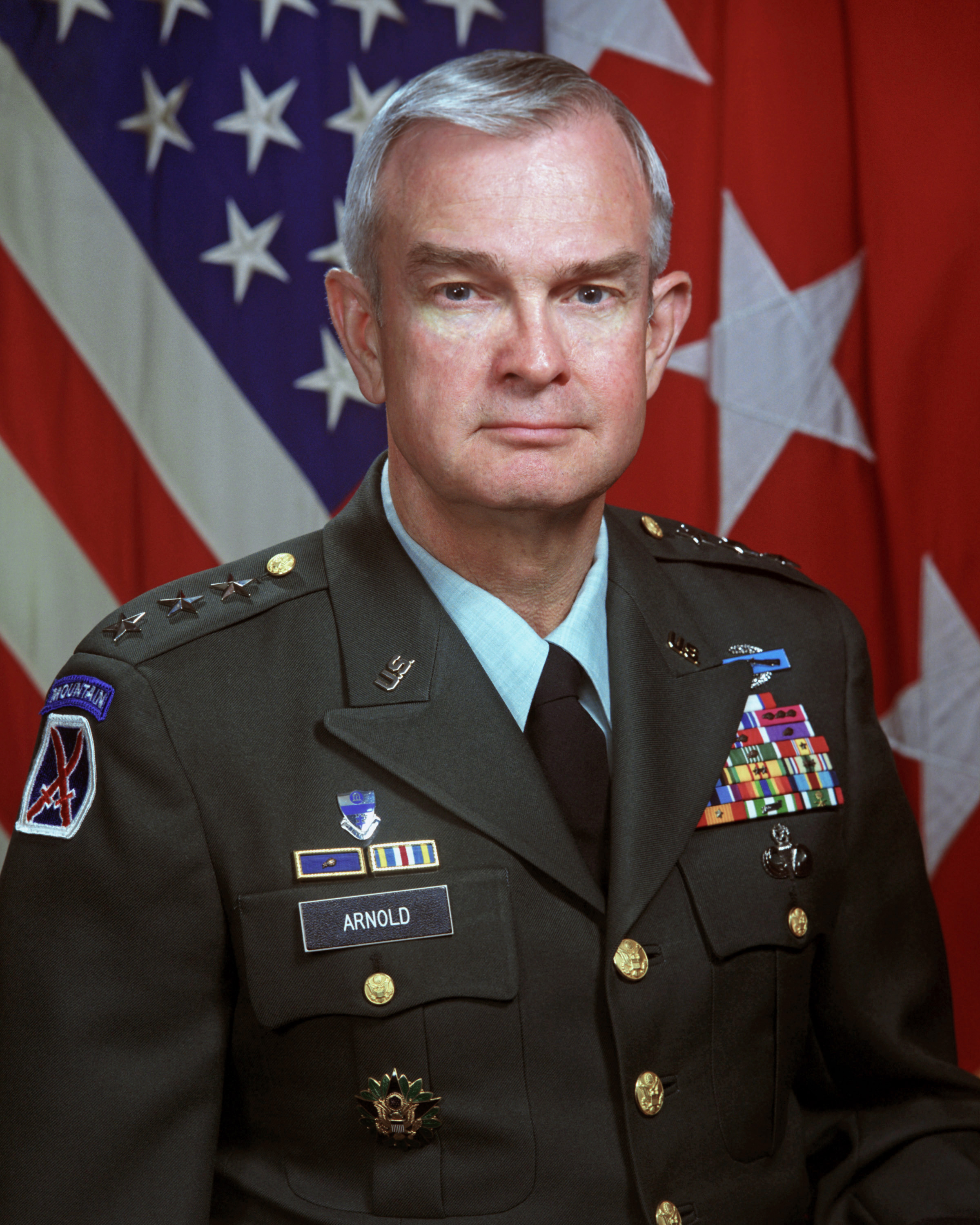
- Born: 8 January 1940 (age 86); Illinois, U.S.
- Military career
- Allegiance: United States
- Branch: United States Army
- Service years: 1962–1997
- Rank: Lieutenant General
- Commands: Third United States Army; 10th Mountain Division; 2nd Brigade, 82nd Airborne Division; 2nd Battalion, 13th Infantry Regiment; 1st Battalion, 68th Armor Regiment; Company A, 2nd Battalion, 502nd Airborne Infantry
- Conflicts: Vietnam War; Gulf War
- Awards: Distinguished Service Medal; Silver Star Medal (2); Legion of Merit (4); Bronze Star Medal (2); Purple Heart (2)

Steven Lloyd Arnold (born 8 January 1940) is a retired lieutenant general in the United States Army who served as commander of the Third United States Army and deputy commander of FORSCOM from 1994 to 1997. He previously served as commanding general of the 10th Mountain Division from 1991 to 1993.

== Early life and education ==
Born in Illinois, Arnold graduated from the United States Military Academy in 1962 with a B.S. degree. He later earned an M.A. degree in political science from Auburn University and an M.S. degree in systems management from the University of Southern California. Arnold is also a graduate of the Air Command and Staff College and the Army War College.

== Military career ==
Arnold served with the 2nd Battalion, 502nd Airborne Infantry, 101st Airborne Division in Vietnam, commanding a company and earning two Silver Star Medals and two Purple Hearts.

Arnold later served with the 8th Infantry Division in West Germany, commanding the 1st Battalion, 68th Armor Regiment and the 2nd Battalion, 13th Infantry (Mechanized). He subsequently served as commander of the 2nd Brigade, 82nd Airborne Division at Fort Bragg.

As a brigadier general, Arnold served as assistant commander of the 2nd Infantry Division at Camp Casey in South Korea. He then became operations officer for the Third U.S. Army in Saudi Arabia, where he led planning for Operation Desert Storm during the Gulf War.

As a major general, Arnold served as deputy commander of the First U.S. Army at Fort Meade, commander of the 10th Mountain Division (Light Infantry) at Fort Drum, and Assistant Deputy Chief of Staff for Operations and Plans at the Pentagon. As the 10th Mountain Division commander, he participated in relief efforts after Hurricane Andrew in 1992 and then in Operation Restore Hope in Somalia. Promoted to lieutenant general, Arnold assumed command of the Third U.S. Army in July 1994.

Arnold was inducted into the Army Ranger Hall of Fame in 2015.

== Personal ==
Arnold is the son of Charles Dean Arnold (22 February 1914 – 8 July 1988) and Lois Evelyn (McNicol) Arnold (24 January 1916 – August 1982). His older brother Stanley Dean Arnold (6 October 1934 – 23 November 1993) was an Army aviator and Vietnam veteran who retired as a lieutenant colonel.
