= Thomas N. Burnette =

U.S. Army lieutenant general (1944–2019)

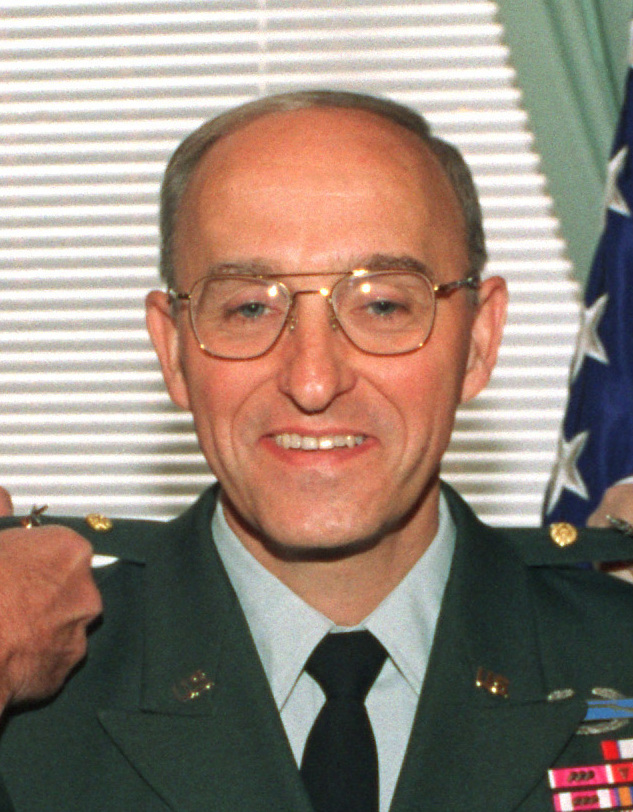
- Lt. Gen. Burnette in 1997
- Born: October 23, 1944; Macon, Georgia, U.S.
- Died: April 1, 2019 (aged 74); Savannah, Georgia, U.S.
- Alma mater: United States Military Academy; Georgia Institute of Technology (MSOR); U.S. Army Command and General Staff College; Industrial College of the Armed Forces
- Spouse: Susan Elizabeth Hall (m. 1968; died 2019)
- Children: 2
- Military career
- Allegiance: United States
- Branch: United States Army
- Service years: 1962–2001
- Rank: Lieutenant General
- Commands: 10th Mountain Division; 2nd Brigade, 10th Mountain Division; 2nd Battalion, 87th Infantry Division
- Conflicts: Vietnam War
- Awards: Defense Distinguished Service Medal; Army Distinguished Service Medal (2); Legion of Merit (4)

Thomas Nelson Burnette Jr. (October 23, 1944 – April 1, 2019) was a retired lieutenant general in the United States Army. He served as deputy commander in chief of U.S. Joint Forces Command from 1999 to 2000 and deputy chief of staff for operations and plans of the United States Army from 1997 to 1999.

== Early life and education ==
Born in Georgia, Burnette enlisted in the Army in June 1962. After a year in the United States Military Academy Preparatory School, he entered West Point in July 1964 and graduated in 1968, commissioning as a second lieutenant of infantry. He later earned a master's degree in operations research from the Georgia Institute of Technology. Burnette is also a graduate of the United States Army Command and General Staff College and the Industrial College of the Armed Forces.

== Military career ==
In his early career, Burnette served with the 82nd Airborne Division in Vietnam, first as an enlistee and then platoon leader with 2nd Battalion. His command and staff positions were under the 82nd Airborne Division, 10th Mountain Division and the office of the Deputy Chief of Staff for Operations and Plans.

As a brigadier general, Burnette served as commander of the 2nd Brigade, 10th Mountain Division. He then became executive officer to the Secretary of the Army before being assigned as assistant division commander of the 82nd Airborne Division.

As a major general, Burnette commanded the 10th Mountain Division from July 1995 to July 1997. Future division commander Franklin L. Hagenbeck served as Burnette's chief of staff.

Burnette's was confirmed for promotion to lieutenant general on June 27, 1997, with date of rank effective November 1, 1997. He was assigned as the deputy chief of staff for operations and plans of the Army Staff from 1997 until 1999, before assuming his final assignment as deputy commander in chief of the United States Joint Forces Command from 1999 to 2000. At his retirement ceremony, Burnette was awarded the Defense Distinguished Service Medal. He officially retired on January 1, 2001.

== Later life and death ==
From 2001 to 2012, Burnette served as a senior mentor to a number of U.S. Army-affiliated corporations. He died in an apparent murder-suicide at his home on April 1, 2019, in Savannah, Georgia, where he and his wife Susan were found dead by Chatham County police. His body was cremated upon completion of the investigation.

== Personal life ==
Burnette was introduced to Susan Elizabeth Hall in 1967 by his brother Ronald in Atlanta, and they married in 1968. They had two children.
