= 10th Mountain Division =

Combat formation of the United States Army

- 10th Mountain Division Shoulder Sleeve Insignia
- Active: 10 July 1943–30 November 1945; 25 June 1948–14 June 1958; 22 January 1985–present
- Country: United States of America
- Branch: United States Army
- Type: Light infantry
- Size: Division
- Part of: XVIII Airborne Corps
- Garrison/HQ: Fort Drum, New York
- Nickname: The Mountaineers
- Motto: "Climb to Glory"
- Colors: Red and Blue
- Engagements: World War II; North Apennines; Po Valley; Somalia; Haiti; Operation Uphold Democracy; Afghanistan War; Iraq War

Commanders
- Current commander: Major General Scott M. Naumann
- Deputy Commanding General – Operations: Brigadier General Adam M. Cobb
- Deputy Commander – Readiness: Colonel Jennifer A. Mykins
- Command Sergeant Major: Command Sergeant Major Brett W. Johnson
- Notable commanders: George P. Hays; James Edward Moore; Thomas L. Harrold; Philip De Witt Ginder; Barksdale Hamlett; James L. Campbell; Franklin L. Hagenbeck; Lloyd Austin; Benjamin C. Freakley; Michael L. Oates; James L. Terry; Mark A. Milley

Insignia
- The division's unique garrison cap insignia

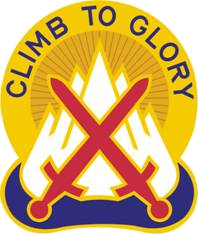
- Distinctive unit insignia of the Division's Headquarters Battalion

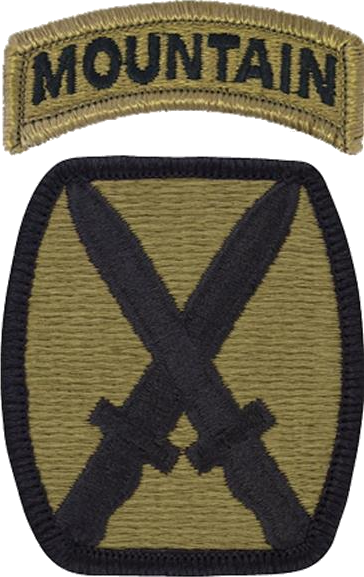
- Subdued shoulder sleeve insignia worn on OCP-ACU

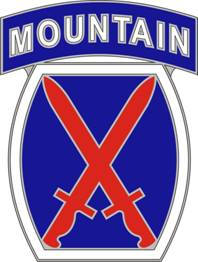
- Combat service identification badge

- Division flag
NATO Map Symbol
10

The 10th Mountain Division (Light Infantry) is a light infantry division in the United States Army based at Fort Drum, New York. Formerly designated as a mountain warfare unit, the division was the only one of its size in the U.S. military to receive specialized training for fighting in mountainous conditions.

Originally activated as the 10th Light Division (Alpine) in 1943, the division was redesignated the 10th Mountain Division in 1944 and fought in the mountains of Italy in some of the roughest terrain in World War II. On 5 May 1945, the division reached Nauders, Austria, just beyond Reschen Pass, where it made contact with Germans being pushed south by the U.S. Seventh Army. A status quo was maintained until the enemy headquarters involved had completed their surrender to the Seventh. On 6 May, 10th Mountain troops met the 44th Infantry Division of Seventh Army.

Following the war, the division was deactivated, only to be reactivated and redesignated as the 10th Infantry Division in 1948. The division first acted as a training division and, in 1954, was converted to a full combat division and, in 1955, was sent to Germany before being deactivated again in 1958.

Reactivated again in 1985, the division was designated the 10th Mountain Division (Light Infantry) to historically tie it to the World War II division and to also better describe its modern disposition. Since its reactivation, the division or elements of the division have deployed numerous times. The division has participated in Operation Desert Storm (Saudi Arabia), Hurricane Andrew disaster relief (Homestead, Florida), Operation Restore Hope and Operation Continue Hope (Somalia), Operation Uphold Democracy (Haiti), Operation Joint Forge (Bosnia and Herzegovina), Operation Joint Guardian (Kosovo), and several deployments as part of the Multinational Force and Observers (Sinai Peninsula).

The division was the first conventional unit of the US military to be deployed to Afghanistan following the September 11 attacks. Since then, the 10th Mountain Division has been the most deployed unit in the entire US military. Its combat brigades have seen over 30 deployments, to both Iraq and Afghanistan, in support of Operation Iraqi Freedom and Operation Enduring Freedom, as well as Syria and parts of Africa in support of Operation Inherent Resolve.

== History ==
=== Genesis of U.S. mountain troops ===
In November 1939, two months after World War II broke out in Europe, during the Soviet Union's invasion of Finland, Red Army efforts were frustrated following the destruction of two armored divisions by Finnish soldiers on skis. The conflict caught attention as the outnumbered and outgunned Finnish soldiers were able to use the difficult local terrain to their advantage, severely hampering the Soviet attacks and embarrassing their military. Upon seeing the effectiveness of these troops, Charles Minot "Minnie" Dole, the president of the National Ski Patrol, began to lobby the War Department of the need for a similar unit of troops in the United States Army, trained for fighting in winter and mountain warfare. In September 1940, Dole was able to present his case to General George C. Marshall, the Army Chief of Staff, who agreed with Dole's assessment, deciding to create a "Mountain" unit for fighting in harsh terrain. The U.S. Army authorized the formation of the platoon-sized Army Ski Patrol in November 1940. The first Patrol was formed at Camp Murray as part of the 41st Infantry Division under Lt. Ralph S. Phelps (later to become commanding General of the 41st). The army, prompted by fears that its standing forces would not perform well in the event of a winter attack on the Northeastern coast, as well as knowledge that the German Army already had three mountain warfare divisions known as Gebirgsjäger, approved the concept for a division. This required an overhaul of U.S. military doctrine, as the concept of winter warfare had not been tested in the army since 1914. At first, planners envisioned ten mountain divisions, but personnel shortages revised the goal to three. Eventually, the 10th Mountain Division would be the only one brought to active duty. Military leaders continued to express concern about the feasibility of a division-sized mountain warfare unit until the fall of 1941, when they received reports that Greek mountain troops had held back superior numbers of unprepared Italian troops in the Albanian mountains during the Greco-Italian War. The Italian military had lost a disastrous 25,000 men in the campaign because of their lack of preparedness to fight in the mountains. On 22 October 1941, General Marshall decided to form the first battalion of mountain warfare troops for a new mountain division. The Ski Patrol would assist in its training.

On 8 December 1941, the day after the Japanese attack on Pearl Harbor and the subsequent American entry into World War II, the army activated its first mountain unit, the 87th Mountain Infantry Battalion (which was later expanded to the 87th Infantry Regiment) at Fort Lewis, Washington, south of Tacoma. It was the first mountain warfare unit in U.S. military history. The National Ski Patrol took on the unique role of recruiting for the 87th Infantry Regiment and later the division, becoming the only civilian recruiting agency in military history. Army planners favored recruiting experienced skiers for the unit instead of trying to train standing troops in mountain warfare, so Dole recruited from schools, universities, and ski clubs for the unit. The 87th trained in harsh conditions, including Mount Rainier's 14,411-foot (4,392 m) peak, throughout 1942 as more recruits were brought in to form the division. Initial training was conducted by Olympian Rolf Monsen. A new garrison was built for the division in central Colorado at Camp Hale, at an elevation of 9,200 feet (2,800 m) above sea level.

=== World War II ===
The 10th Light Division (Alpine) was constituted on 10 July 1943 and activated in the Army of the United States five days later at Camp Hale under the command of Brigadier General Lloyd E. Jones, with Brigadier General Frank L. Culin Jr. assigned as his assistant division commander (ADC). The 10th Light Division was centered on regimental commands; the 85th, 86th, and 87th Infantry Regiments. At the time, the division had a strength of 8,500 out of the 16,000 planned, so the military transferred troops from the 30th, 31st, and 33rd Infantry Divisions along with volunteers from the National Guards of Maine, New Hampshire, Vermont and the rest of New England, New York, Pennsylvania, Virginia, West Virginia, Michigan, Wisconsin, Minnesota, Iowa, North and South Dakota, Colorado, Wyoming, Montana, Idaho, Utah and Washington (specifically, men who were from the Rocky Mountain and northern states such as men from in the Appalachian Mountain Area, Green Mountains of Vermont, White Mountains of New Hampshire, Adirondack and Taconic Mountains of New York and The Pocono Mountains of Pennsylvania and men from the areas in the United States close to the 45th parallel north), to fill out the remainder of the division. The division faced many difficulties in the new training, which had no established army doctrine. Also assigned to the division were the 604th, 605th, and 616th Field Artillery Battalions, 110th Signal Company, 710th Ordnance Company, 10th Quartermaster Company, 10th Reconnaissance Troop, 126th Engineer Battalion, 10th Medical Battalion, and the 10th Counterintelligence Corps Detachment. The 10th Light Division was unique in that it was the only division in the army with three field artillery battalions instead of four. It was equipped with vehicles specialized in snow operation, such as the M29 Weasel, and winter weather gear, such as white camouflage and skis specifically designed for the division.

The division practiced its rock climbing skills in preparation for the invasion of Italy on the challenging peaks of Seneca Rocks in West Virginia. Its specialized training culminated with what were known as the "D-Series" ("D" for "Divisional"), military maneuvers on the divisional level in the Colorado Rockies in Winter conditions. Beginning 26 March 1944, the exercises were intended to last five weeks. The soldiers endured an adverse environment, and "tactical conditions" that banned open fires in sub-zero temperatures. As a result, the exercises were ended after 3 weeks. Official statistics recorded 195 cases of frostbite and 340 other incapacitating injuries.

On 22 June 1944, the division was shipped to Camp Swift, Texas, to prepare for maneuvers in Louisiana, which were later canceled. A period of acclimation to a low altitude and hot climate was thought necessary to prepare for this training. On 6 November 1944, the 10th Division was redesignated the 10th Mountain Division. That same month, the blue and white "Mountain" tab was authorized for the division's new shoulder sleeve insignia. Also in November, the division received a new commander, Brigadier General George Price Hays, a Medal of Honor recipient and a distinguished veteran of World War I. On January 4, 1945, he received a promotion to major general.

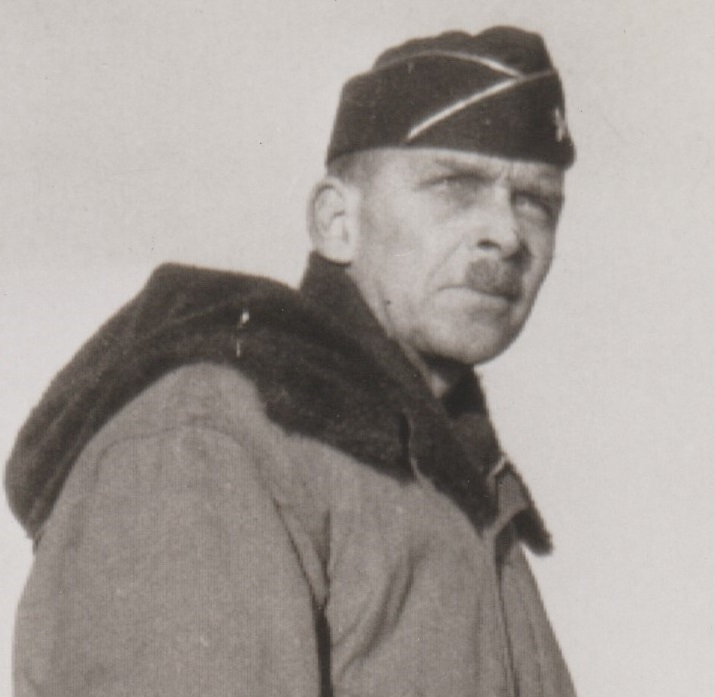
Brigadier General Lloyd E. Jones observes troops land at Amchitka Island during the Aleutians Campaign, shortly before assuming command of the 10th Light Division.

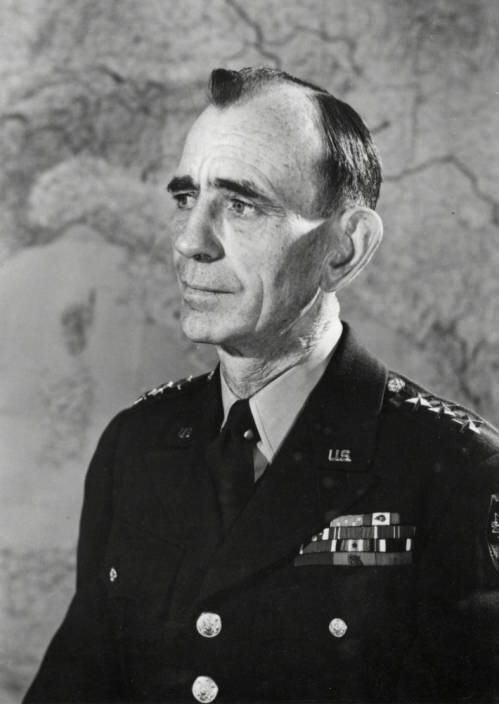
Lt. Gen. George P. Hays assumed command after Jones fell ill in 1944.

==== Italy ====
The division sailed for the Italian front in two parts, with the 86th Infantry and support leaving Camp Patrick Henry, Virginia on 11 December 1944 aboard the SS Argentina and arriving in Naples, Italy on 22 December. The 85th and 87th Infantry left Hampton Roads, Virginia on 4 January 1945 aboard the SS West Point and arrived on 13 January 1945. By 6 January, its support units were preparing to head to the front lines. It was attached to Major General Willis D. Crittenberger's IV Corps, part of the American Fifth Army, commanded by Lieutenant General Lucian Truscott. By 8 January, the 86th Infantry had moved to Bagni di Lucca near Mount Belvedere in preparation for an offensive by the Fifth Army to capture the mountain along with surrounding high ground, which allowed the Axis to block advances to Po Valley. Starting 14 January, the division began moving to Pisa as part of the Fifth Army massing for this attack.

By 20 January, all three of the 10th's regiments were on or near the front line between the Serchio Valley and Mt. Belvedere. Col. Raymond C. Barlow commanded the 85th Regiment, Col. Clarence M. Tomlinson the 86th, and Col. David M. Fowler the 87th.

Preliminary defensive actions in mid-February were followed by Operation Encore, a series of attacks in conjunction with troops of the 1st Brazilian Infantry Division, to dislodge the Germans from their artillery positions in the Northern Apennines on the border between Tuscany and Emilia-Romagna regions, in order to make possible the Allied advance over the Po Valley. While the Brazilian division was in charge of taking Monte Castello and Castelnuovo di Vergato, the 10th Mountain Division was responsible for the Mount Belvedere area, climbing nearby Riva Ridge during the night of 18 February and attacking Mount della Torraccia on 20 February. These peaks were cleared after four days of heavy fighting, as Axis troops launched several counterattacks in these positions.

In early March, the division fought its way north of Canolle and moved to within 15 miles (24 km) of Bologna. On 5 March, while Brazilian units captured Castelnuovo, the 85th and the 87th Infantry took respectively Mount Della Spe and Castel D'Aiano, cutting the Axis routes of resupply and communication into the Po Valley, setting the stage for the next Fifth Army offensive. The division maintained defensive positions in this area for three weeks, anticipating a counteroffensive by the Germans.

==== Lake Garda operations and the end of combat ====
In the final days of April 1945, as German defenses in northern Italy collapsed, the 10th Mountain Division advanced north toward Lake Garda in pursuit of retreating s. The difficult terrain and destroyed infrastructure around the lake required the use of amphibious DUKW vehicles for transport and assault. On the night of 30 April, one such vehicle carrying 25 soldiers sank during the crossing, resulting in one of the last and most tragic losses of the Italian campaign. That same day, the division's newly appointed Assistant Commander, Colonel William Orlando Darby—founder of the U.S. Army Rangers—was killed by artillery fire in Torbole, together with Sergeant Major John T. Evans. The events at Lake Garda marked the final combat actions for the 10th Mountain Division in Europe and have since become a lasting symbol of the cost of liberation.

The division resumed its attack on 14 April 1945, pressing forward on multiple axes. That day it assaulted Torre Iussi and Rocca Roffeno, north of Mount Della Spe. After stiff fighting, on 17 April it broke through the German Gothic Line defenses, opening the way into the Po Valley. Over the next days the advance continued: on 20 April the 10th captured Mongiorgio and pushed into the Po plain, taking key positions at Pradalbino and Bomporto. The division crossed the Po River at San Benedetto Po on 23 April, reached Verona on 25 April, and encountered heavy resistance in the areas of Torbole and Nago.

Because the routes around Lake Garda had been rendered impassable by destroyed tunnels and bridges, the division carried out an amphibious crossing of the lake using DUKW vehicles. On 30 April it secured Gargnano and Porto di Tremosine on the western shore, effectively ending organized German resistance in northern Italy.

That same night, however, a tragic accident occurred. During a night operation to transport troops and equipment across Lake Garda from Torbole toward the northern shore, one DUKW carrying 25 men of the 10th Mountain Division sank in deep water during rough weather. The vehicle, heavily loaded with men, a 75 mm pack howitzer, ammunition, and gear, began taking on water and foundered before rescue could reach it. Only one soldier, Corporal Thomas E. Hough, survived; the others were declared Missing in Action (MIA) and remain unaccounted for.

The site of the sinking remained unknown for decades, despite repeated efforts by the U.S. Army, local divers, and underwater archaeology teams. In 2012, after several unsuccessful surveys, the Italian volunteer rescue group Volontari del Garda located the wreck upright on the lakebed using sonar and remotely operated vehicles.

On the same day, 30 April 1945, the division also suffered the loss of its Assistant Division Commander, Colonel William O. Darby, founder of the U.S. Army Rangers. While in Torbole on the northern shore of Lake Garda, Darby was killed by an enemy artillery shell explosion along with his Sergeant Major, John T. Evans, and another soldier was wounded. Darby had been appointed to the division only days earlier, following the wounding of Brigadier General Robinson E. Duff, and was directing the final movements of the divisions advance when he was struck by shrapnel. His death came just hours before the announcement of the German surrender in Italy.

After the German capitulation on 2 May 1945, the division shifted to security and occupation duties. On 5 May it reached Nauders, Austria, just beyond the Reschen Pass, where it linked up with elements of the U.S. 44th Infantry Division. Between 2 May and Victory in Europe Day (8 May), the 10th Mountain Division accepted the surrender of German units and secured key areas in northeastern Italy and western Slovenia. By 20 May it had redeployed to Udine, joining the British Eighth Army to prevent further westward movement of Yugoslav troops.

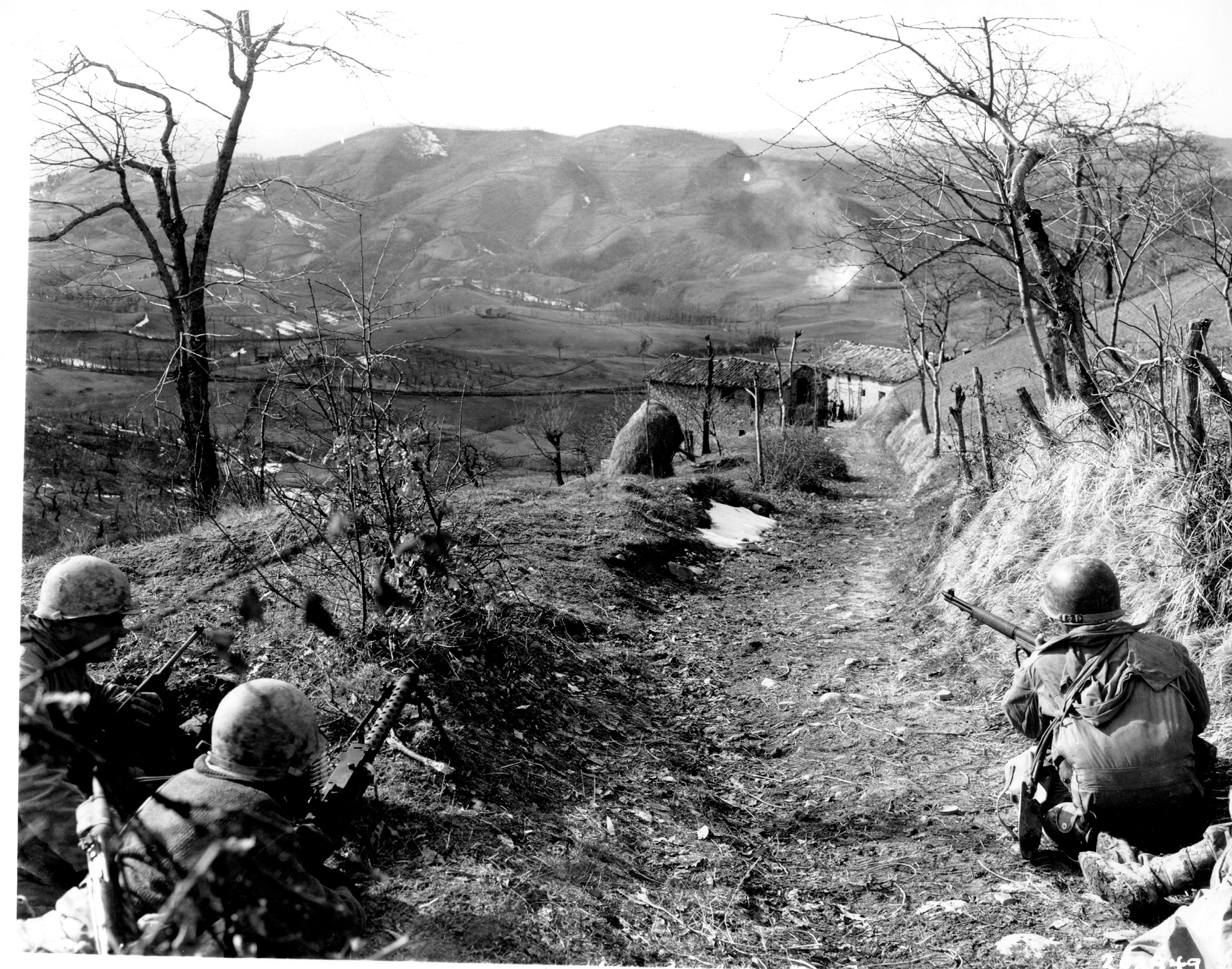
A machine gunner and two riflemen of Company "K" of the 87th Mountain Infantry Regiment, 10th Mountain Division, cover an assault squad routing Germans out of a building in the background. Porretta-Modena Highway, Sassomolare Area, Italy, March 4, 1945.

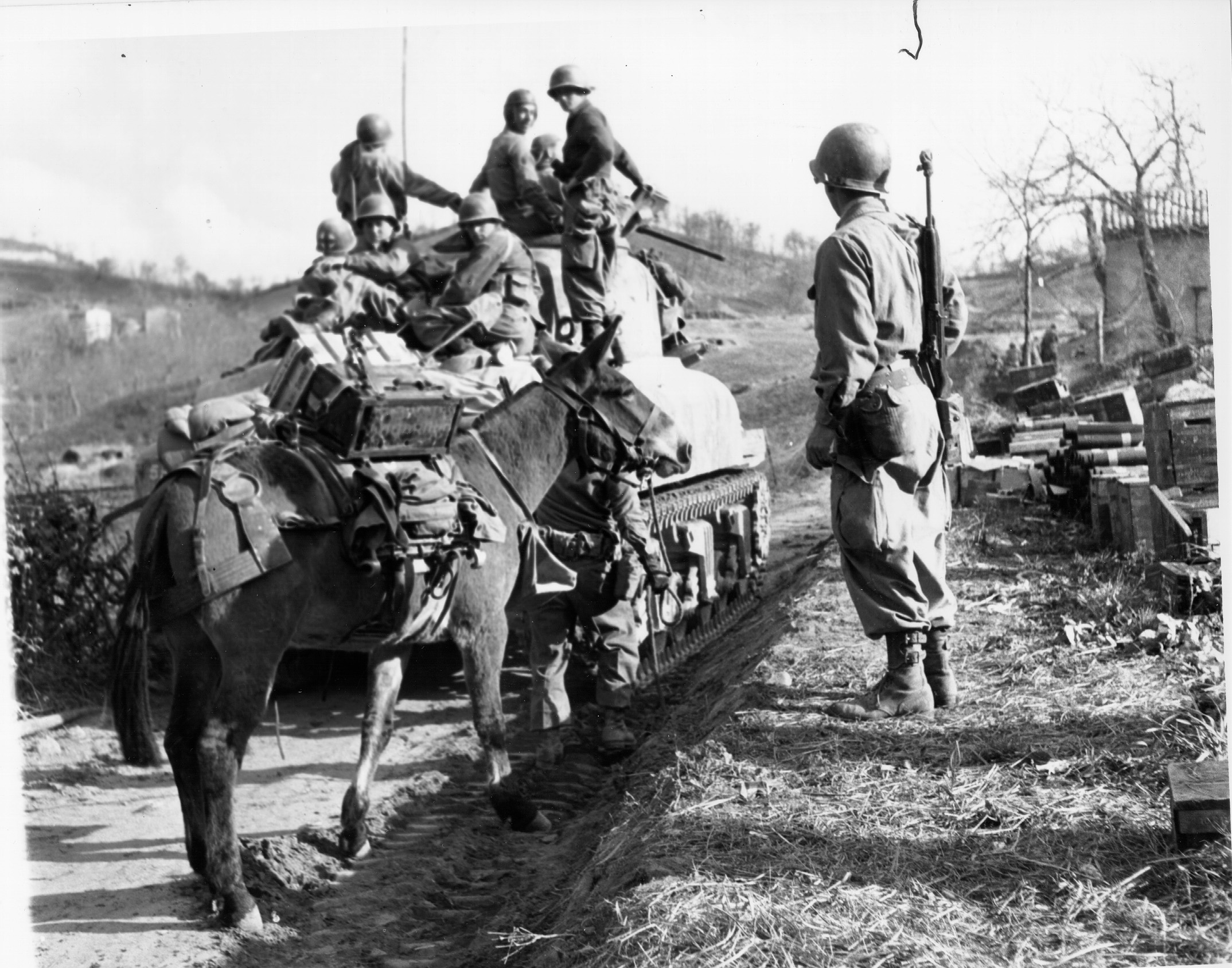
Elements of the 10th Mountain Division advancing in Italy in April 1945.

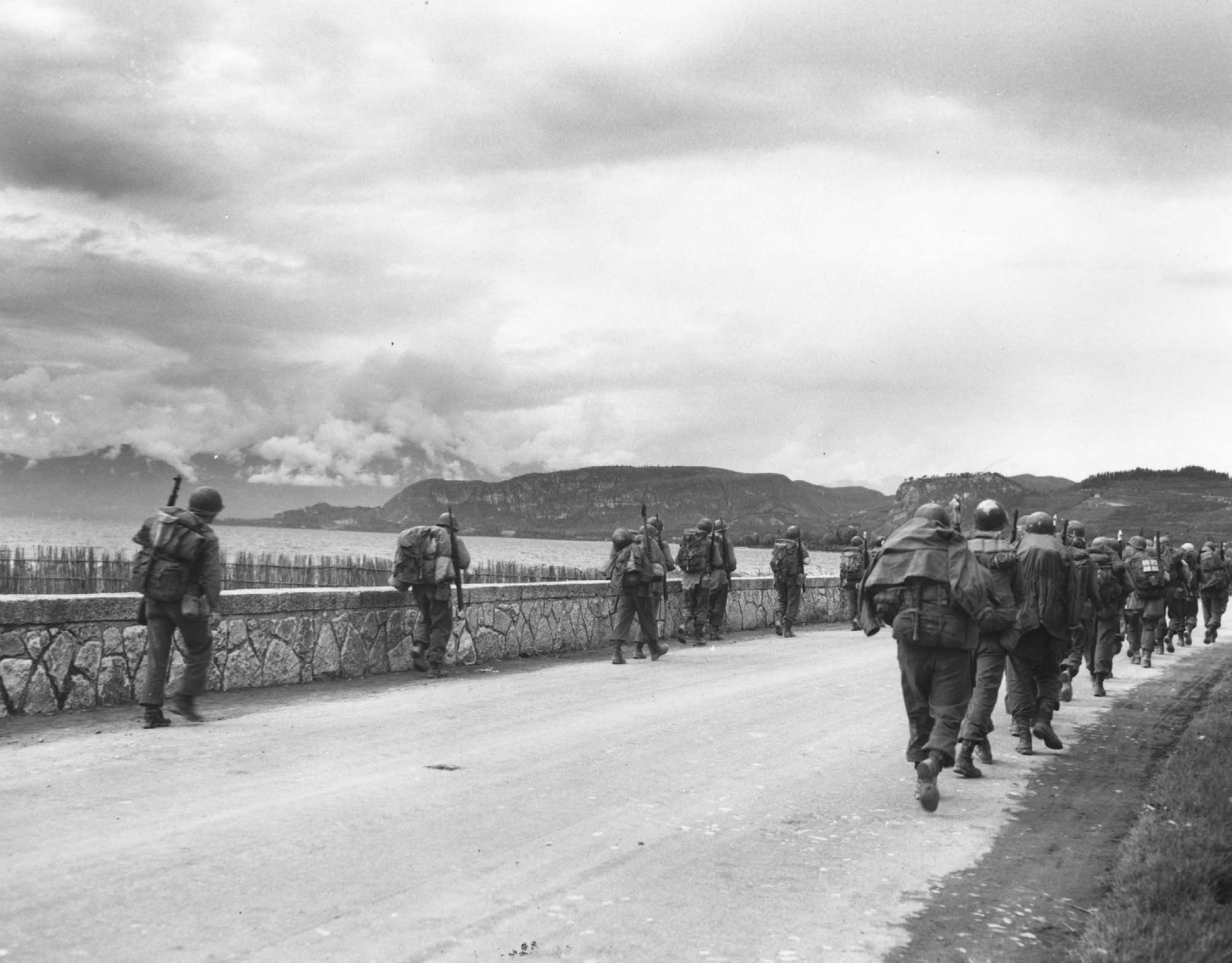
Members of the 86th Infantry Regiment, 10th Mountain Division, march north, near Malcesine, on Lake Garda, April 29, 1945.

==== Division organization ====
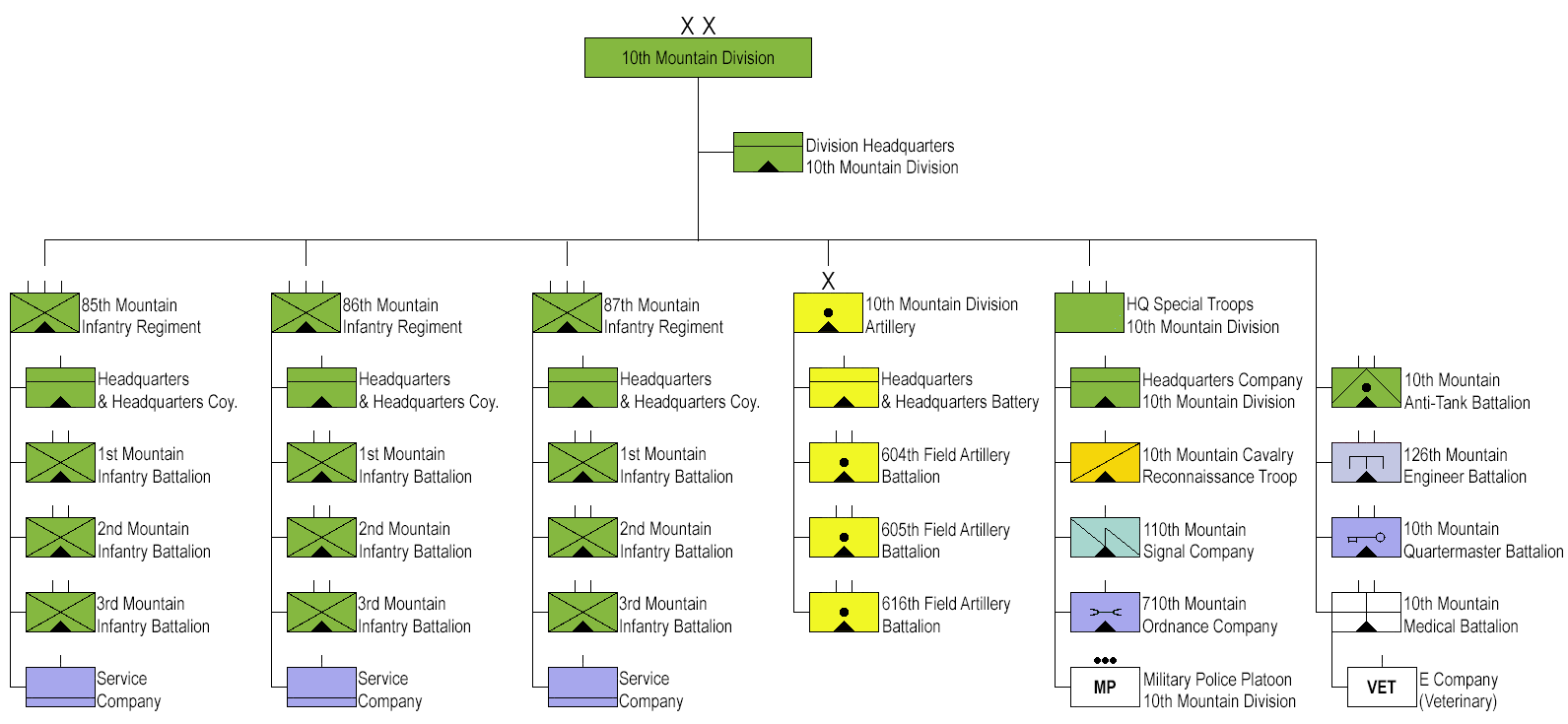
10th Mountain Division WWII organization (click to enlarge)

The 10th Mountain Division was composed of the following units:

- 10th Mountain Division
  - Division Headquarters
  - 85th Mountain Infantry Regiment
    - Headquarters and Headquarters Company
    - 3× Mountain infantry battalions
      - each battalion consists of: 1× Headquarters and Headquarters Company, 3× Rifle companies, 1× Weapons Company
    - Service Company
  - 86th Mountain Infantry Regiment
    - same organization as 85th Mountain Infantry Regiment
  - 87th Mountain Infantry Regiment
    - same organization as 85th Mountain Infantry Regiment
  - 10th Mountain Division Artillery
    - Headquarters and Headquarters Battery
    - 604th Field Artillery Battalion
      - Headquarters and Headquarters Battery
      - 3× Batteries (M1 75mm pack howitzers)
      - Service Battery
    - 605th Field Artillery Battalion
      - same organization as 604th Field Artillery Battalion
    - 616th Field Artillery Battalion
      - same organization as 604th Field Artillery Battalion
  - Headquarters Special Troops
    - Headquarters Company, 10th Mountain Division
    - 10th Mountain Cavalry Reconnaissance Troop
    - 110th Mountain Signal Company
    - 710th Ordnance Company
    - Military Police Platoon
  - 10th Mountain Anti-Tank Battalion
    - Headquarters and Headquarters Company
    - 2× Anti-Tank companies (M1 57mm anti-tank guns)
  - 126th Mountain Engineer Battalion
    - Headquarters and Headquarters Company
    - 3× Engineer companies
    - 1× Motorized engineer company
  - 10th Supply Battalion
    - Headquarters and Headquarters Company
    - 3× Mule companies
    - 1× Truck company
  - 10th Mountain Medical Battalion
    - Headquarters and Headquarters Company
    - 4× Medical companies (partially detached to the division's regiments and the division's artillery)
    - E Company (Veterinary)

==== Attached units ====
Attached to the 10th Mountain Division for the entire duration of combat operations in Italy in 1945:

- 84th Chemical Mortar Battalion: 17 February — 3 May with 4.2-inch (107 mm) chemical mortars
- 175th Field Artillery Battalion: 15 February — 16 March
- 235th Engineer Combat Battalion: 20 February — 3 May
- 1125th Armored Field Artillery Battalion: 15 February — 3 May with M7 Priest self propelled howitzers
- B Company, 701st Tank Destroyer Battalion: 17 February — 16 July with M10 tank destroyers
- 37th Quartermaster War Dog Platoon: 17 February — 3 May

Attached to the 10th Mountain Division temporarily during combat operations in Italy in 1945:

- 1st Battalion, Brazilian Expeditionary Force: 26 February — 28 February
- 1st Battalion, 365th Infantry Regiment, 92nd Infantry Division: 28 March — 9 April
- 13th Tank Battalion, 1st Armored Division: 23 April — 3 May
- 91st Cavalry Reconnaissance Squadron: 19 April — 22 April
- 178th (Lowland) Medium Regiment, Royal Artillery: 12 April — 3 May with 5.5-inch guns
- 328th Field Artillery Battalion, 85th Infantry Division Artillery: 10 April — 17 April
- 403rd Field Artillery Battalion, 85th Infantry Division Artillery: 10 April — 17 April
- 910th Field Artillery Battalion, 85th Infantry Division Artillery: 10 April — 17 April
- 751st Tank Battalion: 17 February — 17 April
- A Company, 760th Tank Battalion: 17 February — 7 March
- C Company, 894th Tank Destroyer Battalion: 19 February — 6 April

==== Casualties ====
- Total battle casualties: 4,072
- Killed in action: 992
- Wounded in action: 3,134
- Missing in action: 38
- Prisoners of war: 28

==== Demobilization ====
In July, the Department of War assigned the 10th Mountain to the Pacific theater; after a month's furlough the men would assemble at Camp Carson, where they would train for Operation Downfall, the invasion of mainland Japan. Between 26 July and 2 August the three regiments boarded ships for the return voyage to the United States; the day before the first of these regiments, the 86th Mountain Infantry, disembarked at Hampton Roads, Hiroshima was leveled by an atom bomb. Three days after the rest of the division landed stateside on 11 August, Japan officially surrendered. The division was demobilized and inactivated on 30 November 1945 at Camp Carson, Colorado.

During World War II, the 10th Mountain Division suffered 992 killed in action and 4,154 wounded in action in 114 days of combat. Soldiers of the division were awarded one Medal of Honor (John D. Magrath), three Distinguished Service Crosses, one Distinguished Service Medal, 449 Silver Star Medals, seven Legion of Merit Medals, 15 Soldier's Medals, and 7,729 Bronze Star Medals. The division itself was awarded two campaign streamers.

=== Legacy of World War II service ===
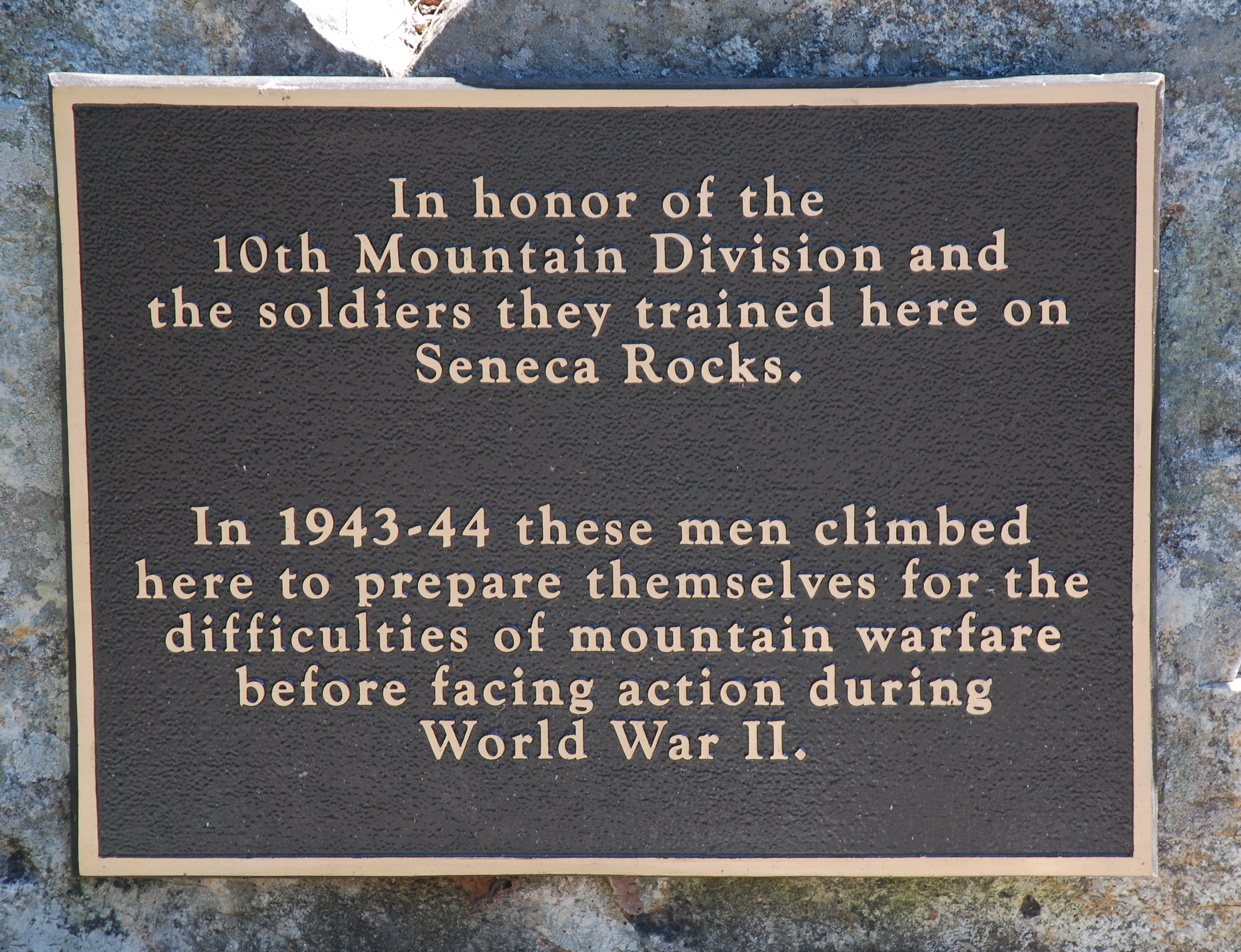
Plaque in honor of 10th Mountain Division at Seneca Rocks, WV.

Skiing associations subsequently contend that veterans of the 10th Mountain Division had a substantial effect on the post–World War II development of skiing as a vacation industry and major sport. Ex-soldiers from the 10th laid out ski hills, designed ski lifts, became ski coaches, racers, instructors, patrollers, shop owners, and filmmakers. They wrote and published ski magazines, opened ski schools, improved ski equipment, and developed ski resorts. Up to 2,000 of the division's troops were involved in skiing-related professions after the war, and at least 60 ski resorts were founded by men of the division. As Maurice Isserman notes in his book The Winter Army, "The 10th Mountain Division was the only unit in the history of the US military to use wartime skills to promote a civilian pastime."

People associated with the 10th Mountain Division later went on to achieve notability in other fields. Among these are anthropologist Eric Wolf, mathematician Franz Alt, avalanche researcher and forecasting pioneer Montgomery Atwater, Congressman Les AuCoin, mountaineer and teacher who helped develop equipment for the 10th Mountain Robert Bates, noted mountaineer Fred Beckey, United States Ski Team member and Black Mountain of Maine resort co-founder Chummy Broomhall, former American track and field coach and co-founder of Nike, Inc. Bill Bowerman, former executive director and Sierra Club leader David R. Brower, former United States Ski Team member World War II civilian mountaineer trainer H. Adams Carter, former Senate Majority Leader and Presidential Bob Dole, champion skier Dick Durrance, ski resort pioneer John Elvrum, Norwegian-American skier Sverre Engen, fashion illustrator Joe Eula, Olympic equestrian Earl Foster Thomson, civilian founder of the National Ski Patrol Charles Minot Dole, painter Gino Hollander, Paleoclimatologist John Imbrie, theoretical physicist Francis E. Low, US downhill ski champion Toni Matt, falconer and educator Morley Nelson, comic book artist Earl Norem, founder of National Outdoor Leadership School and The Wilderness Education Association Paul Petzoldt, world downhill ski champion Walter Prager, demolition derby driver Joshua Tagliaboschi, retired broadcasting executive William Lowell Putnam III, Massachusetts Governor Francis W. Sargent, World War II civilian ski instructor and division trainer Hannes Schneider, founder of Vail Ski Resort Pete Seibert, actor and Olympic medalist Floyd Simmons, historian and author Page Smith, members of the famous von Trapp family singers Werner von Trapp and Rupert von Trapp, Rawleigh Warner, Jr., chairman and CEO of Mobil, civilian technical adviser Fritz Wiessner, William John Wolfgram, Olympic Ski jumper Gordon Wren, Massachusetts Congressional Nathan Bech, leader of Chalk 4 during the Battle of Mogadishu Matt Eversmann, Middle East analyst, blogger, and author Andrew Exum, and author Craig Mullaney.

Additionally, five members of the division have been awarded the Medal of Honor. In 1945 John D. Magrath became the first member of the division to receive this award (posthumously) during World War II. The second, Jared C. Monti, received it posthumously in 2009, for actions during a combat operation on 21 June 2006 in Afghanistan. The third, William D. Swenson, received it in 2013, for actions on 8 September 2009, during the Battle of Ganjgal in Afghanistan. The fourth, Travis W. Atkins, received it posthumously on 27 March 2019, for actions on 1 June 2007 during a patrol in Iraq. The fifth, Michael Ollis, received it posthumously on 2 March 2026, for actions on 28 August 2013 during an attack in Afghanistan.

=== Cold War ===
In June 1948, the division was rebuilt and activated at Fort Riley, Kansas to serve as a training division. Without its "Mountain" tab, the division served as the 10th Infantry Division for the next ten. The unit was charged with processing and training replacements in large numbers. This mission was expanded with the outbreak of the Korean War in 1950. By 1953, the division had trained 123,000 new Army recruits at Fort Riley.

In 1954, the division was converted to a combat division once again, though it did not regain its "Mountain" status. Using equipment from the deactivating 37th Infantry Division, the 10th Infantry Division was deployed to Germany in 1955, replacing the 1st Infantry Division at Würzburg, serving as part of the North Atlantic Treaty Organization (NATO) defensive. The division served in Germany for four, until it was rotated out and replaced by the 3rd Infantry Division. The division moved to Fort Benning, Georgia, and was inactivated on 14 June 1958.

==== Reactivation ====
On 13 February 1985, the 10th Mountain Division (Light Infantry) was reactivated at Fort Drum, New York. In accordance with the Reorganization Objective Army Divisions plan, the division was no longer centered on regiments, instead two brigades were activated under the division. The 1st Brigade, 10th Mountain Division (commanded by then Colonel John M. Keane, later 4-Star General and Army Vice Chief of Staff) and Division Artillery were activated at Fort Drum, while the 2nd Brigade, 10th Mountain Division was activated at Fort Benning, moving to Fort Drum in 1988. The division was also assigned a round-out brigade from the Army National Guard, the 27th Infantry Brigade. The division was specially designed as a light infantry division able to rapidly deploy. In this process, it lost its mountain warfare capability, but its light infantry organization still made it versatile for difficult terrain. Equipment design was oriented toward reduced size and weight for reasons of both strategic and tactical mobility. The division also received a distinctive unit insignia.

===== Division organization 1989 =====
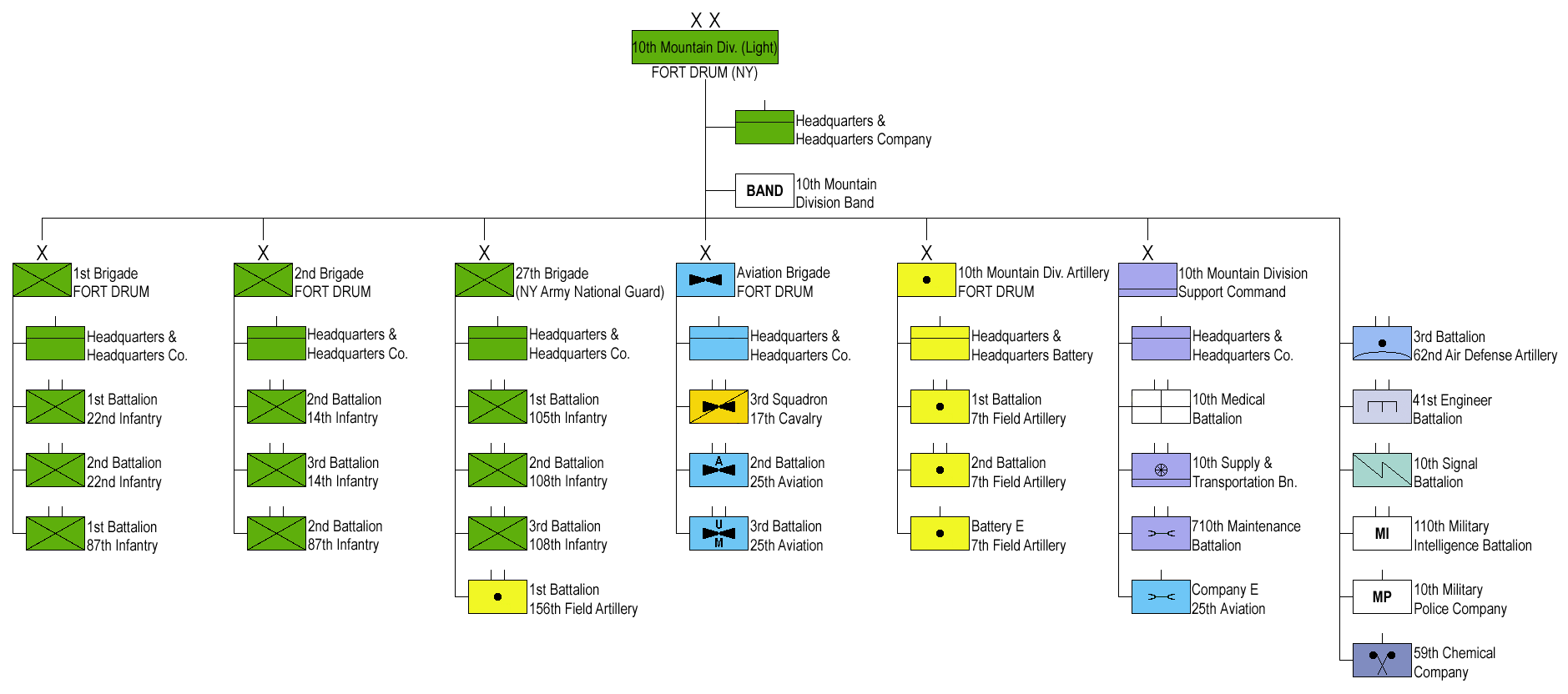
10th Mountain Division (Light) 1989 (click to enlarge)

At the end of the Cold War, the division was organized as follows:

- 10th Mountain Division (Light), Fort Drum, New York
  - Headquarters & Headquarters Company
  - 1st Brigade
    - Headquarters & Headquarters Company
    - 1st Battalion, 22nd Infantry
    - 2nd Battalion, 22nd Infantry
    - 1st Battalion, 87th Infantry
  - 2nd Brigade
    - Headquarters & Headquarters Company
    - 2nd Battalion, 14th Infantry
    - 3rd Battalion, 14th Infantry
    - 2nd Battalion, 87th Infantry
  - 27th Infantry Brigade (Light), Syracuse (New York Army National Guard)
    - Headquarters & Headquarters Company
    - 1st Battalion, 108th Infantry, Auburn
    - 2nd Battalion, 108th Infantry, Syracuse
    - 3rd Battalion, 108th Infantry, Utica
    - 1st Battalion, 156th Field Artillery, Kingston, (18 × M101 105 mm towed howitzer)
    - 427th Support Battalion (Forward), Syracuse
    - Troop E, 101st Cavalry, Buffalo
    - 827th Engineer Company, Buffalo
  - Aviation Brigade
    - Headquarters & Headquarters Company
    - 3rd Squadron, 17th Cavalry (Reconnaissance)
    - 2nd Battalion, 25th Aviation (Attack)
    - Company C, 25th Aviation (General Support)
    - Company D, 25th Aviation (Assault)
  - Division Artillery
    - Headquarters & Headquarters Battery
    - 1st Battalion, 7th Field Artillery (18 × M101 105 mm towed howitzer)
    - 2nd Battalion, 7th Field Artillery (18 × M101 105 mm towed howitzer)
    - Battery E, 7th Field Artillery (8 × M198 155 mm towed howitzer)
  - Division Support Command
    - Headquarters & Headquarters Company
    - 10th Medical Battalion
    - 10th Supply & Transportation Battalion
    - 710th Maintenance Battalion
    - Company E, 25th Aviation (Aviation Intermediate Maintenance)
  - 3rd Battalion, 62nd Air Defense Artillery
  - 41st Engineer Battalion
  - 10th Battalion
  - 110th Military Intelligence Battalion
  - 10th Military Police Company
  - 59th Chemical Company
  - 10th Mountain Division Band

=== Contingencies ===
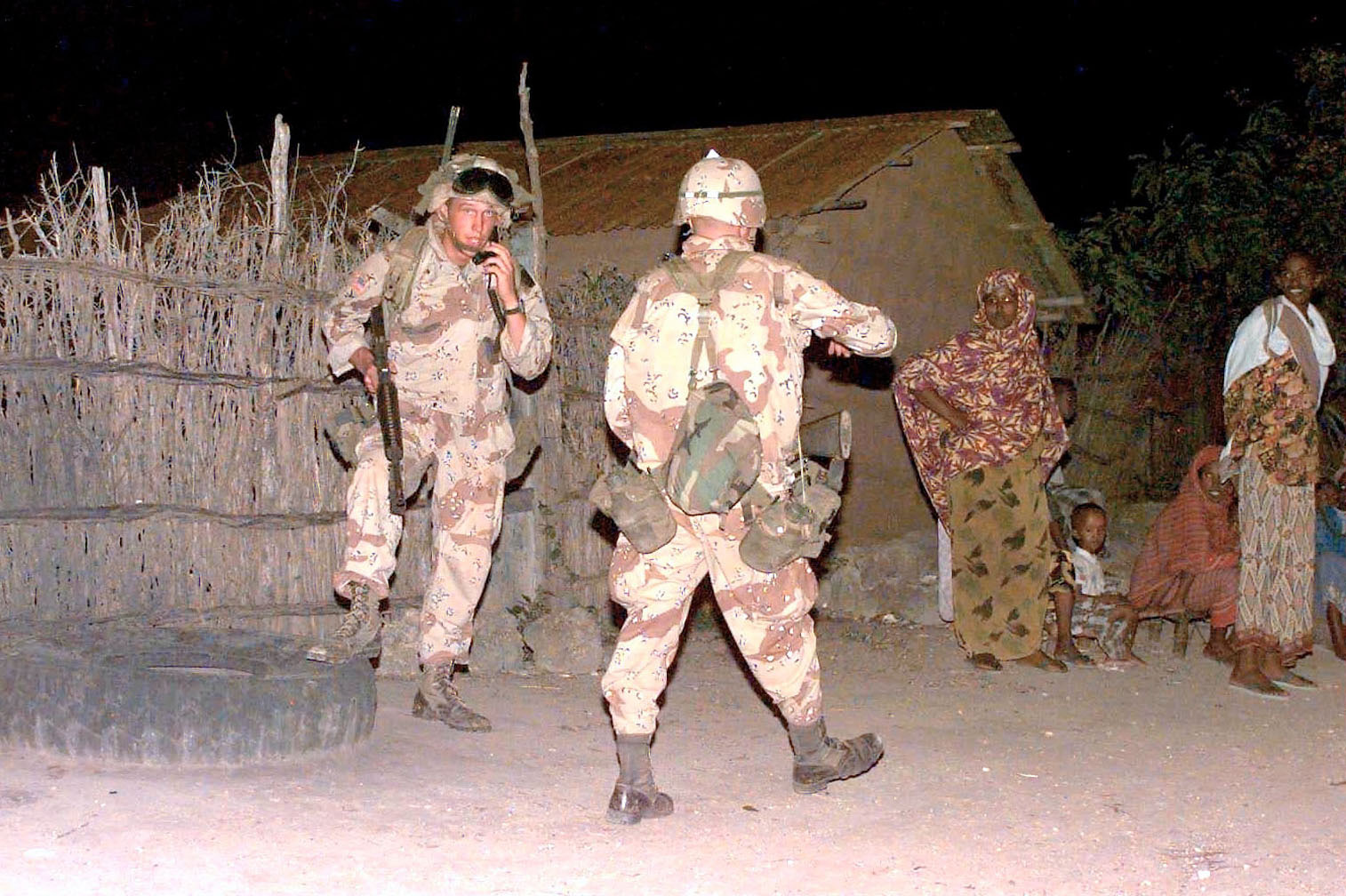
Soldiers of the 10th Mountain Division sweep a Somali village for weapons in 1993.

In 1990, the division sent 1,200 soldiers to support Operation Desert Storm. Two infantry platoons from the division were among those sent: 1st Platoon Bravo Company 1/22 and the 1/22 Scout Platoon. Once in Iraq, the scouts were sent home and First Platoon was left as a counterintelligence. Performing three-man 24hr patrols through the remainder of their deployment, this platoon was widely regarded as the division's best at that time. Following a cease-fire in March 1991, the support soldiers began redeploying to Fort Drum through June of that year.

Hurricane Andrew struck South Florida on 24 August 1992, killing 13 people, leaving another 250,000 homeless, and causing damages in excess of $20 billion. On 27 August 1992, the 10th Mountain Division assumed responsibility for Hurricane Andrew disaster relief as Task Mountain. Division soldiers set up relief camps, distributed food, clothing, medical necessities, and building supplies, as well as helping to homes and clear debris. The last of the 6,000 division soldiers deployed to Florida returned home in October 1992.

==== Operation Restore Hope ====
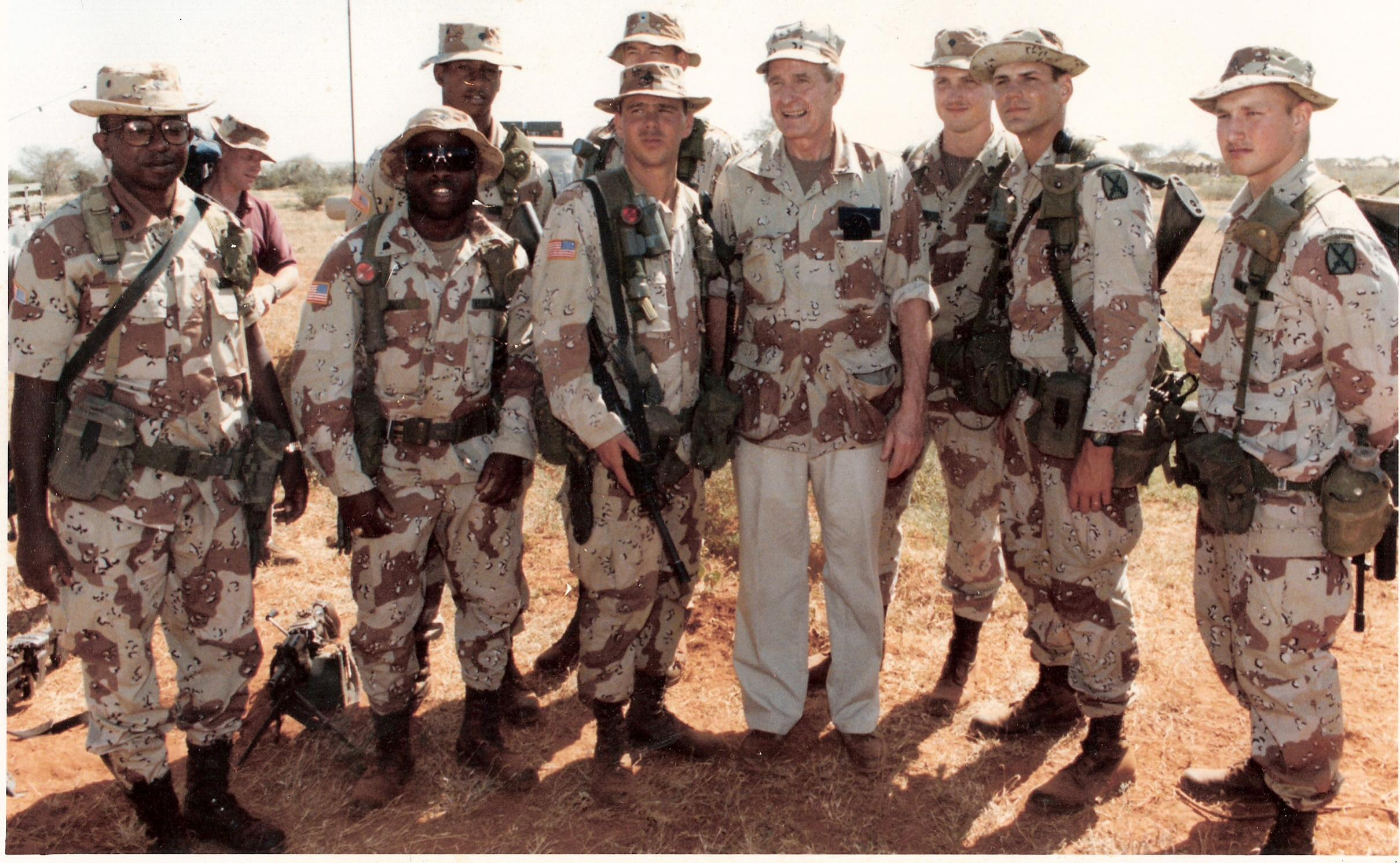
Members of the 10th Mountain Division with President George H. W. Bush, January 1993.

On 3 December 1992, the division headquarters was designated as the headquarters for all Army s (ARFOR) of the Unified Task (UNITAF) for Operation Restore Hope. Major General Steven L. Arnold, the division Commander, was named Army s commander. The 10th Mountain Division's mission was to secure major cities and roads to provide safe passage of relief supplies to the Somali population suffering from the effects of the Somali Civil War.

Due to 10th Mountain Division efforts, humanitarian agencies declared an end to the food emergency and factional fighting decreased. When Task Ranger and the SAR team were pinned down during a raid in what later became known as the Battle of Mogadishu, the 10th Mountain Division provided infantry for the UN quick reaction sent to rescue them. The 10th Mountain Division had two soldiers killed in the fighting, which was the longest sustained firefight by regular U.S. Army s since the Vietnam War. The division began a gradual reduction of s in Somalia in February 1994, until the last soldiers of the 2nd Battalion, 22nd Infantry returned to the United States in March 1994.

==== Operation Uphold Democracy ====
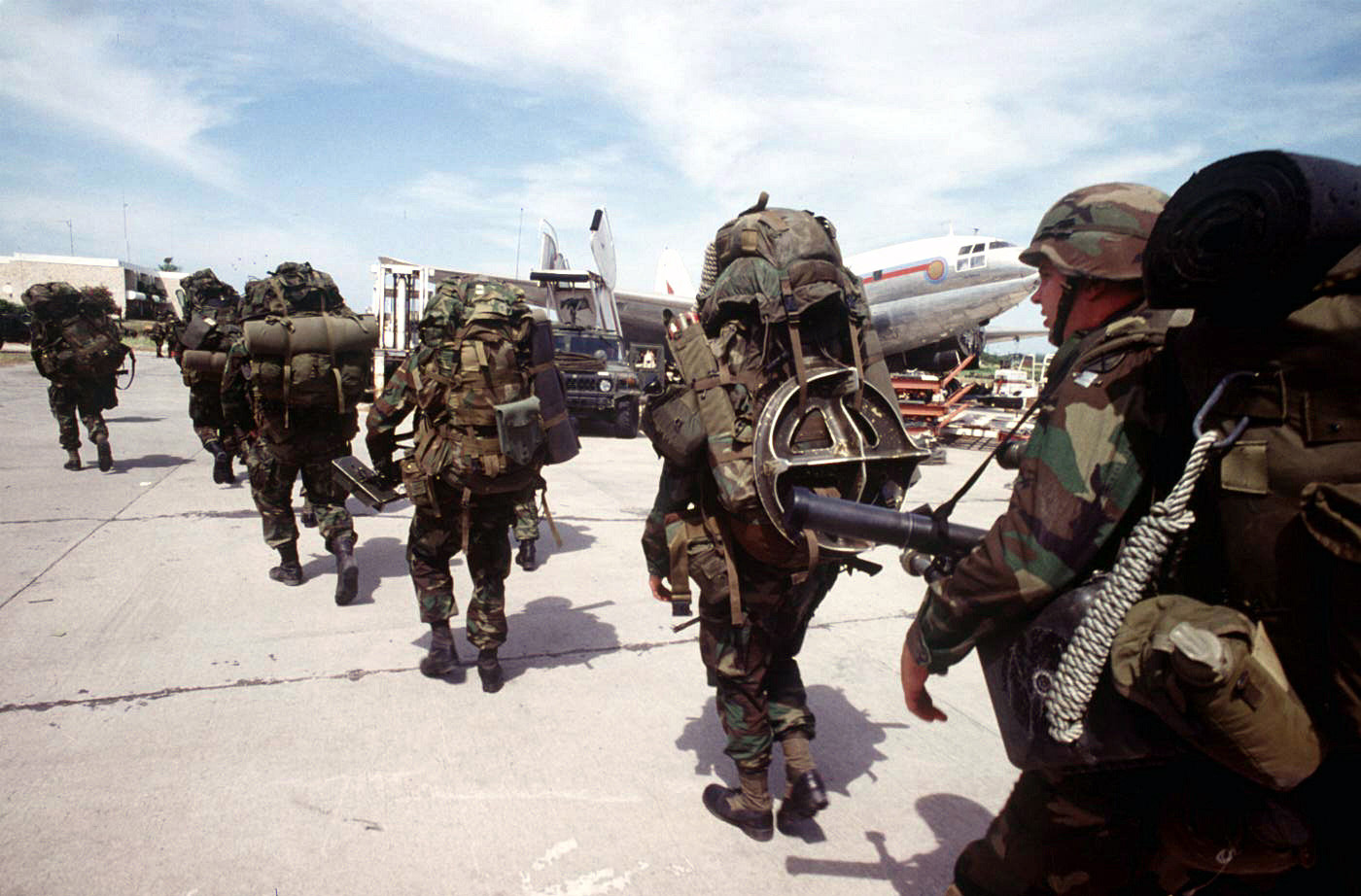
Soldiers of the 10th Mountain Division secure Port-au-Prince International Airport in 1994.

The division formed the nucleus of the Multinational Haiti (MNF Haiti) and Joint Task 190 (JTF 190) in Haiti during Operation Uphold Democracy. More than 8,600 of the division's troops deployed during this operation. On 19 September 1994, the 1st Brigade conducted the Army's first air assault from aircraft carrier USS Dwight D. Eisenhower. This consisted of 54 helicopters and almost 2,000 soldiers. They occupied the Port-au-Prince International Airport. This was the largest Army air operation conducted from a carrier since the Doolittle Raid in World War II.

The division's mission was to create a secure and stable environment so the government of Haitian President Jean-Bertrand Aristide could be reestablished and democratic s held. After this was accomplished, the 10th Mountain Division handed over control of the MNF-Haiti to the 25th Infantry Division on 15 January 1995. The division redeployed the last of its soldiers who served in Haiti by 31 January 1995.

==== Operation Joint Forge ====
In the fall of 1998, the division received notice that it would be serving as senior headquarters of Task Eagle, providing a peacekeeping to support the ongoing operation within the Multi-National Division-North area of responsibility in Bosnia and Herzegovina. Selected division units began deploying in late summer, approximately 3,000 division soldiers deployed. After performing their mission in Bosnia, the division units conducted a transfer of authority, relinquishing their assignments to soldiers of the 49th Armored Division, Texas National Guard. By early summer 2000, all 10th Mountain Division soldiers had returned safely to Fort Drum.

==== Readiness controversy ====
During the 2000 presidential, the readiness of the 10th Mountain Division became a political issue when George W. Bush asserted that the division was "not ready for duty." He attributed the division's low readiness to the frequent deployments throughout the 1990s without time in between for division elements to retrain and refit. A report from the U.S. General Accounting Office in July 2000 also noted that although the entire 10th Mountain Division was not deployed to the contingencies at once, "deployment of key components—especially headquarters—makes these divisions unavailable for deployment elsewhere in case of a major war". Conservative think tank The Heritage Foundation agreed with these sentiments, charging that the U.S. military overall was not prepared for war due to post–Cold War drawdowns of the U.S. military. The Army responded that, though the 10th Mountain Division had been unprepared following its deployment as Task Eagle, that the unit was fully prepared for combat by late 2000 despite being undermanned. Still, the Army moved the 10th Mountain Division down on the deployment list, allowing it time to retrain and refit.

In 2002, columnist and highly decorated military veteran David Hackworth again criticized the 10th Mountain Division for being unprepared due to lack of training, low physical fitness, unprepared leadership, and low morale. He said the division was no longer capable of mountain warfare.

These concerns were quickly debunked as the 10th Mountain Division was the first conventional unit in the entire US military to be deployed to Afghanistan, seeing heavy combat.

=== Afghanistan and Iraq ===
==== Initial deployments and 2004 reorganization ====
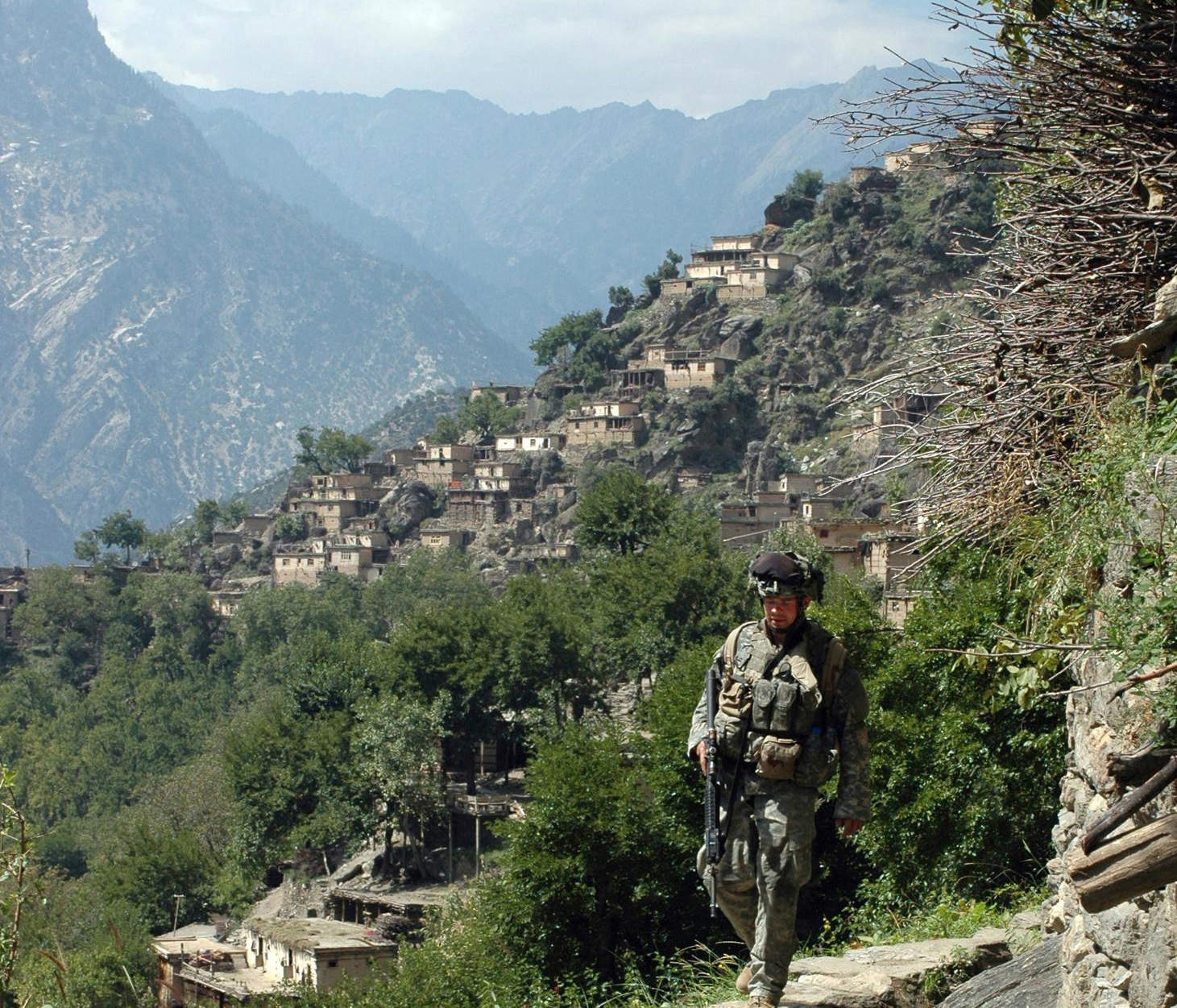
10th Mountain soldier on patrol in Afghanistan's Nuristan Province.

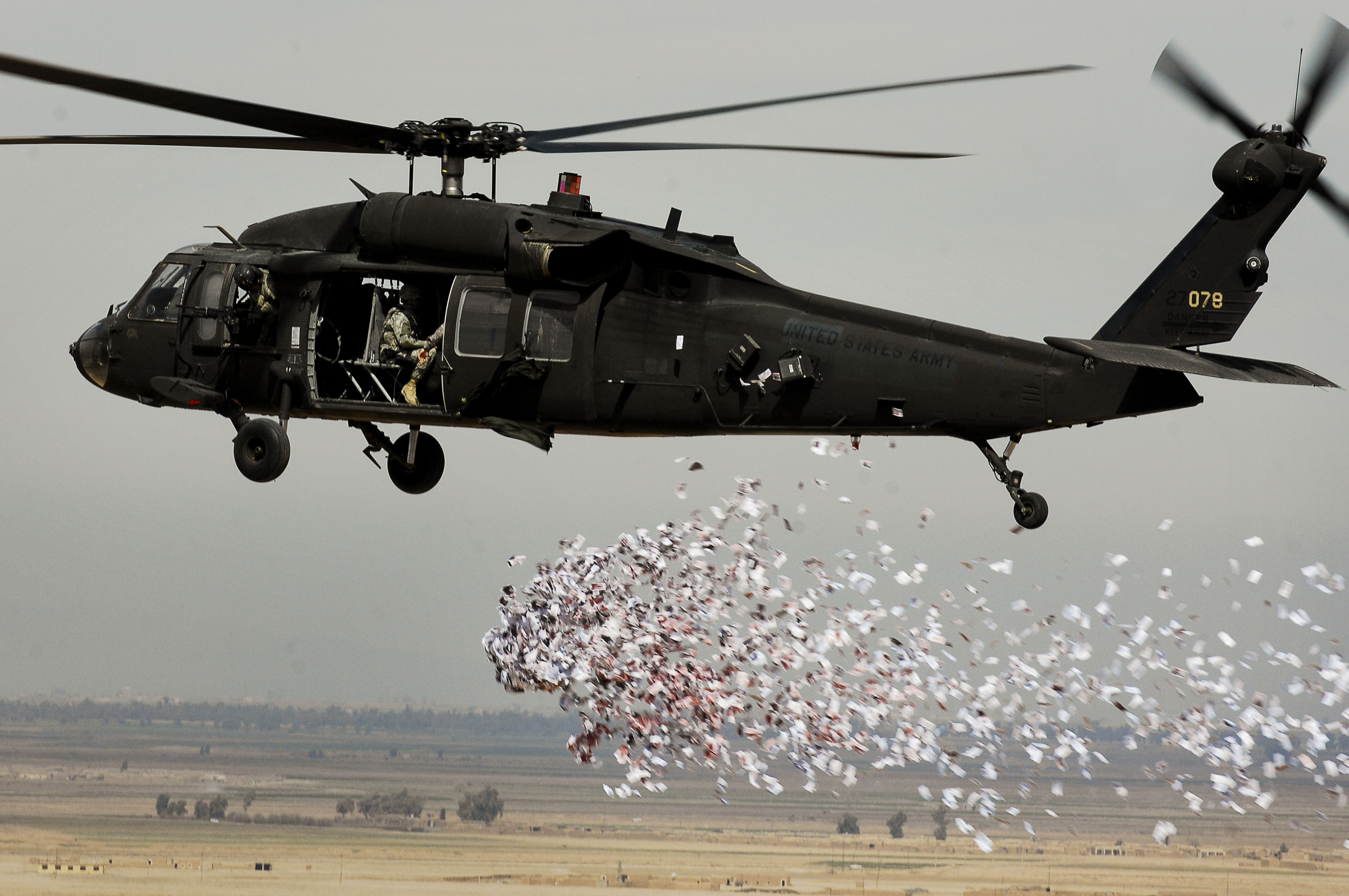
Soldiers of the 350th Tactical Psychological Operations, 10th Mountain Division drop propaganda leaflets over a village near Hawija, Iraq in March 2008.

Following the 11 September 2001 attacks, elements of the division, including its special troops battalion and 1st Battalion, 87th Infantry Regiment (1-87th) infantry deployed to Afghanistan as part of Operation Enduring Freedom in late 2001. This was the first conventional unit to be deployed in the entire US military. The division headquarters arrived at Karshi-Khanabad Air Base, under Major General Franklin L. Hagenbeck, on 12 December 2001 to function as the Combined Forces Land Component Command (CFLCC) (Forward). This command served as the representative for Lieutenant General Paul T. Mikolashek, the Third U.S. Army/CFLCC commanding general (CG) in the theater of operations. As such, Hagenbeck's headquarters was responsible for commanding and controlling virtually all Coalition ground s and ground operations in the theater, including the security of Coalition airfields in Afghanistan, Uzbekistan, and Pakistan, as well as the logistics operations set up to support those s. The division was also intended to defend Uzbekistan against attacks by the Islamic Movement of Uzbekistan, which was seeking to overthrow Islam Karimov's secular government.

On 13 February 2002, Mikolashek ordered Hagenbeck to move CFLCC (Forward) to Bagram airfield located at Bagram and 2 days later the headquarters was officially redesignated as Combined Joint Task (CJTF) Mountain. It assumed responsibility for the planning and execution of what had then become known as Operation Anaconda.

Elements of the division, primarily 1-87th Infantry, remained in the country until mid-2002, fighting to secure remote areas of the country and participating in prominent operations such as Operation Anaconda, the Fall of Mazar-i-Sharif, and the Battle of Qala-i-Jangi. These 1-87th Infantry soldiers became the first U.S. conventional s to fight in Afghanistan. The division also participated in fighting in the Shahi Khot Valley in 2002. In June 2002, elements of the 82nd Airborne Division arrived to relieve CJTF Mountain, and in September, Major General John R. Vines and his Combined Task 82 relieved CJTF Mountain as the major subordinate headquarters to Combined Joint Task 180. Upon the return of the battalions, they were welcomed home and praised by President Bush.

In 2003, the division's headquarters, along with the 1st Brigade, returned to Afghanistan. During that time, they operated in the frontier regions of the country such as Paktika Province, going to places previously untouched by the war in search of Taliban and Al-Qaeda s. Fighting in several small-scale conflicts such as Operation Avalanche, Operation Mountain Resolve, and Operation Mountain Viper, the division maintained a strategy of small units moving through remote regions of the country to interact directly with the population and drive out insurgents. The 1st Brigade also undertook a number of humanitarian missions.

In 2003 and into 2004, the division's aviation brigade deployed for the first time to Afghanistan. As the only aviation brigade in the theater, the brigade provided air support for all U.S. Army units operating in the country. The brigade's mission at that time focused on close air support, medevac missions, and other duties involving combat with Taliban and Al-Qaeda s in the country. The 10th Mountain Division was the first unit to introduce contract working dogs into southern Afghanistan. In the spring of 2004, they had Patriot K-9 Services supply 20 dog teams based at KAF. The teams were trained to detect explosives and perform patrol duties throughout the region. The brigade returned to Fort Drum in 2004.

On the return of the division headquarters and 1st Brigade, the 10th Mountain Division began the process of transformation into a modular division. On 16 September 2004, the division headquarters finished its transformation, adding the 10th Mountain Division Special Troops Battalion. The 1st Brigade became the 1st Brigade Combat Team, while the 3rd Brigade Combat Team, 10th Mountain Division was activated for the first time. In January 2005, the 4th Brigade Combat Team, 10th Mountain Division was activated at Fort Polk, Louisiana. 2nd Brigade Combat Team would not be transformed until September 2005, pending a deployment to Iraq.

==== Iraq deployments ====
In late 2004, the 2nd Brigade Combat Team was deployed to Iraq supporting Operation Iraqi Freedom. The 2nd Brigade Combat Team undertook combat operations in western Baghdad, an area of responsibility that included Abu Ghraib, Mansour, and Route Irish. It returned to the US in late 2005. Around that time, the 1st Brigade Combat Team deployed back to Iraq, staying in the country until 2006.

The next time the 1st Brigade Combat Team was deployed was during the Surge for 15 months in Iraq. Northern Iraq was the theater of operations for 1 BCT from August 2007 until November 2008.

The 4th BCT operated in Northeast Baghdad under the 4th Infantry Division headquarters from November 2007 until January 2009. The 10th Mountain participated in larger-scale operations, such as Operation Phantom Phoenix.

After a one-year rest, the headquarters of the 10th Mountain Division was deployed to Iraq for the first time in April 2008. The division headquarters served as the command element for southern Baghdad until late March 2009, when it displaced to Basrah to replace departing British s on 31 March 2009 to coordinate security for the Multinational Division-South area of responsibility, a consolidation of the previously Polish-led south-central and British-led southeast operational areas. The 10th Mountain Division headquarters transferred authority for MND-S to the 34th Infantry Division, Minnesota Army National Guard on 20 May 2009.

The 2nd Brigade Combat Team was scheduled to deploy to Iraq in the fall of 2009, as a part of the 2009–2010 rotation to Iraq.

==== Afghanistan deployments ====
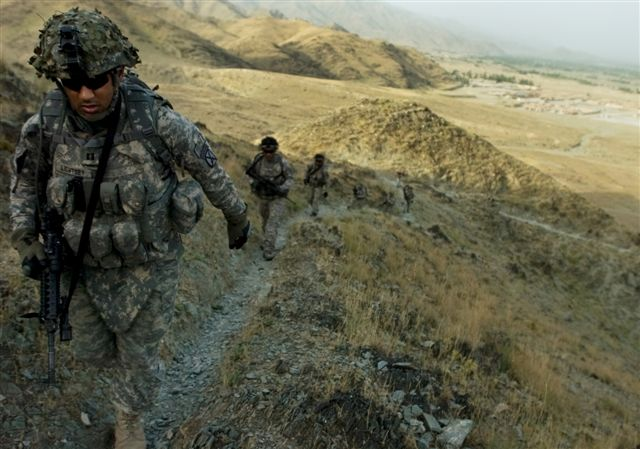
10th Mountain Division troops from the 1st Battalion, 32nd Infantry hike through Kunar Province.

The division headquarters, the 3rd Brigade Combat Team, and two Battalion Task s from the 4th Brigade Combat Team deployed to Afghanistan in 2005, staying in the country until 2006. The division and brigade served in the eastern region of the country, along the border with Pakistan, fulfilling a similar role as it did during its previous deployment. During this time, the deployment of the brigade was extended along with that of the 4th Brigade, 82nd Airborne Division. It was eventually replaced by the 173rd Airborne Brigade Combat Team which was rerouted from Iraq.

In the winter of 2006, the 10th Aviation Brigade, 10th Mountain Division, was deployed again to Afghanistan to support Operation Enduring Freedom as the only aviation brigade in the theater, stationed at Bagram Air Base, Afghanistan. Named "Task Falcon," the brigade's mission was to conduct aviation operations to destroy insurgents and anti-coalition militia in an effort to help build the Afghan National Security 's capability and allow the Afghan government to increase its capabilities. In addition, the Task provided logistical and combat support for International Security Assistance s throughout the country.

The 3rd Brigade Combat Team was slated to deploy to Iraq in 2009, but that deployment was rerouted. In January 2009, the 3rd BCT instead deployed to Kunar, Logar and Wardak Provinces, eastern Afghanistan to relieve the 101st Airborne Division, as part of a new buildup of US forces in that country. The brigade was responsible for expanding forward operating bases and combat outposts (COPs) in the region, as well as strengthening US military presence in preparation for additional US forces to arrive.

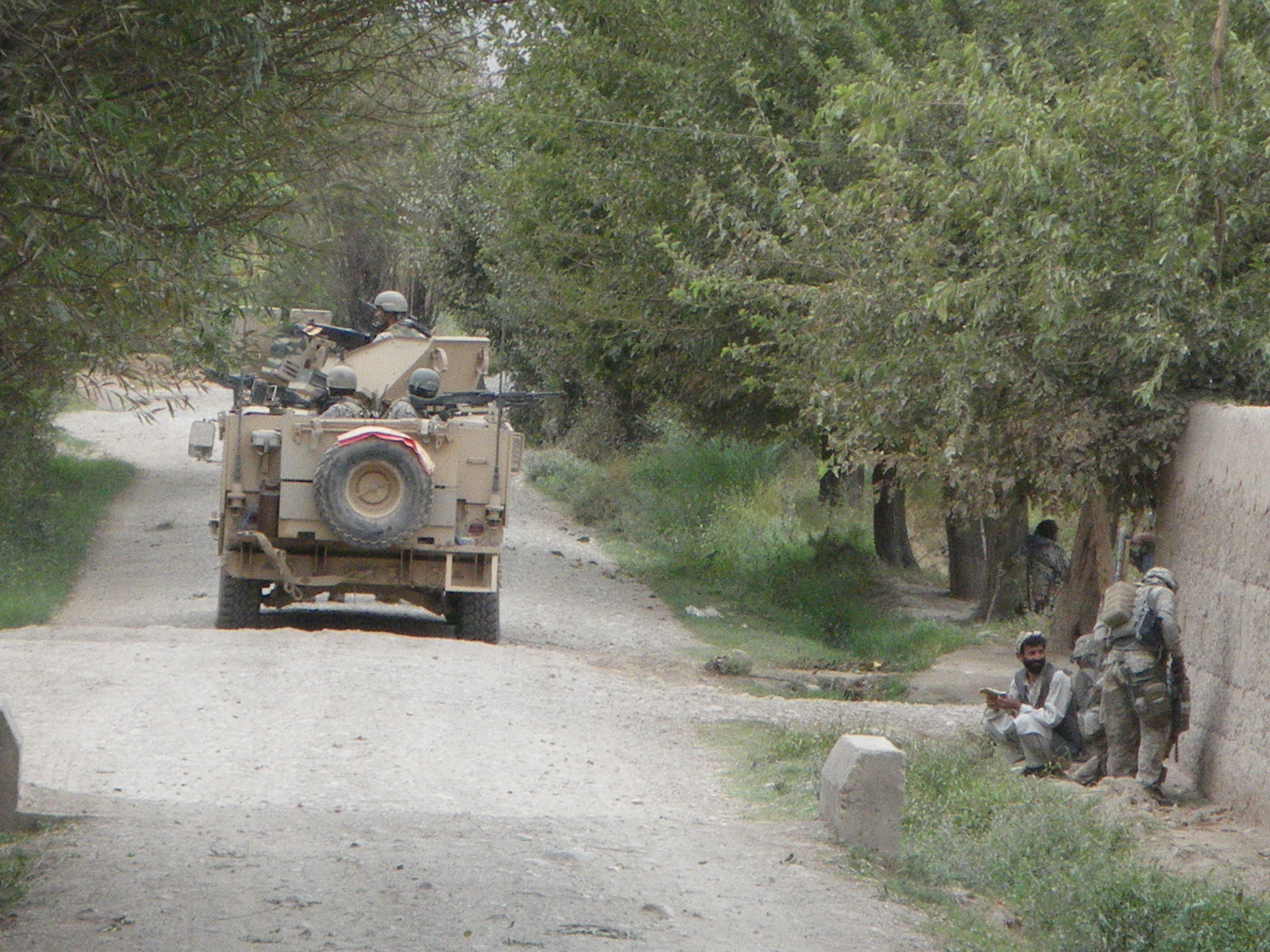
1st Battalion, 87th Infantry Regiment infantry engaging Taliban.

The 1st Brigade Combat Team was scheduled to deploy to Iraq in late 2009 but deployed instead to Afghanistan in March 2010 for 13 months. 1-87th Infantry deployed to Kunduz and Baghlan Provinces, establishing remote combat outposts (COPs) against the Taliban after they had taken control of these provinces over the last several. Notably, Blacksheep Company was responsible for numerous large-scale engagements, including the Battle of Shahabuddin and securing a High-Value Target (HVT) after an air assault raid. This deployment was transformational to the Counterinsurgency in Northern Afghanistan campaign of the war. The Brigade again deployed to Afghanistan in late 2012 to Ghazni Provence for nine months.

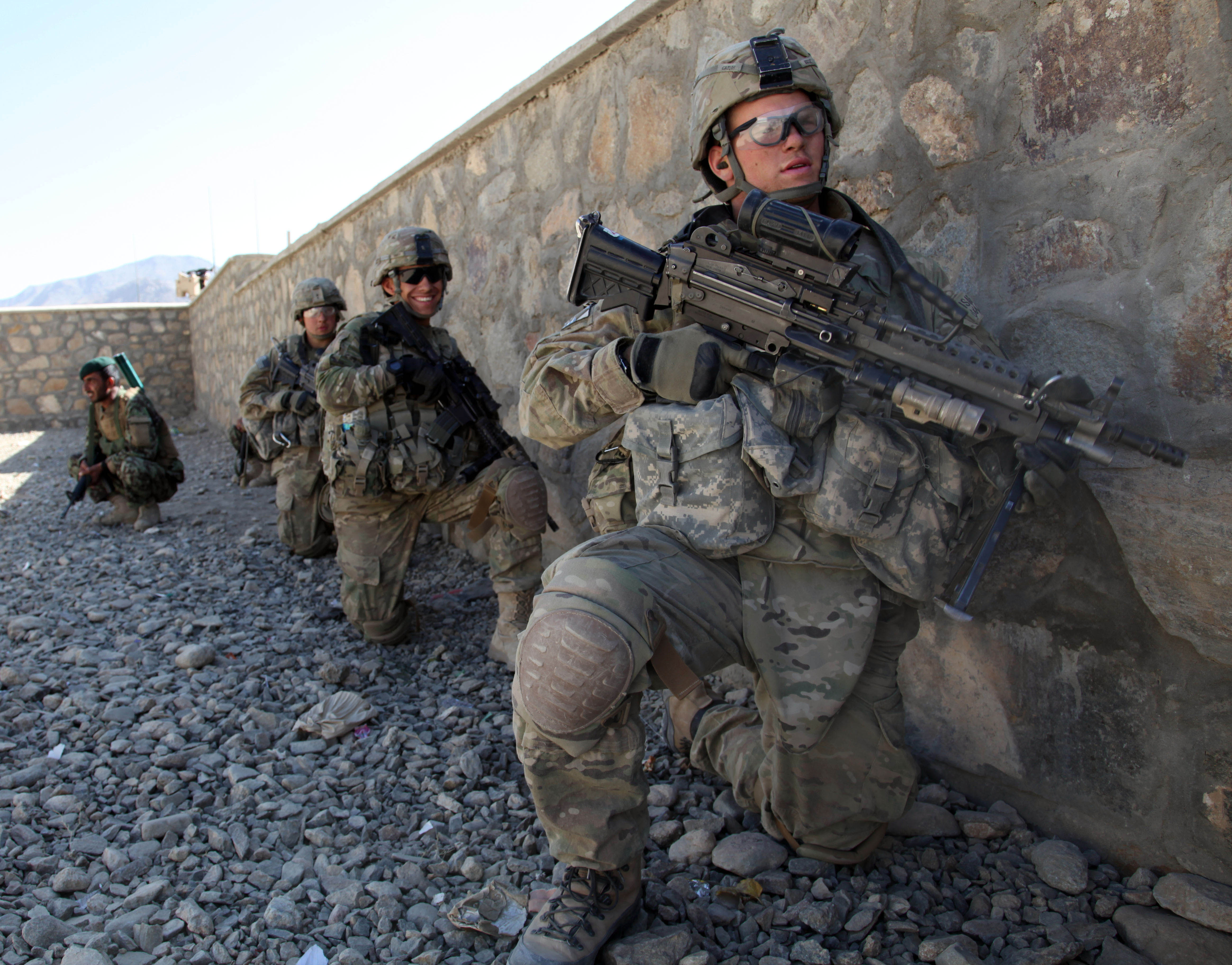
10th Mountain soldiers during an operation in Logar Province.

The 3rd Brigade Combat Team deployed to Kandahar Province, southern Afghanistan in March 2011, again relieving the 101st Airborne Division. During this deployment, 3rd BCT mainly occupied forward operating bases (FOBs) and combat outposts (COPs) in the Maywand, Zhari, and Arghandab Districts of Kandahar Province. The brigade was redeployed to Fort Drum in March 2012 after a twelve-month deployment.

The 4th Brigade Combat Team deployed to Regional Command East, under the 101st Airborne Division from October 2010 until their redeployment in October 2011. The 4th BCT deployed to both Wardak and Logar provinces. During this deployment, they went to places such as Chakh Valley in Wardak Province and Charkh Valley in Logar Province in search of elements of the Haqqani Network. In May 2013, the brigade deployed again to Afghanistan returning home in February 2014.

In 2015, Diana M. Holland became the first woman to serve as a general officer at Fort Drum, and the first woman to serve as a deputy commanding general in one of the Army's light infantry divisions (specifically, the 10th Mountain Division.)

In February 2015, 2nd Brigade Combat Team, 10th Mountain Division were deployed to Afghanistan as part of the Resolute Support Mission in the Post ISAF phase of the War in Afghanistan between late summer and early fall 2015, 300 troops from 10th Mountain's headquarters at deployed to Afghanistan in support of Operation Freedom's Sentinel, along with about 1,000 troops from the 3rd Brigade Combat Team. In February 2016, the Taliban began a new assault on Sangin, Helmand Province, the US responded by deploying 500 to 800 troops from 2nd battalion 87th Infantry Regiment, 10th Mountain Division to Helmand Province in order to prop up Afghan army's 215th Corps in the province, particularly around Sangin, joining US and British special operations s already in the area.

On 5 December 2019, the Department of the Army announced that the 1st Brigade Combat Team would replace the 3rd Brigade Combat Team, 82nd Airborne Division as part of a unit rotation in support of Operation Freedom's Sentinel. The brigade deployed to Afghanistan in February 2020.

=== Operation Atlantic Resolve ===
On 3 November 2016, Stars and Stripes reported that the 10th Combat Aviation Brigade would deploy 1,750 soldiers to Eastern Europe in March 2017, in support of Operation Atlantic Resolve – as part of NATO efforts to reassure Eastern Europe in response to Russian intervention in Ukraine in 2014. The brigade arrived with approximately 60 aircraft, including CH-47 Chinooks, UH-60 Blackhawks, and medevac helicopters. The brigade was headquartered in Germany and the brigade's units were forward-based at locations in Latvia, Romania, and Poland.

=== Operation Inherent Resolve ===
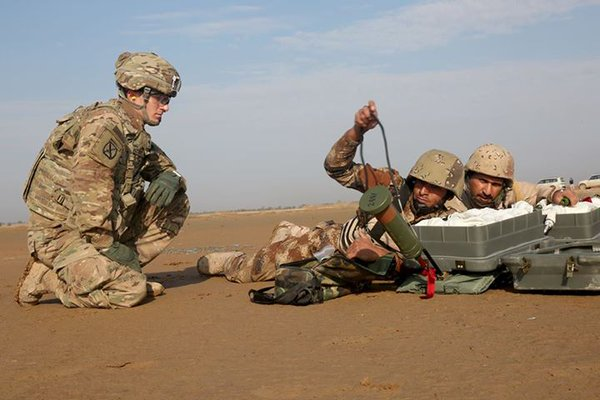
A U.S. Army soldier of the 10th Mountain Division deployed in support of Operation Inherent Resolve advises & assists Iraqi soldiers during a training exercise at Besmaya Range Complex, Iraq, November 10, 2015.

Between late summer and early fall 2015, as well as again in 2016, 1,250 soldiers from the 1st Brigade Combat Team were deployed to Iraq to support Operation Inherent Resolve. During the two deployments the brigade spent in Iraq, they fought to regain control of the cities of Ramadi, Fallujah, and Mosul from the Islamic State of Iraq and Syria. In 2022 the unit would redeploy again, in support of Operation Inherent Resolve.

== Honors ==
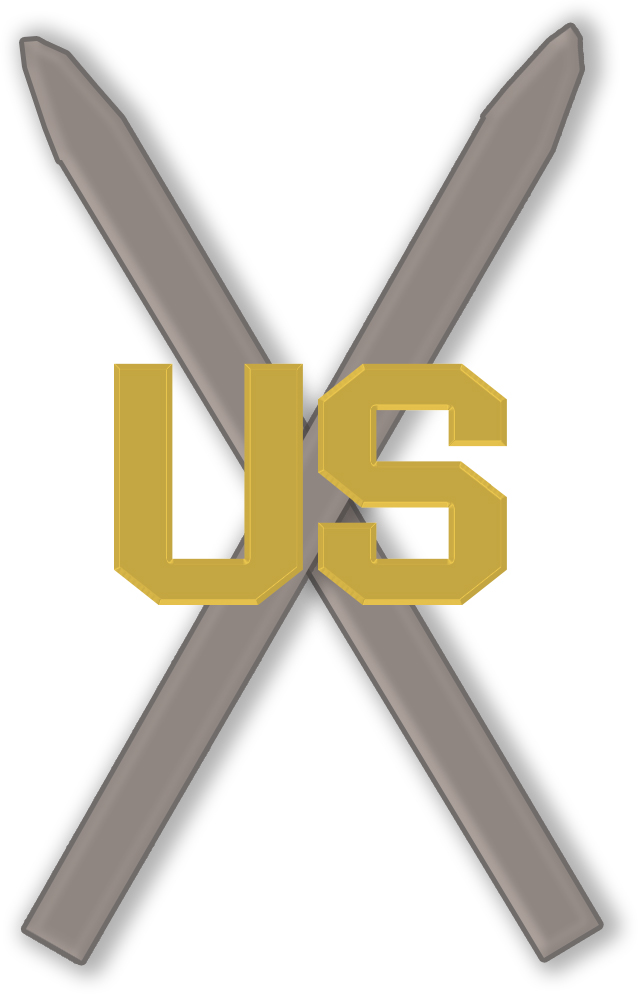
10th Mountain Division Ski Trooper Insignia

The 10th Mountain Division was awarded two campaign streamers in World War II, one campaign streamer for Somalia, and four campaign streamers in the war on terrorism, for a total of seven campaign streamers and three unit decorations in its operational history. Note that some of the division's brigades received more or fewer decorations depending on their individual deployments.

In 2026, the Army announced that it has officially approved the formerly unauthorized ski trooper insignia to be worn on the AGSU garrison cap for soldiers in the 10th Mountain Division.

=== Unit decorations ===
Ribbon	Award	Year	Notes
	Joint Meritorious Unit Award (Army)	1992–1995	for service in Somalia
	Meritorious Unit Commendation (Army)	2001–2002	for service in Central Asia
	Meritorious Unit Commendation (Army)	2003–2004	for service in Afghanistan
	Meritorious Unit Commendation (Army)	28 Feb 06 – 27 Feb 07	for service in Afghanistan
	Valorous Unit Award (Army)	Aug 2006 - Oct 2007	For outstanding service in Iraq
	Meritorious Unit Commendation (Army)	2008–2009	for service in Iraq
	Valorous Unit Award (Army)	Mar 2010 - Apr 2011	For outstanding service in Afghanistan
	Meritorious Unit Commendation (Army)	2014	for service in Afghanistan

=== Campaign streamers ===
Conflict	Streamer	Year(s)
World War II	North Apennines	1945
World War II	Po Valley	1945
Operation Restore Hope	Somalia	1992–1994
Operation Enduring Freedom	Afghanistan	2001–2002
Operation Enduring Freedom	Afghanistan	2003–2004
Operation Enduring Freedom	Afghanistan	2006–2007
Operation Iraqi Freedom	Iraq	2008–2009
Operation Enduring Freedom	Afghanistan	2010–2011

The division's efforts in Afghanistan during Operation Enduring Freedom and beyond led to the division being referred to as the "Tribe of Crossed Swords" by some Afghans.

== In popular culture ==
The 10th Mountain Division's first appearance in popular literature was the semi-fictional novel by Frank Harper, Night Climb, published in 1946 by Longsman, Green, and Company. The title of this book came from the unit's celebrated night ascent of Riva Ridge as part of the Battle of Mount Belvedere, and the novel follows the actions of several members through Operation Encore and Operation Craftsman to the end of hostilities in Italy. The Division was later the subject of the 1996 film Fire on the Mountain, which documented its exploits during World War II.

The 10th Mountain Division is also a prominent element of the book Black Hawk Down and film by the same name, which portrays the Battle of Mogadishu and the division's participation in that conflict. Among the division's other appearances are the Tom Clancy novel Clear and Present Danger, the 2004 War Of The Worlds remake, the 2005 SCI FI film Manticore, 2010 remake starring Keanu Reeves, The Day The Earth Stood Still, Sean Parnell's 2012 war memoir, Outlaw Platoon, about his platoon's experiences in Afghanistan during Operation Enduring Freedom, the 2019 action adventure video game Days Gone, with the game's main protagonist, Deacon St. John, referencing his time spent with the 10th Mountain Division in Afghanistan.

The 3rd Brigade Combat Team, 10th Mountain Division, known as the Spartans, is referenced in the sci-fi action movie War Machine (2026 film).

== Division organization ==
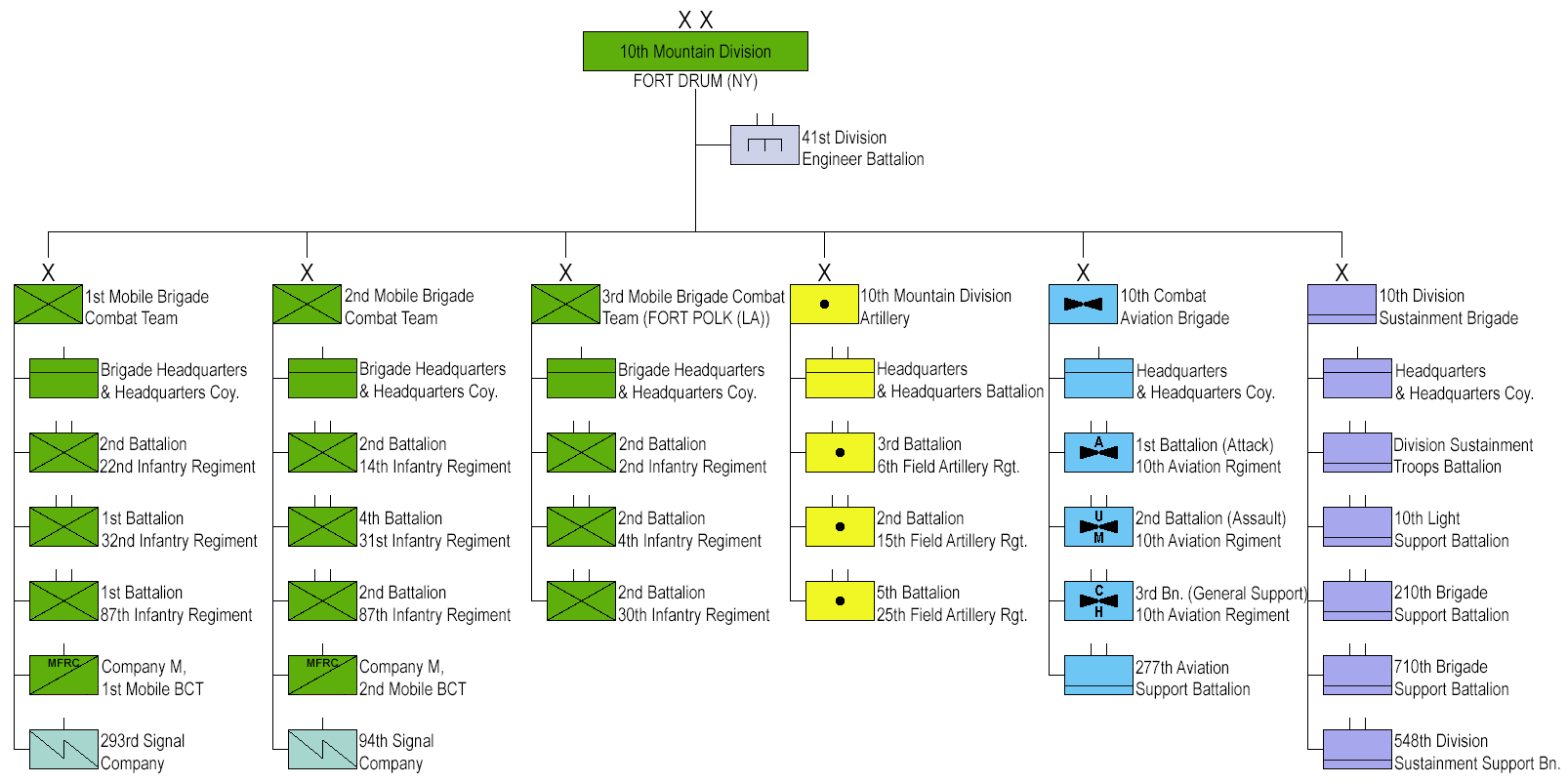
10th Mountain Division organization August 2026

This division consists of a division headquarters and headquarters battalion, three infantry brigade combat teams, a division artillery, a combat aviation brigade, and a division sustainment brigade.

- 10th Mountain Division
  - Division Headquarters and Headquarters Battalion
  - 1st Mobile Brigade Combat Team "Warriors"
    - Headquarters and Headquarters Company
    - 2nd Battalion, 22nd Infantry Regiment
    - 1st Battalion, 32nd Infantry Regiment
    - 1st Battalion, 87th Infantry Regiment
    - Company M, 1st Mobile Brigade Combat Team (Multi-Functional Reconnaissance Company)
    - 293rd Signal Company
  - 2nd Mobile Brigade Combat Team "Commandos"
    - Headquarters and Headquarters Company
    - 2nd Battalion, 14th Infantry Regiment
    - 4th Battalion, 31st Infantry Regiment
    - 2nd Battalion, 87th Infantry Regiment
    - Company M, 2nd Mobile Brigade Combat Team (Multi-Functional Reconnaissance Company)
    - 94th Signal Company
  - 3rd Mobile Brigade Combat Team "Patriots", at Fort Polk (Louisiana)
    - Headquarters and Headquarters Company
    - 2nd Battalion, 2nd Infantry Regiment
    - 2nd Battalion, 4th Infantry Regiment
    - 2nd Battalion, 30th Infantry Regiment
  - 10th Division Artillery
    - Division Headquarters and Headquarters Battalion
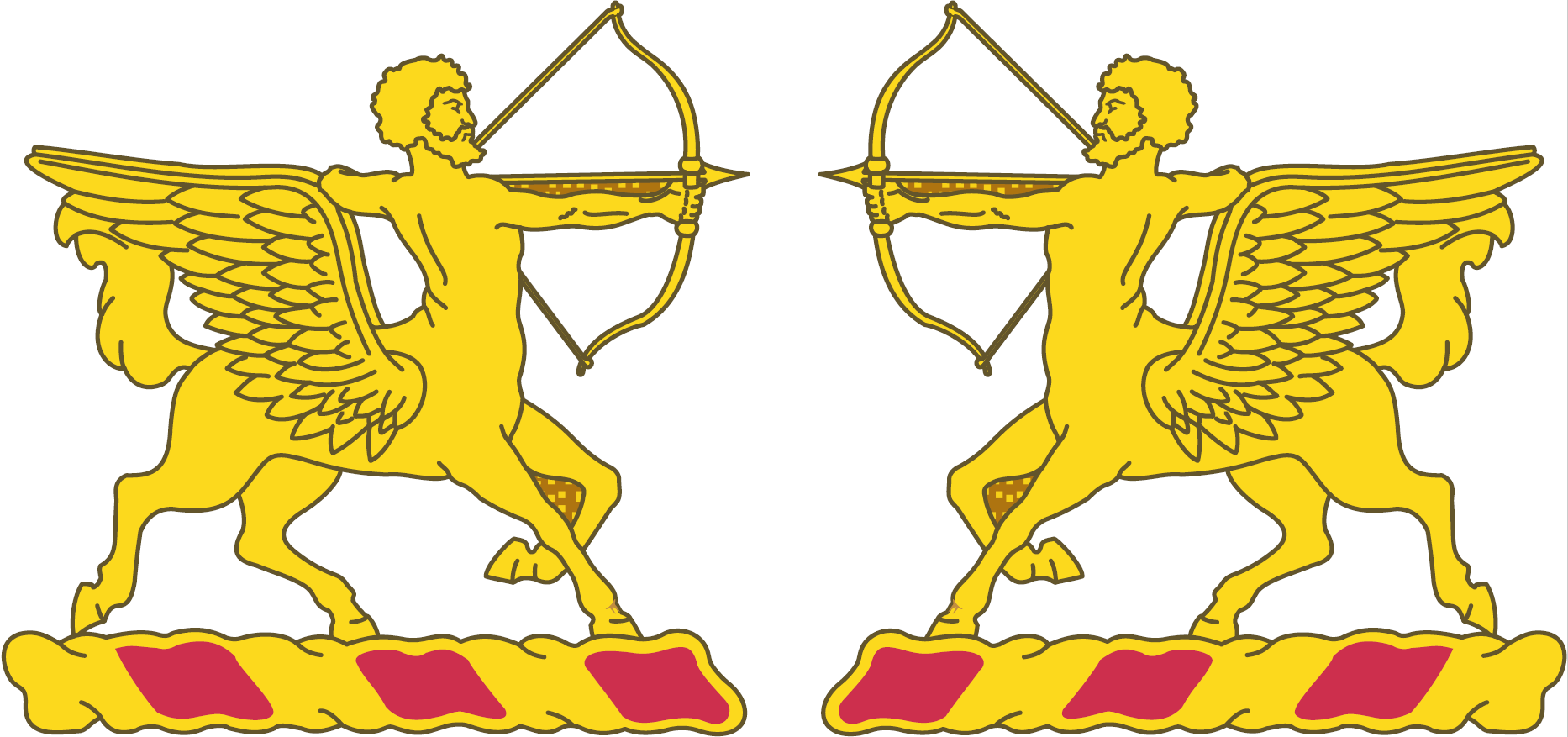
    - 3rd Battalion, 6th Field Artillery Regiment
    - 2nd Battalion, 15th Field Artillery Regiment
    - 5th Battalion, 25th Field Artillery Regiment
  - 10th Combat Aviation Brigade "Falcons"
    - Headquarters and Headquarters Company
    - 1st Battalion (Attack), 10th Aviation Regiment "Tigershark"
    - 2nd Battalion (Assault), 10th Aviation Regiment
    - 3rd Battalion (General Support), 10th Aviation Regiment "Phoenix"
    - 277th Aviation Support Battalion "Mountain Eagle"
  - 10th Division Sustainment Brigade "Muleskinner"
    - Headquarters and Headquarters Company
    - 10th Mountain Division Sustainment Troops Battalion "Workhorse"
    - 10th Light Support Battalion "Sherpa"
    - 210th Brigade Support Battalion "Provider"
    - 710th Light Support Battalion "Patriot Support"
    - 548th Division Sustainment Support Battalion "Sword"
  - 41st Division Engineer Battalion "Sappers"

== Previous commanders ==
Individuals who have served as commanders and command sergeants major of the 10th Mountain Division include:

Division commanders

- MG Lloyd E. Jones, July 1943 – November 1944
- MG George P. Hays, November 1944 – November 1945
- Division inactivated, November 1945 – August 1948
- MG Lester J. Whitlock, August 1948 – October 1950
- MG James E. Moore, November 1950 – May 1951
- BG Marcus B. Bell, May 1951 – November 1951
- MG George D. Shea, November 1951 – January 1953
- MG Thomas L. Harrold, February 1953 – June 1954
- MG Philip D. Ginder, June 1954 – March 1955
- MG George E. Martin, April 1955 – March 1956
- MG Barksdale Hamlett, April 1956 – June 1957
- MG Walter B. Yeager, July 1957 – April 1958
- BG Miller O. Perry, May 1958 – June 1958
- Division inactivated, June 1958 – February 1985
- MG William S. Carpenter, February 1985 – April 1988
- MG Peter J. Boylan, April 1988 – September 1990
- MG James R. Ellis, September 1990 – September 1991
- MG Steven L. Arnold, September 1991 – August 1993
- MG David C. Meade, August 1993 – July 1995
- MG Thomas N. Burnette, July 1995 – July 1997
- MG Lawson W. Magruder, June 1997 – March 1998
- MG James L. Campbell, March 1998 – August 2001
- MG Franklin L. (Buster) Hagenbeck, August 2001 – August 2003
- MG Lloyd J. Austin III, August 2003 – August 2005
- MG Benjamin C. Freakley, August 2005 – April 2007
- MG Michael L. Oates, April 2007 – September 2009
- MG James L. Terry, September 2009 – November 2011
- MG Mark A. Milley, November 2011 – December 2012
- MG Stephen J. Townsend, December 2012 – March 2015
- MG Jeffrey L. Bannister, March 2015 – April 2017
- MG Walter E. Piatt, April 2017 – May 2019
- MG Brian J. Mennes, May 2019 – July 2021
- MG Milford H. Beagle Jr., July 2021 – September 2022
- MG Gregory K. Anderson, September 2022 – May 2024
- MG Scott M. Naumann, May 2024 – present

Command Sergeants Major

- CSM Southern W. Hewitt, January 1985 – July 1990
- CSM Robert C. Sexton, July 1990 – May 1994
- CSM Jesse G. Laye, June 1994 – July 1995
- CSM Frank J. Mantia, July 1995 – February 1998
- CSM Teddy Harman, February 1998 – July 2000
- CSM Kenneth C. Lopez, October 2000 – August 2002
- CSM Dennis M. Carey, August 2002 – June 2004
- CSM Ralph C. Borja, July 2004 – May 2007
- CSM James W. Redmore, July 2007 – March 2010
- CSM Christopher K. Greca, March 2010 – November 2011
- CSM Richard Merritt, January 2012 – January 2014
- CSM R. Ray Lewis, January 2014 – January 2016
- CSM Charles W. Albertson, January 2016 – September 2017
- CSM Samuel Roark, November 2017 – March 2020
- CSM Mario O. Terenas, March 2020 – July 2022
- CSM Nema Mobarakzadeh, July 2022 – May 2024
- CSM Brett W. Johnson, May 2024 – present

== Notable former members ==
- Travis Atkins, Iraq
- Skippy Baxter, World War II
- Bill Bowerman, World War II
- David Brower, World War II
- Bob Dole, World War II
- Donald G. Dunn, World War II
- James Earl Jones, Cold War
- Billy Kearns, World War II
- John David Magrath, World War II
- Michael Ollis, Afghanistan
- Jared C. Monti, Afghanistan
- Paul Petzoldt, World War II
- Walter Prager, World War II
- Michael Prysner, Iraq
- Pete Seibert, World War II
- William D. Swenson, Afghanistan
- Torger Tokle, World War II
- Rupert von Trapp, World War II
- Werner von Trapp, World War II
- Alejandro Villanueva, Afghanistan
- Eric Wolf, World War II

== Sources ==
- Baumgardner, Randy W. (1998). 10th Mountain Division. Nashville, Tennessee: Turner Publishing Company. ISBN 978-1-56311-430-4.
- Feuer, A. B. (2006). Packs On!: Memoirs of the 10th Mountain Division in World War II. Mechanicsburg, Pennsylvania: Stackpole Books. ISBN 978-0-8117-3289-5.
- Hampton, Henry J. (12 June 1945). "The Riva Ridge Operation" (PDF). Archived from the original (PDF) on 13 June 2013.
- Johnson, Andy; Callahan, Pat (2012). NATO Order of Battle 1989 (.doc).
- McGrath, John J. (2004). The Brigade: A History: Its Organization and Employment in the US Army. Fort Leavenworth, Kansas: Combat Studies Institute Press. ISBN 978-1-4404-4915-4.
- Parnell, Sean (2012), Outlaw Platoon: Heroes, Renegades, Infidels, and the Brotherhood of War in Afghanistan, New York: William Morrow, ISBN 978-0-06-206639-8 Author webcast interview.
- Pushies, Fred (2008). 10th Mountain Division. Minneapolis, Minnesota: Zenith Press. ISBN 978-0-7603-3349-5.
- Sasser, Charles W. (2009). None Left Behind: The 10th Mountain Division and the Triangle of Death. New York: St. Martin's Press. ISBN 978-0-312-55544-3.
- Shelton, Peter (2003). Climb to Conquer: The Untold Story of WWII's 10th Mountain Division Ski Troops. New York: Scribner. ISBN 978-0-7432-2606-6.
- "Skiing Heritage Journal". Skiing Heritage Journal. 7 (2: The 10th Mountain Division's 50th Memorial Day). New Hartford, Connecticut. Fall 1995. ISSN 1082-2895. OCLC 29404456.
- Young, Gordon Russell (1959). Army Almanac: A Book of Facts Concerning the Army of the United States. Washington, D.C: United States Government Printing Office. OCLC 1022243.
