= Donald G. Dunn =

Decorated WWII veteran (1923–2021)

- Born: June 25, 1923; Pittsburgh, Pennsylvania
- Died: August 16, 2021 (aged 98); Columbus, Ohio
- Education: Wesleyan University

Donald G. Dunn (June 25, 1923 – August 16, 2021) was a decorated U.S. Army veteran of World War II and founder of Plaskolite LLC. He served as a member of the 86th Mountain Infantry Regiment (10th Mountain Division) in the Allied campaign in Northern Italy in 1945. In the final offensive in April 1945, Dunn led a platoon of men up to Hill 775 in the Apennine Mountains and was wounded by a sniper. For his heroism, he was awarded the Silver Star and Purple Heart.

== Early life ==
Donald G. Dunn was born June 25, 1923, in Pittsburgh, Pennsylvania. He attended Wesleyan University in Middletown, Connecticut, before volunteering at the age of 18 to join the United States Army.

== Military service ==
Dunn was trained at Camp Hale, Colorado, before deploying to Italy as a member of the 2nd Platoon, Company G, 86th Mountain Infantry Regiment, 10th Mountain Infantry Division. His first combat engagement came in March 1945 near the village of Iola in the Apennine Mountains in Northern Italy.

The Fifth United States Army commenced its final offensive on the Italian front, Operation Craftsman, on April 14. On the first day of the offensive Company G, under the command of Captain Ridgway Foust, advanced to Rocca di Roffeno, coming under heavy artillery fire during the night. The next day Company G continued the attack against faltering German resistance. At 1600 hours Dunn led his platoon in an attack to seize Hill 775, which was defended by German infantry and a machine gun emplacement.

Dunn personally led his soldiers across a narrow valley and onto the slopes of Hill 775, when machine gun fired pinned down the unit. Dunn ordered a fire team led by Corporal Harding Shelby to envelop the Germans by advancing up a draw, but Shelby and his soldiers were killed in the attempt to outflank the German positions. A sniper on the far side of the valley then began to pick off the remaining men, hitting them from behind. Wounded in the chest, Dunn decided to continue the attack and led his men up the hill. The Germans withdrew, leaving the American soldiers in possession of this key piece of terrain. The engagement expedited the advance of the 10th Mountain Division into the Po River Valley.

For his heroism on Hill 775, Dunn was awarded the Silver Star and Purple Heart. His other awards and decorations include the Bronze Star and Combat Infantrymen's Badge.

== Post-War career ==
Dunn returned to the United States and invested in Plaskolite, Inc., a small company that manufactured drinking straws and fly swatters. After his partner unexpectedly departed with Dunn's investment capital and left the company nearly bankrupt, Dunn salvaged the business, turning it into the largest maker of thermoplastic (polycarbonate and acrylic) sheeting in North America. Dunn expanded its operations from making straws, fly swatters, and hula hoops to manufacturing lighting panels, mirrors, and other products for retail and commercial uses. Plaskolite's products today are found among other places in automobiles, signage, lighting, windows, kitchens, bathrooms, retail displays, and eyewear. The company today produces thermoplastic products in the United States, Mexico, and Turkey, employing more than 1,200 people.

Dunn turned the leadership of the company over to his son James in the 1980s, but remained involved in the company until its sale to a private equity firm in 2015. He continued to be active in politics and education. To honor his wartime service, in 2013 the Dunn family founded the Donald G. and Mary A. Dunn Chair of Modern Military History at The Ohio State University.

In 2013, along with the founding of the Donald G. and Mary A. Dunn Chair of Modern Military History, the Donald G. Dunn Scholarship Fund was founded to support Ohio State University undergraduates and graduate students that are studying for the World War II study abroad program.

== Personal life ==
Dunn married Mary Elizabeth Altmaier in 1948 after graduating from Wesleyan University. The two then moved to Columbus, Ohio, where they raised five children. He died in August 2021 at the age of 98.
