= Mountain Division (disambiguation) =

Mountain Division is a railroad line that was once owned and operated by the Maine Central Railroad (MEC).

Mountain Division may also refer to:

== Infantry units ==
=== Germany ===
- 1st Mountain Division (Bundeswehr)
- 1st Mountain Division (Wehrmacht)
- 2nd Mountain Division (Wehrmacht)
- 3rd Mountain Division (Wehrmacht)
- 4th Mountain Division (Wehrmacht)
- 5th Mountain Division (Wehrmacht)
- 6th Mountain Division (Wehrmacht)
- 6th SS Mountain Division Nord
- 7th Mountain Division (Wehrmacht)
- 7th SS Volunteer Mountain Division Prinz Eugen
- 8th Mountain Division (Wehrmacht)
- 9th Mountain Division (Wehrmacht)
- 13th Waffen Mountain Division of the SS Handschar (1st Croatian)
- 21st Waffen Mountain Division of the SS Skanderbeg
- 23rd Waffen Mountain Division of the SS Kama (2nd Croatian)
- 24th Waffen Mountain Division of the SS Karstjäger
- 188th Reserve Mountain Division (Wehrmacht)

=== United States ===
- 10th Mountain Division
  - 10th Mountain Division Artillery
  - 4th Brigade Combat Team, 10th Mountain Division
  - Combat Aviation Brigade, 10th Mountain Division
  - Special Troops Battalion, 10th Mountain Division
    - Special Troops Battalion, 1st Brigade Combat Team, 10th Mountain Division (United States)
    - Special Troops Battalion, 2nd Brigade Combat Team, 10th Mountain Division (United States)
    - Special Troops Battalion, 3rd Brigade Combat Team, 10th Mountain Division (United States)

=== Other countries ===
- 4th Mountain Division (India)
- 8th Mountain Division (India)
- 4 Mountain Infantry Division Livorno (Italian Army)
- 76th Armenian Mountain Division, Soviet Union

== Other military units ==
- Cheyenne Mountain Division

== Other uses ==
- Mountain Division of the Mountain West Conference

== See also ==
- Mountain (disambiguation) to see other types.
- Central Division (disambiguation)
- Eastern Division (disambiguation)
- Northern Division (disambiguation)
- Southern Division (disambiguation)
- Western Division (disambiguation)
