= Special Troops Battalion, 3rd Brigade Combat Team, 10th Mountain Division =

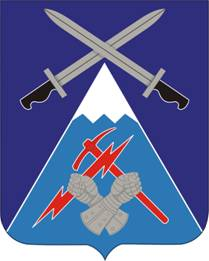
- Special Troops Battalion, 3rd Brigade Combat Team, 10th Mountain Division coat of arms
- Active: 16 September 2004—Present
- Country: United States of America
- Allegiance: United States Army
- Branch: Active duty
- Type: combat support
- Role: Mountain Warfare; Arctic Warfare
- Size: battalion
- Part of: 3rd Brigade Combat Team, 10th Mountain Division
- Garrison/HQ: Fort Drum, New York
- Engagements: Afghanistan Campaign

Insignia
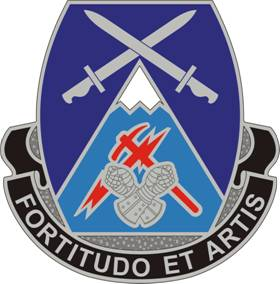
- Distinctive unit insignia

The Special Troops Battalion, 3rd Brigade Combat Team (BCT), 10th Mountain Division was a special troops battalion of the United States Army headquartered at Fort Drum, New York. It was the organization for the command elements of the 3rd Brigade Combat Team, 10th Mountain Division. The battalion contained the brigade's senior command structure, including its Headquarters and Headquarters Company (HHC), as well as military police, engineering, intelligence, and communications elements. An inactivation ceremony was held on 24 October 2014 on Magrath Field, Fort Drum, NY to mark the inactivation of the battalion. The 3rd Brigade held its inactivation ceremony on 14 August 2014 to mark its inactivation.

== Organization ==
The Brigade Special Troops Battalion (BSTB) was a subordinate battalion of the 3rd BCT, 10th Mountain Division, and was a permanent formation of the brigade; additionally, the BCT's command elements are contained within the BSTB.

The battalion consisted of several companies; both the brigade's and the battalion's HHCs, as well as Alpha Company, a combat engineer company; Bravo Company, a military intelligence company; Charlie Company, a communications company; and a military police (MP) platoon are incorporated into the battalion HHC. These companies provide combat support functions for the maneuver battalions of the BCT.

== History ==
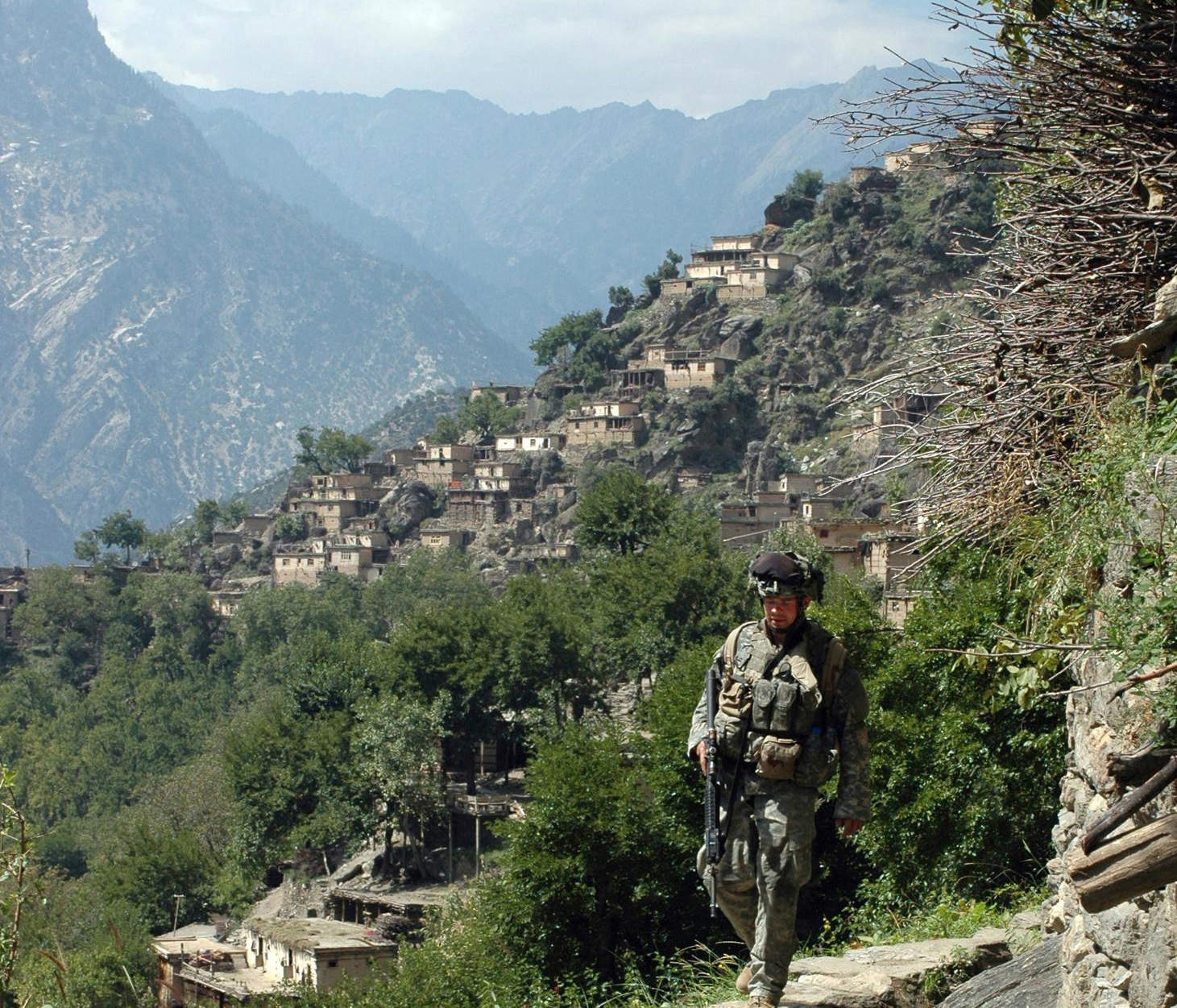
10th Mountain Soldier in patrol in Nuristan Province.

Upon the return of the division headquarters and 1st Brigade from a deployment to Afghanistan, the 10th Mountain Division began the process of transformation into a modular division. On 16 September 2004, the division headquarters finished its transformation. The 1st Brigade became the 1st Brigade Combat Team, while the 3rd Brigade Combat Team, 10th Mountain Division was activated for the first time. In January 2005, the 4th Brigade Combat Team, 10th Mountain Division was activated at Fort Polk, Louisiana. 2nd Brigade Combat Team would not be transformed until September 2005, pending a deployment to Iraq. The Special Troops Battalion, 3rd Brigade Combat Team was first constituted on 16 September 2004 in the Regular Army as Special Troops Battalion, 3rd Brigade Combat Team, 10th Mountain Division, and activated at Fort Drum, New York. The US Army's modular force structure transformation included the creation of Brigade Special Troops Battalions. These units were designed to provide organic signals, engineering, military intelligence, military police, and other support which had historically been achieved by the habitual attachment of companies and platoons from units assigned to parent divisions. Elements of the 10th Signal Battalion, 110th Military Intelligence Battalion, 41st Engineer Battalion, and 10th Military Police Company were all inactivated and reflagged as elements of the new Brigade Special Troops Battalions.

True to the new Battalion's motto Vanguard, the unit was quick to prove its place as the tip of the combat spear. In February 2006, the unit deployed as a member of Task Force Spartan in support of Operation Enduring Freedom, operating within Regional Command East. The Intelligence and Signal Companies provided critical support to the entire Task Force, while Headquarters Company and Alpha Company conducted combat operations in Logar Province, and Paktiya Province, respectively. The Vanguard Battalion participated in all major operational campaigns, including Operation Mountain Lion, Operation Mountain Thrust, Operation Mountain Fury and Operation Mountain Eagle. In February 2007, the Spartan Task Force faced an additional four-month extension in order to facilitate a surge into several northern provinces that were experiencing increased insurgent activity. The Battalion relocated from Gardez to Jalalabad and moved to quell violence in the provinces of Nuristan, Nangahar, Kunar and Laghman. The Battalion's extended OEF tour culminated with a successful relief in place with Task Force Airborne, 173 ABN BCT.

Upon redeployment from Afghanistan, the Battalion immediately began preparing for future combat operations in Iraq. Scheduled to deploy to Baghdad in the Fall of 2008, the unit conducted rigorous training and field exercises, culminating in a successful rotation at the Joint Readiness Training Center at Fort Polk in May 2008. In September 2008, the Brigade Combat Team was dramatically redirected with a new mission of deploying to quell increased insurgent activity within Afghanistan's Logar and Wardak provinces. On 29 December 2008, Task Force Vanguard deployed to Afghanistan in support of the International Security Assistance Force, symbolizing the commitment of the United States Government to ensuring continued peace and prosperity within the Islamic Republic of Afghanistan. The Battalion again spearheaded the Brigade's movement into theater and rapidly established communication and intelligence assets for the entire Task Force in Logar and Wardak provinces in order to enable the remainder of the Brigade to successfully move into sector. Soldiers from the BSTB operated within Regional Command East in three different provinces to include Logar, Wardak and Kunar. On 4 February 2009 the 3rd BSTB conducted a successful transfer of authority with 4th BSTB, 101st Airborne Division and officially inherited responsibility for development of Logar Province. Immediately, 3rd BSTB began its myriad missions as the subordinate units quickly split off to support missions throughout the BCT operating environment. For the first half of the deployment, 3rd BSTB focused squarely upon the non-security lines of operation. Charged with partnering with the Czech Republic Provincial Reconstruction Team and the Afghan provincial leadership, 3rd BSTB reorganized its staff to attack issues along the lines of infrastructure, economic, and governance development. However, in May 2009, 3rd BCT reorganized combat power within AO Spartan, giving 3rd BSTB security responsibility for the four northern districts of Logar Province, in addition to the development responsibility for the entire province. Soldiers from all three line companies served as infantry combat Soldiers, given manpower shortages and mission requirements. At the height of the deployment, immediately prior to the Afghan National Elections of August 2009, the 3rd BSTB consisted of over 700 Soldiers; during that time, these extraordinary men and women could be found conducting combat patrols, pulling security at far-flung outposts, conducting offensive combat operations, clearing routes of IEDs and promoting increased economic and governance development throughout the province, all regardless of MOS. The 3rd BSTB had arguably one of the most successful deployments of any Special Troops Battalion within the history of the Army. A testament to this fact was the ever-increasing and ever-changing mission set that was met with little argument, but rather, a can-do effort that is more than anything a portrait of the brave men and women who comprise the 3rd BSTB. The Battalion concluded their successful tour with a flawless relief in place by the 173rd STB in December 2009. Upon return to Fort Drum in January 2010 the Battalion executed a compressed Refit and Regeneration in preparation for an aggressive Training cycle that included support to every Collective Training Event in the Brigade Combat Team. Training culminated in an exceptional JRTC Rotation 11-02. The Battalion was ready and made final preparations for its next mission.

On 6 March 2011, a deployment ceremony was held as the Vanguard Battalion deployed once again to Afghanistan, this time to Regional Command – South where the Vanguard Soldiers stood trained and ready to support the Spartan Brigade with Engineer, Intelligence, Signal, and Military Police support to Counter-Insurgency Operations in the Zhari and Maiwand District of Kandahar Province. On 18 April 2011, 3rd BCT relieved 2nd BCT, 101st Airborne Division (Air assault) in sector. The Vanguards conducted the RIP/TOA ceremony with the Raptor Battalion 2–101 BSTB on 15 April 2011 and quickly sent elements in every part of the battlespace enabling the BCT and the maneuver BNs with SIGINT, HUMINT, ISR, Engineer, Military Police and Communication platforms from the onset of the spring fighting season. Additionally, Vanguards assumed the mission of Base Defense for the 5000 man FOB Pasab, operation of the BCT Field Detention Site, Zharay District Center security and Highway 1 repair and revitalization, and BCT CERP Management. The Battalion's key enablers participated in every BCT named operation and the majority of the five maneuver Battalions operations. During the deployment, Engineers were credited for reducing over 76 IEDs, and 4 kilometers of tree-line, construction of 57 pieces of Tactical Infrastructure, emplacement of over 15 km of wire obstacles and the live fire of 19 MICLICs and 100 APOBS. The Military Intelligence Company flew more than any other BCT in Afghanistan on hundreds of missions totaling over 5100 hours of flight time. HUMINTers were involved in over 50 source meetings and 200 dismount patrols. The SIGINT platoon assisted in the capture of 46 HVIs. The Charlie Company "Chargers" provided constant communication to the largest network in RC-S and one of the most complex in Afghanistan. They also were responsible for the management and the construction of ten temporary schools for over 1000 students within the CTF Spartan AO.

The Vanguard Battalion revitalized 72 km of Highway 1 through Zharay and Maiwand District managing over 50 pothole repair projects, dozens of culvert repairs, painting and sealing of 50 km of highway, and two main bridge repairs totaling over $2M in development projects for the local government. As the CERP Manager for the Spartan BCT, the Vanguards staffed, managed, and pushed hundreds of projects totaling well over $15M, increasing the safety for coalition forces and local nationals and making a visible change in the security and a sign of progress in both districts. The Vanguard battalion returned from Afghanistan in March 2012 and conducted the uncasing ceremony in late March 2012.

In October 2013, the Vanguard Battalion deployed to Afghanistan, returning to Regional Command-East with its headquarters on FOB Lightning, Paktiya Province. For this deployment the 3rd BSTB provided unmatched advise and assist support to the Afghan National Security Forces (ANSF) in addition to providing Engineer, Military Intelligence, Force Protection and Signal support to Task Force Spartan. Augmented by Bandit Troop, 3rd Squadron 71st Cavalry Regiment and Golf Forward Support Company, 710th Brigade Support Battalion, the Battalion made critical contributions to the development of the ANSF and was instrumental in the overwhelming success of 3rd BCT. The 3rd BSTB Advise and Assist Teams provided crucial support to their Afghan partners, ensuring a successful 2014 Afghan Presidential Election. Additionally, the Battalion provided training and advising support to the Afghan Police as well as to the 203rd Corps' HQ and Engineer, Military Intelligence, and Signal battalions The Vanguard Battalion returned from Afghanistan for the last time and uncased its colors on 23 July 2014.

=== Recent deployments ===
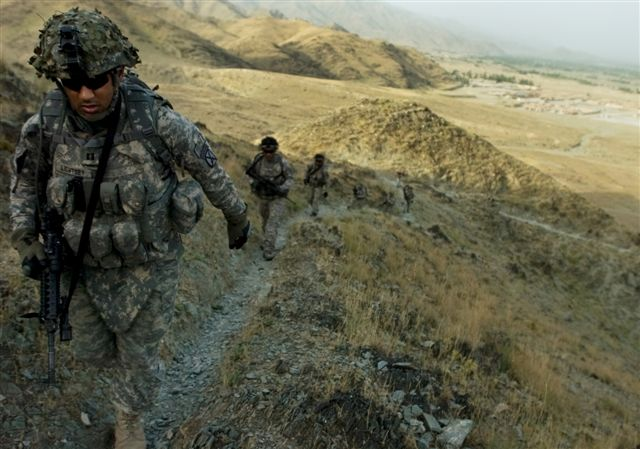
10th Mountain Division troops from the 1st Battalion, 32nd Infantry hike through Kunar Province.

The division headquarters and 3rd Brigade Combat Team redeployed to Afghanistan in February 2006, staying in the country until June 2007. The division and brigade served in the eastern region of the country, along the border with Pakistan, fulfilling a similar role as it did during its previous deployment. Prior to the end of its twelve-month deployment cycle, the brigade was extended for an additional four months, in the end serving a sixteen-month tour; it was eventually replaced by the 173rd Airborne Brigade Combat Team which was rerouted from Iraq.

After a one-year rest, the headquarters of the 10th Mountain Division was deployed to Iraq for the first time in April 2008, along with the 4th Brigade Combat Team. The division headquarters served as the command element for southern Baghdad, while the 4th BCT operated in North Baghdad. The 10th Mountain participated in larger scale operations such as Operation Phantom Phoenix.

The 3rd Brigade Combat Team was slated to deploy to Iraq in 2009, but that deployment was rerouted. In January 2009, the 3rd BCT instead deployed to Logar and Wardak, Nangargar and Kunar Provinces in eastern Afghanistan to relieve the 101st Airborne Division, as part of a new buildup of US forces in that country. The brigade was responsible for expanding Forward Operating Bases in the region, as well as strengthening US military presence in the region in preparation for additional US forces to arrive.

== Honors ==
=== Unit decorations ===
Ribbon	Award	Year	Notes
	Meritorious Unit Commendation (Army)	2006–2007, 2008–2009	for service in Afghanistan

=== Campaign streamers ===
Conflict	Streamer	Year(s)
Operation Enduring Freedom	Afghanistan	2006–2007
Operation Enduring Freedom	Afghanistan	2009–2010
