= Special Troops Battalion, 2nd Brigade Combat Team, 10th Mountain Division =

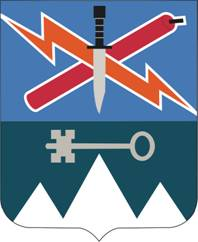
- Special Troops Battalion, 2nd Brigade Combat Team, 10th Mountain Division coat of arms
- Active: 6 November 1944 – 30 November 1945; 1 July 1948 – 14 June 1958; 16 September 2004—Present
- Country: United States of America
- Allegiance: United States Army
- Branch: Active duty
- Type: Special troops battalion
- Role: Mountain warfare
- Size: Battalion
- Part of: 2nd Brigade Combat Team, 10th Mountain Division
- Garrison/HQ: Fort Drum, New York
- Motto: Vigor et Dignitas
- Mascot: Gladiator
- Engagements: Afghanistan Campaign; Iraq Campaign

Insignia
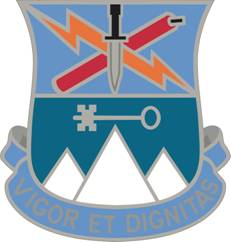
- Distinctive Unit Insignia

The 2nd Brigade Combat Team, 10th Mountain Division Special Troops Battalion is a special troops battalion of the United States Army headquartered at Fort Drum, New York. It is the organization for the command elements of the 2nd Brigade Combat Team, 10th Mountain Division. The battalion contains the division's senior command structure, including its Headquarters and Headquarters Company, as well as communication and support elements.

== Organization ==
The 2nd Brigade Combat Team's Special Troops Battalion traces its lineage to the 2nd Brigade when it was originally activated in 1985. Though the battalion was not activated until 2005, its lineage goes back to 1985.

The 2nd Brigade Combat Team, 10th Mountain Division Special Troops Battalion is subordinate to the 2nd Brigade Combat Team, 10th Mountain Division, and is a permanent formation of the brigade, as the 2nd Brigade Combat Team's command elements are all contained in the STB.

The battalion consists of four companies; the brigade's Headquarters and Headquarters Company, as well as A Company, a Combat Engineer company, B Company, a Military Intelligence company, C Company, a Signal company, and a generic Military Police platoon. These companies provide services for the other battalions of the 2nd Brigade Combat Team. As such, all of the formations are mountain warfare qualified.

== History ==
Following the 11 September 2001 attacks, elements of the division, including its special troops battalion and the 1-87th Infantry deployed to Afghanistan in support of Operation Enduring Freedom in late 2001. These forces remained in the country until mid-2002, fighting to secure remote areas of the country and participating in prominent operations such as Operation Anaconda, the Fall of Mazar-i-Sharif, and the Battle of Qala-i-Jangi. The division also participated in fighting in the Shahi Khot Valley in 2002. Upon the return of the battalions, they were welcomed home and praised by President Bush. In 2003, elements of the 2nd Brigade Combat Team, 10th Mountain Division returned to Afghanistan to support US forces operating in the western region of the country.

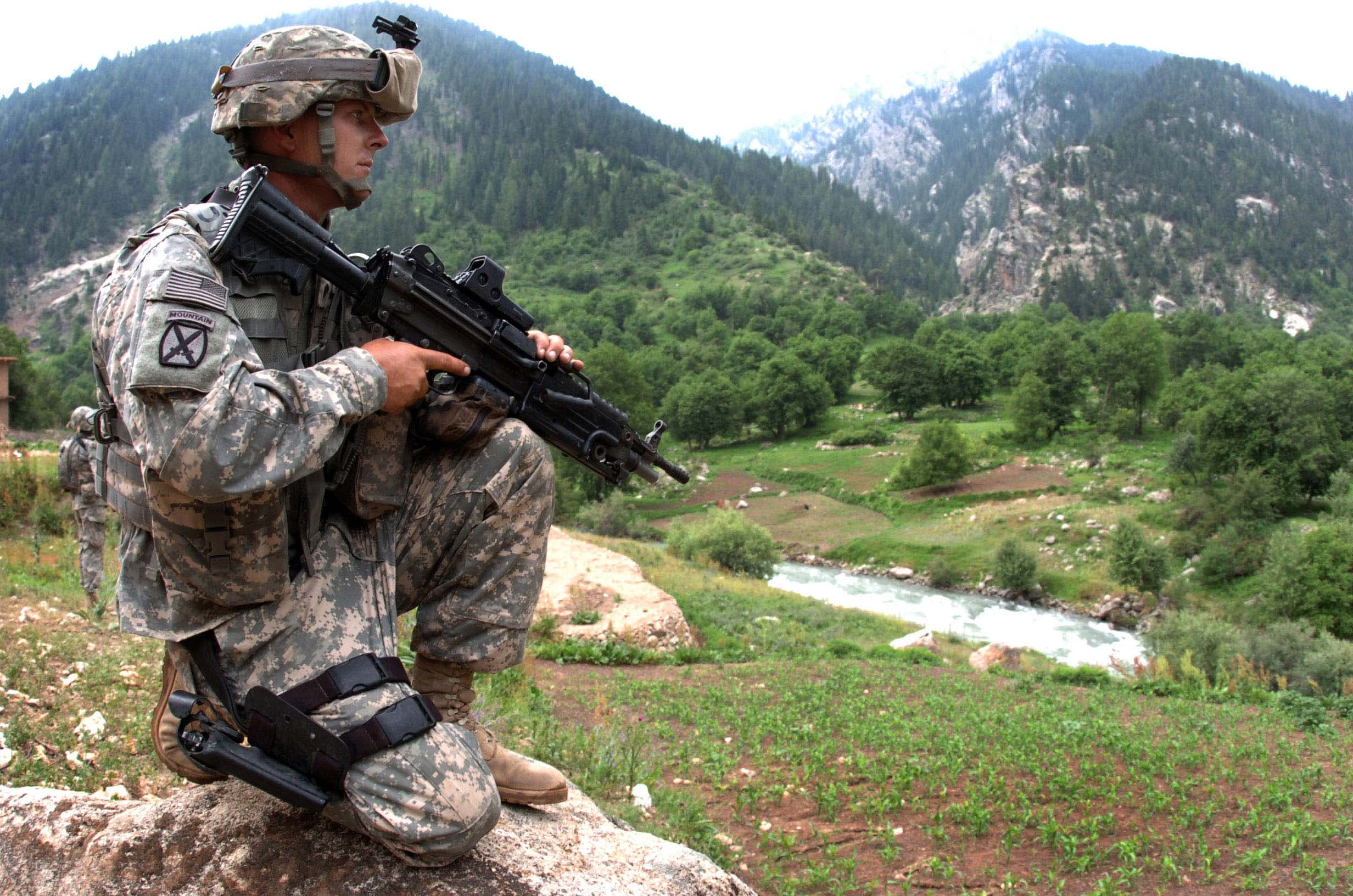
10th Mountain Soldier in the Afghanistan Highlands.

Upon the return of the division headquarters and 1st Brigade, the 10th Mountain Division began the process of transformation into a modular division. On 16 September 2004, the division headquarters finished its transformation. The 1st Brigade became the 1st Brigade Combat Team, while the 3rd Brigade Combat Team, 10th Mountain Division was activated for the first time. In January 2005, the 4th Brigade Combat Team, 10th Mountain Division was activated at Fort Polk, Louisiana. 2nd Brigade Combat Team would not be transformed until September 2005, pending a deployment to Iraq.

In late 2006, 2nd Brigade Combat Team was deployed to Iraq supporting Operation Iraqi Freedom. The 2nd Brigade Combat Team undertook combat operations in western Baghdad, in the area known as the "Sunni Triangle of Death," returning to the US in late 2007. Around that time, the 1st Brigade Combat Team deployed back to Iraq, staying in the country until 2006.

The 1st Brigade Combat Team and the 2nd Brigade Combat Team deployed to Iraq in the fall of 2009, as a part of the 2009–2010 rotation to Baghdad, Iraq. As of summer 2009, it was one of only a few brigades in the US Army to be deployed 40 months or more in support of the War on Terrorism.

== Honors ==
=== Unit decorations ===
Ribbon	Award	Year	Notes
	Meritorious Unit Commendation (Army)	2006–2007	for service in Iraq

Ribbon	Award	Year	Notes
	Meritorious Unit Commendation (Army)	2009–2010	for service in Iraq

=== Campaign streamers ===
Conflict	Streamer	Year(s)
Operation Iraqi Freedom	Iraq	2004–2005
