= Special Troops Battalion, 10th Mountain Division =

Headquarters and Headquarters Battalion, 10th Mountain Division (Light Infantry)
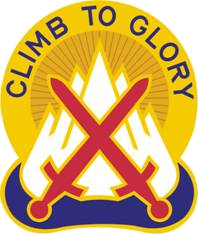
- Headquarters and Headquarters Battalion, 10th Mountain Division Distinctive Unit Insignia
- Active: 6 November 1944 – 30 November 1945; 1 July 1948 – 14 June 1958; 16 September 2004 – Present
- Country: United States of America
- Allegiance: United States Army
- Branch: Active duty
- Type: Headquarters and Headquarters Battalion
- Role: Mountain warfare
- Size: Battalion
- Part of: 10th Mountain Division
- Garrison/HQ: Fort Drum, New York
- Nickname: Gauntlet
- Motto: "Conquer The Mountain"
- Engagements: World War II • Italian Campaign; Afghanistan Campaign; Iraq Campaign

Insignia
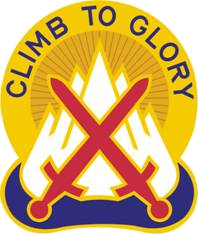
- Distinctive Unit Insignia

The 10th Mountain Division Headquarters and Headquarters Battalion is a unit of the United States Army headquartered at Fort Drum, New York. It is the organization for the command elements of the 10th Mountain Division. The battalion contains the division's senior command structure, including its headquarters company, as well as communications, intelligence, operational and support elements as well as the Division Band which provide services to any units assigned to the headquarters at a time.

Activated to oversee division elements prior to World War II, the battalion fought in Italy for a year. After the war it served as the command element for the 10th when it was a training unit. Due to reorganizations in the Army, the 10th Mountain Headquarters was activated with only a headquarters company in 1985, and served in numerous contingencies throughout the 1990s. During another Army reorganization in 2004, the 10th Mountain Division Headquarters Company was reestablished as the Division Special Troops Battalion (DSTB), "Gauntlet" on 13 September 2004 in accordance with Army Modularity. The DSTB was activated from elements of Headquarters and Headquarters Company, 3-62 ADA, 10th Signal BN, 110th MI BN, DISCOM, and DIVARTY. The new DSTB supported the 10th Mountain Division command elements when they deployed to both Operation Enduring Freedom in Afghanistan and Operation Iraqi Freedom in Iraq. During this service, it has received several commendations for its multiple deployments. In October 2009, the Special Troops Battalion was redesignated to Headquarters and Headquarters Battalion, 10th Mountain Division (Light Infantry), composed of Headquarters Support Company, Operations Company, Intelligence and Sustainment Company, Division Signal Company, and the 10th Mountain Division Band. Then in 2016 in accordance with the Army's re-alignment and re-shaping of the force, the battalion's companies were reduced and re-organized from five companies into just three - the Headquarters and Support Company, the Signal, Intelligence, and Sustainment Company, and the 10th Mountain Division Band.

== Organization ==
The 10th Mountain Division Headquarters and Headquarters Battalion is subordinate to the 10th Mountain Division, and is a permanent formation of the division, as the 10th Mountain Division's command elements are all contained within the HHBN. It is organized under the same uniform structure that all HHBNs in the United States Army conform to.

The battalion consists of three companies; the division's Headquarters Company, known as Headquarters and Support Company; Signal, Intelligence, and Sustainment Company; and the 10th Mountain Division Band. These companies provide services for the other elements under the 10th Mountain Division's command. As such, all of the formations are mountain warfare qualified.

== History ==
The Special Troops Battalion was activated on 6 November 1944, as an organizational structure for the command elements of the 10th Mountain Division. It was activated at Camp Swift, Texas, while the division was staging in preparation for deployment to Europe during World War II.

=== World War II ===
The 10th Light Division (Alpine) was constituted on 10 July 1943, and activated two days later at Camp Hale, Colorado. The division was centered around disciplined commands; the 85th Infantry Regiment, 86th Infantry Regiment, and 87th Infantry Regiment. Also allotted to the division were the 604th, 605th, and 616th Ground Artillery battalions, the 110th Signal Company, the 710th Ordnance Company, the 10th Quartermaster Company, the 10th Reconnaissance Troop, the 126th Engineer Battalion, the 10th Medical Battalion, and the 10th Counter-Intelligence Detachment. The 10th Light Division was unique in that it was the only division in the Army with three field artillery battalions instead of four.

The division trained for one year at the 9,200-foot-high Camp Hale. Soldiers trained to battle and stay alive under the most inhuman mountain circumstances, traveling on skis and show shoes, and sleeping in the snow devoid of tents. On 22 June 1944, the division was conveyed to Camp Swift, Texas to prepare for military exercises in Louisiana, which were later disregarded. A period of acclimation to a low altitude and hot climate was necessary to prepare for this training. On 6 November 1944, the 10th Division was redesignated the 10th Mountain Division. It was at this point that the Special Troops Battalion was initiated. That same month the blue and white "Mountain" tab was authorized for the division's new shoulder sleeve insignia.

==== Italy ====
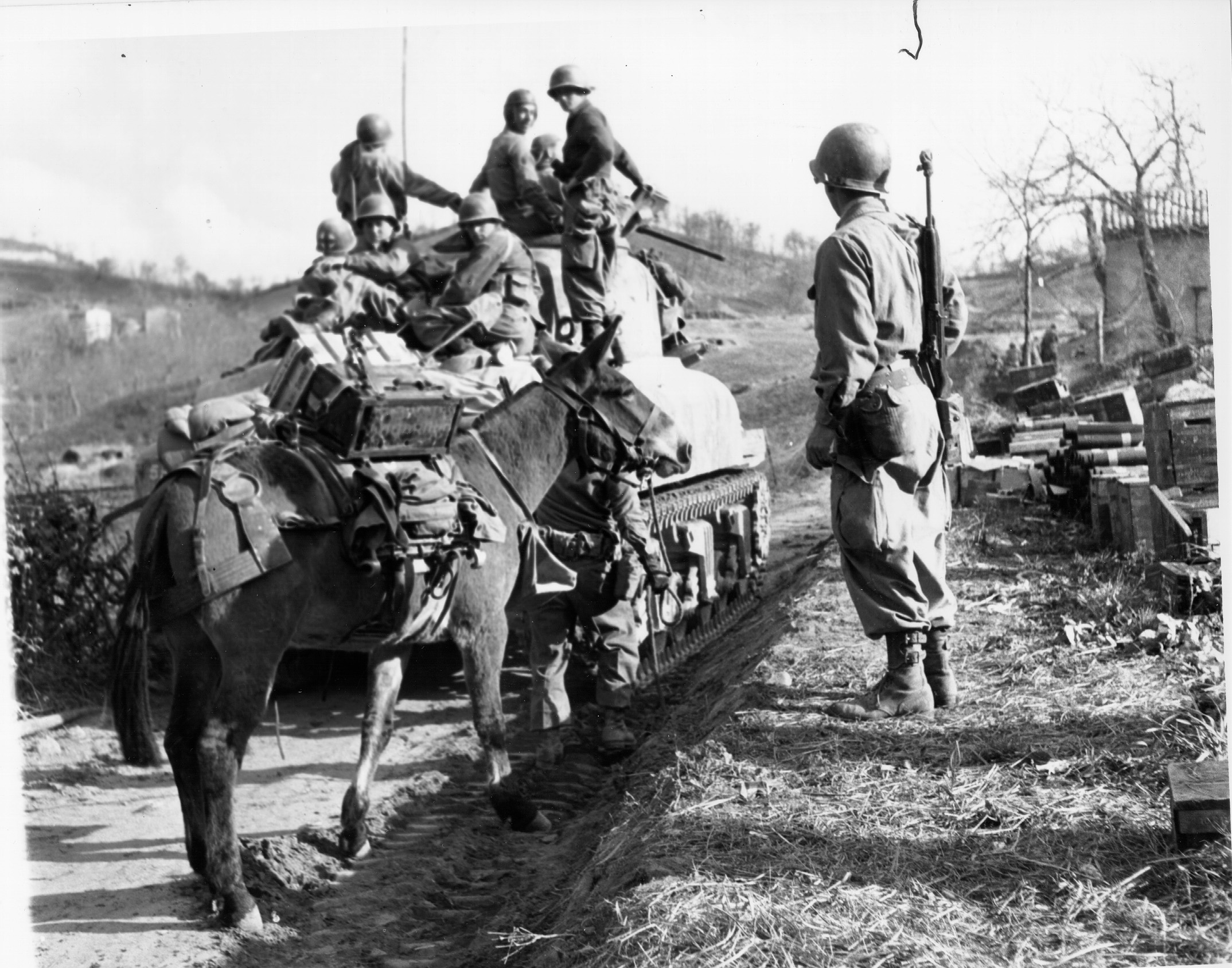
The division progressing in Italy, April 1945

The battalion and its division sailed for Italy in late 1944, arriving in Italy on 6 January 1945. It was the last US Army Division to enter warfare in World War II.

The battalion delivered command for the division as it instantaneously entered combat near Cutigliano and Orsigna. Preliminary defensive actions were followed on 19 February 1945 by Battle of Monte Castello in conjunction with troops of a Brazilian Expeditionary Force.

The unit made concerted attacks on the Monte Della Torraccia-Mount Belvedere sector, and the mountaintops were cleared after several days of hefty fighting. In early March the division brawled its way north of Canolle and moved to within 15 miles (24 km) of Bologna. Maintaining cautious positions for the next three weeks, the division jumped off again in April, captured Mongiorgio on 4/20, and entered the Po Valley, seizing the premeditated points Pradalbino and Bomporto. The 10th crossed the Po River on 23 April, reaching Verona on 25 April, and ran into heavy resistance at Torbole and Nago. After an amphibious crossing of Lake Garda, it secured Gargnano and Porto di Tremosine on 30 April, as German resistance in Italy ended. After the German surrender in Italy on 2 May 1945, the division went on security duty, receiving the surrender of various German units and screening the areas of occupation near Trieste, Kobarid, Bovec and Log pod Mangartom, Slovenia until V-E Day, the end of the war in Europe.

==== Demobilization ====
Initially, the battalion and division were to be sent to the Pacific theater to take part in Operation Downfall, the assault of inland Japan. Nonetheless, Japan surrendered in August 1945 following the atomic bombings of Hiroshima and Nagasaki. The division returned to the US two days after the surrender. All of its combat elements, as well as the Special Troops Battalion, were disbanded and neutralized on 30 November 1945, at Camp Carson, Colorado.

=== Cold War ===
In June 1948, the division was rebuilt and activated at Fort Riley, Kansas to serve as a training division. Without its "Mountain" tab, the division served at the 10th Infantry Division for the next ten years. The battalion was also rebuilt and delegated to commanding the training units. The division was charged with processing and training replacements in large numbers. This mission was expanded with the outbreak of the Korean War in 1950. By 1953, the division had trained 123,000 new Army recruits at Fort Riley.

In 1954, the division was converted to a combat division once again, though it did not regain its "Mountain" status. Using equipment from the deactivating 37th Infantry Division, the 10th Infantry Division was deployed to Germany, replacing the 1st Infantry Division at Würzburg, serving as part of the North Atlantic Treaty Organization defensive force. The division served in Germany for four years, until it was rotated out and replaced by the 3rd Infantry Division. On 1 July 1957, the battalion was redesignated as the 10th Administration Company. However, the company moved with the division to Fort Benning, Georgia, and was deactivated on 14 June 1958.

=== Reactivation ===
In 1985, when the 10th Mountain Division was reactivated again, the Special Troops Battalion was not made a part of the organizational structure, in accordance with the new format of US Army Divisions per the 1963 Reorganization Objective Army Divisions plan.

Upon the return of the division headquarters and 1st Brigade from Afghanistan after supporting Operation Enduring Freedom, the 10th Mountain Division began the process of transformation into a modular division. On 16 September 2004, the division headquarters finished its transformation, which returned the Special Troops Battalion to active service. The 1st Brigade became the 1st Brigade Combat Team, 10th Mountain Division, while the 3rd Brigade Combat Team, 10th Mountain Division was activated for the first time. In January 2005, the 4th Brigade Combat Team, 10th Mountain Division was activated at Fort Polk, Louisiana. 2nd Brigade Combat Team, 10th Mountain Division would not be transformed until September 2005, pending a deployment to Iraq. Around that time, the Special Troops Battalion received its heraldry, including a coat of arms and a distinctive unit insignia.

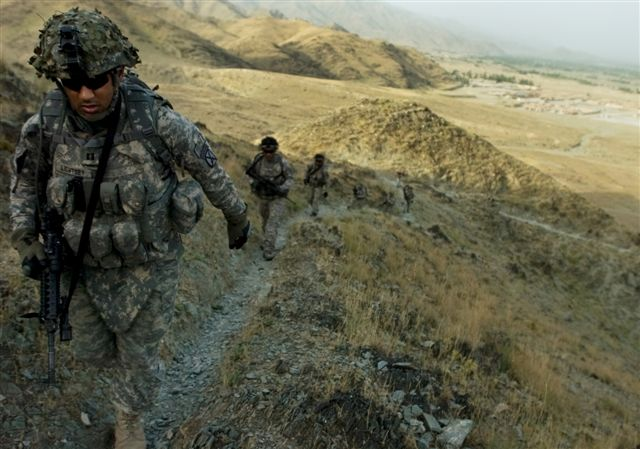
10th Mountain Division troops from the 1st Battalion, 32nd Infantry hike through Kunar Province.

The division headquarters and 3rd Brigade Combat Team redeployed to Afghanistan in 2006, staying in the country until 2007. The division and brigade served in the eastern region of the country, along the border with Pakistan, fulfilling a similar role as it did during its previous deployment. During this time, the deployment of the brigade was extended along with that of the 4th Brigade Combat Team, 82nd Airborne Division, however, it was eventually replaced by the 173rd Airborne Brigade Combat Team which was rerouted from Iraq.

After a one-year rest, the headquarters of the 10th Mountain Division was deployed to Iraq for the first time in April 2008, along with the 4th Brigade Combat Team. The division headquarters served as the command element for southern Baghdad, while the 4th BCT operated in North Baghdad. The 10th Mountain participated in larger scale operations such as Operation Phantom Phoenix. The headquarters of the 10th Mountain Division is currently deployed to Afghanistan in support of OEF XV and transitioning to the Resolute Support Mission in Afghanistan.

== Honors ==
The 10th Mountain Division Headquarters and Headquarters Battalion was awarded two campaign streamers in World War II and four campaign streamers in the war on terrorism for a total of six campaign streamers and two unit decorations in its operational history. Some of the division's brigades received more or fewer decorations depending on their individual deployments.

=== Campaign streamers ===
Conflict	Streamer	Year(s)
World War II	North Apennines	1945
World War II	Po Valley	1945
Operation Enduring Freedom	Afghanistan	2001–2002
Operation Enduring Freedom	Afghanistan	2003–2004
Operation Enduring Freedom	Afghanistan	2006–2007
Operation Iraqi Freedom	Iraq	2008–2009

== Sources ==
- Army Almanac: A Book of Facts Concerning the Army of the United States. United States Government Printing Office. 1959. OCLC 1022243.
