= Special Troops Battalion, 1st Brigade Combat Team, 10th Mountain Division =

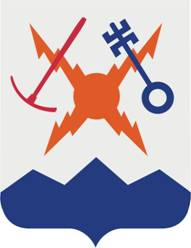
- Special Troops Battalion, 1st Brigade Combat Team, 10th Mountain Division coat of arms
- Active: 6 November 1944 – 30 November 1945; 1 July 1948 – 14 June 1958; 16 September 2004 – 17 October 2014
- Country: United States of America
- Allegiance: United States Army
- Branch: Active duty
- Type: Special troops battalion
- Role: Mountain warfare
- Size: Battalion
- Part of: 1st Brigade Combat Team, 10th Mountain Division
- Garrison/HQ: Fort Drum, New York
- Motto: Iroquois
- Engagements: Afghanistan Campaign; Iraq Campaign

Insignia
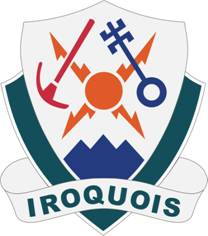
- Distinctive unit insignia

The 1st Brigade Combat Team, 10th Mountain Division Special Troops Battalion is a special troops battalion of the United States Army headquartered at Fort Drum, New York. It is the organization for the command elements of the 1st Brigade Combat Team, 10th Mountain Division. The battalion contains the division's senior command structure, including its Headquarters and Headquarters Company, as well as communication and support elements.

Tracing its lineage back to the mountain warfare training command activated during World War II, the battalion received credit for participation in two World War II campaigns. Formally activated in 2004, it has since seen two deployments supporting Operation Iraqi Freedom and Operation Enduring Freedom in support of the 1st Brigade Combat Team.

== Organization ==
The 1st Special Troops Battalion is subordinate to the 1st Brigade Combat Team, 10th Mountain Division, and is a permanent formation of the brigade, as the 1st Brigade Combat Team's command elements are all contained in the STB.

The battalion consists of four companies; the brigade's Headquarters and Headquarters Company, as well as A Company, a Combat Engineer company; B Company, a Military Intelligence company; C Company, a Signal company; and a Military Police platoon. These companies provide services for the other battalions of the 1st Brigade Combat Team. As such, all of the formations are mountain warfare qualified.

== History ==
Special Troops Battalion, 1st Brigade, 10th Mountain Division traces its lineage back to the 10th Mountain Division's original Headquarters element, which was constituted with the rest of the division in World War II. It was activated 17 September 1942 as the 10th Mountain Training Center. After the training of the Division's soldiers was complete, the Training Center became the division headquarters. The division headquarters then fought through the Italian campaign, earning two campaign streamers during its service.

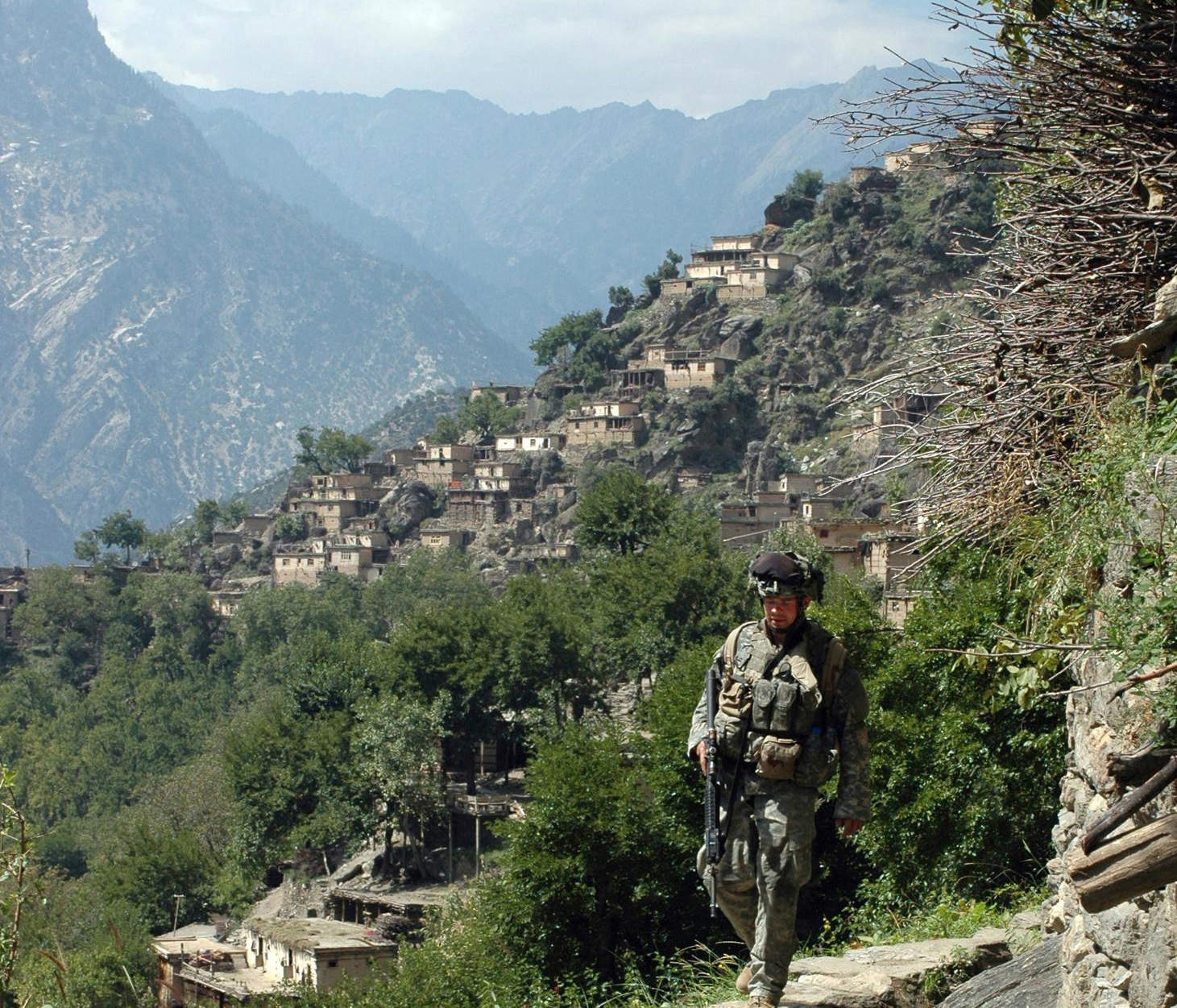
10th Mountain Soldier on patrol in Nuristan Province.

Upon the return of the division headquarters and 1st Brigade, the 10th Mountain Division began the process of transformation into a modular division. On 16 September 2004, the division headquarters finished its transformation. The 1st Brigade became the 1st Brigade Combat Team, while the 3rd Brigade Combat Team, 10th Mountain Division was activated for the first time. In January 2005, the 4th Brigade Combat Team, 10th Mountain Division was activated at Fort Polk, Louisiana. 2nd Brigade Combat Team would not be transformed until September 2005, pending a deployment to Iraq.

In late 2004, 2nd Brigade Combat Team was deployed to Iraq supporting Operation Iraqi Freedom. The 2nd Brigade Combat Team undertook combat operations in western Baghdad, returning to the US in late 2005. Around that time, the 1st Brigade Combat Team deployed back to Iraq, staying in the country until 2006.

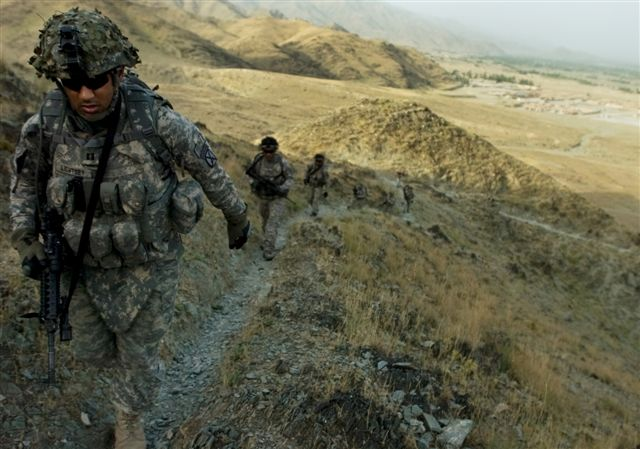
10th Mountain Division troops from the 1st Battalion, 32nd Infantry hike through Kunar Province.

The 1st Brigade Combat Team and the 2nd Brigade Combat Team are scheduled to deploy to Iraq in the fall of 2009, as a part of the 2009–2010 rotation to Iraq. The Army is currently expanding housing at Fort Drum, hoping to relocate the home base of the 4th Brigade Combat Team from Fort Polk to Fort Drum before 2013.

== Honors ==
The Special Troops Battalion, 1st Brigade, 10th Mountain Division was awarded two campaign streamers in World War II and two campaign streamers in the War on Terrorism for a total of four campaign streamers and two unit decorations in its operational history. Note that some of the brigade's battalions received more or fewer decorations depending on their individual deployments.

=== Unit decorations ===
Ribbon	Award	Year	Notes
	Meritorious Unit Commendation (Army)	2003–2004	for service in Afghanistan
	Meritorious Unit Commendation (Army)	2005–2006	for service in Iraq

=== Campaign streamers ===
Conflict	Streamer	Year(s)
World War II	North Apennines	1944
World War II	Po Valley	1945
Operation Enduring Freedom	Afghanistan	2003–2004
Operation Iraqi Freedom	Iraq	2005–2006
Operation Iraqi Freedom	Iraq	2007–2008
Operation Enduring Freedom	Afghanistan	2010–2011
