= Firebase Wilderness =

Combat Outpost/Firebase Wilderness
- Gerda Serai District, Paktia Province, Afghanistan
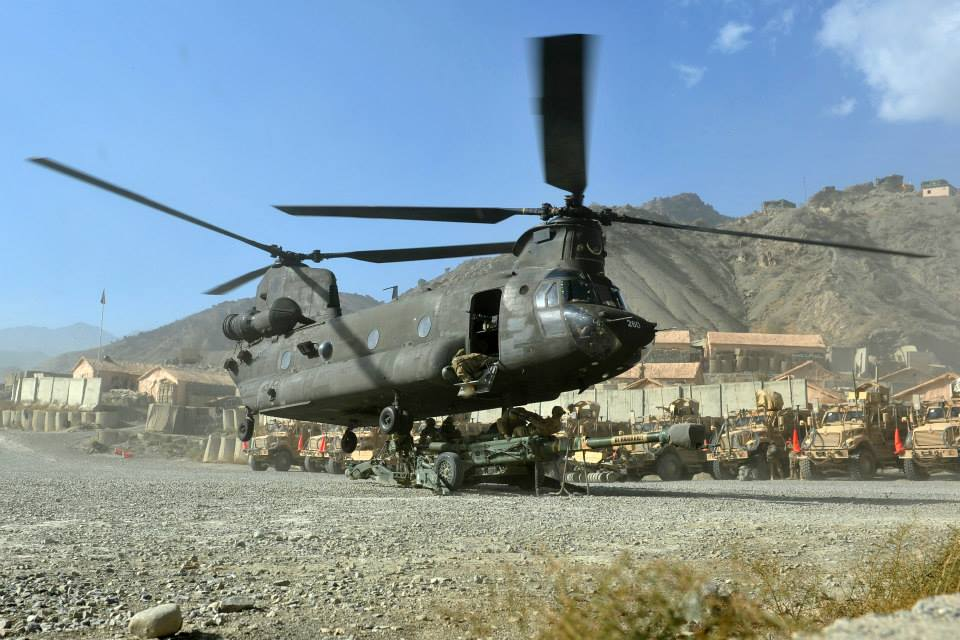
- A M777 155 mm howitzer being sling-loaded to a CH-47 Chinook helicopter at Combat Outpost Wilderness, Afghanistan, Oct. 31, 2013

Site information
- Type: Fire Support Base
- Controlled by: United States; United States Army

Location
- Approximate location of COP/FB Wilderness
- Location within Afghanistan
- Coordinates: 33.28°N 69.22°E

Site history
- Built: 2006
- Built by: Special Troops Battalion, 3rd BCT, 10th MTN DIV
- In use: 2006–2013
- Battles/wars: Operation Enduring Freedom

Garrison information
- Garrison: 3rd BCT, 10th MTN DIV; 4th BCT, 82nd ABN DIV; 4th BCT, 101st ABN DIV; 4th BCT, 25th INF DIV; 3rd BCT, 101st ABN DIV; 3rd BCT, 1st INF DIV
- Occupants: 203rd Corps, ANA; Embedded Training Teams

Firebase Wilderness, also known as Forward Operating Base Tellier, was a joint U.S.-Afghan outpost in Afghanistan, in the Gerda Serai District of Paktia Province.

== Overview ==
The strategic position of FB Wilderness enabled U.S. and Afghan forces to provide security along the Khost-Gardez Pass, a critical route through the Sulaiman Mountains, which connects downtown Khost to Gardez City. FB Wilderness was first occupied in late 2006 after being built from scratch by elements of 3rd Brigade Special Troops Battalion, 3rd Brigade Combat Team, 10th Mountain Division. FB Wilderness then served as a base of operations for U.S. military elements, Afghan National Army soldiers from 1st Brigade, 203rd ANA Corps, and Afghan regional policemen. During the Soviet invasion of Afghanistan in the 1980s, the area of the K-G Pass that Wilderness occupied was the site of frequent mujahedeen attacks on convoys including the Battle for Hill 3234. The historically hostile region was considered a hotbed of activity, especially during the summer months when insurgent forces often targeted Wilderness with mortars and rockets.

In 2007, 82nd Airborne Division paratroopers from 4th Squadron, 73rd Cavalry Regiment and based at FB Wilderness, renamed the firebase to FOB Tellier in honor of their fallen brother, Sergeant Zachary D. Tellier. During a gun battle with insurgent forces in the vicinity of FB Wilderness, SGT Tellier was fatally wounded on Sept. 29, 2007.

In October 2008, the CBS news program 60 Minutes aired a report by Lara Logan from FB Wilderness titled "Afghanistan: Fighting In A "'Hornet's Nest'".

== U.S. military occupants ==
Since its establishment in December 2006, U.S. Army units have assumed control of Wilderness, including:

- 3rd BCT, 10th Mountain Division
- 508th Parachute Infantry Regiment, 82nd Airborne Division
- 506th Infantry Regiment, 101st Airborne Division
- 4th BCT, 25th Infantry Division
- 187th Infantry Regiment, 101st Airborne Division
- C Troop 1-61 Cavalry
- B Troop, and D Troop, 6th Squadron, 4th Cavalry Regiment, 3rd Brigade Combat Team, 1st Infantry Division
- A Battery 1st platoon 1st Battalion 6th Field Artillery Regiment, 3rd Brigade Combat Team, 1st Infantry Division
- A Battery, 1st Platoon, 4th Battalion, 320th Field Artillery Regiment, 4th Brigade Combat Team, 101st Airborne Division

== See also ==
- List of ISAF installations in Afghanistan
