= 2nd Brigade Combat Team, 10th Mountain Division =

- Insignia of the 10th Mountain Division
- Active: 1985 – present
- Country: United States of America
- Branch: United States Army
- Type: Infantry brigade combat team
- Role: Offensive, defensive and stability operations
- Size: Brigade
- Part of: 10th Mountain Division
- Garrison/HQ: Fort Drum, New York, U.S.
- Nickname: Commandos
- Mottos: "Courage and Honor"
- Anniversaries: 2 October 1985 – Activation of the Brigade at Ft. Benning, GA
- Engagements: War in Southwest Asia; Armed Forces Expeditions – Somalia; War in Afghanistan; Iraq War

Commanders
- Current commander: Colonel Anthony Gore
- Command Sergeant Major: CSM Alexander King

The 2nd Brigade Combat Team, 10th Mountain Division is an infantry Brigade Combat Team of the United States Army based at Fort Drum, New York. It is a subordinate unit of the 10th Mountain Division.

Activated in 1985, the 10th Mountain Division's second brigade's elements saw numerous deployments to contingencies around the world in the 1990s. With the global war on terrorism the brigade has deployed six times: initially deployed to Uzbekistan, Kuwait and Qatar in 2001, elements of the brigade later deployed from Uzbekistan into Afghanistan; the brigade deployed again in early 2003, split across Iraq, Afghanistan and the Horn of Africa; the entire brigade returned to Iraq in 2004–2005, 2006–2007 and 2009–2010 before returning to Afghanistan in 2013 for its sixth deployment.

== Organization ==
The 2nd Brigade Combat Team is a subordinate unit of the 10th Mountain Division. however, its modular nature means it is capable of operating independently of the division's Headquarters and Headquarters Company.

As an infantry brigade combat team (IBCT), the brigade consists of a Headquarters and Headquarters Company or HHC, a squadron, and several subordinate battalions stationed at Fort Drum, New York:

- 2nd Battalion, 14th Infantry Regiment
- 4th Battalion, 31st Infantry Regiment
- 2nd Battalion, 87th Infantry Regiment
- 1st Squadron, 89th Cavalry Regiment
- 2nd Battalion, 15th Field Artillery Regiment (2–15th FAR)
- 41st Brigade Engineer Battalion
- 210th Brigade Support Battalion (210th BSB)

== History ==
On 13 February 1985, the 10th Mountain Division (Light Infantry) was activated at Fort Drum, New York, after several decades inactive. In accordance with the Reorganization Objective Army Divisions plan, the division was no longer centered on regiments, instead two brigades were activated under the division. The 1st Brigade, 10th Mountain Division was activated at Fort Drum while the 2nd Brigade, 10th Mountain Division was activated at Fort Benning, moving to Fort Drum in 1988. The division was also assigned a round-out brigade from the Army National Guard, the 27th Infantry Brigade. The division was specially designed as a light infantry division able to rapidly deploy. Equipment design was oriented toward reduced size and weight for reasons of both strategic and tactical mobility. The division also received a distinctive unit insignia.

=== Contingencies ===
In 1990, the division sent 1,200 soldiers to support Operation Desert Storm. The largest of these units was the 548th Supply and Services Battalion with almost 1,000 soldiers, which supported the 24th Infantry Division (Mechanized) in Iraq. Following a cease-fire in March 1991, the support soldiers began redeploying to Fort Drum through June of that year.

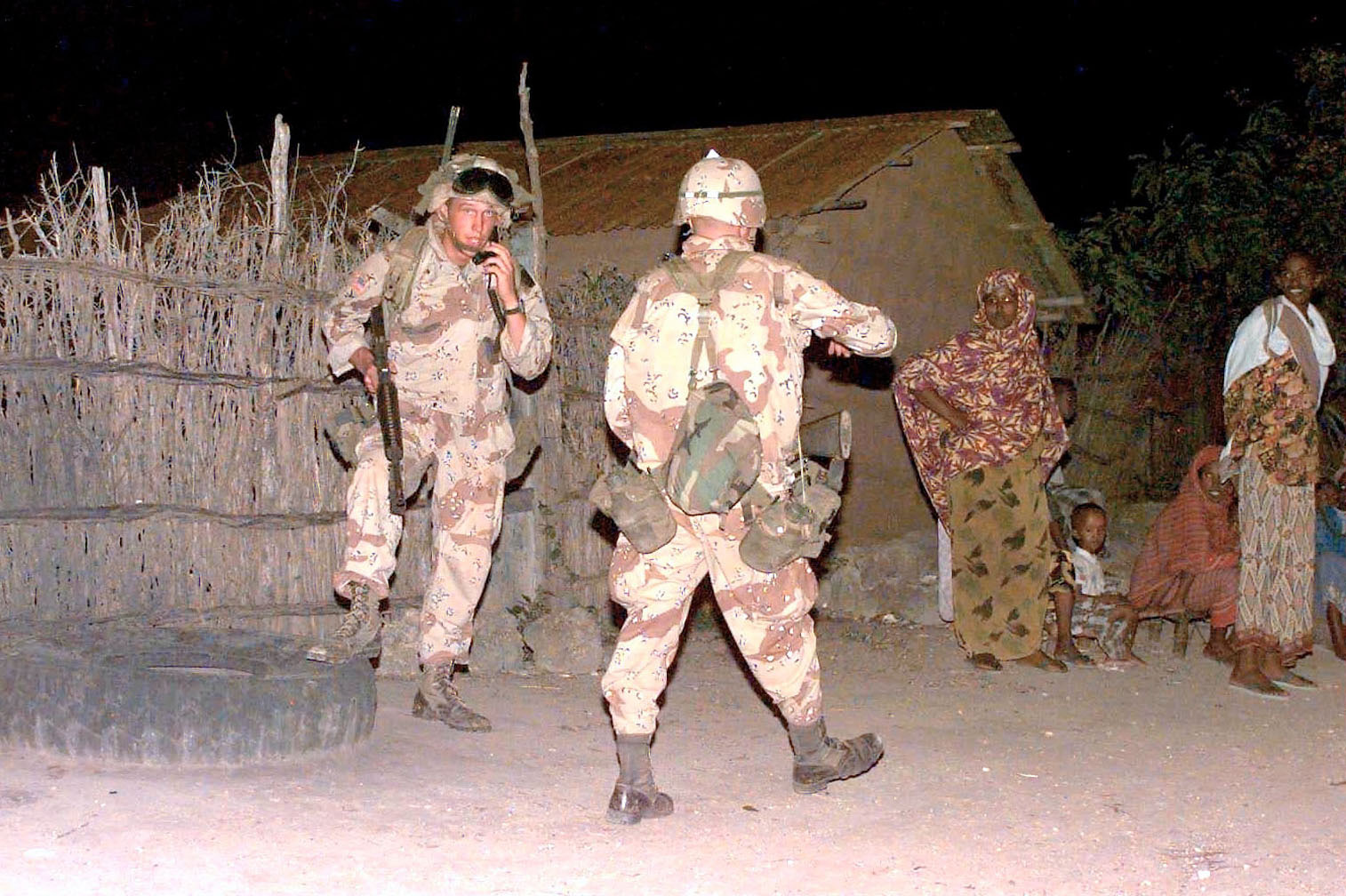
Soldiers of the 10th Mountain Division sweep a Somali village for weapons (1993).

Hurricane Andrew struck South Florida on 24 August 1992, killing 13 people, leaving another 250,000 homeless and causing damages in excess of 20 billion dollars. On 27 September 1992, the 10th Mountain Division assumed responsibility for Hurricane Andrew disaster relief as Task Force Mountain. Division soldiers set up relief camps, distributed food, clothing, medical necessities and building supplies, as well as helping to rebuild homes and clear debris. The last of the 6,000 division soldiers to deploy to Florida returned home in October 1992.

==== Operation Restore Hope ====
On 3 December 1992, the division headquarters was designated as the headquarters for all Army forces (ARFOR) of the Unified Task Force (UNITAF) for Operation Restore Hope. Major General Steven L. Arnold, the division commander, was named Army forces commander. The 10th Mountain Division's mission was to secure major cities and roads to provide safe passage of relief supplies to the Somali population suffering from the effects of the Somali Civil War. Due to 10th Mountain Division efforts, humanitarian agencies declared an end to the food emergency and factional fighting decreased. When Task Force Ranger and the SAR team were pinned down during a raid in what later became known as the Battle of Mogadishu, 10th Mountain units provided infantry for the UN quick reaction force sent to rescue them. The 10th had 2 soldiers killed in the fighting, which was the longest sustained firefight by regular U.S. Army forces since the Vietnam War. The division began a gradual reduction of forces in Somalia in February 1993, until the last soldiers of the 2nd Battalion, 22nd Infantry returned to the United States in March 1994.

==== Operation Uphold Democracy ====
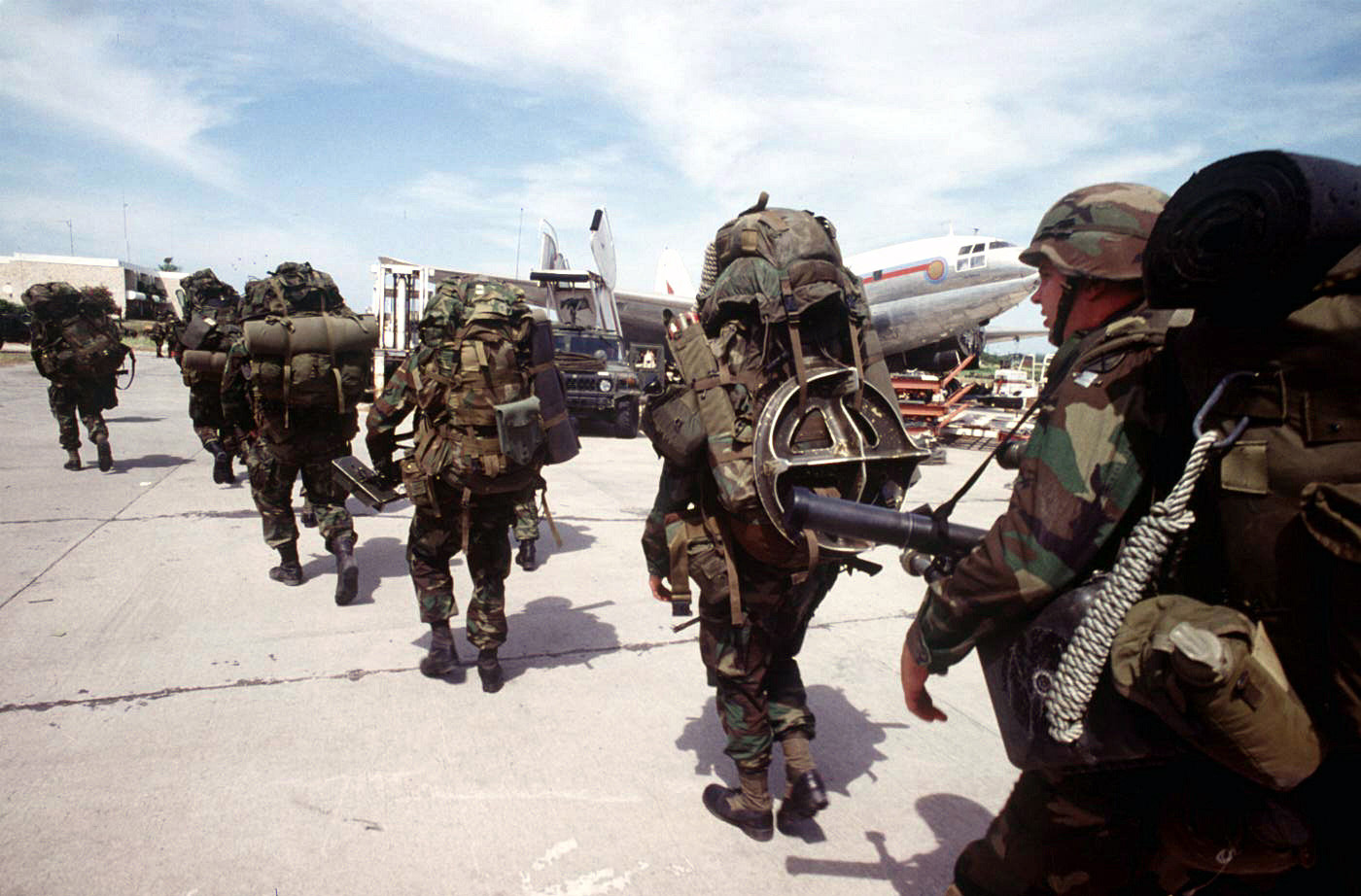
Soldiers of the 10th Mountain Division secure Port-au-Prince International Airport in 1994.

The division formed the nucleus of the Multinational Force Haiti (MNF Haiti) and Joint Task Force 190 (JTF 190) in Haiti during Operation Uphold Democracy. More than 8,600 of the division's troops deployed during this operation. On 19 September 1994, the 1st Brigade conducted the Army's first air assault from an aircraft carrier. This force consisted of 54 helicopters and almost 2,000 soldiers. They occupied the Port-au-Prince International Airport. This was the largest Army air operation conducted from a carrier since the Doolittle Raid in World War II.

The division's mission was to create a secure and stable environment so the government of Haitian President Jean-Bertrand Aristide could be reestablished and democratic elections held. After this was accomplished, the 10th Mountain Division handed over control of the MNF-Haiti to the 25th Infantry Division on 15 January 1995. The Division redeployed the last of its soldiers who served in Haiti by 31 January 1995.

==== Task Force Eagle ====
In the fall of 1998, the division received notice that it would be serving as senior headquarters of Task Force Eagle, providing a peacekeeping force to support the ongoing operation within the Multi-National Division-North area of responsibility in Bosnia and Herzegovina. Selected division units began deploying in late summer, approximately 3,000 division soldiers deployed. After successfully performing their mission in Bosnia, the division units conducted a Transfer of Authority, relinquishing their assignments to soldiers of the 49th Armored Division, Texas National Guard. By early summer 2000, all 10th Mountain Division soldiers had returned safely to Fort Drum.

=== Global war on terrorism ===
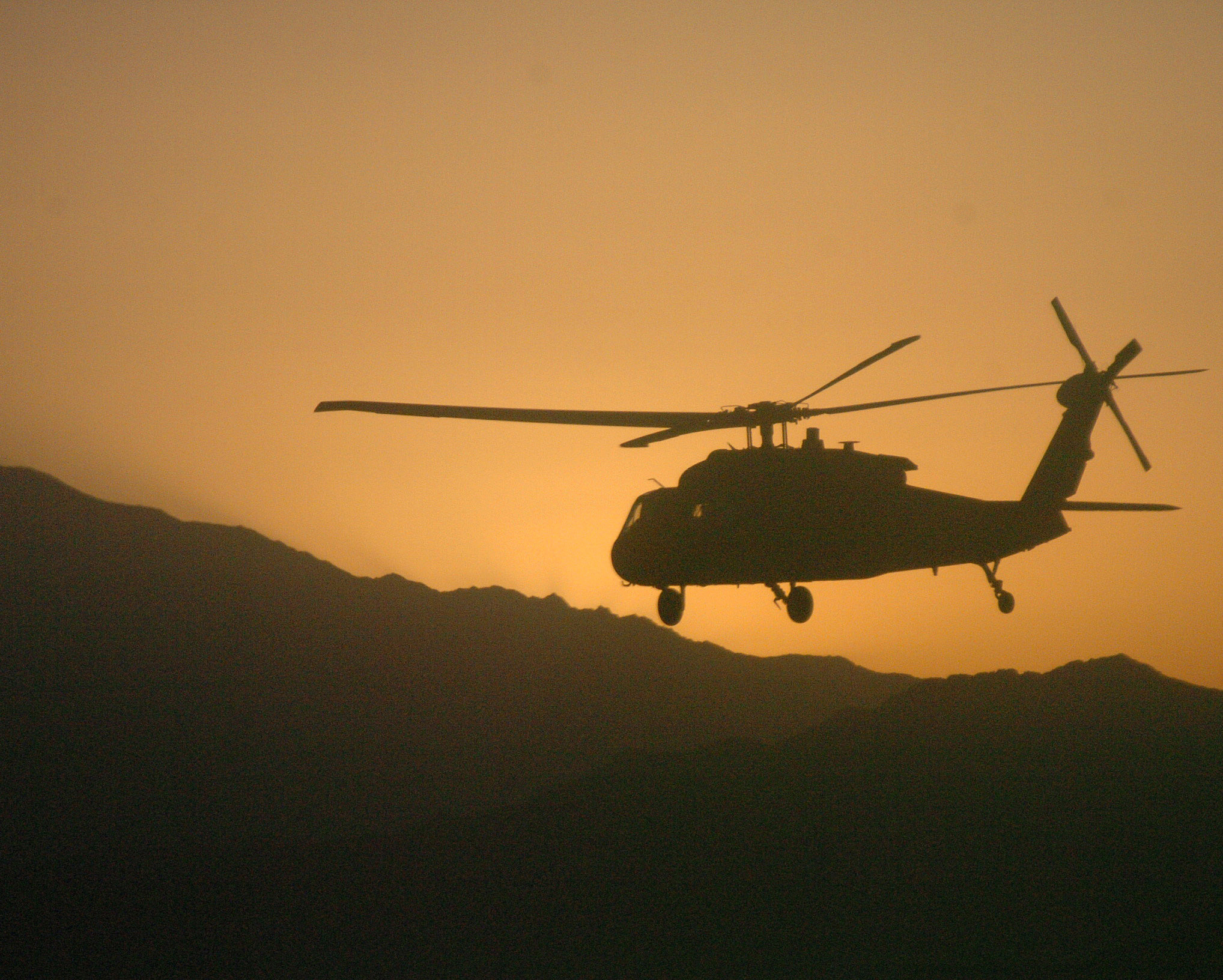
A UH-60 Black Hawk helicopter carries soldiers from the 10th Mountain Division on a mission in Afghanistan.

Following the 11 September 2001 attacks, elements of the division, including its special troops battalion and the 1-87th Infantry and 4th Battalion, 31st Infantry Regiment (4–31 Infantry), deployed to Afghanistan in support of Operation Enduring Freedom in late 2001. These forces remained in the country until mid-2002, fighting to secure remote areas of the country and participating in operations such as Operation Anaconda, the Fall of Mazar-i-Sharif, and the Battle of Qala-i-Jangi. The division also participated in fighting in the Shahi Khot Valley in 2002. Upon the return of the battalions, they were welcomed home and praised by President Bush. In 2003, elements of the 2nd Brigade Combat Team, 10th Mountain Division returned to Afghanistan to support US forces operating in the western region of the country.

Upon the return of the division headquarters and 1st Brigade, the 10th Mountain Division began the process of transformation into a modular division. On 16 September 2004, the division headquarters finished its transformation. The 1st Brigade became the 1st Brigade Combat Team, while the 3rd Brigade Combat Team, 10th Mountain Division was activated for the first time. In January 2005, the 4th Brigade Combat Team, 10th Mountain Division was activated at Fort Polk, Louisiana. 2nd Brigade Combat Team would not be transformed until September 2005, pending a deployment to Iraq.

In late 2004, 2nd Brigade Combat Team was deployed to Iraq supporting Operation Iraqi Freedom. The 2nd Brigade Combat Team undertook combat operations in Baghdad including the Green Zone and Ahub Grab prison camp, returning to the US in late 2005. Around that time, the 1st Brigade Combat Team deployed back to Iraq, staying in the country until 2006. In August 2006, 2nd Brigade Combat Team began a 15-month deployment to Iraq.

The 1st Brigade Combat Team and the 2nd Brigade Combat Team were scheduled to deploy to Iraq in fall 2009, as a part of the 2009–2010 rotation to Iraq. As of summer 2009, it was one of only a few brigades in the U.S. Army to be deployed 40 months or more in support of the war on terrorism.

In 2015, about 1,200 members of the 2nd Brigade Combat Team deployed to southern Afghanistan as part of the Resolute Support Mission. It was the brigade's fourth deployment to Afghanistan.

== Honors ==
=== Unit decorations ===
Ribbon	Award	Year	Notes
	Meritorious Unit Commendation (Army)	2004–2005	for service in Iraq
	Meritorious Unit Commendation (Army)	2009–2010	for service in Iraq

=== Campaign streamers ===
Conflict	Streamer	Year(s)
Operation Iraqi Freedom	Iraq	2004–2005 2006–2007

== Sources ==
- McGrath, John J. (2004). The Brigade: A History: Its Organization and Employment in the US Army. Combat Studies Institute Press. ISBN 978-1-4404-4915-4.
- Army Almanac: A Book of Facts Concerning the Army of the United States. United States Government Printing Office. 1959. ASIN B0006D8NKK.
