= Cheyenne Mountain Division =

Coordinates: 38.7442°N 104.8468°W

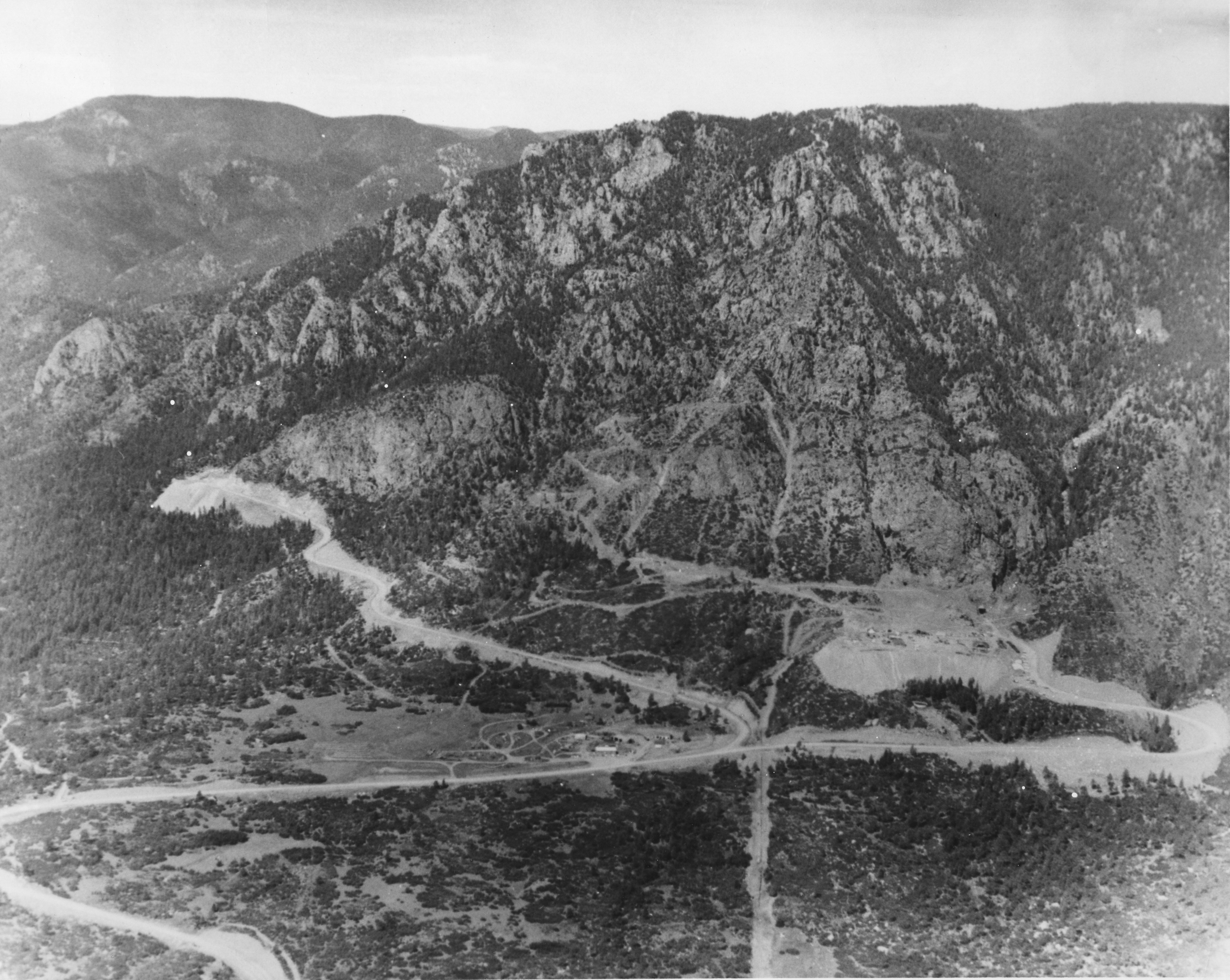
- Cheyenne Mountain Complex within Colorado Springs and on Cheyenne Mountain includes the serpentine access road (NORAD Rd, left-to-right) to the parking area (right of center) near the tunnel entrance (small black rectangle). NORAD Rd provides access to the south portal road (diagonally toward left) and to a SH 115 interchange (not shown) on the west side of Fort Carson.
- Active: July 28, 2006 - present
- Country: United States, Canada
- Type: North American Aerospace Defense Command and United States Northern Command unit
- Part of: North American Aerospace Defense Command
- Garrison/HQ: Cheyenne Mountain Air Force Station; El Paso County, Colorado; SSW of Colorado Springs

The Cheyenne Mountain Division (Note: Cheyenne Mountain Division was also the name of an urban area, including Ivywild, Colorado, in the 1960 United States Federal Census and in 1999 was considered a subdivision in Colorado Springs, Colorado.) is the J36 branch within the North American Aerospace Defense Command (NORAD) and United States Northern Command's (USNORTHCOM) Operations Directorates, located in Colorado Springs, Colorado.

It was re-designated as the Cheyenne Mountain Division on July 28, 2006, previously having been designated the Cheyenne Mountain Directorate. (Note: Since July 2006, it still is sometimes referred to as the Cheyenne Mountain Directorate. It was called the Cheyenne Mountain Directorate in a 2007 Government Accounting Office report GAO-07-803R about Defense Infrastructure.) Before that, the unit was known as the Cheyenne Mountain Operations Center.

The organization, one of the tenants at the Cheyenne Mountain Air Force Station, has been responsible for monitoring North American air space for missiles and other space events that could pose a threat to North America. It operated within the Cheyenne Mountain Complex's Air Warning, Missile Correlation, Command Center, Space Control, and Operations Intelligence Watch Centers. The division assisted with establishing the integrated NORAD and USNORTHCOM Command Center at Peterson Air Force Base. Operational functions—such as monitoring for threats in the ocean, skies, and space—were moved to Peterson AFB from the Cheyenne Mountain Complex to reduce operating costs. On May 12, 2008, the fiftieth anniversary of the NORAD agreement, the Cheyenne Mountain Complex was designated as the NORAD and USNORTHCOM Alternate Command Center. The Cheyenne Mountain Division then became the J36 branch within the NORAD and USNORTHCOM's Operations Directorates.
