= 25th Field Artillery Regiment =

US military unit

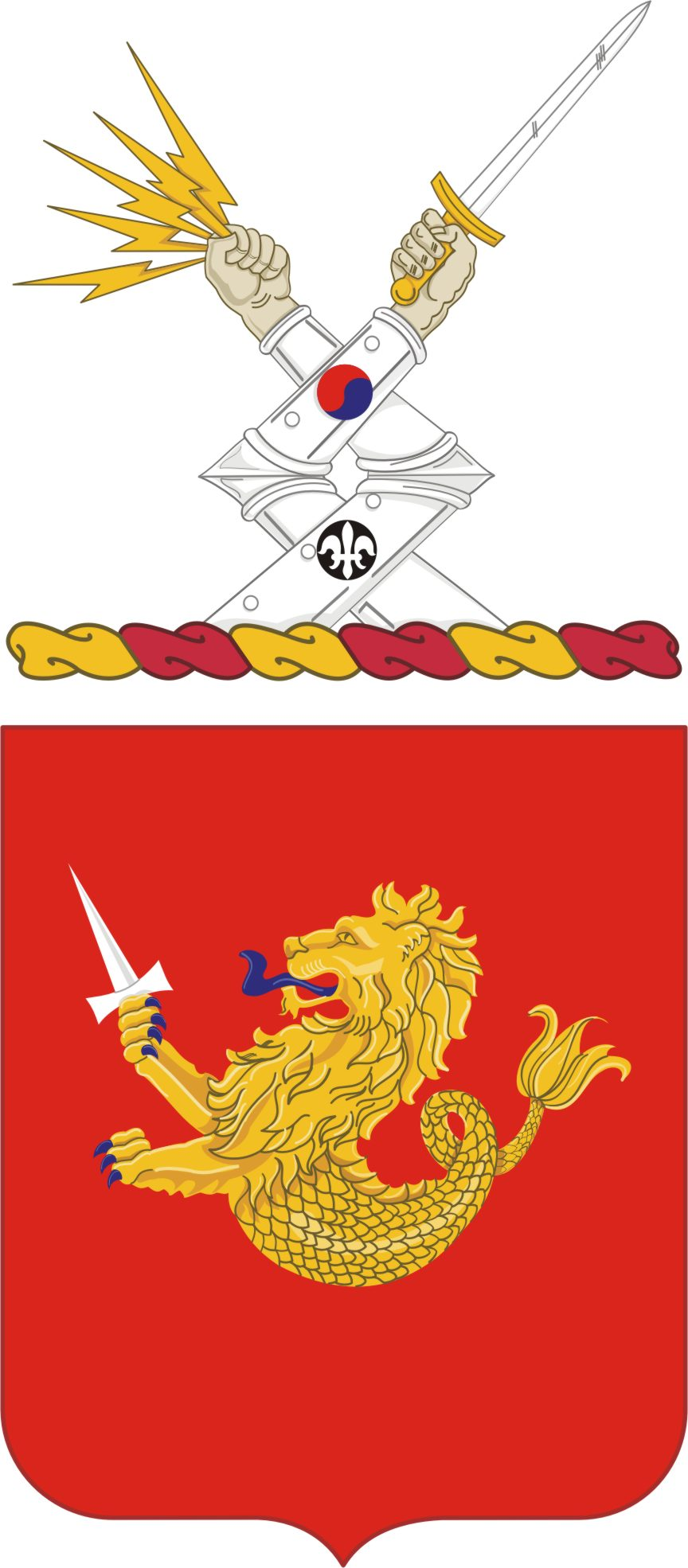
- TACE ET FACE
- Active: 1918–present
- Country: United States
- Branch: Army
- Type: Field artillery
- Garrison/HQ: 5th Battalion - Fort Johnson, LA
- Mottos: "Tace et Face" (Be Silent and Act)
- Equipment: M119A3 105 mm howitzer, M777A2 155 mm howitzer, Q-53 radar

Commanders
- 5th Battalion Commander: LTC Jamie L. Neely

Insignia
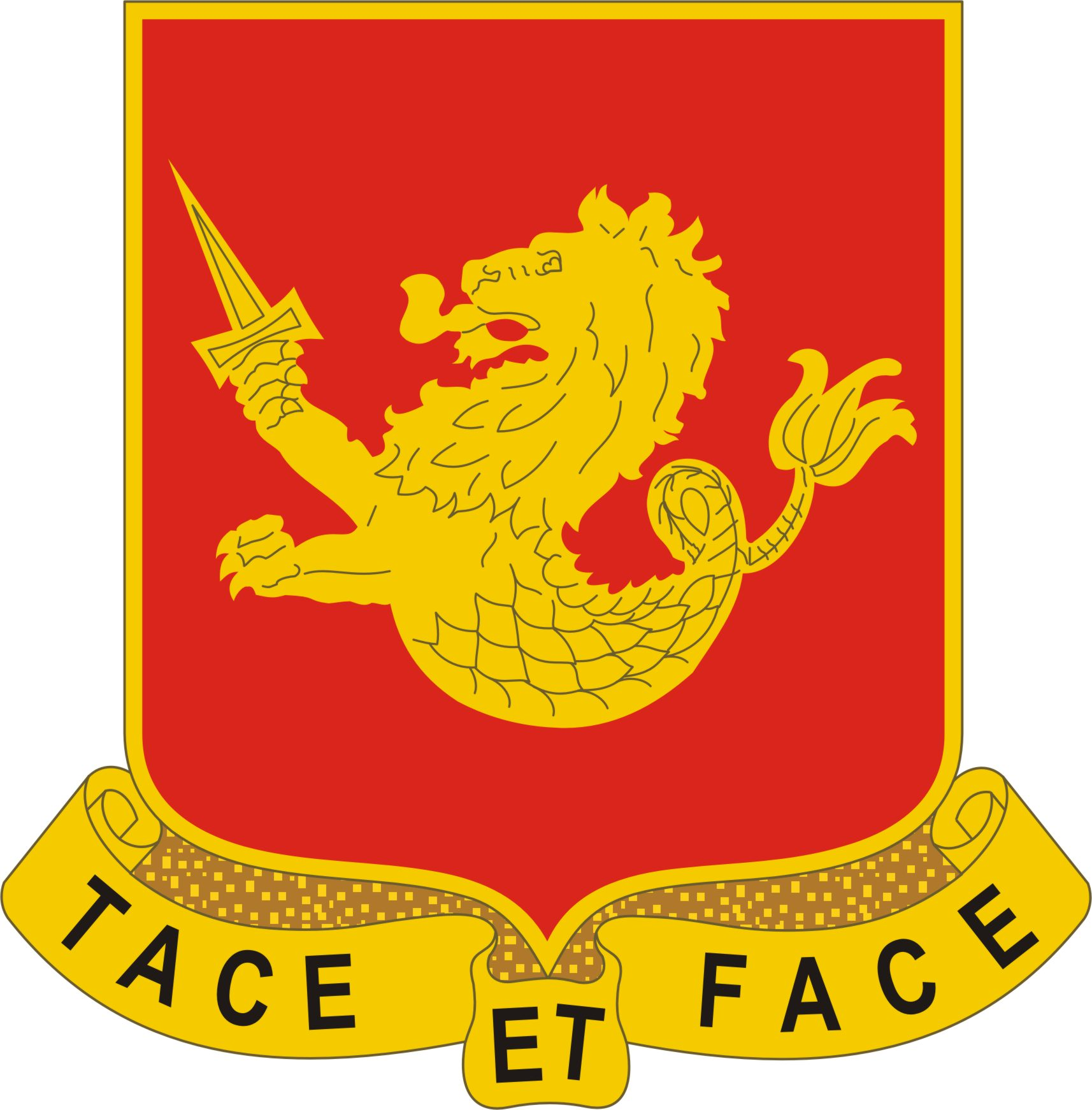
- Distinctive unit insignia

The 25th Field Artillery Regiment is a field artillery regiment of the United States Army, first constituted 5 July 1918 in the National Army (USA). Although the regiment did not see action during World War I, elements participated in World War II, Vietnam, Panama (including Operation Just Cause), the Gulf War, and the global war on terrorism. Currently the regiment one active battalion, a towed light artillery units equipped with the M119A3 105 mm howitzer and the M777A2 155 mm howitzer. The 5th Battalion is assigned to the 3rd Brigade Combat Team, 10th Mountain Division at Fort Johnson, Louisiana. The 4th Battalion was inactivated on 14 August 2014.

== 4th Battalion history ==
=== World War I and interwar period ===
The 4th Battalion, 25th Field Artillery traces its history to Battery D, 25th Field Artillery Regiment, which was originally constituted on 5 July 1918 in the National Army as part of the 25th Field Artillery Regiment in the 9th Infantry Division. The unit did not see action during World War One. Following the conclusion of the war, the battery was demobilized on 8 February 1919 at Camp McClellan, Alabama. The unit was reconstituted in the Regular Army on 22 December 1920 as Battery D, 25th Field Artillery Regiment (Philippine Scouts) at Fort William McKinley, Philippine Islands. Along with the 31st Infantry Regiment and other units, the regiment formed part of the Philippine Division. As part of the Philippine Division, the regiment was made up of mostly native Filipinos assigned to the United States Army Philippine Department, under the command of American officers. On 1 January 1930 the 25th Field Artillery Regiment was relieved of duty with the Philippine Division and reassigned to the 9th Infantry Division (inactive). At this time the regiment dropped the Philippine Scout designation that it had had since 1920. On 1 December 1934 the 25th Field Artillery Regiment was activated at Madison Barracks, New York.

=== World War II ===
During the expansion of the United States Army in preparation for World War II, the unit was reorganized on 30 December 1940 as Battery A, 25th Field Artillery Battalion. On 19 December 1942 the unit was again reconstituted as Battery A, 604th Field Artillery Battalion and assigned to Camp Carson, Colorado as part of the newly formed 10th Infantry Division (Mountain). As part of the 10th Mountain Division, the unit departed the United States for the European Theater of Operations, arriving in Italy in January 1945. During World War II the unit earned campaign streamers for actions in the North Apennines, Po Valley, Rhineland, Ardennes-Alsace, and Central Europe. Following the conclusion of World War II in both Europe and the Pacific, Battery A, 604th Field Artillery Battalion was redesignated as Battery A, 25th Field Artillery Battalion and shortly thereafter inactivated.

=== Post-war ===
On 29 November 1949 Battery A, 25th Field Artillery Regiment was redesignated as Battery A, 25th Parachute Field Artillery Battalion and consolidated with the 25th Field Artillery Battalion. The consolidated unit was assigned to the 10th Light Infantry Division (formerly 10th Mountain Division) until inactivated on 1 July 1957 and relieved from the 10th Light Infantry Division. During this time, from 1948 to 1953, the 10th Infantry Division served as a training organization at Fort Riley, Kansas. 10th Infantry Division was deployed to Germany, replacing the 1st Infantry Division at Würzburg, serving as part of the North Atlantic Treaty Organization defensive force. The division served in Germany for four years, until it was rotated out and replaced by the 3rd Infantry Division. The division moved to Fort Benning, Georgia and was inactivated on 14 June 1958

=== Vietnam War and after ===
On 31 July 1959 the unit was redesignated as HHB, 4th Battalion, 25th Field Artillery Regiment and later redesignated on 19 June 1964 as Battery D, 25th Field Artillery Regiment. The unit was activated 25 June 1964 in Germany but again shortly inactivated on 5 June 1967 in Germany. On 25 September 1969 Battery D, 25th Field Artillery Regiment was activated in the Republic of Vietnam where it saw action and earned campaign credit for participation in the "Sanctuary Counteroffensive" and "Counteroffensive, Phase VII" operations. Battery D, 25th Field Artillery Regiment was again inactivated on 1 August 1970 in Vietnam.

On 21 June 1976 Battery D, 25th Field Artillery Regiment was assigned to the 1st Infantry Division and activated at Fort Riley, Kansas where it remained in active service until 1 July 1995 when it was again inactivated. During that time D Battery fought in Operation Desert Storm as a target acquisition battery in the 1st Infantry Division. Battery H had a RADAR section participate in Operation Just Cause in 1989.

=== Global war on terrorism ===
The 4th Battalion, 25th Field Artillery was reactivated as the direct support fires battalion for 3rd Brigade Combat Team, 10th Mountain Division 16 September 2004 as part of the transformation of the 10th Mountain Division into a modular BCT division. This was the first time since 1957 that the unit again found itself a part of the Army's 10th Mountain Division. Since modularization, the battalion has been organized in a "2 x 8" structure, meaning that the battalion has two firing batteries (Alpha and Bravo) of eight M119A2 howitzers each, in addition to a headquarters battery and a forward support company.

The battalion deployed with 3rd Brigade Combat Team, 10th Mountain Division to Afghanistan in 2006–2007.

The battalion deployed with 3rd Brigade again in 2009. During this deployment, the brigade assumed responsibility over a number of provinces in eastern Afghanistan under the control of Regional Command East, and the 4th Battalion, 25th Field Artillery provided artillery fires for the brigade using the M777 towed 155 mm howitzer.

In March 2011, the battalion again deployed, this time to Kandahar Province, southern Afghanistan in support of Operation Enduring Freedom XI-XII. Although the battalion deployed to Afghanistan with their howitzers, the unit did not perform a firing mission and was instead utilized as a maneuver, "battle space owner" alongside the brigade's infantry battalions. The battalion operated in the Maywand District of Kandahar Province. Throughout the deployment, battalion headquarters were located at Forward Operating Base (FOB) Azzizulah with Alpha Battery at Combat Outpost (COP) Azimjan Kariz and Bravo Battery at COP Ghundy Ghar. To conduct their maneuver missions, Alpha Battery was reinforced with a platoon from the attached 2nd Battalion, 34th Armor Regiment, and Bravo Battery was reinforced with a platoon from the brigade's own 2nd Battalion, 87th Infantry Regiment.

The battalion's final deployment was in 2013–2014, returning to eastern Afghanistan as a Security Force Advise and Assist Team at Camp Clark in Khost Province. HHB and the SFAAT, augmented by C/3-71 CAV, supported the 2/203 Corps while Bravo Battery conducted a traditional firing battery mission, supporting the Polish Army in Ghazni Province, 2nd Battalion, 87th Infantry in Logar Province, HHB and the SFAAT in Khost Province, and 1st Platoon, Alpha Battery supported the BCT HQ and 710 BSB in Paktiya Province. Bravo Battery was the last unit in Afghanistan to fire the M119A2 howitzer in support of combat operations and occupy all hybrid firing points consisting of both the M119A2 howitzer and the M777A2 howitzer.

== 5th Battalion history ==
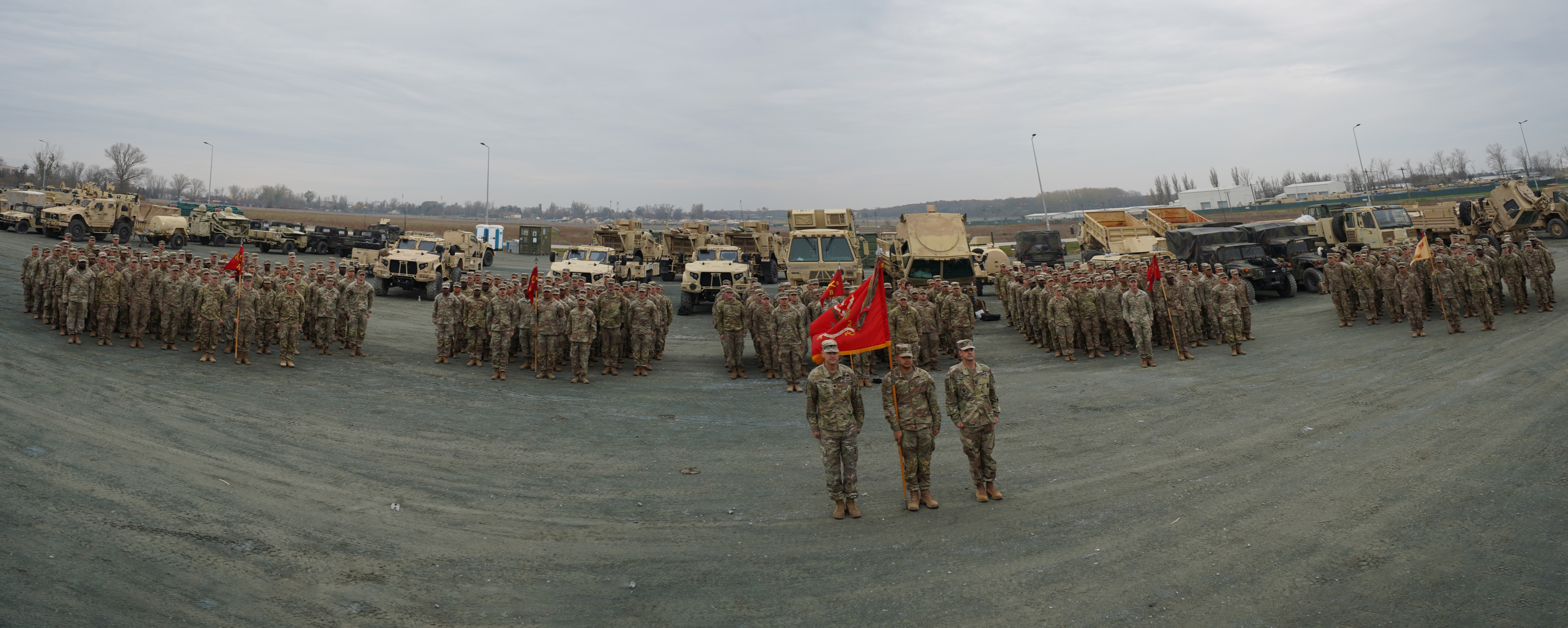
5th Battalion deployed at Mihail Kogălniceanu Air Base, Romania

- Constituted 5 July 1918 in the National Army as Battery E, 25th Field Artillery, an element of the 9th Division.
- Organized 2 August 1918 at Camp McClellan, Alabama.
- Demobilized 8 February 1919 at Camp McClellan, Alabama.
- Reconstituted 22 December 1920 in the Regular Army as Battery E, 25th Field Artillery (Philippine Scouts).
- Organized 26 September 1921 at Fort William McKinley, Philippine Islands, as an element of the Philippine Division.
- Inactivated 30 September 1922 at Fort Stotsenburg, Philippine Islands.
- (25th Field Artillery relieved 1 January 1930 from assignment to the Philippine Division and assigned to the 9th Division; Philippine Scouts concurrently removed as a parenthetical designation).
- Activated 1 December 1934 at Madison Barracks, New York.
- (25th Field Artillery relieved 16 October 1939 from assignment to the 9th Division).
- Reorganized and redesignated 30 December 1940 as Battery B, 25th Field Artillery Battalion.
- Inactivated 21 March 1946 at Camp Kilmer, New Jersey.
- (25th Field Artillery Battalion redesignated 1 August 1946 as the 25th Parachute Field Artillery Battery and activated at Fort Benning, Georgia; inactivated 14 November 1946 at Fort Benning, Georgia).
- Former Battery B, 25th Field Artillery Battalion, redesignated 29 November 1949 as Battery B, 25th Parachute Field Artillery Battalion; concurrently, consolidated with Battery B, 25th Field Artillery Battalion (active), and consolidated unit designated as Battery B, 25th Field Artillery Battalion, an element of the 10th Infantry Division.
- Inactivated 1 July 1957 in Germany and relieved from assignment to the 10th Infantry Division.
- Redesignated 31 July 1959 as Headquarters and Headquarters Battery, 5th Battalion, 25th Artillery.
- Redesignated 1 September 1971 as Headquarters and Headquarters Battery, 5th Battalion, 25th Field Artillery.
- Redesignated 20 March 1978 as Battery E, 25th Field Artillery, assigned to the 2d Infantry Division, and activated in Korea.
- Inactivated 16 June 1988 in Korea and relieved from assignment to the 2d Infantry Division.
- Redesignated 16 January 2005 as Headquarters and Headquarters Battery, 5th Battalion, 25th Field Artillery, assigned to the 4th Brigade Combat Team, 10th Mountain Division, and activated at Fort Polk, Louisiana (organic elements concurrently constituted and activated).
- Battalion redesignated 1 October 2005 as the 5th Battalion, 25th Field Artillery Regiment.

== Lineage ==
Constituted 5 July 1918 in the National Army as the 25th Field Artillery and assigned to the 9th Infantry Division (United States)

Organized 2 August 1918 at Camp McClellan, Alabama

Demobilized 8 February 1919 at Camp McClellan.

Reconstituted 22 December 1920 in the regular army as the 25th field Artillery (Philippine Scouts).

Organized 26 September 1921 at Fort William McKinley, Philippine Islands, as an element of the Philippine Division.

Inactivated 30 September 1922 at Fort Stotsenburg, Philippine Islands.

Redesignated as the 25th field Artillery, 1 January 1930; concurrently relieved from the Philippine Division and assigned to the 9th Division. (2nd Battalion activated 1 December 1934 at Madison Barracks, New York) Relieved from the 9th division in 1939

Redesignated 30 December 1940 as the 25th Field artillery Battalion; concurrently organized at Henry Barracks, Puerto Rico with personnel and equipment from the 2nd Battalion 25th field Artillery.

Inactivated 21 March 1946 at Camp Kilmer, New Jersey Redesignated 1 August 1946 as the 25th Parachute Field artillery Battery. and activated at Fort Benning, Georgia; inactivated 14 November 1946 at Fort Benning, Georgia

== Distinctive unit insignia ==
Description

A Gold color metal and enamel device 15/16 inch (2.4 cm) in height consisting of a shield blazoned: Gules, a sea-lion in dexter paw a sword, all Or. Attached below the shield a Gold scroll inscribed “TACE ET FACE” in Black letters.

Symbolism

The shield is red for Artillery. The sea-lion is taken from the coat of arms of the Philippine Islands, where the organization was assigned during its period of active service.

Background

The distinctive unit insignia was originally approved for the 25th Field Artillery Regiment on 29 March 1935. It was redesignated for the 25th Field Artillery Battalion on 29 March 1942. It was redesignated for the 25th Artillery Regiment on 14 August 1958. The insignia was redesignated effective 1 September 1971, for the 25th Field Artillery Regiment. It was amended to update the description on 24 September 2004.

== Coat of arms ==
- Blazon
  - Shield- Gules, a sea-lion Or langued and armed Azure, in dexter paw a sword Argent.
  - Crest- From a wreath of the colors Or and Gules two arms vambraced, counter-embowed and fretted Proper the dexter forearm charged with a Taeguk Gules and Azure, hand grasping a sword Proper, the sinister arm charged with a pellet bearing a fleur-de-lis Argent, the hand grasping five lightning bolts radiated to dexter chief of the first.
  - Motto- TACE ET FACE (Be Silent and Act).
- Symbolism
  - Shield- The shield is red for Artillery. The sea-lion is taken from the coat of arms of the Philippine Islands, where the organization was assigned during its period of active service.
  - Crest- The arm holding the five lightning flashes and charged with a fleur-de-lis alludes to the five battle honors received in France and Germany in World War II. The arm holding the sword and charged with a Taeguk refers to service in Korea.
- Background- The coat of arms was originally approved for the 25th Field Artillery Regiment on 29 March 1935. It was redesignated for the 25th Field Artillery Battalion on 16 March 1942. It was redesignated for the 25th Artillery Regiment on 14 August 1958. It was amended to add a crest on 14 July 1965. The insignia was redesignated effective 1 September 1971, for the 25th Field Artillery Regiment. The coat of arms was amended to correct the blazon of the crest on 24 September 2004.

== Active units ==
- 5th Battalion 25th Field Artillery Regiment
- Alpha ("Ares") Battery
- Bravo ("Bulldog") Battery
- Charlie ("Carnage") Battery
- Headquarters and Headquarters Battery (HHB) ("Hydra")
- Fox ("Fury") Company, 710th Brigade Support Battalion (F-710th BSB) (Forward Support Company)

== Inactive units ==
Throughout the history of the regiment, separate batteries were established to augment division artillery and artillery brigades. During the Cold War period numerous target acquisition batteries (TAB) were established and assigned as divisional assets in division artillery as separate units. These TABs operated various target acquisition systems, including the AN/TPQ-36 and AN/TPQ-37 Firefinder RADAR systems, and fielded organic fire support elements and artillery survey sections. The majority of these separate batteries were dissolved or absorbed by other elements in the late 1990s.

== See also ==
- Field Artillery Branch (United States)
- 10th Mountain Division (United States)
