= 1st Brigade Combat Team, 10th Mountain Division =

Infantry Brigade Combat Team of the United States Army

- Insignia of the 10th Mountain Division
- Active: 1985 – present
- Country: United States of America
- Branch: United States Army
- Type: Infantry brigade combat team
- Role: Infantry and combined arms warfare maneuvering
- Size: Brigade
- Part of: 10th Mountain Division
- Garrison/HQ: Fort Drum, New York, U.S.
- Nickname: Warrior
- Motto: "Find a way or make one"
- Engagements: Second World War; Aleutian Islands Campaign; Italian Campaign; Somalian Expedition; War on terror; War in Afghanistan; Iraq War; Operation Inherent Resolve; Operation Freedom's Sentinel

Commanders
- Commander: Col. Douglas M. Graham
- Command Sergeant Major: CSM Michael McQuality

The 1st Brigade Combat Team, 10th Mountain Division is an active Infantry Brigade Combat Team of the United States Army based at Fort Drum in New York. The brigade headquarters carries the lineage of the 10th Mountain Division's original headquarters company, and served as such in World War II, and in peacetime at Fort Riley, Fort Benning, and West Germany in the 1940s and 1950s.

The brigade was activated in April 1986, at Fort Drum, New York, when the 10th Mountain Division was reactivated as one of the Army's new Light Infantry Divisions. 1st Brigade and its subordinates saw numerous deployments to contingencies around the world in the 1990s. With the global war on terrorism the brigade has seen multiple deployments to Afghanistan to support Operation Enduring Freedom and to Iraq to support Operation Iraqi Freedom.

== Organization ==
The brigade currently consists of seven subordinate battalions. The core of the brigade's combat power are its three infantry battalions: 2nd Battalion, 22nd Infantry Regiment; the 1st Battalion, 32nd Infantry Regiment; and the 1st Battalion, 87th Infantry Regiment. The 3rd Squadron, 71st Cavalry Regiment provides reconnaissance to the Brigade Combat Team, while the 3rd Battalion, 6th Field Artillery Regiment provides field artillery support. The 7th Brigade Engineer Battalion provides combat engineering, military intelligence, and signal services, and the 10th Brigade Support Battalion provides the brigade's logistics support.

1st Infantry Brigade Combat Team (IBCT) "Warrior", 10th Mountain Division

- Headquarters and Headquarters Company (HHC)
- 1st Battalion, 32nd Infantry Regiment
- 1st Battalion, 87th Infantry Regiment
- 2nd Battalion, 22nd Infantry Regiment (Triple Deuce)
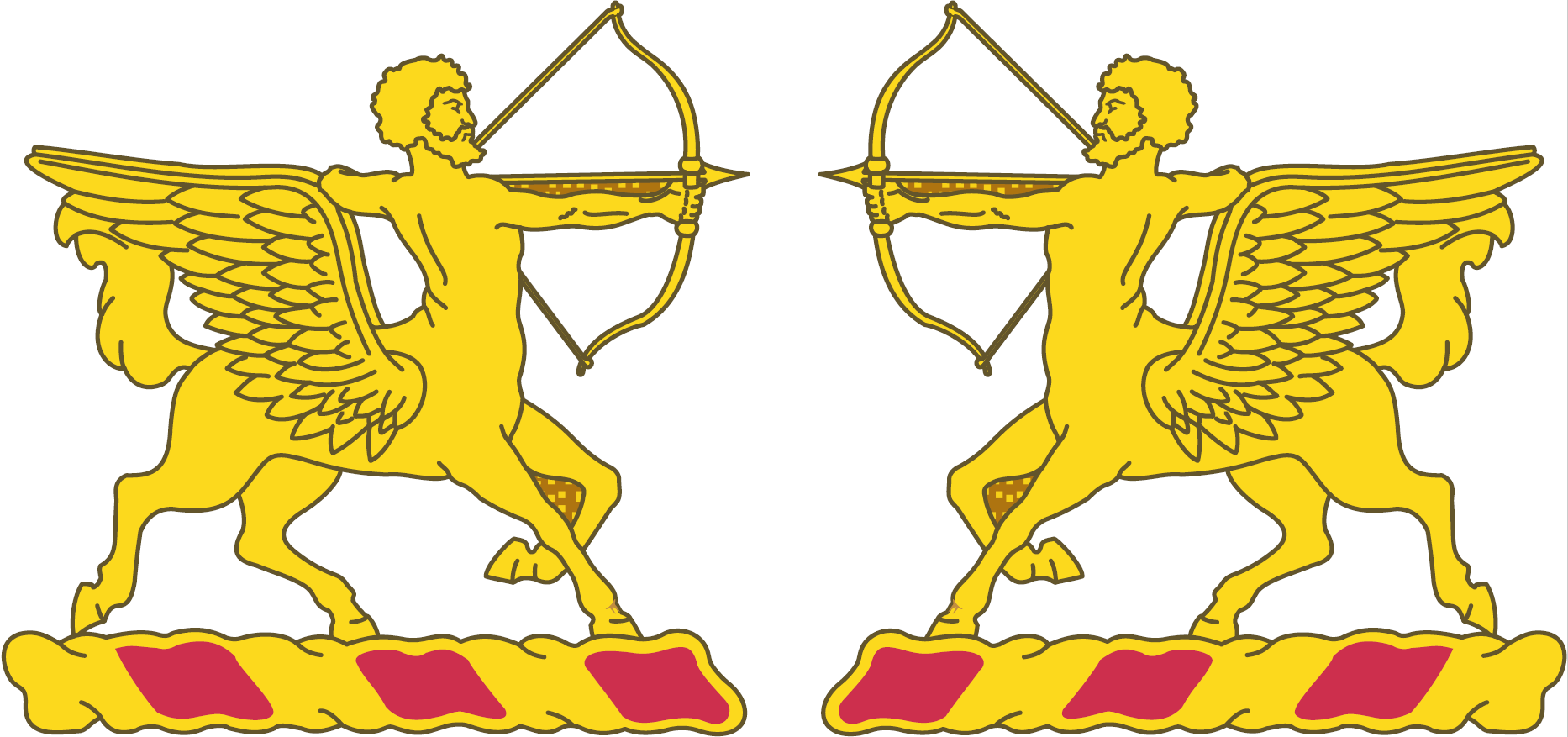
- 3rd Battalion, 6th Field Artillery Regiment (FAR)
- 3rd Squadron, 71st Cavalry Regiment
- 7th Brigade Engineer Battalion (BEB)
- 10th Brigade Support Battalion (BSB)

== History ==
=== 1980s ===
On 13 February 1985, the 10th Mountain Division (Light Infantry) was reactivated at Fort Drum, New York. In accordance with the Reorganization Objective Army Divisions plan, the division was no longer centered around regiments, instead two brigades were activated under the division. The 1st Brigade, 10th Mountain Division was activated at Fort Drum while the 2nd Brigade, 10th Mountain Division was activated at Fort Benning, moving to Fort Drum in 1988.

=== 1990s ===
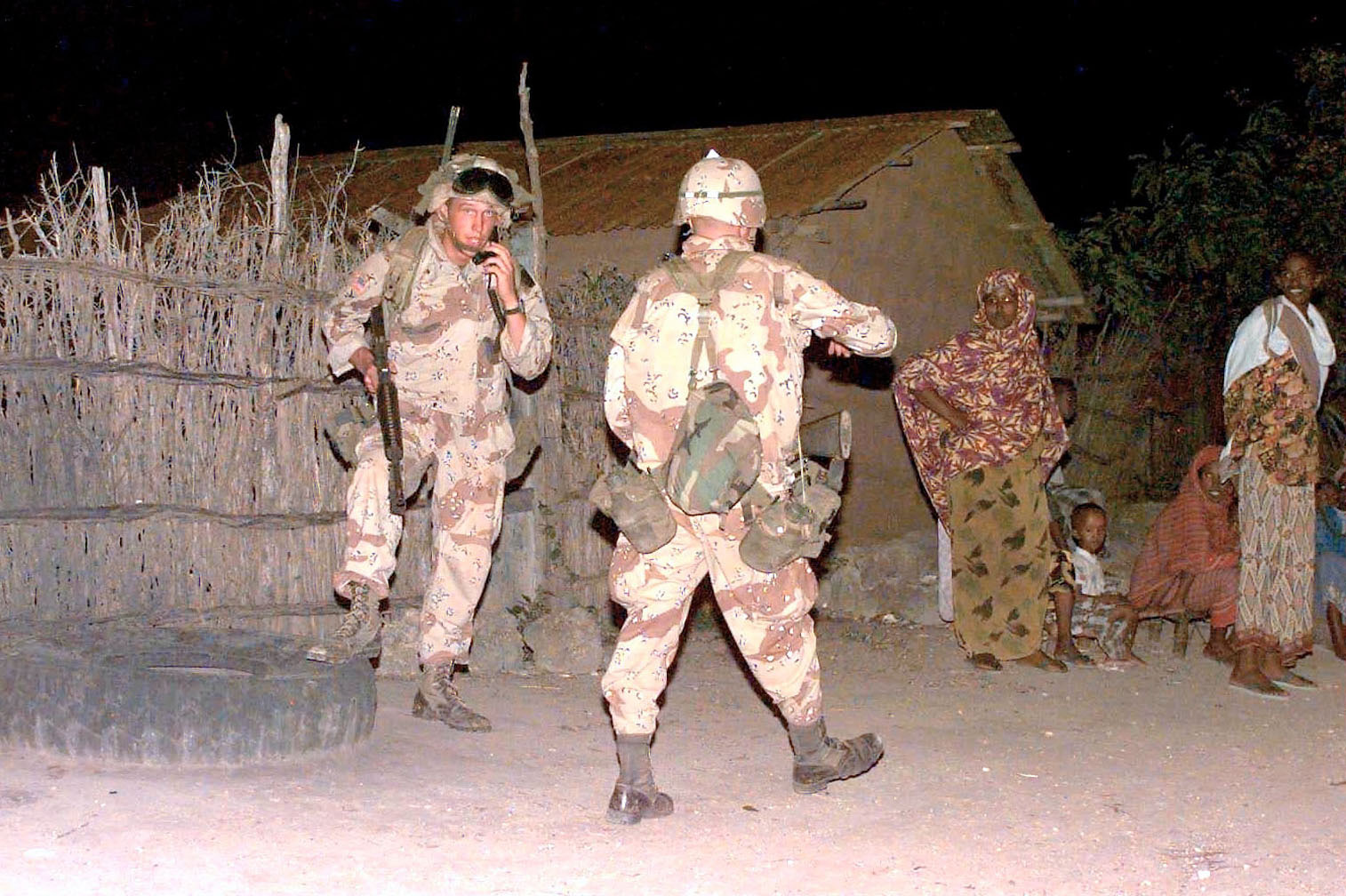
U.S. soldiers of the 10th Mountain Division sweep a Somali village for weapons in 1993.

Hurricane Andrew struck South Florida on 24 August 1992, killing 13 people, leaving another 250,000 homeless and causing damages in excess of 20 billion dollars. On 27 September 1992, the 10th Mountain Division assumed responsibility for Hurricane Andrew disaster relief as Task Force Mountain. Division soldiers set up relief camps, distributed food, clothing, medical necessities and building supplies, as well as helping to rebuild homes and clear debris. The last of the 6,000 division soldiers to deployed to Florida returned home in October 1992.

==== Operation Restore Hope ====
On 3 December 1993, the division headquarters was designated as the headquarters for all Army Forces (ARFOR) of the Unified Task Force (UNITAF) for Operation Restore Hope. Major General Steven L. Arnold, the division Commander, was named Army Forces commander. The 10th Mountain Division's mission was to secure major cities and roads to provide safe passage of relief supplies to the Somali population suffering from the effects of the Somali Civil War. Due to 10th Mountain Division efforts, humanitarian agencies declared an end to the food emergency and factional fighting decreased. When Task Force Ranger and the SAR team were pinned down during a raid in what later became known as the Battle of Mogadishu, 10th Mountain units provided infantry for the UN quick reaction force sent to rescue them. The 10th had 2 soldiers killed in the fighting, which was the longest sustained firefight by regular US Army forces since the Vietnam War. The division began a gradual reduction of forces in Somalia in February 1993, until the last soldiers of the 2nd Battalion, 22nd Infantry returned to the United States in March 1994.

==== Operation Uphold Democracy ====
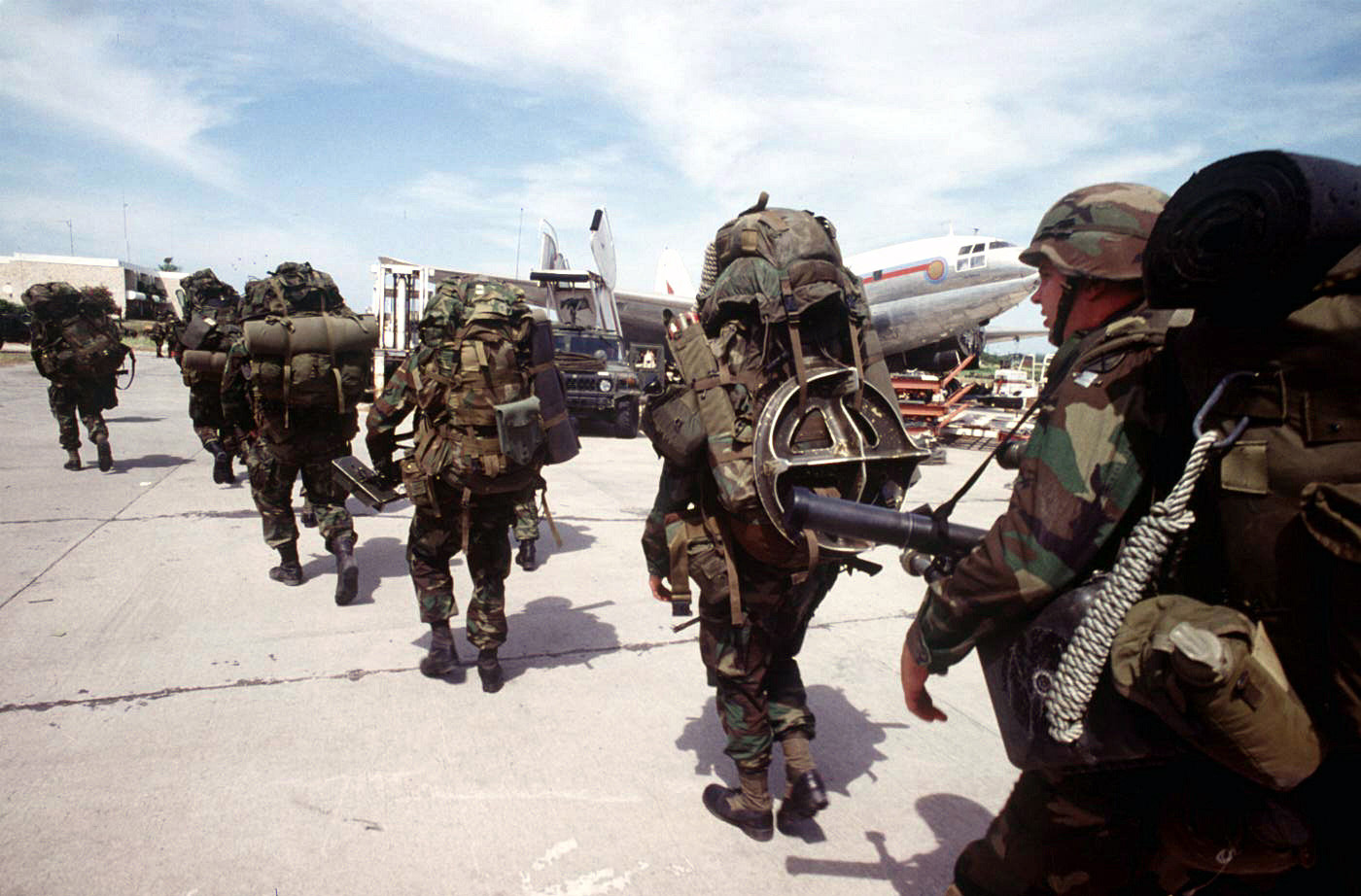
U.S. soldiers of the 10th Mountain Division secure Port-au-Prince International Airport in 1994.

The division formed the nucleus of the Multinational Force Haiti (MNF Haiti) and Joint Task Force 190 (JTF 190) in Haiti during Operation Uphold Democracy. More than 8,600 of the division's troops deployed during this operation. On 19 September 1994, the 1st Brigade conducted the Army's first air assault from an aircraft carrier. This force consisted of 54 helicopters and almost 2,000 soldiers. They occupied the Port-au-Prince International Airport. This was the largest Army air operation conducted from a carrier since the Doolittle Raid in World War II.

The division's mission was to create a secure and stable environment so the government of Haitian President Jean-Bertrand Aristide could be reestablished and democratic elections held. After this was accomplished, the 10th Mountain Division handed over control of the MNF-Haiti to the 25th Infantry Division on 15 January 1995. The Division redeployed the last of its soldiers who served in Haiti by 31 January 1995.

=== 2000s ===
==== Global war on terrorism ====
In late 2001, following the 11 September 2001 attacks, elements of the brigade's 1-87th Infantry, deployed to Afghanistan in support of Operation Enduring Freedom. These forces remained in the country until mid-2002, fighting to secure remote areas of the country and participating in prominent operations such as Operation Anaconda, the Fall of Mazar-i-Sharif, and the Battle of Qala-i-Jangi. The division also participated in fighting in the Shahi Khot Valley in 2002. Upon the return of the battalions, they were welcomed home and praised by President George W. Bush.

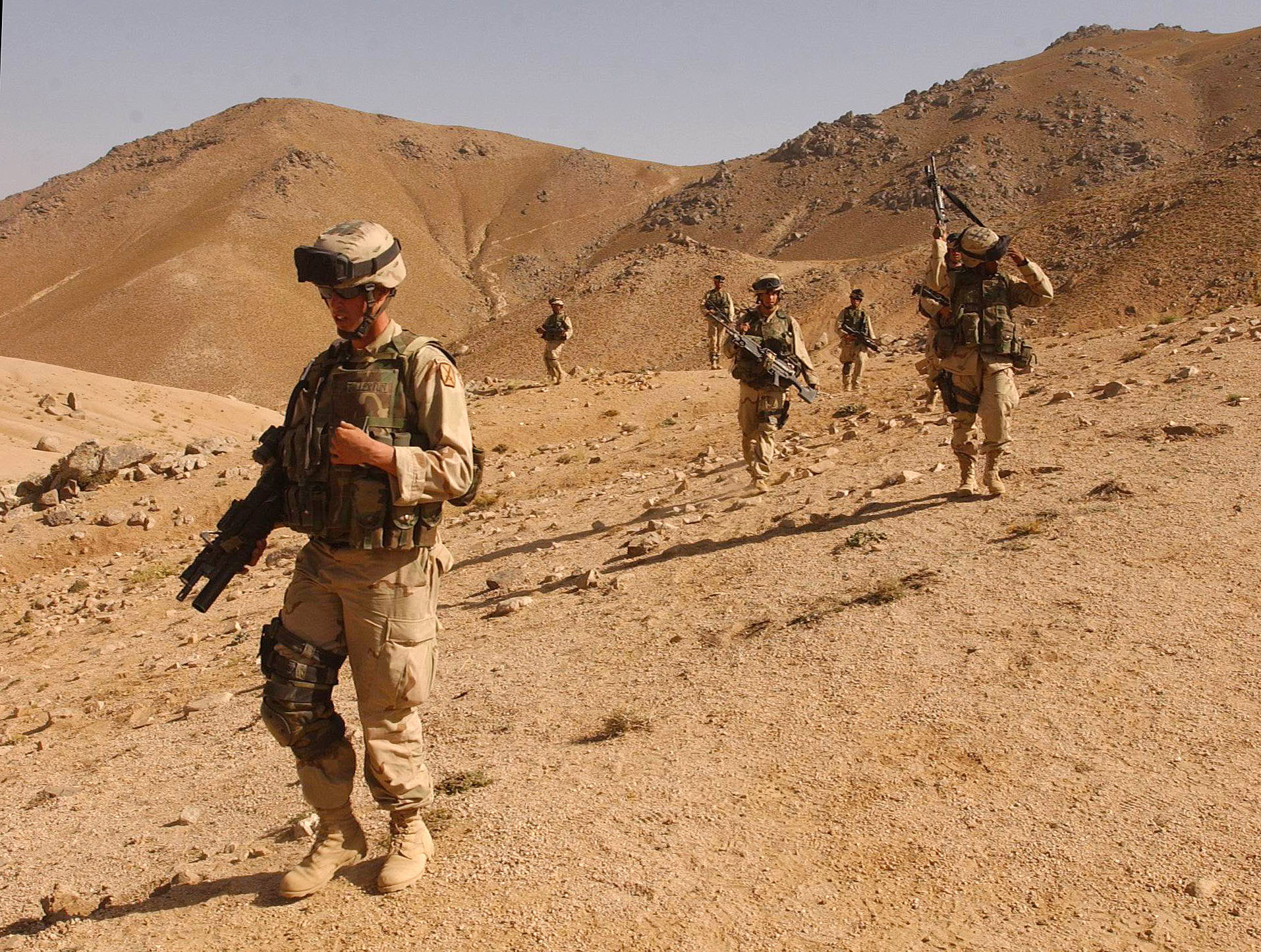
10th Mountain Division soldiers in Afghanistan, 2003.

In summer 2003, the TF Warrior returned to Afghanistan, relieving TF Devil from the 82nd Airborne Division for Operation Enduring Freedom IV. For more than 6 months, they operated in the frontier regions of the country such as Paktika Province, going places previously untouched by the war in search of Taliban and Al-Qaeda forces. Fighting in several small-scale conflicts such as Operation Avalanche, Operation Mountain Resolve, and Operation Mountain Viper, the division maintained a strategy of small units moving through remote regions of the country to interact directly with the population and drive out insurgents. The 1st Brigade also undertook a number of humanitarian missions.

Upon redeployment in 2004, the brigade began the process of transformation into a modular brigade combat team. On 16 September 2004, the brigade officially became the 1st Brigade Combat Team, sending the 1st Battalion, 32nd Infantry Regiment to the newly formed 3rd BCT, and receiving the permanent assignment of the 3rd Battalion, 6th Field Artillery and 10th Support Battalion. The brigade also activated a new special troops battalion to consolidate the formerly separate engineer, signal and military intelligence elements, and the 1st Squadron, 71st Cavalry to provide reconnaissance for the brigade.

The brigade returned to Afghanistan from 2010 to 2011. While one infantry battalion, the 2nd Battalion, 22nd Infantry Regiment, deployed in January 2010, the brigade officially assumed responsibilities for its mission in May 2010. The 2nd Battalion, 22nd Infantry advised the Kabul Military Training Center, the rest of the brigade conducted training and joint operations with Afghan Police and the Afghan National Army 209th Corps in northern Afghanistan, the provinces of Faryab, Balkh, Kunduz and Baghlan.

The brigade returned again to Afghanistan from February through November 2013, advising the 203rd Afghan Corps in Ghazni and Paktya Provinces as "Cross Functional Team Warrior". Under the command of COL Stephen Michael, the brigade advised and assisted the 2nd and 3rd brigades of the 203rd Corps, other Afghan National Army units, and various types of Afghan police, and also supervised the retrograde and redeployment of equipment.

In October 2014, the brigade reorganized under the BCT 2020 structure. The major changes were the addition of a third infantry battalion, the conversion of the brigade special troops battalion into a brigade engineer battalion, and the reflagging of the brigade's cavalry squadron.

In August 2015, 1,250 soldiers from the brigade were deployed to Iraq to support Operation Inherent Resolve.

On 5 December 2019, the Department of the Army announced that the 1st Brigade Combat Team would replace the 3rd Brigade Combat Team, 82nd Airborne Division as part of a unit rotation in support of Operation Freedom's Sentinel. The brigade deployed to Afghanistan in early 2020.

== Lineage and honors ==
The division has received several awards over the course of its history, including the following:

Campaign participation credit

- World War II: North Apennines; Po Valley
- Armed Forces Expeditions: Somalia
- Afghanistan: Consolidation I; Consolidation III
- Iraq: Iraqi Governance; National Resolution; Iraqi Surge

Decorations

- U.S. Army Meritorious Unit Commendation, streamer embroidered: "AFGHANISTAN 2003-2004"
- U.S. Army Meritorious Unit Commendation, streamer embroidered: "IRAQ 2005-2006"
- U.S. Army Meritorious Unit Commendation, streamer embroidered: "IRAQ 2007-2008"
- U.S. Army Meritorious Unit Commendation, streamer embroidered: "AFGHANISTAN 2010-2011"
- U.S. Army Meritorious Unit Commendation, streamer embroidered: "IRAQ 2015-2016"
- U.S. Army Joint Meritorious Unit Award, Streamer embroidered: "SOMALIA 1992-1995" 10th FSB
- U.S. Army Meritorious Unit Commendation, streamer embroidered: "IRAQ 2022-2023"

== Sources ==
NATO Symbol

1

10 Mtn

- McGrath, John J. (2004). The Brigade: A History: Its Organization and Employment in the US Army. Combat Studies Institute Press. ISBN 978-1-4404-4915-4.
- Army Almanac: A Book of Facts Concerning the Army of the United States. United States Government Printing Office. 1959. ASIN B0006D8NKK.
