= 3rd Brigade Combat Team, 10th Mountain Division =

3rd Infantry Brigade Combat Team ("Patriot"), 10th Mountain Division
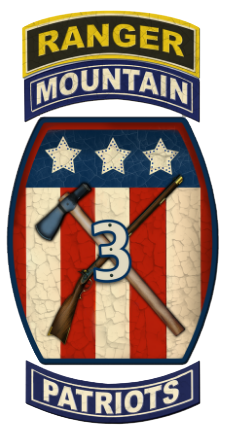
- Badge of the 3rd Brigade Combat Team, 10th Mountain Division
- Active: September 2004 – present
- Country: United States
- Branch: United States Army
- Type: Infantry
- Size: Brigade
- Part of: 10th Mountain Division
- Garrison/HQ: Fort Polk, Louisiana
- Nicknames: Patriot Brigade; Spartan Brigade; Tribe of the Crossed Swords
- Motto: "Forged for War"
- Mascot: Patriot
- Engagements: War on terror; Operation Enduring Freedom; Operation Iraqi Freedom

Commanders
- Commanding Officer: COL Ian M. Ginty
- Command Sergeant Major: CSM Robert W. Frame

Insignia
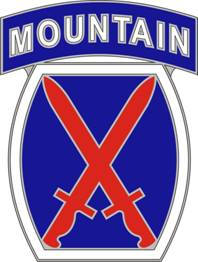
- Combat service identification badge

- Shoulder sleeve insignia (2016–2019)

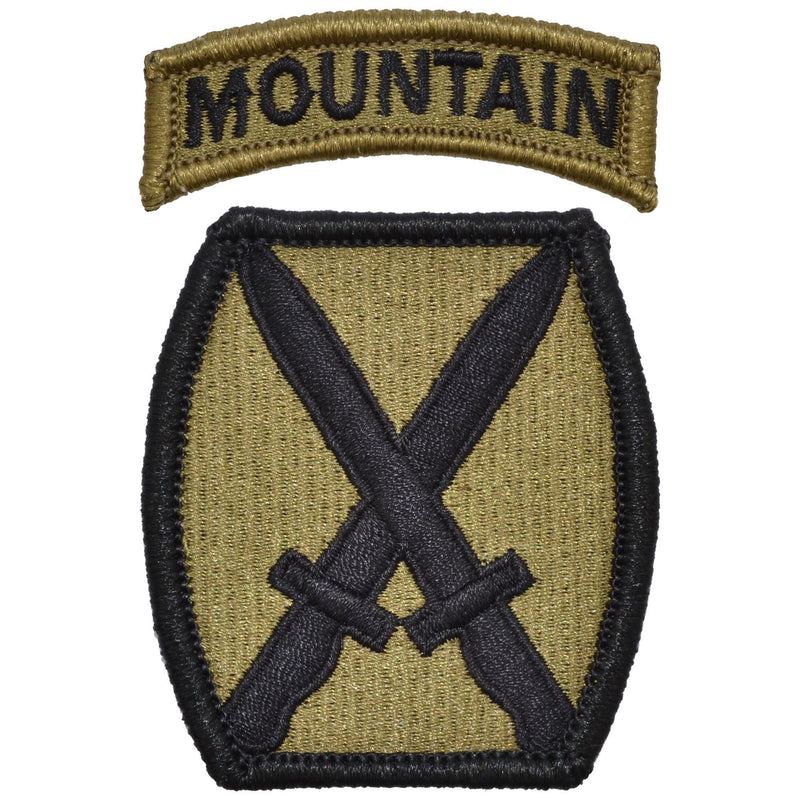
- Subdued Shoulder Sleeve Insignia worn on OCP-ACU

The 3rd Brigade Combat Team, 10th Mountain Division is an infantry brigade combat team of the United States Army based at Fort Polk, Louisiana. After its activation in 2004, the brigade was deployed four times to Afghanistan in support of Operation Enduring Freedom. In 2014, the brigade deactivated at Fort Drum, NY, and its infantry battalions were reassigned to other brigades while its special troops battalion, field artillery battalion, brigade support battalion and cavalry squadron were inactivated. The brigade reactivated at Fort Polk, LA in 2015 by re-flagging the assets of the 4th Brigade Combat Team, 10th Mountain Division, which was inactivated. The infantry, cavalry and field artillery battalions of the 4th Brigade were reassigned to the 3rd Brigade. The brigade deployed to Iraq in 2017 in support of Operation Inherent Resolve. The brigade deployed to the Southwest Border in 2019 in support of Operation Faithful Patriot.

From 2016 to 2019, while still part of the 10th Mountain Division, the brigade wore the patch of the 36th Infantry Division through the Army's Associated Unit Pilot program.

More recently, Brigade assets participated in Defender Europe 24 conducting exercises across Norway and NATO’s two newest members, Sweden and Finland. The Patriot Brigade fully rotated into the U.S. Army V Corps’ mission, Operation Atlantic Resolve, to reinforce NATO’s eastern flank along with conducting exercises with NATO allies across Europe.

== 3rd BCT "Spartans", 10th MTN DIV (LI) ==
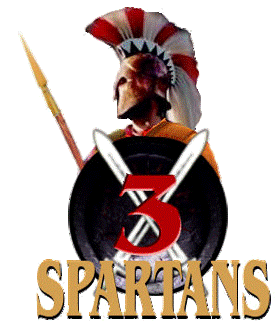
3rd BCT "Spartan" logo used from 2004 to 2014 at Fort Drum

The 3rd Brigade Combat Team, 10th Mountain Division (LI) was established in September 2004. The six subordinate battalions were first brought together in September 2004 with a specific mission, making them unique among other Army entities: to support Operation Enduring Freedom, which they would go on to do with four deployments to Afghanistan.

The 1st Battalion, 32nd Infantry Regiment; 2nd Battalion, 87th Infantry Regiment; 4th Battalion, 25th Artillery Regiment; 3rd Squadron, 71st Cavalry Regiment; 710th Brigade Support Battalion; and 3rd Brigade Special Troops Battalion were brought together to form the Spartans of the 3rd Brigade Combat Team, 10th Mountain Division (LI). They served in both the Regional Command East and the Regional Command South areas of responsibility, a vast area of Afghanistan encompassing approximately 124,000 square miles of a rugged and frequently hostile land.

They first deployed to Afghanistan in February 2006 (Operation Enduring Freedom rotations VII), where they fought the Taliban in the mountainous terrain of the Afghan-Pakistani border. It was during this deployment that SFC Jared C. Monti, of 3rd Squadron, 71st Cavalry Regiment, earned the Medal of Honor while protecting his soldiers from an overwhelming Taliban attack on his unit's position. When the Spartan Brigade redeployed to Fort Drum after 16 months, the Afghan people nicknamed them "the Tribe of the Crossed Swords".

In January 2009, the Spartan Brigade deployed again to Afghanistan, returning to RC-East, where they were tasked with providing security for the Logar and Wardak provinces as well as the southern entrance to the country's capital. This deployment also resulted in another Spartan Brigade Soldier, Capt. William D. Swenson, being awarded the Medal of Honor for his actions during an intense, six-hour-long battle with insurgents, effectively disrupting their assault.

Not long after, the Spartan Brigade found itself once again being called upon to deploy to Afghanistan. Departing in March 2011, 3rd BCT Soldiers were sent to Kandahar Province. Located in the RC-South area of responsibility, Kandahar is also the birthplace of the Taliban. The Spartan Soldiers set about conducting both lethal and nonlethal missions to break the insurgent's grip on the province. The missions were conducted under three main operations – "To the River", "To the Core" and "To the Summit", which maintained continuous pressure on the enemy, eventually driving them out of their place of inception. In doing so, the Spartan Brigade advanced farther south than any of the previous coalition forces before their arrival. The brigade was also responsible for opening 22 schools and three medical clinics, as well as securing and refurbishing more than 50 kilometers of Highway 1, the national highway for southern Afghanistan.

Through it all, the 3rd BCT built upon and reinforced their "shohna ba shohna" partnership with the Afghan security forces and government leaders. Shohna ba shohna means "shoulder to shoulder" in the Pashto language. The strengthened ties between the Spartan Brigade and their Afghan partners resulted in a marked increase in the security and governance of an area that had been at war for 30 years.

The Spartan Brigade embarked on its final deployment to Afghanistan in October 2013, not long after the announcement of their inactivation. The 3rd BCT deployed once again to Regional Command East, but this time, as a newly configured security force advise and assist brigade. An SFAAB differs from a standard brigade combat team in many ways. However, the most notable differences are a considerably smaller number of personnel and the almost total emphasis placed on the utilization of several, highly specialized Security force advise and assist teams, or SFAATs. Although they deployed as a smaller contingent, they assumed responsibility for most of the provinces in the region – among them Wardak, Logar, Ghazni, Khost, Paktia, and Paktika – thus relieving a division-size element.

The brigade partnered with the Afghan National Army's 203rd Corps, sharing their expertise, helping them to grow their capabilities as they continued to assume responsibility for the security of their nation and its people. The Afghans were able to successfully hold a grand council of leaders, also known as a Loya Jirga in Pashto, as well as the Ghazni Islamic festival, which was attended by dignitaries and followers from around the world. The Spartan Brigade also guided the Afghan security forces as they conducted their national presidential election, along with the ensuing run-off election.

== Order of battle ==
When established in 2004, the brigade consisted of:

- Headquarters and Headquarters Company
- 3rd Squadron, 71st Cavalry Regiment
- 1st Battalion, 32nd Infantry Regiment
- 2nd Battalion, 87th Infantry Regiment
- 4th Battalion, 25th Field Artillery Regiment
- 3rd Brigade's Special Troops Battalion
- 710th Brigade Support Battalion

In February 2014, the brigade inactivated most of its elements at Fort Drum, and reflagged using the assets of the 4th Brigade Combat Team, 10th Mountain Division at Fort Polk, Louisiana. Most of the assigned battalions of the 4th Brigade were reassigned to the 3rd Brigade. The 3rd Brigade currently consists of:

- Headquarters and Headquarters Company
- 2nd Battalion, 2nd Infantry Regiment
- 2nd Battalion, 4th Infantry Regiment
- 2nd Battalion, 30th Infantry Regiment
- 5th Battalion, 25th Field Artillery Regiment
- 710th Brigade Support Battalion

As part of the US Army's reorganization to provide each brigade combat team with a third maneuver battalion, the 2nd Battalion, 2nd Infantry Regiment joined the brigade.

In June 2024 3rd Squadron, 89th Cavalry Regiment was inactivated at then Fort Johnson (now Fort Polk), LA as part of a wider Brigade reorganization.

In September 2025, 317th Brigade Engineer Battalion was inactivated at Fort Polk.

== Lineage and honors ==
=== Lineage ===
- Constituted 16 September 2004 in the Regular Army as Headquarters, 3d Brigade Combat Team, 10th Mountain Division, and activated at Fort Drum, New York

=== Campaign participation credit ===
- War on Terrorism: Afghanistan: Consolidation I; Additional Campaigns to be determined

=== Decorations ===
- Meritorious Unit Commendation (Army), Streamer Embroidered AFGHANISTAN 2006-2007
- Meritorious Unit Commendation (Army), Streamer Embroidered AFGHANISTAN 2009
- Meritorious Unit Commendation (Army) for the period 31 October 2013 to 19 July 2014
- Meritorious Unit Commendation (Army), Streamer Embroidered AFGHANISTAN 2015-2016

== In popular culture ==
The 3rd Brigade of the 10th Mountain Division, known as the Spartans, is referenced in the sci-fi action movie War Machine (2026 film).
