= 4th Brigade Combat Team, 10th Mountain Division =

4th "Patriot" Brigade Combat Team, 10th Mountain Division (Light Infantry)
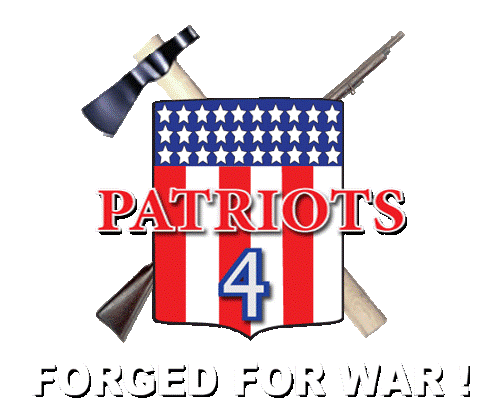
- 4th "Patriot" Brigade Combat Team
- Active: 2005 – 2015
- Disbanded: 2015
- Country: United States of America
- Branch: United States Army
- Type: Infantry
- Size: Brigade
- Part of: 10th Mountain Division
- Garrison/HQ: Fort Polk, Louisiana
- Nickname(s): "Patriot Brigade" (Special Designation)
- Motto(s): "Forged for War"
- Mascot(s): Patriot
- Engagements: Operation Enduring Freedom; Operation Iraqi Freedom; Iraq War

The 4th Brigade Combat Team, 10th Mountain Division ("Patriot Brigade") is an inactive infantry brigade combat team of the United States Army. Based at Fort Polk, Louisiana, the brigade was active from 2005 to 2015. It was part of the 10th Mountain Division.

== History ==
The brigade officially activated at Fort Polk, Louisiana, 19 January 2005. At its inception, the brigade included just a few hundred Soldiers. The first planned task for the brigade was to deploy to fight in the War in Afghanistan (2001-2021). Brigade leaders immediately set to work to expand and prepare the formation for deployment.

In the midst of preparing for deployment, elements across the brigade provided disaster response and relief within Louisiana to help mitigate the devastating effects of hurricanes Katrina and Rita during the fall of 2005. The brigade deployed more than 300 Soldiers to New Orleans after Katrina and supported local relief-and-recovery efforts to Fort Polk communities following Rita.

Since January 2006, the brigade has deployed more than six thousand Soldiers. Throughout 2006 and 2007, several formations within the brigade deployed and operated in Afghanistan. The brigade command and headquarters established the first U.S. National Command Element in Kandahar to facilitate the transfer of authority of combat operations to NATO-led coalition allies.

In May 2007, the BCT received orders to prepare for a deployment to Iraq and deployed in November 2007 on a 14-month deployment. The Brigade operated from two forward operating bases and twenty-two joint security stations and combat outposts. Task Force Patriot assumed responsibility for eastern Baghdad – a heavily urbanized area encompassing 80 square miles and more than 2 million citizens.

The 4th Brigade Combat Team deployed to eastern Afghanistan's Logar and Wardak in October 2010. Their mission was to conduct population-centric, combined-action counterinsurgency operations, building Afghan National Security Force capability and enhancing the effectiveness of provincial governments to create a more stable environment for transition and to defeat insurgency.

Task Force Patriot deployed once again to Afghanistan in July 2013 when it assumed responsibility for the Train, Advise and Assist mission for the seven provinces of Regional Command – East, North of Kabul from the 1st BCT, 101st ABN DIV and the 4th BCT, 1st Cavalry Division. Task Force Patriot assisted the Afghan National Army during the fighting season. After the fighting season, Task Force Patriot focused on building sustainable systems in the ANSF that would allow them to be a professional force that is capable of supplying, training, and maintaining itself with Afghan processes and solutions.

== Order of battle ==
While active, the brigade consisted of:

- Headquarters and Headquarters Company (HHC), 4th Brigade Combat Team (4th BCT)
- 3rd Squadron, 89th Cavalry Regiment - HHT, A and B Troops, C Company, and D Company (Forward Support), 94th BSB attached.
- 2nd Battalion, 4th Infantry Regiment

    *HHC
    *A Company
    *B Company
    *C Company
    *D Company
      Attached
    *E Company (Forward Support), 94th BSB

- 2nd Battalion, 30th Infantry Regiment

    *HHC
    *A Company
    *B Company
    *C Company
    *D Company
     Attached
    *F Company (Forward Support), 94th BSB

- 5th Battalion, 25th Field Artillery Regiment (5-25th FAR)

    *HHB Battery "Regulators"
    *A Battery "Gators"
    *B Battery "Bulldogs"
     Attached
    *G Company (Forward Support), 94th BSB

- Special Troops Battalion (STB), 4th Brigade Combat Team (4th BCT)

    *HHC
    *Signal Company
    *Engineer Company
    *Military Intelligence Company
    *Military Police Platoon
    *Fire Support Coordination Cell 

- 94th Brigade Support Battalion (94th BSB)

    *HHC
    *A Company (Supply)
    *B Company (Maintenance)
    *C Company (Medical)
    *D Company (Fwd Spt)
    *E Company (Fwd Spt)
    *F Company (Fwd Spt)
    *G Company (Fwd Spt)

== Lineage and honors ==
=== Lineage ===
- Constituted 16 January 2005 in the Regular Army as Headquarters, 4th Brigade Combat Team, 10th Mountain Division, and activated at Fort Polk, Louisiana
- Inactivated 24 February 2015 at Fort Polk, Louisiana

=== Campaign participation credit ===
- War on Terrorism: Campaigns to be determined

=== Decorations ===
- Valorous Unit Award for the period 29 December 2007 - 5 January 2009
- Valorous Unit Award for the period 20 July 2011 - 31 July 2011
- Meritorious Unit Commendation for the period 28 November 2007 - 29 December 2008
- Meritorious Unit Commendation for the period 10 November 2010 - 15 October 2011
