= Special Troops Battalion =

Type of United States Army unit

A special troops battalion (STB) is an organic unit of a modular brigade, division (or equivalent), corps or higher echelon United States Army organization. It may comprise companies from different branches of the army, but typically has a Headquarters and Headquarters Company (HHC) and Signal Network Company at a minimum.

== Division headquarters battalion ==
The division headquarters battalion is composed of:

- Headquarters and Headquarters Company
- Operations Company
- Intelligence & Surveillance Company
- Signal Company
- Division Band

The division headquarters battalion is capable of functioning as a tactical headquarters while deployed.

== Brigade combat teams ==
In some divisions these battalions are referred to as either brigade troops battalions (BTB) or brigade special troops battalions (BSTB).

- Headquarters Company is composed of:
  - Battalion Staff
  - Military Police Platoon
  - CBRNE Recon Platoon
  - Medical Platoon
  - Maintenance Platoon
  - Support/Distribution Platoon
- Military Intelligence Company
- Signal Network Support Company
- Engineer Company

Under the brigade organization introduced by Army Chief of Staff GEN Raymond Odierno Infantry and Heavy Brigade Combat Teams special troops battalions will get another combat engineer company and be reflagged as an engineer battalion. The formerly separate companies in a Stryker brigade are to be combined and flagged as an engineer battalion.

== Sustainment brigades ==
In the sustainment brigade, the battalion is composed of an HHC and a signal network support company. When deployed, the battalion will usually have a financial management (FM) company, postal, and a human resources (HR) company attached to it for command and control (C2), administrative and logistics support. Unlike their fellow Combat Sustainment Support Battalions (CSSBs), STBs in Sustainment Brigades are not allocated personnel for a Support Operations section.
