= 87th Infantry Regiment (United States) =

U.S. 87th Mountain Infantry Regiment
- Coat of arms
- Active: 1941 - present
- Country: United States of America
- Branch: Army
- Role: Light infantry
- Part of: 10th Mountain Division
- Garrison/HQ: Fort Drum, NY
- Motto: Vires Montesque Vincimus (We Conquer Powers And Mountains)
- Engagements: World War II; *Kiska; *Italian Campaign; Operation Just Cause (5th Bn); Kuwait; Somalia; Haiti; Bosnia; Operation Enduring Freedom; Operation Iraqi Freedom

Insignia
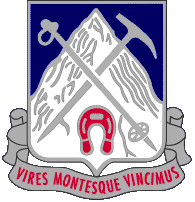
- Identification symbol

The 87th Mountain Infantry Regiment is an infantry regiment in the United States Army. The regiment's 1st and 2nd Battalions are light infantry units assigned to the 1st and 2nd Brigade Combat Teams respectively of the 10th Mountain Division located at Fort Drum, New York. The 3rd Battalion was active in the U.S. Army Reserve in Colorado. The 4th Battalion was a Regular Army unit assigned to the 3rd Brigade Combat Team of the 25th Infantry Division (Light) at Schofield Barracks, Hawaii.

== History ==
=== World War II ===
The 87th Mountain Infantry Battalion was activated on 15 November 1941 at Fort Lewis, Washington, with Lieutenant Colonel Onslow S. Rolfe as the commanding officer. This unit was the first American unit of mountain troops. According to Captain George Earle, 12 officers and one enlisted man had met at Fort Lewis and were designated as the cadre of this battalion. However, another source reports that when its first recruit, Charles McLane, reported for duty at Fort Lewis 8 December of that year, and asked to be directed to his battalion. After some discussion among the staff, the duty officer replied, "Corporal, as far as I can figure out, you are the ski troops."

Over the following months, skilled skiers recruited by the National Ski Patrol, mostly Europeans, some of whom had fled the encroachment of Nazi Germany, arrived at Fort Lewis. Peer Shelton notes that "as the companies of the first battalion filled up—A Company, then B Company, and so on—the roster ... became a kind of who's who of American skiing." Best known of them was Norwegian Torger Tokle. Lieutenant Colonel Rolfe negotiated a deal with the National Park Service to lease Paradise Inn through May for Army use, and the growing battalion trained there.

In the spring of 1942, the unit was reorganized as the 87th Mountain Infantry Regiment and a second and third battalions added. In the summer of 1942 the regiment moved to Camp Hale, Colorado. On 11 June 1943, the regiment departed for Fort Ord where they had training in amphibious landing, then on 27 July the regiment was detached from the 10th Mountain Division and sailed to the Aleutian Islands as part of Amphibious Task Force 9. Also included in Task Force 9 were the First Special Service Force and the 13th Canadian Infantry Brigade. At the conclusion of the campaign, the 87th returned to the United States via Canada and went to Camp Carson, Colorado, arriving by 1 January 1944. It was reunited with the 10th Mountain Division in the middle of February 1944, replacing the 90th Infantry Regiment.

As part of the 10th Mountain Division, the regiment sailed from Newport News 3 January 1945 on the SS West Point for Italy, landing in Naples 13 January. There it took part in the Italian Campaign, seeing action in Operation Encore (19 February—5 March). The regiment took part in the Spring 1945 offensive in Italy, driving north from the Apennine Mountains on 20 April into the Po valley west of Bologna. Using plywood assault boats scrounged by the Divisional engineering unit, on 23 April Company A of the 87th Mountain Infantry was the first Allied unit to cross the Po river. The regiment continued to slice through the disintegrating enemy units, reaching Lake Garda days before the capitulation of the German forces in Italy on 2 May.

While part of the occupying force, the regiment was redeployed east to the vicinity of Udine on 19 May as a show of force to the Yugoslavians, intended to discourage them from occupying territory they disputed with Italy. Until the regiment left for Caporetto, Italy on 17 July, its men served as peace keepers between Yugoslavian soldiers and Italian partisans, manning positions along the Isonzo River from Plezzo to Tolmino. From Caporetto, the regiment proceeded to Naples where they left Italy on the SS Mt. Vernon 2 August.

The Regiment later claimed to have been the first infantry regiment to have fought in both the Pacific and European Theaters.

=== Postwar ===
The 87th Infantry was again assigned to the 10th Mountain Division on 18 June 1948, where it was reactivated as a training division at Fort Riley, Kansas. In January 1954, 10th Division became a standard infantry division and was sent to West Germany. It was inactivated on 14 June 1958 at Fort Benning, GA.

During this era the Army reorganized its combat forces, abandoning three tactical infantry regiments per division for five battle groups of five companies each, known as the Pentomic organization. Effective 1 July 1957 the lineage of Company A, 87th Infantry Regiment was reorganized and redesignated as HHC, 1st Battle Group, 87th Infantry and remained assigned to the 10th Infantry Division. It was relieved effective 14 June 1958 from the 10th and reassigned to the 2d Infantry Division. The unit was reorganized and redesignated on 15 February 1963 as the 1st Battalion, 87th Infantry and relieved on 4 September 1963 from assignment to the 2d Infantry Division and assigned to the 8th Infantry Division. It remained there until it the lineage was inactivated 1 October 1983 in Germany and relieved from assignment to the 8th Infantry Division when the unit was reflagged with a different regimental designation. On 2 May 1987 the battalion was assigned to the 10th Mountain Division and activated at Fort Drum, New York.

The lineage of Company B was inactivated effective 1 July 1957 in Germany, redesignated as HHC, 2d Battle Group, 87th Infantry and relieved from assignment to the 10th Infantry Division. It was redesignated on 25 January 1963 as Headquarters and Headquarters Company, 2d Battalion, 87th Infantry, and assigned to the 2d Infantry Division (organic elements concurrently constituted) and activated on 15 February 1963 at Fort Benning, Georgia. That same year it was relieve from assignment to the 2d Infantry Division and assigned to the 8th Infantry Division, then in Germany, where it was inactivated on 1 May 1966. It was reactivated on 31 August 1973 when the division's 1st Brigade (Airborne) in Mainz-Gonsenheim was taken off jump status and the 2d Battalion (Airborne), 509th Infantry was reorganized and reflagged as the 2d Battalion, (Mechanized) 87th Infantry. On 16 June 1986 the battalion colors were again inactivated when the unit was reflagged as a battalion of the 8th Infantry, pairing it with CONUS-based elements of the 8th Infantry under the 4th Infantry Division at Fort Carson, Colorado. On 2 May 1988 the battalion was assigned to the 10th Mountain Division and activated at Fort Drum, New York.

=== Vietnam War ===
Two companies of 87th Infantry were in Vietnam during the war, both as Rifle Security units. The first was Company C, 87th Infantry, which was attached to the 92d Military Police Battalion guarding Tan Son Nhut Air Base. It was later assigned to Long Binh Post under the U.S. Army Support Command, Saigon. Coming from Fort Lewis, WA, it was in Vietnam from 29 November 1966 to 26 November 1972.

Also coming from Fort Lewis was Company D, 87th Infantry, which was attached to the 95th Military Police Battalion at Long Binh from 1 December 1966 to 6 November 1969. The unit served a second tour in Vietnam from 30 June 1971 to 30 April 1972 when it guarded installations of the 26th General Support Group at Tấn Mỹ.

Both companies had an authorized strength of 151 in 1968 and 160 in 1971.

=== Army Reserve ===
Effective 1 January 1975 the lineage of Company C, 87th Infantry was withdrawn from the Regular Army, allotted to the Army Reserve, redesignated as HHC, 3d Battalion, 87th Infantry and activated at Fort Carson, CO. The battalion was authorized 38 officers, 4 warrant officers and 692 enlisted personnel (later changed to 37, 2, and 754, respectively) with headquarters in Building 2344 at Fort Carson as a unit of the 96th Army Reserve Command.

In addition to the 96th shoulder sleeve insignia, members of the unit wore color 10th Division shoulder sleeve insignia on the left front pocket of fatigue shirts to signify the battalion's historical link to the then-inactive division. Mountain tabs were not worn over the patch as they were almost impossible to find before the division was reactivated at Fort Drum and tabs went into production again.

Units of the 3d Battalion, 87th Infantry were stationed at the following locations:

- HHC, Building 2344, Fort Carson, CO 80913
- Co A, 2501 West Northern Avenue, Pueblo, CO 81004 (Demolished for Asbestos)
- Co B, Building 731, Rocky Mountain Arsenal, Denver, CO 80240
- Co C, 482-28 Road, PO Box 1805, Grand Junction, CO 81501
  - 2d Platoon, 631 Grand Avenue, PO Box 1805, Glenwood Springs, CO 81601
  - 3d Platoon, 109 West 19th Street, PO Box 378, Durango, CO 81301
- Support Company, Building 2344, Fort Carson, CO 80913

A detachment of the battalion's Company C was located at 158 Bodo Drive, Durango, CO 81301; it was inactivated on 16 October 1984.

Company C moved from the Denver Federal Center to 10455 East 25th Avenue, Aurora, CO 80011 effective 1 June 1985, and then to 1788 Helena Street, also in Aurora, effective 1 February 1990.

The battalion was ordered into active military service on 17 January 1991. It arrived at Fort Carson for training on 19 January 1991 and moved to Germany on 5 February 1991. There it performed anti-terrorist security missions for V Corps. It returned to Fort Carson on 1 May 1991, and personnel were released for terminal leave on 15 May 1991 as the battalion reverted to reserve status.

By early 1991 HHC had relocated to Building 8932, Duncan-Selix USAR Center, Fort Carson, CO. Effective 16 September 1991 the Combat Support Company (formerly Support Company) was inactivated.

The battalion was organized effective 16 September 1992 to consist of 34 officers, 2 warrant officers, and 547 enlisted personnel as a light infantry unit.

During the post-Cold War drawdown, when most reserve component combat arms units were concentrated in the Army National Guard, the battalion was inactivated on 15 September 1994 at Fort Carson.

=== Schofield Barracks ===
Effective 16 June 1986 the lineage of World War II's Company D was redesignated as HHC, 4th Battalion, 87th Infantry Regiment and assigned to the 25th Infantry Division at Schofield Barracks, HI, as part of its 3rd Brigade Combat Team. The Catamounts deployed from Schofield Barracks in August 1991 to the Sinai Peninsula. Task Force 4/87 performed peace keeping duties as the USBATT assigned to the Multinational Force & Observers at South Camp near Sharm el Sheikh, Egypt. In February 1992, after their six-month rotation in the Sinai Desert, they redeployed back to Schofield Barracks. The Catamounts deployed again for their second real-world mission in 13 months. In the aftermath of Hurricane Iniki, a Category 4 storm which made landfall on 11 September 1992, the battalion was sent to Kauai and it effectively provided hurricane relief for immediate needs of the local population. Assistance had arrived before any requests had been made by the local officials for aid. For the next month, following Iniki's decimation of Kauai, the soldiers helped in various capacities and distributed water and MRE's. The battalion redeployed back to Oahu at the mission's end in October 1992. The 4th battalion was deactivated at Schofield Barracks and relieved from the 25th Infantry Division effective 15 July 1995.

=== Panama ===
The lineage of World War II's Company E, 87th Infantry Regiment was redesignated effective 1 May 1987 as HHC, 5th Battalion, 87th Infantry, assigned to the 193rd Infantry Brigade in Panama and activated. Concurrently the 1st Battalion, 187th Infantry was inactivated and its personnel and equipment were reflagged as 5-87th. The battalion was relieved from assignment to the inactivating 193d Infantry Brigade on 15 July 1994 and was itself inactivated on 15 September 1999.

=== Operation Just Cause ===
On 20 December 1989 Task Force "Wildcat" (5th Battalion, 87th Infantry) and Task Force "Bayonet" (193rd Infantry Brigade), attacked and seized critical objectives in Panama City for Operation Just Cause. Bravo Company 5/87th Infantry 193rd Infantry Brigade, Code Name "Jungle Cats" seized the Balboa DENI (Direccion Especial Nacional de Investigaciones), the PDF's investigative branch, the DNTT (Direccion Nacional de Transporte Terrestre, which served as the headquarters of the National Police) was seized by Charlie Company 5/87th Infantry 193rd Brigade, Code Name "Panthers", the Ancon DENI. Alpha Company 5/87th Infantry 193rd Infantry Brigade, Code Name "Jaguars" seized the PDF Engineer complex on Albrook AFB(I know because I was there). Each of these objectives lay astride the key lines of communication into the center of Panama city. In the days following the initial assault, TF 5-87 conducted stability operations and was involved in the security of the Santa Felipe, Santa Anna, El Marana, and Chorillo sections of the city. During the remainder of the operation, TF Wildcat secured key sites in Panama City and reacted to security and civil military tasking.

=== Operation Restore Hope ===
12 December 1992, 2-87th Infantry, with Co A, 1-87th infantry, deployed to Somalia in support of Operation Restore Hope as the first Army units on the ground. Co A, 1-87 was attached to 2-87 Infantry to comprise TF 2-87. TF 2-87 conducted numerous missions, including several air assault operations (such as an airfield seizure in Beledweyne, Somalia), cordon and search operations, ambushes, search and destroy missions and quick reaction force missions. Members of TF 2-87 were first awarded the Combat Infantryman Badge for actions in the Mogadishu suburb of Afgooye in January 1993. Both 2-87th and 1-87th engaged in numerous running battles with Somali guerrilla fighters all over southern Somalia. In February and March 1993, both 2-87th Inf. and 1-87 Inf. went to the aid of 3-14 Inf. and Belgian forces in the southern port city of Kismayo, after fighting erupted between rival factions. Although 1-87th Infantry never deployed to Somalia as a unit, its companies deployed as attachments to other units and participated in numerous missions, including C Co 1-87 (while attached to 2-14th Inf) and the Battle of Mogadishu.

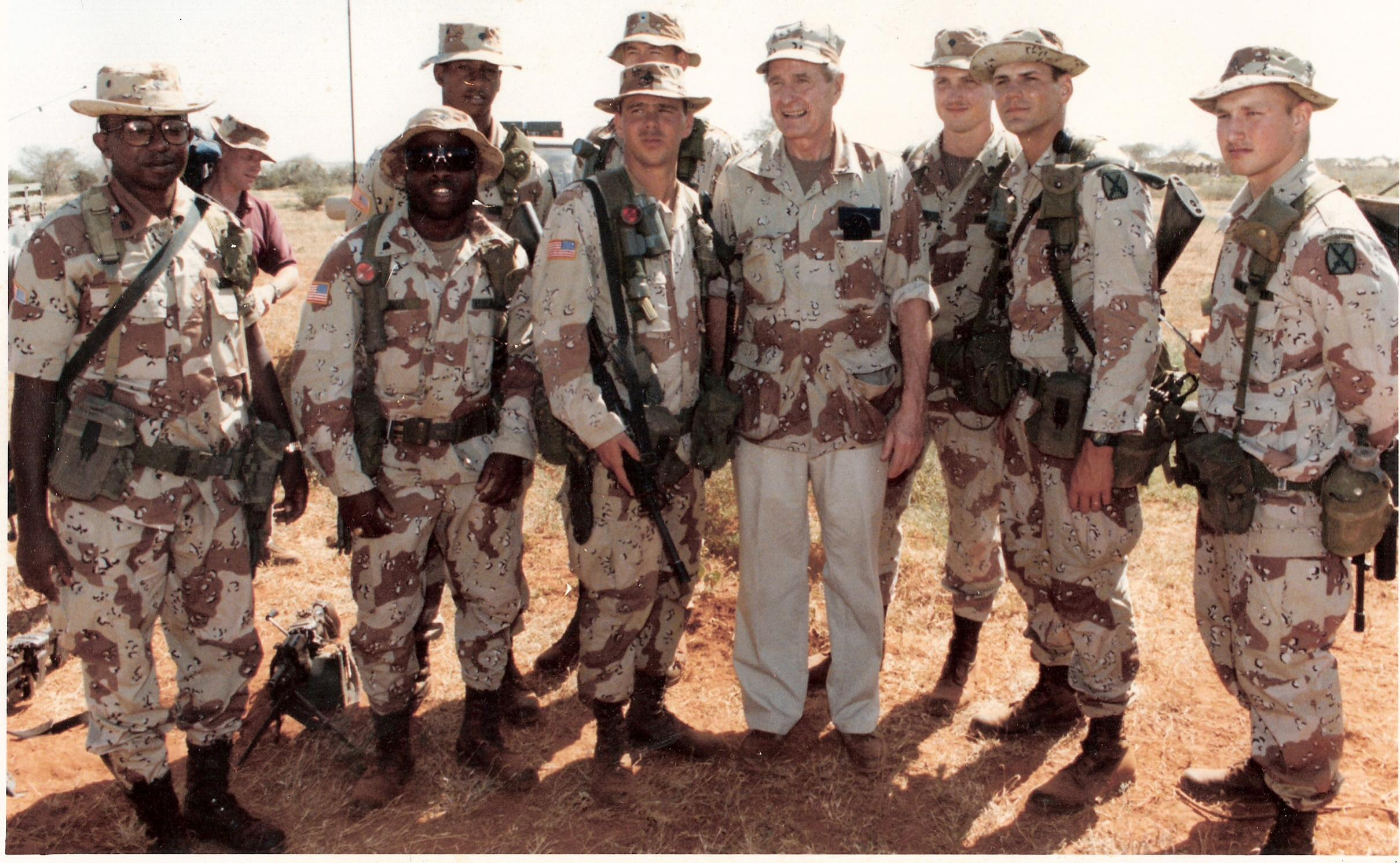
1-87th Infantry with President George Bush

=== Operation Uphold Democracy ===
In September 1994, the 1st Brigade of the 10th Mountain Division, which included 1-87 Infantry, conducted the Army's first Air Assault operation from the deck of a naval vessel, the USS Dwight D. Eisenhower (CVN-69), in support of Operation Uphold Democracy in Haiti. This was the Army's first air operation from a naval vessel since the Doolittle Raid of World War II.

=== Twenty-first century ===
In the mid-1990s elements of the 87th Infantry trained in Pakistan, Panama, Kyrgyzstan, and Uzbekistan. In 1999 Co B, 1-87 was deployed to Bosnia-Herzegovina in support of Operation Joint Forge. Co C, 1-87 completed a similar deployment from October 1998 to March 1999.

Other combat and peace keeping deployments of the 1st and 2d Battalions of the 87th Infantry included Iraq (1991, present), Somalia (1992–93), Haiti (1994-95), Bosnia and Afghanistan (particularly Operation Anaconda, where 1-87 was the first unit on the ground during the initial invasion of Afghanistan). A detachment (3d Platoon) from Co C, 1-87 was attached to the 2d Battalion, 14th Infantry and served as the Quick Reaction Force (QRF) during the Battle of Mogadishu. The unit never deployed to Somalia as a whole, but all of 1st Battalion was attached to other units while deployed to Somalia, including 2-87 IN, and the 2d Battalion, 14th Infantry.

The 1st Battalion deployed in support of Operation Enduring Freedom from July 2003 to May 2004. Although originally slotted as a six-month deployment the unit was extended to ten months due to the invasion of Iraq in 2003. From 2005 to 2006 1-87 IN deployed to Baghdad, Iraq in support of Operation Iraqi Freedom III-IV.

1-87 deployed in 2007–2008 to the northern Kirkuk area of Iraq, near the small city of Hawijah. The unit was part of the "Surge" and remained in Kirkuk for 15 months in support of Operation Iraqi Freedom VI.

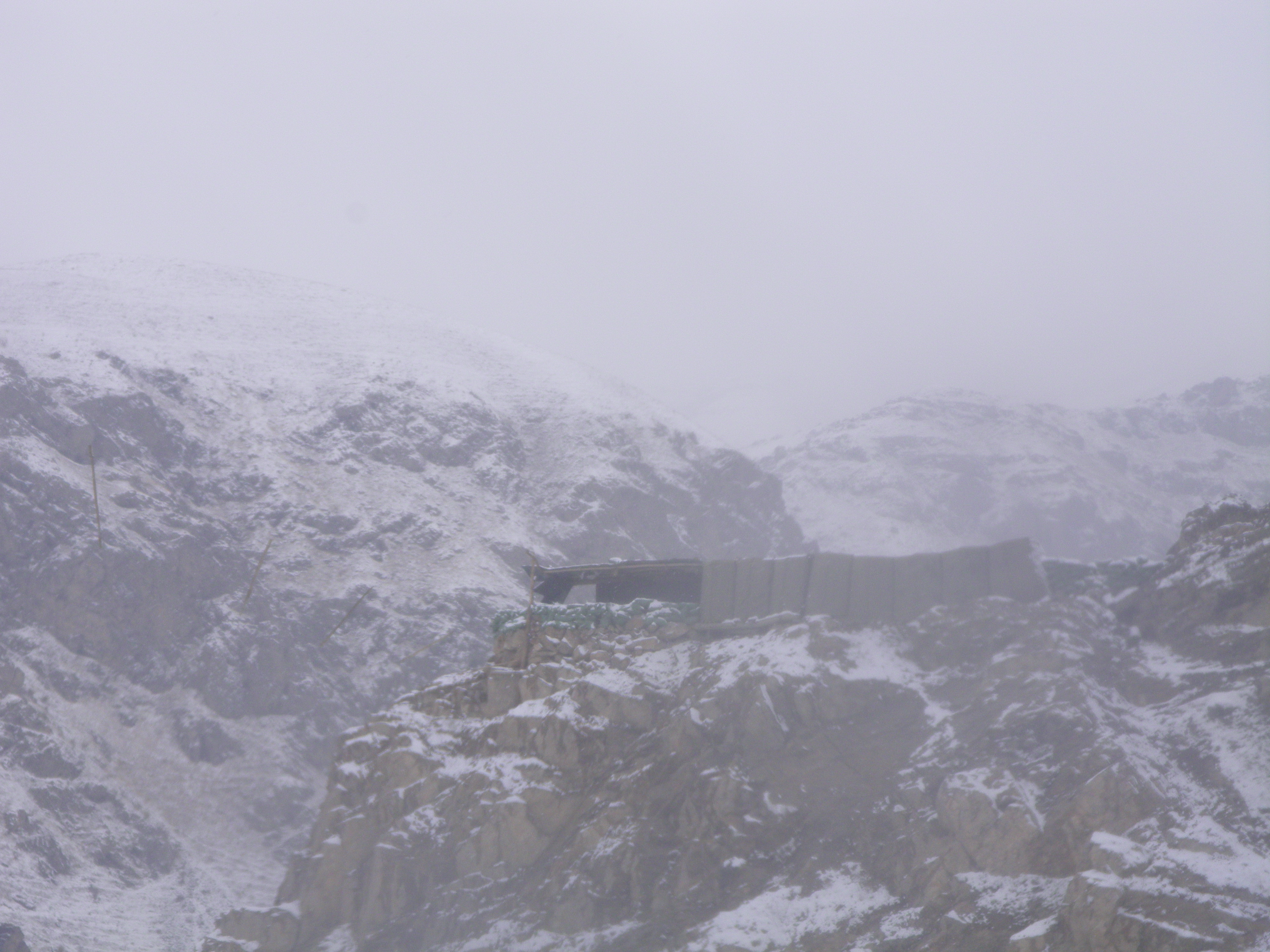
Blacksheep Company established numerous mountainous COPs in 2010 and 2011 to repel insurgent activity in the region.

1-87 IN deployed to Northern Afghanistan in early 2010 for 13 months. The unit's mission was to support Operation Enduring Freedom by partnering with ISAF forces to eliminate Taliban and HIG forces and help establish Afghan government influence in the region. The battalion was tasked with clearing and securing several districts including Aliabad, Char-a-dara, and the City of Kunduz aiding the Afghan security forces in doing so. 1-87 was sent to clear the valleys of Shahabuddin, Gortepa, and Dahana-e-Ghuri. The battalion successfully cleared villages of Taliban presence then established Afghan local police outposts in the newly acquired areas. This task took several weeks, starting with securing the district of Aliabad to the south to impede the Talibans ability to reinforce and resupply the Gortepa valley. By the end of March 2011, 1-87 had returned to Fort Drum. Notably, Blacksheep Company was responsible for numerous large-scale engagements, including the Battle of Shahabuddin and securing a High-Value Target (HVT) after an air assault raid. This deployment was transformational to the Counterinsurgency in Northern Afghanistan campaign of the war. The New York Times followed 1-87 throughout the deployment in order to produce an online feature titled "A Year at War."

1-87 IN deployed to Ghazni Province, Afghanistan in 2012 for 12 months.

1-87 IN deployed in 2015–2016 with 1st Brigade Combat Team to Iraq in support of Operation Inherent Resolve.

Charlie company 1-87 IN deployed to Cameroon in August 2017 while the rest of the battalion deployed to Afghanistan in late September of the same year.

1-87 IN deployed to Afghanistan in March 2020 with 1st Brigade Combat Team in support of Operation Freedom's Sentinel.

1-87 IN deployed to Iraq in May 2022 with 1st Brigade Combat Team in support of Operation Inherent Resolve. Alpha company 1-87 IN deployed to Baghdad, Iraq during the 2022 Baghdad clashes.

== Lineage ==
Constituted 31 July 1918 in the Regular Army as the 87th Infantry and assigned to the 18th Infantry Division. Organized September 1918 at Camp Dodge, Iowa from personnel of the 35th Infantry. Relieved from the 19th Division and demobilized 27 January 1919 at Camp Dodge.

Constituted 15 November 1941 in the Army of the United States as the 87th Infantry Mountain Regiment; concurrently 1st Battalion activated at Fort Lewis, Washington. Redesignated 12 May 1942 as the 87th Mountain Infantry Regiment. Regiment (less 1st Battalion) activated 25 May 1942 at Fort Lewis, Washington. assigned to the 10th Mountain Division, 22 February 1944.

Reorganized and Redesignated 87th Mountain Infantry Regiment and assigned to the 10th Mountain Division 6 November 1944. Inactivated 21 June 1945 at Camp Carson, Colorado. Redesignated 87th Infantry and assigned to 10th Infantry Division 18 June 1948, allotted to the regular Army 25 June 1948. Activated 1 July 1948 at Fort Riley, Kansas. Relieved from the 10th Infantry Division 1 July 1957 and reorganized as the 87th Infantry, a parent regiment under the Combat Arms Regimental System.

== Campaign streamers ==
World War II
- Aleutian Islands
- North Apennines
- Po Valley

Vietnam

- Counteroffensive, Phase II
- Counteroffensive, Phase III
- Tet Counteroffensive,
- Counteroffensive, Phase IV
- Counteroffensive, Phase V
- Counteroffensive, Phase VI
- Tet69/Counteroffensive
- Summer-Fall 1969
- Winter-Spring 1970
- Sanctuary Counteroffensive
- Counteroffensive, Phase VII
- Consolidation I
- Consolidation II
- Cease Fire

Armed Forces Expeditions

- Panama
- Somalia

War on Terrorism:

Afghanistan

- Consolidation I
- Consolidation II
- Consolidation III

Iraq

- Iraqi Governance
- National Resolution

== Decorations ==
- Valorous Unit Award, (Company A, Company B, Company C, Company D. 1st Battalion 87th Infantry cited; PERMANENT ORDERS 236–02; August 2011)
- Meritorious Unit Commendation, Streamer embroidered SAIGON AREA 1966–1967 (Company C. 87th Infantry cited; DA GO 17,1968)
- Meritorious Unit Commendation, Streamer embroidered VIETNAM 1967 (Company D. 87th Infantry cited; DA GO 54,1968)
- Meritorious Unit Commendation, Streamer embroidered VIETNAM 1967–1968 (Company C. 87th Infantry cited; DA GO 48,1969)
- Meritorious Unit Commendation, Streamer embroidered VIETNAM 1968 (Company D. 87th Infantry cited; DA GO 39,1970)
- Meritorious Unit Commendation, (Company A, Company B, Company C. 1st Battalion, 87th Infantry cited; PERMANENT ORDERS 117–03; April 2011)

== Distinctive unit insignia ==
- Description

A silver color metal and enamel device 1 1/4 inches (3.2 cm) in height overall consisting of a shield blazoned: Azure, on a mountain issuant from base Argent, an ice axe, and ski pole in saltirewise, points to base Proper, a mule shoe, points to base Gules. Attached below the shield is a silver scroll inscribed "VIRES MONTESQUE VINCIMUS" in red letters.

- Symbolism

The snow-capped mountains is where the organization first received its specialized training and the normal home of mountains troops. The crossed ski pole and ice axe are symbolic of the tools used by mountain troops and the mule shoe indicates the pack element of the organization. The 87th Mountain Infantry Regiment was the only organization of its kind indicated by the single red horseshoe.

- Background

The distinctive unit insignia was originally approved for the 87th Mountain Infantry Regiment on 21 October 1942. It was redesignated for the 87th Infantry Regiment on 13 December 1948.

== Coat of arms ==
- Blazon
  - Shield: Azure, on a mountain issuant from base Argent, an ice axe, and ski pole in saltirewise, points to base Proper, a horseshoe, points to base Gules.
  - Crest: On a wreath Argent and Azure rising from a castle tower of three battlements Gules masoned Or charged with a fountain, a demi-catamountain proper supporting a lance of the fourth with a split pennon parted fesswise of Vert, of the first and of the third.
  - Motto VIRES MONTESQUE VINCIMUS (We Conquer Powers and Mountains).
- Symbolism
  - Shield: The shield bears a snow-capped mountain to represent both the region where the organization first received its specialized training and the normal home of mountain troops. The crossed ski pole and ice axe are symbolic of the tools used by mountain troops, while the horseshoe indicates the pack element of the organization. The fact that the 87th Mountain Infantry Regiment was the first organization of its kind is indicated by the single red horseshoe.
  - Crest: The red castle tower is reminiscent of the battle of Castel d'Aiano in Northern Italy, a bloody struggle against prepared positions, rough terrain, heavily mined areas, and enemy artillery fire; its three battlements stand for campaigns in the Aleutians, Northern Apennines, and Po Valley. The fountain (wavy white and blue-striped disc) represents the first crossing of the Po River which brought the 87th to the foothills of the Alps. The catamountain or wildcat personifies the fighting spirit, cunning, and aggressiveness of the Mountain Infantry, and the lance and pennant allude to the arms of the province of Bologna where the unit emerged after fighting their way out of the Apennine Mountains.
- Background

The coat of arms was originally approved for the 87th Mountain Infantry Regiment on 21 October 1942. It was redesignated for the 87th Infantry Regiment on 13 December 1948. On 21 May 1956 the symbolism was amended to correct the translation of the motto. On 7 December 1964 the coat of arms was amended to change the wording in the blazonry of the shield and to add the crest. The insignia was amended to correct the translation of the motto and update the description on 26 February 2016.

== Current units ==
- 1st Battalion, 87th Infantry Regiment
- 2nd Battalion, 87th Infantry Regiment

== Notable former members ==
- Morley Nelson, World War II
- James Earl Jones, The Cold War
