= Sean Parnell (spokesperson) =

American government official

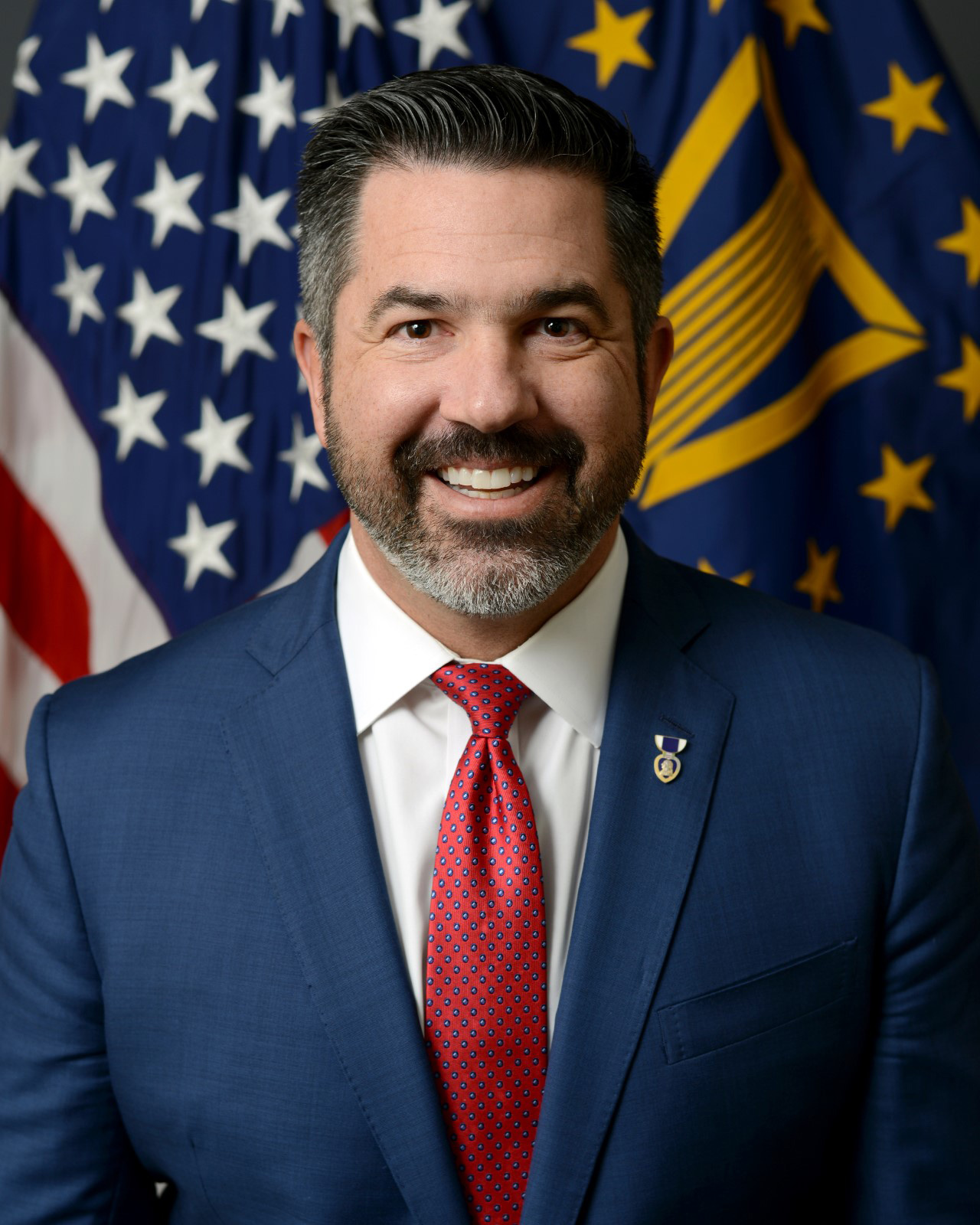
- Official portrait, 2025

Assistant to the Secretary of Defense for Public Affairs
- Incumbent
- Assumed office February 3, 2025
- President: Donald Trump
- Preceded by: Chris Meagher

Personal details
- Born: Richard Sean Parnell; July 1981 (age 45) Pittsburgh, Pennsylvania, U.S.
- Party: Republican
- Spouse: Melanie Parnell (m. 2023)
- Children: 3
- Education: Clarion University (attended); University of Pittsburgh (attended); Duquesne University (BA, MA)

Military service
- Branch/service: United States Army
- Years of service: 2004–2010
- Rank: Captain

Richard Sean Parnell is a former United States Army Captain and author currently serving as the assistant to the secretary of defense for public affairs since February 2025. He was the Republican nominee for Pennsylvania's 17th congressional district in 2020.

== Early life and education ==
Richard Sean Parnell was born in Pittsburgh, Pennsylvania. After serving in the U.S. Army from 2004 to 2010, he pursued undergraduate studies at Clarion University, the University of Pittsburgh, and Duquesne University, as well as graduate education at Duquesne University.

== Military service ==
After receiving his commission through the Army Reserve Officers' Training Corps program at Duquesne University, Parnell led 3rd Platoon, B Company, 2nd Battalion, 87th Infantry Regiment, 3rd Brigade Combat Team, 10th Mountain Division. The company was based near the Pakistani border in Barmal District of Paktika Province on an extended 16-month deployment. After the deployment, Parnell was awarded two Bronze Star Medals and a Purple Heart. Parnell left active duty as a lieutenant and was discharged as a captain from the Individual Ready Reserve. He authored the book Outlaw Platoon with John R. Bruning based on his experiences.

== Political career ==
Parnell ran for Pennsylvania's 17th congressional district in 2020, narrowly losing to Democratic incumbent Conor Lamb.

The following year, Parnell announced he would run in the 2022 Republican primary for Pennsylvania's open senate seat. He was endorsed by Donald Trump. Parnell suspended his candidacy in November 2021, amid allegations, by his estranged wife, that he had abused her and her children

In February 2025, President Trump announced via Truth Social that Parnell would serve as the chief Pentagon spokesman under his administration. In addition to his primary role as assistant to the secretary of defense for public affairs, Parnell also serves as a senior advisor to Secretary of Defense Pete Hegseth. In April 2026, New York Post and The Hill reported that Parnell has privately expressed interest in the position of Army Secretary Daniel P. Driscoll, amid rumors of tension between Driscoll and Hegseth.

=== Electoral history ===
2020 United States House of Representatives election for Pennsylvania's seventeenth congressional district
Party	Candidate	Votes	%
Democratic	Conor Lamb	222,253	51.1
Republican	Sean Parnell	212,284	48.9
Total votes		434,537	100.0

== Bibliography ==
=== Nonfiction ===
- Outlaw Platoon: Heroes, Renegades, Infidels, and the Brotherhood of War in Afghanistan (2013) (ISBN 978-0062066404)

=== Fiction ===
- Man of War: An Electrifying Military Thriller Full of Intrigue and International Espionage (2018) (ISBN 978-0062668806)
- All Out War: A Novel (2019) (ISBN 978-0062668837)
- One True Patriot: A Novel (2020) (ISBN 978-0062986597)
- Left for Dead: A Novel (2021) (ISBN 978-0062986634)
