= Outlaw Platoon =

2012 war story memoir written by Sean Parnell and John R. Bruning

- First edition
- Author: Sean Parnell, John R. Bruning
- Language: English
- Subject: Military history
- Publisher: Morrow/HarperCollins
- Publication date: 2012
- Publication place: United States
- Pages: 405
- ISBN: 978-0-06-206639-8

Outlaw Platoon is a 2012 war story memoir written by Captain Sean Parnell and author John R. Bruning. The book details Parnell's 2006–2007 experiences as an infantry platoon leader during the War in Afghanistan.

After receiving his commission through the Army Reserve Officers' Training Corps program at Duquesne University, Parnell led 3rd Platoon, B Company, 2nd Battalion, 87th Infantry Regiment, 3rd Brigade Combat Team, 10th Mountain Division. The company was based near the Pakistani border in Barmal District of Paktika Province on an extended 16-month deployment. After the deployment, Parnell was awarded two Bronze Star Medals and a Purple Heart. Parnell left duty as a lieutenant and retired as a captain. Before embarking on Outlaw Platoon. Parnell's coauthor, military historian John R. Bruning, embedded himself with a unit in Afghanistan in 2010 in preparation for writing the book for Parnell.

The book was discussed as part of the Commandant's Book Club at the United States Military Academy in 2013.

Parnell discussed writing the book for an episode of Pritzker Military Presents and for the Episode 192 of the Jocko Podcast.
