= 95th Military Police Battalion =

US Army battalion

Coordinates: 49.528648°N 7.866347°E

- Distinctive unit insignia
- Active: 8 July 1945 – 10 June 2014
- Country: United States
- Branch: United States Army
- Type: Military police
- Role: Military police
- Size: Battalion
- Part of: 18th Military Police Brigade; 21st Theater Sustainment Command
- Garrison/HQ: Kaiserslautern, Germany
- Nickname: Superstars
- Motto: SECURITY LAW ORDER.
- Colors: Green and Gold
- Engagements: World War II; Vietnam; Korea; Operation Iraqi Freedom; Operation Enduring Freedom
- Decorations: Meritorious Unit Commendation (Army) for KOREA 1950–1951; Meritorious Unit Commendation (Army) for VIETNAM 1967; Meritorious Unit Commendation (Army) for VIETNAM 1968; Army Superior Unit Award for 2001–2002; Republic of Vietnam Cross of Gallantry with Palm for VIETNAM 1966–1972

Commanders
- Commander: Lieutenant Colonel James H. Walker II
- Command Sergeant Major: Command Sergeant Major James W. Breckinridge

Insignia
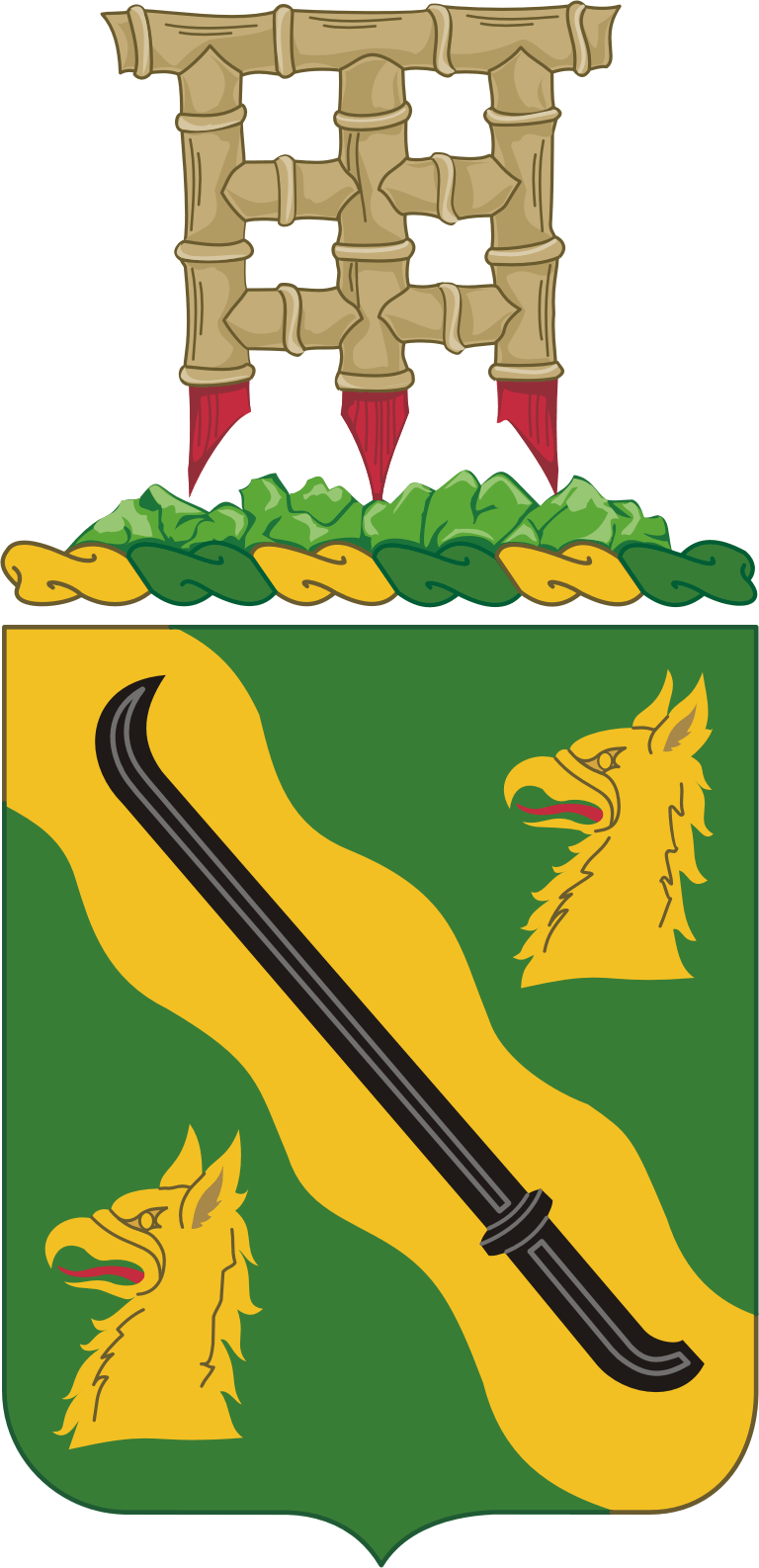
- Coat of Arms

The 95th Military Police Battalion was the largest, most geographically dispersed Military Police battalion in the United States Army. It was last located in Sembach, Germany, the unit fell under the command of the 18th Military Police Brigade.

== Subordinate units were ==
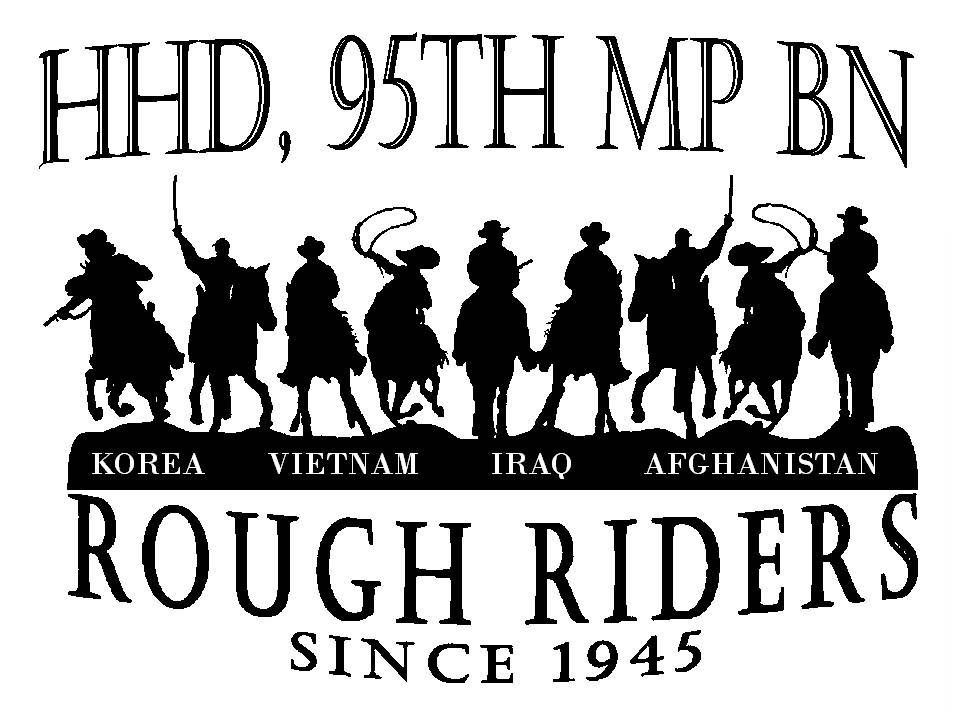
- HHD 95th Military Police Battalion, Rough Riders – Sembach
- 64th Military Police Detachment/Company, Guardians of the World – Bremerhaven
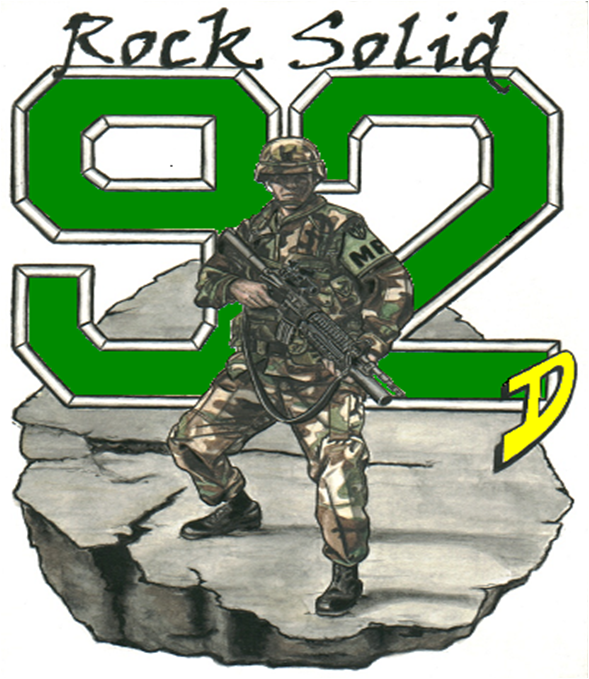
- 92nd Military Police Company, Rock Solid – Baumholder
  - 23rd MP Platoon, Savages
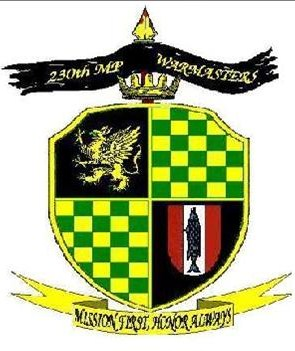
- 230th Military Police Company, Warmasters – Sembach
  - 148th MP Platoon, Wiesbaden
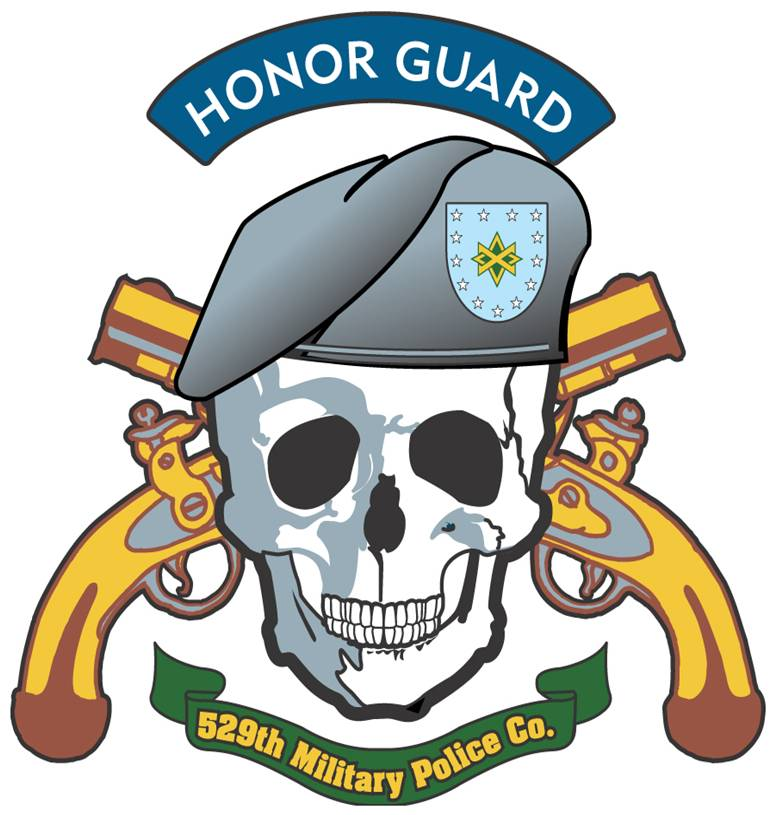
- 529th Military Police Company, Honor Guard – Heidelberg
- 554th Military Police Company, War Dawgs – Stuttgart
- 272nd Military Police Company, Fighting Deuce – Mannheim
- 560th Military Police Company, Road Runners – Mannheim
- 570th Military Police Company, Railway Guard – Mannheim
- 59th Military Police Company – Pirmasens
- United States Army Corrections Facility-Europe, Mannheim
- 66th Military Police Company, (FIGHTIN' DOUBLE SIX), Karlsruhe

== Lineage ==
- Activated 8 July 1945 in Germany
- Inactivated 24 June 1946 in Germany
- Allotted 24 October 1950 to the Regular Army
- Activated 30 October 1950 in Korea
- Inactivated 15 August 1954 in Korea
- Activated 25 November 1965 at Fort Riley, Kansas
- Inactivated 13 April 1972 at Fort Lewis, Washington
- Activated 21 March 1973 in Germany
- Inactivated 10 June 2014 at Sembach, Germany

== Unit honors ==
=== Campaign participation credit ===
Korean War:

- UN Offensive
- CCF Intervention
- First UN Offensive
- CCF Spring Offensive
- UN Summer–Fall Offensive
- Second Korean Winter
- Korea, Summer–Fall 1952
- Third Korean Winter
- Korea, Summer 1953

Vietnam War:

- Counteroffensive
- Counteroffensive, Phase II
- Counteroffensive, Phase III
- Tet Counteroffensive
- Counteroffensive, Phase IV
- Counteroffensive, Phase V
- Counteroffensive, Phase VI
- Tet 69/Counteroffensive
- Summer–Fall 1969
- Winter–Spring 1970
- Sanctuary Counteroffensive
- Counteroffensive, Phase VII
- Consolidation I
- Consolidation II
- Cease–Fire

War on Terrorism:

- Iraq (Operation Iraqi Freedom - OIF)
- Afghanistan (Operation Enduring Freedom - OEF)

=== Decorations ===
Ribbon	Award	Year	Notes
	Meritorious Unit Commendation	1950–1951	Korea
	Meritorious Unit Commendation	1967	Vietnam
	Meritorious Unit Commendation	1968	Vietnam
	Superior Unit Award	2006–2007	Iraq
	Republic of Vietnam Cross of Gallantry with Palm	1966–1972	Vietnam

== Heraldry ==
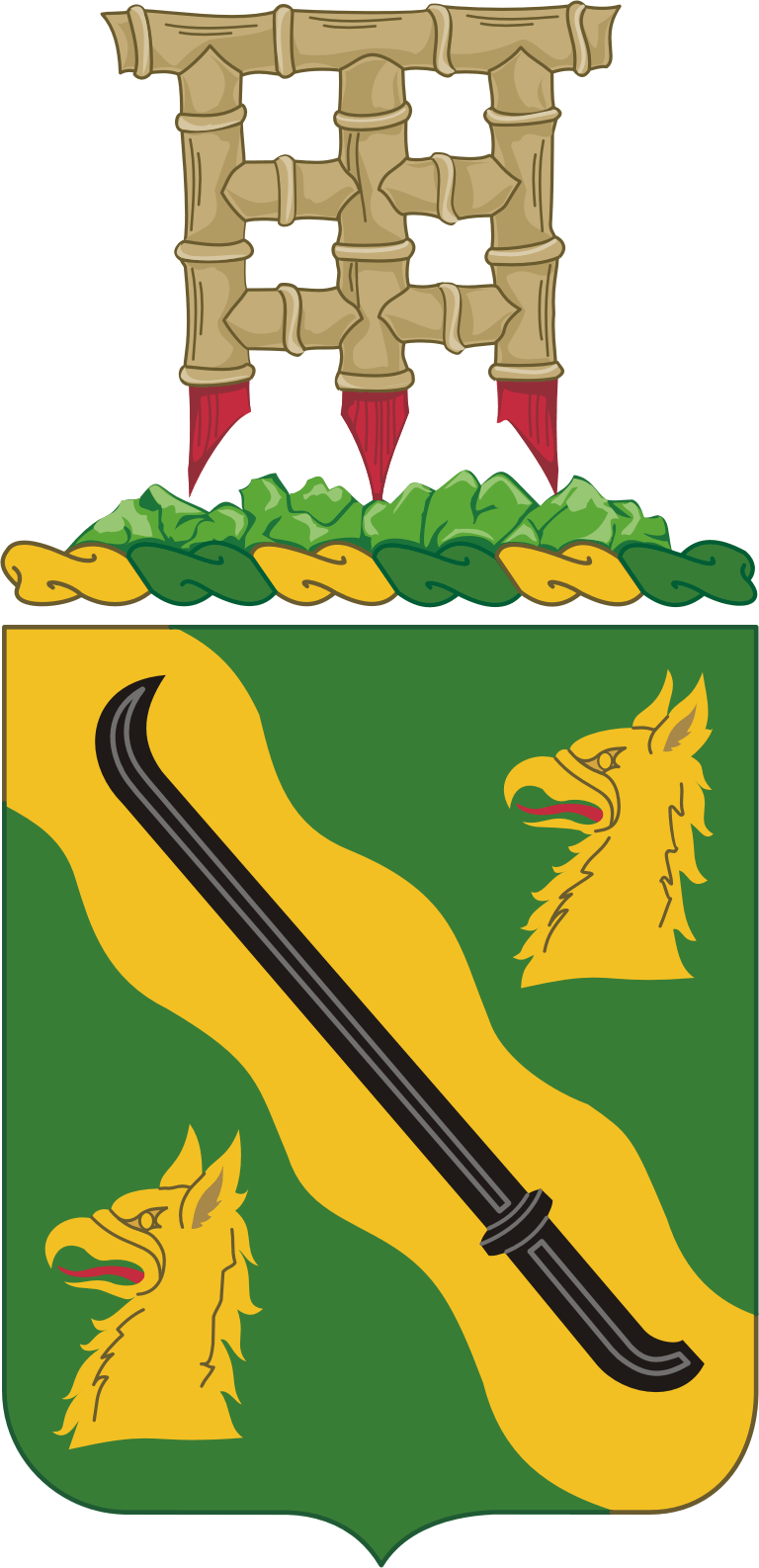

=== Motto ===
SUPERSTARS.

=== Distinctive unit insignia ===
The distinctive unit insignia was approved on 26 April 1966.

A gold colored metal and enamel device 1 1/8 inches (2.9 cm) in height overall consisting of a green four pointed star surmounted by two gold clamps in saltire.

Green and yellow are the colors used for the Military Police. The crossed clamps designating a restrictive or restraining force and the star for guidance symbolize the mission of the Military Police Battalion.

=== Coat of arms ===
The coat of arms was approved on 24 April 1974.

==== Shield ====
Vert, on a bend wavy Or between two griffins' heads couped of the last an oriental sword Sable.

Green and yellow (gold) are the colors used for the Military Police Corps. The griffin is a mythological creature famed for the attributes of vigilance, courage and strength and alludes to the unit. The color black suggests the robes of justices and the sword denotes leadership and military. The griffin heads, wavy bend and oriental sword together refer to the unit's three activations overseas: two in Europe and one in Asia.

==== Crest ====
On a wreath of the colors Or and Vert, a rocky mound of the last and thereon a bamboo portcullis (gate) of three perpendicular bars Proper spiked Gules.

The bamboo portcullis alludes to Asia and the red spikes represent the Meritorious Unit Citations, one for Korea and two for Vietnam. The rocky mound and portcullis symbolize the adverse terrain, guerrilla attacks and transient camps during the unit's mission in Korea. The portcullis and spikes also refer to security at Long Binh Ammunition Depot and establishment of law and order for Long Binh Post during the Vietnam War.

== HHD, 95th MP Bn ==
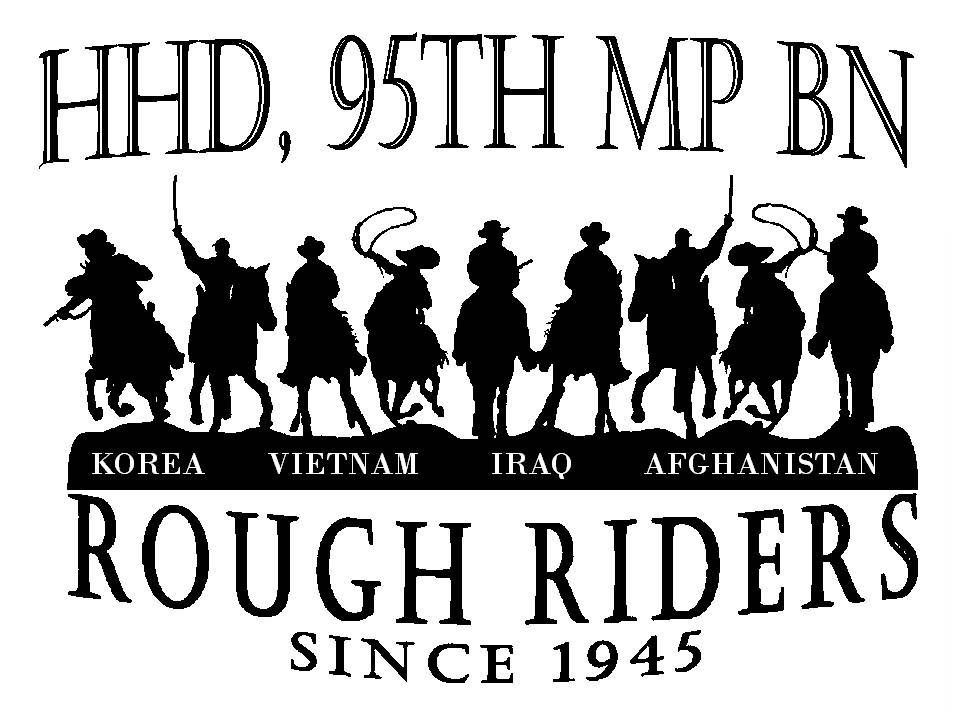

The Headquarters and Headquarters Detachment for the 95th Military Police Battalion are the Rough Riders. The Detachment was colocated with the HHC 18th Military Police Brigade on Sembach Kaserne at time of inactivation 10 Jun 2014.
