= 2nd Battalion, 87th Infantry Regiment =

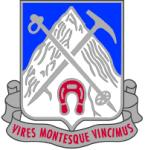
- 87th Infantry Regiment distinctive unit insignia
- Active: 1942 – present
- Country: (United States)
- Allegiance: United States
- Branch: United States Army
- Type: Battalion
- Role: Infantry
- Nickname: "Catamounts"
- Mottos: Vires Montesque Vincimus (We Conquer Men and Mountains)
- Engagements: Aleutian Islands; North Apennines; Po Valley; War on Terrorism
- Decorations: Meritorious Unit Commendation(2); Valorous Unit Award (2)

Commanders
- Current commander: LTC Christopher Wallgren

The 2nd Battalion, 87th Infantry Regiment is a United States Army infantry battalion. Originally formed during World War II, the battalion took part in the Aleutian and Italian campaigns before being deactivated after the war. Later, however, it was reactivated and in recent times has served in the Sinai Peninsula and in Afghanistan.

== Unit history ==
=== World War II ===
==== Formation ====
The battalion was formed in May 1942, several months after the American entry in World War II the 87th Infantry, Mountain, 2nd Battalion, Reinforced at Fort Lewis, Washington. It along with 1–87 Mountain Infantry composed the 87th Mountain Infantry. The battalion was made up of world-famous skiers, mountaineers, forest rangers, trappers, lumberman, guides, cowboys, muleskinners, horseman, and Regular Army cadre.

As the battalion was conducting maneuvers in Jolon, California in November 1942, the army was preparing a brand new camp to house the 87th on the Continental Divide at Camp Hale, Colorado, at 9,480 feet (2,890 m) above sea level. 2–87 moved to Camp Hale in late December 1942. During the winter of 1942–43, the battalion conducted extreme cold weather and high altitude training and tested over one hundred types of equipment and vehicles.

==== Aleutian campaign ====
On 11 June 1943, the battalion deployed to Fort Ord, California for amphibious training in preparation of combat operations. Within weeks after this training, the battalion sailed to the Aleutian Island as part of Amphibious Technical Force Nine. The 2–87 Mountain Infantry took part in regimental amphibious assault of Kiska on 1–16 August 1943 and occupied the island until withdrawal to Camp Carson, Colorado in December 1943.

In February 1944, the battalion joined the 10th Light Division (later 10th Mountain Division) and moved again to Camp Hale. In the winter of 1944, the battalion took part in a maneuver in sub-zero weather. In one night alone, over 100 cases of frostbite were evacuated. All men who completed the maneuver were commended.

==== Italian campaign ====
In late June 1944, the battalion moved with the newly designated 87th Infantry Regiment, Light as a part of the 10th Mountain Division to Camp Swift, Texas. On 20 December 1944, 2–87 entrained from Camp Swift to Newport News, Virginia and embarked on the USS West Point. The battalion sailed for Naples, Italy on 4 January 1945.

The battalion entered combat on the Italian Front 28 January 1945 as part of Lieutenant General Lucian Truscott's U.S. Fifth Army. On the night of 19 February after 17 days of patrolling in the mountains on snowshoes and skis, the battalion was instrumental in the capture on Mount Belvedere and other key mountain peaks in a night attack.

On 4–5 March, 2–87 participated in their second offensive by capturing Mad Na Di Brasa and Castel d'Aiano. Whereas the Battle of Belvedere was a night attack, the Battle of Castel d'Aiano was a deadly struggle in the sunlight, from bunker to bunker, hill to hill, objective to objective.

During the first two weeks of April 1945, the battalion planned and prepared for their part in the final spring offensive of the Fifth Army in Italy. The intent was to break through the northern Apennine, drive the Germans out of the mountains, and secure the wide Po Valley. The battalion fought continuously from 4 April to 2 May over mountainous terrain covering 140 miles (230 km).

The battalion learned of the surrender of all German forces at suppertime on 2 May 1945. The Germans had been impressed by the 10th Mountain Infantry soldiers. Using the words from captured enemy documents, the Germans knew they had been up against mountain troops. They believed them to be a hand-picked elite corps, made up of physically superior soldiers, sports personalities and young men from politically significant American families. It was no accident that Lieutenant General Fridolin von Senger und Etterlin insisted on surrendering in person only to Major General George Price Hays, the Commanding General of what the general called the best American formation in Italy—the 10th Mountain Division.

From May–July 1945, the battalion conducted occupation duties. In July, the battalion was ordered to duty in the Pacific. 2–87 sailed from Italy on 2 August and arrived in the United States on 11 August. On 14 August, the battalion learned that the Japanese had surrendered and that the war was over.

=== Postwar ===
The 2nd Battalion, 87th Mountain Infantry was inactivated in November 1945 at Camp Carson, Colorado. On 18 June 1948, the battalion was designated the 2nd Battalion, 87th Infantry and again assigned to the 10th Infantry Division at Fort Riley, Kansas. In June 1958, the battalion was assigned to the 2nd Infantry Division in Germany, and in 1963 reassigned to the 8th Infantry Division. 2–87 Infantry was inactivated in June 1986, only to be reactivated two years later as the sixth battalion of the 10th Mountain Division, Light Infantry, at Fort Drum, New York.

In November 1991, the battalion completed a successful rotation at NTC in conjunction with 3rd Brigade, 24th Mechanized Division and in March 1992 the battalion spent a month at Fort Pickett Virginia conducting MOUT Training. In August 1992 the battalion deployed to Florida as relief for Hurricane Andrew, in support of JTF Operation Hurricane Andrew. They operated from August through October in Homestead Florida, providing food and essential services to local citizens and aiding in cleanup of the city.

In December 1992, 2-87, minus Comanche Company and the Battalion scouts who were detached in support of a JRTC rotation, but with the addition of Alpha Company and scouts from 1-87, deployed to Somalia as part of a Joint Task Force in support of Operation Restore Hope under the command of LTC Jim Sikes. The initial mission was to secure Baledogle airfield and assist Non-government organizations with food distribution. In late December, Apache and Blackhawk Companies conducted an Air Assault to seize Belet Uyene Airfield in order to allow the expansion of the coalition footprint. While Blackhawk Company secured Baledogle airfield, the remainder of the battalion air assaulted into the port of Marka in support of civil agencies' efforts. While in Marka, members of TF 2-87 stood up a local city council, a local police force, distributed food to locals, patrolled the town, manned checkpoints and secured the port. 2-87 was involved in several firefights with local militias and criminal elements. In January 1993 through mid-February, 2-87 was responsible for securing the lower Shabele valley from local militia forces. In late February, the battalion moved to secure the port of Kismayu, and then back to the port of Marka. In April 1993, TF 2-87 was relieved by 1-22 and returned to Fort Drum.

In August 1994 the battalion deployed to Haiti on a four-month rotation in August 1994 as part of Operation Uphold Democracy.

In January 1997, 2–87 deployed with 529 soldiers as a Task Force to Sinai in Egypt for a six-month rotation for the Multinational Force and Observers mission. The Task Force was part of a 14-country peace keeping force sent to the Sinai to enforce the Camp David Peace Accord signed in 1981. During this deployment soldiers from 2-87 participated in the "Force Skills" competition with the team from HHC 2-87 scouts winning "First Place Team" competing against teams from 14 different countries.

In September 1998, elements of the battalion deployed to Central Asia to participate in CENTRAZBAT '98, a multi-national peacekeeping exercise involving soldiers from six former Eastern Bloc nations. During this exercise, 2–87 forged ties with other nations through shared hardships and training, while setting the stage for the multinational operations and peacekeeping missions that would soon follow.

In late August 1999, the soldiers of 2–87 deployed overseas to the nation of Bosnia and Herzegovina in the former Yugoslavia. The battalion would serve as one unit in the Multinational Division (North) component of the Stabilization Force 6, in support of Operation Joint Forge. Task Force CATAMOUNT was charged with the northern portion of the MND (N) sector, including the towns of Brcko, Srebenik, and Modirchia. During the Task Force's seven-month deployment, it participated in several missions designed to bring stability to the Balkans and a lasting peace to the People of Bosnia. Most notably, Operation Harvest which resulted in the destruction of over 5,000 weapons, and the implementation of the Brcko Demilitarization process that disbanded and relocated over 5,000 members of the Entity Armed Forces as well as destroyed 9,000 weapons required by the Brcko Arbitration Decision.

==== Sinai 2001 ====
From July 2001 to January 2002, 2–87 Infantry was again ordered overseas. This time it was a six-month deployment in support of the Multi-National Force and Observers in the Sinai desert. During those six months, the battalion took part in pre-deployment and sustainment training and certification, 24-hour operation of all remote sites and the battalion tactical operations center, training and deployment of the quick reaction force (QRF) and were responsible for security and force protection of South Camp. The battalion also prepared and participated in Force Skills Competition, operational readiness checks and SNAP inspections, EIB, EFMB, marksmanship and live-fire training and testing, joint and combined training with other contingents, and many other tasks, duties, and responsibilities.

==== Afghanistan 2003 ====
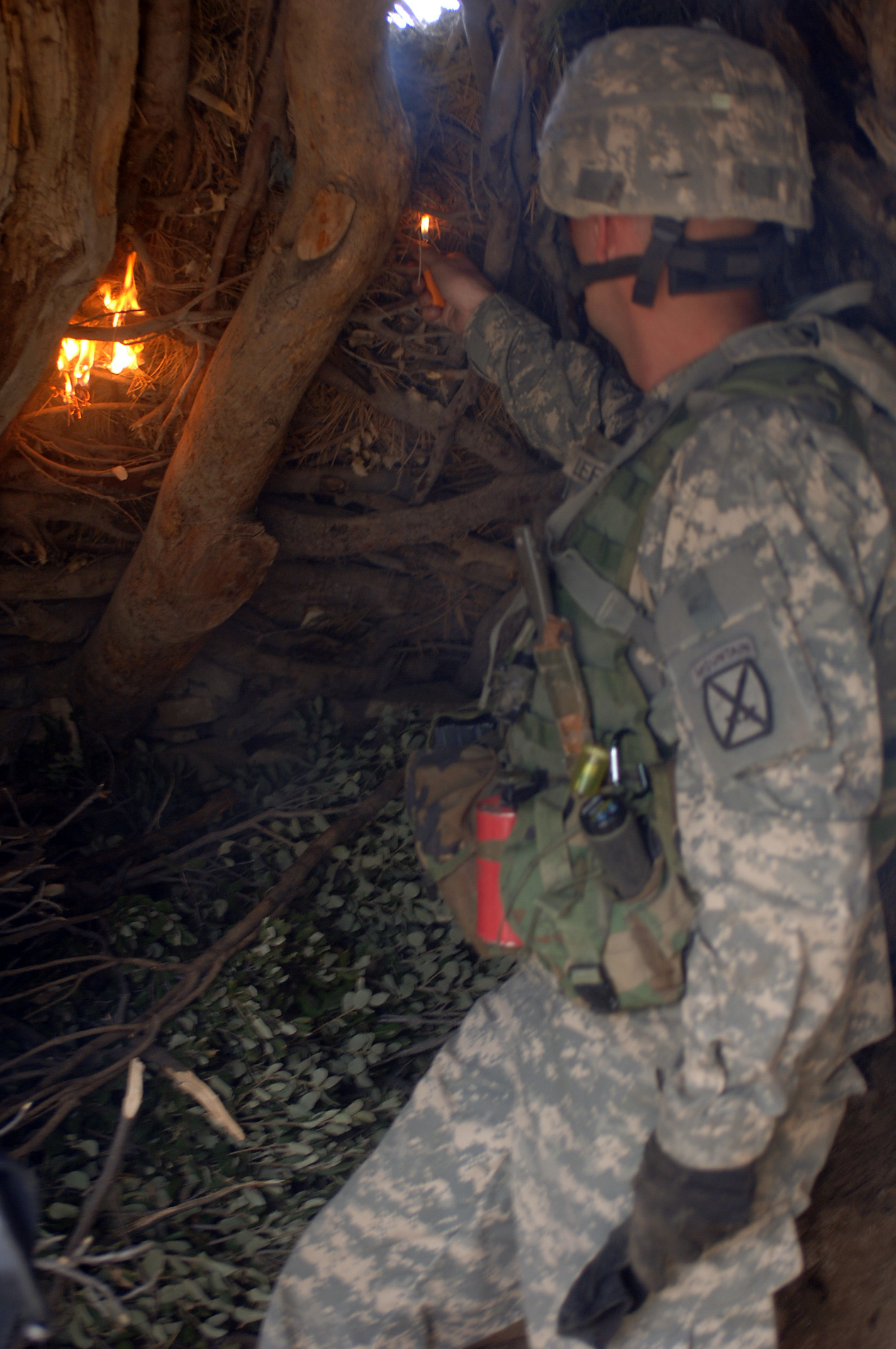
A Soldier from Charlie Company 2nd Battalion, 87th Infantry Regiment sets fire to a Taliban safe house discovered during Operation Catamount Fury, the Paktika Province of Afghanistan

Prior to the 2d Battalion, 87th Infantry Regiment deployment, soldiers were hand-selected to stand up an advanced fighting force with advanced training schools, and skillsets. In August 2003 the battalion deployed with 700 soldiers as a task force to Afghanistan in support of Operation Enduring Freedom IV, for a nine-month rotation. Task Force 2–87 was part of the 2nd Brigade Combat Team, working as the northern combat task force. In Afghanistan, the Catamounts took part in combat operations to defeat anti-coalition forces operating in Asadabad, Barikowt, Khowst, Nangalam, and Ghazni provinces.

After their return from Afghanistan, 2–87 was swept up in the army's transformation initiative, where it added a weapons company, received in direct support a forward support company, and was assigned to the newly activated 3rd BCT (Spartans) of the 10th Mountain Division at Ft. Drum, NY.

==== Afghanistan 2006 ====
During the period 29 January 2006 to 28 May 2007, Under the command of Lieutenant Colonel Christopher Toner 2d Battalion, 87th Infantry Regiment and its subordinate units deployed in support of Operation Enduring Freedom (OEF) VII and VIII. With an initial area of operations 200 km in length and 200 km in width, and over 750 km of shared border with Pakistan, the battalion effectively deterred enemy infiltration from Pakistan and isolated the interior population of Paktika Province from terrorist attacks and influence.

A Co. 2-87 "Scalp 'Em All!" (Apache Company) was deployed to the Paktika Province of Eastern Afghanistan, only a few kilometers from the Pakistan border, in January 2006. Once home to ODA / Special Operations FOB Tillman (named for Ranger Pat Tillman who was killed in the area), and previously named Camp Lwara, they spent 16 months conducting mounted and dismounted, patrols and combat operations in support of Operation Enduring Freedom VII and VIII. Under the decisive leadership of two COs (CPT. Chris Nunn and later CPT. Scott Horrigan) and 1SG Mio Franceschi, the men of Apache Company reinforced and largely rebuilt FOB Tillman and the surrounding Observation Posts 1 and 4, while maintaining a constant patrol schedule between the three line platoons and headquarters platoon. As a testament to the outstanding leadership of Apache 2-87 and the bravery of its warriors, the company did not lose a single soldier in combat during the 16-month tour, though many were injured. On 28 April 2007, SGT. Jeremy Greene fell to a friendly-fire incident at FOB Tillman. He is remembered as an outstanding soldier and a brave warrior.

B Co. 2-87 (Featured in Outlaw Platoon) was deployed throughout RC East with its main body at FOB Bermel, located on the rugged terrain of the Pakistan border. 1st Platoon "Fightin' First" was detached from B Co. and conducted numerous dismounted and air assault operations throughout all of RC East and South from Ghazni to the Korengal.

C Co. 2-87 was based out of FOB Waza Khwa on in the rugged border region of Paktika Province. The company participated in all of the battalions named operation. Most famously the "Comanche" company was selected as the main effort in Operation Medusa. Details of the acts of heroism while being outmanned in the initial clearance of Pajiway can be read in "LIONS of KANDAHAR".

D Co. 2-87 "Destroyer" Company was created in part of the Army's transitioning into Brigade Combat Teams (BCT). The men of Destroyer company were infantry soldiers that had additional Heavy Weapons Platoon training. The men were versed in all light infantry weapon systems and tactics like their rifle company counterparts as well as anti-armor, Javelin and TOW missile systems and the accompanying tactics of maneuvers. Destroyer company would see its four platoons split amongst the region of RC East with men in Paktika, Ghazni, and Paktia provinces. First Platoon would find themselves in numerous major operations in support of Operation Mountain Fury, Operation Mountain Thrust, and Operation Andar Fury. First Platoon "Bandits" were attached to Headquarters and Headquarters Company (HHC) command. Proving to be highly mobile they were frequently utilized in operations throughout RC East, stretching from FOB Waza Khwa in the south to FOB Salerno in the north.

2nd Platoon fell under command of B Co. located at FOB Bermel between the Afghani and Pakistani border. Along with patrols in the heavily wooded and mountainous terrain, they were also tasked with the creation and manning of the Malakshay Combat Outpost. 3rd Platoon "Third Herd" was tasked with security detail for a Civil Affairs unit high in the mountains of Gardez. Lastly 4th platoon remained with Destroyer company's commander based at FOB Orgun-E, where they patrolled the surrounding landscape and assisted with security in providing travel between FOB Bermel and Orgun-E.

TF Catamount was extended in Afghanistan for an additional four months on 27 January 2007 in support of the United States efforts to increase troop numbers in Afghanistan. Many soldiers who had previously returned to their families stateside were to redeploy and continue normal battlespace operations. The battalion returned to the battlefield and continued to conduct combat operations focusing on the Afghan/Pakistan border region. The increased numbers of soldiers within a smaller geographical locale showed to be devastating against the Taliban insurgency. Eventually, TF Catamount would turn over their Area of Operations (AO) and battlespace to units from the 82nd Airborne Division, and 173rd Airborne Division.

Over the course of 16 months, a total of 86 valor awards were awarded to members of TF Catamount, and 137 Purple Hearts were awarded to soldiers for sustaining wounds in the fierce fighting. The regiment facilitated the disruption of Taliban operations alongside multinational forces to oversee the transfer of authority, successfully captured one of the most significant weapons caches in OEF and detained or eradicated several key insurgent commanders. The extraordinary acts of heroism in action against an armed enemy that the men displayed throughout their grueling 16 month-long tour of duty resulted in the unit earning the Valorous Unit Award (VUA), the Battalions first.

* (Additional Overall History provided from 2007 Catamount Yearbook page 7)

==== Afghanistan 2009 ====
In December 2008, under the command of LTC Kimo Gallahue and as part of NATO's International Security Assistance Force, the battalion again deployed to Afghanistan, this time taking control of the embattled Wardak Provence. As part of Task Force Spartan (3rd Brigade Combat Team, 10th Mountain Division (LI), Soldiers of the Catamount Battalion took up positions in the Nherk, Maidan Shar, Saydabad, Jalrez, Jaghatu, Chak, and Tangi Valley districts, with the primary missions of securing Afghanistan's primary highway and establishing positive relationships with the people of Wardak Provence in order to drive the insurgency from the area. They returned to Fort Drum in January 2010 where they were awarded the Valorous Unit Citation.

==== Afghanistan 2011-12 ====
The 2nd Battalion, 87th Infantry Regiment—Task Force Catamount—deployed to Zhari District (The Birthplace of the Taliban), Kandahar Province, Afghanistan in support of Operation Enduring Freedom XI-XII from March 2011 to March 2012. The Battalion, under the command of LTC Gregory K. Anderson and CSM Terry W. Sutton, assumed responsibility for the district from Task Force Talon, 1st Battalion, 502nd Parachute Infantry Regiment of the 2nd Brigade Combat Team, 101st Airborne Division (Air Assault). Apache Company assumed responsibility of the historically prominent village of Senjaray at Combat Outpost (COP) Senjaray. Blackhawk Company assumed responsibility of the rugged, rural village areas of Ashoqueh ("Ash-o-qway") and Makuan ("Maa-Kwan") at COP Ashoqueh and Strongpoint Makuan. Comanche Company assumed responsibility of the complex and urban, rural and desert terrain of the village of Kandalay at COP Kandalay. Destroyer Company assumed responsibility of the urban and mountainous terrain in the villages of Bag-E-Pul, and Now Ruzi at COP Now Ruzi. Headquarters and Fox Support Company operated from Forward Operating Base (FOB) Pasab, with elements also stationed at COP Zhari Dasht (Za-ree-Da'sh-t).

The battalion's counter-insurgency mission was conducted primarily through dismounted, light-infantry patrols; partnered with Afghan National Army soldiers, or Afghan national, or local police. Task Force Catamount executed offensive operations in the Arghandab River Valley, focused in the birthplace of the Taliban. During the year-long deployment, the early spring and summer saw intense combat, centralized in the jungle-like terrain of the "Green Zone," or vegetated portion of the Arghandab River Valley. The battalion conducted over 10 joint air insertion operations, supported a unilateral Afghan Army air assault operation, and deliberate clearance operations of volatile Taliban strongholds throughout the Green Zone. Due to high cover and concealment attributable to the thick vegetation and trench-like grape fields, coupled with multiple Taliban IED cells operating in the area between Ashoqueh and Salim Akah, the Green Zone became one of the most kinetic environments in RC South.

Common Taliban tactics in the area were IED initiated ambushes, followed immediately by suppressive PKM and RPK machine gun fire and 82mm recoil-less rifle volleys. The success of Blackhawk Company progressively clearing each village eastward and confiscation of several 82mm Recoil-less rifles from hidden weapons caches forced the Taliban to adopt new IED placements. These new adaptations were designed to neutralize the successful usage of IED detecting enablers by circumventing the detection capabilities of the devices. Pressure plate IEDs were placed with the plate reinforced under the explosive device instead of above to prevent the detectors from pinpointing the density changes and metal components and wiring in the soil. IEDs were also moved out of the expected kill zone and into the cover and concealment troops would utilize during initial contact.

As the year progressed, successful offensive operations pressured the Taliban to regress south of the Arghandab River, effectively separating them from the local population. This allowed the battalion to train newly recruited Afghan local police, build six new schools and many other new pieces of tactical infrastructure. This facilitated the security of the local population and permitted a new government to take control of their district.

In March 2012, the 1st Battalion, 508th Parachute Infantry Regiment of the 4th Brigade Combat Team, 82nd Airborne Division replaced 2-87 Infantry.

Following the return from OEF XI-XII, the Catamounts conducted reset operations and helped prepare 1st and 2nd BCTs 10th Mountain Division (Light Infantry) prepare for their own deployments. In May 2012, LTC Brian T. Beckno assumed command of the battalion and CSM Brian Hamm assumed responsibility from CSM Sutton.2-87 then began training for another upcoming deployment to include conducting EIB testing, collective training to include team, squad, platoon and company live fires, and finally a JRTC rotation in June 2013. 2-87 was also part of the initial fielding and testing of the Army's newest communication system, Capability Set 13 (CS-13).

==== Afghanistan 2013-14 ====
2-87IN arrived at FOB Shank in November 2013 and conducted a Transition of Authority (TOA) on 19 November 2013, assuming responsibility for Logar Province, a province previously controlled by 4/3IN, a Brigade Combat Team. This marked a significant turning point in the Afghanistan Area of Responsibility as we reduced troop strength throughout the country and the ANSF took on more and more responsibility. Hours after TOA, TF Catamount observed a rocket team firing at FOB Shank and engaged them, killing one insurgent and wounding two others. Upon TOA, Apache Company was responsible for uplift support to Navy Special Operations at District Stability Platform (DSP) Baraki Barak and were partnered with the 4th Kandak, 4th Brigade, 203 Corps, responsible for patrolling Baraki Barak. Blackhawk Company was tasked with conducting patrols west and south of FOB Shank to prevent indirect fire against the FOB and was partnered with the 1st Kandak, 4th Brigade, 203 Corps. Comanche Company was tasked with patrolling within Mohammad Aghah District and was responsible for uplift support to Navy Special Operations at DSP Mohammad Aghah and was partnered with 7th Kandak, 4th Brigade, 203rd Corps. During a reconnaissance patrol with B Co, 6-8 CAV, 1st PLT, Comanche company was conducting a reconnaissance and surveillance patrol within the village of Ahmadzai, Mohammad Aghah District and came under heavy enemy PKM, small arms, RPG, and hand grenade contact. The platoon was able to establish a base of fire and neutralize the enemy team sized element. From this engagement two Comanche Soldiers, received the Army Commendation Medal with V Device for valorous acts during that contact. Fox Company assumed control of sustainment operations on FOB Shank. The Battalion Mortars and Battalion Scouts were co-located at OP English, the last coalition Observation Post in Logar Province. The SECFOR Platoon provided battlefield circulation capability and Guardian Angel support for the SFAAT teams working at Camp Maiwand on FOB Shank and at DSP Pul-e-Alam at the Operational Coordination Center- Provincial (OCC-P).

While the organic elements of 2-87IN were patrolling and assuming force protection responsibilities of OPs and DSPs, the Security Force Advise and Assist Team (SFAAT) began their advisory mission. SFAAT 4 began their advisory efforts at Camp Maiwand, the ANA compound on FOB Shank, as well as at DSP Pul-e-Alam. SFAAT 4 was partnered with the Headquarters of 4th Brigade, 203rd ANA Corps and the OCC-P. Their advising efforts focused on improving the war fighting functions of the ANA with particular emphasis on Mission Command. The SFAAT also provided access to NATO enablers in support of ANSF operations to include air and indirect fire assets.

2-87IN lowered its patrol rate in November and December as it reorganized its troops to tasks. The Infantry companies stopped providing direct advising to their Kandaks as they continued transition to Afghan security primacy. Blackhawk Company assumed control of OP English and made major force protection improvements to the OP. Blackhawk Soldiers emplaced over 500 Hesco barriers around the perimeter and within the ECP, filled and emplaced in excess of 4,000 sandbags, emplaced 2 km of triple strand concertina wire, and rebuilt guard towers, living tents, and the command post. In early January, Comanche Company handed over force protection responsibilities of DSP Mohammad Aghah to elements of Apache and Blackhawk companies and moved back to FOB Shank, with two platoons providing force protection and the third moving to FOB Lighting to provide guardian angel support for the ANA corps advisory team. Once at FOB Shank, Comanche Company emplaced over 10,000 linear feet of Hesco barriers, emplaced over 5,000 meters of obstacles, and searched over 67,000 Local National workers and 25,000 Local National vehicles at the South ECP. 1st Platoon Comanche Company conducted over 1,800 Guardian Angel missions while at FOB Lightning.

February marked the next major task reorganization for 2-87IN. Apache Company turned over DSPs Mohamad Aghah and Baraki Barak to other coalition elements and moved back to FOB Shank. As 1-5 CAV prepared to leave, Comanche Company assumed full responsibility of base defense to include tower guard and both ECPs on FOB Shank while Apache Company assumed responsibility of the Logar Quick Reaction Force and Blackhawk assumed responsibility for the Operational Reaction Force. Apache was given the task of disrupting to the North of FOB Shank, which encompassed the village of PKS. Blackhawk Company retained control of OP English and used it as a platform to patrol nearby areas and was also responsible for the area South of FOB Shank. The Battalion Mortars moved back to FOB Shank and established a new Mortar Firing Point to support ongoing operations. The Battalion Scouts were attached to Apache and Blackhawk elements for patrols of the area around FOB Shank. Fox Company continued their sustainment operations and also provided essential support for retrograde efforts and closing down the north side of FOB Shank.

In late February 2014, TF Catamount conducted Operation Wrecking Ball. This was a combined operation developed by the battalion which included and integrated elements of Apache Company, the BN Scout PLT, Navy Special Operations, ANA, ANCOP, and GIRoA leaders like the Provincial Governor and Provincial Chief of Police in a concerted effort to disrupt the IDF cells operating in PKS whom frequently conducted attacks against FOB Shank. This Operation was unprecedented for its coordination and integration of numerous coalition and ANSF elements and resulted in a marked drop of IDF attacks for a period of 4–5 weeks.

In March 2014, Alpha and Delta companies from 1/504 PIR arrived at FOB Shank and were task organized to Task Force Catamount for Base Defense. 2-87IN prepared for the upcoming Afghan presidential elections by providing support to the ANSF as they conducted security and clearance operations in order to facilitate voting.

Task Force Catamount began April 2014 by aiding the ANSF prior to and during the historic national presidential elections which took place on 5 April 2014. On the day prior to the Afghan national presidential elections enemy forces conducted an attack on OP English in an effort to disrupt the elections. Soldiers from 1st PLT, Blackhawk Company engaged the enemy combatants with direct fire weapons and mortars, killing one enemy and suppressing four more, forcing them to break contact. The following day, enemy combatants again conducted an attack on OP English and a nearby polling site, Blackhawk Company Mortars engaged the enemy team, wounding all three enemy combatants; a later patrol confirmed two of these enemy combatants as KIA. The advisory efforts of the BN's SFAAT team were critical to ensuring the ANSF were capable of properly preparing for the elections and also securing Logar Province, allowing for a historic number of voters being able to cast their votes. After the hard work of the Afghan forces, 68 sites were secured for the duration of the Election Day. The insurgents attempted to disrupt the operation to no avail due to the dedicated ANSF personnel and the assistance from Task Force Catamount. This enabled the GiROA to conduct an election for the next President of Afghanistan, a critical step in maintaining the new government and its constitution.

On 12 April 2014, 1st Platoon Apache Company and a scout section were conducting a counter indirect fire patrol North of FOB Shank. After establishing a dismounted observation post, they began receiving small arms and sniper fire. A sniper from the attached scout section, Spc. Kerry M.G. Danyluk aged 27, was mortally wounded. The platoon on the ground immediately began suppressing the enemy element while simultaneously conducting an aerial MEDEVAC. While 1st Platoon, Apache company was maintaining positive identification of the enemy insurgents, 3rd Apache Company, the Quick Reaction Force, was dispatched to link up with 1st Platoon and reinforce them. After air assets came on station, two Apache Attack Helicopters conducted a gun run on enemy insurgents, killing one who were engaging Apache Company. Apache Company 1st Platoon continued to be engaged by enemy insurgents killing one, and two fire missions were conducted against enemy positions in order to disrupt them. 2nd Platoon, Apache company also left FOB Shank and moved to a position South of the elements in contact to provide support. After over two hours of contact, the insurgents broke contact and the Apache elements moved back to FOB Shank.

In mid-April, TF Catamount received the PDSS from 3rd Cavalry regiment and its 2nd Squadron, beginning efforts to prepare for TF Catamount and TF Spartan's relief. Discussions focused on continuing retrograde and how best to secure U.S. forces upon the arrival of 3rd Cavalry Regiment, with its focus on retrograde rather than advising. Key decisions included the formalization of the TF Shank footprint which encompassed shrinking FOB Shank; 2nd Squadron, 3rd Cavalry Regiment also decided to retain OP English and continue the advising mission with 4th Brigade, 203rd ANA Corps due to its headquarters being co-located with Sabre Squadron at TB Shank.

On 19 April 2014, 3rd Platoon Blackhawk Company, sent a small element to retrieve a downed RQ-11 Raven UAV. Soldiers in this element conducted a clover leaf search within NW of OP English. Insurgent forces struck with an ambush initiating with sniper fire from the North along with PKM Machine Gun fire from the NW. After accurate suppressive fire killed the PKM Machine Gun team 3/B Wolverines broke contact and returned to post at OP English.

In the early morning of 28 April 2014, 3rd Platoon Blackhawk Company was conducting a dismounted nocturnal joint mission with ANSF starting from OP English. Before daybreak 3rd Platoon provided security from a treeline approximately 50 meters from Pata-Khil. ANSF conducted raids and 3/B RP to OP English to pick up the MRAPS and RP to FOB Shank to switch the trucks.

On the Afternoon of 28 April 2014, 1st Platoon Blackhawk Company was conducting a patrol west of FOB Shank across the Little Logar River when it was ambushed by enemy insurgents approximately 100 meters away in the village of Shehk Khel. Two U.S. soldiers were WIA in the initial burst of enemy fire. The Platoon immediately returned fire and submitted a 9 Line aerial medical evacuation request. While the platoon was breaking contact, air assets came on station, the FOB Shank QRF was dispatched and the Platoon's mounted element began moving towards the river to link up with the dismounts. During the Platoon's movement towards the river, a fire mission was fired South of the Village to disrupt enemy forces. The Platoon successfully linked up with its mounted element and its trucks and then moved back to FOB Shank. One of the two wounded soldiers, Spc. Christian J. Chandler aged 20, died upon reaching the medical treatment facility. From this engagement two 1st Platoon Blackhawk Soldiers, received the Bronze Star Medal with V Device for valorous acts during that contact. The surviving WIA was promoted to Corporal upon return.

During late April, TF Catamount also received two platoons from Battle Company, 1-32IN to supplement the force protection at FOB Shank. Battle Company was tasked with manning the towers that were emptied by the departure of the Theater Reaction Force, A/1/504 just prior. Battle Company also assumed responsibility for FOB Shank Operational Reaction Force several weeks later. On 30 April 2014, Huron Company conducted a Change of Command. Apache Company also underwent a change of Command on 15 May. Operations throughout May continued to focus on the enduring threat from enemy indirect fire attacks.

During June 2014, TF Catamount continued operations with intent on protecting the force, enabling retrograde operations and setting conditions for the reception of 2nd Squadron, 3rd Cavalry Regiment. On June 9, 2014, 3rd Platoon Blackhawk Company dispatched multiple enemies after a complex ambush in support of a joint operation with 2nd Platoon "Savages" Blackhawk Company and Special Operational Forces raid in Deh Doshembeh. The battle was filmed for the Docu-series "The Fighting Season." On 14 June, TF Catamount again provided support to the National Afghan Election Runoffs, with great success. TF Catamount conducted multiple strikes against enemy positions enabling the ANSF to conduct security operations and ensure the success of elections in Logar. In late June and into July, TF Catamount conducted a successful Relief in Place with Sabre Squadron at FOB Shank and successfully transitioned back to Fort Drum, NY. Upon its arrival at Fort Drum, 2-87 conducted reintegration training and received fresh leadership. On 25 July 2014, CSM Brian Hamm conducted a change of responsibility with CSM Charles Gilmer Jr. SFC On 12 August 2014, LTC Brian Beckno conducted a change of command with LTC Jonathan Chung.

==== Afghanistan 2016 ====
2nd Battalion, 87th Infantry Regiment, under the command of LTC Jonathan Chung and CSM Stephen Larocque, deployed from Fort Drum, New York to Shorab Annex in Helmand Province, Afghanistan from February 2016 through November 2016.

The estimated 500 Soldiers arrival was the first large scale American military presence in the region since the closure of Camp Leatherneck. The mission of the Task Force was for immediate intervention and influence for ally forces to reestablish the fighting line, regain control of Helmand Province and prevent it from falling into the control of the Taliban.

The unit was immediately attacked with mortar rounds the first night they took over responsibility of the Annex. These mortar attacks continued nightly over the first month until the counter assaults were eventually successful. The unit continued to engage Taliban fighters in cities such as Sangin and Laskar Gah, where A Co. served as the primary assault element; however, in July after A Co. successfully secured the Bost Airport, the Task Force began to lose momentum, and in August, while assisting US Special Forces and Afghan Commandos when two pressure plated IEDs detonated the resulted in a mass casualty event killing and wounding several Afghan Commandos and US Soldiers.

In the wake of the attack, US Command quietly deployed close to 100 Special Force Operators into the region.

Although 2-87 IN had been decimated, the unit continued to provide support until the battered unit returned to Fort Drum, NY in November 2016 with an estimated 300 Soldiers.

Helmand Province would later fall into the Taliban control later in the year, which marked this as one of the key mission failures of the Afghan War.

==== Afghanistan 2018-2019 ====
2nd Battalion, 87th Infantry Regiment, under the command of LTC David Preston and CSM Michael Eiermann, deployed from Fort Drum, New York to Contingency Location (CL) Dwyer in Helmand Province, Afghanistan from 20 October 2018 through 17 July 2019. Assigned to US Forces -Afghanistan (USFOR-A) and under the tactical control of Task Force Southwest in Kandahar Province.

==== TF Catamount Afghanistan 2018-19 ====
2nd Battalion, 87th Infantry Regiment, under the command of LTC David Preston and CSM Michael Eiermann, deployed from Fort Drum, New York to Contingency Location (CL) Dwyer in Helmand Province, Afghanistan from 20 October 2018 through 17 July 2019. Assigned to US Forces -Afghanistan (USFOR-A) and under the tactical control of Task Force Southwest in Kandahar Province, TF Catamount Secured CL Dwyer in support of Operation Freedom’s Sentinel in order to enable strategic, joint and interagency operations, while providing a power projection platform for Coalition Forces into Central/ Southern Helmand Province. The Catamounts patrolling led to a 66% reduction in rocket attacks against CL Dwyer. Additionally the Catamounts patrolling led to the discovery and neutralization of 18 IEDs. In the process of defeating these threats, the Catamounts received 97 Individual Combat Badges, five Purple Hearts, and 28 Bronze Stars. TF Catamount's efforts directly contributed to the success of the RS mission and the Government of the Islamic Republic of Afghanistan (GIRoA), by securing CL Dwyer, and disrupting the Taliban’s ability to move MWE throughout the region.

The TF Catamount Headquarters was responsible for synchronizing the six warfighting functions for the Battalion. The MCP synchronized operations and intelligence assets across multiple echelons. The plans cell ensured that there was continuous presence in the GDA, to include over 450 patrols, and coverage from multiple ISR assets sourced from both CL Dwyer and TF Southwest. The Intelligence section’s collaboration and support with TFSW and NSOCC-A targeting over ten operations, resulted in 31 enemy killed in action, four kinetic strikes, 750 lbs of HME destroyed and ten structures destroyed. Finally, the TFCT Fires Cell coordinated and conducted the firing of over 2,000 munitions and managed airspace control measures for all U.S. and Afghan indirect fires in and around a 900 square kilometer Ground Defense Area (GDA). The Medical Section supported numerous Coalition Force operations, and treated 18 battle casualties from U.S Forces, and Afghan National Defense Security Forces.

Headquarters Company base operations included the management of all life support operations, base structure maintenance, and contractor liaison duties. Working toward enduring quality of life initiatives, the Mayor Cell directly supervised the expansion of the DFAC, relocating the Tactical Communications Facility (TCF), refurbishment of the local national (LN) compound, rebuilding Life Support Area (LSA) 4, and installation of an incinerator for the processing and elimination of waste build up. The Mayor Cell managed over $28 million in contracts, and executed cuts to excess contracts, reducing spending by $2 million annually on the base. HHC oversaw the battalion mortars, and their establishment of two Mortar Firing Points (MFP) on CL Dwyer, extending their range several kilometers to the east.

Apache Company served as the base defense company at Contingency Location Dwyer. As the Battalion’s decisive operation, Apache Company secured over 700 U.S. military personnel and 500 civilians. Apache Company improved the defensive capability of CL Dwyer by laying over 37 km of C-Wire, established thirteen new engagement areas, and restoring two miles of berm with seven foot HESCO barriers. Apache Company also supported the casualty transfer and evacuation of 16 Coalition and ANDSF casualties. The base defense team ensured life-saving care and solidified coalition relations with the 1st BDE 215th ANA Corps. Apache Company deployed new standard operating procedures for base defense. Apache Company and counter UAS systems enabled the deterrence of three UAS incursions.

Comanche Company conducted 235 patrols in the Northern Ground Defense Area, in Garm-Ser District, Helmand Province, Afghanistan. Comanche Company Soldiers assumed duties within the CL including tower guard, ECP/MCP security, local national escort duties, QRF missions, and Guardian Angel support. While patrolling, Comanche Company Soldiers neutralized seven IEDs and struck three, enabling freedom of maneuver throughout the GDA.

Danger Company provided security for Task Force Catamount, Task Force Legion, Task force Panther, and over 500 civilians working on CL Dwyer, through patrolling of the southern GDA. Danger Company conducted over 250 patrols in a 400 square kilometer area of operations. Danger Company integrated collection assets to assist the Task Force in targeting efforts that resulted in over 750 lbs. of HME removed from the battlefield, and several kinetic strikes. Danger Company successfully neutralized eleven IEDs, and striking four, denying the enemy the ability to conduct significant operations within the GDA throughout the deployment.

Iroquois Company simultaneously executed missions at Kandahar Airfield, MSS (Mission Support Site) Tarin Kowt, MSS Shorab, Camp Bost, Camp Jadeed, and Camp Conde. Iroquois Company cross-trained all personnel at various locations allowing for increased mission support. Iroquois elements conducted over 1,500 forward arming and refueling point (FARP) operations at MSS Tarin Kowt and FOB Eagle; distributing over 400,000 gallons of fuel to various coalition and Afghanistan National Army aircraft, resulting in increased coalition reach. Iroquois Company cooked and served over 175,000 hot meals to a combined 700 personnel daily consisting of both coalition forces and civilian contractors at MSS Tarin Kowt, Camp Jadeed, Camp Bost, and Camp Thompson. Iroquois Company supported Train, Advise, Assist Command – South through multiple unit transitions and reliefs.

For their efforts 2nd Battalion 87th Infantry Regiment Headhunter Company, Apache Company, Commanche Company, and Danger Company were awarded the Meritorious Unit Commendation medal.

== Heraldry ==
- See Regimental History for Coat of arms

== Lineage ==
2d Battalion, 87th Infantry Regiment

   Constituted 15 November 1941 in the Army of the United States as Company B, 87th Infantry Mountain Regiment, and activated at Fort Lewis, Washington
   Redesignated 12 May 1942 as Company B, 87th Mountain Infantry
   Reorganized and redesignated 22 February 1944 as Company B, 87th Infantry, an element of the 10th Light Division
   Reorganized and redesignated 6 November 1944 as Company B, 87th Mountain Infantry, an element of the 10th Mountain Division
   Inactivated 21 November 1945 at Camp Carson, Colorado
   Redesignated 18 June 1948 as Company B, 87th Infantry, an element of the 10th Infantry Division
   Allotted 25 June 1948 to the Regular Army
   Activated 1 July 1948 at Fort Riley, Kansas
   Inactivated 1 July 1957 in Germany and relieved from assignment to the 10th Infantry Division; concurrently redesignated as Headquarters and Headquarters Company, 2d Battle Group, 87th Infantry
   Redesignated 25 January 1963 as Headquarters and Headquarters Company, 2d Battalion, 87th Infantry, and assigned to the 2d Infantry Division (organic elements concurrently constituted)
   Battalion activated 15 February 1963 at Fort Benning, Georgia
   Relieved 4 September 1963 from assignment to the 2d Infantry Division and assigned to the 8th Infantry Division
   Inactivated 1 May 1966 in Germany
   Activated 31 August 1973 in Germany
   Inactivated 16 June 1986 in Germany and relieved from assignment to the 8th Infantry Division
   Assigned 2 May 1988 to the 10th Mountain Division and activated at Fort Drum, New York
   Relieved 16 September 2004 from assignment to the 10th Mountain Division and assigned to the 3d Brigade Combat Team, 10th Mountain Division
   Redesignated 1 October 2005 as the 2d Battalion, 87th Infantry Regiment
   Relieved 16 October 2014 from assignment to the 3d Brigade Combat Team, 10th Mountain Division and assigned to the 2d Brigade Combat Team, 10th Mountain Division

Note: The lineage of the present HHC, 2d Battalion, 87th Infantry Regiment goes back to the World War II-era Company B, 87th Mountain Infantry Regiment, which was part of the regiment's 1st Battalion. The lineage of the pre-1957 2d Battalion and the current 2d Battalion are not the same. When infantry battalions and regiments were dissolved in the late 1950s and personnel and equipment were reorganized into battle groups, the lineages of regimental battalions were disbanded and the lineages of the line companies were reorganized as HHCs for battle groups. When the Army reorganized into brigades and battalions in the early 1960s, the battle group HHC lineages were reorganized and redesignated battalion HHCs.

=== Unit Decorations ===
Ribbon	Award	Year	Notes
	Meritorious Unit Commendation (Army)	2003–2004	For service in Afghanistan
	Valorous Unit Award (Army)	2006–2007	For service in Afghanistan
	Valorous Unit Award (Army)	2009–2010	For service in Afghanistan
	Meritorious Unit Commendation (Army)	2013-2014	For service in Afghanistan
	Meritorious Unit Commendation (Army)	2016	For service in Afghanistan
	Meritorious Unit Commendation (Army)	2018-2019	For service in Afghanistan
