= 416th Engineer Command (United States) =

Engineering command within the U.S. Army Reserve Command

416th Theater Engineer Command
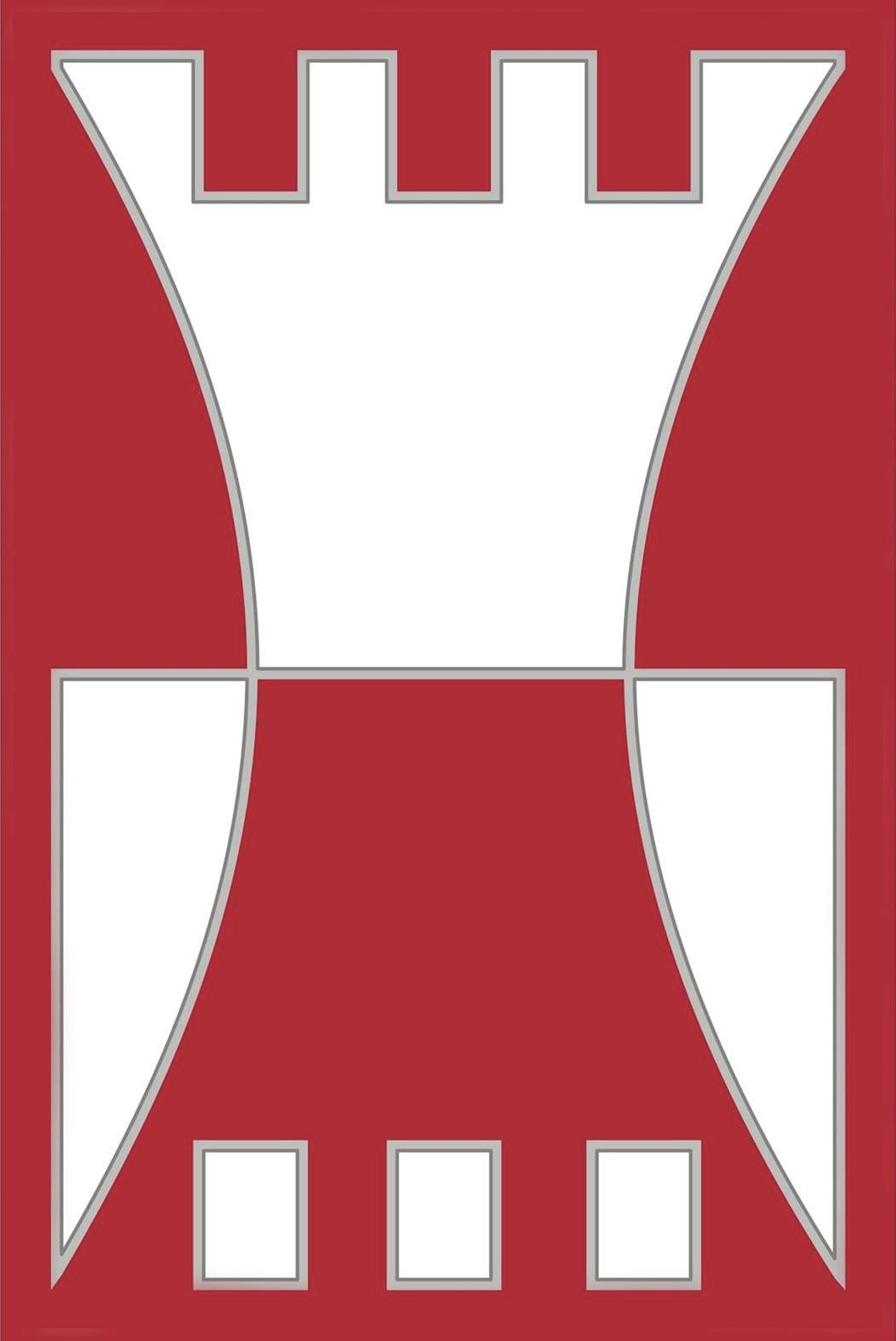
- Shoulder sleeve insignia
- Active: 1950 - present
- Country: United States
- Branch: United States Army Reserve
- Type: Engineering
- Size: Command
- Part of: United States Army Reserve Command
- Reserve Center: Darien, Illinois
- Engineer Corps colors: Scarlet and White

Commanders
- Current commander: Maj. Gen. James J. Kokaska Jr.
- Command Sergeant Major: CSM James Lamberson

Insignia
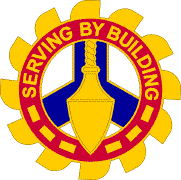
- 416th Engineer Command DUI

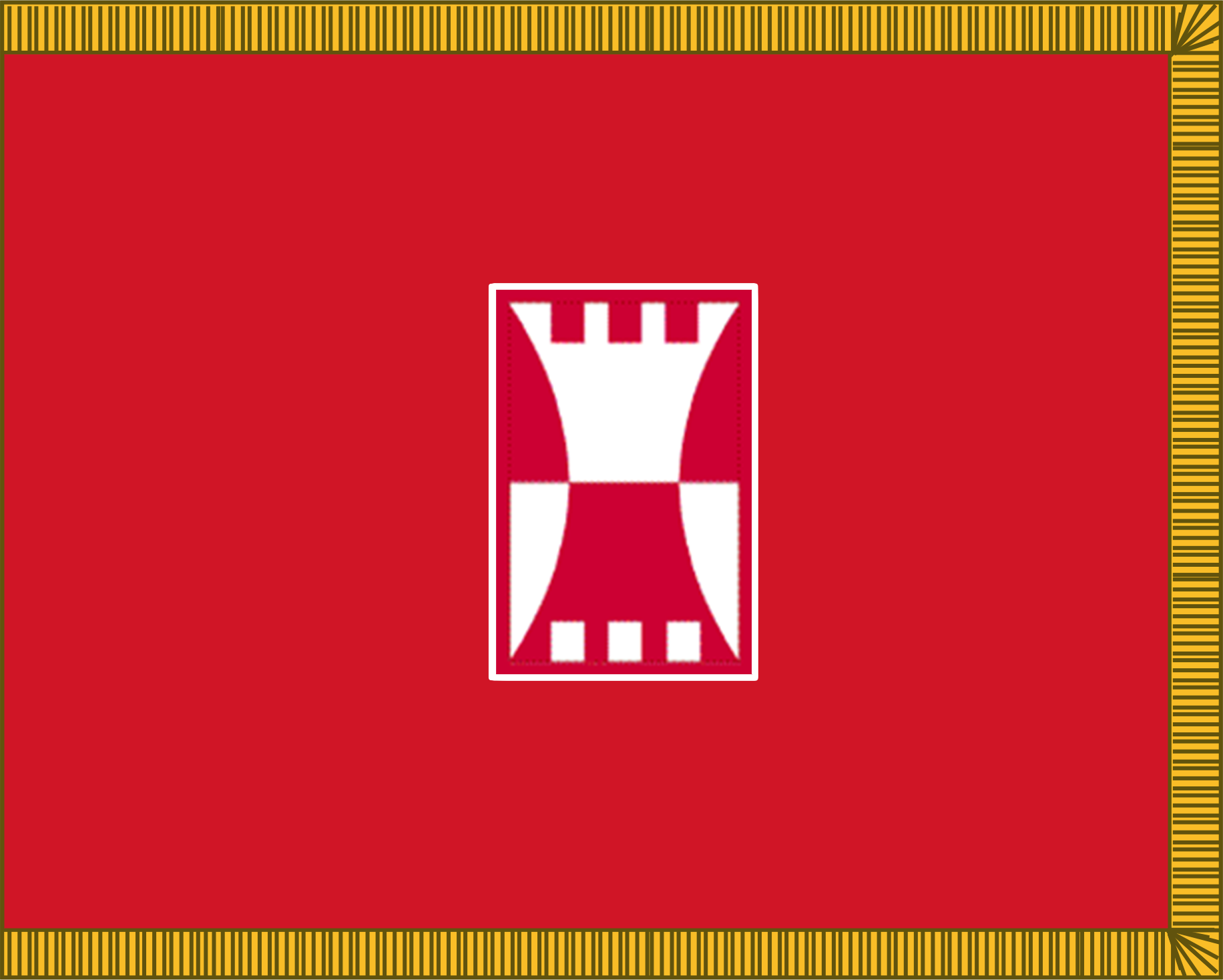
- 416th Engineer Command Flag

The 416th Theater Engineer Command (416 TEC) is a United States Army Reserve command that conducts theater-level engineer operations for US Army Central Command, US Army Southern Command, supports continental U.S. – based engineer requirements as directed, and is prepared to participate in Joint and Combined regional contingency operations. It is also the higher command headquarters for the US Army Facility Engineer Group.

== History ==
The 416th Engineer Command provides theater-level engineer support to the Combatant Commander in the event of a contingency operation. It is designed to command hundreds of engineer units and thousands of Soldiers in a war fighting capacity. The Command has historical training relationships in South and Central America, Southwest Asia, and provides direct support to the US Army Central Command. Until mobilized, the 416th ENCOM is under operational control of the Headquarters, U.S. Army Corps of Engineers.

As an operational command, the 416th has brigades and other assigned units with approximately 10,000 Soldiers located throughout the United States.

The command was formed in 1950, and has served in both Iraq during the Gulf War, and Afghanistan during Operation Enduring Freedom. 416th Soldiers have assisted with construction missions and supported joint exercises in the Honduras and Costa Rica.

The 416th has deployed numerous detachments from the US Army Facility Engineer Group since the beginning of the global war on terror.

== Organization ==
The 416th Theater Engineer Command is a subordinate functional command of the United States Army Reserve Command. As of January 2026, the command is composed of the following units:

- 416th Theater Engineer Command, in Darien (IL)
  - Headquarters and Headquarters Company, 416th Theater Engineer Command, in Darien (IL)
  - United States Army Corps of Engineers Contingency Response Unit, in Washington, D.C.
  - 208th Digital Liaison Detachment (DLD), at Fort Carson (CO)
  - 301st Maneuver Enhancement Brigade, at Joint Base Lewis–McChord (WA)
    - Headquarters and Headquarters Company, 301st Maneuver Enhancement Brigade, at Joint Base Lewis–McChord (WA)
    - 315th Engineer Battalion, at Camp Pendleton (CA)
    - 321st Engineer Battalion, in Boise (ID)
    - 397th Engineer Battalion, in Marina (CA)
  - 372nd Engineer Brigade, at Fort Snelling (MN)
    - Headquarters and Headquarters Company, 372nd Engineer Brigade, at Fort Snelling (MN)
    - 367th Engineer Battalion, in St. Cloud (MN)
    - 863rd Engineer Battalion, in Darien (IL)
    - 983rd Engineer Battalion, in Monclova (OH)
  - 420th Engineer Brigade, in Bryan (TX)
    - Headquarters and Headquarters Company, 420th Engineer Brigade, in Bryan (TX)
    - 489th Engineer Battalion, at Camp Robinson (AR)
    - 961st Engineer Battalion, in Seagoville (TX)
    - 980th Engineer Battalion, in Austin (TX)
  - 647th Regional Support Group, in Wichita (KS)
    - Headquarters and Headquarters Company, 647th Regional Support Group, in Wichita (KS)
    - 244th Engineer Battalion, in Denver (CO)
    - 389th Engineer Battalion, in Dubuque (IA)
  - 301st Engineer Detachment (Forward Engineer Support Team — Main) (FEST-M), in Denver (CO)
    - 213th Engineer Detachment (Engineer Facility Detachment — EFD), at Camp Parks (CA)
    - 308th Engineer Detachment (Engineer Facility Detachment — EFD), in Encino (CA)
    - 348th Engineer Detachment (Forward Engineer Support Team — Advance) (FEST-A), in Houston (TX)
    - 394th Engineer Detachment (Forward Engineer Support Team — Advance) (FEST-A), in Mountain View (CA)
    - 395th Engineer Detachment (Forward Engineer Support Team — Advance) (FEST-A), in Phoenix (AZ)
    - 444th Engineer Detachment (Engineer Facility Detachment — EFD), in Grand Prairie (TX)
    - 606th Engineer Detachment (Engineer Facility Detachment — EFD), in Sloan (NV)
    - 699th Engineer Detachment (Construction Management Team — CMT), at Camp Bullis (TX)
    - 747th Engineer Detachment (Forward Engineer Support Team — Advance) (FEST-A), at Joint Base Lewis–McChord (WA)
    - 802nd Engineer Detachment (Engineer Facility Detachment — EFD), in Denver (CO)
    - 903rd Engineer Detachment (Forward Engineer Support Team — Advance) (FEST-A), at Joint Forces Training Base – Los Alamitos (CA)
    - 917th Engineer Detachment (Engineer Facility Detachment — EFD), at Camp Bullis (TX)
  - 378th Engineer Detachment (Forward Engineer Support Team — Main) (FEST-M), in Darien (IL)
    - 113th Engineer Detachment (Engineer Facility Detachment — EFD), in St. Charles (MO)
    - 322nd Engineer Detachment (Forward Engineer Support Team — Advance) (FEST-A), in Columbus (OH)
    - 377th Engineer Detachment (Forward Engineer Support Team — Advance) (FEST-A), in Milwaukee (WI)
    - 452nd Engineer Detachment (Forward Engineer Support Team — Advance) (FEST-A), in Indianapolis (IN)
    - 457th Engineer Detachment (Forward Engineer Support Team — Advance) (FEST-A), in Livonia (MI)
    - 600th Engineer Detachment (Engineer Facility Detachment — EFD), at Fort Des Moines (IA)
    - 605th Engineer Detachment (Construction Management Team — CMT), in Darien (IL)
    - 728th Engineer Detachment (Construction Management Team — CMT), at Fort Snelling (MN)
    - 733rd Engineer Detachment (Engineer Facility Detachment — EFD), in Kansas City (MO)
    - 871st Engineer Detachment (Engineer Facility Detachment — EFD), at Fort McCoy (WI)
    - 916th Engineer Detachment (Forward Engineer Support Team — Advance) (FEST-A), in Kansas City (MO)
