= Train Advise Assist Command – East =

Train Advise Assist Command – East (TAAC – East)
- Role: Training
- Garrison/HQ: Forward Operating Base Gamberi, Laghman Province
- Website: TAAC – East

Train Advise Assist Command – East (TAAC – East) was a multinational military formation, part of NATO's Resolute Support Mission within Afghanistan. Until 2014 it was designated Regional Command East, part of the International Security Assistance Force (ISAF). The United States Army provided the force headquarters. The command headquarters was located in Laghman Province.

TAAC-East included the provinces of Kapisa, Kunar, Laghman, Nangarhar, Nuristan, Panjshayr and Parwan. It shared a portion of the border with Pakistan.

== History as Regional Command – East ==
Prior to 2014, the formation was known as Regional Command – East (RC–East). In June 2003, the 25th Infantry Division (Light) Division Artillery deployed to Afghanistan to fulfill a unique mission. Division Artillery headquarters would serve as the headquarters of Regional Command East, which was to cover 16 provinces in the east of the country. It was led by the division artillery commander, and comprised the 2nd Battalion, 27th Infantry Regiment (25 ID), 3rd Battalion 3rd Marines, 3rd Battalion, 116th Infantry Regiment (29 ID), three forming Afghan kandaks (battalions), and, eventually, a total of eight Provincial Reconstruction Teams. The formal transfer of authority between 10th Mountain and 25th Infantry took place on 15 April 2004.

Responsibility for Regional Command East originally fell to the 6th Marines. The area of operations included Bamyan, Parwan, Kapisa, Nuristan, Kunar, Laghman, Kabul, Wardak, Logar, Nangarhar, and Ghazni Provinces. The 25th Infantry Division Artillery headquarters, commanded by Col. Gary H. Cheek, took over RC East in June 2004.

=== 2013–2014 ===
The Command was previously responsible for Provincial Reconstruction Team operations and security in and around Asadabad, and Bamyan Province, handled by the New Zealand Provincial Reconstruction Team. The Polish Provincial Reconstruction Team was responsible for operations and security in and around Ghazni Province.

RC East was in August 2013 the host of the Parwan Provincial Reconstruction Team headed by South Korea).

=== Operation Enduring Freedom V – Combined Joint Task Force 76, April 2004 to March 2005 ===
From April 2004 to March 2005, Combined Joint Task Force 76 continued combat and stabilization operations in Afghanistan. CJTF-76 continued Operation Mountain Storm, started in OEF IV. The 25th Infantry Division initiated Operation Lightning Resolve, executed between July and October 2004 to focus upon facilitating and precluding insurgent interference with, the first 2004 Afghan presidential election on 9 October 2004. The National Command Authority alerted 1st Battalion, 505th Parachute Infantry Regiment for an emergency deployment in support of the elections. Operation Lightning Freedom was performed during the winter months to inhibit insurgent operations in remote mountainous areas in eastern and southeastern Afghanistan.

=== Operation Enduring Freedom VI -Combined Joint Task Force 76, March 2005 to February 2006 ===
Command and Control
Southern European Task Force

From March 2005 to February 2006, CJTF-76 supported the continued growth and development of a stable Afghanistan Nation and Government and continued the organization, equipping, arming and training of the Afghan National Army.

Major Combat Operations

As part of CJTF-76, SETAF Soldiers helped to reconstruct and rebuild Afghanistan within their area of operations. SETAF ensured a safe and secure election for the people of Afghanistan as they voted in the 2005 Afghan parliamentary election.

Major units involved:

- Afghan National Army
- 173rd Airborne Brigade Combat Team based in Kandahar Airfield in Regional Command South
- 1st Brigade, 82nd Airborne Division
- 3rd Marine Regiment (United States)
- 6th Marine Regiment (United States)
- 76th Infantry Brigade Combat Team (United States) of the Indiana National Guard (training Afghan National Army)
- Spanish Light Infantry Regiment
- 29th Air Mobile Brigade
- United States and Coalition Special Operations Forces
- United States Air Force
- United States Navy

=== Operation Enduring Freedom VII – Combined Joint Task Force 76, February 2006 to February 2007 ===
Command and Control
10th Mountain Division

From February 2006 to February 2007, CJTF-76 continued security and stabilization operations in Afghanistan to support development of representative Afghanistan government.

Major Combat Operations

In April 2006, CJTF-76 launched Operation Mountain Lion, a search and secure operation performed by the Afghan National Army and 10th Mountain Division in Marawara District of Kunar Province, Afghanistan. During Operation Mountain Lamb, the 10th Mountain Division Civil Affairs operation, assisted humanitarian and educational efforts throughout Afghanistan. Operation Mountain Thrust was a major operation directed against Taliban insurgents in eastern and southeastern Afghanistan from May to August 2006. In September 2006, Afghan and Coalition forces began the maneuver phase of Operation Mountain Fury focusing on defeating Taliban resistance in Ghazni, Khost, Logar, Paktika, and Paktia provinces. Operation Mountain Fury is just one part of a series of coordinated operations placing continuous pressure on Taliban extremists across multiple regions of Afghanistan in order to provide security to the population, extend the government to the people, and to increase reconstruction. In November 2006, CJTF-76 launch Operation Mountain Eagle to defeat enemy forces and link governors of Afghanistan to district level.

Paramount to the success of CJTF-76 during OEF VII was the execution of an aggressive non-lethal effects campaign designed to influence and educate the world, harass the enemy, and win the hearts and minds of Afghanistan's center of gravity – its populace. CJTF-76 leaders spent tireless hours engaging Afghan civic leaders at all levels to ensure that positive messages resonated throughout the Afghan public, as well as in the media. Campaign emphasis included the vital importance of extending government capacity, promoting reconstruction, creating employment opportunities and working to improve Afghan National Security Forces. Noteworthy accomplishments included the construction and improvement of several Provincial Coordination Centers, Provincial Development Councils and District Centers. More than 500 kilometers of roads, schools, clinics and other long lasting projects were built at a cost of just over $90 million using Commander's Emergency Response Program (CERP) funds.

Major Units Involved:

- Afghan National Army
- 3rd Brigade Combat Team, 10th Mountain Division
- 4th Brigade Combat Team, 10th Mountain Division
- 1st Marine Regiment (United States)
- 6th Marine Regiment
- United States and Coalition Special Operations Forces from Australia, Canada, Denmark, Egypt, Estonia, Germany, France, Italy, Korea, Netherlands, New Zealand, Norway, Poland, Romania, United Arab Emirates, and the United Kingdom
- United States Air Force
- United States Navy

=== Operation Enduring Freedom VIII – Combined Joint Task Force 82, February 2007 to April 2008 ===
Command and Control
82nd Airborne Division

From February 2007 to February 2008, CJJTF-82, in conjunction with the Islamic Republic of Afghanistan, join, interagency, and multinational partners, conducted full spectrum operations to disrupt insurgent forces in the combined joint operations area, develop Afghanistan national security capability and supports the growth of governance and development in order to build a stable Afghanistan.

Major Combat Operations

In February 2007, units from the 82nd Airborne Division and the 10th Mountain Division conducted Operation Oqab Hamkary (Eagle Teamwork) in conjunction operations with Afghan forces to expand the influence of the Government of the Islamic Republic of Afghanistan in Ghazni and Paktika Provinces. CJTF-82 operations included lethal and non-lethal missions. Operations Furious Pursuit, Finite Pursuit, and Kulang Hellion were conducted by 1st Battalion, 508th Parachute Infantry Regiment focused coalition forces in the Helmand Province. Operation Maiwand (see Human Terrain System) brought coalitions forces with the 203rd Corps (Afghanistan) to perform Counter-insurgency operations in Ghazni province. Operation Deh Yak focused efforts in Ghazni towards the refurbishment of local schools, medical supply support and several other civic actions. During Operation Kyber, Task Force Fury (1st Battalion, 508th Prachute Infantry Regiment) fell under the operational control of the 203rd ANA Corps in a large scale sweep of Paktya Province. This shaped operations such as Operation Big Axe conducted by Task Force Spartan (3rd Brigade, 10th Mountain Division) and Operation Rock Avalanche conducted by Task Force Rock (503rd Infantry Regiment, 173rd Airborne Brigade Combat Team kept the enemy off balance and set the stage for follow on operations.

CJTF-82 conducted over 325 conventional operations. The statistics do not state the countless Key Leader Engagements, Shura's and other interactions with the Afghan population that soldiers of CJTF-82 performed. Their ability to successfully carry the fight to the enemy while simultaneously building trust with the local population and overseeing non-conventional missions that has allowed the government of Afghanistan and its security forces the opportunity to develop its influence and capabilities.

Major Units Involved:

- Afghan National Army
- 4th Brigade Combat Team, 82nd Airborne Division
- 3rd Brigade Combat Team, 10th Mountain Division
- 173rd Airborne Brigade Combat Team
- 82nd Aviation Brigade
- Polish Battle Group
- US and Coalition Special Forces from Australia, Poland, Canada, Romania, and the United Kingdom
- Coalition Forces from Korea, New Zealand, Egypt, Turkey, France, Italy, Netherlands, and Germany
- United States Air Force
- United States Navy

=== Operation Enduring Freedom IX – Combined Joint Task Force 101, April 2008 to June 2009 ===
Command and Control
101st Airborne Division

From April 2008 to June 2009, in direct support of the Government of the Islamic Republic of Afghanistan (GIRoA), the 101st Airborne Division, North Atlantic Treaty Organization (NATO), International Security Assistance Force (ISAF), Interagency Partners, and CJTF-101/Regional Command East Forces conducted full-spectrum Counter-Insurgency (COIN) operations to develop Afghan National capabilities. In joint cooperation, these Coalition Forces achieved unprecedented success as they worked together to secure the citizenry (Security), exercise capable governance (Governance), and develop a sustainable economy (Development), while defeating terrorists and insurgents, in order to extend (GIRoA) authority and influence as the legitimate government of the Afghan people.

Major Combat Operations

Joint, Coalition, and Alliance Forces made significant advances on numerous fronts to include historic trilateral cooperation between US, Pakistan, and Afghan Forces that enabled significant operations focused upon border development. COIN capabilities in RC-E were enhanced through an increase in Forces with the Polish Battle Group assumption of battle control of Task Force White Eagle and the introduction of the US 3rd Brigade Combat Team, 10th Mountain Division as Task Force Spartan. A singularly significant operation with long-term strategic implications saw Joint, Coalition, and Alliance Forces join to provide effective, comprehensive security across Afghanistan, ensuring successful voter registration to set conditions for the 2009 Afghan presidential election. In the largest transformational initiative in the history of OEF, CJTF-101 planned, coordinated, and initiated support preparations for the introduction of over 21,000 US Troops into Regional Command South. Simultaneously, the CJTF-101 staff planned, coordinated, and executed the transfer of U.S. National Command, National Support, and Title X responsibilities to the newly formed United States Forces – Afghanistan Headquarters in Kabul. CJTF-101 conducted over 490 conventional operations during OEF XI.

Major Units Involved:

- Afghan National Army
- Afghan National Police
- Special Troops Battalion, 3rd Brigade Combat Team, 101st Airborne Division (United States)
- Task Force White Eagle
- 455th Air Expeditionary Wing
- 173rd Airborne Brigade Combat Team
- 4th Brigade Combat Team, 101st Airborne Division
- 101st Combat Aviation Brigade
- 159th Combat Aviation Brigade
- 10th Combat Aviation Brigade
- 3rd Brigade Combat Team, 1st Infantry Division (United States)
- 3rd Brigade Combat Team, 10th Mountain Division
- 1st Maneuver Enhancement Brigade
- 420th Engineer Brigade (United States)
- 168th Engineer Brigade (United States)
- 101st Sustainment Brigade (United States)
- 45th Sustainment Brigade
- 218th Maneuver Enhancement Brigade (United States)
- 27th Infantry Brigade Combat Team (United States)
- 2nd Battalion 7th Marines
- 3rd Battalion 8th Marines
- 24th Marine Expeditionary Unit
- United States Navy
- United States Marine Corps
- United States Air Force
- Units from France, Egypt, Jordan, Singapore, Korea, Czech Republic, New Zealand, Turkey, Australia, Canada, Norway, Poland, Romania, Lithuania, Netherlands, and the United Kingdom.

=== Operation Enduring Freedom X – Combined Joint Task Force 82, 15 May 2009 to May 2010 ===
Command and Control
82nd Airborne Division

In late fall 2008, the 82nd Airborne Division received order from United States Army Forces Command(FORSCOM) to prepare for deployment in support of Operation Enduring Freedom (OEF). Their mission called for Regional Command East, in close coordination with the Government of the Islamic Republic of Afghanistan (GIRoA), joint, interagency, and multinational partners, to conduct counter-insurgency (COIN) operations from April to October 2009, in order to improve GIRoA's capacity to provide security, exercise good governance, develop a sustainable licit economy, and improve the quality of life for the Afghan people.

Major Combat Operations

CJTF-82's mission was to support the GIRoA in rebuilding the country's social institutions including governance, security, economics, and infrastructure while defeating an insurgency committed to hindering regional stability. With more the 24,600 servicemen and woman assigned and attached throughout the deployment, CJTF-82 personnel provided critical mission support for filed forces that include: 3 infantry brigade combat teams, a combat aviation brigade, on Polish Brigade, a Maneuver Enhancement Brigade, a Military Police Brigade, an Engineer Brigade Headquarters, 12 Provincial Reconstruction Team's, and six Agriculture Development Teams operating in an area of 31,000 square miles, of which over 90% is not accessible by vehicle. CJTF-82 partnered with NATO and ISAF from over 30 countries, fielding forces that implement the 'hands-on' actions to develop a stable and secure environment for ordinary Afghan citizens to prosper economically and improve quality of life.

Major Units Involved:

- Afghan National Army
- 82nd Airborne Division
- Combat Aviation Brigade, 3rd Infantry Division (United States)
- 48th Infantry Brigade Combat Team (United States)
- 4th Infantry Division (United States)
  - 2nd brigade, 4th Infantry Division
- 173rd Airborne Brigade Combat Team (United States)

=== Operation Enduring Freedom XI – Combined Joint Task Force 101, June 2010 to May 2011 ===
Command and Control
101st Airborne Division

From June 2010 to May 2011, CJTF-101, in support of the Government of the Islamic Republic of Afghanistan (GIRoA), NATO, ISAF, and other joint interagency, and multinational organizations, conduction population-centric, comprehensive counterinsurgency operations focused on key terrain to neutralize the insurgency, increase the competency and credibility of Afghan institutions, and facilitate development to set the security and stability conditions to begin transition to GIRoA.

Major Combat Operations

During OEF XI, CJTF-101 countered the insurgency along major transportation and economic corridors. These efforts provided freedom of movement to key road networks and set the conditions for enhanced economic development. The task force also assisted several provinces with transition to full GIRoA governance. CJTF-101 conducted more than 770 named operations. The task force, in cooperation with its Afghan and Pakistan partners, provided development and security to the Afghan-Pakistani border. Further, CJTF-101 worked with the Afghan National Army, the Afghan National Police, and other Afghan Security Forces to enhance the safety and security in and around Kabul. The task forced helped GIRoA set the conditions for successful 2010 Afghan parliamentary election, even while assisting its Pakistan neighbors with the disastrous 2010 Pakistan floods. Midway through its campaign, CJTF-101 welcomed an additional brigade into its ranks. This increased combat power and enabled the task force to intensify counterinsurgency and nation-building operations, thus ensuring successful winter and spring campaigns. Thanks to the efforts of the men and women in CJTF-101, the task force had an overwhelmingly successful year.

Major Units Involved:

- Afghan National Army
- Afghan National Police
- Headquarters and Headquarters Battalion, 101st Airborne Division
- 1st Brigade Combat Team, 101st Airborne Division (United States), 101st Airborne Division
- 3rd Brigade Combat Team, 101st Airborne Division
- 4th Brigade Combat Team, 10th Mountain Division
- 2nd Infantry Brigade Combat Team, 34th Infantry Division
- 3rd Brigade Combat Team, 1st Infantry Division (United States)
- 3rd Brigade Combat Team, 25th Infantry Division (United States)
- 86th Infantry Brigade Combat Team (National Guard)
- 173rd Airborne Brigade Combat Team
- 372nd Engineer Brigade (United States)
- 176th Engineer Brigade, Texas Army National Guard
- Combat Aviation Brigade, 3rd Infantry Division (United States)
- Task Force White Eagle
- 6th Light Armoured Brigade (France)
- Coalition Forces from Egypt, Jordan, Singapore, Korea, the Czech Republic, New Zealand, Turkey, Australia, Canada, Norway, Poland, Mongolia, Romania, Lithuania, Netherlands, and the United Kingdom
- United States Air Force
- United States Navy
- United States Marine Corps

=== Operation Enduring Freedom XII – Combined Joint Task Force 1, May 2011 to April 2012 ===
Command and Control
1st Cavalry Division (United States)

From May 2011 to April 2012, CJTF-1, in full partnership with GIRoA, joint, interagency and multinational organizations secured the population through combined action which neutralized insurgent elements, increased Afghan National Security Forces (ANSF) capability and grew the sub-national governance capacity and credibility in key terrain districts. CJTF-1 neutralized criminal patronage networks which increased stability and security by extending GIRoA influence through credible and transparent sub-national governance, ANSF assumption of security primacy, and improved quality of life for the Afghan people. CJTF-1 total more than 30,000 personnel with an operational area of 124,675 square kilometers.

Major Combat Operations

During OEF XII, CJTF-1 expanded and retained security in Regional Command East through its continual support in the development and growth of the ANSF from local villages to the Provincial level and by neutralizing and degrading the insurgent networks along major transportation and economic corridors and at key border crossings. CJTF-1 and its Coalition partners provided freedom of movement to key road networks, protected the population and set the conditions for enhanced economic development.

CJTF-1 conducted more than 2,500 Contingency Operations and six major named operations. The task force worked throughout the winter to build FOBs and source over 15,000 pieces of equipment throughout RC-East to add a brigade combat team and expand security south of Kabul. Through effective partnering and training from CJTF-1 units, the ANSF planned and let many missions and took the security lead April 1, 2012. This set conditions for almost half the districts in RC-East to be in transition.

Major Units Involved:

- Afghan National Army
- Afghan Border Police
- Afghan National Police
- Headquarters and Headquarters Battalion, 1st Cavalry Division (United States)
- 3rd Infantry Brigade Combat Team, 1st Armored Division (United States)
- 3rd Brigade Combat Team, 1st Infantry Division (United States)
- 4th Infantry Brigade Combat Team, 4th Infantry Division (United States)
- 4th Brigade Combat Team, 10th Mountain Division
- 10th Combat Aviation Brigade (United States)
- 3rd Brigade Combat Team, 25th Infantry Division
- 4th Brigade Combat Team (Airborne), 25th Infantry Division
- 2nd Infantry Brigade Combat Team, 34th Infantry Division
- 1st Brigade Combat Team, 82nd Airborne Division
- 82nd Aviation Regiment
- 4th Brigade Combat Team, 101st Airborne Division
- 101st Sustainment Brigade (United States)
- 45th Infantry Brigade Combat Team (United States)
- 172nd Infantry Brigade (United States)
- Task Force White Eagle
- 6th Light Armoured Brigade (France)
- Coalition forces from Egypt, Jordan, Singapore, Korea, the Czech Republic, New Zealand, Turkey, Australia, Canada, Norway, Poland, Mongolia, Romania, Lithuania, Netherlands, and the United Kingdom
- United States Air Force
- United States Navy
- United States Marine Corps

=== Operation Enduring Freedom XIII – Combined Joint Task Force 1, April 2012 to March 2013 ===
Command and Control
1st Infantry Division (United States)

From April 2012 to May 2013, in direct support of GIRoA, the 1st Infantry Division and CJTF-1 forces conducted full-spectrum Counter-Insurgency Operations, later transitioning to Advise and Assist Operations, to develop the Afghan national capabilities, and increase stability and security. Together, the Afghan National Security Forces (ANSF) and Coalition Forces achieved unprecedented success as they worked to secure the population, expand and exercise governance, and develop a sustainable economy. The ANSF increased capability to a record level, defeating terrorist and insurgents while building a capable government of the Afghan people.

Major Combat Operations

During OEF XIII, CJTF-1 and the ANSF, expanded the security in Regional Command East through joint cooperation, continually expanding infrastructure, developing transportation and economic corridors through freedom of movement, and expanding the development and capabilities of the Afghan National Army, Afghan Local Police, Afghan National Police, Afghan Uniform Police, and Afghan Border Police. Significant contributions from Female Engagement Teams, Security Force Advise and Assist Teams, and Provincial Reconstruction Teams greatly enhanced local Afghan communities through joint cooperation with GIRoA.

CJTF-1, while continuing to advise and assist the ANSF, closed, or transferred to ANSF, 60 FOBs, reduced Coalition Forces from 28,500 to 21,800, and initiated a retrograde effort supporting the transition of full security to the ANSF and the Afghan people.

Major Units Involved:

- Afghan National Army
- Afghan Border Police
- Afghan National Police
- Headquarters and Headquarters Battalion, 1st Infantry Division (United States)
- 201st Corps (Afghanistan)
- 203rd Corps (Afghanistan)
- 455th Air Expeditionary Wing
- Task Force White Eagle
- 6th Light Armoured Brigade (France)
- 173rd Airborne Brigade Combat Team
- 172nd Heavy Brigade Combat Team
- 4th Infantry Brigade Combat Team, 1st Infantry Division (United States)
- 4th Infantry Brigade Combat Team (Mountain Warriors), 4th Infantry Division (United States)
- 1st Brigade Combat Team, 101st Airborne Division
- 3rd Brigade Combat Team, 101st Airborne Division
- 1st Brigade Combat Team, 10th Mountain Division (United States)
- 2nd Brigade Combat Team, 10th Mountain Division (United States)
- 4th Brigade Combat Team, 1st Cavalry Division (United States)
- 3rd Brigade Combat Team, 1st Armored Division (United States)
- 4th Brigade Combat Team (Airborne), 25th Infantry Division
- 101st Combat Aviation Brigade
- 82nd Combat Aviation Brigade, 82nd Airborne Division
- 555th Engineer Brigade (United States)
- 1st Sustainment Brigade, 1st Infantry Division (United States)
- 10th Sustainment Brigade
- Combined Joint Task Force Paladin
- Other nations including Jordan, Korea, the Czech Republic, Australia, Canada, New Zealand, the United Kingdom, Poland, Ukraine, Malaysia, France, and Australia.

=== Operation Enduring Freedom XIV – Combined Joint Task Force 101, March 2013 to February 2014 ===
Command and Control
101st Airborne Division

From March 2013 to February 2014, CJTF-101 operated in RC–East.

Major Combat Operations

The transfer of authority from CJTF-1 to CJTF-101 corresponded to International Joint Command's transition away from "Shana-Ba-Shana" or "Shoulder-to-Shoulder" to an advise and assist role. CJTF-101 sought to ensure AQ was not operationally effective in Regional Command East, while overseeing the transfer or closure of tactical infrastructure, and helping further develop the ANSF-PAK relationship along the Regional Command East border. CJTF-101 set attempted to set conditions for the 2014 Afghan presidential election.

Major Units Involved:

- Afghan National Army
- Afghan Border Police
- Afghan National Police
- Headquarters and Headquarters Battalion, 101st Airborne Division
- 201st Corps (Afghanistan)
- 203rd Corps (Afghanistan)
- 455th Air Expeditionary Wing
- Task Force White Eagle
- 1st Brigade Combat Team, 101st Airborne Division
- 3rd Brigade Combat Team, 101st Airborne Division
- 2nd Brigade Combat Team, 1st Cavalry Division (United States)
- 4th Brigade Combat Team, 1st Cavalry Division (United States)
- 1st Brigade Combat Team, 10th Mountain Division (United States)
- 2nd Brigade Combat Team, 10th Mountain Division (United States)
- 3rd Brigade Combat Team, 10th Mountain Division (United States)
- 4th Brigade Combat Team, 10th Mountain Division
- Task Force White Eagle
- 101st Combat Aviation Brigade
- 10th Combat Aviation Brigade (United States)
- 159th Combat Aviation Brigade
- 101st Sustainment Brigade (United States)
- Task Force Paladin
- United States Army Special Operations Task Forces
- 319th Military Intelligence Battalion (BFSB)
- 303rd Military Intelligence Battalion
- 793rd Military Police Battalion
- Other nations including Jordan, Korea, the Czech Republic, Australia, Canada, New Zealand, the United Kingston, Poland, Ukraine, Malaysia, France, and Australia.
- United States Navy
- United States Marine Corps

=== From February 2014 ===
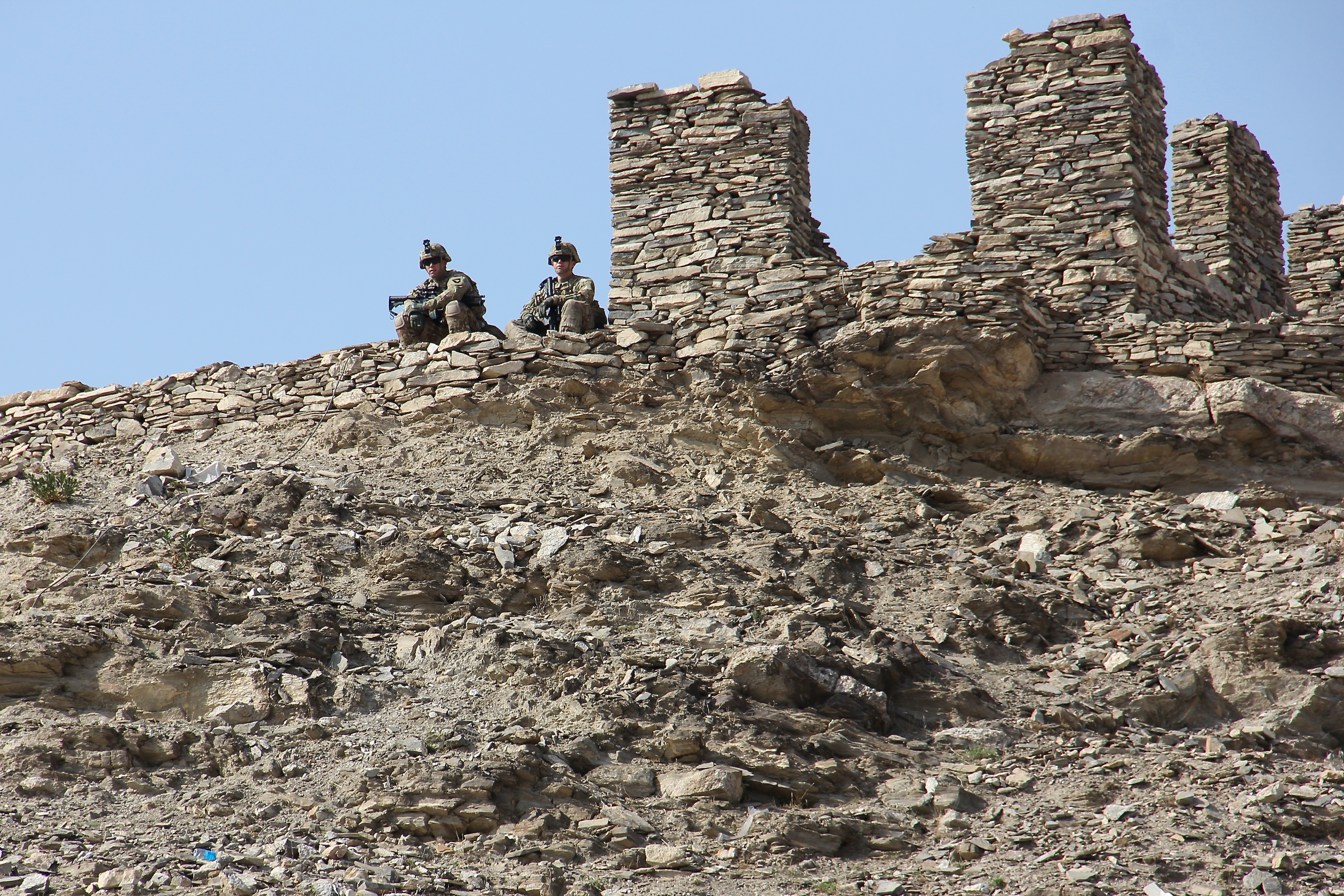
3rd Brigade Combat Team, 101st Airborne Division soldiers serving as TAAC-E advisers at an observation post in Nangahar, February 17, 2015

In January 2014, the Combined Joint Task Force consisted of 8 coalition bases and 5 assistance platforms. The units assigned to the command were two U.S. Security Force Assistance Brigades, one U.S. Combat Aviation Brigade, one Polish Armored Cavalry Brigade and the Korean Provincial Reconstruction Team. The Coalition Forces that operate within RC-East were from Poland, South Korea, Czech Republic, Jordan, Ukraine, Canada, Australia and the United Kingdom.

Combined Joint Task Force – 10 was the operational headquarters. CJTF-10 was commanded by Maj. Gen. Stephen J. Townsend of the 10th Mountain Division (Light Infantry), based at Fort Drum, New York. Karen Decker was the Senior Civilian Representative for CJTF-10, serving as the U.S. Government's lead proponent for sub-national governance, stabilization and civilian-military integration at the regional level.

CJTF 10 inactivated and held an end of mission ceremony for Regional Command East on November 4, 2014.

== As Train Advise Assist Command – East ==
TAAC–East was aligned with the Afghan National Army 201st Corps and the Afghan National Police 202nd Zone.
