= 647th Regional Support Group =

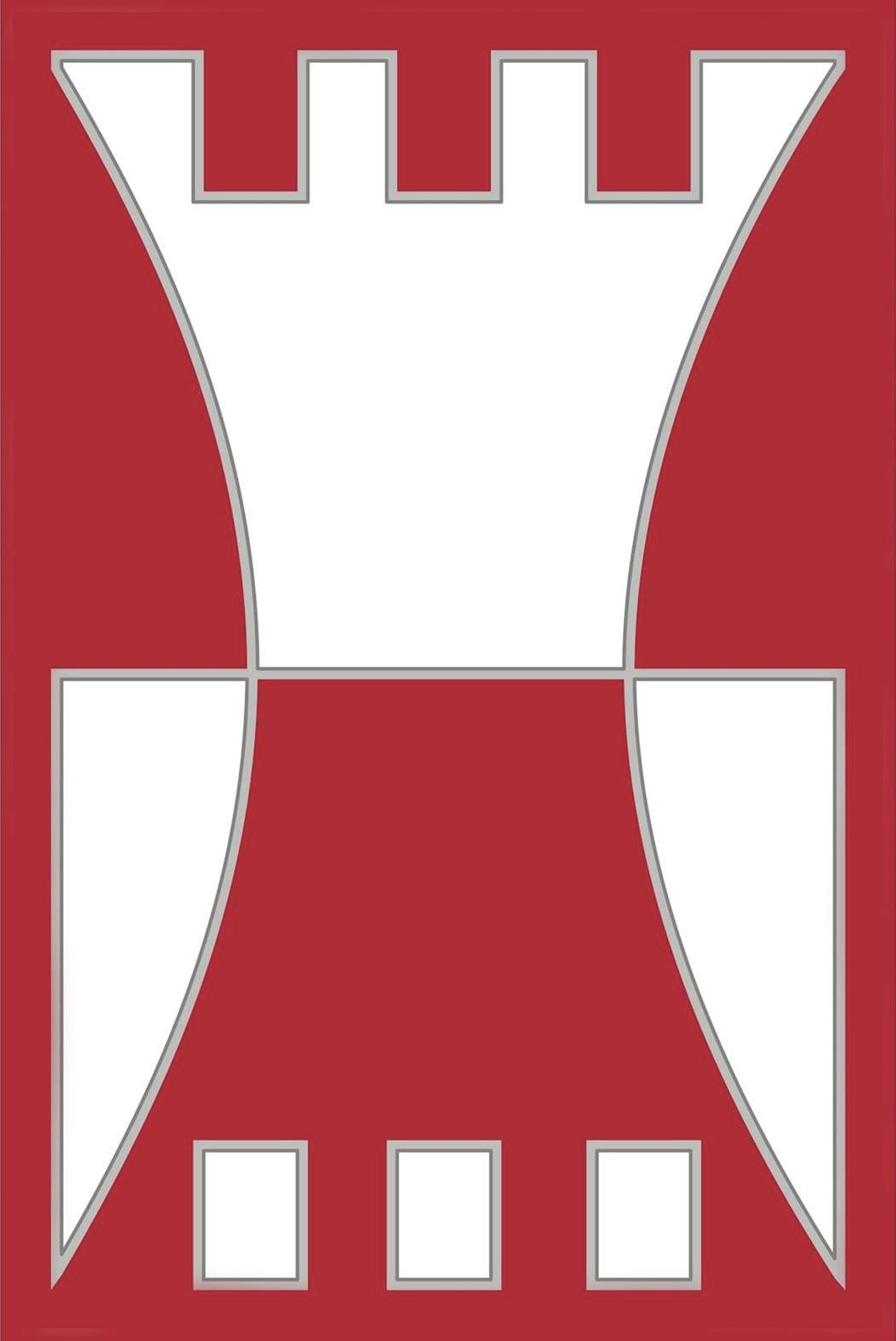
- Group insignia
- Active: 2019-
- Country: United States
- Branch: United States Army Reserve
- Size: Brigade
- Part of: 416th Theater Engineer Command
- Headquarters: Wichita, Kansas

647th Regional Support Group is a United States Army Reserve unit based in Wichita, Kansas. The unit mission is to Deploy to provide contingency and expeditionary base operations support, with responsibilities for managing facilities, providing administrative and logistical support of Soldier services, and ensuring the security of personnel and facilities on a base camp. The RSG provides mission command of assigned units during peace time, homeland security, homeland defense, and civil support missions within the United States, to include managing the reception, staging, onward movement, and integration of supporting forces.

== Organization ==
The group is a subordinate unit of the 416th Theater Engineer Command. As of January 2026 the group consists of the following units:

- 647th Regional Support Group, in Wichita (KS)
  - Headquarters and Headquarters Company, 647th Regional Support Group, in Wichita (KS)
  - 244th Engineer Battalion, in Denver (CO)
    - Headquarters and Headquarters Company, 244th Engineer Battalion, in Denver (CO)
    - Forward Support Company, 244th Engineer Battalion, in Denver (CO)
    - 282nd Engineer Company (Engineer Construction Company — ECC), at Fort Carson (CO)
    - 333rd Engineer Detachment (Utilities), in Santa Fe (NM)
    - 364th Engineer Company (Sapper), in Dodge City (KS)
    - 409th Engineer Company (Vertical Construction Company — VCC), in Windsor (CO)
    - 994th Engineer Company (Vertical Construction Company — VCC), in Denver (CO)
    - 323rd Engineer Detachment (Fire Fighting Team — HQ), in Hutchinson (KS)
    - 340th Engineer Detachment (Fire Fighting Team — Fire Truck), in Hutchinson (KS)
    - 359th Engineer Detachment (Fire Fighting Team — Fire Truck), in Hutchinson (KS)
    - 370th Engineer Detachment (Fire Fighting Team — Fire Truck), in Hutchinson (KS)
    - 406th Engineer Detachment (Fire Fighting Team — Fire Truck), in Hutchinson (KS)
    - 723rd Engineer Detachment (Fire Fighting Team — Fire Truck), in Hutchinson (KS)
  - 389th Engineer Battalion, in Dubuque (IA)
    - Headquarters and Headquarters Company, 389th Engineer Battalion, in Dubuque (IA)
    - Forward Support Company, 389th Engineer Battalion, in Dubuque (IA)
    - 389th Engineer Company (Vertical Construction Company — VCC), in Des Moines (IA)
      - 1st Platoon, 389th Engineer Company (Vertical Construction Company — VCC), in Davenport (IA)
      - 2nd Platoon, 389th Engineer Company (Vertical Construction Company — VCC), in Muscatine (IA)
    - 402nd Engineer Company (Sapper), at Fort Des Moines (IA)
    - 411th Engineer Company (Engineer Construction Company — ECC), in Cedar Rapids (IA)
    - 294th Engineer Detachment (Fire Fighting Team — Fire Truck), at Fort Des Moines (IA)
    - 398th Engineer Detachment (Fire Fighting Team — Fire Truck), at Fort Des Moines (IA)
    - 414th Engineer Detachment (Fire Fighting Team — Fire Truck), at Fort Des Moines (IA)
    - 467th Engineer Detachment (Fire Fighting Team — HQ), at Fort Des Moines (IA)
    - 487th Engineer Detachment (Fire Fighting Team — Fire Truck), at Fort Des Moines (IA)
    - 516th Engineer Detachment (Fire Fighting Team — Fire Truck), at Fort Des Moines (IA)
