= 301st Maneuver Enhancement Brigade =

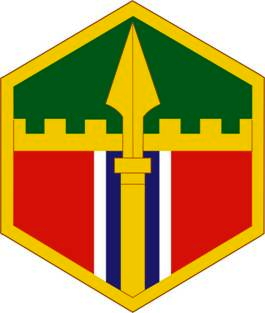
- Brigade Shoulder Sleeve Insignia. Representation: As the unit was formed in the Pacific Northwest, the blue indicates the Columbia River. The shape of the insignia is that of a benzine ring, and a castle wall and pike are within the shape. The red and green colors, together with the shape, are in illustration of Army branches.
- Active: 2008-
- Country: United States
- Branch: United States Army Reserve
- Role: Maneuver Enhancement
- Size: Brigade
- Part of: 416th Theater Engineer Command
- Headquarters: Joint Base Lewis-McChord, Washington

Commanders
- Current commander: COL Tito Pope

Insignia
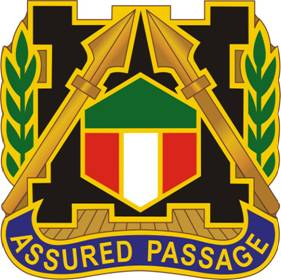
- 301st MEB DUI

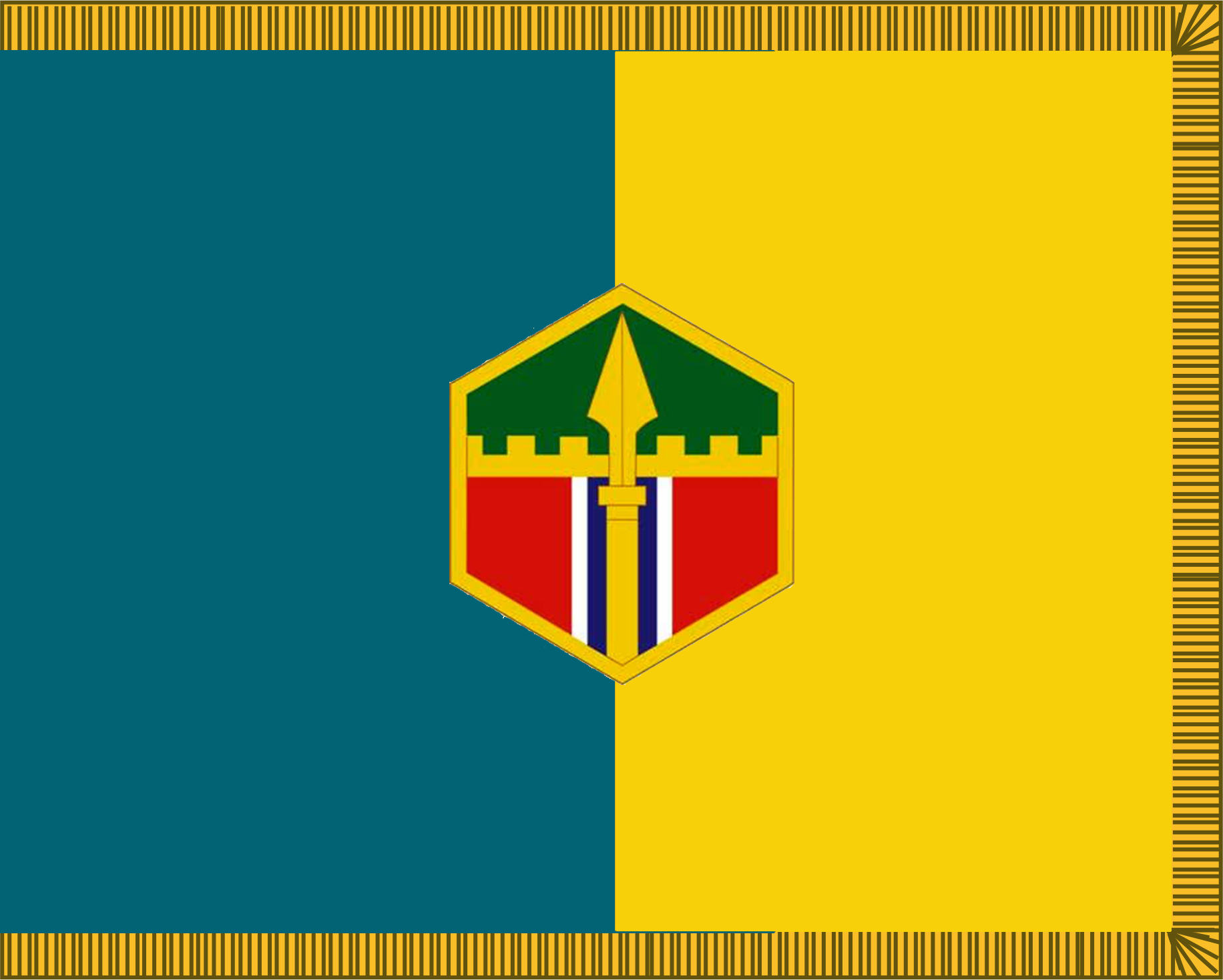
- 301st Maneuver Enhancement Brigade Flag

301st Maneuver Enhancement Brigade is a United States Army Reserve unit based in Joint Base Lewis-McChord, Washington organized first at Fort Lawton, Seattle in 2007, then moved to Joint Base Lewis-McCord in 2008. The Maneuver Enhancement Brigade is a brigade size headquarters with a modular organization that is designed to provide support to the combatant commander within an assigned area of responsibility (AOR). The MEB is a command and control headquarters with a robust multifunctional brigade staff that is optimized to conduct support area operations. The MEB provides mission command of assigned units during peace time, homeland security, homeland defense, and civil support missions within the United States.

== Organization ==
The brigade is a subordinate unit of the 416th Theater Engineer Command. As of January 2026 the brigade consists of the following units:

- 301st Maneuver Enhancement Brigade, at Joint Base Lewis–McChord (WA)
  - Headquarters and Headquarters Company, 301st Maneuver Enhancement Brigade, at Joint Base Lewis–McChord (WA)
  - 315th Engineer Battalion, at Camp Pendleton (CA)
    - Headquarters and Headquarters Company, 315th Engineer Battalion, at Camp Pendleton (CA)
    - Forward Support Company, 315th Engineer Battalion, at Camp Pendleton (CA)
    - 305th Engineer Company (Clearance), in San Diego (CA)
    - 350th Engineer Company (Vertical Construction Company — VCC), in Bell (CA)
    - 387th Engineer Company (Engineer Construction Company — ECC), in Scottsdale (AZ)
    - 394th Engineer Company (Vertical Construction Company — VCC), in Bell (CA)
    - 450th Engineer Platoon (Area Clearance), at Camp Pendleton (CA)
  - 321st Engineer Battalion, in Boise (ID)
    - Headquarters and Headquarters Company, 321st Engineer Battalion, in Boise (ID)
    - Forward Support Company, 321st Engineer Battalion, in Boise (ID)
    - 391st Engineer Company (Mobility Augmentation Company — MAC), in Boise (ID)
    - 455th Engineer Company (Combat Engineer Company — Infantry) (CEC-I), in Hayden (ID)
    - 659th Engineer Company (Engineer Construction Company — ECC), at Fairchild Air Force Base (WA)
    - 671st Engineer Company (Multirole Bridge — MRB), at Camp Withycombe (OR)
      - Detachment 1, 671st Engineer Company (Multirole Bridge — MRB), in Marysville (WA)
    - 672nd Engineer Detachment (Utilities), in Missoula (MT)
    - 744th Engineer Company (Mobility Augmentation Company — MAC), in Ogden (UT)
    - 751st Engineer Detachment (Concrete Section), at Fairchild Air Force Base (WA)
    - 306th Engineer Detachment (Fire Fighting Team — HQ), in Yakima (WA)
    - 314th Engineer Detachment (Fire Fighting Team — Fire Truck), in Tustin (CA)
    - 582nd Engineer Detachment (Fire Fighting Team — Fire Truck), in Tustin (CA)
    - 593rd Engineer Detachment (Fire Fighting Team — Fire Truck), in Tustin (CA)
    - 614th Engineer Detachment (Fire Fighting Team — Fire Truck), in Yakima (WA)
    - 702nd Engineer Detachment (Fire Fighting Team — Fire Truck), in Yakima (WA)
    - 907th Engineer Detachment (Fire Fighting Team — HQ), in Yakima (WA)
  - 397th Engineer Battalion, in Marina (CA)
    - Headquarters and Headquarters Company, 397th Engineer Battalion, in Marina (CA)
    - Forward Support Company, 397th Engineer Battalion, in Marina (CA)
    - 322nd Engineer Company (Vertical Construction Company — VCC), in Sloan (NV)
    - 374th Engineer Company (Sapper), in Concord (CA)
    - 386th Engineer Company (Clearance), in Sloan (NV)
    - 485th Engineer Platoon (Area Clearance), in Sloan (NV)
    - 801st Engineer Company (Engineer Construction Company — ECC), in Vallejo (CA)
