= 321st Engineer Battalion (United States) =

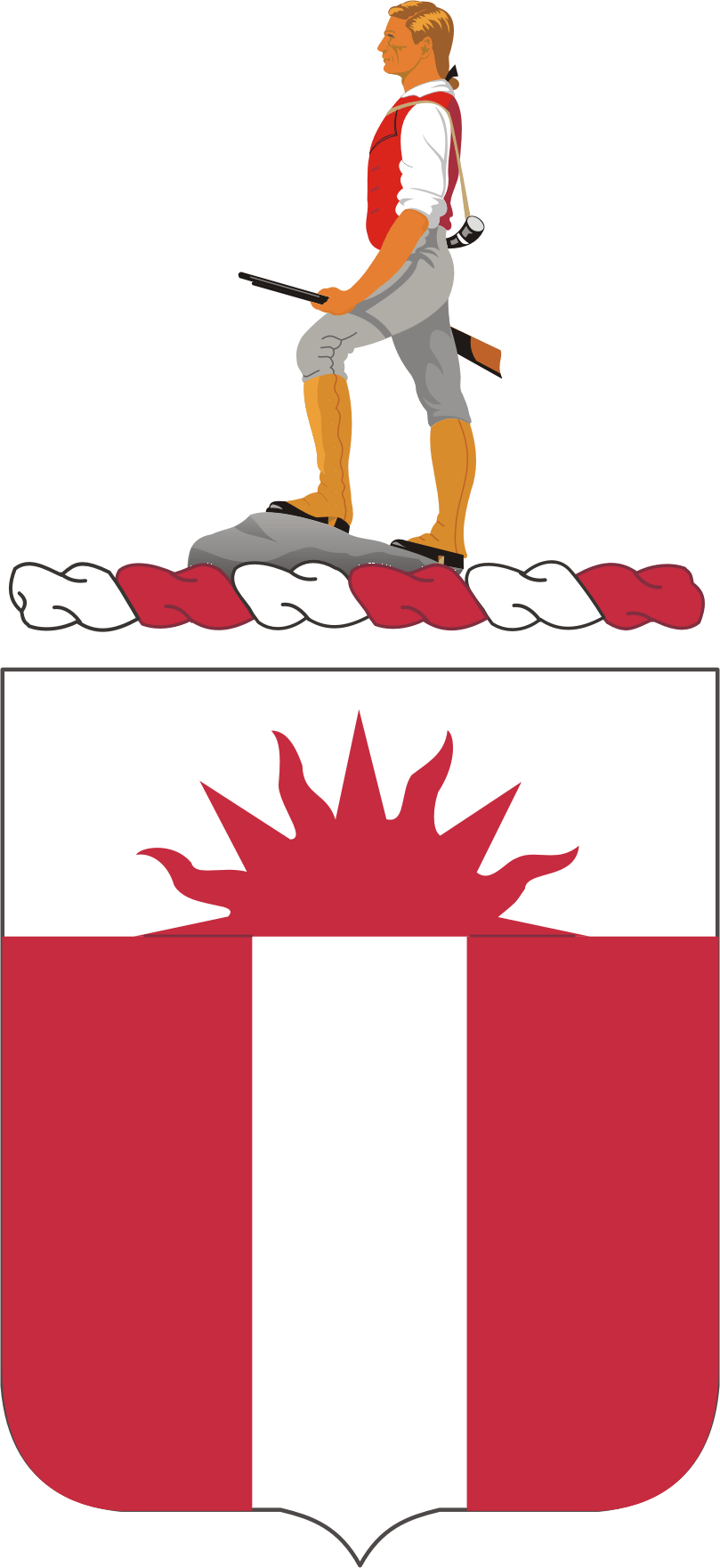
- Coat of Arms of the 321st Engineer Battalion
- Active: 1918
- Country: USA
- Branch: United States Army Reserve
- Type: Combat Engineer
- Mottos: "Semper Tentare," to Always Try
- Engagements: World War II; Operation Iraqi Freedom

Insignia
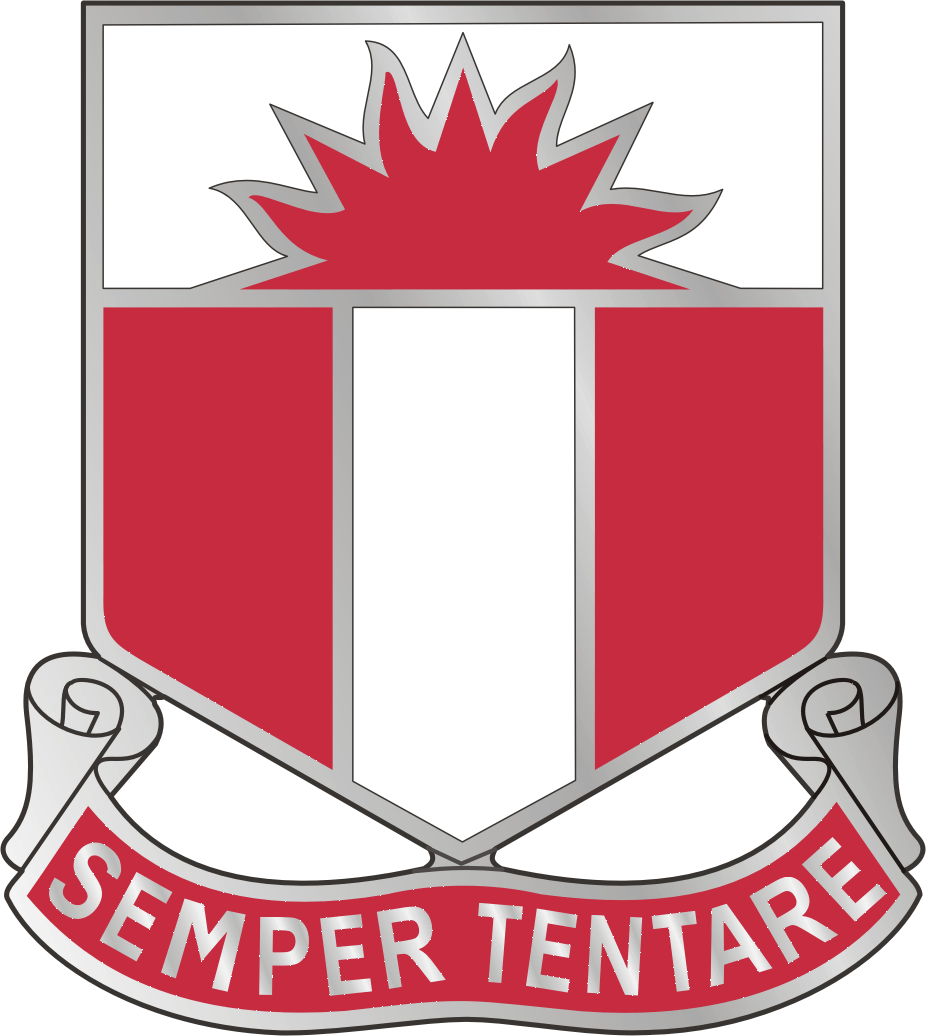
- Distinctive Unit Insignia

The 321st Engineer Battalion is an Army Reserve battalion with active service in World War II and Operation Iraqi Freedom.

== Organization ==
The battalion is a subordinate unit of the 301st Maneuver Enhancement Brigade. As of January 2026 the battalion consists of the following units:

- 321st Engineer Battalion, in Boise (ID)
  - Headquarters and Headquarters Company, 321st Engineer Battalion, in Boise (ID)
  - Forward Support Company, 321st Engineer Battalion, in Boise (ID)
  - 391st Engineer Company (Mobility Augmentation Company — MAC), in Boise (ID)
  - 455th Engineer Company (Combat Engineer Company — Infantry) (CEC-I), in Hayden (ID)
  - 659th Engineer Company (Engineer Construction Company — ECC), at Fairchild Air Force Base (WA)
  - 671st Engineer Company (Multirole Bridge — MRB), at Camp Withycombe (OR)
    - Detachment 1, 671st Engineer Company (Multirole Bridge — MRB), in Marysville (WA)
  - 672nd Engineer Detachment (Utilities), in Missoula (MT)
  - 744th Engineer Company (Mobility Augmentation Company — MAC), in Ogden (UT)
  - 751st Engineer Detachment (Concrete Section), at Fairchild Air Force Base (WA)
  - 306th Engineer Detachment (Fire Fighting Team — HQ), in Yakima (WA)
  - 314th Engineer Detachment (Fire Fighting Team — Fire Truck), in Tustin (CA)
  - 582nd Engineer Detachment (Fire Fighting Team — Fire Truck), in Tustin (CA)
  - 593rd Engineer Detachment (Fire Fighting Team — Fire Truck), in Tustin (CA)
  - 614th Engineer Detachment (Fire Fighting Team — Fire Truck), in Yakima (WA)
  - 702nd Engineer Detachment (Fire Fighting Team — Fire Truck), in Yakima (WA)
  - 907th Engineer Detachment (Fire Fighting Team — HQ), in Yakima (WA)

== History ==
The 321st Engineer Battalion was constituted in the National Army on 5 September 1918 as the 321st Engineers, and assigned to the 96th Division. Four months later, on 7 January 1919, the unit was disbanded. The unit was reconstituted in the Organized Reserves on 24 June 1921 as the 321st Engineers, again assigned to the 96th Division. The battalion was organized in Seattle, Washington in January 1922. On 30 January 1942, the unit was reorganized as an element of the 96th Infantry Division, and redesignated as the 321st Engineer Battalion. The battalion was ordered to active service along with the 96th Infantry Division on 15 August 1942. This time, they were organized at Camp Adair, Oregon as the 321st Engineer Combat Battalion. After service in the Pacific Theater, the unit was inactivated at Camp Anza, California on 3 February 1946. On 1 December 1946, the battalion was activated with headquarters in Reno, Nevada. On 10 November 1948, the headquarters were moved to Boise, Idaho. On 15 November 1953, the battalion was again redesignated as the 321st Engineer Battalion. They were relieved from assignment to the 96th Infantry Division on 15 February 1963. The unit was reassigned to the 70th Regional Support Command in 1996. The battalion was activated as the lead element of Task Force Pathfinder, in support of Operation Iraqi Freedom, in 2006. The 321st Engineer Battalion now falls under the 301st Maneuver Enhancement Brigade, headquartered at Ft. Lewis, WA.

== Combat history ==
The 321st Engineer Battalion served with the 96th Infantry Division, including combat duty in the Pacific Theater, from 1942 to 1946. Major areas of operation include Leyte Island, Philippines, and Okinawa, Japan.

The battalion was activated as the lead element of Task Force Pathfinder in support of Operation Iraqi Freedom from September 2006 to October 2007. Major areas of operation include Al Anbar, Iraq, specifically Ar Ramadi, and Fallujah.

== Insignia ==
A silver metal and enamel device, 1 3/32 inches in height overall consisting of a shield blazoned: Gules, a pale Argent, on a chief of the last a setting sun of the first. Attached below the shield a red scroll, upturned, inscribed "Semper Tentare".

=== Symbolism ===
The shield is red and white, the colors of the Engineer Corps. The pale stripe represents the Columbia River and the setting sun symbolizes that unit is organized in the westernmost states. Semper Tentare is translated to be "To Always Try."

=== History ===
The insignia was originally approved for the 321st Engineer Regiment, Organized Reserves on 14 July 1930. On 22 September 1942 it was redesignated for the 321st Engineer Battalion.

== Decorations ==
- Presidential Unit Citation (Army) for Okinawa
- Meritorious Unit Commendation (Army) for the Pacific Theater – 1944
- Meritorious Unit Commendation (Army) for the Pacific Theater – 1945
- Philippine Presidential Unit Citation for 17 October 1944 to 4 July 1945.
- Navy Unit Commendation for service as part of 1st Marine Expeditionary Force (Forward) – 2006–2007
- Valorous Unit Award(Army) for Operation Iraqi Freedom – 2007

== See also ==
- Coats of arms of U.S. Engineer Battalions
