= Task Force White Eagle =

Polish land force in Afghanistan

Task Force White Eagle (in Polish referred as Polskie Siły Zadaniowe (Polish Task Force) or Polski Kontyngent Wojskowy w Afganistanie (Polish Military Contingent in Afghanistan)) was a brigade sized detachment of Polish Land Forces in Ghazni Province, Afghanistan. The brigade was under the command of the US 1st Cavalry Division. 30 October 2008 Polish forces taking over responsibility for Ghazni province. Throughout the activity of the Polish contingent in Afghanistan occurred fighting with the Taliban and other rebels. Polish troops took part in many military operations. During the mission 44 Polish soldiers were killed.

== Structures ==
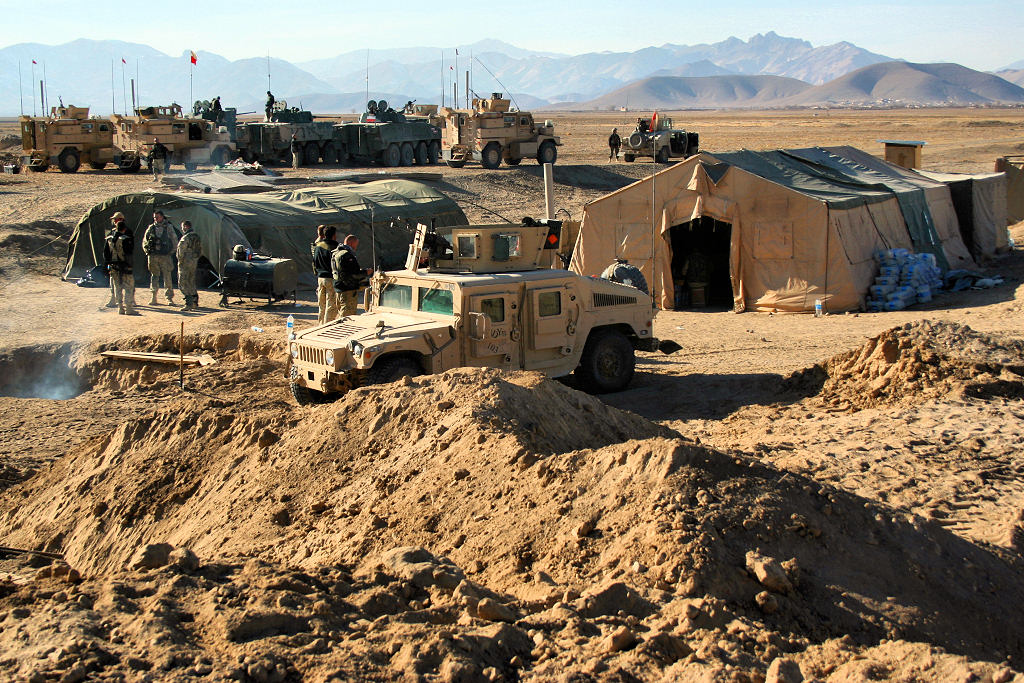
Polish soldiers of Battle Group B in Afghanistan guarding Highway 1 connecting Kabul and Kandahar.

The brigade was divided into two major elements. The kinetic element consisted of units that are going into direct contact with the enemy and the non-kinetic element consists of support and logistic units.

- Kinetic elements
  - Battle Group A (battalion sized) - FOB Ghazni, FB Four Corners
    - 1st Mechanized Infantry Company (five infantry platoons)
    - 2nd Mechanized Infantry Company (five infantry platoons)
    - Logistic Company
    - Engineering Group
  - Battle Group B (battalion sized) - FOB Warrior, FB Giro, COP Qarabagh
    - 1st Mechanized Infantry Company (five infantry platoons)
    - 2nd Mechanized Infantry Company (five infantry platoons)
    - Logistic Company
    - Engineering Group
  - Special Operations Group - FOB Ghazni (JW Komandosów TF50, JW Grom TF49)
  - Reconnaissance Group - COP Ajiristan
  - Independent Air Group - FOB Ghazni

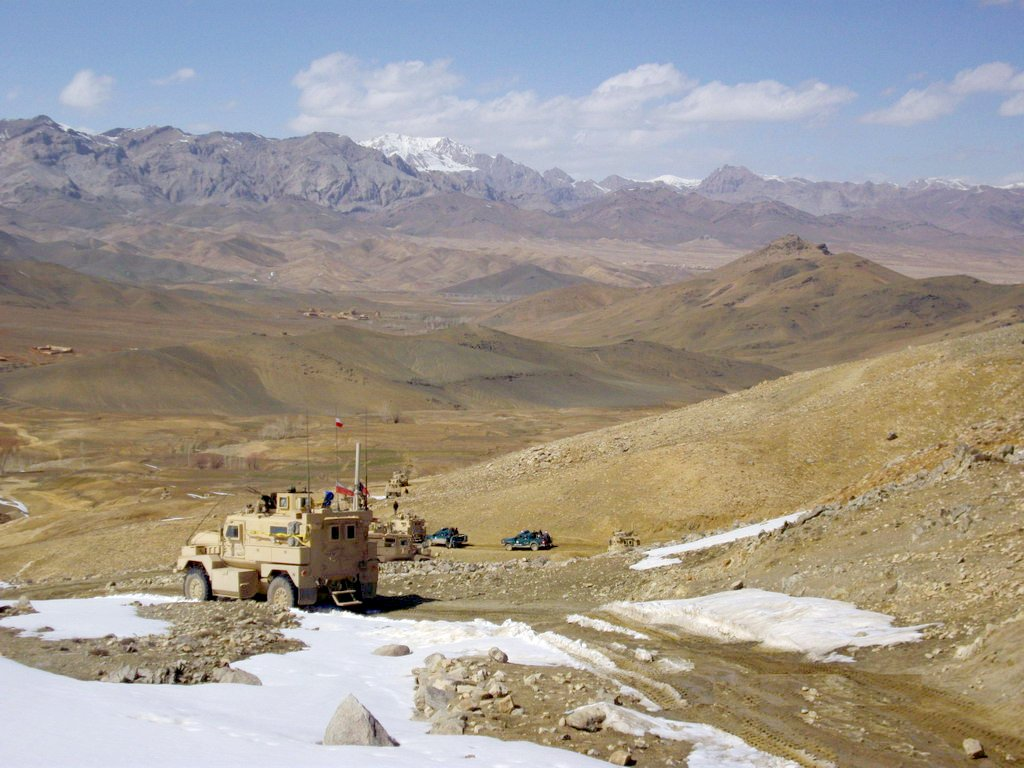
Polish Army Cougars on Operation Passage

- Non-kinetic elements
  - Psychological Operations Group
  - Civil-Military Co-operation Group
    - 1st Tactical Support Group
    - 2nd Tactical Support Group
  - Operational Mentoring & Liaison Team no 1 (3rd Brigade, 203rd Corps ANA)
  - Operational Mentoring & Liaison Team no 2 (1st battalion, 3rd Brigade, 203rd Corps ANA)
  - Operational Mentoring & Liaison Team no 3 (2nd battalion, 3rd Brigade, 203rd Corps ANA)
  - Provincial Reconstruction Team Ghazni (USA/POL)
  - Agriculture Development Team Ghazni (USA)
  - Medical Support Group - FOB Ghazni
  - National Support Element - FOB Ghazni
    - Detached Logistic Support Group
  - Forward Surgical Teams (USA) - FOB Ghazni

== Size ==
Turn	Time frame	Commander	Unit	Number of Soldiers
I OEF	16.03.2002 - October 2002	ppłk Marek Mecherzyński	1 Brzeski Pułk Saperów	120-180
II OEF	October 2002 - April 2003	ppłk Adam Słodczyk	1 Brzeski Pułk Saperów	180
III OEF	April 2003 - October 2003	ppłk Henryk Łukasiewicz	1 Brzeski Pułk Saperów	100
IV OEF	October 2003 - April 2004	ppłk Krzysztof Klupa	1 Brzeski Pułk Saperów	100
V OEF	April 2004 - 07.10.2004	ppłk Krzysztof Klupa	1 Brzeski Pułk Saperów	100
VI OEF	07.10.2004 - March 2005	ppłk Lesław Kruczyński	1 Brzeski Pułk Saperów	100
VII OEF	March 2004 - 05.10.2005	ppłk Piotr Bednarczyk	1 Brzeski Pułk Saperów	100
VIII OEF	05.10.2005 - 10.04.2006	ppłk Dariusz Tulin	1 Brzeski Pułk Saperów	100
IX OEF	10.04.2006 - 09.10.2006	ppłk Bogdan Papierski	2 Mazowiecka Brygada Saperów	100
X OEF	09.10.2006 - 25.04.2007	ppłk Piotr Sołomonow	5 Pułk Inżynieryjny	150
I ISAF	25.04.2007 - 31.10.2007	gen. dyw. Marek Tomaszycki	10 Brygada Kawalerii Pancernej	1200
II ISAF	31.10.2007 - 15.05.2008	gen. bryg. Jerzy Biziewski	17 Brygada Zmechanizowana	1200
III ISAF	15.05.2008 - 30.10.2008	gen. bryg. Grzegorz Buszka	12 Brygada Zmechanizowana	1200
IV ISAF	30.10.2008 - 29.04.2009	płk Rajmund Andrzejczak	12 Dywizja Zmechanizowana	1600 (+ USA ~150)
V ISAF	29.04.2009 - 26.10.2009	płk Rajmund Andrzejczak	6 Brygada Powietrznodesantowa	2000 (+ USA ~150)
VI ISAF	26.10.2009 - 20.04.2010	gen. bryg. Janusz Bronowicz	21 Brygada Strzelców Podhalańskich	2200 - 2000 (+ USA ~150)
VII ISAF	20.04.2010 - 28.10.2010	gen. bryg. Andrzej Przekwas	1 Dywizja Zmechanizowana	2600
VIII ISAF	28.10.2010 - 20.04.2011	gen. bryg. Andrzej Reudowicz	10 Brygada Kawalerii Pancernej	2600 (+ USA ~1100)
IX ISAF	20.04.2011 - 26.10.2011	gen. bryg. Sławomir Wojciechowski	17 Brygada Zmechanizowana	2600
X ISAF	26.10.2011 - 18.04.2012	gen. bryg. Piotr Błazeusz	15 Brygada Zmechanizowana	2500
XI ISAF	18.04.2012 - 24.10.2012	gen. bryg. Bogdan Tworkowski	6 Brygada Powietrznodesantowa	2500
XII ISAF	24.10.2012 - 08.05.2013	gen. bryg. Andrzej Tuz	12 Brygada Zmechanizowana	1800
XIII ISAF	08.05.2013 - 26.11.2013	gen. bryg. Marek Sokołowski	25 Brygada Kawalerii Powietrznej	1600
XIV ISAF	26.11.2013 - 05.06.2014	gen. bryg. Cezary Podlasiński	10 Brygada Kawalerii Pancernej	1000
XV ISAF	05.06.2014 - 04.12.2014	płk Adam Słodczyk	10 Opolska Brygada Logistyczna	500
I RSM	04.12.2014 - 12.06.2015	płk Wojciech Marchwica	21 Brygada Strzelców Podhalańskich	120
II RSM	13.06.2015 - 02.12.2015	płk Adam Luzyńczyk	10 Brygada Kawalerii Pancernej	200
III RSM	02.12.2015 - 01.06.2016	płk Dariusz Kosowski	20 Brygada Zmechanizowana	200
IV RSM	01.06.2016 - 01.12.2016	płk Zbigniew Zalewski	8 Pułk Przeciwlotniczy	200
V RSM	01.12.2016 - 01.06.2017	płk Marek Rakowski	1 Warszawska Brygada Pancerna	200
VI RSM	01.06.2017 - 01.12.2017	płk Piotr Fajkowski	15 Giżycka Brygada Zmechanizowana	250
VII RSM	01.12.2017 - 01.06.2018	płk Grzegorz Potrzuski	10 Brygada Kawalerii Pancernej	250
VIII RSM	01.06.2018 - 2021	płk Piotr Kaczmarek	34 Brygada Kawalerii Pancernej z Żagania	300

== Equipment ==
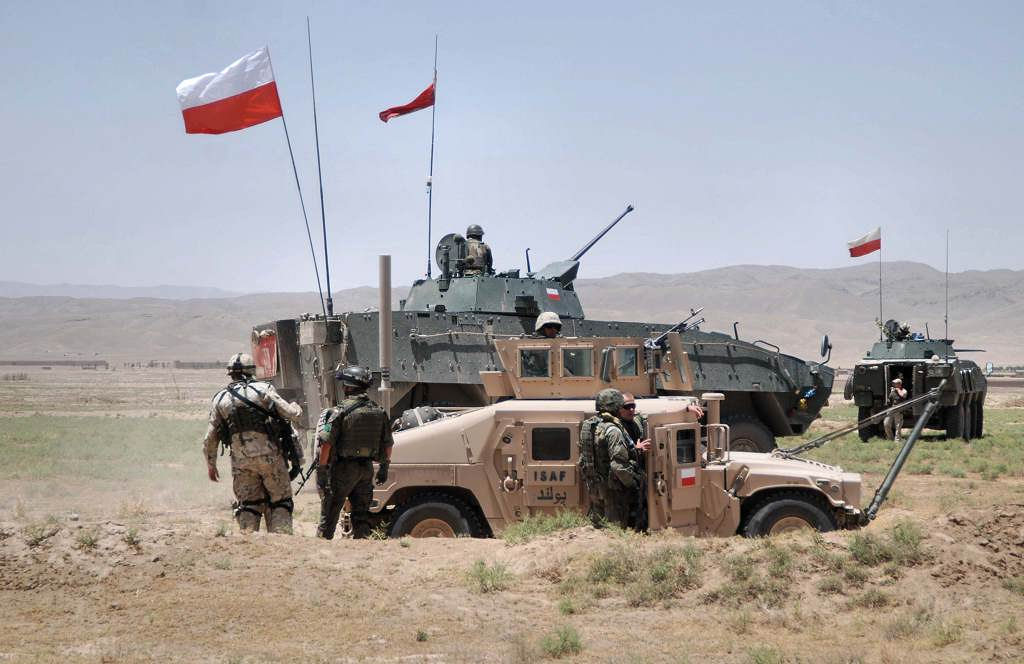
Polish soldiers of CIMIC Group July 2008

The basic combat vehicle of Battle Groups is KTO Rosomak in various variants. Rosomak is complemented by Cougar H (MRAP) (from late 2008) and HMMWV leased from the USA. Lightly armored HMMWVs are used only in situations that exclude use of heavier vehicles. Fire support is provided by 98mm M-98 mortars and 152mm Dana howitzers. Air support is provided by Independent Air Group using Mi-17 and Mi-24 helicopters as well as UAVs. From 2010 there were used MaxxPro MRAP, followed by Oshkosh M-ATV.

== See also ==
- List of NATO installations in Afghanistan
- List of Afghan Armed Forces installations
