= 315th Engineer Battalion =

- Active: 5 August 1917 – present
- Country: United States
- Allegiance: United States Army
- Branch: US Army Reserve
- Role: Engineers
- Size: Battalion
- Garrison/HQ: MCAS Miramar, California

Commanders
- Commander: LTC Kyle Wagner
- Command Sergeant Major: CSM Ricci Molina

The 315th Engineer Battalion is a multi-role engineer battalion of the United States Army based in Camp Pendleton, California. Activated 16 October 2009 at Camp Pendleton, the battalion traces its lineage back to World War I. It is a United States Army Reserve formation and is subordinate to the 301st Maneuver Enhancement Brigade out of Fort Lewis, WA.

== Organization ==
The battalion is a subordinate unit of the 301st Maneuver Enhancement Brigade. As of January 2026 the battalion consists of the following units:

- 315th Engineer Battalion, at Camp Pendleton (CA)
  - Headquarters and Headquarters Company, 315th Engineer Battalion, at Camp Pendleton (CA)
  - Forward Support Company, 315th Engineer Battalion, at Camp Pendleton (CA)
  - 305th Engineer Company (Clearance), in San Diego (CA)
  - 350th Engineer Company (Vertical Construction Company — VCC), in Bell (CA)
  - 387th Engineer Company (Engineer Construction Company — ECC), in Scottsdale (AZ)
  - 394th Engineer Company (Vertical Construction Company — VCC), in Bell (CA)
  - 450th Engineer Platoon (Area Clearance), at Camp Pendleton (CA)

== Lineage ==
Constituted 5 August 1917 in the National Army as the 315th Engineers, an element of the 90th Division

Organized in August 1917 at Camp Travis, Texas

Demobilized 26 June 1919 at Camp Dodge, Iowa

Reconstituted 24 June 1921 in the Organized Reserves as the 315th Engineers, an element of the 90th Division

Organized in November 1921 at San Antonio, Texas

Regiment (less 2d Battalion) reorganized and redesignated 30 January 1942 as the 315th Engineer Battalion, an element of the 90th Division (later designated as the 90th Infantry Division) (2d Battalion concurrently reorganized and redesignated as the 869th Engineer Battalion—hearafter separate lineage)

Ordered into active military service 25 March 1942 at Camp Barkeley, Texas

Reorganized and Redesignated 15 September 1942 as the 315th Engineer Motorized Battalion

Reorganized and redesignated 19 May 1943 as the 315th Engineer Combat Battalion

Inactivated 22 December 1945 at Camp Patrick Henry, Virginia

Activated 28 April 1947 at San Antonio, Texas

(Organized Reserves redesignated 25 March 1948 as the Organized Reserve Corps; redesignated 9 July 1952 as the Army Reserve)

Reorganized and redesignated 6 April 1953 as the 315th Engineer Battalion

(Location of Headquarters changed 1 April 1959 to Houston, Texas)

Inactivated 31 December 1965 at Houston, Texas, and relieved from assignment from the 90th Infantry Division

Headquarters activated 16 October 2009 at Camp Pendleton, California.

315th Engineer Battalion deployed in 2014 ISO OEF - Afghanistan.

As of June 2021, Battalion is pending relocation to Miramar MCAS - East.

== Honors ==
=== Campaign streamers ===
Conflict	Streamer
World War I	St. Mihel
World War I	Muese-Argonne
World War I	Lorraine 1918
World War II	Normandy (with arrowhead)
World War II	Northern France
World War II	Rhineland
World War II	Ardennes-Alsace
World War II	Central Europe
Operation Enduring Freedom	Afghanistan

=== Unit Decorations ===
Award	Year(s)	Notes
Meritorious Unit Commendation (Army)	JUNE - AUGUST 1944	For service in the European Theater
Meritorious Unit Commendation (Army)	AUGUST 1944 - FEBRUARY 1945	For service in the European Theater
