= 372nd Engineer Brigade =

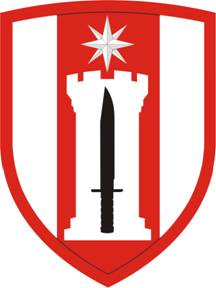
- 372nd Engineer Brigade Shoulder Sleeve Insignia
- Active: 1928 – Present
- Country: United States
- Branch: United States Army Reserve
- Role: Combat engineers
- Size: Brigade
- Part of: 416th Engineer Command (United States)
- Garrison/HQ: Fort Snelling, Minnesota

Commanders
- Commander: COL Elliot Schroeder
- Command Sergeant Major: CSM David Lehr

Insignia
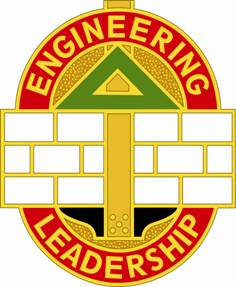
- Distinctive Unit Insignia

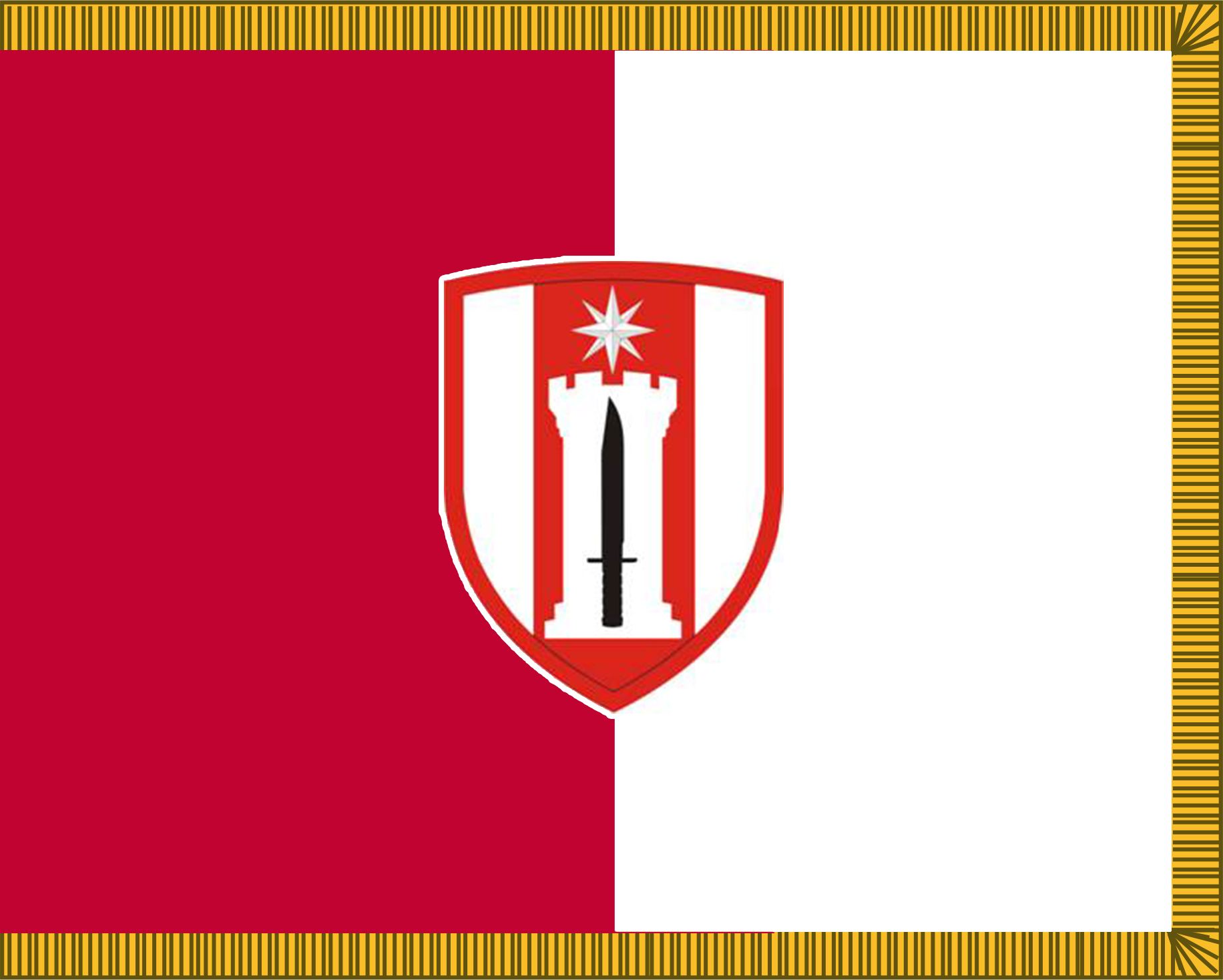
- 372nd Engineer Brigade Flag

The 372nd Engineer Brigade is a combat engineer brigade of the United States Army based in Fort Snelling, Minnesota. Recently converted from the 372nd Engineer Group which traces its lineage back to World War II, the brigade was activated on 16 September 2008. It is a United States Army Reserve formation and is subordinate to the 416th Theater Engineer Command out of Darien, Illinois.

== Organization ==
The brigade is a subordinate unit of the 416th Theater Engineer Command. As of January 2026 the brigade consists of the following units:

- 372nd Engineer Brigade, at Fort Snelling (MN)
  - Headquarters and Headquarters Company, 372nd Engineer Brigade, at Fort Snelling (MN)
  - 367th Engineer Battalion, in St. Cloud (MN)
    - Headquarters and Headquarters Company, 367th Engineer Battalion, in St. Joseph (MN)
    - Forward Support Company, 367th Engineer Battalion, in St. Joseph (MN)
    - 309th Engineer Company (Combat Engineer Company — Infantry) (CEC-I), in Brainerd (MN)
    - 327th Engineer Company (Vertical Construction Company — VCC), in Onalaska (WI)
    - 492nd Engineer Company (Vertical Construction Company — VCC), in Mankato (MN))
    - 652nd Engineer Company (Multirole Bridge — MRB), in Hammond (WI)
      - Detachment 1, 652nd Engineer Company (Multirole Bridge — MRB), in Marquette (MI)
      - Detachment 2, 652nd Engineer Company (Multirole Bridge — MRB), in Cambridge (MN)
    - 461st Engineer Detachment (Utilities), in Fargo (ND)
    - 612th Engineer Detachment (Utilities), in Duluth (MN)
    - 945th Engineer Detachment (Utilities), in Bismarck (ND)
  - 863rd Engineer Battalion, in Darien (IL)
    - Headquarters and Headquarters Company, 863rd Engineer Battalion, in Darien (IL)
    - Forward Support Company, 863rd Engineer Battalion, in Darien (IL)
    - 317th Engineer Company (Engineer Construction Company — ECC), in Homewood (IL)
    - 372nd Engineer Company (Vertical Construction Company — VCC), in Pewaukee (WI)
    - 469th Engineer Company (Combat Engineer Company — Infantry) (CEC-I), in Machesney Park (IL)
    - 483rd Engineer Platoon (Area Clearance), in Elwood (IL)
    - 485th Engineer Company (Vertical Construction Company — VCC), in Arlington Heights (IL)
    - 609th Engineer Detachment (Concrete Section), in Milwaukee (WI)
    - 966th Engineer Company (Engineer Construction Company — ECC), in Milwaukee (WI)
    - 237th Engineer Detachment (Fire Fighting Team — Fire Truck), in Sturtevant (WI)
    - 336th Engineer Detachment (Fire Fighting Team — Fire Truck), in Sturtevant (WI)
    - 482nd Engineer Detachment (Fire Fighting Team — HQ), in Sturtevant (WI)
    - 628th Engineer Detachment (Fire Fighting Team — Fire Truck), in Sturtevant (WI)
    - 750th Engineer Detachment (Fire Fighting Team — Fire Truck), in Sturtevant (WI)
    - 923rd Engineer Detachment (Fire Fighting Team — Fire Truck), in Sturtevant (WI)
  - 983rd Engineer Battalion, in Monclova (OH)
    - Headquarters and Headquarters Company, 983rd Engineer Battalion, in Monclova (OH)
    - Forward Support Company, 983rd Engineer Battalion, in Monclova (OH)
    - 304th Engineer Company (Vertical Construction Company — VCC), in Lima (OH)
      - 2nd Platoon, 304th Engineer Company (Vertical Construction Company — VCC), in Bryan (OH)
    - 351st Engineer Detachment (Utilities), in Franklin (IN)
    - 428th Engineer Company (Combat Engineer Company — Infantry) (CEC-I), in Southfield (MI)
    - 486th Engineer Company (Vertical Construction Company — VCC), in Monclova (OH)
    - 601st Engineer Detachment (Utilities), in Southfield (MI)
    - 943rd Engineer Detachment (Concrete Section), in Trenton (OH)
    - 961st Engineer Company (Engineer Construction Company — ECC), in Trenton (OH)
      - 2nd Platoon, 961st Engineer Company (Engineer Construction Company — ECC), in Franklin (IN)

== Lineage ==
Constituted 5 September 1928 in the Organized Reserves as Headquarters and Headquarters and Service Company, 337th Engineer Regiment

Organized by July 1931 at Huntington, West Virginia

Ordered into active military service 20 July 1942 at Camp Swift, Texas

Redesignated 1 August 1942 as Headquarters and Headquarters and Service Company, 337th Engineer General Service Regiment

Disbanded 16 September 1944 in Italy

Reconstituted 19 November 1946 in the Organized Reserves as Headquarters and Headquarters and Service Company, 337th Engineer General Service Regiment

Activated 2 December 1946 at Baltimore, Maryland

(Organized Reserves redesignated 25 March 1948 as the Organized Reserve Corps; redesignated 9 July 1952 as the Army Reserve)

Inactivated 9 February 1949 at Baltimore, Maryland

Redesignated 8 June 1949 as Headquarters and Headquarters Company, 372d Engineer Construction Group

Activated 25 July 1949 at Des Moines, Iowa

Reorganized and redesignated 1 February 1954 as Headquarters and Headquarters Company, 372d Engineer Group

Inactivated 28 May 1959 at Des Moines, Iowa

Activated 15 March 1963 at Des Moines, Iowa

Ordered into active military service 7 December 2003 at Des Moines, Iowa; released from active military service 3 June 2005 and reverted to reserve status

Location changed 17 April 2007 to Fort Snelling, Minnesota

Reorganized and redesignated 16 September 2008 as Headquarters and Headquarters Company, 372d Engineer Brigade

== Honors ==
=== Campaign streamers ===
Conflict	Streamer	Year(s)
World War II	Naples-Foggia	
World War II	Rome-Arno	
World War II	North Apennines	
War on terror	Operation Enduring Freedom	2009–2010

=== Unit Decorations ===
Meritorious Unit Citation, Citation awarded to the 372nd Engineer Brigade for actions in Afghanistan from November 2009 to September 2010.
