= Special Troops Battalion, 3rd Brigade Combat Team, 101st Airborne Division =

Military unit

The Special Troops Battalion, 3rd Brigade Combat Team, 101st Airborne Division, Fort Campbell, Kentucky, was a multi-functional battalion created on 16 September 2004 as part of the U.S. Army's brigade realignment plan to transform brigades into units of action (UA). It brought together a combat engineer company from the 326th Engineer Battalion (Combat) (Airborne) and signal and military intelligence companies formerly affiliated with inactivated battalions in the 101st Airborne Division. Although one former member of the battalion recalled that the Rakkasans were "almost like a cult in every sense," the battalion itself was largely an administrative entity rather than a cohesive operational unit. With disparate roles, its component units operated separately outside of garrison, supporting maneuver battalions or the brigade itself during training and deployments.

The battalion's mottoes, "Rak Solid" and "Belong to the Warrior," were statements of the battalion's support to, and affiliation with, the 187th Infantry Regiment, whose 1st, 2nd, and 3rd battalions formed the core combat power of the 3rd Brigade Combat Team.

== Units ==
3rd Special Troops Battalion comprised the following companies:

- Headquarters and Headquarters Company (HHC) – HHC provides staff support; a support platoon including fuelers, mechanics, medics, cooks, and security; a Chemical, Biological, Radiological, and Nuclear (CBRN) "Recce" Platoon, and a Military Police platoon.
- Alpha Company – Providing combat engineer assets to the brigade. The company's nickname was "The Zone," a tribute to its extensive service in the combat zones of World War II and Vietnam. "Zone Rakksans," the unit's call sign, continued to fulfill its reputation in the late 20th and 21st centuries, with combat multiple deployments in Operation Desert Storm, Operation Enduring Freedom, and Operation Iraqi Freedom.
- Bravo Company – Providing military intelligence assets.
- Charlie Company – Providing military communications support to the 3rd BCT.

== History ==
The Special Troops Battalion was initially formed at Fort Collins, Colorado, in December 2004. Companies from the 326th Engineer Battalion, 311th Military Intelligence Battalion, 501st Signal Battalion, and the 3rd Platoon of the 101st Military Police Company were pulled together to form the STB. The integration of one or more special troops battalions into each brigade allowed them to be self-sustaining such that they no longer needed to deploy with the entire division in order to utilize divisional assets.

The Special Troops Battalion headed to the Joint Readiness Training Center (JRTC) in early February 2005 for training maneuvers with the rest of the Rakkasans. Upon redeployment to Fort Campbell, the unit spent the next six months training and preparing for a deployment to Iraq. In late September 2005, the STB deployed in support of Operation Iraqi Freedom IV. After staging in Kuwait for additional training and awaiting movement to Iraq, elements of the STB moved in country to begin a year-long tour. They relieved elements of the Tennessee National Guard in Bayji, Iraq, in fall 2005. Whereas Alpha Company fought as infantry throughout OIF IV, attached first to Task Force Leader (formed around 1st Battalion, 187th Infantry Regiment), Bravo and Charlie supported and conducted operations in that area of operations (AO).

In late December 2005, Alpha Company joined Task Force Iron (3rd Battalion, 187th Infantry Regiment) in Samarra, where it conducted counterinsurgency operations from Patrol Base Razor. Its area of operations included Al Qalaa and Hwaish, villages west of the city. Around the same time, Bravo, Charlie, and HHC headed to Tikrit to support the 101st Airborne Division elements stationed near COB Speicher. In early September 2006, the STB regrouped in Kuwait and redeployed to Fort Campbell, completing its first deployment to Iraq. After extensive pre-deployment training and a second JRTC rotation, the battalion headed back to Iraq in late September 2007. During this second OIF tour, the battalion operated in Baghdad for 15 months.

The battalion inactivated on 15 April 2014, and was reorganized and reflagged as the 21st Engineer Battalion.

== Chain of command ==
As of August 2011, the STB was commanded by Lieutenant Colonel Walter Smiley, with Command Sergeant Major Carlos Simmons as battalion Command Sergeant Major.

The battalion's final commander was Zachary Miller.
