= 420th Engineer Brigade (United States) =

- 420th Engineer Brigade Shoulder Sleeve Insignia
- Active: 1951 – Present
- Country: United States
- Branch: United States Army Reserve
- Type: Combat engineer brigade
- Role: Combat Engineers
- Size: Brigade
- Part of: 416th Engineer Command (United States)
- Garrison/HQ: Bryan, Texas
- Motto: Success: Our Blueprint

Commanders
- Current commander: COL Adam Rasmussen

Insignia
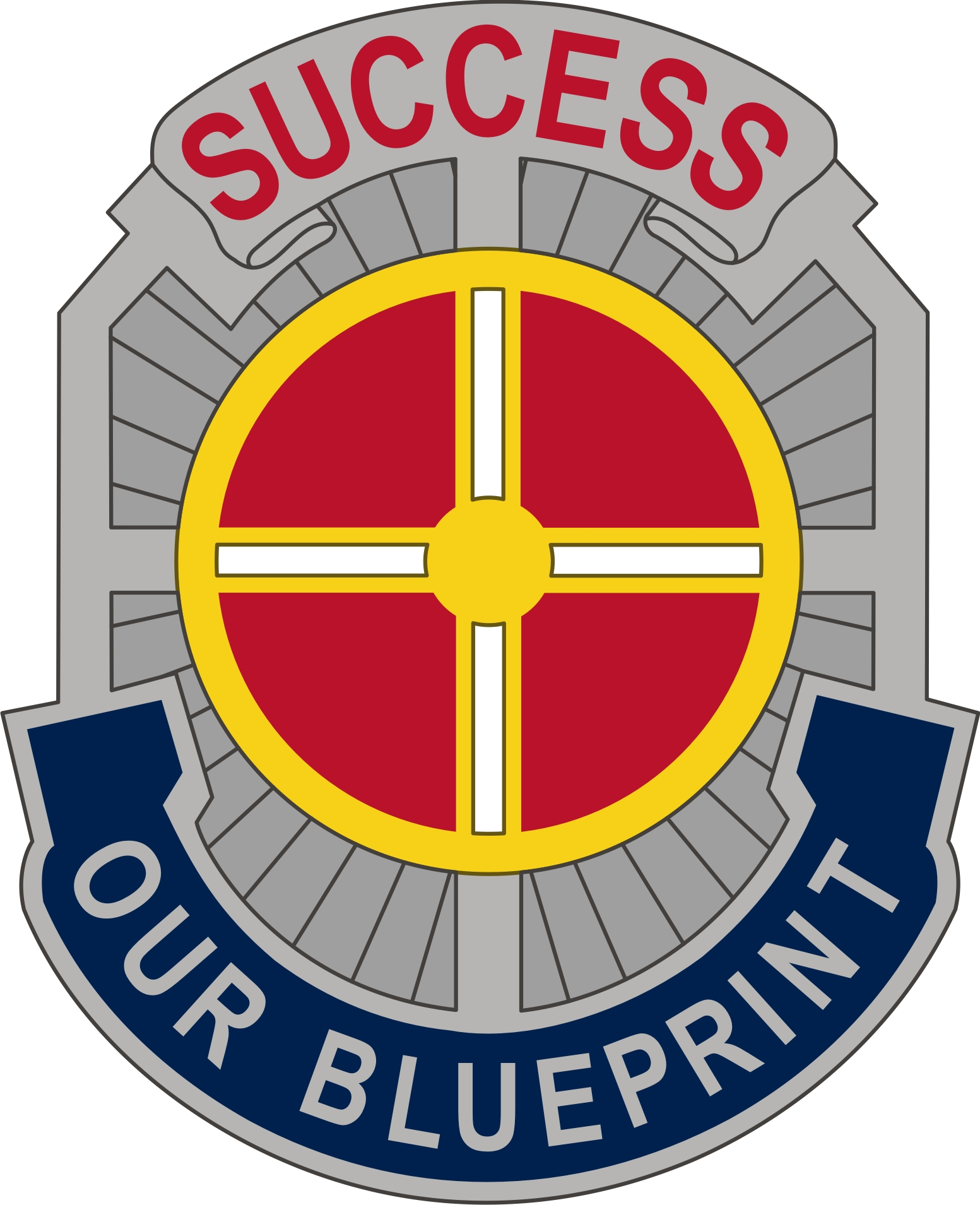
- Distinctive unit insignia

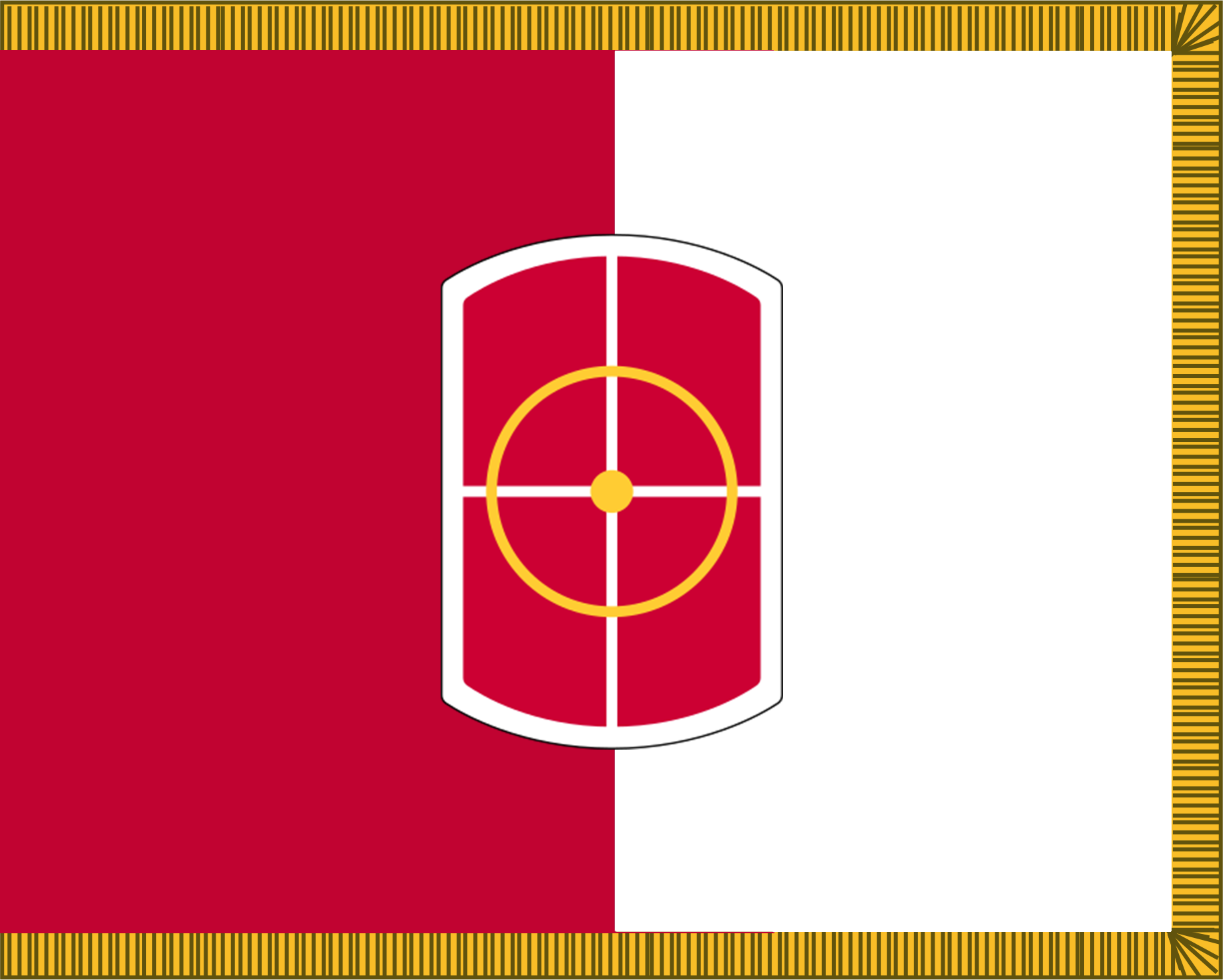
- 420th Engineer Brigade Flag

The 420th Engineer Brigade (Corps) is a combat engineer brigade of the United States Army based in Bryan, Texas. It is a United States Army Reserve formation and is subordinate to the 416th Theater Engineer Command.

== Background ==
The brigade is a Major Subordinate Command of the 416th Engineer Command in Darien, IL. The Commander, 420th Engineer Brigade commands and controls all Army Reserve engineer units in the states of Texas, Arkansas, Louisiana, Oklahoma, Missouri, Colorado, and New Mexico consisting of approximately 4,500 reserve soldiers. The units of the 420th Engineer Brigade have served in Operation Joint Forge in Bosnia, Operation Joint Endeavor in Kosovo, Operation Desert Storm, Operation Iraqi Freedom, and Operation Inherent Resolve in Iraq, Operation Enduring Freedom and Operation Resolute Support in Afghanistan. They have also participated in Exercises Bright Star in Egypt, Fuerte Caminos in Honduras and Belize, and Nuevas Horizontes in El Salvador, Panama, and Guatemala.

== Organization ==
The brigade is a subordinate unit of the 416th Theater Engineer Command. As of January 2026 the brigade consists of the following units:

- 420th Engineer Brigade, in Bryan (TX)
  - Headquarters and Headquarters Company, 420th Engineer Brigade, in Bryan (TX)
  - 489th Engineer Battalion, at Camp Robinson (AR)
    - Headquarters and Headquarters Company, 489th Engineer Battalion, at Camp Robinson (AR)
    - Forward Support Company, 489th Engineer Battalion, at Camp Robinson (AR)
    - 279th Engineer Detachment (Utilities), in St. Charles (MO)
    - 348th Engineer Company (Clearance), in Kansas City (MO)
    - 469th Engineer Platoon (Area Clearance), in Bentonville (AR)
    - 688th Engineer Company (Combat Engineer Company — Infantry) (CEC-I), in Harrison (AR)
    - 704th Engineer Company (Combat Engineer Company — Infantry) (CEC-I), in Hot Springs (AR)
    - 739th Engineer Company (Multirole Bridge — MRB), in Granite City (IL)
    - 806th Engineer Company (Clearance), in Conway (AR)
    - 855th Engineer Detachment (Utilities), at Fort Leonard Wood (MO)
    - 245th Engineer Detachment (Fire Fighting Team — Fire Truck), in Granite City (IL)
    - 324th Engineer Detachment (Fire Fighting Team — Fire Truck), in Granite City (IL)
    - 355th Engineer Detachment (Fire Fighting Team — Fire Truck), in Granite City (IL)
    - 376th Engineer Detachment (Fire Fighting Team — HQ), in Granite City (IL)
    - 459th Engineer Detachment (Fire Fighting Team — Fire Truck), in Granite City (IL)
    - 736th Engineer Detachment (Fire Fighting Team — Fire Truck), in Granite City (IL)
  - 961st Engineer Battalion, in Seagoville (TX)
    - Headquarters and Headquarters Company, 961st Engineer Battalion, in Seagoville (TX)
    - Forward Support Company, 961st Engineer Battalion, in Seagoville (TX)
    - 284th Engineer Company (Vertical Construction Company — VCC), in Seagoville (TX)
    - 341st Engineer Company (Multirole Bridge — MRB), at Fort Chaffee (AR)
    - Detachment 1, 341st Engineer Company (Multirole Bridge — MRB), in Muskogee (OK)
    - 364th Engineer Platoon (Area Clearance), in Bryan (TX)
    - 401st Engineer Company (Multirole Bridge — MRB), in Mustang (OK)
      - Detachment 1, 401st Engineer Company (Multirole Bridge — MRB), in Enid (OK)
    - 451st Engineer Platoon (Area Clearance), in Grand Prairie (TX)
    - 721st Engineer Company (Engineer Construction Company — ECC), in Grand Prairie (TX)
  - 980th Engineer Battalion, in Austin (TX)
    - Headquarters and Headquarters Company, 980th Engineer Battalion, in Austin (TX)
    - Forward Support Company, 980th Engineer Battalion, in Austin (TX)
    - 277th Engineer Company (Engineer Construction Company — ECC), at Camp Bullis (TX)
    - 302nd Engineer Company (Vertical Construction Company — VCC), at Camp Bullis (TX)
    - 312th Engineer Detachment (Concrete Section), at Camp Bullis (TX)
    - 319th Engineer Company (Engineer Support Company — ESC), at Fort Bliss (TX)
    - 321st Engineer Company (Clearance), in Houston (TX)
    - 808th Engineer Company (Vertical Construction Company — VCC), in Houston (TX)
    - 238th Engineer Detachment (Fire Fighting Team — Fire Truck), in Houston (TX)
    - 337th Engineer Detachment (Fire Fighting Team — Fire Truck), in Houston (TX)
    - 392nd Engineer Detachment (Fire Fighting Team — Fire Truck), in Houston (TX)
    - 449th Engineer Detachment (Fire Fighting Team — Fire Truck), in Houston (TX)
    - 463rd Engineer Detachment (Fire Fighting Team — HQ), in Houston (TX)
    - 547th Engineer Detachment (Fire Fighting Team — Fire Truck), in Houston (TX)
    - 548th Engineer Detachment (Fire Fighting Team — Fire Truck), in Houston (TX)

== Lineage ==
- Constituted 13 February 1951 in the Organized Reserve Corps as Headquarters and Headquarters Company, 420th Engineer Aviation Brigade.
- Activated 15 February 1951 at College Station, Texas.
- (Organized Reserve Corps redesignated 9 July 1952 as the U.S Army Reserve).
- Reorganized and redesignated 30 April 1953 as Headquarters and Headquarters Company, 420th Engineer Brigade.
- Redesignated 8 November 1955 as Headquarters and Headquarters Company, 420th Engineer Aviation Brigade.
- Redesignated 15 January 1957 as Headquarters and Headquarters Company, 420th Engineer Brigade
- Location changed 3 November 1958 to Bryan, Texas.
- Ordered into active military service 7 December 2003 at Bryan, Texas; released from active military service 3 June 2005 and reverted to reserve status.
- Ordered into active military service 15 March 2008 at Bryan, Texas.

== Campaign participation credit ==
- War on Terrorism
- The 980th Engineer Battalion (Combat)(Heavy) spent time in Iraq from 2004 to 2005 (OIF II)
- The 489th Engineer Battalion (Combat)(Mechanized) spent time in Iraq from 2003 to 2004 and in Afghanistan from 2013 - 2014. - A Co, B Co, C Co, D Co, HHC, FSC
- The 341st Engineer Co. spent time in Iraq from 2008 to 2009.
- The 688th Engineer Co. spent time in Iraq from 2008 to 2009.
- The 955th Engineer Co. spent time in Iraq from 2008 to 2009 and in Afghanistan 2013–2014.
- The 277st Engineer Co. spent time in Iraq from 2009 to 2010.
- The 401st Engineer Co. (Multi-Role Bridge) spent time in Iraq from 2009 to 2010. 15 man Forward detachment spent time in Iraq, Syria, and Kuwait 2018–2019 in support of Operation Inherent resolve.
- The 806th Engineer Co. spent time in Afghanistan from 2010 to 2011.
- The 980th Engineer Battalion (Combat)(Heavy) spent time in Afghanistan from 2011 to 2012.
- The 721st Engineer Co. spent time in Afghanistan from 2011- 2012 and in 2018–2019.
- The 321st Engineer Co. spent time in Afghanistan from 2012 to 2013.
- The 704th Engineer Co. spent time in Afghanistan from 2012 to 2013.
- A detachment of the 808th Engineer Co. spent time in Afghanistan from 2013 to 2014.
- The 606 Engineering Facilities Detachment spent time in Afghanistan from 2014 to 2015.
- The 420th Engineer Brigade Headquarters and Headquarters Company deployed to Kuwait as the Theater Engineer Brigade in support of Operation Spartan Shield in March 2017.
- The 961st Engineer BN spent time in Kuwait, Iraq & Syria from 2018 to 2019 in support of Operation Inherent Resolve.
- D Co, 299th Engineer Battalion (Corps)(Combat) deployed for Operations Desert Shield, Desert Storm and Provide Comfort.
- Awarded Multiple Purple Hearts, CAB's, Bronze Stars, NAM's, and many other awards
