= 397th Engineer Battalion (United States) =

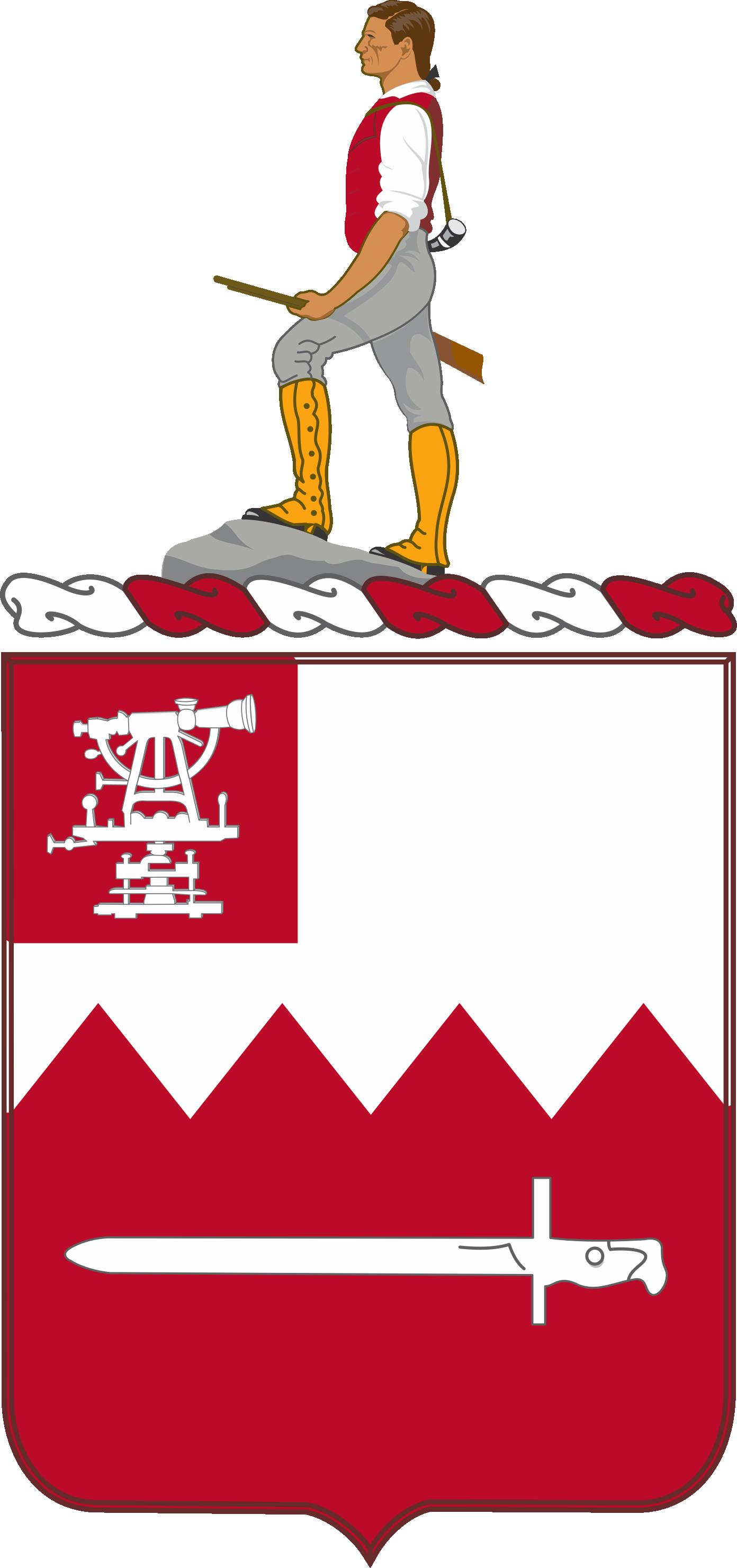
- 397th Engineer Battalion Unit Crest
- Active: 15 August 1942 – Present
- Country: United States
- Allegiance: United States Army
- Branch: US Army Reserve
- Role: Engineers
- Size: Battalion
- Garrison/HQ: Marina, California

Commanders
- Commander: LTC Christopher Smiley
- Command Sergeant Major: CSM Ban Tien

The 397th Engineer Battalion is a multi-role engineer battalion of the United States Army based in Marina, California. Activated 18 May 1959 at Eau Claire, the battalion traces its lineage back to World War II. It is a United States Army Reserve formation and is subordinate to the 301st Maneuver Enhancement Brigade at Joint Base Lewis McCord WA.

== Organization ==
The battalion is a subordinate unit of the 301st Maneuver Enhancement Brigade. As of January 2026 the battalion consists of the following units:

- 397th Engineer Battalion, in Marina (CA)
  - Headquarters and Headquarters Company, 397th Engineer Battalion, in Marina (CA)
  - Forward Support Company, 397th Engineer Battalion, in Marina (CA)
  - 322nd Engineer Company (Vertical Construction Company — VCC), in Sloan (NV)
  - 386th Engineer Company (Clearance), in Sloan (NV)
  - 374th Combat Engineer Company - Infantry (CEC-I), in Concord (CA)
  - 801st Engineer Company (Engineer Construction Company — ECC), in Vallejo (CA)

== Lineage ==
Constituted 5 May 1942 in the Army of the United States as the 2d Battalion, 353d Engineer Regiment

Activated 15 August 1942 at Camp White, Oregon, as the 2d Battalion, 353d Engineer General Service Regiment

Reorganized and redesignated 1 April 1944 as the 1393d Engineer Construction Battalion

Inactivated 28 February 1946 in Japan

Redesignated 6 February 1947 as the 397th Engineer Construction Battalion, and allotted to the Organized Reserves

Activated 19 February 1947 at Milwaukee, Wisconsin

(Organized Reserves redesignated 25 March 1948 as the Organized Reserve Corps; redesignated 9 July 1952 as the Army Reserve)

Inactivated 17 November 1950 at Milwaukee, Wisconsin

Redesignated 27 April 1959 as the 397th Engineer Battalion

Activated 18 May 1959 at Eau Claire, Wisconsin

Elements ordered into active military service in support of the War on Terror:

- 652nd Engineer Company (Multi-Role Bridge), Ellsworth, WI – Operation Iraqi Freedom, 2003–04,
- C Company, Wausau, WI – 2006–07, 428th Engineer Company (Mobility Augmentation), Wausau, WI – 2010–11,
- 113th Engineer Facility Detachment, Milwaukee, WI – 2011–12,
- 871st Engineer Facility Detachment, Fort McCoy, WI – 2012–13
- 372nd Engineer Company (Vertical Construction), Pewaukee, WI – 2013–14

== Honors ==
=== Campaign streamers ===
| Conflict | Streamer | Year(s) |
|---|---|---|
| World War II | Luzon | |

=== Unit Decorations ===
| Award | Year(s) | Notes |
|---|---|---|
| Philippine Presidential Unit Citation | 1944–1945 | For service in the Pacific Theater |
| Valorous Unit Award | 2003–2004 | 652nd Engineer Company, Operation Iraqi Freedom |
