= 863rd Engineer Battalion =

863rd Engineer Battalion (Combat) (Heavy)
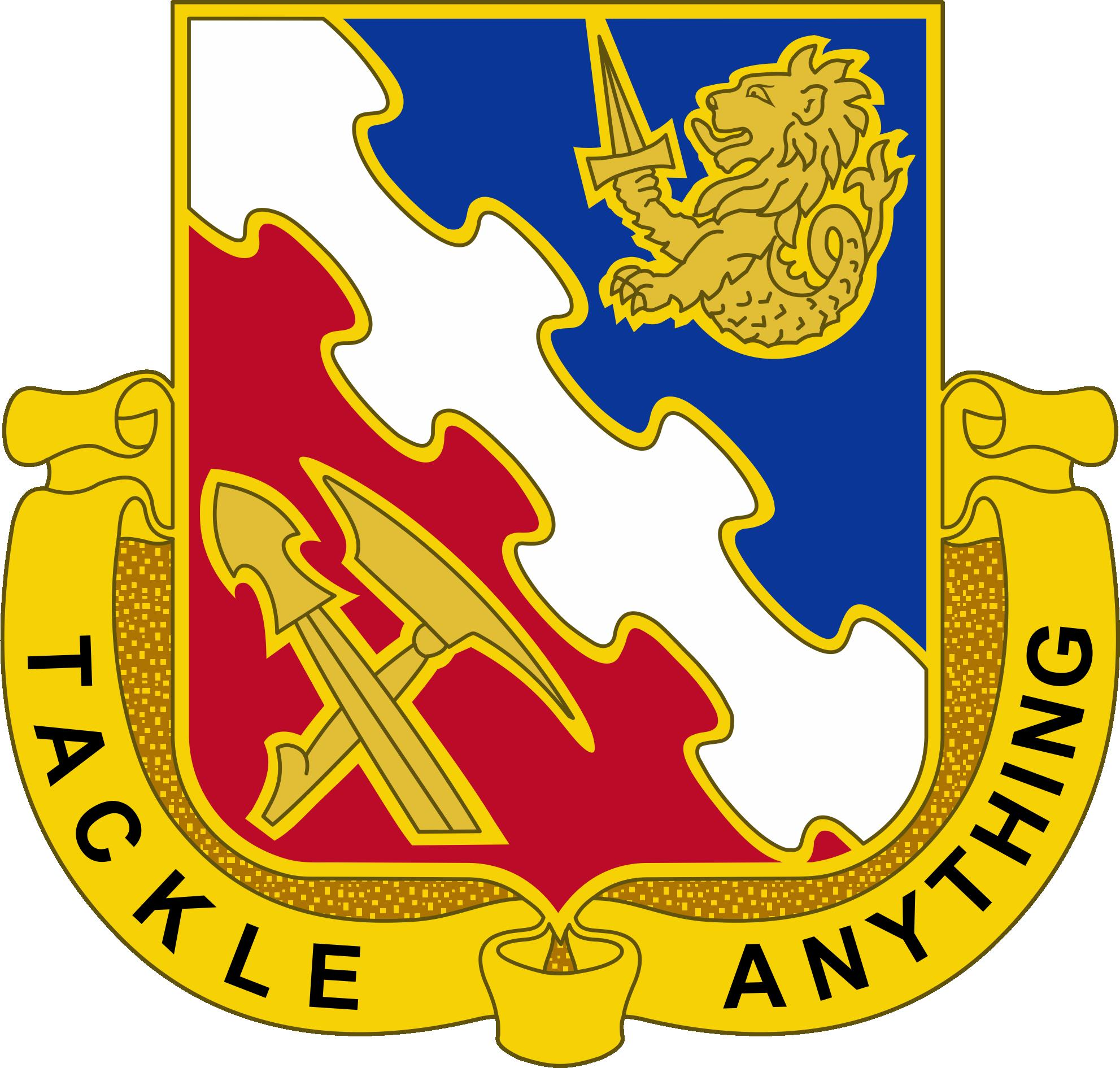
- 863rd Engineer Battalion Distinctive Unit Insignia
- Active: 1942–present
- Country: United States
- Allegiance: United States Army
- Branch: US Army Reserve
- Role: Combat Engineers
- Size: Battalion
- Garrison/HQ: Darien, Illinois

Commanders
- Battalion Commander: LTC Matthew Heid
- Command Sergeant Major: CSM Dustin Gensley

The 863rd Engineer Battalion is an engineer battalion of the United States Army first formed in 1942. The 863rd participated in World War II.

== Organization ==
The battalion is a subordinate unit of the 372nd Engineer Brigade. As of January 2026 the battalion consists of the following units:

- 863rd Engineer Battalion, in Darien (IL)
  - Headquarters and Headquarters Company, 863rd Engineer Battalion, in Darien (IL)
  - Forward Support Company, 863rd Engineer Battalion, in Darien (IL)
  - 317th Engineer Company (Engineer Construction Company — ECC), in Homewood (IL)
  - 372nd Engineer Company (Vertical Construction Company — VCC), in Pewaukee (WI)
  - 469th Engineer Company (Combat Engineer Company — Infantry) (CEC-I), in Machesney Park (IL)
  - 483rd Engineer Platoon (Area Clearance), in Elwood (IL)
  - 485th Engineer Company (Vertical Construction Company — VCC), in Arlington Heights (IL)
  - 609th Engineer Detachment (Concrete Section), in Milwaukee (WI)
  - 966th Engineer Company (Engineer Construction Company — ECC), in Milwaukee (WI)
  - 237th Engineer Detachment (Fire Fighting Team — Fire Truck), in Sturtevant (WI)
  - 336th Engineer Detachment (Fire Fighting Team — Fire Truck), in Sturtevant (WI)
  - 482nd Engineer Detachment (Fire Fighting Team — HQ), in Sturtevant (WI)
  - 628th Engineer Detachment (Fire Fighting Team — Fire Truck), in Sturtevant (WI)
  - 750th Engineer Detachment (Fire Fighting Team — Fire Truck), in Sturtevant (WI)
  - 923rd Engineer Detachment (Fire Fighting Team — Fire Truck), in Sturtevant (WI)

== Lineage and honors ==
- Constituted 15 July 1942 in the Army of the United States as the 1st Battalion, 922nd Engineer Regiment, Aviation
- Activated 1 August 1942 at Geiger Field, Washington, as the 1st Battalion, 922nd Engineer Aviation Regiment
- Redesignated 1 February 1942 as the 863rd Engineer Aviation Battalion
- Inactivated 15 June 1946 in the Philippine Islands
- Allotted 18 February 1949 to the Organized Reserve Corps
- Activated 24 March 1949 with headquarters at Chicago, Illinois
- (Organized Reserve Corps redesignated 9 July 1952 as the Army Reserve)
- Inactivated 17 January 1955 at Chicago, Illinois
- Redesignated 18 August 1959 as the 863rd Engineer Battalion
- Activated 1 October 1959 with headquarters at Aurora, Illinois

== Campaign participation credit ==
World War II

- New Guinea
- Leyte
- Luzon

Operation Enduring Freedom
Operation Inherent Resolve

== Decorations ==
- Philippine Presidential Unit Citation, Streamer embroidered 17 October 1944 to 4 July 1945
- Valorous Unit Award, Medal awarded to 863rd Engineer Battalion (Combat) (Heavy) for its performance in support of Task Force Strike, 2nd BCT, 101st Airborne Division throughout RC-South, Afghanistan, Operation Enduring Freedom; from 20 June 2010 to 15 April 2011.

== Controversy ==
Operation Enduring Freedom

- Controversy briefly erupted shortly after ending operations in Afghanistan (August 2011) when the 863rd Engineer Battalion was accused of abandoning one of its attached subordinate units to adverse weather conditions during the demobilization process in order to allow its organic personnel not to be inconvenienced by Hurricane Irene.
