= United States Army Corps of Engineers =

Military engineering branch of the U.S. Army

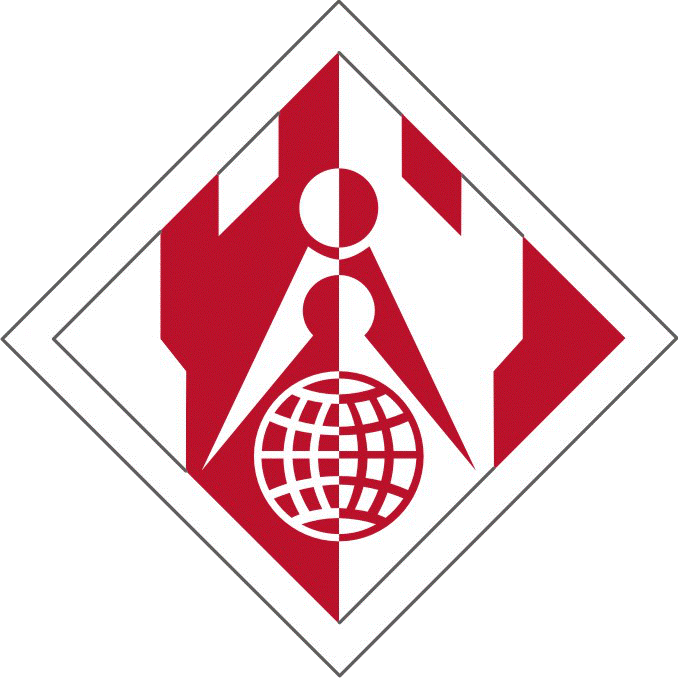
- Shoulder sleeve insignia
- Active: 1775–1783; 1802–present
- Country: United States
- Branch: Army
- Type: Direct Reporting Unit
- Role: Military engineering
- Size: Corps
- Part of: Department of the Army
- Headquarters: Washington, D.C.
- Mottos: French: Essayons, lit. 'Let Us Try'
- Colors: Scarlet and white
- Anniversaries: June 16 (Organization Day)
- Wars: Revolutionary War; War of 1812; Mexican War; Civil War; Indian Wars; War with Spain; China Relief Expedition; Philippine Insurrection; Mexican Expedition; World War I; World War II; Korean War; Vietnam; Southwest Asia; Kosovo; War on Terrorism
- Website: usace.army.mil

Commanders
- Commander and Chief of Engineers: Lt. Gen. William H. Graham Jr.
- Deputy Commander: Maj. Gen. Kimberly Colloton

Insignia
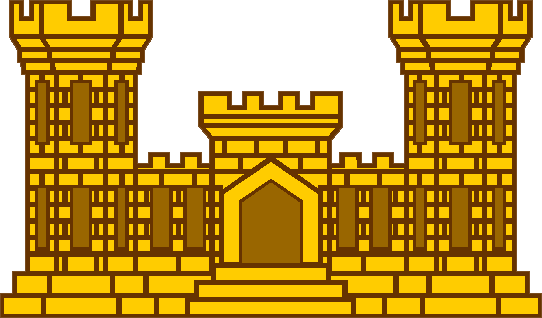
- Branch insignia

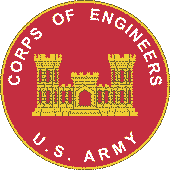
- Branch plaque

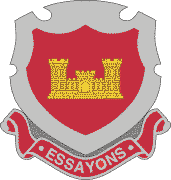
- Regimental insignia

- Coat of arms

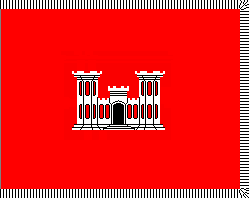
- Flag

- Logo

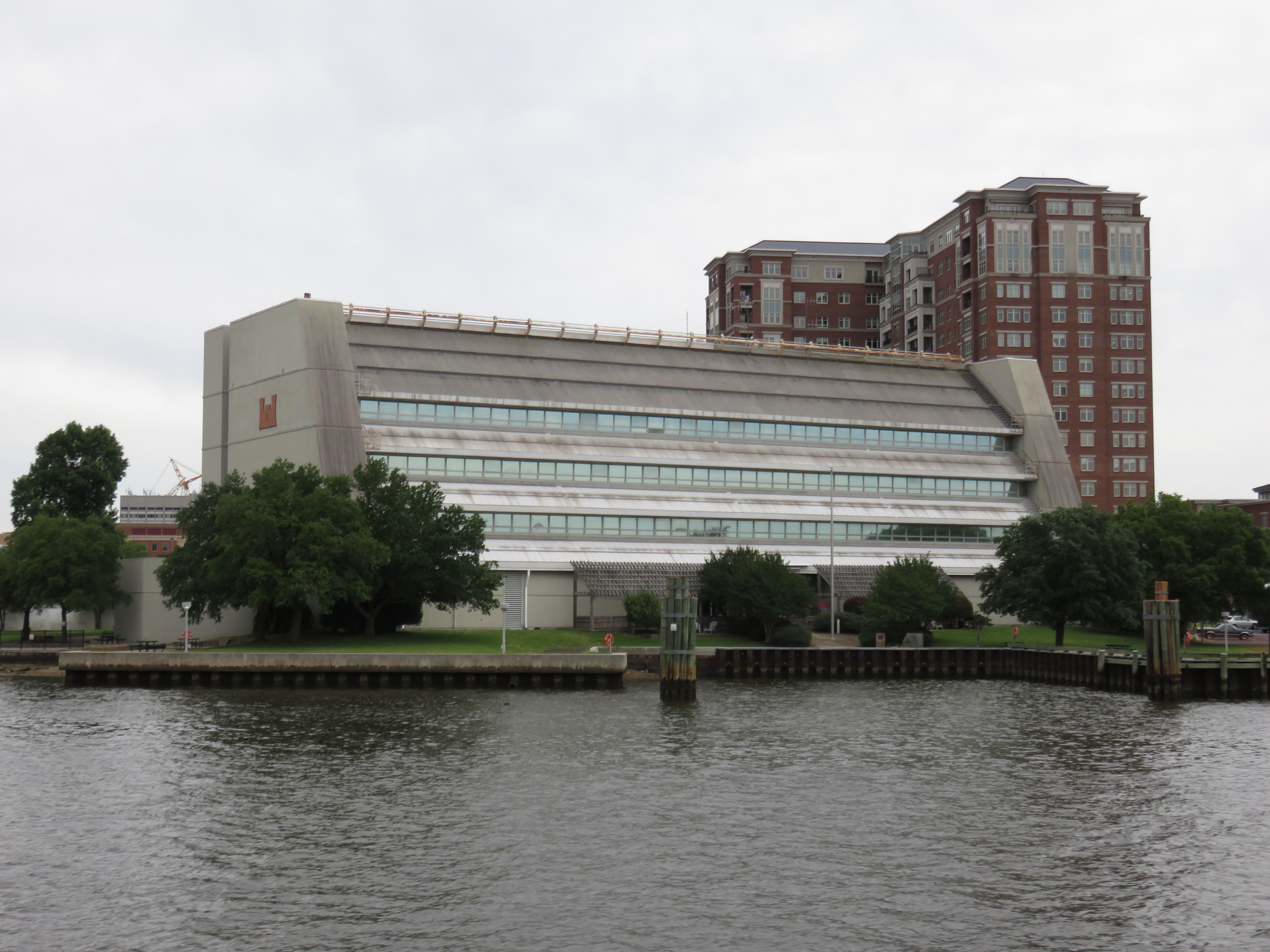
The headquarters of the U.S. Army Corps of Engineers Norfolk District in Norfolk, Virginia

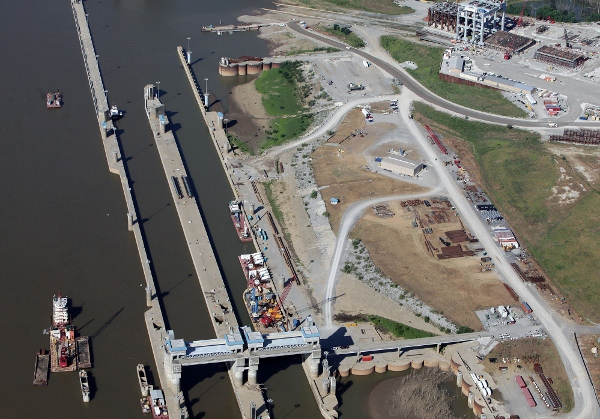
Olmsted Locks and Dam on the Ohio River in Olmsted, Illinois, was under construction for over 20 years under the U.S. Army Corps of Engineers' watch; it opened in 2018.

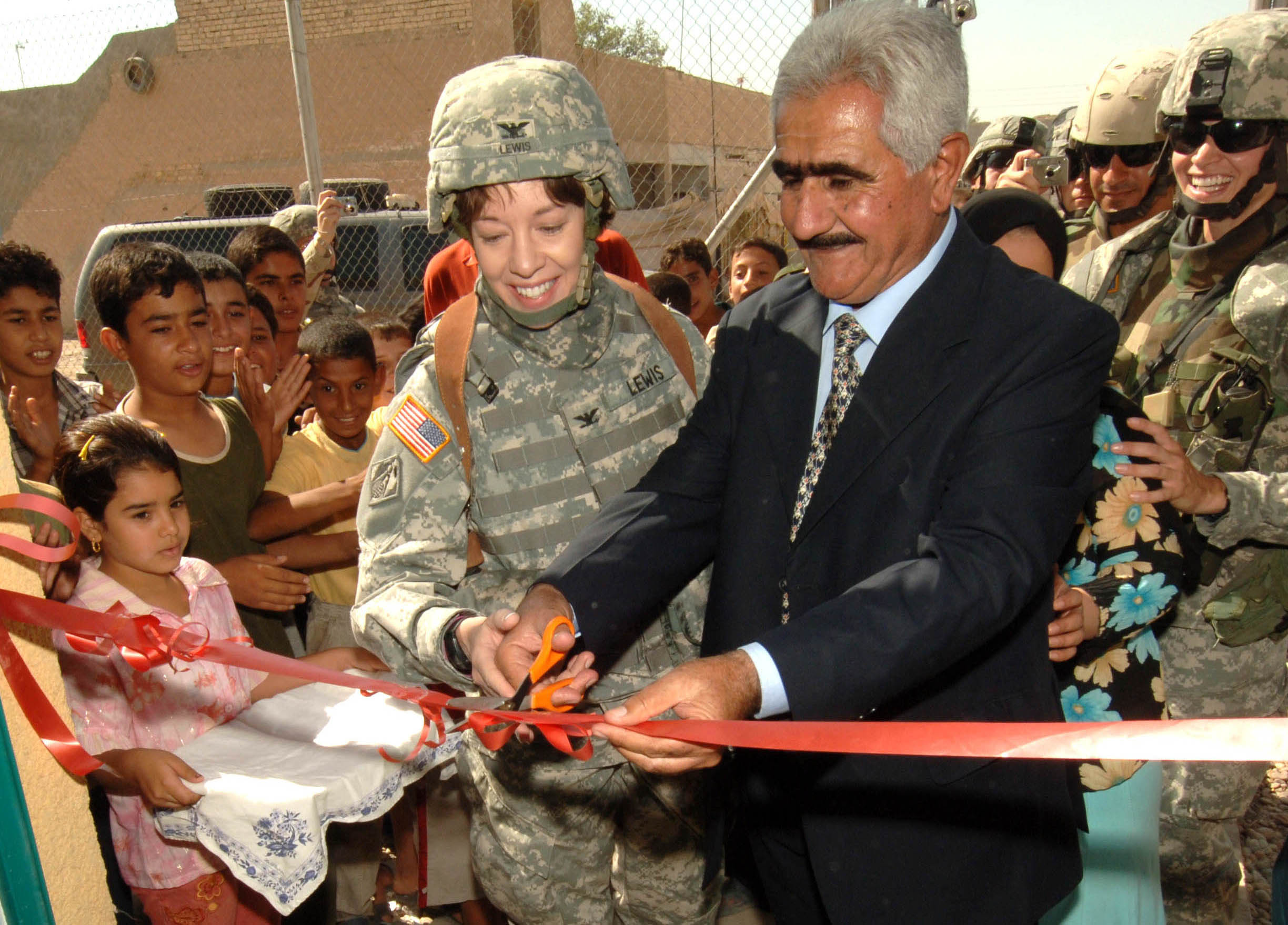
Celebratory proceedings in 2006 for the opening of a new women's center in Iraq, constructed by the Corps of Engineers

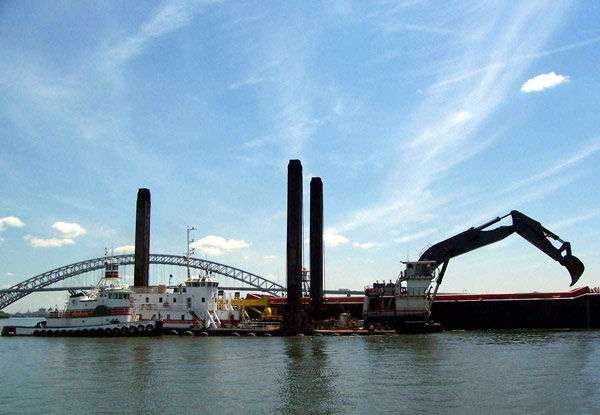
U.S. Army Corps of Engineers-chartered dredge Tauracavor in New York Harbor

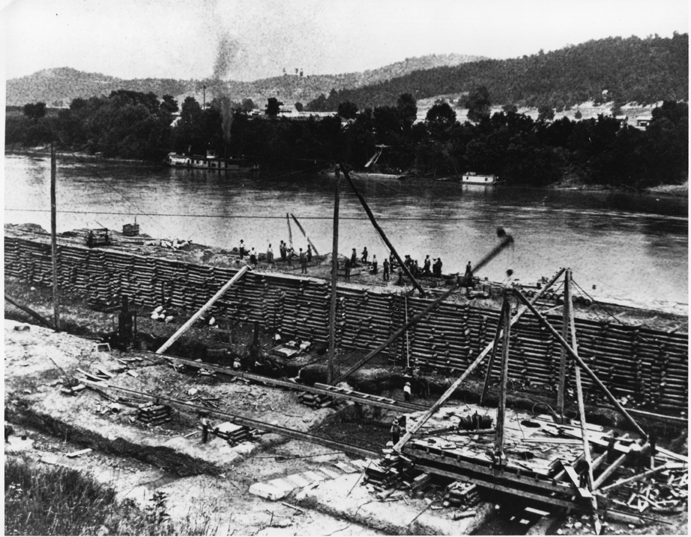
Mississippi River improvements made by the Corps of Engineers in 1890

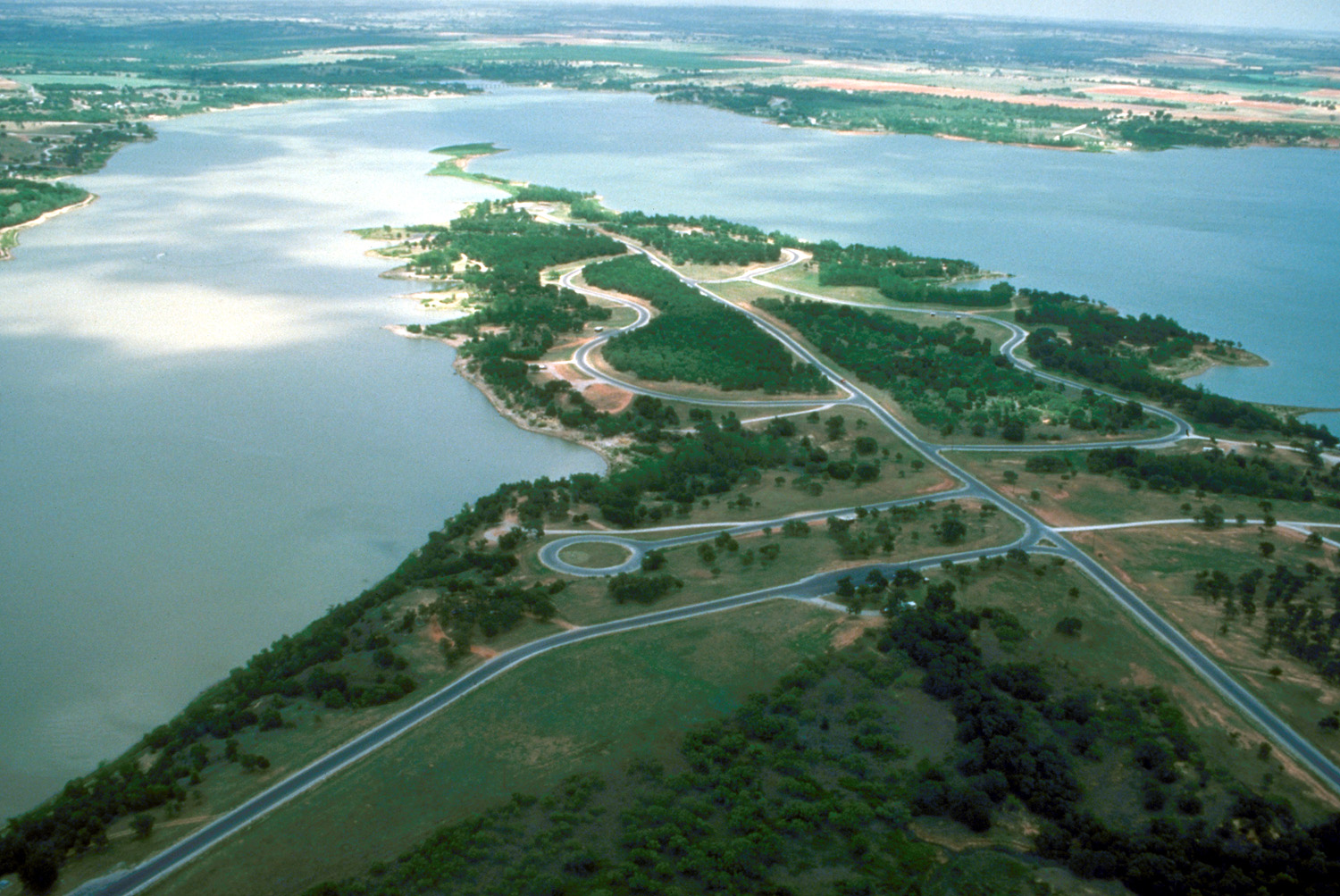
Proctor Lake in Texas, constructed by the Corps of Engineers to provide flood control, drinking water, and recreation

The United States Army Corps of Engineers (USACE) is the military engineering branch of the United States Army. A Direct Reporting Unit (DRU), it has three primary mission areas: Engineer Regiment, military construction, and civil works. USACE has 37,000 civilian and military personnel, making it one of the world's largest public engineering, design, and construction management agencies. The USACE workforce is approximately 97% civilian and 3% active duty military. The civilian workforce is mainly located in the United States, Europe, and in select Middle East office locations. Civilians do not function as active duty military and are not required to be in active war and combat zones; however, volunteer (with pay) opportunities do exist for civilians to do so.

The day-to-day activities of the three mission areas are administered by a lieutenant general known as the chief of engineers/commanding general. The chief of engineers commands the Engineer Regiment, comprising combat engineer, rescue, construction, dive, and other specialty units, and answers directly to the chief of staff of the Army. Combat engineers, sometimes called sappers, form an integral part of the Army's combined arms team and are found in all Army service components: Regular Army, National Guard, and Army Reserve. Their duties are to breach obstacles; construct fighting positions, fixed/floating bridges, and obstacles and defensive positions; place and detonate explosives; conduct route clearance operations; emplace and detect landmines; and fight as provisional infantry when required. For the military construction mission, the chief of engineers is directed and supervised by the Assistant Secretary of the Army for installations, environment, and energy, whom the President appoints and the Senate confirms. Military construction relates to construction on military bases and worldwide installations.

On 16 June 1775, the Continental Congress, gathered in Philadelphia, granted authority for the creation of a "chief engineer for the Army". Congress authorized a corps of engineers for the United States on 1 March 1779. The corps as it is known today came into being on 16 March 1802, when the president was authorized to "organize and establish a Corps of Engineers ... that the said Corps ... shall be stationed at West Point in the State of New York and shall constitute a Military Academy." A Corps of Topographical Engineers, authorized on 4 July 1838, merged with the Corps of Engineers in March 1863.

Civil works are managed and supervised by the assistant secretary of the Army. Army civil works include three U.S. Congress-authorized business lines: navigation, flood and storm damage protection, and aquatic ecosystem restoration. Civil works is also tasked with administering the Clean Water Act Section 404 program, including recreation, hydropower, and water supply at USACE flood control reservoirs, and environmental infrastructure. The civil works staff oversee construction, operation, and maintenance of dams, canals and flood protection in the U.S., as well as a wide range of public works throughout the world. Some of its dams, reservoirs, and flood control projects also serve as public outdoor recreation facilities. Its hydroelectric projects provide 24% of U.S. hydropower capacity.

The Corps of Engineers is headquartered in Washington, D.C., and has a budget of $7.8 billion (FY2021).

The corps's mission is to "deliver vital public and military engineering services; partnering in peace and war to strengthen our nation's security, energize the economy and reduce risks from disasters."

Its most visible civil works missions include:

- Planning, designing, building, and operating locks and dams. Other civil engineering projects include flood control, beach nourishment, and dredging for waterway navigation.
- Design and construction of flood protection systems through various federal mandates.
- Design and construction management of military facilities for the Army, Air Force, Army Reserve, and Air Force Reserve as well as other Department of Defense and federal government agencies.
- Environmental regulation and ecosystem restoration.

== History ==
=== 18th century ===
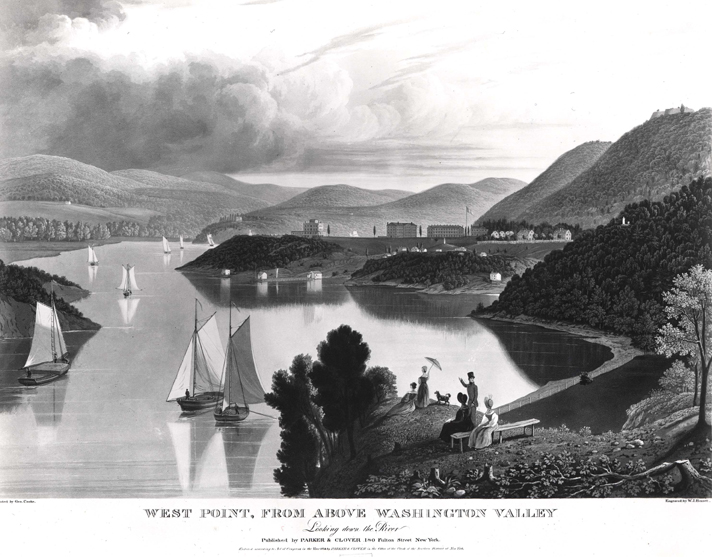
Plan of the United States Military Academy in West Point, New York

The history of United States Army Corps of Engineers can be traced back to the American Revolution. On 16 June 1775, the Continental Congress organized the Corps of Engineers, whose initial staff included a chief engineer and two assistants. Colonel Richard Gridley became General George Washington's first chief engineer. One of his first tasks was to build fortifications near Boston at Bunker Hill. The Continental Congress recognized the need for engineers trained in military fortifications and asked the government of King Louis XVI of France for assistance. Many of the early engineers in the Continental Army were former French officers.

Louis Lebègue Duportail, a lieutenant colonel in the French Royal Corps of Engineers, was secretly sent to North America in March 1777 to serve in George Washington's Continental Army. In July 1777 he was appointed colonel and commander of all engineers in the Continental Army and, on 17 November 1777, he was promoted to brigadier general. When the Continental Congress created a separate Corps of Engineers in May 1779, Duportail was appointed as its commander. In late 1781 he directed the construction of the allied U.S.–French siege works at the Battle of Yorktown.

On 26 February 1783, the corps was disbanded. It was re-established during the presidency of George Washington.

From 1794 to 1802, the engineers were combined with the artillery as the Corps of Artillerists and Engineers.

=== 19th century ===
The Corps of Engineers, as it is known today, was established on 16 March 1802, when President Thomas Jefferson signed the Military Peace Establishment Act, whose aim was to "organize and establish a Corps of Engineers ... that the said Corps ... shall be stationed at West Point in the State of New York and shall constitute a military academy." Until 1866, the superintendent of the United States Military Academy was always an Engineer Officer.

The General Survey Act of 1824 authorized the use of Army engineers to survey road and canal routes for the growing nation. That same year, Congress passed an "Act to Improve the Navigation of the Ohio and Mississippi Rivers" and to remove sand bars on the Ohio and "planters, sawyers, or snags" (trees fixed in the riverbed) on the Mississippi, for which the Corps of Engineers was identified as the responsible agency.

Separately authorized on 4 July 1838, the Corps of Topographical Engineers consisted only of officers and was used for mapping and the design and construction of federal civil works and other coastal fortifications and navigational routes. It was merged with the Corps of Engineers on 31 March 1863, at which point the Corps of Engineers also assumed the Lakes Survey District mission for the Great Lakes.

In 1841, Congress created the Lake Survey. The survey, based in Detroit, Michigan, was charged with conducting a hydrographical survey of the Northern and Northwestern lakes and preparing and publishing nautical charts and other navigation aids. The Lake Survey published its first charts in 1852.

In the mid-19th century, Corps of Engineers' officers ran Lighthouse Districts in tandem with U.S. Naval officers.

==== Civil War ====
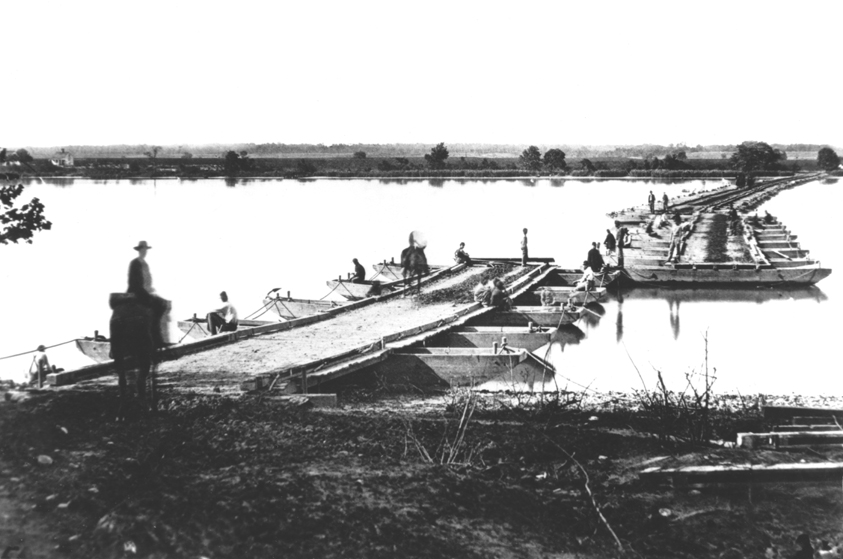
Pontoon bridge across the James River in Virginia in 1864

The Army Corps of Engineers played a significant role in the American Civil War. Many of the men who would serve in the top leadership in this organization were West Point graduates. Several rose to military fame and power during the Civil War. Some examples include Union generals George McClellan, Henry Halleck, and George Meade; and Confederate generals Robert E. Lee, Joseph Johnston, and P.G.T. Beauregard. The versatility of officers in the Army Corps of Engineers contributed to the success of numerous missions throughout the Civil War. They were responsible for building pontoon and railroad bridges, forts and batteries, destroying enemy supply lines (including railroads), and constructing roads for the movement of troops and supplies. Both sides recognized the crucial work of engineers. On 6 March 1861, after the South had seceded from the Union, its legislature passed an act to create a Confederate Corps of Engineers.

The South was initially at a disadvantage in engineering expertise; of the initial 65 cadets who resigned from West Point to accept positions with the Confederate Army, only seven were placed in the Corps of Engineers. The Confederate Congress passed legislation that authorized a company of engineers for every division in the field; by 1865, the CSA had more engineer officers serving in the field of action than the Union Army.

One of the main projects for the Army Corps of Engineers was constructing railroads and bridges. Union forces took advantage of such Confederate infrastructure because railroads and bridges provided access to resources and industry. The Confederate engineers, using slave labor, built fortifications that were used both offensively and defensively, along with trenches that made them harder to penetrate. This method of building trenches was known as the zigzag pattern.

=== 20th century ===
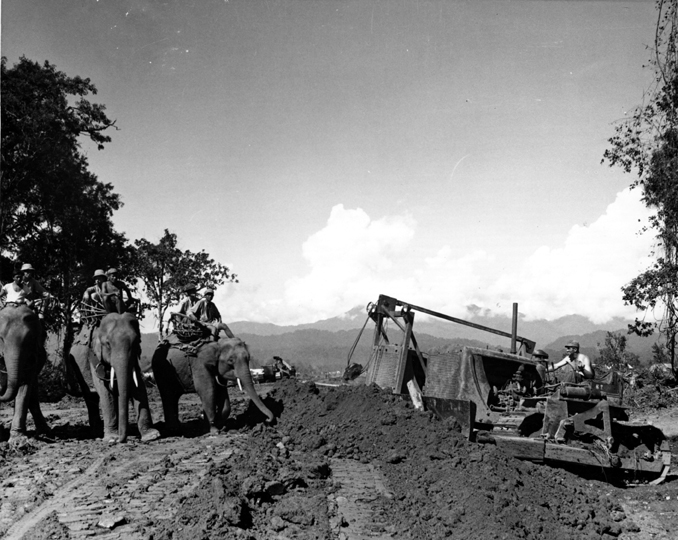
A bulldozer operated by Sergeant C. G. McCutcheon of the 1304th Engineer Construction Battalion on Ledo Road in Burma in 1944

The National Defense Act of 1916 authorized a reserve corps in the Army, and the Engineer Officers' Reserve Corps and the Engineer Enlisted Reserve Corps became one of the branches. Some of these personnel were called into active service for World War I. An example of this was the 510th and 511th Engineer Service Battalions. These two military units were organized at Camp Lee, Va, and consisted of black soldiers (draftees), white officers, and non-commissioned officers.

From the beginning, many politicians wanted the Corps of Engineers to contribute to both military construction and civil works. Assigned the military construction mission on 1 December 1941, after the Quartermaster Department struggled with the expanding mission, the Corps built facilities at home and abroad to support the U.S. Army and Air Force. During World War II the USACE program expanded to more than 27,000 military and industrial projects in a $15.3 billion mobilization effort. Included were aircraft, tank assembly, and ammunition plants; camps for 5.3 million soldiers; depots, ports, and hospitals; and the rapid construction of such landmark projects such as the Manhattan Project at Los Alamos, Hanford and Oak Ridge among other places, and the Pentagon, the Department of Defense headquarters across the Potomac from Washington, DC.

In civilian projects, the Corps of Engineers became the lead federal navigation and flood control agency. Congress significantly expanded its civil works activities, becoming a major provider of hydroelectric energy and the country's leading provider of recreation. Its role in responding to natural disasters also grew dramatically, especially following the devastating Mississippi Flood of 1927. In the late 1960s, the agency became a leading environmental preservation and restoration agency.

In 1944, specially trained army combat engineers were assigned to blow up underwater obstacles and clear defended ports during the invasion of Normandy. During World War II, the Army Corps of Engineers in the European Theater of Operations was responsible for building numerous bridges, including the first and longest floating tactical bridge across the Rhine at Remagen, and building or maintaining roads vital to the Allied advance across Europe into the heart of Germany. In the Pacific theater, the "Pioneer troops" were formed, a hand-selected unit of volunteer Army combat engineers trained in jungle warfare, knife fighting, and unarmed jujitsu (hand-to-hand combat) techniques. Working in camouflage, the Pioneers cleared jungle, prepared routes of advance and established bridgeheads for the infantry, as well as demolishing enemy installations.

Five commanding generals (chiefs of staff after the 1903 reorganization) of the United States Army held engineer commissions early in their careers. All transferred to other branches before being promoted to the top position. They were Alexander Macomb, George B. McClellan, Henry W. Halleck, Douglas MacArthur, and Maxwell D. Taylor.

=== Notable dates and projects ===
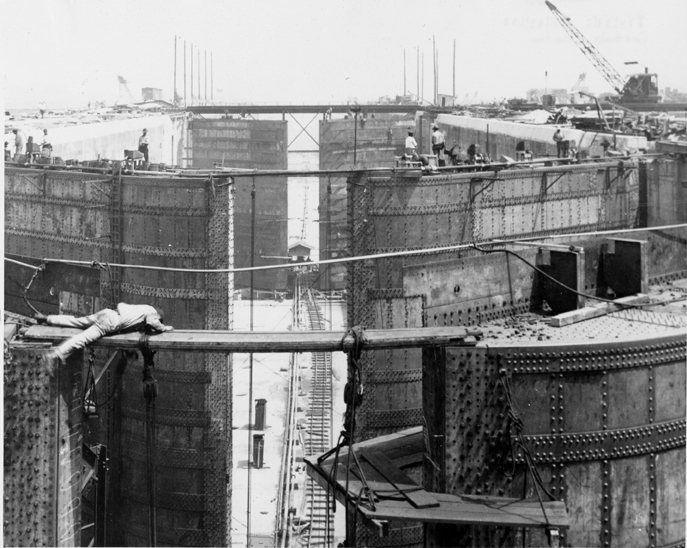
Construction on the Gatun Lock at the Panama Canal on 12 March 1912

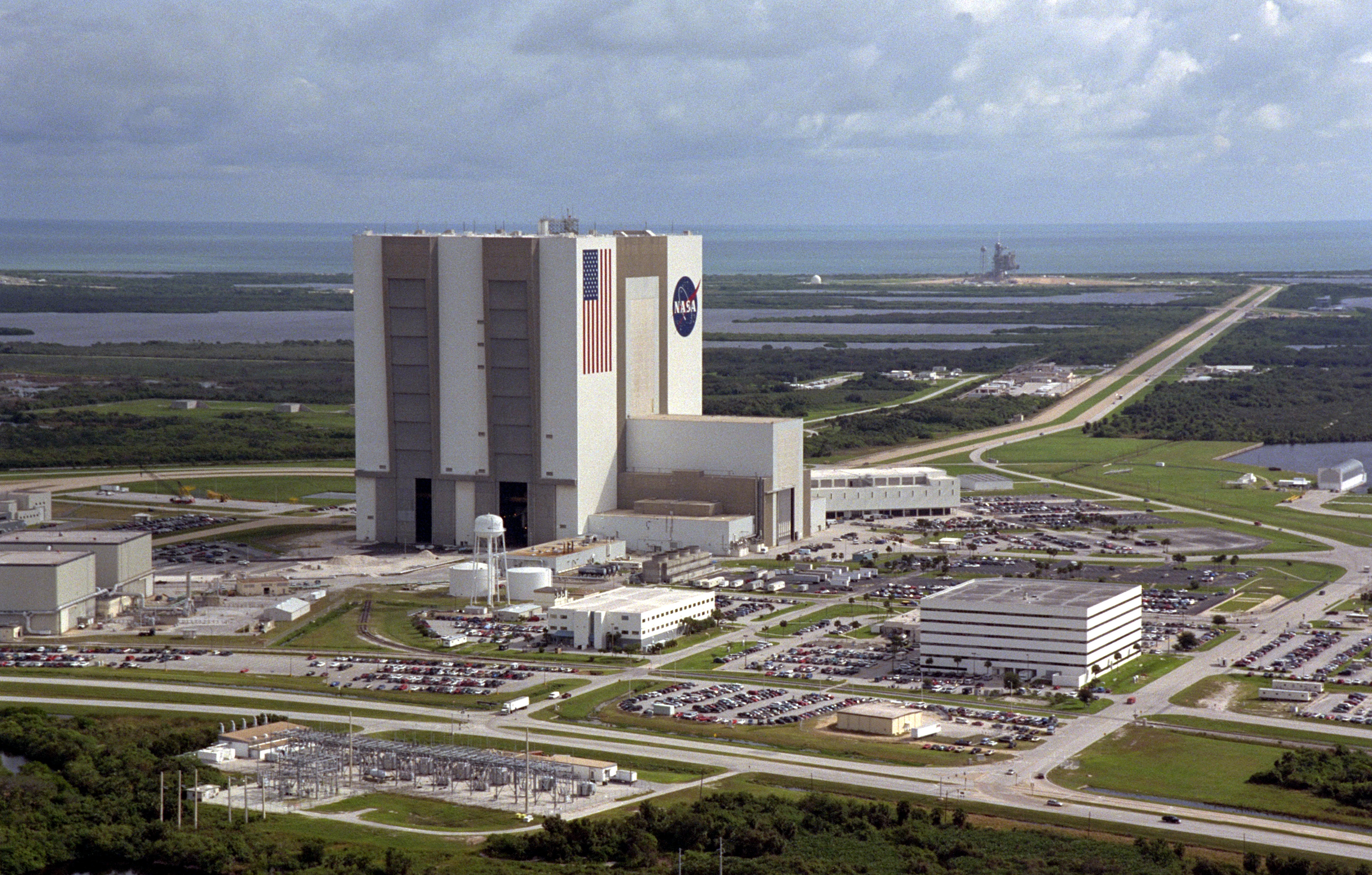
Kennedy Space Center in Florida

- The General Survey Act of 1824 authorized use of army engineers to survey roads and canals. The next month, an act to improve navigation on the Ohio and Mississippi rivers initiated the Corps of Engineers' permanent civil works construction mission. Although the 1824 act to improve the Mississippi and Ohio rivers is often called the first rivers and harbors legislation, the act passed in 1826 was the first to combine authorizations for both surveys and projects, thereby establishing a pattern that continues to the present day.
- Survey and construction of the National Road until Federal funds were withdrawn (1838)
- The 555 ft 5 1/8 in (169.29 m) tall Washington Monument, completed under the direction and command of Lieutenant Colonel Thomas Lincoln Casey, 1884
- Construction of Fort Baldwin as part of the Harbor Defenses of Portland during the Endicott Period (1905-1912)
- Panama Canal, completed under supervision of Army Engineer officers, 1914
- Flood Control Act of 1936 made flood control a federal policy and officially recognized the Corps of Engineers as the major federal flood control agency
- Bonneville Dam, completed in 1937
- Flood Control Act of 1941, which channelized the Los Angeles River and parts of the Santa Ana River
- USACE took over all real estate acquisition, construction, and maintenance for army facilities, 1941
- There was no road between Costa Rica and Panama until the Corps began one in 1941–1943. The concern was access to the Panama Canal during wartime.
- The Manhattan Project (1942–1946)
- Planning and construction of the Pentagon, completed in 1943 just 16 months after groundbreaking
- Comprehensive Everglades Restoration Plan, first authorized by congress in 1948
- USACE began construction support for NASA leading to major activities at the Manned Spacecraft Center and Kennedy Space Center, 1961
- King Khalid Military City 1973–1987
- The Water Resources Development Act of 1986 (WRDA 86) brought major change in financing by requiring non-federal contributions toward most federal water resource projects
- Cross Florida Barge Canal
- Tennessee-Tombigbee Waterway

Occasional civil disasters, including the Great Mississippi Flood of 1927, resulted in greater responsibilities for the Corps of Engineers. The aftermath of Hurricane Katrina in New Orleans and the collapse of the Francis Scott Key Bridge in Baltimore provide other examples of this.

== Organization ==
=== Headquarters ===
The chief of engineers and commanding general (lt. general) of the U.S. Army Corps of Engineers has three mission areas: combat engineers, military construction, and civil works. For each mission area, the chief of engineers/commanding general is supervised by a different person. For civil works, the commanding general is supervised by the civilian assistant secretary of the Army (Civil Works). Three deputy commanding generals (major generals) report to the chief of engineers, who have the following titles: Deputy Commanding General, Deputy Commanding General for Civil and Emergency Operation, and Deputy Commanding General for Military and International Operations. The Corps of Engineers headquarters is located in Washington, D.C. Headquarters staff are responsible for Corps of Engineers policy and they plan the future direction of all other USACE organizations. Headquarters comprises the executive office and 17 staff principals. USACE has two civilian directors who head up military and civil works programs in concert with their respective DCG for the mission area.

=== Divisions and districts ===
The U.S. Army Corps of Engineers is organized geographically into eight permanent divisions, one provisional division, one provisional district, and one research command reporting directly to the HQ. Within each division, there are several districts. Districts are defined by watershed boundaries for civil works projects and by political boundaries for military projects.

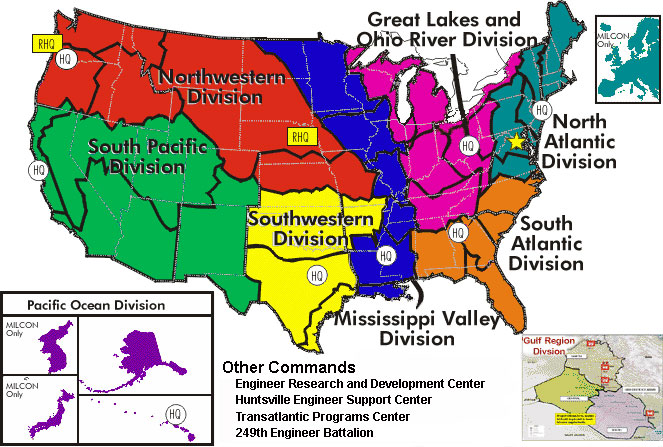
Map of U.S. Army Corps of Engineers Civil Engineer divisions and districts

- Great Lakes and Ohio River Division (LRD), located in Cincinnati. Reaches from the St Lawrence Seaway, across the Great Lakes, down the Ohio River Valley to the Tennessee and Cumberland rivers. Covers 355,300 square miles (920,000 km^{2}), parts of 17 states. Serves 56 million people. Its seven districts are located in Buffalo, Chicago, Detroit, Louisville, Nashville, Pittsburgh, and Huntington, West Virginia. The division commander serves on two national and international decision-making bodies: co-chair of the Lake Superior, Niagara, and Ontario/St Lawrence Seaway boards of control; and the Mississippi River Commission.
- Mississippi Valley Division (MVD), located in Vicksburg, Mississippi. Reaches from Canada to the Gulf of Mexico. Covers 370,000 square miles (960,000 km^{2}), and portions of 12 states bordering the Mississippi River. Serves 28 million people. Its six districts are located in St. Paul, Minnesota, Rock Island, Illinois, St. Louis, Memphis, Vicksburg, and New Orleans. MVD serves as headquarters for the Mississippi River Commission.
- North Atlantic Division (NAD), headquartered at Fort Hamilton in Brooklyn, New York. Reaches from Maine to Virginia, including the District of Columbia, with an overseas mission to provide engineering, construction, and project management services to the U.S. European Command and U.S. Africa Command. Serves 62 million people. Its six districts are located in New York City, Philadelphia, Baltimore, Norfolk, Concord, Massachusetts, and Wiesbaden, Germany. NAD has the largest Superfund program in USACE with 60% of the funding. NAD's Europe District has done work in dozens of countries and has offices in Germany, Belgium, Italy, Turkey, Georgia, Romania, Bulgaria, Israel, Spain, and soon Botswana.
- Northwestern Division (NWD), located in Portland, Oregon. Reaches from Canada to California, and from the Pacific Ocean to Missouri. Covers nearly 1,000,000 square miles (2,600,000 km^{2}) in all or parts of 14 states. Its five districts are located in Omaha, Portland, Seattle, Kansas City, and Walla Walla. NWD has 35% of the total Corps of Engineers' water storage capacity and 75% of the total hydroelectric capacity.
- Pacific Ocean Division (POD), located at Fort Shafter, Hawaii. Reaches across 12 million square miles of the Pacific Ocean from the Arctic Circle to American Samoa below the equator and across the International Date Line, and into Asia. Includes the territories of Guam, American Samoa and the Commonwealth of the Northern Mariana Islands as well as the Freely Associated States including the Republic of Palau, Federated States of Micronesia and the Republic of the Marshall Islands. Its four districts are located in Japan; Seoul, South Korea; Anchorage, Alaska; and Honolulu. Unlike other military work, POD designs and builds for all of the military services — Army, Navy, Air Force, Marines — in Japan, Korea, and Kwajalein Atoll.
- South Atlantic Division (SAD), located in Atlanta. Reaches from North Carolina to Alabama as well as the Caribbean, and Central and South America. Covers all or parts of six states. Its five districts are located in Wilmington, North Carolina, Charleston, South Carolina, Savannah, Jacksonville, and Mobile. One-third of the stateside Army and one-fifth of the stateside Air Force are located within the division boundaries. The largest single environmental restoration project in the world — the Everglades Restoration — is managed by SAD.
- South Pacific Division (SPD), located in San Francisco. Reaches from California to Colorado and New Mexico. Covers all or parts of seven states. Its four districts are located in Albuquerque, Los Angeles, Sacramento, and San Francisco. Its region is host to 18 of the 25 fastest-growing metropolitan areas in the nation.
- Southwestern Division (SWD), located in Dallas. Reaches from Mexico to Kansas. Covers all or part of seven states. Its four districts are located in Little Rock, Tulsa, Galveston, and Fort Worth. SWD's recreation areas are the most visited in USACE with more than 11,400 miles (18,300 km) of shoreline and 1,172 recreation sites.
- Transatlantic Division (TAD), located in Winchester, Virginia. Supports Federal programs and policies overseas. Consists of the Gulf Region District, the Afghanistan Engineer District South, the Afghanistan Engineer District North, the Middle East District, the USACE Deployment Center and the TAD G2 Intelligence Fusion Center. TAD oversees thousands of projects overseas. TAD overseas locations are staffed primarily by civilian volunteers from throughout USACE. The Corps of Engineers built much of Afghanistan's original Ring Road in the early 1960s and returned in 2002. Supports the full spectrum of regional support, including the Afghan National Security Forces, U.S. and Coalition Forces, Counter Narcotics and Border Management, Strategic Reconstruction support to USAID, and the Commander's Emergency Response Program.

=== The Engineer Regiment ===
U.S. Army engineer units outside of USACE Districts and not listed below fall under the Engineer Regiment of the U.S. Army Corps of Engineers, which comprises the majority of Army engineer soldiers. The Regiment includes combat engineers, whose duties are to breach obstacles; construct fighting positions, fixed/floating bridges, and obstacles and defensive positions; place and detonate explosives; conduct route clearance operations; emplace and detect landmines; and fight as provisional infantry when required. It also includes support engineers, who are more focused on construction and sustainment. Headquartered at Fort Leonard Wood, MO, the Engineer Regiment is commanded by the Engineer Commandant, currently a position filled by an Army brigadier general.

The Engineer Regiment includes the U.S. Army Engineer School (USAES) which publishes its mission as: Generate the military engineer capabilities the Army needs: training and certifying Soldiers with the right knowledge, skills, and critical thinking; growing and educating professional leaders; organizing and equipping units; establishing a doctrinal framework for employing capabilities; and remaining an adaptive institution in order to provide Commanders with the freedom of action they need to successfully execute Unified Land Operations.

=== Other USACE organizations ===
There are several other organizations within the Corps of Engineers:

- Engineer Research and Development Center (ERDC) — the Corps of Engineers research and development command. ERDC comprises seven laboratories. (see research below)
- U.S. Army Engineering and Support Center (CEHNC) — provides engineering and technical services, program and project management, construction management, and innovative contracting initiatives, for programs that are national or broad in scope or not normally provided by other Corps of Engineers elements
- Finance Center, U.S. Army Corps of Engineers (CEFC) — supports the operating finance and accounting functions throughout the Corps of Engineers
- Humphreys Engineer Center Support Activity (HECSA) — provides administrative and operational support for Headquarters, U.S. Army Corps of Engineers and various field offices.
- Army Geospatial Center (AGC) — provides geospatial information, standards, systems, support, and services across the Army and the Department of Defense.
- Marine Design Center (CEMDC) — provides total project management including planning, engineering, and shipbuilding contract management in support of USACE, Army, and national water resource projects in peacetime, and augments the military construction capacity in time of national emergency or mobilization
- Institute for Water Resources (IWR) — supports the Civil Works Directorate and other Corps of Engineers commands by developing and applying new planning evaluation methods, policies and data in anticipation of changing water resources management conditions.
- USACE Logistics Activity (ULA)- Provides logistics support to the Corps of Engineers including supply, maintenance, readiness, materiel, transportation, travel, aviation, facility management, integrated logistics support, management controls, and strategic planning.
- Enterprise Infrastructure Services (CEEIS) — designs information technology standards for the Corps, including automation, communications, management, visual information, printing, records management, and information assurance. CEEIS outsources the maintenance of its IT services, forming the Army Corps of Engineers Information Technology (ACE-IT). ACE-IT is made up of both civilian government employees and contractors.
- Deployable Tactical Operations System (DTOS) — provides mobile command and control platforms in support of the quick ramp-up of initial emergency response missions for the Corps. DTOS is a system designed to respond to District, Division, National, and International events.
- Until 2001 local Directorates of Engineering and Housing (DEH), being constituents of the USACE, had been responsible for the housing, infrastructure and related tasks as environmental protection, garbage removal and special fire departments or fire alarm coordination centers in the garrisons of the U.S. Army abroad as in Europe (e.g. Germany, as in Berlin, Wiesbaden, Karlsruhe etc.) Subsequently, a similar structure called DPWs (Directorates of Public Works), subordinate to the United States Army Installation Management Command, assumed the tasks formerly done by the DEHs.

=== Directly reporting military units ===
- 249th Engineer Battalion (Prime Power) — generates and distributes prime electrical power in support of fighting wars, disaster relief, stability and support operations as well as provides advice and technical assistance in all aspects of electrical power and distribution systems.
- 911th Engineer Company — (formerly the MDW Engineer Company) provides specialized technical search and rescue support for the Washington, D.C. metropolitan area; it is also a vital support member of the Joint Force Headquarters National Capital Region, which is charged with the homeland security of the United States capital region.
- 412th Theater Engineer Command, U.S. Army Reserve, located in Vicksburg, MS.
- 416th Theater Engineer Command, U.S. Army Reserve, located in Darien, IL.

== Mission areas ==
=== Warfighting ===
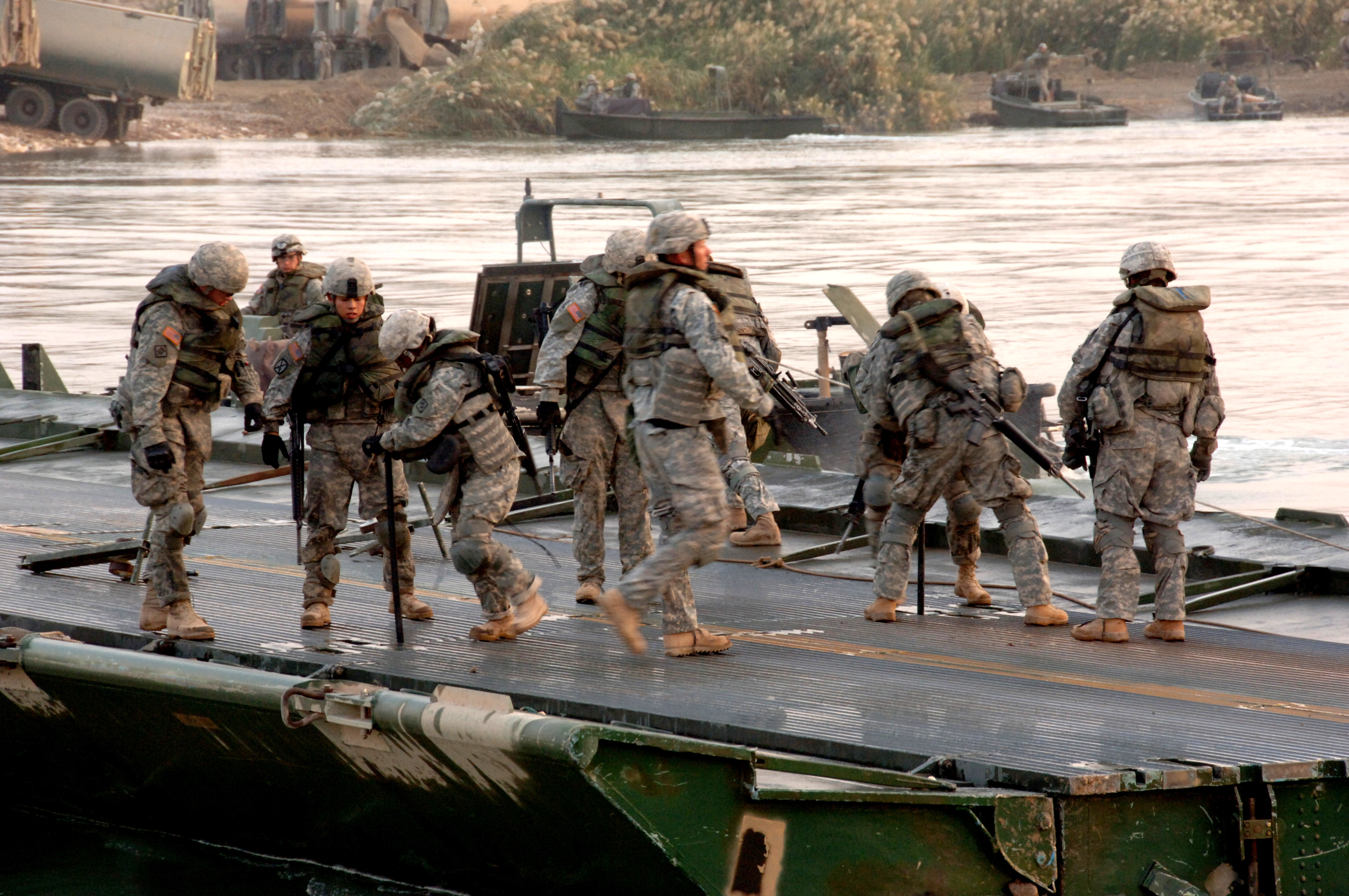
20th Engineer Brigade soldiers construct a bridge on the Euphrates River.

USACE provides support directly and indirectly to the warfighting effort. They build and help maintain much of the infrastructure that the Army and the Air Force use to train, house, and deploy troops. USACE built and maintained navigation systems and ports provide the means to deploy vital equipment and other material. Corps of Engineers Research and Development (R&D) facilities help develop new methods and measures for deployment, force protection, terrain analysis, mapping, and other support.

USACE directly supports the military in the battle zone, making expertise available to commanders to help solve or avoid engineering (and other) problems. Forward Engineer Support Teams, FEST-A's or FEST-M's, may accompany combat engineers to provide immediate support, or to reach electronically into the rest of USACE for the necessary expertise. A FEST-A team is an eight-person detachment; a FEST-M is approximately 36. These teams are designed to provide immediate technical-engineering support to the warfighter or in a disaster area. Corps of Engineers' professionals use the knowledge and skills honed on both military and civil projects to support the U.S. and local communities in the areas of real estate, contracting, mapping, construction, logistics, engineering, and management experience. Prior to their respective troop withdrawals in 2021, this included support for rebuilding Iraq, establishing infrastructure in Afghanistan, and supporting international and inter-agency services.

In addition, the work of almost 26,000 civilians on civil-works programs throughout USACE provides a training ground for similar capabilities worldwide. USACE civilians volunteer for assignments worldwide. For example, hydropower experts have helped repair, renovate, and run hydropower dams in Iraq in an effort to help Iraqis become self-sustaining.

=== Homeland security ===
USACE supports the United States' Department of Homeland Security and the Federal Emergency Management Agency (FEMA) through its security planning, force protection, research and development, disaster preparedness efforts, and quick response to emergencies and disasters.

The CoE conducts its emergency response activities under two basic authorities — the Flood Control and Coastal Emergency Act (Pub. L. 84–99), and the Stafford Disaster Relief and Emergency Assistance Act (Pub. L. 93–288). In a typical year, the Corps of Engineers responds to more than 30 Presidential disaster declarations, plus numerous state and local emergencies. Emergency responses usually involve cooperation with other military elements and Federal agencies in support of State and local efforts.

=== Infrastructure support ===
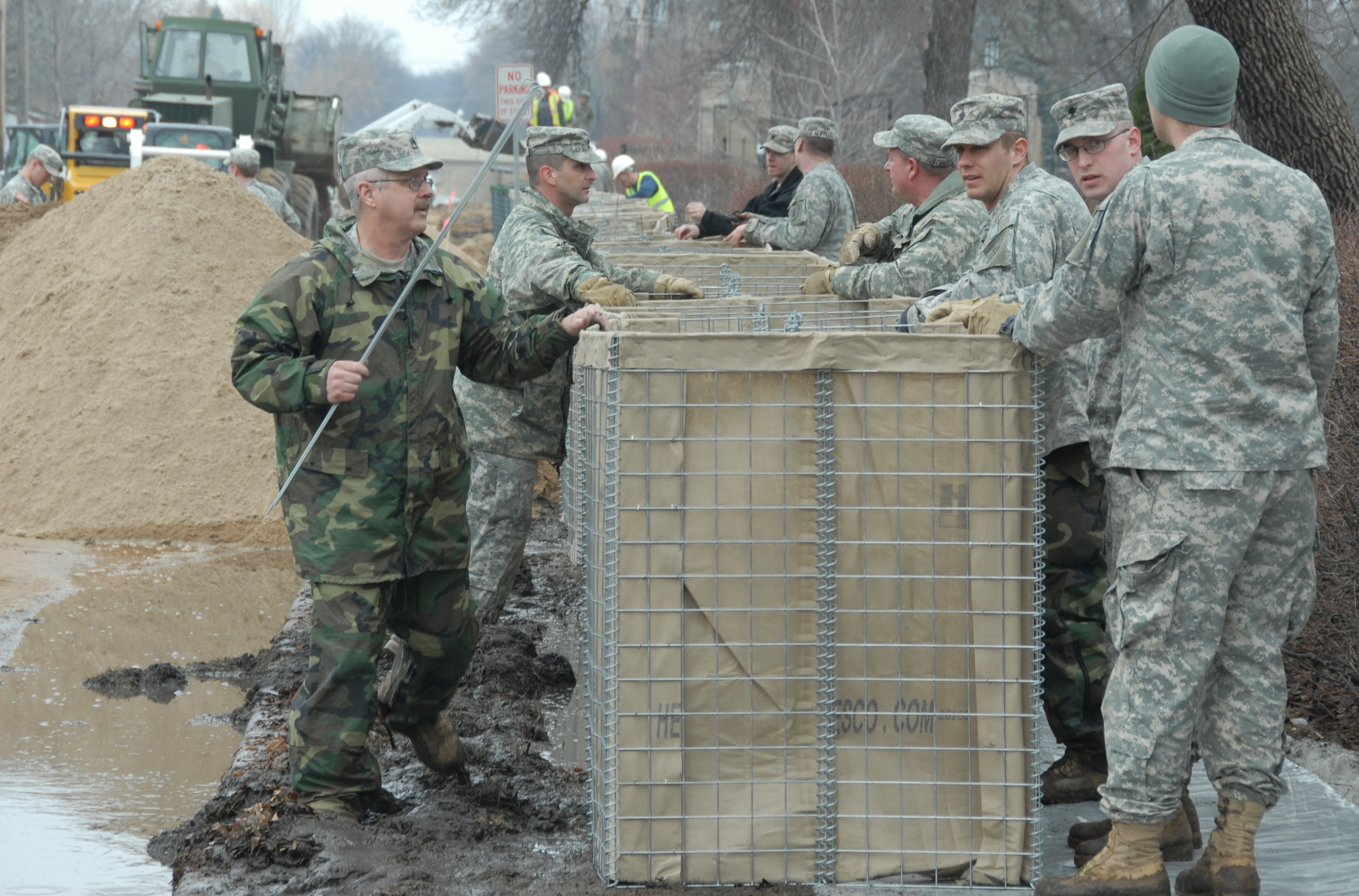
Soldiers assembling sections of a HESCO collapsible barrier device in Fargo, North Dakota

Work comprises engineering and management support to military installations, global real estate support, civil works support (including risk and priorities), operations and maintenance of Federal navigation and flood control projects, and monitoring of dams and levees.

More than 67 percent of the goods consumed by Americans and more than half of the nation's oil imports are processed through deepwater ports maintained by the Corps of Engineers, which maintains more than 12,000 miles (19,000 km) of commercially navigable channels across the U.S.

In both its Civil Works mission and Military Construction program, the Corps of Engineers is responsible for billions of dollars of the nation's infrastructure. For example, USACE maintains direct control of 609 dams, maintains or operates 257 navigation locks, and operates 75 hydroelectric facilities generating 24% of the nation's hydropower and three percent of its total electricity. USACE inspects over 2,000 Federal and non-Federal levees every two years.

Four billion gallons of water per day are drawn from the Corps of Engineers' 136 multi-use flood control projects comprising 9,800,000 acre-feet (12.1 km^{3}) of water storage, making it one of the United States' largest water supply agencies.

The 249th Engineer Battalion (Prime Power), the only active duty unit in USACE, generates and distributes prime electrical power in support of warfighting, disaster relief, stability and support operations as well as provides advice and technical assistance in all aspects of electrical power and distribution systems. The battalion deployed in support of recovery operations after 9/11 and was instrumental in getting Wall Street back up and running within a week. The battalion also deployed in support of post-Katrina operations.

All of this work represents a significant investment in the nation's resources.

=== Water resources ===
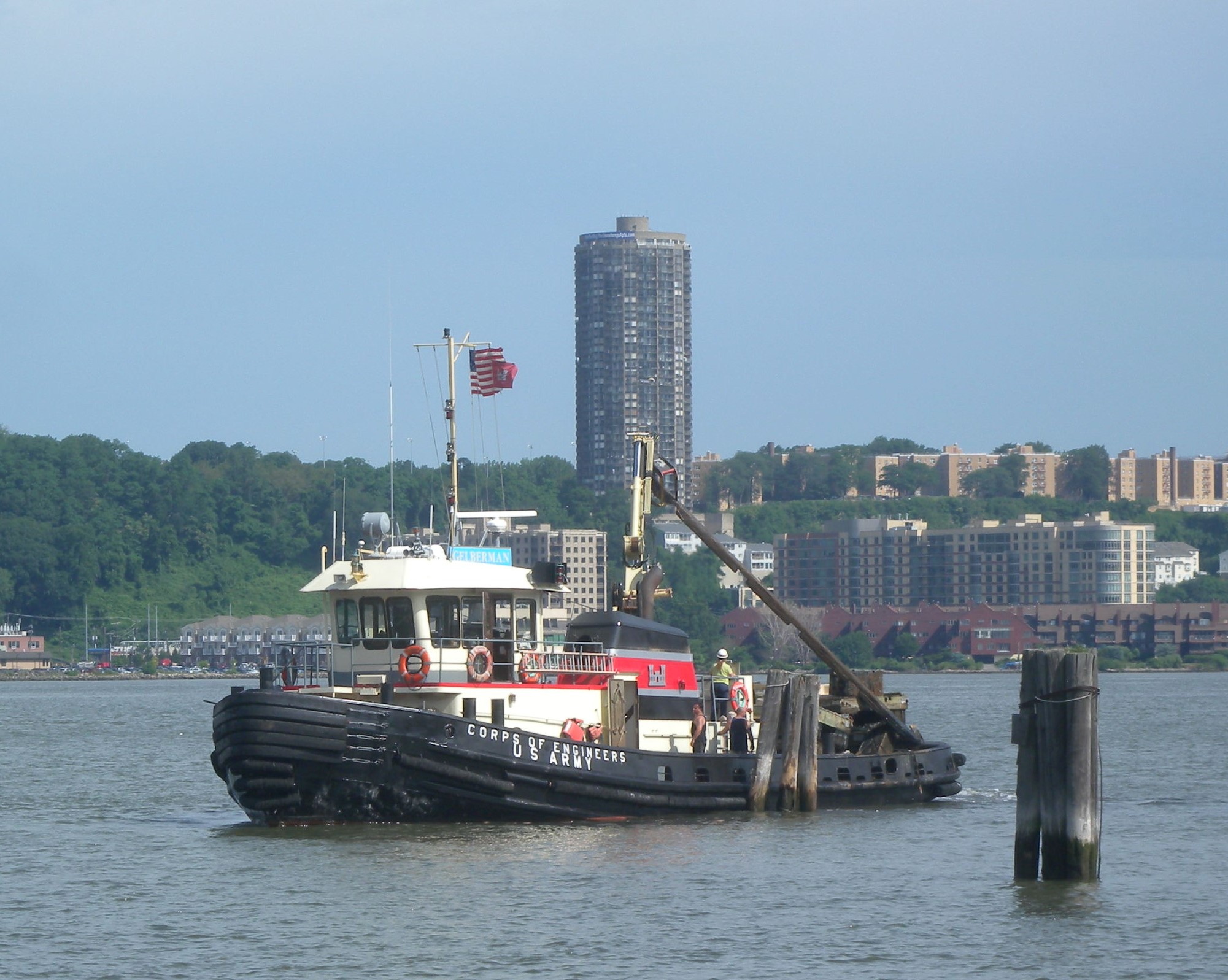
Removing a hazard to navigation on the Hudson River

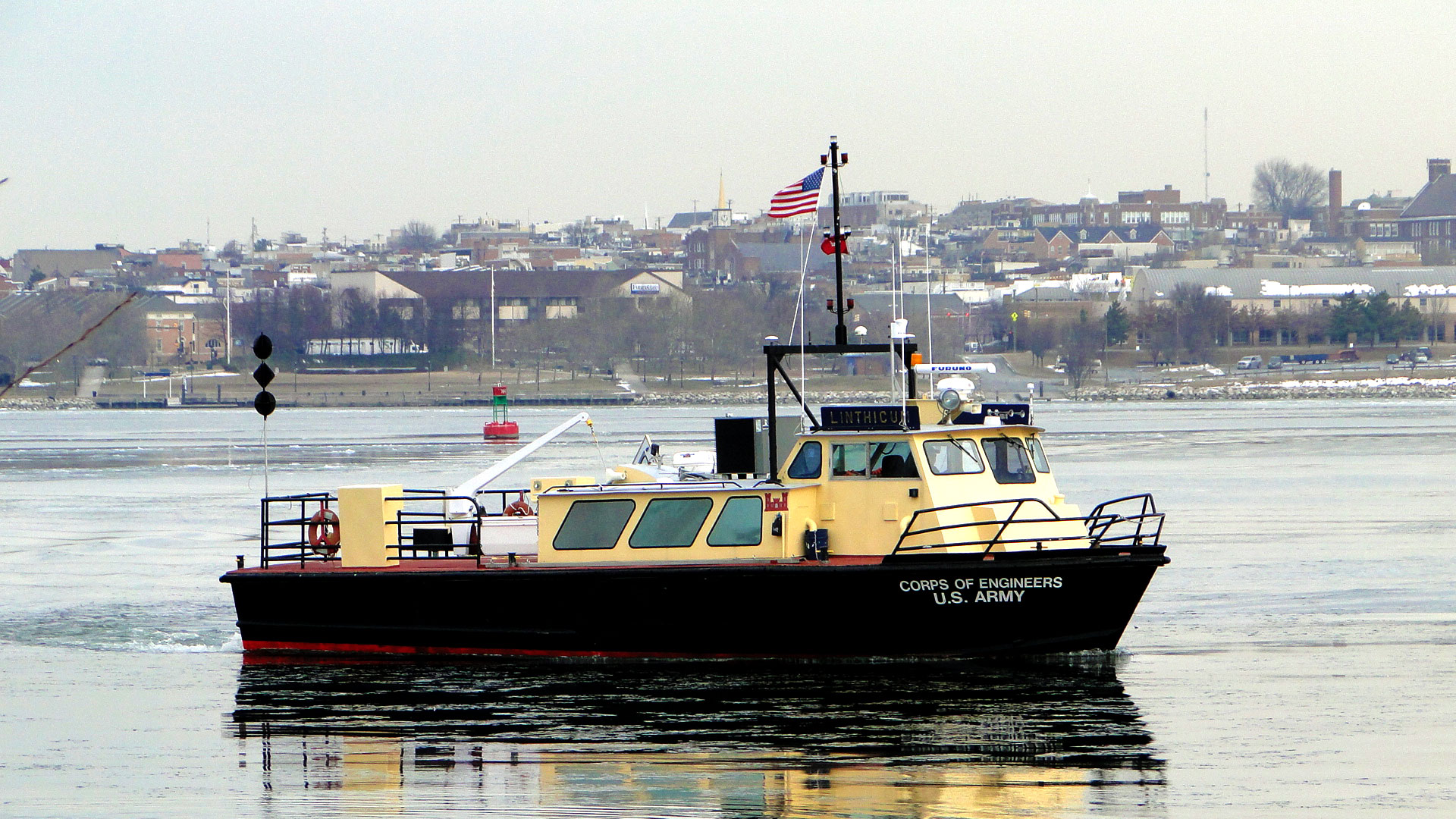
The survey vessel Linthicum in a channel near Fort McHenry; the ball-diamond-ball day shape displayed indicates a vessel restricted in its ability to maneuver.

Through its Civil Works program, USACE carries out a wide array of projects that provide coastal protection, flood protection, hydropower, navigable waters and ports, recreational opportunities, and water supply. Work includes coastal protection and restoration, including a new emphasis on a more holistic approach to risk management. As part of this work, USACE is one of the top providers of outdoor recreation in the U.S., so there is a significant emphasis on water safety.

Army involvement in works "of a civil nature," including water resources, goes back almost to the origins of the U.S. Over the years, as the nation's needs have changed, so have the Army's Civil Works missions.

Major areas of emphasis include the following:

- Navigation. Supporting navigation by maintaining and improving channels was the Corps of Engineers' earliest Civil Works mission, dating to federal laws in 1824 authorizing the corps to improve safety on the Ohio and Mississippi Rivers and several ports. Today, the Corps of Engineers maintains more than 12,000 miles (19,000 km) of inland waterways and operates 235 locks. These waterways—a system of rivers, lakes and coastal bays improved for commercial and recreational transportation—carry about 1/6 of the nation's inter-city freight, at a cost per ton-mile about 1/2 that of rail or 1/10 that of trucks. USACE also maintains 300 commercial harbors, through which pass 2,000,000,000 short tons (1.8×10^{9} metric tons) of cargo a year, and more than 600 smaller harbors. New locks are needed, according to the Corps and barge shippers, where existing locks are in poor condition, requiring frequent closures for repairs, and/or because a lock's size causes delays for barge tows.
- Flood Risk Management. The engineers were first called upon to address flood problems along the Mississippi river in the mid-19th century. They began work on the Mississippi River and Tributaries Flood Control Project in 1928, and the Flood Control Act of 1936 gave the corps the mission to provide flood protection to the entire country.
- Recreation. The Corps of Engineers is the nation's largest provider of outdoor recreation, operating more than 2,500 recreation areas at 463 projects (mostly lakes) and leasing an additional 1,800 sites to state or local park and recreation authorities or private interests. USACE hosts about 260 million visits a year at its lakes, beaches and other areas, and estimates that 25 million Americans (one in ten) visit a Corps' project at least once a year. Supporting visitors to these recreation areas generates 600,000 jobs.
- Hydroelectric Power. The Corps of Engineers was first authorized to build hydroelectric plants in the 1920s, and today operates 75 power plants, producing one fourth of the nation's hydro-electric power—or three percent of its total electric energy. This makes USACE the fifth largest electric supplier in the United States.
- Shore Protection. With a large proportion of the U.S. population living near our sea and lake shores, and an estimated 75% of U.S. vacations being spent at the beach, there has been Federal interest — and a Corps of Engineers mission — in protecting these areas from hurricane and coastal storm damage.
- Dam Safety. The Corps of Engineers develops engineering criteria for safe dams, and conducts an active inspection program of its own dams.
- Water Supply. The Corps first got involved in water supply in the 1850s, when they built the Washington Aqueduct. Today USACE reservoirs supply water to nearly 10 million people in 115 cities. In the drier parts of the Nation, water from Corps reservoirs is also used for agriculture.
- Water Safety. The Corps of Engineers has taken an interest in recreational water safety, with current initiatives for increasing the use rate of life jackets and preventing the use of alcohol while boating.

=== Environment ===
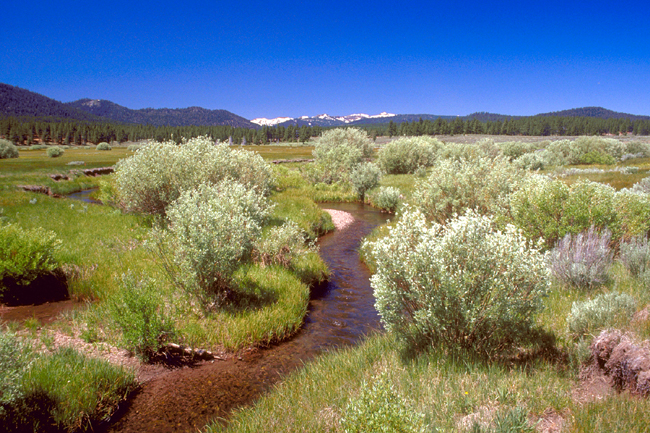
The Martis Creek Wetland Project in California

The U.S. Army Corps of Engineers environmental mission has two major focus areas: restoration and stewardship. The Corps supports and manages numerous environmental programs, that run the gamut from cleaning up areas on former military installations contaminated by hazardous waste or munitions to helping establish/reestablish wetlands that helps endangered species survive. Some of these programs include Ecosystem Restoration, Formerly Used Defense Sites, Environmental Stewardship, EPA Superfund, Abandoned Mine Lands, Formerly Utilized Sites Remedial Action Program, Base Realignment and Closure, 2005, and Regulatory.

This mission includes education as well as regulation and cleanup.

The U.S. Army Corps of Engineers has an active environmental program under both its Military and Civil Programs. The Civil Works environmental mission that ensures all USACE projects, facilities and associated lands meet environmental standards. The program has four functions: compliance, restoration, prevention, and conservation. The corps also regulates all work in wetlands and waters of the United States.

The Military Programs Environmental Program manages design and execution of a full range of cleanup and protection activities:

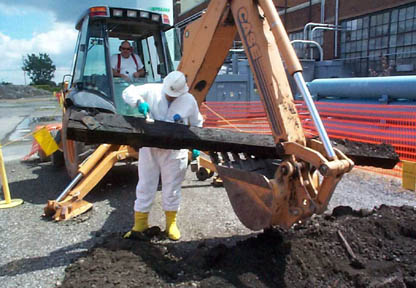
A member of the Radiation Safety Support Team, wearing a hazmat suit, tests excavated soil.

- cleans up sites contaminated with hazardous waste, radioactive waste, or ordnance
- complies with federal, state, and local environmental laws and regulations
- strives to minimize our use of hazardous materials
- conserves our natural and cultural resources

The following are major areas of environmental emphasis:

- Wetlands and Waterways Regulation and Permitting
- Ecosystem Restoration
- Environmental Stewardship
- Radioactive site cleanup through the Formerly Used Sites Remedial Action Program (FUSRAP)
- Base Realignment and Closure (BRAC)
- Formerly Used Defense Sites (FUDS)
- Support to EPA's Superfund Program

See also Environmental Enforcement below.

=== Sustainability ===
The Army adopted a sustainability policy in the early 2000s to make military bases, and the force as a whole, more resilient and less dependent on fossil fuels. Since the US military is one of the world's largest institutional energy consumers, this would have a significant impact on reducing waste, improving efficiency, and ensuring that public resources are used effectively.

The Army has developed and adopted its own triple bottom line framework shifting from the traditional "People Planet, and Profit" to "Mission, Community, and Environment". To meet these new sustainability targets, it has implemented regulations such as designing all new projects to meet the LEED silver standard. Additional regulations are detailed in the Sustainable Design and Development Policy.

The 2017 revision to the Sustainable Design and Development Policy outlines the updated goals and requirements the Army established in an effort to successfully complete the sustainability mission. Most of these requirements result in stricter regulations on the planning, design and construction of new projects and major renovations:

- Siting and site development
- Energy performance and security
- Indoor and outdoor water use
- Metering, monitoring, and subsystem measurement
- Indoor environmental quality
- Waste and recyclables management
- New and underused technologies
- Commissioning and plans for operation

Many of these goals fall directly onto USACE, as it oversees most construction and maintenance of Army bases and infrastructure. To embrace the branch's movement toward sustainability, USACE added sustainability as an overarching mission with several specific focus areas:

- Gaining expertise and becoming a leader in industry technology and advancement; primarily in areas surrounding construction and energy to enable high-performance buildings and civil works projects, as well as energy security
- Planning and implementing a number of approaches to mitigate the potential environmental changes due to the climate crisis specifically with regard to the nation's water infrastructure
- Focusing on purchases that further the sustainability mission and prioritizing designs/technology that are recycled, bio-based, or benefit the environment
- Releasing annual Sustainability Report and Implementation Plans for accountability and to track progress toward achieving energy goals

This challenge is not without its difficulties. The first report issued in 2008 showed that 78% of new projects were built to the LEED silver standard (without actually getting the certification) instead of the 100% required. In addition, there was an 8.4% and 32% reduction in energy use intensity and water use, respectively, and a 35% increase in hazardous waste production.

Later reports show some improvement toward resilience and sustainability. The 2020 Sustainability Report and Implementation Plan show a further 12% reduction in water use as well as 35% total reduction in energy use intensity since 2003. Future projections show that USACE intends to continue to build on these focus areas and drive down its demands in areas such as fuel, electricity and water.

== Operational facts and figures ==
Summary of facts and figures as of 2007, provided by the Corps of Engineers:

- One HQ, 8 divisions, 2 provisional divisions, 45 districts, 6 centers, one active-duty unit, 2 engineer reserve command
- At work in more than 90 countries
- Supports 159 Army installations and 91 Air Force installations
- Owns and operates 609 dams
- Owns or operates 257 navigation lock chambers at 212 sites
- Largest owner-operator of hydroelectric plants in the US. Owns and operates 75 plants—24% of U.S. hydropower capacity (3% of the total U.S. electric capacity)
- Operates and maintains 12,000 miles (19,000 km) of commercial inland navigation channels
- Maintains 926 coast, Great Lakes, and inland harbors
- Dredge 255,000,000 cubic yards (195,000,000 m^{3}) annually for construction or maintenance
- Nation's number one provider of outdoor recreation with more than 368 million visits annually to 4,485 sites at 423 USACE projects (383 major lakes and reservoirs)
- Total water supply storage capacity of 329,900,000 acre-feet (406.9 km^{3})
- Average annual damages prevented by Corps flood risk management projects (1995–2004) of $21 billion (see "Civil works controversies" below)
- Approximately 137 environmental protection projects under construction (September 2006 figure)
- Approximately 38,700 acres (157,000,000 m^{2}) of wetlands restored, created, enhanced, or preserved annually under the Corps' Regulatory Program
- Approximately $4 billion in technical services to 70 non-DoD Federal agencies annually
- Completed (and continuing work on) thousands of infrastructure projects in Iraq at an estimated cost over $9 billion: school projects (324,000 students), crude oil production 3 million barrels per day (480,000 m^{3}/d), potable water projects (3.9 million people (goal 5.2 million)), fire stations, border posts, prison/courthouse improvements, transportation/communication projects, village road/expressways, railroad stations, postal facilities, and aviation projects. More than 90 percent of the USACE construction contracts have been awarded to Iraqi-owned businesses — offering employment opportunities, boosting the economy, providing jobs, and training, promoting stability and security where before there was none. Consequently, the mission is a central part of the U.S. exit strategy.
- The Corps of Engineers has one of the strongest Small Business Programs in the Army—Each year, approximately 33% of all contract dollars are obligated with Small Businesses, Small Disadvantaged Businesses, Service Disabled Veteran Owned Small Businesses, Women Owned Small Businesses, Historically Underutilized Business Zones, and Historically Black Colleges and Universities. Jackie Robinson-Burnette was named the Chief of the Corps' Small Business Program in May 2010. The program is managed through an integrated network of over 60 Small Business Advisors, 8 Division Commanders, 4 Center Directors, and 45 District Commanders.

== Environmental protection and regulatory program ==
The regulatory program is authorized to protect the nation's aquatic resources. USACE personnel evaluate permit applications for essentially all construction activities that occur in the nation's waters, including wetlands. Two primary authorities granted to the Army Corps of Engineers by Congress fall under Section 10 of the Rivers and Harbors Act and Section 404 of the Clean Water Act.

Section 10 of the Rivers and Harbors Act of 1899 (codified in Chapter 33, Section 403 of the United States Code) gave the Corps authority over navigable waters of the United States, defined as "those waters that are subject to the ebb and flow of the tide and/or are presently being used, or have been used in the past, or may be susceptible for use to transport interstate or foreign commerce." Section 10 covers construction, excavation, or deposition of materials in, over, or under such waters, or any work that would affect the course, location, condition or capacity of those waters. Actions requiring section 10 permits include structures (e.g., piers, wharfs, breakwaters, bulkheads, jetties, weirs, transmission lines) and work such as dredging or disposal of dredged material, or excavation, filling or other modifications to the navigable waters of the United States. The Coast Guard also has responsibility for permitting the erection or modification of bridges over navigable waters of the U.S.

Another of the major responsibilities of the Army Corps of Engineers is administering the permitting program under Section 404 of the Federal Water Pollution Control Act of 1972, also known as the Clean Water Act. The Secretary of the Army is authorized under this act to issue permits for the discharge of dredged and fill material in waters of the United States, including adjacent wetlands. The geographic extent of waters of the United States subject to section 404 permits fall under a broader definition and include tributaries to navigable waters and adjacent wetlands. The engineers must first determine if the waters at the project site are jurisdictional and subject to the requirements of the section 404 permitting program. Once jurisdiction has been established, permit review and authorization follows a sequence process that encourages avoidance of impacts, followed by minimizing impacts and, finally, requiring mitigation for unavoidable impacts to the aquatic environment. This sequence is described in the section 404(b)(1) guidelines.

There are three types of permits issued by the Corps of Engineers: Nationwide, Regional General, and Individual. 80% of the permits issued are nationwide permits, which include 50 general type of activities for minimal impacts to waters of the United States, as published in the Federal Register. Nationwide permits are subject to a reauthorization process every 5 years, with the most recent reauthorization occurring in March, 2012. To gain authorization under a nationwide permit, an applicant must comply with the terms and conditions of the nationwide permit. Select nationwide permits require preconstruction notification to the applicable corps district office notifying them of his or her intent, type and amount of impact and fill in waters, and a site map. Although the nationwide process is fairly simple, corps approval must be obtained before commencing with any work in waters of the United States. Regional general permits are specific to each corps district office. Individual permits are generally required for projects that impact greater than 0.5 acres (2,000 m^{2}) of waters of the United States. Individual permits are required for activities that result in more than minimal impacts to the aquatic environment.

== Research ==
The Corps of Engineers has two research organizations, the Engineer Research and Development Center (ERDC) and the Army Geospatial Center (AGC).

ERDC provides science, technology, and expertise in engineering and environmental sciences to support both military and civilian customers. ERCD research support includes:

- Dam safety systems
- Mapping and topography terrain analysis
- Infrastructure design, construction, operations and maintenance
- Structural engineering
- Cold-regions science and engineering
- Coastal and hydraulic engineering, producing products such as HEC-RAS
- Environmental quality, including toxic chemistry of bay mud and other dredge spoils
- Geotechnical engineering
- Earthquake engineering
- High performance computing and information technology

AGC coordinates, integrates, and synchronizes geospatial information requirements and standards across the Army and provides direct geospatial support and products to warfighters. See also Geospatial Information Officer.

== Insignia ==
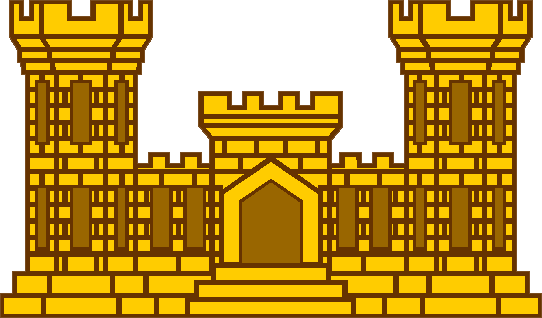
Branch insignia of the Corps of Engineers

The Corps of Engineers branch insignia, the Corps Castle, is believed to have originated on an informal basis. In 1841, cadets at West Point wore insignia of this type. In 1902, the Castle was formally adopted by the Corps of Engineers as branch insignia. The "castle" is actually the Pershing Barracks at the United States Military Academy in West Point, New York.

A current tradition was established with the "Gold Castles" branch insignia of General of the Army Douglas MacArthur, West Point Class of 1903, who served in the Corps of Engineers early in his career and had received the two pins as a graduation gift of his family. In 1945, near the conclusion of World War II, General MacArthur gave his personal pins to his chief engineer, General Leif J. Sverdrup. On 2 May 1975, upon the 200th anniversary of the Corps of Engineers, retired General Sverdrup, who had civil engineering projects including the landmark 17-mile-long (27 km) Chesapeake Bay Bridge-Tunnel to his credit, presented the Gold Castles to then-Chief of Engineers Lieutenant General William C. Gribble, Jr., who had also served under General MacArthur in the Pacific. General Gribble then announced a tradition of passing the insignia along to future chiefs of engineers, and it has been done so since.

== Controversies ==
=== Civil works ===
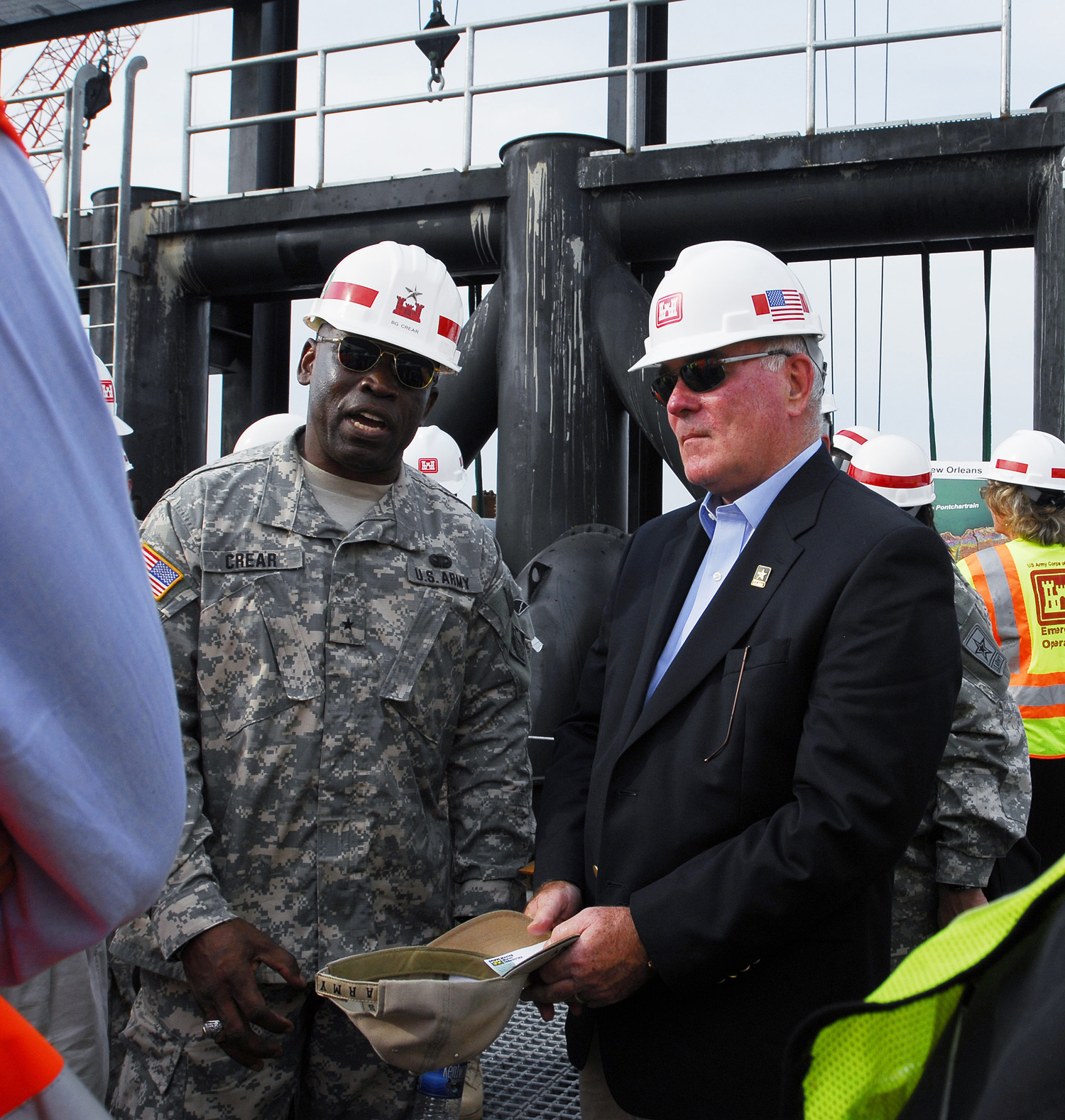
U.S. secretary of the Army Francis J. Harvey (on right) discusses U.S. Army Corps of Engineers operations in New Orleans with Brigadier General Robert Crear, commander of the Mississippi Valley Division in 2006

Some of the Corps of Engineers' civil works projects have been characterized in the press as being pork barrel or boondoggles such as the New Madrid Floodway Project and the New Orleans flood protection. Projects have allegedly been justified based on flawed or manipulated analyses during the planning phase. Some projects are said to have created profound detrimental environmental effects or provided questionable economic benefit such as the Mississippi River–Gulf Outlet in southeast Louisiana. Faulty design and substandard construction have been cited in the failure of levees in the wake of Hurricane Katrina that caused flooding of 80% of the city of New Orleans.

Review of Corps of Engineers' projects has also been criticized for its lack of impartiality. The investigation of levee failure in New Orleans during Hurricane Katrina was sponsored by the American Society of Civil Engineers (ASCE) but funded by the Corps of Engineers and involved its employees.

Corps of Engineers projects can be found in all 50 states, and are specifically authorized and funded directly by Congress. Local citizen, special interest, and political groups lobby Congress for authorization and appropriations for specific projects in their area.

Senator Russ Feingold and Senator John McCain sponsored an amendment requiring peer review of Corps projects to the Water Resources Development Act of 2006, proclaiming "efforts to reform and add transparency to the way the U.S. Army Corps of Engineers receives funding for and undertakes water projects." A similar bill, the Water Resources Development Act of 2007, which included the text of the original Corps' peer review measure, was eventually passed by Congress in 2007, overriding Presidential veto.

USACE civil works activities 2005

=== Military construction ===
A number of Army camps and facilities designed by the Corps of Engineers, including the former Camp O'Ryan in New York State, have reportedly had a negative impact on the surrounding communities. Camp O'Ryan, with its rifle range, has possibly contaminated well and storm runoff water with lead. This runoff water eventually runs into the Niagara River and Lake Ontario, sources of drinking water to millions of people. This situation is exacerbated by a failure to locate the engineering and architectural plans for the camp, which were produced by the New York District in 1949.

=== Greenhouse whistleblower suit ===
Bunnatine "Bunny" Greenhouse, a formerly high-ranking official in the Corps of Engineers, won a lawsuit against the United States government in July 2011. Greenhouse had objected to the Corps accepting cost projections from KBR in a no-bid, noncompetitive contract. After she complained, Greenhouse was demoted from her Senior Executive Service position, stripped of her top secret security clearance, and even, according to Greenhouse, had her office booby-trapped with a trip-wire from which she sustained a knee injury. A U.S. District court awarded Greenhouse $970,000 in full restitution of lost wages, compensatory damages, and attorney fees.

== Units ==
- 412th Engineer Command
- 416th Engineer Command
- 1st Engineer Brigade
- 16th Engineer Brigade
- 18th Engineer Brigade
- 20th Engineer Brigade
- 35th Engineer Brigade
- 36th Engineer Brigade
- 111th Engineer Brigade
- 130th Engineer Brigade
- 194th Engineer Brigade
- 372nd Engineer Brigade
- 411th Engineer Brigade
- 420th Engineer Brigade
- 555th Engineer Brigade
- 926th Engineer Brigade
- 1st Engineer Battalion
- 2nd Engineer Battalion
- 3rd Engineer Battalion
- 4th Engineer Battalion
- 5th Engineer Battalion (36th Engineer Brigade)
- 6th Engineer Battalion (11th Airborne Division)
- 8th Engineer Battalion
- 9th Engineer Battalion
- 10th Engineer Battalion
- 11th Engineer Battalion (130th Engineer Brigade)
- 14th Engineer Battalion
- 15th Engineer Battalion (18th Engineer Brigade)
- 16th Engineer Battalion
- 19th Engineer Battalion
- 20th Engineer Battalion (36th Engineer Brigade)
- 21st Engineer Battalion
- 23rd Engineer Battalion
- 27th Engineer Battalion
- 29th Engineer Battalion
- 31st Engineer Battalion (1st Engineer Brigade)
- 35th Engineer Battalion (1st Engineer Brigade)
- 37th Engineer Battalion
- 39th Engineer Battalion
- 40th Engineer Battalion
- 41st Engineer Battalion
- 44th Engineer Battalion
- 46th Engineer Battalion
- 52nd Engineer Battalion
- 54th Engineer Battalion (18th Engineer Brigade)
- 62nd Engineer Battalion (36th Engineer Brigade)
- 65th Engineer Battalion
- 70th Engineer Battalion
- 82nd Engineer Battalion
- 84th Engineer Battalion (130th Engineer Brigade)
- 91st Engineer Battalion
- 92nd Engineer Battalion
- 94th Engineer Battalion
- 101st Engineer Battalion
- 103rd Engineer Battalion
- 105th Engineer Battalion
- 107th Engineer Battalion
- 112th Engineer Battalion (16th Engineer Brigade)
- 120th Engineer Battalion
- 122nd Engineer Battalion
- 127th Engineer Battalion
- 130th Engineer Battalion
- 133rd Engineer Battalion
- 168th Engineer Battalion
- 169th Engineer Battalion (1st Engineer Brigade)
- 178th Engineer Battalion
- 204th Engineer Battalion
- 206th Engineer Battalion
- 216th Engineer Battalion (16th Engineer Brigade)
- 224th Engineer Battalion
- 227th Engineer Battalion
- 230th Engineer Battalion (194th Engineer Brigade)
- 236th Engineer Battalion
- 244th Engineer Battalion
- 249th Engineer Battalion
- 299th Engineer Battalion
- 307th Engineer Battalion
- 315th Engineer Battalion
- 321st Engineer Battalion
- 326th Engineer Battalion
- 363rd Engineer Battalion (411th Engineer Brigade)
- 365th Engineer Battalion
- 367th Engineer Battalion (372nd Engineer Brigade)
- 368th Engineer Battalion
- 389th Engineer Battalion
- 391st Engineer Battalion (926th Engineer Brigade)
- 397th Engineer Battalion
- 411th Engineer Battalion
- 448th Engineer Battalion
- 458th Engineer Battalion
- 467th Engineer Battalion (926th Engineer Brigade)
- 463rd Engineer Battalion (411th Engineer Brigade)
- 478th Engineer Battalion (411th Engineer Brigade)
- 479th Engineer Battalion
- 489th Engineer Battalion (420th Engineer Brigade)
- 505th Engineer Battalion
- 528th Engineer Battalion
- 554th Engineer Battalion (1st Engineer Brigade)
- 572nd Engineer Battalion
- 588th Engineer Battalion
- 724th Engineer Battalion
- 837th Engineer Battalion
- 841st Engineer Battalion (926th Engineer Brigade)
- 844th Engineer Battalion
- 854th Engineer Battalion (411th Engineer Brigade)
- 863rd Engineer Battalion (372nd Engineer Brigade)
- 864th Engineer Battalion (555th Engineer Brigade)
- 877th Engineer Battalion
- 926th Engineer Battalion (926th Engineer Brigade)
- 961st Engineer Battalion (420th Engineer Brigade)
- 980th Engineer Battalion (420th Engineer Brigade)
- 983rd Engineer Battalion (372nd Engineer Brigade)
- 1092nd Engineer Battalion (111th Engineer Brigade)
- 1249th Engineer Battalion

=== Deactivated Units ===
- 2nd Engineer Brigade
- 7th Engineer Battalion
- 317th Engineer Battalion
- 1203rd Engineer Battalion

== Notable personnel ==
- Charles Keller, former U.S. Army Brigadier General and the oldest Army officer to serve on active duty during World War II.
- Peter Conover Hains, former U.S. Army Major General and the oldest Army officer to serve on active duty during World War I. The only known person to serve in both the American Civil War and the First World War.

== See also ==
- United States Engineer Regiments in World War II
- Combat Pin for Civilian Service
- SDEF
- Title 33 of the Code of Federal Regulations
- United States Air Force Rapid Engineer Deployable Heavy Operational Repair Squadron Engineers
- United States Navy Seabees
