= SDEF =

The Standard Data Exchange Format (SDEF) provides a proprietary protocol to exchange project planning and progress data between scheduling systems and project management software. It is used by the United States Army Corps of Engineers USACE (or Corps Of Engineers, COE) in their project management and network analysis systems (NAS). The USACE publications library includes the exact SDEF specification in PDF format.
