= Combat Pin for Civilian Service =

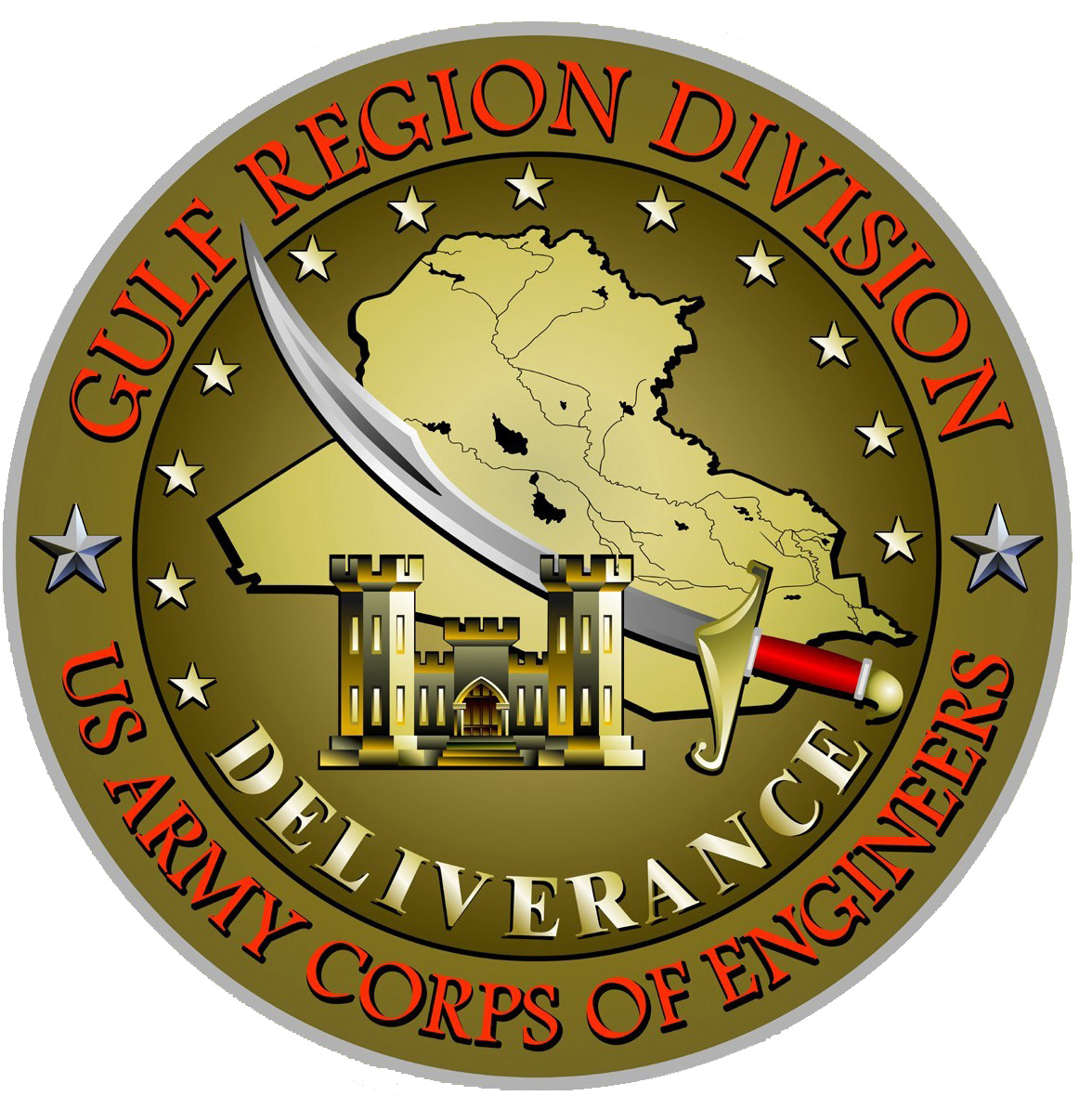
Combat Pin for Civilian Service (Gulf Region)

Combat Pin for Civilian Service (CPCS) Is a combat service recognition decoration awarded to U.S. Army Corps of Engineers (USACE) civilian employees. The Gulf Region CPCS is a lapel pin designed after the Army Corps of Engineer's Gulf Region Division (GRD) logo. The Afghanistan Region CPCS is modeled after the Afghanistan District (AED) logo.

== History and Creation ==
The Combat Pin for Civilian Service was established in 2005 by the United States Army Corps of Engineers (USACE). Civilian personnel assigned to USACE in Iraq and Afghanistan were exposed to combat-related hazards, including direct contact with the enemy, indirect artillery mortar fire, incoming sniper fire, and improvised explosive devices (IEDs), comparable to those encountered by military service members. However, The Department of the Army regulations prohibited civilians from wearing combat patches on their uniforms or being awarded the U.S. Army’s Combat Action Badge, which served as an authorized symbol of deployment and recognition of serving in combat.

The initiative for the pin was proposed by Kelly Brown, Deputy Director of the Great Lakes and Ohio River Division. It was approved by Brigadier General Thomas Bostick, Commander of the GRD, and implemented under the guidance of Command Sergeant Major Jorge Gutierrez. The design—a miniature reproduction of the GRD command coin and emblem—was created by Jan Fitzgerald of the Visual Information Branch, Humphreys Engineer Center Support Activity.

The first informal presentation occurred on April 28, 2005, followed by the official introduction at a ceremony in Baghdad on May 31, 2005.

Authorized for wear, the Combat Pin for Civilian Service serves as an official recognition of service in a combat zone for civilian employees of the U.S. Army Corps of Engineers.

== Eligibility ==
Must be a U.S. Army Corps of Engineer civilian employee that has served with the Gulf Region Division or Afghanistan Engineer District for more than 60 days within a combat zone.
