= Proto-Slavic accent =

The Proto-Slavic accent is the accentual system of Proto-Slavic and is closely related to the accentual system of some Baltic languages (Lithuanian and Latvian) with which it shares many common innovations that occurred in the Proto-Balto-Slavic period. Deeper, it inherits from the Proto-Indo-European accent. In modern languages the prototypical accent is reflected in various ways, some preserving the Proto-Slavic situation to a greater degree than others.

== Evolution ==
Proto-Balto-Slavic is reconstructed with a free lexical accent, and a distinction between "short" and "long" syllables. A long syllable was any syllable containing either a long vowel, a diphthong, or a so-called "sonorant diphthong" consisting of a short vowel plus *l, *m, *n or *r in the syllable coda. Short syllables consisted of a short vowel with either no coda or an obstruent in the coda. The distinction between long and short syllables remained important throughout the early history of Slavic.

Long vowels were present in Proto-Balto-Slavic, and remained in Proto-Slavic as well. However, alongside the distinctions in quantity, Slavic also developed distinctions in quality between short and long vowels:

- Short *a was rounded to *o.
- Short *i and *u were lowered to *ь and *ъ, and later often lost through Havlík's law. Long *ū was unrounded to *y.
- Long *ē was lowered to *ě.

This became important towards the end of the Proto-Slavic period, where certain dialects acquired new long and short vowels distinct from the older ones, based on these differences in quality.

Proto-Balto-Slavic long syllables could bear a suprasegmental feature known as acute. The acute feature could occur independently of the accent, and Slavic retained this situation until at least the operation of Dybo's law. This sound change shifted the accent one syllable rightwards if it previously fell on a non-acuted syllable (whether short or long), and the syllable that the accent shifted onto still had the acute–nonacute distinction at this time. However, by the time of Ivšić's law, the acute feature was no longer apparent; the accent retraction that occurred as part of this law produced the same result on all long syllables, regardless of whether it was originally acuted or not. The Slavic accent had changed from being purely positional to also being intonational: the acute was converted to a distinct rising intonation on accented long syllables, and lost elsewhere. Unaccented syllables now distinguished only between long and short.

Slavic also inherited from Proto-Balto-Slavic the distinction between fixed and mobile accentual paradigms in verbs and nominals. In fixed paradigms, the accent was on the same stem syllable in all forms, while in mobile paradigms, it would alternate between the first syllable of the stem and the ending. Fixed paradigms were split in two by the operation of Dybo's law, which created a new accent paradigm b by shifting the accent onto the ending. The accent was then shifted back again in some forms by Ivšić's law, creating a new type of mobile pattern. Paradigms which remained fixed were assigned to accent paradigm a. The inherited Balto-Slavic mobile paradigms were not split in this way thanks to Meillet's law, and remained unified in accent paradigm c.

== System ==
There is no consensus among linguists on the exact prosodical nature of late Proto-Slavic, or Common Slavic. Two different schools of thought exist, the more-or-less "traditional" school (exemplified by Jasanoff, Kapović and Olander among others) and the more radical "Leiden" school (exemplified by Derksen, Kortlandt and Pronk among others). The most important difference between the two, in the context of the Slavic accent and prosody in general, is that the traditional viewpoint holds that Proto-Slavic retained all length distinctions as they were inherited from Proto-Balto-Slavic, whereas the Leiden school argues that some long vowels were shortened and short vowels were lengthened already in Proto-Slavic. Thus:

- Traditionally, the old acute is reconstructed as long, but it is reconstructed as short everywhere by the Leiden linguists.
- The Leiden linguists posit a lengthening of short vowels in "monosyllables" (one syllable + final yer), thus allowing for circumflex and long neoacute on originally short vowels. Traditionally, such vowels are considered short in Proto-Slavic, and the long vowels that are found in the later dialects are regarded as Post-Common-Slavic developments.

The various accent types of Proto-Slavic are indicated with different diacritical symbols. The following table helps map between the notational systems found in various sources. The vowel symbols stand for different vowel classes that the accent can appear on: o stands for any original short mid vowel, ъ stands for any original short high vowel (yer), a for any original long vowel or liquid diphthong.

Comparison of prosodic notation
		Traditional	Leiden
Old short	Initial	ȍ ъ̏	
Old short	Medial	ò	
Old short	Final	ò	
Short neoacute	Initial	ò ъ̀	
Short neoacute	Medial	ò ъ̀	
Circumflex	Initial	ȃ	ȃ ȏ ъ̑
Old acute	Initial	a̋	à
Old acute	Medial	a̋	à
Old acute	Final	a̋	à
Long neoacute	Initial	ã or á	á ó ъ́
Long neoacute	Medial	ã or á	á
Long unaccented		N/A	ā

There may be some variation in notation even within the same school. Both ⟨á⟩ and ⟨ã⟩ are used for the neoacute accent for example, reflecting the accents used in standard Shtokavian (long rising) and Chakavian (neoacute) respectively. Jasanoff uses a vertical mark ⟨a̍ o̍ ъ̍⟩ to mark the accent on syllables where the tonality is implied because no contrastive tone exists, using the more specific symbols above only to indicate tonal contrasts.

The old acute accent could occur on any syllable of a word (*ba̋ba, *lopa̋ta, *golva̋), but only on a long syllable. Phonetically it is usually reconstructed as a rising tone, traditionally long, but short in the Leiden school. Within Balto-Slavic framework this matches with rising intonation of the cognate Latvian ⟨õ⟩ and length marks on the second part of diphthongs in Old Prussian. However, critics of this interpretation claim that one can hardly derive the Serbo-Croatian short falling tone ⟨ȍ⟩, shortness in Slovak, length in Czech and the rising intonation in Russian pleophony from the former long rising tone. Some speculate that Proto-Slavic acute was phonetically in fact something entirely different, e.g. a glottalized syllable comparable to stød in Danish, or something similar.

The old short and circumflex accents represent the historical lack of the acute register on the syllable, on short and long syllables respectively. They are sometimes referred to as short and long circumflex. In Slavic, they behaved similarly with respect to accent shifts such as Dybo's law, but were differentiated by word position:

- In initial syllables, both are reconstructed with a falling intonation, and such words were phonologically probably unaccented. That phonological unaccentedness was manifested as a falling tone (which is confirmed by Serbo-Croatian, Slovene and Russian reflexes).
- In non-initial syllables, the only vowels in this group which could occur were the mid vowels e and o. Ivšić's law had eliminated all circumflex and closed short vowels from non-initial syllables, becoming instead neoacute accents on the preceding syllable. Non-initial accented short vowels bore a rising intonation, although this was noncontrastive.

The neoacute accent was a new type of accent that resulted from accent retraction through Ivšić's law. It is traditionally reconstructed as a rising intonation on the basis of Slovene and Russian, and the description of dialectal Chakavian Serbo-Croatian ⟨õ⟩ as a rising tone. The neoacute occurred in both short and long varieties:

- The short neoacute had the same intonation as old short vowels on medial syllables, but contrasted with the short falling tone on initial syllables. There is a distinct reflex in Slovak and some Russian dialects.
- The long neoacute had a distinctive long rising intonation in all syllables. Unlike the other types of long accent, the long neoacute preserved its length in all languages that retain length distinctions.

Unaccented syllables did not bear contrastive tone, but according to the Leiden school, did have contrastive length. The traditional school does not reconstruct distinctly long unaccented vowels, instead regarding all original long vowels as long within Proto-Slavic.

=== Valence theory ===
There is also a third school, namely the Moscow accentological school (exemplified by Dybo, Nikolaev, Schallert, and now also Kapović, among others). Perhaps, the most important difference from the "traditional" and "Leiden" schools is the use of morphophonological valences and the refusal of the Stang theory of the origin of the "new acute" in all forms as a result of accent retraction.

Prosodic notation
	Moscow
Dominant acute	a̋
Recessive acute	â
Dominant circumflex	ã
Recessive circumflex	ȃ
Long	ō

Sometimes dominant short ⟨ò⟩ and recessive short ⟨ȍ⟩ are used, as well as ictus ⟨a̍ or o̍⟩ (vertical mark) to remove prosodic connotations.

The dominant acute (or the old acute) is reconstructed on the historically long and short syllables. Morphophonologically it has a higher (dominant, +) valence. Phonetically reconstructed as a rising-falling syllable tone with a short, but sharp rising part and with a longer falling slope. Within Balto-Slavic framework, dominant acute corresponds to the Latvian drawling intonation ⟨ã⟩ and length marks on the second part of diphthongs in Old Prussian, and with the Lithuanian acute ⟨ó⟩.

The recessive acute is reconstructed on the historically long and short syllables. Morphophonologically it has a lower (recessive, −) valence. Phonetic reconstruction of the syllable tone is unknown. Within Balto-Slavic framework, recessive acute corresponds to the Latvian broken intonation ⟨â⟩ and the Lithuanian acute ⟨ó⟩.

The dominant circumflex (or the new acute) is reconstructed on the historically long and short syllables. After rejecting the Stang's theory is recognized as a direct reflex of the Proto-Balto-Slavic dominant circumflex. Morphophonologically it has a higher (dominant, +) valence. Phonetically reconstructed as a rising syllable tone. Within Balto-Slavic framework, dominant circumflex corresponds to the Latvian falling intonation ⟨à⟩ and the Lithuanian circumflex ⟨ã⟩.

The recessive circumflex (or the circumflex) is reconstructed on the historically long and short syllables. Morphophonologically it has a lower (recessive, −) valence. Phonetically reconstructed as a falling syllable tone. Within Balto-Slavic framework, recessive circumflex corresponds to the Latvian falling intonation ⟨à⟩ and the Lithuanian circumflex ⟨ã⟩.

The long is mainly used on final vowels in the word form. A striking example of this is the "long yer" in the genitive plural.

==== Dybo's contour rule ====
Valence is a morphophonological quality that determines the choice of an accent paradigm, attributed to the root morpheme and morphemic endings of the root, i.e. to affixes and endings.

- The first rule. In a sequence consisting only of dominant morphemes, the ictus (vertical mark) is placed on the first morpheme:
1. *sta̍r_{(+)}-ьс_{(+)}-ь̄_{(+)}
2. *brju̍x_{(+)}-at_{(+)}-ě_{(+)}-ti_{(+)}
3. *vy̍_{(+)}-děl_{(+)}-a_{(+)}-ti_{(+)}
- The second rule. In a sequence consisting only of recessive morphemes, ictus (vertical mark) is placed on the first morpheme:
1. *lě̍n_{(−)}-ъ_{(−)}
2. *lě̍n_{(−)}-ost_{(−)}-ь_{(−)}
3. *o̍_{(−)}-krъv_{(−)}-av_{(−)}-i_{(−)}-l_{(−)}-ъ_{(−)}
- The third rule. In a sequence that includes only one dominant morpheme, ictus (vertical mark) is placed on this dominant morpheme, regardless of the number and location of recessive morphemes:
1. *lěn_{(−)}-ost_{(−)}-ь_{(−)}-jǫ̍_{(+)}
2. *měx_{(−)}-ov_{(−)}-ь̍j_{(+)}-e_{(−)}
3. *mold_{(−)}-ь̍с_{(+)}-e_{(−)}-mь_{(−)}
4. *gla̍d_{(+)}-ъk_{(−)}-o_{(−)}-mь_{(−)}
- The fourth rule. In a sequence consisting of several dominant morphemes divided by recessive morphemes, ictus (vertical mark) is placed on the first dominant morpheme:
1. *sta̍r_{(+)}-ost_{(−)}-ь_{(−)}-jǫ_{(+)}
2. *bog_{(−)}-a̍t_{(+)}-o_{(−)}-jǫ_{(+)}
3. *mě̍d_{(+)}-ęn_{(−)}-ic_{(+)}-e_{(−)}-jǫ_{(+)}
4. *mě̍d_{(+)}-ęn_{(−)}-ic_{(+)}-a_{(+)}
- The fifth rule. In a sequence consisting of several homogeneous sequences of dominant morphemes, divided from each other by recessive morphemes, ictus (vertical mark) is placed on the first morpheme of the first sequence of dominant morphemes:
1. *ko̍z_{(+)}-ьj_{(+)}-e_{(−)}-jǫ_{(+)}
2. *sto̍l_{(+)}-ič_{(+)}-ьn_{(−)}-o_{(−)}-jǫ_{(+)}
3. *čь̍rn_{(+)}-ič_{(+)}-ьn_{(−)}-īk_{(+)}-o_{(−)}-ma_{(+)}
4. *žě̍n_{(+)}-ьstv_{(+)}-ьn_{(−)}-ost_{(−)}-ь_{(−)}-jǫ_{(+)}

The first and second rules show, that sequences of morphemes of the same valence get ictus on the first morpheme. The third and fourth rules show that sequences of morphemes of different valence get ictus on the first dominant morpheme. Given the fifth rule, the general "contour rule" that regulates the setting of ictus in all types of morpheme sequences in Balto-Slavic is formulated as follows: Ictus is placed at the beginning of the first sequence of morphemes of the highest (dominant) valence. A single morpheme is also considered a sequence.

== Paradigms ==
Since Stang (1957) three accent paradigms (or accent types) are reconstructed for Proto-Slavic, traditionally marked with letters a, b and c. Their reflexes in individual Slavic languages are usually marked as A, B, C. Stang's original reconstruction was for nominals (nouns and adjectives), and Dybo (1963) subsequently expanded these to Proto-Slavic verbs as well.

Accent paradigm a words have a fixed accent on one of the syllables of the stem. If the stem is monosyllabic, that syllable will be acute-accented. If the stem is polysyllabic, the accent may be acute, but can also be short on e and o (from Dybo's law) or neoacute (from Dybo's law followed by Ivšić's law).

Examples: *bàba (feminine noun), acc. *bàbǫ; *gàdъ (masculine noun), gen. *gàda; *kopỳto (neuter noun), gen. *kopỳta; *slàbъ m (adjective), neuter *slàbo; *osnòvā (feminine noun), acc. *osnòvǫ; *nāròdъ; *pàtiti (verb), second-person plural present *pàtīte.

Accent paradigm b words have either a neoacute on the final syllable of the stem (*bòbъ, *võrtīte) or any accent on the first syllable of the ending (*trāva̍, *nosi̋ti). Examples: *žena̍ (feminine noun), acc. *ženǫ̍; *pòpъ (masculine noun), gen. *popa̍; *selo̍ (neuter noun), gen. *sela̍; *ògnь (i-stem noun), gen. *ogni̍; *dòbrъ m (adjective), neuter: *dobro̍; *nosi̋ti (verb), second-person plural present *nòsīte.

Accent paradigm c words have a mobile, free accent (also known as lateral mobility) - either a short/circumflex accent on the first syllable (*rǭka̍: acc. *rǫ̑kǫ), an acute on a medial syllable i.e. the penultimate syllable of the ending (instr. *rǫka̋mi, *uči̋ti) or any accent on the final syllable (dat. *golsomъ̍, second-person plural present *učīte̍). Initial short/circumflex always "jumps" to the preceding syllable (a preposition or a conjunction) in a phonetic word; e.g. *nȃ rǭkǫ (Serbo-Croatian: nȁ rūku). Similarly, if the short/circumflexed word is followed by a word lacking an accent, the accent is transferred onto it: *rǭkǫ že̍. Examples: *nogà (feminine noun), acc. *nȍgǫ; *gȏlsъ (masculine noun), gen. *gȏlsa; *zvȍno (neuter noun), gen. *zvȍna; *gȏldь (i-stem noun), gen. *gȏldi; *dȏrgъ m (adjective), neuter: *dȏrgo; *čini̋ti (verb), second-person plural present *činīte̍).

=== Valence theory ===
The Moscow accentological school, which reconstructs Proto-Indo-European and Proto-Balto-Slavic with underlying dominant and recessive syllables, posits four accent paradigms for Proto-Slavic rather than the standard three: a, b, c and d for nominals, and a, b_{1}, c and b_{2} for verbs.

Accent paradigm d is a mixed accent paradigm, as in the nominative and accusative singular present secondary forms-enclinomena, i.e. with the recessive valence of the root. It is also part of the accent paradigm b. The accent paradigm d is reconstructed in o-stems, u-stems, i-stems of Balto-Slavic masculine and feminine genders, consonant stems and es-stems neuter gender. The table shows the forms with accent before the Dybo's law, but after the Fortunatov–de Saussure's law, cf. locative singular. At the same time, the final vowels retain their length under the dominant valence.

Accent paradigm d, ("pine tree")
	Singular	Dual	Plural
Nominative	*bȏrъ	*bõry	*bõrove
Accusative	*bȏrъ	*bõry	*bõry
Genitive	*bõrъ	*bõrovū	*bõrovъ̄
Locative	*borū̋	*bõrovū	*bõrъxъ
Dative	*bõrovi	*bõrъmā	*bõrъmь
Instrumental	*bõrъmь	*bõrъmā	*bõrъmī
Vocative	*bõru	*bõry	*bõrove

== Descendant languages ==
The suprasegmental vowel features of modern Slavic languages largely reflect the Proto-Slavic system, and are summarized in the table below.

Suprasegmental features of modern Slavic languages
Family	Language	Free accent	Pitch contrast	Accented length	Unaccented length
Proto-Slavic		Yes	Yes	According to some linguists	According to some linguists
South Slavic	Bulgarian	Yes	No	No	No
South Slavic	Macedonian	Some dialects	No	No	No
South Slavic	Old Shtokavian	Yes	Some dialects	Yes	Yes
South Slavic	Neoshtokavian	Yes	Innovated	Yes	Yes
South Slavic	Chakavian	Yes	Most dialects	Yes	Yes
South Slavic	Kajkavian	Yes	Yes	Yes	Some dialects
South Slavic	Slovene	Yes	Some dialects	Yes	No
East Slavic	Belarusian	Yes	No	No	No
East Slavic	Rusyn	Some dialects	No	No	No
East Slavic	Russian	Yes	No	No	No
East Slavic	Ukrainian	Yes	No	No	No
West Slavic	Czech	No	No	Yes	Yes
West Slavic	Slovak	No	No	Yes	Yes
West Slavic	Sorbian	No	No	No	No
West Slavic	Polish	No	No	No	No
West Slavic	Slovincian	Yes	No	Yes	Yes

Proto-Slavic accent remained free and mobile in East Slavic and South Slavic. The only exception in South Slavic is Macedonian which has a fixed stress on the antepenultimate syllable in the standard language, with southern and south-western Macedonian dialects exhibiting fixed penultimate stress, and eastern dialects exhibiting free stress. In many dialects the original Proto-Slavic accent position has changed its place; e.g. in literary Serbo-Croatian retracting by one syllable which yielded the new rising pitch (the so-called Neoshtokavian retraction), with old accent partly or fully preserved in nonstandard dialects (Old Shtokavian, Chakavian, Kajkavian). Beside phonological causes, position of Proto-Slavic accent was often lost due to the leveling out within the mobile paradigm. In Slovene stress shifts occurred in both directions depending on the old pitch and vowel quantity, yielding tonal and stress-based variants of modern literary Slovene. In West Slavic, free accent is attested at the periphery in the northern Kashubian dialects (including Slovincian, an archaic dialect extinct since the 1940s) and Polabian (spoken on Elbe in northern-central Germany, extinct since the 18th century).

Vowel length became distinctive (phonemic) in West and partially South Slavic. In the West Slavic languages it was accompanied by extensive contraction due to the loss of /j/, typically resulting in a long vowel. This process was centered in the Czech area, and covered Russian and Bulgarian areas at its extremes. This new length is preserved only in Czech and Slovak, but is lost in most other West Slavic varieties. Several West Slavic languages reflect older length contrasts in the form of new quality contrasts, indirectly preserving the distinction. For example, Polish ó and ą are reflexes of older long vowels, even though they are no longer long. Length was phonemicized in Serbo-Croatian and Slovene, depending on the pitch. In Neoshtokavian Serbo-Croatian no pre-tonic lengths are allowed; i.e. with Neoshtokavian retraction occurring the length of old long accented syllables was retained as a post-tonic length. In Slovene, length is restricted to the stressed position, with the exception of /ə/ which is always short.

The Proto-Slavic three-way opposition of old acute, short/circumflex and neoacute was in its original form lost in all Slavic languages. It was reworked into a two-way opposition, in one of two typical ways:

1. Merging old acute and neoacute, contrasting with short/circumflex. In Czech, Slovene and Upper Sorbian the new opposition become that of quantity (acute merger > long, circumflex > short). In East Slavic, Bulgarian and Macedonian this new quantitative opposition was subsequently lost, and sometimes reinterpreted as stress position (e.g. in the pleophonic reflex in East Slavic, with acute yielding VRV́ and circumflex yielding V́RV)
2. Merging old acute and short/circumflex, contrasting with neoacute. In Slovak, Polish and Lower Sorbian the new opposition become that of quantity (neoacute > long, old acute and circumflex > short). In Serbo-Croatian and Slovene the new opposition become that of pitch (neoacute > rising, old acute and circumflex > falling). Subsequently, Neoshtokavian retraction in standard Serbo-Croatian created new tonal oppositions (former pre-tonic > rising, former initially stressed syllable > falling).

Correspondences of reflexes of Proto-Slavic accent on initial syllable in languages that have retained lengths and/or intonation
Language	Number of syllables	Old acute	Long neoacute	Short neoacute	Circumflex	Short
Neoshtokavian Serbo-Croatian	one	|ȍ|	|ȏ|	|ȍ|	|ȏ|	|ȏ|
Neoshtokavian Serbo-Croatian	two	|ȍ|o|	|ȏ|o|	|ȍ|o|	|ȏ|o|	|ȍ|o|
Neoshtokavian Serbo-Croatian	three	|ȍ|o|o|	|ȏ|o|o|	|ȍ|o|o|	|ȍ|o|o|	|ȍ|o|o|
Chakavian Serbo-Croatian	one	|ȍ|	|ó|	|ȍ|	|ȏ|	|ȏ|
Chakavian Serbo-Croatian	two	|ȍ|o|	|ó|o|	|ȍ|o|	|ȏ|o|	|ȍ|o|
Chakavian Serbo-Croatian	three	|ȍ|o|o|	|ó|o|o|	|ȍ|o|o|	|ȍ|o|o|	|ȍ|o|o|
Old Shtokavian Serbo-Croatian	one	|ȍ|	|ó|	|ȍ|	|ȏ|	|ȏ|
Old Shtokavian Serbo-Croatian	two	|ȍ|o|	|ó|o|	|ȍ|o|	|ȏ|o|	|ȍ|o|
Old Shtokavian Serbo-Croatian	three	|ȍ|o|o|	|ó|o|o|	|ȍ|o|o|	|ȍ|o|o|	|ȍ|o|o|
Kajkavian Serbo-Croatian	one	|ȍ|	|ó|	|ȍ|	|ȏ|	|ȏ|
Kajkavian Serbo-Croatian	two	|ȍ|o|	|ó|o|	|ȍ|o|	|ȏ|o|	|ȏ|o|
Kajkavian Serbo-Croatian	three	|ȍ|o|o|	|ó|o|o|	|ȍ|o|o|	|ȏ|o|o|	|o|ȏ|o|
Slovene	one	|ȍ|	|ó|	|ȍ|	|ȏ|	|ȏ|
Slovene	two	|ó|o|	|ó|o|	|ó|o|	|o|ȏ|	|o|ȏ|
Slovene	three	|ó|o|o|	|ó|o|o|	|ó|o|o|	|o|ȏ|o|	|o|ȏ|o|
Czech	one	|ō|	|ō|	|ō|	|o|	|o|
Czech	two	|ō| |	|ō| |	|ō| |	|o| |	|o| |
Czech	three	|o| | |	|ō|ō| |	|ō| | |	|o| | |	|o| | |
Slovak	one	|o|	|ō|	| |	|o|	|o|
Slovak	two	|o| |	|ō| |	| | |	|o| |	|o| |
Slovak	three	|o| | |	|ō| | |	| | | |	|o| | |	|o| | |

Serbo-Croatian: ȍ = short falling, ȏ = long falling, ò = short rising, ó = long rising, o = short vowel without distinctive tone
Slovene: ȍ = short falling, ȏ = long falling, ó = long rising, o = short vowel without distinctive tone
Czech and Slovak: ō = long vowel, o = short vowel, | | = either long or short vowel

=== Neoshtokavian ===
The Neoshtokavian variant of Serbo-Croatian, on which all standard languages are based, initially lost all pitch distinctions. All accents became falling in pitch. Only length distinctions remained, with the old acute, short neoacute and short accent being reflected as short, and the circumflex and long neoacute being reflected as long. In monosyllables, the short accent was lengthened. Length remained in some cases in unaccented syllables.

The Neoshtokavian retraction reintroduced pitch distinctions. All non-initial accents were retracted, producing a rising accent on the newly accented syllable. Both the newly accented and the originally accented syllables kept their length. In initial syllables, the new rising accent contrasted with the old falling accent, which remained. In non-initial syllables, only the rising accent could now occur, and the final syllable could not be accented at all.

=== Chakavian ===
Chakavian accentuation is particularly archaic, and therefore invaluable for reconstructing the Common Slavic situation. The old acute and short neoacute merge with the short accent, all becoming a short falling intonation. The long neoacute and circumflex remain distinct, reflected as long rising and long falling respectively. Thus, there are no pitch distinctions in short syllables, but they remain in long syllables, unlike the earlier stages of Neoshtokavian.

In a closed syllable before a sonorant, the short falling accent is lengthened, producing different intonation in different dialects. In northern Chakavian, the result is a long rising accent, while in the south there is a long falling accent instead.

=== Kajkavian ===
Kajkavian accentuation is similar to Slovene. It resembles Slovene in lengthening the old short accent, producing a long falling accent that merges with the old circumflex. However, there is no lengthening in non-final syllables and no progressive accent shift. Thus, the old acute and short neoacute remain short in all syllables. In long syllables, long rising (neoacute) and long falling (circumflex) are distinguished, as in Chakavian.

The neo-circumflex is a change shared with Slovene as well. Original short rising (acute and neoacute) syllables were converted to a long falling accent before a long vowel.

=== Slovene ===
In Slovene the "rising" intonation is realised as "low" and "falling" intonation is realised as "high". In each accented prosodic word, the final syllable bears the opposite accent of the accented syllable. If the final syllable is accented, then they sort of merge to form the traditional "rising" (instead of "low") and "falling" (instead of "high"). About half of the dialects still retain the initial tonal differences, most of them being situated along the Sava river or in the northwest. In others, all acute syllables merged with circumflex ones. There are also some dialects, particularly the South White Carniolan dialect and the eastern Lower Carniolan dialect, where the tonal differences are only lost on the last syllables.

In the dialectal history of Proto-Slavic, the acute accent was shortened in Slovene, as it was in all neighbouring Serbo-Croatian dialects. It fell together with the short neoacute and was treated identically from there on. Unlike the other languages, however, Slovene kept the old acute and short neoacute distinct from the old short accent in non-final syllables, initially producing a short rising accent that was later lengthened, whereas the short accent already lengthened to long circumflex.

Following this, the neo-circumflex arose, a change shared with Kajkavian. Original short rising (acute and neoacute) syllables were converted to a long falling accent under certain conditions, which re-established the falling accent in initial syllables of multisyllabic words. The neo-circumflex arose when the next syllable contained a non-final weak yer or a long vowel. The following long vowel was shortened, and the previous syllable received compensatory lengthening. It also occurred in the volja-type nouns, where the exact explanation varies (according to the Leiden school, the final a was long).

The first change specific to Slovene, the progressive accent shift, shifted the word-initial falling tone (short or circumflex) one syllable to the right e. g. *sě̑no / prȍso > *sěnȏ / prosȏ. The previously accented syllable became short, while the newly accented syllable was lengthened and received a falling intonation. In monosyllables (whether due to loss of a yer or original), the rightward shift was blocked and the falling accent was lengthened without movement. As a result of these shifts, the distinction between short and circumflex accent was eliminated entirely in Slovene, with all falling accents being automatically long.

Another change that affected Slovene was the shift from final short vowel (old acute or short neoacute) to the unstressed long vowel before it, e. g. *svě̄t́à → *svě́t́a (now svẹ̑ča). The following syllable stayed short and the preceding syllable became long rising. All other unstressed long syllables became short. This was the last accent change universal to all Slovene dialects, with exception of Čičarija dialect, which was originally a Chakavian dialect. Alpine Slovene (1000–1200 AD) therefore had the following three possible accents:

- Long acute (á), that was result of long neoacute, after the *svě̄t́à → *svě́t́a shift, short neoacute in some special cases, and after contraction of VjV → V (with v being any vowel) if the accent was on the second syllable.
- Long circumflex (ȃ), that was result of old circumflex, old short accent, neocircumflex, after *sě̑no / prȍso > *sěnȏ / prosȏ shift, and after contraction of VjV → V (with v being any vowel) if the accent was on the first syllable.
- Short acute (à), that was result of old acute and short neoacute.
- Short unaccented (a), that was result of unaccented long or short syllables, except those affected by accent shifts.

After that, there were also many changes, but they did not affect all Slovene dialects.

Around the 14th century, another change occurred to eliminate length contrasts, this time in rising syllables: all non-final rising accents became long, thus merging with the existing long neoacute; exception are prefixes and some unspecified pronouns. After this change, accented length distinctions existed (mostly) only in the final syllable. Final short rising accents (old acute or short) were non-distinctively converted to a falling tone; now all rising accents were automatically long. This change occurred initially only in southern and western dialects; it later (around 17th century) happened also in the northern dialects and southern Styrian dialect plane. It also occurred in northern Styrian dialect plane, however not fully as the antepenultimate syllables still stayed short. It did not occur in the Pannonian dialect plane and consequently Prekmurje Slovene. The mark for short falling accent is double grave (ȁ).

There are three additional accent retractions that are present in nowadays Standard Slovene, with the latter two being optional. In the first that happened in the 15th century, the accent retracted from word-final short syllables (old acute or short) onto the unaccented /e/ or /o/ before it, except onto prefixes and clitics, e. g. *ženȁ → *žèna, but not in *pogrȅb (po- + grȅb). The newly accented syllable was initially short, but now only Tolmin, Cerkno, part of Rosen Valley, part of Jaun Valley, Prlekija and Premurje dialects still have not lengthened them, while in some (e. g. Upper Carniolan dialect) it even became falling (while still retaining pitch distinctions). This shift did not occur in northwestern Rosen Valley, Resian, Torre Valley, and Natisone Valley dialects, as well as the southern part of Soča dialect. In Standard Slovene, it is realised as long acute (žéna).

The second retraction was from word-final short syllables (old acute or short) onto the unaccented /ə/ before it e. g. *məglȁ → *mə̀gla. Apart from aforementioned dialects, this shift is also not present in Upper and Lower Carniolan dialects, but it is present in Ljubljana accent as the schwa vocalised into /e/ and then *ženȁ → *žèna shift followed. The newly accented syllable mostly stayed short; the exception are dialects which eliminated length distinctions or some less common cases where it vocalised into /a/ and then lengthened. Standard Slovene allows for both accentuations (məglȁ or mə̀gla). Therefore, the pitch distinction is reestablished in short syllables. However, only Horjul dialect still retains pitch distinctions and has undergone the shift. The Poljane dialect has once lost pitch distinctions since all syllables became falling, but the newly accented syllables stayed rising, providing a unique accentuation among the Slovene dialects, similar to the Neoshtokavian retraction.

Third retraction that occurred is from middle circumflex accent (from circumflex and short) to the long syllable before it, e. g. *nalọ̑ga → *náloga. The new accent is long rising. The shift occurs sporadically on the whole area, but is more prominent in Carinthian and Pannonian dialect planes. This shift is shared with Kajkavian and it seems that it already appeared quite early, before the shortening of unaccented long syllables, but that there was a long time when both forms were used and later one became dominant.

There are also numerous accent shifts that happened in fewer dialects. In most cases, the new syllable became falling and long:

- From short circumflex closed final syllables to the preceding syllable, turning it acute (*pijȁn > *pìjan), which happened in some Littoral, Rovte, Styrian, and Lower Carniolan dialects in the 18th century.
- From short circumflex closed final syllables to a vowel two syllables in a word before, turning it acute (*ropotȁt > *ròpotat), which happened in Karst, Inner Carniolan, Istrian, and in part Kostel dialect.
- From long circumflex syllable to a preceding syllable, shortening and turning it acute (*sěnȏ > *sě̀no), which happened in many, not closely related and geographically separate dialects from the 18th century onwards.
- From long acute syllable to a preceding syllable while also shortening the vowel (*kováč > *kòvač), which happened in Kostel and North White Carniolan dialects.
- From short acute first syllable in words with three syllables to a following syllable (*bàbica > *babìca), which happened in a part of Rosen Valley, Jaun Valley, Mežica, North Pohorje-Remšnik, Upper Savinja, Kozjak subdialect, and a part of Torre Valley dialect.
- From long acute first syllable in words with two syllables to a following syllable, where the new vowel is short and circumflex (*zíma > *zimȁ), which happened in a part of Torre Valley dialect.

Some rare dialects retained lengths on the previously accented long syllable, therefore introducing long unaccented syllables again.

Karst and Resian dialects, as well as some Styrian dialects completely lost length distinctions. The same is true for Standard Slovene, although most dictionaries still distinguish between long and short vowels. Distribution of rising and falling vowels also varies drastically between dialects and current standard contains a lot of metatony, mostly from acute to circumflex.

Modern Standard Slovene has four different accentual types:

- Fixed accent (accent is always on the same syllable on the stem), derived from accent pattern A, due to one of the shifts from pattern B or because of simplification from type C (most frequently in a-stems).
- Mobile accent (accent switches between two syllables on the stem), derived from pattern A after the *ženȁ → *žèna shift since the shift only happened if there was no ending because of early lengthening (e.g. *človèk, *človẹ́ka → *člóvek, *človẹ́ka)
- Ending accent (accent is on the ending), derived from pattern B, but is now mostly limited to words without vowels in the stem, otherwise it is also allowed in words before the *məglȁ → *mə̀gla shift.
- Mixed accent (accent changes between the stem and the ending), derived from pattern C, due to the progressive accent shift, or by analogy (e.g. srebrọ̑ 'silver' by analogy to zlatọ̑ 'gold')

See Slovene declension for more details.

=== Russian ===
Russian lost distinctive pitch and length, having instead a free stress accent. A vestige of the former pitch accent remains in the outcome of the liquid diphthongs *el, *er, *ol and *or, which undergo so-called pleophony (полногла́сие polnoglásiye). When these originally bore an acute or neoacute accent, they surface with the accent on the second vowel (oró), while if they had a circumflex accent, they appear with the accent on the first vowel (óro). This reflects the original rising and falling intonations of these accents.

Russian has largely preserved the three accentuation classes across different word classes – accentual irregularities are often the longest-lasting remnants of Proto-Slavic forms such as the dual or masculine u- and i-stems. The table below gives a basic overview of how the inherited accent patterns commonly correspond to Andrey Zaliznyak's accent system (less common patterns in parentheses):

Inherited accent pattern vs. Zaliznyak letter(after Melvold 1989)
		AP a	AP b	AP c
Nouns	Masculine	a	b	e (c)
Nouns	Neuter	a	(b), d	c
Nouns	Feminine	a	(b), d	f' (f), d'
Nouns	3rd decl.	a	b'	e (f'')
Adjectives		a	b/b, a/b	b/c, a/c
Verbs	Derived 1st	a	a, c	
Verbs	2nd	a	b, c	
Verbs	Non-derived	a	b/b, b	b/c

One key innovation is the generalization of Ivšić's law to what Melvold (following Halle) terms lexical marking for retraction on certain words from inherited accent classes b and c, shown after a comma in the table. This moves the stress to the last syllable of the stem in particular areas: plural cases in nouns, the long form in adjectives, the present tense other than the first person singular in derived verbs, and the infinitive and past forms in non-derived verbs (this last actually deriving from Hirt's law).

This had the greatest effect on (j)a-stem feminine and (j)o-stem neuter nouns: most inherited AP b words in these groups have Zaliznyak d (end stress in the singular, stem stress in the plural). Many mobile feminine nouns have also migrated from Zaliznyak f' (end stress except on the accusative singular and nominative plural) to this simpler pattern, with some frozen mid-transition at Zaliznyak d' (keeping stem stress on the accusative singular) and Zaliznyak f (keeping end stress other than in the nominative in the plural). The genitive plural ending -ей -ey resists retraction in some feminine nouns of this type, though like the refusal of mobile vowels in some words to bear stress, this is not reflected in a separate Zaliznyak stress pattern.

Another shift is whether certain endings are accented by AP b or c roots. This is most evident in short form adjectives, which as well as the basic patterns a (all stem), b (all ending) and c (only feminine is end stressed), have words in which the plural form (and for some the neuter as well) may have stem or end stress (Zaliznyak c' and c''). As with the largely unwritten phenomenon of Russian stress in general, which form is standard is often unclear and changing; with the neuter, one form may be preferred as an adverb.

== Length ==
Beside the contrastive tone (rising vs. falling), the Late Proto-Slavic also had a vowel quantity (long vs. short) which was phonemically non-distinctive. Vowels were predictably short and thus neutral with respect to length in pretonic positions further away from the accent (stress) than the first pretonic syllable. In other words, long vowels could occur in:

1. the stressed syllable
2. posttonic syllables
3. the first pretonic syllable

Old East Slavic and Old Polish loanwords in Finnish, Karelian, Estonian, Lithuanian and Latvian show that the length of the originally long vowels in Slavic (*a, *ě, *i, *u, *ǫ, *ę) is retained regardless of the intonation, the position in the word or the number of syllables. These loanwords show no trace of the old nasality of *ę and *ǫ which indicates that the original Proto-Slavic length was preserved in all positions and conditions even after the denasalisation of *ǫ and *ę.

After surveying the data with respect to stress type (acute, short/circumflex, neoacute), the number of the syllables in a word, the position (stressed, pretonic or posttonic) and the accentual paradigm (a, b or c), Kapović (2005) offers the following reflexes for West Slavic, and Serbo-Croatian, which have retained distinctive lengths:

	Common Slavic accented length			Common Slavic pretonic length		Common Slavic posttonic length	
	Rising	Falling	New rising	In front of less than two moras	In front of two moras	After short/circumflex (a. p. c)	After old acute (a. p. a)
	The old acute is shortened in Serbo-Croatian to short falling accent. In Czech, it remains long in the mono- and bisyllabic words.	The old circumflex remains long falling in mono- and bisyllabic words in Serbo-Croatian, and is shortened in longer ones. It is shortened in West Slavic.	The neo-acute remains long everywhere, the number of syllables is irrelevant.	The length is preserved in front of less than two moras.	The length is shortened in front of two moras (two full syllables or a long accented syllable).	Preserved in Serbo-Croatian, shortened in West Slavic.	Preserved in Serbo-Croatian, preserved inconsistently in West Slavic.
Example	PSl. *vőrna > SCr. vrȁna, Cz. vrána	PSl. *mę̑so > SCr. mȇso, Cz. maso; SCr. grȃda (gen. sg.) : grȁdovi (nom. pl.)	PSl.*pǫ̃tьnīkъ > SCr. pũtnīk, Cz. poutník	PSl. *trǭba̍ > SCr. trúba, Cz. trouba	PSl. *trǭbica > SCr. trùbica, Cz. trubice	PSl. *gȍlǭbь > SCr. gȍlūb, Cz. holub	PSl. *mě̋sę̄cь > SCr. m(j)ȅsēc, Cz. měsíc

== See also ==
- Proto-Indo-European accent
- Proto-Balto-Slavic language
