= Christian Stang =

Norwegian linguist (1900–1977)

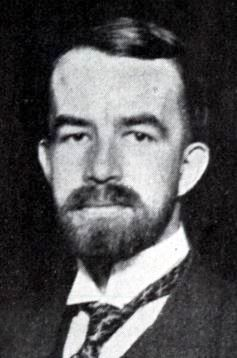
- Stang, c. 1933
- Born: 15 March 1900; Kristiania, Norway (now Oslo, Norway)
- Died: 2 July 1977 (aged 77); Kirkenes, Norway

Academic work
- Discipline: Indo-European linguistics
- Institutions: University of Oslo
- Notable ideas: Stang's law Stang–Ivšić's law

Christian Schweigaard Stang (15 March 1900 – 2 July 1977) was a Norwegian linguist, Slavicist, and Balticist, who served as professor of Balto-Slavic languages at the University of Oslo from 1938 until shortly before his death in 1977. He specialized in the study of Lithuanian and was highly regarded in Lithuania.

== Early life ==
He was born in Kristiania as a son of politician and academic Fredrik Stang (1867–1941) and his wife Caroline Schweigaard (1871–1900). He was a grandson of Emil Stang and Christian Homann Schweigaard, and a nephew of Emil Stang, Jr. He grew up in Kristiania and took his examen artium 1918 at Frogner School.

== Career ==
He received his magister degree in comparative Indo-European linguistics in 1927, and his Ph.D. in 1929. Subsequently, he was the University Fellow in comparative Indo-European linguistics for the period 1928–33. From 1938 to 1970 he was professor of Slavonic languages at the University of Oslo. He served as the dean of the Faculty of Humanities from 1958 to 1960.

Stang was recognized as the leading international expert on Slavic Language learning, on the Baltic-Slavonic comparative linguistics, as well as Lithuanian during his period of study. One of Stang's most noted works was "Vergleichende Grammatik der baltischen Sprachen" (in English "Comparative Grammar of the Baltic languages") published in 1966. In addition to his monumental comparative grammar from 1966, his work on the Baltic and Slavonic verb convincingly demonstrated the close historical connections and interrelationships among the Baltic, Slavonic languages and Germanic languages. In his work on Slavonic accents from 1952, he noted that the Slav and Baltic accent system originally had been identical and that the differences are due to later, secondary changes. His research on Balto-Slavic comparative accentology culminated with work Slavonic Accentuation (Oslo, 1957) which, according to Kortlandt, "...marked an era in the study of the subject. The importance of this book can hardly be overestimated." Stang proved in this work that

1. de Saussure's law did not operate in Slavic
2. the neoacute is due to a retraction of the ictus from a stressed jer or from a non-initial vowel with falling intonation
3. the neo-circumflex was not the result of a Common Slavic development

Furthermore, he demonstrated that

1. the acute is restricted to paradigms with fixed stress
2. the neoacute is characteristic of paradigms where the next syllable is stressed in other forms
3. the circumflex occurs on the first syllable of paradigms with final stress in other forms

In this way Stang replaced the classical doctrine, which derived the stress pattern of a paradigm from the intonations of the root vowel and the ending, by a doctrine which derives the intonation of the root vowel, when accented, from the stress pattern of the paradigm.

Stang also published several important contributions to comparative Indo-European linguistics. His contributions include Stang's law, a Proto-Indo-European phonological rule which was named after him.

== Recognition ==
He was a member of the Norwegian Academy of Science and Letters from 1932, as well as the Royal Danish Academy of Sciences and Letters and the Royal Swedish Society of Sciences in Uppsala. He was president and vice president (the position alternates) of the former organization between 1964 and 1971. He was decorated as a Knight, First Class of the Royal Norwegian Order of St. Olav in 1970. He died in July 1977 in Kirkenes.

== Bibliography ==
- Die westrussische Kanzleisprache des Grossfürstentums Litauen. I kommisjon hos Jacob Dybwad, Oslo, 1935
- Die altrussische Urkundensprache der Stadt Polozk. J. Dybwad, Oslo, 1939
- Das slavische und baltische Verbum. I kommisjon hos J. Dybwad, Oslo, 1942
- Slavonic accentuation. Universitetsforlaget, Oslo 1957
- La langue du livre "Uchenie i khitrost ratnago stroeniia piekhotnykh liudei", 1647: une monographie linguistique. I kommisjon hos J. Dybwad, Oslo, 1952
- Forelesninger over russisk språkhistorie. Universitetsforlaget, Oslo, 1969
- Opuscula linguistica. Ausgewählte Aufsätze und Abhandlungen. Universitetsforlaget, Oslo, 1970
- Lexikalische Sonderübereinstimmungen zwischen dem Slavischen, Baltischen und Germanischen. Universitetsforlaget, Oslo, 1972
- Vergleichende Grammatik der baltischen Sprachen. Universitetsforlaget, Oslo, 1966, 1975
- Ergänzungsband: Register, Addenda und Corrigenda zur vergleichenden Grammatik der baltischen Sprachen. Universitetsforlaget, Oslo, 1975
- Litauish kliáutis - Altnordisch hljóta

In collaboration with other authors

- Stang, Christian S, Krag, Erik, Gallis, Arne: Festskrift til professor Olaf Broch på hans 80-årsdag fra venner og elever. I kommisjon hos J. Dybwad, Oslo, 1947.
- Stang, Christian S og Broch, Olaf: Russiske aktstykker fra det 17de århundrede til Finnmarks og Kolahalvøens historie. Oslo 1961.
- Stang, Christian S og Ruke-Dravina, Velta: Donum Balticum. To professor Christian S. Stang on the occasion of his seventieth birthday, 15 March 1970. Almqvist & Wiksell, Stockholm, 1970.
