= Metatony =

In linguistics, metatony refers to the change of nature of accent (its intonation, or tone), usually within the same syllable. When the accent also changes its syllable, the process is called metataxis. Metataxis can also be analyzed as a combination of accent movement and metatony. The term is usually used when referring to accentual developments in the history of Baltic and Slavic languages which exhibited numerous such developments, representing the accentual equivalent of sound change.

== Slavic metatony ==
In South Slavic languages (Serbo-Croatian and Slovene) Proto-Slavic old acute accent ⟨ő⟩ was shortened. Its direct reflex is the short falling accent ⟨ȍ⟩ in standard Serbo-Croatian, whereas standard Slovene has long rising accent ⟨ó⟩ with younger length.

- Common Slavic *bra̋trъ "brother" > Serbo-Croatian brȁt/бра̏т, Slovene bràt

In all Serbo-Croatian and Slovene dialects, in nominative singular of o- and i-stems the stem-final syllable of accent paradigm c words is lengthened. For monsyllabics this amounts to lengthening of short circumflex accent ⟨ȍ⟩ to long circumflex ⟨ȏ⟩:

- Common Slavic *bȍgъ "god" > Serbo-Croatian bȏg/бо̑г, Slovene bóg

== Slavic metataxis ==
During the Proto-Slavic period the so-called neoacute accent was created by accent retraction owing to the reduction and ultimately loss of weak yers. There were two forms - ⟨ò⟩ the short neoacute, and ⟨õ⟩ the long neoacute. Short and long neoacute are traditionally marked with two different symbols, even though we're dealing with the same prosodeme on short and long vowels, respectively. Neoacute is traditionally reconstructed as a rising intonation on the basis of Slovene and Russian, and the description of dialectal Serbo-Croatian (Chakavian) ⟨õ⟩ as a rising tone. Short neoacute has a distinct reflex in Slovak and some Russian dialects.

== Baltic metatony ==
In Aukštaitian Lithuanian dialects a metatony occurred as a reflex of Balto-Slavic acute accent which is generally assumed to be a rising tone, and which was changed to a falling tone in Lithuanian. The new accent is also marked with an acute accent mark, but its nature has changed from rising to falling. This change, usually called Lithuanian metatony, is absent in Žemaitian dialects of Lithuanian where Balto-Slavic accented acute is reflected as a broken tone.
