= Dybo's law =

Common Slavic accent law

Dybo's law, or Dybo–Illich-Svitych's law, is a Common Slavic accent law named after Soviet accentologists Vladimir Dybo and Vladislav Illich-Svitych. It was posited to explain the occurrence of nouns and verbs in Slavic languages which are invariantly accented on the inflectional ending. The latter is seen as an innovation from the original Proto-Balto-Slavic accent system, in which nouns and verbs either had invariable accent on the root, or "mobile" accent which could alternate between root and ending in the inflectional paradigm.

== Overview ==
According to the law, the accent was shifted rightward from a non-acute syllable (i.e. a long circumflex syllable, or a short syllable) to the following syllable if the word belonged to the fixed accentual paradigm. This produced the difference between the later accent classes A and B. The length of the previously-accented syllable remains.

The preservation of the original length is the primary source of pre-tonic length in the later Slavic languages (e.g. Serbo-Croatian), because inherited Balto-Slavic vowel length had previously been shortened in pre-tonic syllables, without a change in vowel quality. This caused the phonemicization of the previously automatic quality variations between short and long vowels — e.g. short *o vs. originally long *a.

== Examples ==
Word-final syllables with the Balto-Slavic acute register were shortened and then lost the acute, before the time Dybo's law operated. It could then be lengthened again by Van Wijk's law, producing a long non-acuted vowel. Therefore, when the accent shifted onto a final syllable, the new accent was either circumflex or short, but never acute.

When the new accent was circumflex or fell on a yer, the accent was subsequently shifted leftward again by Ivšić's law (a.k.a. Stang's law), resulting in a neoacute accent:

- Early Slavic *pírstu "finger" > MCS *pь̑rstъ > (Dybo's law) *pь̄rstъ̀ > (Ivšić's law) LCS *pь̃rstъ > obsolete Russian perst, GEN.SG perstá
- Early Slavic *kátu "cat" > MCS *kȍtъ > (Dybo's law) *kotъ̀ > (Ivšić's law) LCS *kõtъ> Russian kot, GEN.SG kotá
- Early Slavic *váljāˀ "will" > (loss of acute) MCS *vȏlja > (Van Wijk's law) *vȏljā > (Dybo's law) *vōljȃ > (Ivšić's law) LCS *võlja > Russian vólja, Slovak vôľa (note, Slovak ô [u̯o] specifically reflects neoacute)

When the new accent was short (either from an original short vowel or a shortened acute) and Van Wijk's law did not apply, then Ivšić's law had no effect, and the accent remained on the second syllable:

- Early Slavic *génāˀ "woman" > (loss of acute) Middle Common Slavic (MCS) *žȅna > (Dybo's law) Late Common Slavic (LCS) *ženà > Chakavian ženȁ
- Latin vīnum "wine" > MCS *vȋno > (Dybo's law) LCS *vīnò > Serbo-Croatian víno (with long rising accent, indicating neoshtokavian accent retraction from the following syllable)

The acute was preserved in non-final syllables, however. Thus, when shifting onto a non-final syllable, all three accents (acute, circumflex or short) were possible, depending on the state of the syllable before Dybo's law operated. Ivšić's law in turn operated on forms where the new accent was circumflex, but not where it was acute or short. Compare:

- Early Slavic infinitive *prásīˀtī > MCS *prósīˀtī > (Dybo's law) LCS *prosi̋ti.
- Early Slavic 3sg. present *prásīti > MCS *prósītь > (Dybo's law) LCS *prosȋtь > (Ivšić's law) *pròsitь.

Dybo's law was entirely prevented in cases of initial accent in words belonging to the mobile accent paradigm. In such forms, Meillet's law resulted in loss of the acute register on the root, so that all initial-accented mobile forms were in principle susceptible to Dybo's law. Jasanoff argues that such forms had a special "left-marginal accent", which was not affected by Dybo's law the way the "lexical accent" of fixed-accent paradigms was. Thus:

- Early Slavic *vádān "water" ACC.SG > MCS *vȍdǫ > LCS *vȍdǫ > Russian vódu, SC vȍdu
- Early Slavic *gálˀvān "head" ACC.SG > (Meillet's law) MCS *gȏlvǫ > LCS *gȏlvǫ > Russian gólovu, SC glȃvu

== Valence theory ==
In the valence theory, followed by the Moscow accentological school but otherwise not generally accepted, Dybo–Illich-Svitych's law is not considered single one-time change, but rather a succession of changes. It is described as a series of rightward accentual shifts in various Late Proto-Slavic dialects, with successive removal of accent drift prohibitions. There are two prohibitions, common to all Late Proto-Slavic dialects:

- Prohibition on the right-side accent shift from syllables with a dominant acute – *ˈža̋ba̋ AP (a), *ˈja̋goda̋ AP (a).
- Prohibition on the shift of the accent on syllables with a dominant circumflex – *ˈslũžĩtь AP (b₁), *ˈnòsĩtь AP (b₁), *ˈnòžĩkъ AP (b).

Early Proto-Slavic (most likely Balto-Slavic) is also considered a shift of accent on internal syllables, as well as on some endings with a dominant aсutе – *žèˈna̋ AP (b), *tvòˈri̋ti AP (b₂), *slũˈži̋ti AP (b₁). This process refers to the Fortunatov–de Saussure's law.

=== Dialects of the III group ===
Dialects of the III group are associated with the tribal division of Slovenes (Sclaveni in the work of Jordanes). In part, this can be traced to the historically attested self-names of speakers of this type of dialects: Slovenes, Slovaks, Slovincians, Novgorod Ilmen Slavs. Archaeologists associate the Prague-Korchak culture with the Slovenes and with its continuation the Luka-Raikovetskaya culture, which currently contains Belarusian and Ukrainian Polesians dialects. Apparently, the culture associated with the tribal unification of the Severians dates back to this same culture.

Commons phenomena:

- Shift of accent from long syllables to short syllables.
- Prohibition on shifting accent from long syllables to subsequent long syllables or Križanić's law.
- Shift of accent from short syllables to internal and final short syllables and internal syllables with a recessive acute.

Non-commons phenomena:

- Prohibition on new shifts of accent in the Styrian dialect group and Prekmurje dialect, the Kajkavian zagorski dialect.
- Shift of accent from short syllables to subsequent long syllables in the Lower Carniolan dialect group, Old Croatian dialect of Križanić, Chakavian subdialects of the Islands of Hvar and Brač.
- Shift of accent from short syllables to subsequent middle long syllables, but does not shift to final long syllables in Ukrainian and Belarusian Polesia subdialects, Southern Russian dialects and Ilmen-Slovenian Russian subdialects.

The III group
| | *dòbrȍta | *tvòrîlo | *sǫ̃dîlo | *gròbȃ | *mǫ̃drȍstь | *kǫ̃tȃ | *tvòrȋtь | *sèlā̋ | *sǫ̃dȋte | *krĩdlā̋ | *nòsĩtь | *ža̋ba̋ | *pra̋vi̋ti |
|---|---|---|---|---|---|---|---|---|---|---|---|---|---|
| IIIА | *dobro̍ta | *tvori̍lo | *sǫdi̍lo | *groba̍ | *mǫdro̍stь | *kǫta̍ | *tvo̍ritь | *se̍la | *sǫ̍dite | *kri̍dla | *no̍sitь | *ža̍ba | *pra̍viti |
| IIIB | *dobro̍ta | *tvori̍lo | *sǫdi̍lo | *groba̍ | *mǫdro̍stь | *kǫta̍ | *tvori̍tь | *se̍la | *sǫ̍dite | *kri̍dla | *no̍sitь | *ža̍ba | *pra̍viti |
| IIIC | *dobro̍ta | *tvori̍lo | *sǫdi̍lo | *groba̍ | *mǫdro̍stь | *kǫta̍ | *tvori̍tь | *sela̍ | *sǫ̍dite | *kri̍dla | *no̍sitь | *ža̍ba | *pra̍viti |
| IIID | *dobro̍ta | *tvori̍lo | *sǫdi̍lo | *groba̍ | *mǫdro̍stь | *kǫta̍ | *tvori̍tь | *sela̍ | *sǫ̍dite | *kri̍dla | *no̍sitь | *ža̍ba | *pra̍viti |

== Comparison with Fortunatov–de Saussure's law ==
Fortunatov–de Saussure's law is a sound law very similar to Dybo's that affected Lithuanian. Like Dybo's law, it caused a rightward shift of the accent from non-acuted syllables and a split in the original accentual paradigms. There are some differences, however:

- Dybo's law shifted the accent rightward regardless of what was in the next syllable, whereas De Saussure's law shifted it only when it was acuted.
- Dybo's law was blocked in mobile-accented words. Such words never had an acute in the first syllable as a result of Meillet's law, but they nonetheless retained the initial accent. Consequently, there was only a split into three paradigms, with the fixed-accented words splitting into paradigms a and b, but the mobile-accented words remaining unified under paradigm c.

== See also ==
- Glossary of sound laws in the Indo-European languages
