= Ivšić's law =

Common Slavic accent law

Ivšić's law (Croatian pronunciation: [ǐːʋʃit͡ɕ]), also Stang's law or Stang–Ivšić's law, is a Common Slavic accent law named after Stjepan Ivšić (1911) and Christian Schweigaard Stang (1957); the two linguists independently discovered the law in those years.

The law explains the origin of the Proto-Slavic neoacute accent occurring in the accent paradigm b as retractive from the following syllable.

== Retraction from stressed weak yer ==
During the Late Common Slavic period, the short vowels *ь and *ъ (known as yers, also written *ĭ *ŭ) developed into "strong" and "weak" variants according to Havlík's law. The accented weak variants could no longer carry an accent, which was thus retracted onto the preceding syllable. That syllable gained a rising neoacute accent. It is denoted with a tilde diacritic ⟨◌̃⟩ on historically "long" syllables (*a, *i, *u, *y, *ě, *ę, *ǫ, *VR) and with a grave accent ⟨◌̀⟩ on historically "short" syllables (*e, *o, *ь, *ъ).

In conservative Serbo-Croatian dialects of Čakavian and Old Štokavian (e.g., Slavonian), this neoacute is preserved as a separate tone, distinct from the old acute and circumflex. Ivšić designated the long neoacute in Čakavian with the same circumflex symbol as the Lithuanian circumflex due to their phonetic similarity.

Compare:

PSl. *pirstu̍ > Common Slavic *pьrstъ̍ > *pь̃rstъ (Čakavian pr̃st, Russian perst, N pl perstý)

== Retraction from medial circumflexed syllables ==
Retraction also occurred on medial long circumflexed (i.e., non-acuted) syllables; for example, on verbs in *-iti. On the basis of the attested forms nȍsīte, vrãtite Ivšić assumed the earlier forms *nosȋte, *vortȋte, which would also yield the neoacute by retracting the long circumflex accent onto the preceding syllable. This retraction is uncontroversial if the preceding syllable is long; in the case of short preceding syllables, it is generally accepted, but some argue that it is analogical to the long neoacute in individual (mostly West Slavic) languages.

Additionally, Ivšić's law explains the acute accent on certain jā-stem nouns such as sũša (Slavonian Štokavian dialects), vȍlja (with shortened neoacute).

Borrowings from other languages show that Ivšić's law operated after Dybo's law, and had the effect of partially reversing it. Compare:

- PSl. *kȁrlju 'king' (originally the name of Charlemagne) > (Dybo's law) *karlju̍ > (Ivšić's law) *kãrlju > Čakavian krãlj.

== See also ==
- Glossary of sound laws in the Indo-European languages
