= Slavic liquid metathesis and pleophony =

Common Slavic changes to liquid consonants in syllable codas

The Slavic liquid metathesis refers to the phenomenon of metathesis of liquid consonants in the Common Slavic period in the South Slavic and West Slavic area. The closely related corresponding phenomenon of pleophony (also known as polnoglasie or full vocalization) occurred in parallel in the East Slavic languages.

The change acted on syllables in which the Proto-Slavic liquid consonants *r and *l occurred in a coda position. The result of the change is dependent upon the phonological environment and accents, and it varies in different Slavic languages.

The change has been dated to the second half of the 8th century, before any Slavic languages were recorded in writing. Therefore, the change itself cannot be observed, but it can be inferred by comparing words in different Slavic languages. Evidence of the earlier state of affairs is also preserved in loanwords into and from Early Slavic as well as in cognates in other Indo-European languages, particularly Baltic languages.

== Background ==
Environments of eliminated liquid codas
Traditional	Schenker	Holzer
oRT	ăRC	aRC
TeRT	CĕRC	CeRC
ToRT	CăRC	CaRC
TьRT	CĭRC	CiRC
TъRT	CŭRC	CuRC

During the Common Slavic period, a tendency known as the law of open syllables led to a series of changes that eliminated closed syllables. By the Old Church Slavonic period, every syllable, without exception, ended in a vowel. Such changes included:

- monophthongization of diphthongs,
- loss of word-final consonants (PSl vьlkъ < PBSl *wilkás < PIE *wĺ̥kʷos),
- simplification of some medial consonant clusters (OCS tonǫti < *topnǫti), and
- formation of the nasal vowels *ǫ < *am/*an and *ę < *em/*en.

The change discussed here is part of this process, and it involved the liquid consonants, grouped under the cover symbol R, *l or *r in a coda position, in environments that are traditionally designated as in the given table. The application of the law of open syllables in such environments had different results in different Slavic dialects, and it is some of the earliest evidence for differentiation into the multitude of Slavic languages.

In some, it is the metathesis of a sequence of liquid consonants followed by a vowel, and in others, it is an insertion of another vowel. In most cases, the effect was to eliminate the syllable-final consonants *l and *r so that the law of open syllables was maintained.

== Reflexes in Slavic languages ==
=== oRT ===
Metathesis then occurred in all Slavic dialects. In South Slavic dialects (Slovene, Serbo-Croatian, Macedonian, Bulgarian) as well in Czech and Slovak, the metathesized vowel was lengthened as well.

In East Slavic and the Lechitic branch of West Slavic, the outcome was dependent upon the Proto-Slavic accent: in acuted syllables, the output was the same as in South Slavic and Czech-Slovak, but on circumflexed syllables, the metathesized vowel did not lengthen.

Area	Acuted syllable		Circumflexed syllable	
Area	Traditional	Schenker/Holzer	Traditional	Schenker/Holzer
South Slavic, Czech and Slovak	CS *oRT > CS *raT	PSl. *aRC > PSl. *RāC > CS *RaC	CS *oRT > CS *raT	PSl. *aRC > PSl. *RāC > CS *RaC
North Slavic	CS *oRT > CS *raT	PSl. *aRC > PSl. *RāC > CS *RaC	CS *oRT > CS *roT	PSl. *aRC > PSl. *RaC > CS *RoC

PSl. = Proto-Slavic proper, the stage before both the loss of distinctive vowel length and the change *a > *o
CS = Common Slavic, Late Proto-Slavic, the last reconstructable ancestor of all Slavic languages

Compare the following reflexes:

Accent	Proto-Slavic reconstruction	South Slavic, Czech and Slovak							North Slavic					
Accent	Proto-Slavic reconstruction	OCS	Slovene	Serbo-Croatian	Bulgarian	Macedonian	Czech	Slovak	Russian	Belarusian	Ukrainian	Polish	Low. Sorbian	Upp. Sorbian
Acute	PSl. *ardla > CS *őrdlo "plough"	ralo	rálo	rȁlo / ра̏ло	ра́ло (rálo)	рало (ralo)	rádlo	radlo	ра́ло (rálo)	ра́ла (rála)	ра́ло (rálo)	radło	radło	radło
Circumflex	PSl. *arstu > CS *ȍrstъ "growth"	rastŭ	rȃst	rȃst / ра̑ст	ръст (răst)	раст (rast)	růst	rast	рост (rost)	рост (rost)	ріст (rist)	wzrost		róst

If the syllable was not acuted, the metathesis in West and East Slavic occurred without the lengthening so EPSl. *a retains its short quantity and yields /o/; compare EPSl. *ȍlkъtь ‘elbow’ > Serbo-Croatian lȁkat but Czech loket.

=== TeRT and ToRT ===
Word-medially, on the other hand, there were three primary outcomes:

1. In Czech, Slovak and South Slavic, the metathesis occurred with lengthening: Proto-Slavic (PS) CeRC CaRC > CRēC CRāC > Common Slavic (CS) CRěC CRaC.
2. In the rest of West Slavic, the metathesis occurred but without lengthening: PS CeRC CaRC > CReC CRaC > CS CReC CRoC.
3. In East Slavic, a vowel was inserted to break up the RC sequence (pleophony): PS CeRC CaRC > CeReC CaRaC > CS CeReC CoRoC.

As a result of dialect-specific changes occurring before and after the cluster resolution (metathesis/pleophony), the outcomes in various languages are diverse and complex. For example, in North-West Lechitic (northern Kashubian, Slovincian, Pomeranian and Polabian) and East Slavic, *CalC and *CelC merged into *CalC prior to cluster resolution:

- In Polish and Sorbian, the metathesis occurred without lengthening: Polish brzeg, mleko, groch, młot as opposed to OCS brěgъ, mlěko, Slovene gràh, OCS mlatъ.
- In North-West Lechitic, *CalC and *CelC yielded ClŭC (Polabian glåvă ‘head’, å < ъ), *CerC > CreC (without lengthening, as in Polish) while in *CarC, ar becomes ŭr, just like word-initially under acute (Polabian råmą ‘arm’ < *rъmę < *armę), but it did not undergo the metathesis. Compare Polabian porsą, Slovincian părsą and Kashubian gard (often in toponymics like Białogard) to OCS gradъ (note that unchanged ar in *gardŭ would have yielded or in Pomeranian).
- In Czech and Slovak, word-medial metathesis occurred with lengthening just like in South Slavic: Czech mlat, hrách, Polish młot, groch with an /o/.
- The East Slavic languages have pleophonic *CarC > CoroC, *CerC > CereC and *CalC/*CelC > ColoC: Russian górod, béreg, mólot, molokó.

== Complete and incomplete metathesis ==
If the liquid metathesis is complete only if it occurred with the corresponding vowel lengthening, the metathesis occurred completely in South Slavic and partially in Slovak and in non-word-initial position in the whole Czecho-Slovak area. The complete metathesis has been operational in all Slavic languages for acuted syllables. For word-initial non-acuted syllables, there was no lengthening except in South Slavic and, partially, Slovak.

As mentioned, the complete metathesis occurred in South Slavic, in Czech and Slovak and in Polish and Sorbian, without lengthening. In North-West Lechitic, the metathesis did not occur even for *CarC syllables. In East Slavic, pleophony yielded *CVRC > CVRVC. The reflex of *l in North-West Lechitic and East Slavic is always "hard".

== First and second metathesis ==
Since the reflexes of acuted word-initial *ar- and *al- are the same in all Slavic dialects, they must have changed before the syllables ending with a liquid, which have different reflexes. One can thus distinguish the first and the second metathesis of liquids.

== Dating ==
From Slavic evidence alone, the change cannot be dated precisely because no Slavic languages had yet committed to writing. However, words may have been documented from contemporary non-Slavic languages, and words may also have been borrowed into Slavic from other languages. That makes it possible to narrow down the time that the change occurred.

The liquid metathesis occurred in the Common Slavic era. It took place after or was still productive until the end of the 8th century. The name of Charlemagne, who died in 814, underwent the change:

- Old High German Karl (Note: Karl is not only a proper noun but also a common noun and then means "adult male". It is a normalised form, based on the Old East Franconian dialect. The common noun is also attested as charal in Old Upper German, with an epenthetic vowel, for example in the Old Alemannic rendering of the Rule of Saint Benedict. That may be the origin of the intrusive vowel in Carolus, the Latinised version of the name, but the Slavic process seems to be unconnected.) > PSl. *karl′u (Note: The rendering of OHG l as PSl. *l′ is regular; the reason is that PSl. plain *l was dark, while OHG l was a normal [l], which was identified with the PSl. palatalised liquid *l′.) > Common Slavic *korl′ь > Russian король (koról′), Polish król, Slovak kráľ, Serbo-Croatian krȃlj

On the other hand, the change had already been completed in the earliest Old Church Slavonic documents. That implies that the change was completed, at least in the dialects of Bulgaria and of Macedonia, in no later than the 9th century, when the documents were written. There are, however, some attested unmetathised words in OCS such as ал(ъ)дии, a doublet of the metathised ладии.

There are also glosses of Slavic words in foreign-language sources. Earlier sources show no effect of liquid metathesis, such as when the late-8th-century Greek chronicler Theophanes the Confessor writes Slavic names as Ἀρδάγαστος (Ardágastos) and Δαργαμηρός (Dargamērós). Old Church Slavonic versions of the names, with the metathesis applied, would be Radogostъ and Dragoměrъ. Liquid metathesis is also seen in various borrowings preserved in toponymics; Latin Arba > Serbo-Croatian Rȃb, Latin Albōna > Serbo-Croatian Làbīn, Latin Scardōna > Serbo-Croatian Skràdīn, Proto-Germanic *albī > Czech Labe, etc.

== Interpretation ==
It has been suggested that East Slavic preserved the previous state of affairs, that the vowel was inserted in Common Slavic and that it was only subsequently lost in all dialects except in East Slavic, preceding the liquid. The exact development would thus be in Serbo-Croatian and Bulgarian as follows:

- PSl. *bardā 'beard' > *Common Slavic *bar^{a}dā (*bor^{o}da) > *b^{a}radā (*b^{o}roda) SCr. bráda, Blg. bradá.

== See also ==
- Proto-Slavic language
