= Hirt's law =

Balto-Slavic accent-retraction sound change

Hirt's law or Hirt–Illich-Svitych's law, named after Hermann Hirt, who originally postulated it in 1895, is a Balto-Slavic sound law that triggered the retraction of the accent (or metatony in the valence theory) under certain conditions.

== Overview ==
Under Hirt's law, a non-initial accent was retracted to a non-ablauting vowel, if it was followed by a consonantal (non-syllabic) laryngeal that closed the preceding syllable. The retraction did not take place if the laryngeal did not immediately follow the syllable nucleus, i.e. if the nucleus contained a vocalic or sonorant diphthong such as ey or en. However, the retraction did take place onto a syllabic sonorant, showing that Hirt's law applied before the epenthesis of the high vowels *i and *u before syllabic sonorants.

Hirt's law followed the creation of the distinction between fixed and mobile accentual paradigms in early Balto-Slavic. In two-syllable forms (root plus vocalic ending), only mobile paradigms had forms with non-initial stress, so Hirt's law could only operate on them. In longer stems, both fixed and mobile paradigms were affected.

== In fixed paradigms ==
Hirt's law only affected fixed-accent forms if they had three or more syllables, since fixed-accent paradigms could not have forms with a final accent, only mobile paradigms could. The result was a straightforward shifting of the columnar accent one syllable to the left, with the paradigm remaining fixed.

== In mobile paradigms ==
In mobile paradigms, Hirt's law affected the final-accented forms. This is visible in disyllabic endings of the ā-stem nouns, which have penultimate accent where the equivalent endings of other inflection classes have final accent. Late Common Slavic reflects this as a distinction of neoacute (from an original final accent, by Ivšić's law) versus normal acute (from an original penultimate accent).

In the locative plural:

- In the ā-stems: Pre-Balto-Slavic *-áHsu > (by oxytonesis) *-aHsú > (by Hirt's law) *-áHsu > Proto-Balto-Slavic *-ā́ˀsu > Late Common Slavic *-àxъ > Slovene and Chakavian -àh, with a short vowel resulting from a Slavic acute.
- In the o-stems: Pre-Balto-Slavic *-óyšu > (by oxytonesis) *-oyšú > Proto-Balto-Slavic *-aišú > Middle Common Slavic *-ěxъ́ > (by Ivšić's law) Late Common Slavic *-ě̃xъ > Slovene -éh, Chakavian -íh, both with a long vowel resulting from a Slavic neoacute.

In cases of two-syllable forms (such as the nominative singular of many nouns) where the accent was retracted from the second onto the first syllable by Hirt's law, such forms would have stood alongside the older, existing initial-accented forms in a mobile paradigm. This disrupted the normal accentuation of mobile words, and was resolved in one of two ways:

1. Convert the paradigm to a fixed-accent paradigm, by shifting all remaining non-initial accents onto the first syllable.
  - Pre-Balto-Slavic *duHmós "smoke" > (by Hirt's law, then conversion to fixed accent) *dúHmos > Proto-Balto-Slavic *dū́ˀmas > Lithuanian dū́mai (AP 1), Late Common Slavic *dỳmъ (AP a)
  - Pre-Balto-Slavic *griHwáH "?" > (by Hirt's law, then conversion to fixed accent) *gríHwaH > Proto-Balto-Slavic *grī́ˀwāˀ > Latvian grĩva, Late Common Slavic *grìva (AP a)
2. Analogically restore the normal mobile accentuation, by moving the accent back from the first onto the second syllable and thus undoing Hirt's law.
  - Pre-Balto-Slavic *suHnús "son" > (by Hirt's law) *súHnus > (analogical restoration) *suHnús > Proto-Balto-Slavic *sūˀnús > Lithuanian sūnùs (AP 3), Late Common Slavic *sy̑nъ (AP c)
  - Pre-Balto-Slavic *giHwós "alive" > (by Hirt's law) *gíHwos > (analogical restoration) *giHwós > Proto-Balto-Slavic *gīˀwás > Lithuanian gývas (AP 3), Late Common Slavic *žȋvъ (AP c)

Here, Lithuanian accent paradigm 1 and Slavic accent paradigm a reflect a Balto-Slavic fixed-accent paradigm, while Lithuanian AP 3 and Slavic AP c reflect a Balto-Slavic mobile paradigm. The Latvian sustained tone ˜ is an indirect reflex of a fixed-accent paradigm, contrasting with the broken tone ˆ which would reflect a mobile paradigm. Among the forms that remained mobile, only Lithuanian sūnùs preserves the inherited final accent. In Slavic, the paradigms preserve the mobile accent, but the original nominative singular forms were replaced by the accusative singular, which was identical other than the accent.

== Valence theory ==
In the valence theory of Indo-European accentuation, the concept of “the retraction of the accent” is meaningless for describing the Balto-Slavic accent system with automatic placement of ictus. This means that in fact Hirt's law describes metatony “recessive acute ⇒ metatonic acute”. In morphophonological terms, this Balto-Slavic metatony is formulated as follows: Metatony “recessive acute ⇒ metatonic acute” occurs in the syllable of a recessive morpheme, if followed by a second dominant syllable. In tonological terms, this is the conversion of a low laryngealized syllable tone into a rising-falling laryngealized syllable tone. While the secondary dominant syllable was caused by tone assimilation by Indo-European metatony, which is in an additional positional distribution.

The fact, that metatony is not the result of the retraction of the accent is indicated by inlautend metatony with a dominant n-infix: Proto-Slavic *sę̋detь (AP a), cf. *sěditь̀ (AP c); *bǫ̋detь (AP a), cf. *by̋ti and aorist *by̑ (AP c).

Metatony acts only on the historical Early Balto-Slavic mobile accent paradigm with a recessive acute, thereby forming accent paradigms with extremely complex accent curves. Such curves have always been aligned, as a result of which one can see lexicalized variants in the form of doublets and triplets, distributed across dialects:

- Proto-Indo-European *suH_{(−)}-nús_{(±)} (“son”) → (by metatony) Proto-Balto-Slavic *sū́n_{(±)}-ùs_{(±)} → Common Slavic *sy̑nъ (AP c); Old Lithuanian súnus (AP 1) ⇔ Lithuanian sūnùs (AP 3);
- Proto-Indo-European *meh₂_{(−)}-tḗr_{(±)} (“mother”) → (by metatony) Proto-Balto-Slavic *mā́t_{(±)}-ē̃_{(±)} → Common Slavic *ma̋ti (AP a); Lithuanian mótė (AP 1) ⇔ Lithuanian dial. motė̃ (AP 3);
- Proto-Indo-European *deh₂i_{(−)}-wḗr_{(±)} (“brother-in-law”) → (by metatony) Proto-Balto-Slavic *dā́iw_{(±)}-ē̃_{(±)} → Common Slavic *dě̋verь (AP a) ⇔ *dě̑verь (AP c); Lithuanian díeveris (AP 1) ⇔ dieverìs (AP 3).

Borrowing a syllable tone from other cases:

- Proto-Balto-Slavic *krē̂sl_{(−)}-ȁn_{(−)} (“arm-chair”) → Common Slavic *krě̋slo, borrowing from nom.-acc. pl. *krě̋sla, with metatony from Proto-Balto-Slavic *krḗsl_{(±)}-ā́_{(±)}.

Reflexes not related to Hirt's law, but caused by the Indo-European metatony “recessive acute ⇒ metatonic circumflex”:

1. In the locative plural:
  - Proto-Balto-Slavic *gâr_{(−)}-ā̃_{(±)}-sù_{(+)} (“mountain”) → Common Slavic *gorãxъ (AP c) → Czech horách, Chakavian gorãh, Old Polish -åch.
2. In the illative plural:
  - Proto-Balto-Slavic *gâlw_{(−)}-ā̃_{(±)}-sù_{(+)}-nā́_{(+)} (“head”) → *galvõsuna → (by Leskien–Otrębski–Smoczyński's rule) Lithuanian galvósna (AP 3) → (falling away) galvós(n).

== See also ==
- Glossary of sound laws in the Indo-European languages
