= Meillet's law =

Common Slavic accent law

Meillet's law (/meɪ.ˈjeɪz/ may-YAYZ) is a Common Slavic accent law, named after the French Indo-Europeanist Antoine Meillet, who discovered it.

== Overview ==
According to the law, Slavic words have a circumflex on the root vowel (i.e., the first syllable of a word), if that word had a mobile accent paradigm in Proto-Slavic and Proto-Balto-Slavic, regardless of whether the root had the Balto-Slavic acute register. Compare:

- acute on Lithuanian gálvą, accusative singular of mobile-paradigm galvà 'head', vs. circumflex in Slavic (Serbo-Croatian glȃvu, Slovenian glavô, Russian gólovu)
- acute on Lithuanian sū́nų, accusative singular of mobile-paradigm sūnùs 'son', versus circumflex in Slavic (Serbo-Croatian sȋna, Slovenian sȋnu)

Meillet's law should most probably be interpreted as polarization of accentual mobility in Slavic, due to which accent in the words with mobile accentuation had to be on the first mora, instead on the first syllable (in places in paradigm with initial accent). This is the reason in the words belonging to mobile paradigms in Slavic accent shifts from the first syllable to the proclitic, e.g. Russian accusative singular of mobile-paradigm gólovu, but ná golovu 'on the head', Serbo-Croatian glȃvu, but nȁ glāvu.

== In verbs ==
Meillet's law appears to not have taken effect in the infinitive of verbs. This form normally had ending accent in mobile paradigms, but some Balto-Slavic mobile verbs had root accent in the infinitive as a result of Hirt's law. In Slavic, these infinitives retained their acute accentuation, thus creating *gry̋zti next to the present *gryzèšь. Such verbs appear synchronically to be a mixture of accent paradigms a and c.

== See also ==
- Glossary of sound laws in the Indo-European languages
