= De Saussure's law =

Proto-Balto-Slavic sound law

De Saussure's law, sometimes known as the Fortunatov–de Saussure law, is an accentological law discovered independently by the Russian linguist Filipp Fortunatov (1895) and the Swiss linguist Ferdinand de Saussure (1896). It was probably only operational in Lithuanian, though others have argued for its wider applicabiliity.

== Overview ==
According to Fortunatov's 1895 theory, the verbosity in the "Proto-Lithuanian-Slavic" language shifts the stress from the preceding syllable if the articulation did not have an extension. Thus, in the word for "beard" in Russian and Lithuanian, the accent shifted from the root to the ending since the root had an intermittent length, and the ending is the extended length. However, in the word воро́на "crow" in Russian and Lithuanian the accent was preserved in the root since it is elongated. In Russian and Lithuanian the word bar̃zdą "beard" had no accent shift since the ending of the accusative case has an intermittent length.

According to de Saussure's formulation of 1896, the accent in Lithuanian was regularly shifted to the next syllable when it fell on a syllable with a circumflex intonation, only if there was another with an acute intonation after this syllable.

=== Valence theory ===
According to the formulation of the Moscow Accentological School, in the Early Proto-Slavic (most likely Balto-Slavic) languages, accent shifted from dominant short and dominant circumflex syllables to syllables with an internal dominant acute, and there was no shift to both recessive aсutе and long syllables that had a circumflex intonation.

For the Lithuanian language, Vladimir Dybo introduced a clarification to this law: "The accent was shifted from the circumflex to the next final acute. Without prohibitions. And the next, not the final acute, only if both syllables have the same accentuation valence". This clarification explains the forms of the type dat.pl. viẽtoms "place".

Willem Vermeer criticizes this clarification of Dybo precisely in connection with the forms of the dative plural:

Assuming that de Saussure's law as traditionally understood operated regularly in these forms, yielding *vietóms [ʽместам'] etc., analogical restoration of stem stress is a completely natural reaction of the system, given the fact that in all other stem classes accent type (2) has stem stress in these forms. <…> Restoration of stem stress in Dpl <…> is so banal that Stang <…> sees no need to go to the trouble of explaining it.

Criticizing Vermeer, Sergei Bolotov and Mikhail Oslon reject his explanation by means of a analogical restoration and try to derive a certain rule explaining the occurrence of the acute. They also notice that Christian Stang sees a need to go to the trouble of explaining it, (Note: See in Stang, Christian S. (1966, 1975), Vergleichende Grammatik der baltischen Sprachen. Oslo: Universitetsforlaget, pages 289‒290) contrary to what Vermeer wrote.

Classically in the dat.pl. of ā-stems, acute is usually postulated. The idea of the acuteness of this ending seems to originate, among other things, from the Slavic correspondence, cf. dat.pl. *golva̋mъ, as well as from the segment composition: *-ah₂-mos. At the same time, however, it is obvious that the other two plural endings, namely: inst.pl. galvomìs ~ *golva̋mi and iness.pl. galvosè and dial. galvosù ~ *golva̋xъ do not converge in Lithuanian and Slavic at the place of accent. This discrepancy also undermines the comparison dat.pl. galvóms ~ *golva̋mъ. Thus, probably for the first time, Thomas Olander drew attention to the non-acute of the previous syllable:

[I]t is perhaps more likely that the acute pre-LI *-āˀ- first became circumflex by analogy with the other stems and then was subject to Saussure's Law.

The assumption of a circumflex on this *-ā- explains the forms of the type viẽtoms, viẽtomis, viẽtose, viẽtom, but not *vietóms, *vietómis, *vietóse, *vietóm, thus de Saussure's law should not be expected here, whereas acuteness in mobile paradigms is secondary (for example in dat. pl. žẽmėms (2) "land" ~ žvaigždė́ms (4) "star"). Later it was shown that the appearance of the "secondary" acute is associated with the vowel apocope caused by the Leskien–Otrębski–Smoczyński's rule. The appearance of the circumflex in place of the probable acuteness (from *-ah₂-) is due to Nikolaev's metatony, and not to the Olander's analogy. Presumably, this can be confirmed by Slavic data, where there are variants with circumflex. For example, in Czech (-ám, -ách), Chakavian (-ãh) and Polish (-åch).

Subsequently the Moscow Accentological School, after a thorough analysis of imaginary and marginal exceptions to the de Saussure's law, cancelled Dybo's clarification and introduced a reduction in the endings of primary cases or Leskien–Otrębski–Smoczyński's rule.

==== Leskien–Otrębski–Smoczyński rule ====
With the apocope of the stressed final syllable, a circumflex appears after an unstressed short monophthong (VRV́[C]# → VŔ[C]#):

- acc.sg. tavè → taũ "you";
- nom.sg. anàs → añs "he";
- acc.sg. manè → mañ "me";
- instr.sg. akimì → akim̃ "eye";
- instr.du. *akimV̀ → akim̃ "eye";
- iness.sg. sūnujè → sūnuj̃ "son";
- iness.sg. kamè → kam̃ "where";
- iness.sg.m. baltamè → baltam̃ "white";
- instr.pl. akimìs → akim̃s → akim̃ "eye".

With the apocope of the stressed final syllable, a circumflex appears after an unstressed long monophthong (VVRV́[C]# → VV́[R]#):

- akysè → akỹs;
- akyjè → akỹj → akỹ;
- *galvomV̀ → galvõm;
- žolėjè → žolė̃j → žolė̃;
- galvojè → galvõj → galvõ;
- galvomìs → galvõms → galvõm.

With the apocope of the stressed final syllable, a circumflex appears after an unstressed diphthong (VVRV́# → VV́[R]#):

- sudievù (v → u) → sudiẽu → sudiẽ;
- dienà → diẽn → diẽ;
- pirmà → pir̃m.

With the apocope of the unstressed final syllable, an acute appears after a stressed short monophthong (V́RV[C]# → V́R[C]#):

- jùmus → jùms;
- *akìmV → akìm;
- mùmus → mùms;
- *akìmus → akìms;
- *žiedàmV → žiedám;
- *žiedàmus → žiedáms.

With the apocope of the unstressed final syllable, an acute appears after a stressed long monophthong (VV́RVC# → V́VRC#):

- *jõmus → jóms;
- *baltõmus → baltóms;
- *galvõmus → galvóms.

See also: Leskien's law

== Opposition ==
Christian Stang, Frederik Kortlandt, Rick Derksen, and many other linguists deny the operation of the Fortunatov–de Saussure's law in Proto-Slavic. Jerzy Kuryłowicz did not deny the operation of the law, but he rejected the tonological interpretation of the movement of stress on the endings: he believed that the shift of stress from circumflex syllables to the ending of the word is not caused by the acute nature of the endings, but their reduction.

== See also ==
- Dybo's law
- Glossary of sound laws in the Indo-European languages
