= Havlík's law =

Slavic rhythmic law

Havlík's law is a Slavic rhythmic law dealing with the reduced vowels (known as yers or jers) in Proto-Slavic. It is named for the Czech scholar Antonín Havlík (1855–1925), who determined the pattern in 1889. While Havlík's law was a precursor to the loss of the yers, that process is part of the individual history of the various Slavic languages. Havlík's law was already in effect at the end of the Common Slavic period, and ended the era of the "law of open syllables", a major phonological innovation of the Common Slavic period.

== Strong and weak yers ==
The front and back yer come from the Early Proto-Slavic and Proto-Balto-Slavic short high vowels */i/ and */u/, respectively. As vowels, they played a role in the law of open syllables, which states that every syllable must end in a vowel. Old Church Slavonic, for example, had no closed syllables at all.

Word-final yers, which were abundant, including in declensional patterns, were reduced in length to ultrashort, or "weak", variants (/ɪ̆/ and /ʊ̆/). These weak yers were then often elided. In words with multiple yers, the weak variants were not limited to word-final position.

Havlík's law describes the pattern in which weak and strong yers occur. Counting from the last yer in a word, the final yer is weak, the previous yer is strong, the yer before it is weak once again, etc., until a full vowel is reached, and then the pattern is started again with alternating weak then strong yers.

== See also ==
- Glossary of sound laws in the Indo-European languages
