= Yer =

Letters of the Cyrillic script

A yer is either of two letters in Cyrillic alphabets, ъ (ѥръ, jerŭ) and ь (ѥрь, jerĭ). The Glagolitic alphabet used, as respective counterparts, the letters (Ⱏ) and (Ⱐ). They originally represented phonemically the "ultra-short" vowels in Slavic languages, including Old Church Slavonic.

In all modern Slavic languages, they either evolved into various "full" vowels or disappeared, in some cases causing the palatalization of adjacent consonants. The only natural Slavic language that still uses "ъ" as a vowel sign (pronounced /ɤ/) is Bulgarian, but in many cases, it corresponds to an earlier ѫ (big yus), originally pronounced /õ/, used in pre 1945 Bulgarian orthography. Interslavic, while not a natural language, features vowels corresponding to both the front and back yers in its Latin etymological alphabet, with the big yer "ъ" occasionally being used in Cyrillic writing, though not officially endorsed.

Many languages that use the Cyrillic alphabet have kept one or more of the yers to serve specific orthographic functions.

The back yer (Ъ, ъ, italics Ъ, ъ) of the Cyrillic script, also spelled jer or er, is known as the hard sign in the modern Russian and Rusyn alphabets and as ер голям (er golyam, "big er") in the Bulgarian alphabet. Pre-reform Russian orthography and texts in Old Russian and in Old Church Slavonic called the letter "back yer" or "yer' " (Russian: еръ). Originally, it denoted an ultra-short or reduced mid rounded vowel.

Its companion, the front yer (Ь, ь, italics Ь, ь), now known as the soft sign in modern Russian, Belarusian and Ukrainian, as "yer" (Russian: ерь, homophonous with еръ) in Pre-reform Russian, and as ер малък (er malak, "small er") in Bulgarian, originally also represented a reduced vowel, more frontal than the ъ. Today, it marks the palatalization of consonants in all of the Slavic languages written in the Cyrillic script except Serbian and Macedonian, which do not use it at all, but it still leaves traces in the forms of the palatalized letters њ and љ. In Bulgarian, it is debated whether the letter palatalises the preceding consonant or is a simple sound /j/. See Bulgarian phonology.

In the modern Mongolian Cyrillic alphabet, ь is also used to represent the palatalization of the previous consonant, while ъ represents a lack of palatalization. However, ъ is only necessary for the purposes of disambiguation between a consonant and an iotated vowel in situations when palatalization should not occur, as by default it would. It is therefore rarely used. As it is not necessary to specify palatalization under those circumstances, the much more common ь is frequently used as a substitute for ъ without any ambiguity arising.

== Original use ==
In Old Church Slavonic, the yer was used to indicate the so-called "reduced vowel": ъ = *[ŭ], ь = *[ĭ] in the conventional transcription. They stemmed from the Proto-Balto-Slavic and Proto-Indo-European short */u/ and */i/ (compare Latin angulus and Old Church Slavonic ѫгълъ, ǫgŭlŭ < Early Proto-Slavic *angulu < Proto-Balto-Slavic *ángulas < Proto-Indo-European *h₂éngulos). In all West Slavic languages, the yer either disappeared or changed to /e/ in strong positions, and in South Slavic languages, the strong yer reflexes differ widely, according to dialect.

== Historical development ==
In Common Slavic, the yers were normal short vowels /u/ and /i/. Havlik's law caused them, in certain positions, to be pronounced very weakly, perhaps as ultrashort vowels, and to lose the ability to take word accent. The weak yers were later dropped, and the strong yers evolved into various sounds that varied across different languages.

To determine whether a yer is strong or weak, one must break the continuous flow of speech into individual words, or prosodic units (phrases with only one stressed syllable, typically including a preposition or other clitic words). The rule for determining weak and strong yers is as follows:

- A terminal yer is weak.
- A yer followed by a non-reduced vowel in the next syllable is weak.
- A yer in the syllable before one with a weak yer is strong.
- A yer in the syllable before one with a strong yer is weak.

In Russian, for example, the yers evolved as follows:

- Strong yers are fully voiced: ь → е (or ë); ъ → о
- Weak yers drop entirely, but the palatalization from a following ь generally remains.

Simply put, in a string of Old Russian syllables, each of which has a reduced vowel, the reduced vowels are, in Modern Russian, alternately given their full voicing or drop: the last yer in the sequence drops. There are some exceptions to the rule, usually considered to be the result of analogy with other words or other inflected forms of the same word, with a different original pattern of reduced vowels. Modern Russian inflection is, therefore, complicated by so-called "transitory" (lit. беглые [ˈbʲeɡɫɨjə] "fugitive" or "fleeting") vowels, which appear and disappear in place of a former yer. For example (OR = Old Russian; R = Russian):

- OR сънъ /ˈsŭ.nŭ/ → R сон [son] "sleep" (nominative singular)
- OR съна /sŭˈna/ → R сна [sna] "sleep's" (genitive singular)
- OR ѫгълъ /ˈɔ̃.ɡŭ.lŭ/ → R угол [ˈu.ɡəɫ] "corner" (nominative singular)
- OR ѫгъла /ɔ̃.ɡŭˈla/ → R угла [ʊˈɡɫa] "corner's" (genitive singular)
- OR дьнь /ˈdɪnɪ/ → /ˈdʲɪnʲɪ/ → R день "day" (nominative singular)
- OR дьни /ˈdɪni/ → /ˈdʲɪnʲi/ "two days" (nominative dual) → R дни [d⁽ʲ⁾nʲi] "days" (nominative plural)
- OR двьрь /ˈdʋɪrɪ/ → /ˈdʋʲɪrʲɪ/ → R дверь [dvʲerʲ] "door" (nominative singular)
- OR двьри /ˈdʋɪri/ → /ˈdʋʲɪrʲi/ → R две́ри [ˈdvʲerʲɪ] "doors" (nominative plural) (note: weak -ь- → ⟨e⟩ to avoid awkward cluster)

== Sources ==
- Schenker, Alexander M. (1993). "Proto-Slavonic". In Comrie, Bernard; Corbett, Greville G (eds.). The Slavonic languages. London, New York: Routledge. pp. 60–121. ISBN 0-415-04755-2.
- Sussex, Roland; Cubberley, Paul (2006). The Slavic languages. Cambridge: Cambridge University Press. ISBN 978-0-521-22315-7.
