= List of things named after Hermann Grassmann =

The following is a list of things named in the memory of the German scholar and polymath Hermann Grassmann:

== Color science ==
- Grassmann's laws

== Mathematics ==
- Grassmann algebra
- Grassmann bundle
- Grassmann dimensions
- Grassmann graph
- Grassmann integral
- Grassmann number
  - Grassmann variables
- Grassmannian
  - Affine Grassmannian
  - Affine Grassmannian (manifold)
  - Lagrangian Grassmannian
- Grassmann–Cayley algebra
- Grassmann–Plücker relations

== Linguistics ==
- Grassmann's law
