= Proto-Indo-European phonology =

Reconstructed sound system of a proto-language

The phonology of the Proto-Indo-European language (PIE) has been reconstructed by linguists, based on the similarities and differences among current and extinct Indo-European languages. Because PIE was not written, linguists must rely on the evidence of its earliest attested descendants, such as Hittite, Sanskrit, Ancient Greek, and Latin, to reconstruct its phonology.

The reconstruction of abstract units of PIE phonological systems (i.e. segments, or phonemes in traditional phonology) is mostly uncontroversial, although areas of dispute remain. Their phonetic interpretation is harder to establish; this pertains especially to the vowels, the so-called laryngeals, the palatal and plain velars and the voiced and voiced aspirated stops.

== Phonemic inventory ==
Proto-Indo-European is reconstructed as having the following phonemes. Note that the phonemes are marked with asterisks to show that they are from a reconstructed language. See the article on Indo-European sound laws for a summary of how these phonemes reflected in the various Indo-European languages.

=== Consonants ===
		Labial	Coronal	Dorsal			Laryngeal
		Labial	Coronal	palatal	velar	lab. vel.	Laryngeal
Nasal		*m	*n				
Stop	voiceless	*p	*t	*ḱ	*k	*kʷ	
Stop	voiced	(*b)	*d	*ǵ	*g	*gʷ	
Stop	aspirated	*bʰ	*dʰ	*ǵʰ	*gʰ	*gʷʰ	
Fricative			*s				*h₁, *h₂, *h₃
Sonorant			*r, *l	*y		*w	

The table uses the Wiktionary's notation for transcribing Proto-Indo-European; variant transcriptions often seen elsewhere are provided for individual segments in the following sections. Superscript *ʰ stands for aspiration, and superscript *ʷ for labialization. The consonant *y is the palatal semivowel (whose IPA transcription is [j] and not [y]).

==== Stop series ====
Proto-Indo-European was formerly reconstructed with four series of stops: voiceless unaspirated, voiceless aspirated, voiced unaspirated, and voiced aspirated (such as *t, *tʰ, *d, *dʰ). More recent reconstructions analyze voiceless aspirated stops as sequences of stop and laryngeal, and so the standard reconstruction now includes only three series of stops, with the traditional phonetic descriptions of voiceless, voiced and voiced aspirated. However, such a tripartite system is not found in any descendant language (Sanskrit has a fourfold distinction, including a voiceless aspirated series), and it is typologically rare across attested languages. The absence or rarity of *b (see below) is also unusual. Additionally, Proto-Indo-European roots have a constraint that forbids roots from mixing voiceless and voiced aspirate stops or from containing two voiced stops. These considerations have led some scholars to propose a glottalic theory of the PIE stop system, replacing the voiced stops with glottalized and the voiced aspirated stops with plain voiced. Direct evidence for glottalization is limited, but there is some indirect evidence, including Winter's law in Balto-Slavic.

==== Labials and coronals ====
PIE *p, *b, *bʰ are grouped with the cover symbol P. The phonemic status of *b is disputed: it seems not to appear as an initial consonant (except in a few dubious roots such as *bel-, noted below), while reconstructed roots with internal *b are usually restricted to Western branches, casting doubt on their validity for PIE.

Some have attempted to explain away the few roots with *b as a result of later phonological developments. Suggested such developments include

- *ml- > *bl-, connecting the dubious root *bel- 'power, strength' (> Sanskrit bálam, Ancient Greek beltíōn) with mel- in Latin melior, and *h₂ebl-/*h₂ebōl 'apple' with a hypothetical earlier form *h₂eml-, which is in unmetathesized form attested in another reconstructible PIE word for apple, *méh₂lom (> Hittite maḫla-, Latin mālum, Ancient Greek mēlon).
- In PIE *ph₃ the *p regularly gives *b; for example, the reduplicated present stem of *peh₃- 'to drink' > *pi-ph₃- > Sanskrit píbati.

At best, PIE *b remains a highly marginal phoneme.

The standard reconstruction identifies three coronal, or dental, stops: *t, *d, *dʰ. They are symbolically grouped with the cover symbol T.

==== Dorsals ====
According to the traditional reconstruction, such as the one laid out in Brugmann's Grundriß der vergleichenden Grammatik der indogermanischen Sprachen more than a century ago, three series of velars are reconstructed for PIE:

- "Palatovelars" (or simply "palatals"), *ḱ, *ǵ, *ǵʰ (also transcribed k', *g', *g'ʰ or *k̑, *g̑, *g̑ʰ or *k̂, *ĝ, *ĝʰ).
- "Plain velars" (or "pure velars"), *k, *g, *gʰ.
- Labiovelars, *kʷ, *gʷ, *gʷʰ (also transcribed *k^{u̯}, *g^{u̯}, *g^{u̯h}). The superscript *ʷ or *^{u̯} stands for labialization (lip rounding) accompanying the velar articulation.

The actual pronunciation of these sounds in PIE is not certain. One current idea is that the "palatovelars" were in fact simple velars, i.e. *[k], *[ɡ], *[ɡʱ], while the "plain velars" were pronounced farther back, perhaps as uvular consonants, i.e. *[q], *[ɢ], *[ɢʱ]. If the labiovelars were just labialized forms of the "plain velars", they would then have been pronounced *[qʷ], *[ɢʷ], *[ɢʷʱ] but the pronunciation of the labiovelars as *[kʷ], *[ɡʷ], *[ɡʷʱ] would still be possible in uvular theory, if the satem languages first shifted the "palatovelars" and then later merged the "plain velars" and "labiovelars". See Centum and satem languages § Different realisations for more support of this theory.

Another theory is that there may have been only two series (plain velar and labiovelar) in PIE, with the palatalized velars arising originally as a conditioned sound change in satem languages. See Centum and satem languages § Only two velar series.

The satem languages merged the labiovelars *kʷ, *gʷ, *gʷʰ with the plain velar series *k, *g, *gʰ, while the palatovelars *ḱ, *ǵ, *ǵʰ became sibilant fricatives or affricates of various types, depending on the individual language. In some phonological conditions, depalatalization occurred, yielding what appears to be a centum reflex in a satem language. For example, in Balto-Slavic and Albanian, palatovelars were depalatalized before resonants unless the latter were followed by a front vowel. The reflexes of the labiovelars are generally indistinguishable from those of the plain velars in satem languages, but there are some words where the lost labialization has left a trace, such as by u-coloring the following vowel.

The centum group of languages, on the other hand, merged the palatovelars *ḱ, *ǵ, *ǵʰ with the plain velar series *k, *g, *gʰ, while the labiovelars *kʷ, *gʷ, *gʷʰ were in general kept distinct. Centum languages show delabialisation of labiovelars when adjacent to *w (or its allophone *u), according to a rule known as the boukólos rule.

==== Fricatives ====
The only certain PIE fricative phoneme *s was a strident sound. As is common for a lone sibilant, it was likely realized as a retracted sibilant. It had a voiced allophone *z that appeared before voiced obstruents, such as an *nisdós ('nest'), and which later became phonemicized in some daughter languages. Some PIE roots have variants with *s appearing initially: such *s is called s-mobile.

The "laryngeals" may have been fricatives, but there is no consensus as to their phonetic realization. They are generally suspected to have been glottal, velar, uvular or even pharyngeal fricatives (much like the Semitic laryngeals that inspired their name), though at least some of these reconstructed phonemes have also been suggested to have been glottal or uvular stops originally.

==== Laryngeals ====
The phonemes *h₁, *h₂, *h₃ (or *ə₁, *ə₂, *ə₃ and */ə/), marked with cover symbol *H (also denoting "unknown laryngeal"), stand for three "laryngeal" phonemes.

The phonetic values of the laryngeal phonemes are disputable; various suggestions for their exact phonetic value have been made, ranging from cautious claims that all that can be said with certainty is that *h₂ represented a fricative pronounced far back in the mouth and that *h₃ exhibited lip-rounding, up to more definite proposals; e.g. Meier-Brügger writes that realizations of *h₁ = [h], *h₂ = [χ] and *h₃ = [ɣ] or [ɣʷ] "are in all probability accurate". Another commonly cited speculation for *h₁ *h₂ *h₃ is [ʔ ʕ ʕʷ] (e.g. Beekes). Simon (2013) has argued that the Hieroglyphic Luwian sign *19 stood for /ʔa/ (distinct from /a/) and represented the reflex of *h₁. It is possible, however, that all three laryngeals ultimately fell together as a glottal stop in some languages. Evidence for this development in Balto-Slavic comes from the eventual development of post-vocalic laryngeals into a register distinction commonly described as "acute" (vs. "circumflex" register on long vocalics not originally closed by a laryngeal) and marked in some fashion on all long syllables, whether stressed or not; furthermore, in some circumstances original acute register is reflected by a "broken tone" (i.e. glottalized vowel) in modern Latvian.

The schwa indogermanicum symbol *ə is sometimes used for a laryngeal between consonants, in a "syllabic" position.

==== Sonorants ====
In a phonological sense, sonorants in Proto-Indo-European were those segments that could appear both in the syllable nucleus (i.e. they could be syllabic) and out of it (i.e. they could be non-syllabic). PIE sonorants consist of liquids, nasals and glides: more specifically, *r, *l, *n, *y (or *i̯) are non-labial sonorants, grouped with the cover symbol R, while labial sonorants *m, *w (or *u̯), are marked with the cover symbol M. All of them had syllabic allophones, transcribed *r̥, *l̥, *m̥, *n̥, *i, *u, which generally were used between consonants, word-initially before a consonant, or word-finally after a consonant. Even though *i and *u were certainly phonetic vowels, they behave phonologically as syllabic sonorants. [ŋ] was an allophone of *n before velar consonants.

==== Reflexes ====
Some of the changes undergone by the PIE consonants in daughter languages are the following:

- Proto-Celtic, Albanian, Proto-Balto-Slavic and Proto-Iranian merged the voiced aspirated series *bʰ, *dʰ, *ǵʰ, *gʰ, *gʷʰ with the plain voiced series *b, *d, *ǵ, *g, *gʷ. (In Proto-Balto-Slavic this postdated Winter's law. Proto-Celtic retains the distinction between *gʷʰ and *gʷ – the former became *gw while the latter became *b.)
- Proto-Germanic underwent Grimm's law and Verner's law, changing voiceless stops into voiceless or voiced fricatives, devoicing unaspirated voiced stops, and fricativizing and deaspirating voiced aspirates.
- Grassmann's law (*Tʰ-Tʰ > *T-Tʰ, e.g. *dʰi-dʰeh₁- > *di-dʰeh₁-) and Bartholomae's law (*TʰT > *TTʰ, e.g. *budʰ-to- > *bud-dʰo-) describe the behaviour of aspirates in particular contexts in some early daughter languages.

Sanskrit, Greek, and Germanic, along with Latin to some extent, are the most important for reconstructing PIE consonants, as all of these languages keep the three series of stops (voiceless, voiced and voiced-aspirated) separate. In Germanic, Verner's law and changes to labiovelars (especially outside of Gothic) obscure some of the original distinctions; but on the other hand, Germanic is not subject to the dissimilations of Grassmann's law, which affects both Greek and Sanskrit. Latin also keeps the three series separate, but mostly obscures the distinctions among voiced-aspirated consonants in initial position (all except *gʰ become /f/) and collapses many distinctions in medial position. Greek is of particular importance for reconstructing labiovelars, as other languages tend to delabialize them in many positions.

Anatolian and Greek are the most important languages for reconstructing the laryngeals. Anatolian directly preserves many laryngeals, while Greek preserves traces of laryngeals in positions (e.g. at the beginning of a word) where they disappear in many other languages, and reflects each laryngeal different from the others (the so-called triple reflex) in most contexts. Balto-Slavic languages are sometimes valuable in reconstructing laryngeals since they are relatively directly represented in the distinction between "acute" and "circumflex" vowels. Old Avestan faithfully preserves numerous relics (e.g. laryngeal hiatus, laryngeal aspiration, laryngeal lengthening) triggered by ablaut alternations in laryngeal-stem nouns, but the paucity of the Old Avestan corpus prevents it from being more useful. Vedic Sanskrit preserves the same relics rather less faithfully, but in greater quantity, making it sometimes useful.

=== Vowels ===
	Front		Central		Back	
	short	long	short	long	short	long
Close	(*i)				(*u)	
Mid	*e	*eː			*o	*oː
Open			*a^{?}	*aː^{?}		

It is disputed how many vowels Proto-Indo-European has, or even what counts as a "vowel" in the language. It is generally agreed that at least four vowel segments existed, which are typically denoted as *e, *o, *ē and *ō. All of them are morphologically conditioned to varying extents. The long vowels are less common than the short vowels, and their morphological conditioning is especially strong, suggesting that at an earlier stage there may not have been a length opposition, and a system with as few as two vowels (or even only one vowel, according to some researchers) may have existed.

The surface vowels *i and *u were extremely common, and syllabic sonorants *r̥, *l̥, *m̥, *n̥ existed, but these sounds are usually analyzed as syllabic allophones of the sonorant consonants *y, *w, *r, *l, *m, *n. The syllabic and non-syllabic versions of these sounds alternate in the inflectional paradigms of words such as *dóru ('tree, wood') (reconstructed with genitive singular *dréws and dative plural *drúmos) or in the derivation of words such as the noun *yugóm ('yoke') with *u, from the same root as the verb *yewg- ('to yoke, harness, join') with *w. Some authors (e.g. Ringe (2006)) have argued that there is substantial evidence for reconstructing a non-alternating phoneme *i in addition to an alternating phoneme *y as well as weaker evidence for a non-alternating phoneme *u.

Furthermore, all the daughter languages have a segment *a, and those with long vowels generally have long /aː/, /iː/, /uː/. Until the mid-20th century, PIE was reconstructed with all of those vowels. Modern versions incorporating the laryngeal theory, however, tend to view these vowels as later developments of sequences involving the PIE laryngeal consonants *h₁, *h₂, *h₃. For example, what used to be reconstructed as PIE *ā is now often reconstructed as *eh₂; *ī, *ū are now reconstructed as *iH *uH (*H representing any laryngeal) and *a has various origins, among which are a "syllabic" [H̥] (any laryngeal not adjacent to a vowel) or an *e next to the "a-coloring" laryngeal *h₂e. (Though they may have phonetically contained the vowel [a] in spoken PIE, it would be an allophone of *e, not an independent phoneme.) Some researchers, however, have argued that an independent phoneme *a must be reconstructed, and it cannot be traced back to any laryngeal.

Any sonorant consonant can comprise the second part of a complex syllable nucleus; all can form diphthongs with any of the vowels *e, *o, *ē, *ō (such as *ow).

It is generally accepted that PIE did not allow vowels word-initially. Vowel-initial words in earlier reconstructions are now usually reconstructed as beginning with one of the three laryngeals, which disappeared before a vowel (after coloring it, if possible) in all daughter languages except Hittite.

==== Lengthened vowels ====
With particular morphological (such as a result of Proto-Indo-European ablaut) and phonological conditions (like in the last syllable of nominative singular of a noun ending on sonorant, in root syllables in the sigmatic aorist, etc.; compare Szemerényi's law, Stang's law) vowels *e and *o would lengthen, yielding respective lengthened-grade variants. The basic lexical forms of words contained therefore only short vowels; forms with long vowels, *ē and *ō, appeared from well-established morphophonological rules.

Lengthening of vowels may have been a phonologically-conditioned change in Early Proto-Indo-European, but at the period just before the end of Proto-Indo-European, which is usually reconstructed, it is no longer possible to predict the appearance of all long vowels phonologically, as the phonologically-justified resulting long vowels have begun to spread analogically to other forms without being phonologically justified. The prosodically-long *e in *ph₂tḗr 'father' results by the application of Szemerényi's law, a synchronic phonological rule that operated within PIE, but prosodically-long *o in *pṓds 'foot' was analogically levelled.

==== /a/ ====
It is possible that Proto-Indo-European had a few morphologically isolated words with the vowel *a: *dap- 'sacrifice' (Latin daps, Ancient Greek dapánē, Old Irish dúas) or appearing as a first part of a diphthong *ay: *laywos 'left' (Latin laevus, Ancient Greek laiós, OCS lěvъ). The phonemic status of *a has been fiercely disputed; Beekes concludes: "There are thus no grounds for PIE phoneme *a"; his former student, Alexander Lubotsky, reaches the same conclusion.

After the discovery of Hittite and the development of the laryngeal theory, almost every instance of previous *a could be reduced to the vowel *e preceded or followed by the laryngeal *h₂ (rendering the previously reconstructed short and long *a, respectively). The following arguments can be set forth against recognizing *a as a phoneme of PIE:

- it does not participate in ablaut alternations (it does not alternate with other vowels, as the "real" PIE vowels *e, *o, *ē, *ō do),
- it makes no appearance in suffixes and endings, it appears in a very confined set of positions (usually after initial *k, which could be the result of that phoneme being a-coloring, particularly likely if it was uvular /q/),
- and words reconstructed with *a usually have reflexes in only a few Indo-European languages. For example, *bʰardʰéh₂ 'beard,' is confined to the western and northern daughter families. That makes it possible to ascribe it to some late PIE dialectalism or of expressive character (like the interjection *way 'alas') and so is not suitable for comparative analysis, or they are argued to have been borrowed from some other language which had phonemic *a (like Proto-Semitic *θawru > PIE *táwros ('aurochs')).

However, others, like Manfred Mayrhofer, argue that *a and *ā phonemes existed independently of *h₂. This phoneme appears to be present in reconstructions such as *albʰós ("white"), *átta ("father"), or *apó ("away") where the absence of a laryngeal is suggested by the respective Hittite descendants; 𒀠𒉺𒀸 (al-pa-aš, "cloud"), 𒀜𒋫𒀸 (at-ta-aš, "father"), 𒀀𒀊𒉺 (a-ap-pa, "behind").

==== Reflexes ====
Ancient Greek reflects the original late PIE vowel system (after the vowel-coloring and lengthening effects of the laryngeals) most faithfully, with few changes to vowels in any syllable, but its loss of certain consonants, especially *s, *w and *y, often triggered a compensatory lengthening or contraction of vowels in hiatus, which can complicate reconstruction.

Sanskrit and Avestan merge *e, *a and *o into a single vowel *a (with a corresponding merger in the long vowels) but reflect PIE length differences (especially from the ablaut) even more faithfully than Greek, and they do not have the same issues with consonant loss as Greek. Furthermore, *o can often be reconstructed by Brugmann's law and *e by its palatalization of a preceding velar (see Proto-Indo-Iranian language).

Germanic languages show a merger of short *a and *o (to Proto-Germanic *a) and long *ā and *ō (to Proto-Germanic *ō) as well as a merger of *e and *i in non-initial syllables, but (especially in the case of Gothic) they are still important for reconstructing PIE vowels.

Evidence from Anatolian and Tocharian can be significant because of their conservatism, but are often difficult to interpret. Tocharian, especially, has complex and far-reaching vowel innovations.

Italic languages and Celtic languages do not unilaterally merge any vowels, but have such far-reaching vowel changes (especially in Celtic and the extreme vowel reduction of early Latin) that they are somewhat less useful. Albanian and Armenian are the least useful, as they are attested relatively late, have borrowed heavily from other Indo-European languages and have complex and poorly understood vowel changes.

In Proto-Balto-Slavic, short *o and *a were merged. A separate reflex of the original *o or *a is, however, argued to have been retained in some environments as a lengthened vowel because of Winter's law. Subsequently, Early Proto-Slavic merged *ō and *ā, which were retained in the Baltic languages. Additionally, accentual differences in some Balto-Slavic languages indicate whether the post-PIE long vowel originated from a genuine PIE lengthened grade or is a result of compensatory lengthening before a laryngeal.

== Accent ==
PIE had a free pitch accent, which could appear on any syllable and whose position often varied among different members of a paradigm (e.g. between singular and plural of a verbal paradigm, or between nominative/accusative and oblique cases of a nominal paradigm). The location of the pitch accent is closely associated with ablaut variations, especially between normal-grade vowels (/e/ and /o/) and zero-grade vowels (i.e. lack of a vowel).

Generally, thematic nouns and verbs (those with a "thematic vowel" between root and ending, usually /e/ or /o/) had a fixed accent, which (depending on the particular noun or verb) could be either on the root or the ending. These words also had no ablaut variations within their paradigms. (However, accent and ablaut were still associated; for example, thematic verbs with root accent tended to have e-grade ablaut in the root, while those ending accent tended to have zero-grade ablaut in the root.) On the other hand, athematic nouns and verbs usually had mobile accent, with varied between strong forms, with root accent and full grade in the root (e.g. the singular active of verbs, and the nominative and accusative of nouns), and weak forms, with ending accent and zero grade in the root (e.g. the plural active and all forms of the middle of verbs, and the oblique cases of nouns). Some nouns and verbs, on the other hand, had a different pattern, with ablaut variation between lengthened and full grade and mostly fixed accent on the root; these are termed Narten stems. Additional patterns exist for both nouns and verbs. For example, some nouns (so-called acrostatic nouns, one of the oldest classes of noun) have fixed accent on the root, with ablaut variation between o-grade and e-grade, while hysterodynamic nouns have zero-grade root with a mobile accent that varies between suffix and ending, with corresponding ablaut variations in the suffix.

The accent is best preserved in Vedic Sanskrit and (in the case of nouns) Ancient Greek. It is also reflected to some extent in the accentual patterns of the Balto-Slavic languages (e.g. Latvian, Lithuanian and Serbo-Croatian). It is indirectly attested in some phenomena in other PIE languages, especially the Verner's law variations in the Germanic languages. In other languages (e.g. the Italic languages and Celtic languages) it was lost without a trace. Other than in Modern Greek, the Balto-Slavic languages and (to some extent) Icelandic, few traces of the PIE accent remain in any modern languages.

== Phonological rules ==
A number of phonological rules can be reconstructed for Proto-Indo-European. It has been argued, however, that some of these rules took place in daughter branches rather than in Proto-Indo-European itself.

=== Szemerényi's law ===
Szemerényi's law deleted word-final s or h₂ when preceded by a sonorant and a vowel, triggering compensatory lengthening of the vowel: -VRs, -VRh₂ > VːR. For example:

- *ph₂tér-s 'father' > *ph₂tḗr > Ancient Greek patḗr, Sanskrit pitā́.

This rule was no longer productive in late PIE, and many potential examples were restored by analogy. For example, the genitive singular of neuter nouns in -men- is reconstructed as -mén-s rather than -mḗn. It was grammaticalised for the nominative singulars of nouns ending in a sonorant, as well as the nominoaccusative of neuter collectives. By analogy, several nouns ending in other consonants also acquired a long vowel in the nominative singular, but retained the -s ending where possible, e.g. *pṓd-s, *dyḗw-s.

=== Stang's law ===
Stang's law affects sequences of final consonants, much like Szemerényi's law, but the result is to delete the second-last consonant rather than the final one. Specifically, w is deleted when between a vowel and a final m, again with compensatory lengthening: Vwm > *Vːm.

- *dyéw-m 'sky' (accusative singular) > *dyḗm > Sanskrit dyā́m, Latin diem.
- *gʷow-m 'cattle' (acc. sg.) > *gʷṓm > Sanskrit gā́m.

Some linguists include an additional rule to delete h₂ before final m: *Vh₂m > *Vːm.

=== Avoidance of geminates ===
PIE generally disallowed two of the same consonant to appear next to each other. Various rules were employed in order to eliminate such sequences.

When two of the same sonorant or *s appeared in sequence and were preceded by a vowel, one of the two was deleted. Additionally, if the sequence was word-final, the preceding vowel received compensatory lengthening.

- *h₁és-si 'thou art' > *h₁ési > Sanskrit asi, Proto-Slavic *esi.
- *ném-mn̥ 'gift' > *némn̥ > Old Irish neim.
- *h₂éws-os-s 'dawn' > *h₂éwsōs > Ancient Greek ēṓs.
- *dóm-m̥ 'house' (acc. sg.) > *dṓm.

In a sequence of dental stops, an epenthetic *s was inserted between them. *h₁ed-ti 'eateth' > *h₁etsti > Hittite ezzi. This rule has been preserved in Hittite where cluster *tst is spelled as z (pronounced as [ts]). The cluster was often simplified to -ss- in the later descendants (Latin and Germanic among others). Sanskrit does not have the rule (Bartholomae's law takes precedence instead), but it does occur in Iranian. *h₁ed-ti 'eateth' > Sanskrit átti; *bʰudʰ-to-s > Sanskrit buddhá, but Avestan busta.

If a sonorant followed a dental sequence, one of the dentals was deleted. The evidence is conflicting on which dental was deleted.

- *sed-tlo- 'seat' > (second dental deleted) *sedlo- > Gothic sitls, Latin sella, Ancient Greek sedlon.
- *méd-tro- 'measure' > (first dental deleted) *métro- > Ancient Greek métron.
- *h₁éd-tro- 'nourishment' > (first dental deleted) *h₁etro- > Sanskrit átra.

=== Siebs' law ===
Siebs' law is related to the feature of s-mobile: whenever it is added to a root that begins with a voiced or aspirated stop, that stop is devoiced. If the stop was aspirated, it might retain its aspiration in some branches. For example: *bʰr̥Hg- > Latin fragor, but *sbʰr̥Hg- > *sp(ʰ)r̥Hg- > Sanskrit sphūrjati

=== Thorn clusters ===
A thorn cluster is any sequence of a dental stop followed by a velar stop. In the IE branches other than Anatolian and Tocharian, thorn clusters undergo metathesis, and in many, the dental also assibilates. For example, for the noun *dʰéǵʰ-ōm, genitive *dʰǵʰ-m-és, Hittite has tēkan, tagnās, dagān and Tocharian A tkaṃ, tkan-, but these forms appear in Sanskrit kṣā́ḥ and Ancient Greek as khthṓn. Sanskrit has assibilation of the cluster *kt to kṣ, while Greek has metathesis alone.

The following cases illustrate some possible outcomes of the metathesis:

- *h₂ŕ̥tḱos 'bear' > Hittite ḫartaggas /ḫartkas/, but Latin ursus, Ancient Greek árktos, Sanskrit ṛ́kṣas.
- dʰgʷʰítis 'decaying, decline, ruin' > Ancient Greek phthísis, Sanskrit kṣítis, perhaps Latin sitis
- Metathetized and unmetathetized forms survive in different ablaut grades of the root *dʰegʷʰ- ('burn' whence also English day) in Sanskrit, dáhati ('is being burnt') < *dʰégʷʰ-e- and kṣā́yat ('burns') < *dʰgʷʰ-éh₁-, and the root *teḱ- ('beget, bring forth') in Ancient Greek, tétoke(n) ('had begotten') < *té-tok- and tíktei ('begets') < *tí-tḱ-e- (perfect vs. present).

Thorn clusters presented a problem in the reconstruction of some cognate sets in which Indo-Iranian sibilants in clusters with dorsals exceptionally correspond to coronal stops in certain other branches (particularly in Greek). 'Bear' and 'decaying' above are examples; another is Sanskrit tákṣan 'artisan' vs. Greek téktōn 'carpenter'. As was the case with the laryngeal theory, these cognate sets were first noted prior to the connection of Anatolian and Tocharian to PIE, and early reconstructions posited a new series of consonants to explain these correspondences. Brugmann 1897's systematic explanation augmented the PIE consonant system with a series of interdentals (nowhere directly attested) appearing only in clusters with dorsals, *kþ *kʰþʰ *gð *gʰðʰ. The use of the letter thorn led to the name "thorn cluster" for these groups.

Once discovered, Anatolian and Tocharian evidence suggested that the original form of the thorn clusters was, in fact, *TK, so that the development outside Anatolian and Tocharian involved a metathesis. The conventional notations *þ *ð *ðʰ for the second elements of these metathesised clusters are still found, and some, including Fortson, continue to hold to the view that interdental fricatives were involved at some stage of PIE. An alternative interpretation (e.g. Vennemann 1989, Schindler 1991 (informally and unpublished)) identifies these segments as alveolar affricates [t͡s d͡z]. In this view, thorn clusters developed as TK > TsK > KTs and then variously in daughter languages; this has the advantage that the first change can be identified with the dental assibilation rule above, which is then broadened in application to affrication of dental stops before any stops. Melchert has interpreted the Cuneiform Luwian īnzagan- 'inhumation', probably [ind͡zɡan], from *h₁en dʰǵʰōm 'in the earth', as preserving the intermediate stage of this process.

=== Laryngeal deletion rules ===
Once the laryngeal theory was developed, and the rules for sound change of laryngeals worked out, it was clear that there were a number of exceptions to the rules, in particular with regard to "syllabic" laryngeals (former "schwa indogermanicum") that occurred in non-initial syllables. It was long suggested that such syllabic laryngeals were simply deleted in certain daughter languages; this is based especially on the PIE word dʰugh₂tér- "daughter", which appears in a number of branches (e.g. Germanic, Balto-Slavic) with no vowel in place of expected /a/ for "syllabic" /h₂/ (cf. English "daughter", Gothic daúhtar). With a better understanding of the role of ablaut, however, and a clearer understanding of which roots did and did not have laryngeals in them, it became apparent that this suggestion cannot be correct. In particular, there are some cases where syllabic laryngeals in medial syllables delete in most or all daughter languages, and other cases where they do not delete even in Germanic and/or Balto-Slavic.

This has led to the more recent idea that PIE had a number of synchronic "laryngeal deletion" rules, where syllabic laryngeals in particular contexts were deleted even in the protolanguage. In the case of *dʰugh̥₂tér-, for example, it appears that PIE had an alternation between a "strong" stem *dʰugh̥₂tér- and a "weak" stem *dʰugtr-, where a deletion rule eliminated the laryngeal in the latter context but not the former one. Forms in daughter languages with the laryngeal (Ancient Greek thugátēr, Sanskrit duhitṛ) or without the laryngeal (Gothic dauhtar, Lithuanian duktė̃) are due to analogical generalization of one or the other protoforms.

This is a new area, and as a result, there is no consensus on the number and nature of the deletion rules. A wide variety of rules have been proposed; Ringe identifies the following three as the most likely candidates (where C=any consonant, V=any vowel, H=any laryngeal, R=any resonant):

1. A laryngeal in the sequence *oRHC was dropped. Example: *tórmos ('borehole') from *terh₁- "bore" (cf. Gk tórmos 'socket', OE þearm 'intestine'). This seems to have operated particularly in the thematic optative suffix *-oy-h₁-, which was reduced to *-oy- in most forms.
2. A laryngeal in the sequence *VCHy was dropped. Examples: *wérye- ('say' present tense) from *werh₁- (cf. Homeric Greek eírei '[he] says', not *eréei); *h₂érye- ('plow' present tense) from *h₂erh₃- ('plow' cf. Lith. ãria '[he] plows', not *ária). See Pinault's law.
3. A laryngeal in the sequence *CH.CC was dropped, where a syllable boundary follows the laryngeal (i.e. the following two consonants are capable of occurring at the start of a word, as in *tr- but not *rt-). An example is the weak stem *dʰugtr- given above, compared to the strong stem *dʰugh̥₂tér-.

It seems unlikely that this is a correct and complete description of the actual phonological rules underlying laryngeal deletion. These rules do not account for all the potential cases of laryngeal deletion (hence the many other rules that have been proposed); for example, the laryngeal in the desiderative suffixes *-h₁s- and *-h₁sy- appears to delete after an obstruent but not a resonant. In any case, it is difficult to determine when a particular laryngeal loss is due to a protolanguage rule versus an instance of later analogy. In addition, as synchronic phonological rules the set of above rules is more complicated than what is expected from a cross-linguistic standpoint, suggesting that some of the rules may have already been "morphologized" (incorporated into the morphology of certain constructions, such as the o-grade noun-forming rule or the rule forming y-presents); the above-mentioned laryngeal deletion in the desiderative suffixes may be an example of such morphologization.

== Phonotactics ==
=== Roots ===
Proto-Indo-European roots mostly have the syllable structure (*s)(C)CVC(C) or (H)(C)CVC(C), where C is any consonant, V is any vowel or syllabic consonant, and H is any laryngeal. Roots which appear to be VC- are actually HVC- (e.g. *h₁es-, "to be") and roots that appear to be CV- are CVH- (e.g. *steh₂-, "to stand"). In some cases, however, presence of a laryngeal before apparent VC- roots cannot be proven, especially for those with initial *h₁-. PIE most likely could not have *r- alone in the onset of a root's syllable (apparent occurrences were *Hr-). Roots which ended in laryngeals are sometimes called disyllabic roots, as descendants in later languages would yield a disyllabic root, such as *ḱerh₂- "to mix", which later became kera in Greek. In PIE itself, though, roots were always monosyllabic. Roots usually followed the sonority hierarchy, thus **ḱret- could possibly be a root, but **ḱetr- could not. There are also restrictions that govern what consonants can occur in a root; a root cannot have two or more voiced consonants (e.g. **gerd- is impossible), and a root cannot have both unvoiced and aspirated consonants (e.g. **gʰet- is impossible), except for when the root starts with *s- (e.g. *steygʰ-, "to march, to ascend").

=== Suffixes ===
Nominal suffixes almost always have the syllable structure -VC- or -CVC-. More complex formations are possible, usually having no (ablauting) vowel (e.g. *-tuh₂t-), but are quite rare. Suffixes with two consonants following the vowel always ended in *-t (e.g. *-ent-, *-went-).

=== Endings ===
Nominal case endings almost always have the forms -(C)(V)C or -(C)V, with most of the exceptions occurring in the plural (e.g. *óHom). Verb endings usually have the form -(C)CV (e.g. *-mi).

== Ablaut ==
The Indo-European ablaut is a system of apophony (i.e. variations in the vowels of related words, or different inflections of the same word) in the Proto-Indo-European language. This was used in numerous morphological processes, usually being secondary to a word's inflectional ending. It is the most common source of apophony in Indo-European languages today.

Proto-Indo-European vowels had 5 different grades, or forms, they could be in:

Zero	Short	Long
∅	e	ē
∅	o	ō

If a syllable had plain *e, it is termed "e-grade" or "full-grade", and if a syllable had *ē, it is termed "lengthened e-grade"; likewise if a syllable had *o, it is termed "o-grade", and if a syllable had *ō, it is termed "lengthened o-grade". When a syllable had no vowel at all, it is termed "zero-grade" (sometimes written "∅-grade"). The vowels *u and *i do not alternate in this way, and thus are often referred to as "non-ablauting" or "not ablauting", sometimes even not being referred to as vowels at all.

== See also ==
- Indo-European sound laws
- Proto-Indo-European accent

== Bibliography ==
- Beekes, Robert S. P. (1995). Comparative Indo-European Linguistics: An Introduction. Amsterdam: John Benjamins. ISBN 90-272-2150-2. (Europe). (U.S.).
- Beekes, Robert S. P. (2011). Comparative Indo-European linguistics : An Introduction. Michiel Arnoud Cor de Vaan. Amsterdam: John Benjamins Pub. Co. ISBN 978-90-272-8500-3. OCLC 767736170.
- Brugmann, Karl (1897). Vergleichende Laut-, Stammbildungs- und Flexionslehre der indogermanischen Sprachen. Vol. 1 (2nd ed.). Strasburg: Trübner.
- Byrd, Andrew Miles (June 2, 2015). The Indo-European Syllable. Brill's Studies in Indo-European Languages & Linguistics. Vol. 15. Leiden, Boston: Brill. doi:10.1163/9789004293021. ISBN 978-90-04-29302-1.
- Kapović, Mate (2008). Uvod u indoeuropsku lingvistiku (in Croatian). Zagreb: Matica hrvatska. ISBN 978-953-150-847-6.
- Matasović, Ranko (2008). Poredbenopovijesna gramatika hrvatskoga jezika (in Croatian). Zagreb: Matica hrvatska. ISBN 978-953-150-840-7.
- Matasović, Ranko (1–2 May 1997). "The Syllabic Structure of Proto-Indo-European - In memory of Jochem Schindler" (PDF). Suvremena Lingvistika. 43–44 No.1-2: 169–184.
- Meier-Brügger, Michael; Matthias Fritz; Manfred Mayrhofer (2003). Indo-European Linguistics. Translation by Charles Gertmenian. Berlin; New York: Walter de Gruyter. ISBN 3-11-017433-2.
- Ringe, Donald A. (2006). From Proto-Indo-European to Proto-Germanic. Oxford University Press. ISBN 978-0-19-928413-9.
- Ringe, Don (February 20, 2009). "Don Ringe ties up some loose ends" (PDF). Language Log.
- Weiss, Michael L. (2009). Outline of the Historical and Comparative Grammar of Latin. Ann Arbor: Beech Stave Press. ISBN 978-0-9747927-5-0.
