= Germanic spirant law =

Sound change law in Germanic language evolution

The Germanic spirant law, or Primärberührung, is a specific historical instance in linguistics of dissimilation that occurred as part of an exception of Grimm's law in Proto-Germanic, the ancestor of Germanic languages.

== General description ==
The law affects the various series of stops in Proto-Indo-European that underwent Grimm's law and Verner's law. If the stops were immediately followed by t or s, they changed to voiceless fricatives (spirants):

- (/bʰt/, /bt/, /pt/ >) /pt/ > /ɸt/
- (/dʰt/, /dt/, /tt/ >) /ts(t)/ > /ss/
- (/ɡʰt/, /ɡt/, /kt/ >) /kt/ > /xt/
- (/bʰs/, /bs/, /ps/ >) /ps/ > /ɸs/
- (/dʰs/, /ds/, /ts/ >) /ts/ > /ss/
- (/ɡʰs/, /ɡs/, /ks/ >) /ks/ > /xs/

=== Effect on labials and velars ===
Under normal conditions, any voiced stop would likely have been devoiced before /t/ and /s/ during Proto-Indo-European times, and so all three Indo-European series of stop consonants (aspirated, voiced and voiceless) had already merged before those two consonants. Therefore, for example, /bʰt/, /bt/ and /ɡʰt/, /ɡt/ had already become /pt/ and /kt/ in some of the late Proto-Indo-European dialects. Likewise, /bʰs/, /bs/ and /ɡʰs/, /ɡs/ had become /ps/ and /ks/. Compare, for example, Latin scrībere 'to write' and legere 'to gather, read' with their past participles scrīptus and lēctus (likely also with a type of compensatory lengthening). Cases before /s/ are also numerous, as can be noticed by comparing Latin scrībere and its perfect scrīpsī, or pingere 'to paint' and pīnxī and also the genitive noun form rēgis and its nominative rēx 'king'.

The specifically-Germanic part of the change in which the first plosive became a fricative but not the /t/ following it seems to have been just an exception to Grimm's law. Under the normal operation of the law, voiceless plosives become fricatives in Germanic. However, if two plosives stood next to each other, the first became a fricative by Grimm's law, if it was not so already, but the second remained a plosive. That exception applied not only to series of two plosives but also to series of /s/ and a plosive, and the plosive was then preserved. In some cases, that gave alternations between two related forms, one with s-mobile and the other without, such as English steer, Icelandic stjór, Dutch stier (← *steuraz ← PIE *steuros with preserved /t/) vs. Limburgish deur, duur, Old Norse þjórr (← *þeuraz ← PIE *tauros with regularly shifted /t/).

Unlike Grimm's law in general, however, the Germanic spirant law continued to operate for some time and to have acted as a surface filter, which eliminated any sequences of a stop followed by t as they arose by borrowing or native word formation. A notable example is the partial loanword *skriftiz (compare Dutch schrift) borrowed from Latin scrīptum 'script'.

=== Effect on dentals ===
The change affecting dental consonants is generally assumed to have been a separate phenomenon, and it already occurred in Proto-Indo-European since other Indo-European languages show similar results. It seems to have occurred only when a dental plosive was followed by a suffix beginning with /t/; geminated /tt/ remained if it occurred within a single morpheme. Evidence from Germanic and other Indo-European languages such as Latin confirms that Latin edere 'to eat' shows the past participle ēsus 'eaten' from earlier *ed-tus. However, a geminate /tt/ is preserved in both Gothic and Latin atta 'father'.

In some instances, /ss/ was partially restored to /st/ by analogy with other words, particularly in verbs. For example, the second-person singular past form of *sitjanan 'to sit' would have become *sód-ta → *sótsta → *sass (compare the related Old English word sess 'seat'). However, it was restored to *sast, based on parallel forms in other verbs such as *stalt (from *stelanan 'to steal') and *halft (from *helpanan 'to help').

=== Loss of /n/ before /x/ ===
A later change that was fed by the spirant law was the disappearance of /n/ before /x/. The preceding vowel received compensatory lengthening and was nasalised:

- /Vnx/ > /Ṽːx/

For example, *bringaną 'to bring', past tense *branhtǭ > *brą̄htǭ (whence English bring, brought; German bringen, brachte; Danish bringe, bragte).

That nasalisation was preserved into the separate history of Old English since it affected the outcome of Anglo-Frisian brightening, which was conditioned by nasality. It is still present in Elfdalian today.

== Reflex in verb paradigms ==
The effect has an important consequence for some of the oldest weak verbs. As the weak past participle was formed with the Proto-Indo-European suffix *-tos, the assimilation could have occurred in all verbs with stems that ended with a stop. For most weak verbs, that was not an issue because they had stems formed with various vowel suffixes. One such suffix was *-(e)ye-, which formed denominatives and causatives. Its form in the past participle retained this suffix as an intervening vowel and so did not cause any special changes to the consonants: PIE *-(e)y-tos > PG *-idaz.

However, some of the class 1 weak verbs had been inherited as j-presents and had the suffix only in the present tense forms but not in the past tense. Some archaic athematic verbs such as 'will', notably the preterite-present verbs, also lacked a vowel suffix. In those verbs, therefore, the participle suffix came into direct contact with the preceding consonant, triggering the spirant law in those verbs. The form of the past participle was also extended to form the weak past tense, which spread the irregular participle form to the entire past.

The following table contains only forms that have survived into the modern languages. Medieval languages had many more. (The forms in brackets no longer show the effect because of levelling or, in the case of German, the High German consonant shift.)

Germanic (Note: Germanic forms from Vladimir Orel, A Handbook of Germanic Etymology.)	English	Frisian	Dutch	German	Icelandic
*bringaną – *branhtē	bring – brought	bring - brocht	brengen – bracht	bringen – brachte	–
*bugjaną – *buhtē	buy – bought	–	–	–	–
*maganą – *mahtē	may – might	meie – mocht	mogen – mocht	mögen – mochte	mega – mátti
*sōkijaną – *sōhtē	seek – sought	sykje – socht	zoeken – zocht	(suchen)	sækja – sótti
*þankijaną – *þanhtē	think – thought	tinke – tocht	denken – dacht	denken – dachte	þykja – þótti
*witaną – *wissē	wit – wist	witte – wist	weten – wist	(wissen)	vita – vissi

Although that looks similar to grammatischer Wechsel, which causes a superficially-similar consonant alternation in strong verbs, it is unrelated. The vowel idiosyncrasies in those verbs are mostly a result of the separate and much-later development of Rückumlaut. Only when an /n/ disappeared with compensatory lengthening of the preceding vowel did the spirant law itself result in vowel alternation. Hence, Middle High German denken 'think' and decken 'cover' had the preterites dāhte and dahte, respectively.

Another result of the spirant law, though far less obvious, was in the second-person singular past tense form of strong verbs, which ended with *-t, without a vowel between it and the verb stem. That caused the final consonant of the stem to undergo the change. The irregular form is preserved directly only in Gothic, however. In Old Norse, the original consonant had been restored by analogy, and the West Germanic languages had replaced the ending altogether by substituting *-ī. However, the form is preserved in the older preterite-presents, even in the older West Germanic languages: compare Gothic magan, Old English magan, Old Norse mega 'may' (infinitive) and þu maht, þū meaht, þú mátt 'thou mayest' (2nd pers. sg.), and -aht- regularly becomes -átt- in Old Norse.

Since the ending was *-ta in late Proto-Indo-European, the suffix should have undergone Grimm's law and become *-þ in Germanic whenever the verb stem did not end in an obstruent. However, it remained as *-t when the stem ended in an obstruct because of the spirant law. However, there is no trace of an ending *-þ in the Germanic languages (except for the rare and isolated Old English form arþ), and *-t is found instead. It is, therefore, believed that since verbs ending in obstruents were so common in Germanic, the form with *-t may have been more common than *-þ. That caused the latter to eventually be regularised out of the system altogether, which left only the former as the sole ending for that form.

== Reflex in verb-noun alternations ==
The effect of the Germanic spirant law can be very neatly observed also by comparing certain verbs with related nouns. A prominent example is the Proto-Indo-European verbal noun suffix *-tis, which survived and remained productive in Germanic, but other suffixes with *-t- were also in use.

Germanic	English	Frisian	Dutch	German
*gebaną – *giftiz	give – gift	jaan – jifte	geven – gift	geben – Gift
*pleganą – *plihtiz	play – plight	pliigje – plicht	plegen – plicht	pflegen – Pflicht
*weganą – *gawihtiz	weigh – weight	wage – gewicht	wegen – gewicht	wiegen – Gewicht
*habjaną – *haftaz	(have)	(hawwe)	hebben – -achtig (and -haftig borrowed from German)	haben – Haft
*kleubaną – *kluftiz	cleave – cleft	kleauwe – kloft	klieven – klucht	klieben – Kluft
*maganą – *mahtiz	may – might	meie – macht	mogen – macht	mögen – Macht

== See also ==
- Glossary of sound laws in the Indo-European languages

== Sources ==
- Ringe, Don (13 July 2017). From Proto-Indo-European to Proto-Germanic. A Linguistic History of English (2nd ed.). Oxford: Oxford University Press. doi:10.1093/OSO/9780198792581.001.0001. ISBN 978-0-19-879258-1. OCLC 972772031. OL 27415350M. Wikidata Q119269648.
