= Adjarian's law =

Vowel fronting in certain Armenian dialects

Adjarian's law is a sound law relating to the historical phonology of the Armenian. In certain dialects, initial-syllable vowels are fronted after the consonants, reflecting the inherited Proto-Indo-European (PIE) voiced aspirates. The law was named after its discoverer, Hrachia Acharian, whose surname was also romanised in a Western Armenian form as Adjarian.

Compare:

- post-PIE *bʰan- "speech" > Classical Armenian բան ban > Karchevan dialect ben, Karabakh dialect pen
- post-PIE **dʰalara- "green" > Classical Armenian դալար dalar > Karabagh telar

as opposed to absence of vowel fronting after the non-aspirated voiced stops:

- PIE * dṓm-; Classical Armenian տուն tun "house" > Karchevan ton, Karabagh ton
- PIE *gʷṓws "cow" > Classical Armenian կով kov > Karabagh kov, kav, Karchevan kav

The conditioning is not a synchronic process but rather reflects the quality of the original prevocalic consonant. In such cases, the vowels first received the advanced tongue root ([+ATR]) feature in certain contexts and the [+ATR] back vowels were then fronted. The dialect of Malatya preserves the intermediate stage, with [+ATR] vowels such as /ɑ̘/.

== Dialect distribution ==
Adjarian's law in its full form appears mainly in dialects of the southern and the eastern parts of the traditional Armenian dialect area, in modern-day southern Armenia and southwestern Turkey. An outlier is the Armenian community of Musaler, on the Mediterranean coast of Turkey.

Adjarian's law and stop phonation in Armenian dialects
Dialect group	Reflexes of Classical Armenian voiceless stops (e.g. /t/)	Reflexes of Classical Armenian voiced stops (e.g. /d/)	Adjarian's law
1	plain voiced: /d/	breathy voiced: /dʱ/	no
2	plain voiceless: /t/	breathy voiced: /dʱ/	no
3	plain voiced: /d/	plain voiced: /d/	no
4	plain voiced: /d/	plain voiceless: /t/	only for /ɦa/
5a	plain voiced: /d/	voiceless aspirated: /tʰ/	no
5b (Malatya)	plain voiced: /d/	voiceless aspirated: /tʰ/	[+ATR], no fronting
6a	plain voiceless: /t/	plain voiced: /d/	no
6b (Aresh; Meghri, Karchevan)	plain voiceless: /t/	plain voiced: /d/	yes
7	plain voiceless: /t/	plain voiceless: /t/	yes

== Historical development ==
Bert Vaux (1992) argues that voiced stops often involve tongue root advancement and proposes that the source of [+ATR] were simply the voiced stops such as /b/, /d/, as found in Classical Armenian. However, Andrew Garrett notes that Adjarian's law is never triggered by voiced stops that have developed from the Classical Armenian plain voiceless stops but that it was also triggered by the breathy-voiced fricative /ɦ/, which developed in the involved dialects from Classical Armenian /j/. He proposes that the voiced stop consonants that trigger the law should be similarly assumed to have been breathy-voiced [bʱ], [dʱ] by the time of the law. Breathy voiced stops are recorded from several other dialects of Armenian, but none of them shows Adjarian's law. Garrett interprets that to mean that Adjarian's law should be considered a type of transphonologization in which breathiness leads to [+ATR] only if it is simultaneously lost. According to Vaux, the relevant feature is instead the devoicing of the voiced stops of Classcical Armenian.

Adjarian's law demonstrates that Proto-Armenian retained the Proto-Indo=European aspirated stops and had not undergone consonant shift like the Germanic languages' Grimm's law. The result is important evidence against certain arguments of the glottalic theory for the Proto-Indo-European stop system since such vowel fronting makes no sense if Proto-Indo-European's voiced aspirates had been simple voiced stops. It does, however, if they were breathy-voiced. Since voiced aspirates then have to be reconstructed for Proto-Armenian, only Proto-Germanic can be claimed to be "archaic" for PIE consonantism in the glottalic theory framework.

The absolute dating of Adjarian's law remains unclear. Dates as early as the 5th century have been proposed. A likely later boundary is the formation of the community of Musaler, no later than the 11th century.

== See also ==
- Glossary of sound laws in the Indo-European languages
