= Glottalic theory =

Proposal in Proto-Indo-European phonology

The glottalic theory is a hypothesis that Proto-Indo-European had ejective or otherwise non-pulmonic stops, *pʼ *tʼ *kʼ, instead of the plain voiced ones, *b *d *ɡ as hypothesized by the usual Proto-Indo-European phonological reconstructions.

A forerunner of the theory was proposed by the Danish linguist Holger Pedersen in 1951, but he did not involve glottalized sounds. While early linguists such as André Martinet and Morris Swadesh had seen the potential of substituting glottalic sounds for the supposed plain voiced stops of Proto-Indo-European, the proposal remained speculative until it was fully fleshed out simultaneously but independently in theories in 1973 by Paul Hopper of the United States and by Tamaz V. Gamkrelidze and Vyacheslav Ivanov of the Soviet Union.

The glottalic theory "enjoyed a not insignificant following for a time, but it has been rejected by most Indo-Europeanists." The most recent publication supporting it is Allan R. Bomhard in a discussion of the controversial Nostratic hypothesis, and its most vocal proponents today are historical linguists at the University of Leiden. An earlier supporter, Theo Vennemann, has abandoned the glottalic theory because of incompatibilities between it and his theory of a Semitic substrate and loanwords in Germanic and Celtic languages. However, Martin Kümmel, although rejecting the ejective hypothesis as implausible, argues for a re-interpretation of these stops as implosive, comparable to the Leiden interpretation as pre-glottalized stops.

== Traditional reconstruction ==
The traditional reconstruction of Proto-Indo-European includes the following stop consonants:

The Proto-Indo-European plosives (traditional)
	labials	dentals	palatalized velars	velars	labialized velars
voiceless stops	*p	*t	*ḱ	*k	*kʷ
voiced stops	(*b)	*d	*ǵ	*ɡ	*ɡʷ
breathy voiced stops	*bʰ	*dʰ	*ǵʰ	*gʰ	*gʷʰ

*b is parenthesized because it is controversial, at best very rare and perhaps nonexistent.

Historically, the inventory was not introduced as an independent proposal, but it arose as a modification of an earlier, typologically more plausible theory.

In the original Proto-Indo-European proposal, there was a fourth phonation series, voiceless aspirated *pʰ, *tʰ, *ḱʰ, *kʰ, *kʷʰ, which was assumed to exist on the basis of what is found in Sanskrit, which was then thought to be the most conservative Indo-European language. However, it was later realized that the series was unnecessary and that it was generally the result of a sequence of a tenuis stop (*p, *t, *k, *ḱ, *kʷ) and one of the Proto-Indo-European laryngeal consonants: *h₁, *h₂, or *h₃. The aspirate series was removed, but the breathy voiced consonants remained.

=== Problems ===
There are several problems with the traditional reconstruction. Firstly, the rarity of *b is odd from a typological point of view. If a single voiced stop is missing from a phoneme inventory (a 'gap'), it would normally be /ɡ/ that is missing (examples including Dutch, Ukrainian, Arabic, Thai, and Vietnamese); on the other hand, if a labial stop is missing, the voiceless /p/ is the most likely candidate (examples including stages in the evolution of Irish, Japanese, and Arabic).

Secondly, there are few languages which have breathy voiced consonants but no voiceless aspirates and even fewer that simultaneously contrast breathy voice with full voice. Roman Jakobson has asserted that no such language is known; however, that is disputed by some linguists who oppose the theory. For example, Robert Blust showed that Kelabit, a language of the Sarawak highlands in Borneo, has a system of stops consisting of voiceless stops, plain voiced stops, and prevoiced stops with voiceless aspiration. This is similar to the traditional reconstruction of the stop series of Proto-Indo-European, which include voiceless, voiced unaspirated, and voiced aspirated stops. In any event, the traditional reconstruction remains a typological oddity.

Thirdly, a longstanding but unexplained observation of Indo-Europeanists about the distribution of stops in word roots is that it had long been noted that certain combinations of consonants were not represented in Proto-Indo-European words in terms of the traditional system:

1. No root contained a sequence of two plain voiced stops: there were no roots of the type *deg, which reflects a common cross-linguistic constraint against roots with two similar stops.
2. No root contained both a voiceless stop and a voiced aspirate: roots of the type *dʰek or *tegʰ were not attested. As the result of a sound shift from Pre-Proto-Indo-European, roots of this type are attested as *dʰegʰ instead.
3. On the other hand, the plain voiced stops were compatible with either of the other two series: *degʰ or *dek were both possible.

The constraints on the phonological structure of the root cannot be explained in terms of a theory of unlimited assimilation or dissimilation since they display a radical difference in patterning between three sets of consonants, the stops, that ought to behave identically. Typologically, that is very odd.

== Original glottalic proposal ==
The glottalic theory proposes different phonetic values for the stop inventory of Proto-Indo-European:

The Proto-Indo-European plosives (original glottalic) (Note: The table reflects the views of Gamkrelidze and Ivanov.)
	labials	dentals	velars (Note: inherently palatalized?)	labialized velars	uvulars
voiceless stops	p ~ pʰ	t ~ tʰ	k ~ kʰ	kʷ ~ kʷʰ	q ~ qʰ
ejective or glottalized stops	(pʼ)	tʼ	kʼ	kʷʼ	qʼ
voiced stops	b ~ bʱ	d ~ dʱ	ɡ ~ ɡʱ	ɡʷ ~ ɡʷʱ	ɢ ~ ɢʱ

In his version of the glottalic theory, Hopper also proposed that the aspiration that had been assumed for the voiced stops *bʰ *dʰ *gʰ could be accounted for by a low-level phonetic feature known to phoneticians as "breathy voice". The proposal made it possible both to establish a system in which there was only one voiced series and to explain at the same time later developments in some Indo-European dialects that became Greek, Latin, and Sanskrit, which pointed to some kind of aspiration in the voiced series. Hopper also treated the traditional palatalized and plain velar dichotomy as a velar-uvular contrast.

Gamkrelidze and Ivanov have posited that both non-ejective series (traditional *p *t *k and *bʰ *dʰ *gʰ) were fundamentally aspirated (*pʰ *tʰ *kʰ and *bʰ *dʰ *gʰ, respectively) but had non-aspirated allophones (*[p] *[t] *[k] and *[b] *[d] *[g]). According to them, the non-aspirated forms occurred in roots with two non-ejectives because no more than one aspirate could be in the same root. To express the variability of aspiration, Gamkrelidze and Ivanov wrote it with a superscripted h: *dʰ. Thus, an Indo-European *DʰeDʰ (in which *Dʰ represents any non-ejective stop) might be realized as *DeDʰ (attested in Indic and Greek) or as *DʰeD (attested in Latin). In contrast, traditional theory would trace a form attested as both *DeDʰ and *DʰeD to an Indo-European *DʰeDʰ. The advantage of the interpretation over the previous is circumventing the typological oddity of the language in having only voiced aspirates by identifying the voiceless non-aspirates of the traditional stop system (*p *t *k) as voiceless aspirates (*pʰ *tʰ *kʰ). Postulating the voiceless stops as aspirated finds support in helping to explain Grimm's Law, with these purported now-aspirated stops (*pʰ *tʰ *kʰ) evolving into Proto-Germanic ɸ θ x. This would also be typologically similar to one of the more notable evolutions from Ancient to Modern Greek (with φ, θ, and χ respectively).

=== Consequences ===
The phonation system proposed by the glottalic theory is common among the world's languages. Moreover, the revised system explains a number of phonological peculiarities in the reconstructed system. The absence of a labial plain voiced stop *b in the protolanguage now becomes an absence of a labial ejective *pʼ, proportionally a rather more common state of affairs. The theory also provides a completely-coherent explanation to the patterning of the stop series in roots:

1. In many languages that have glottalized consonants, there is a phonetic constraint against two such consonants in the same root. The constraint has been found in many languages of Africa, the Americas, and the Caucasus. In Akkadian, the constraint affected borrowed and inherited roots, and one of the two heterorganic emphatics undergoes dissimilation and appears as a simple (unmarked) consonant, which is known as Geers's law.
2. If the "plain voiced stops" were not voiced, the "voiced aspirated stops" were the only voiced stops. The second constraint can accordingly be reformulated as: two nonglottalic stops must agree in voicing.
3. Since the glottalic stops were outside the voiced/voiceless opposition, they were immune from the constraint on voicing agreement in (2).

=== Decem and Taihun ===
In 1981, Hopper proposed to divide all Indo-European languages into Decem and Taihun groups, according to the pronunciation of the numeral '10', by analogy with the Centum-Satem isogloss, which is based on the pronunciation of the numeral '100'. The Armenian, Germanic, Anatolian, and Tocharian subfamilies belong to the Taihun group because the numeral '10' begins with a voiceless t in them. All other Indo-European languages belong to the Decem group because the numeral 10 begins with a voiced d in them. The question then can be framed as which, if either, of the groups reflects the original state of things and which is an innovation.

== Direct and indirect evidence ==
While the glottalic theory was originally motivated by typological argument, several proponents, in particular Frederik Kortlandt, have argued for traces of glottalization being found in a number of attested Indo-European languages or the assumption of glottalization explaining previously known phenomena, which lends the theory empirical support. (Similarly, the laryngeal theory was proposed before direct evidence in Anatolian was discovered.)

Among the Indo-Iranian languages, Sindhi reflects the non-aspirated voiced series unconditionally as implosives. Kortlandt also points out the distribution of voiced aspirates within Indo-Iranian: they are lacking from the Iranian languages and the Nuristani languages, two of the three accepted main branches of Indo-Iranian, and within the third, Indo-Aryan, also lacking from Kashmiri, which he suggests points to voiced aspirates being an innovation rather than a retention.

In Germanic, some Danish dialects have clusters of a glottal stop followed by a voiceless stop (vestjysk stød) which correspond with the Proto-Germanic voiceless stops, deriving from the allegedly-glottalized PIE series. Kortlandt also proposes word-final glottalization in English to be a retention and derives features such as preaspiration in Icelandic and Faroese and sporadically in Norwegian and certain instances of gemination in Swedish and High German from preglottalization as well.

In both Latin (Lachmann's law) and Balto-Slavic (Winter's law), vowels are lengthened before a "voiced" consonant. It is the same behaviour that vowels exhibit before Proto-Indo-European laryngeals, which are assumed to have included a glottal stop. It may be that the glottalic consonants were preglottalized or that they were ejectives that became preglottalized in Italic and Balto-Slavic before losing their glottalization and becoming voiced. It is very common in the world's languages for glottal stops to drop and lengthen preceding vowels. In Quileute, for example, the sequences VCʼV, VʔCʼV, and VːCʼV, as found in ak’a ~ a’k’a ~ āk’a, are allophones in free variation.

In Balto-Slavic, Kortlandt argues that the broken tone (i.e. glottalization) feature of Latvian and Žemaitian is not a later development, but a "direct reflection of PIE laryngeals and the glottalic feature".

Dialects of Armenian also show glottalization. It has been argued to be influence from the other Caucasian languages, but Kortlandt argues glottalization cannot be considered a modern innovation and must be reconstructed with a wider dialectal distribution for older stages of Armenian.

== Objections ==
The primary objection to the theory is the alleged difficulty in explaining how the sound systems of the attested dialects were derived from a parent language in the above form. If the parent language had a typologically unusual system like the traditional *t *d *dʰ, it might be expected to collapse into more typical systems, possibly with different solutions in the various daughter languages, which is what one finds. For example, Indo-Aryan added an unvoiced aspirate series (/tʰ/) and gained an element of symmetry; Greek and Italic devoiced the murmured series to a more common aspirate series (*dʰ to /tʰ/); Iranian, Celtic and Balto-Slavic deaspirated the murmured series to modal voice (*dʰ to /d/) and Germanic and Armenian chain-shifted all three series (*t *d *dʰ > /tʰ~θ t d/). In each case, the attested system represents a change that could be expected from the proposed parent. If the system were typologically common, as proposed by the glottalic theory, it might be expected to be stable and so be preserved in at least some of the daughter languages, which is not the case: no daughter language preserves ejective sounds in places that the theory postulates them.

Its proponents respond that if Proto-Indo-European did not have true ejectives but some less stable kind of glottalic consonant, their loss would be more understandable, but that undercuts many of the original motivations of the glottalic theory, which are based on ejectives (rather than glottalized consonants) and on the idea of a typologically natural (and so stable) system. However, there are some languages in which ejective consonants have voiced allophones, such as Blin and Kw'adza, which has been suggested as an "empirical precedent" for the glottalic theory.

The typological underpinnings of the glottalic theory itself have also been questioned by Martínez and Barrack.

Additionally, if traces of glottalic stops can be found in separate branches such as Italic and Indo-Iranian, the change of *p’ *t’ *k’ to *b *d *g must have occurred independently in each branch after their separation from Proto-Indo-European. Taking them as identical but independent innovations would, according to traditional models of sound change, be an astonishing coincidence, and one which most linguists would find very hard to believe—ejectives tend to be quite stable, diachronically. However, this could be explained if it is assumed that—rather than Proto-Indo-European possessing broad uniformity—a putative shift from ejective to voiced stops was already present as variation at an early stage. Kortlandt also asserts that the change from aspirated to plain voiced stops, which is likewise required as an independent change in numerous Indo-European branches under the traditional model, is not attested elsewhere and is typologically suspect. (However, the same change has been observed to have taken place independently numerous times in the Indic languages.)

A compromise viewpoint would be to see the original formulation of glottalic theory, with ejective stops, as representing an earlier stage in the history of Proto-Indo-European, which would have undergone a period of internal evolution into a stage featuring unstable voiced glottalized stops, or even into the similarly unstable traditional system, before it branched out into the daughter languages. That would explain the root restrictions in Proto-Indo-European, the near-universal loss of glottalic consonants in the daughter languages and the lack of *b in the traditional system, while at the same time explaining evidence supporting the traditional system.

A scenario of glottalic framework in pre-Proto-Indo-European, although possible, is at present unprovable by the methods of historical linguistics because of the uncertainty concerning the possibility of other languages or language families being related to Proto-Indo-European, which might be used as corroborating evidence. (Note: Allan R. Bomhard, for one, has tried to show that Proto-Indo-European was not, in fact, genetically isolated but was related to several other languages/language families of Eurasia, North Africa and the Middle East, the Indian subcontinent, and Northwestern North America.) In practical terms, this is irrelevant for the traditional reconstruction of Proto-Indo-European, which describes only its latest stage (the so-called "Late Proto-Indo-European"). However, Kortlandt suggests that voiced aspirate was probably not in Indo-European before the division into the branches.

In a broad diachronic and synchronic study about sound changes involving ejectives, Fallon argues that the proposed shift from ejective stops to voiced stops—which, according to the ejective model of Proto-Indo-European consonantism, must have occurred in most branches of IE—is not in conflict with empirical data in other language families.

=== Armenian evidence ===
The oldest strata of Iranian loanwords to Armenian demand consonant shifts from voiced to voiceless, which are not possible in a glottalic theory framework in which they were voiceless to begin with. Compare:

- Iran. *ardzata- > Old Armenian arcatʿ "silver" (also related to Latin argentum, from Italo-Celtic, also voiced)

The same argument is valid for early Celtic borrowings into Proto-Germanic, such as Proto-Celtic *rīg- borrowed as Proto-Germanic *rīk-. However, some scholars (like Bomhard) disagree with this, stating that the form that was borrowed was *rīks (with devoicing of [g] to [k] before [s] already in Celtic), and not *rīg-.

Additional evidence from Armenian comes in the form of Adjarian's law: in certain Armenian dialects, initial-syllable vowels are fronted after consonants reflecting the inherited (PIE) voiced aspirates. The conditioning is not a synchronic process but reflects the quality of the original prevocalic consonant. Andrew Garrett argues that such a sound change would be most cogently explained if the triggering consonants were, indeed, voiced aspirates (as they still are in some Armenian dialects) and not plain voiced stops. Since voiced aspirates would then have to be reconstructed for Proto-Armenian, only Germanic could be claimed to be archaic with respect to the traditional voiced aspirate series in the traditional glottalic theory framework.

== Revised proposals ==
One objection that has been raised against the glottalic theory is that the voiced stops are voiceless in some daughter languages: "unvoiced" in Tocharian and Anatolian and aspirates (later fricatives) in Greek and Italic. (Note: voiced consonants "unvoicing" unconditionally is a typologically rare form of fortition) Thus, some more recent versions of the theory have no voiced consonants or treat voicing as non-distinctive. For example, Beekes describes the traditional voiced series as pre-glottalized instead of ejective. That is based on the "voiced" series triggering length in preceding vowels in daughter languages, the glottalic closure before the stop acting in a manner akin to the laryngeals. That analysis results in the following phoneme inventory:

The Proto-Indo-European plosives (pre-glottalic Beekes model)
	labials	dentals	palatovelars	velars	labialized velars
voiceless stops	p	t	kʲ	k	kʷ
preglottalized stops (Note: only after stressed short vowels?)	(ˀp)	ˀt	ˀkʲ	ˀk	ˀkʷ
aspirated stops	pʰ	tʰ	kʲʰ	kʰ	kʷʰ

Martin Kümmel similarly proposes, based on observations from diachronic typology, that the consonants traditionally reconstructed as voiced stops were really implosive consonants, and the consonants traditionally reconstructed as aspirated stops were originally plain voiced stops, agreeing with a proposal by Michael Weiss that typologically compares the development of the stop system of the Tày language (Cao Bằng Province, Vietnam). Kümmel points out that the pre-glottalized lenis stops proposed by Kortlandt and also Beekes can, among other things, be interpreted as voiceless implosive stops; however, Kümmel does reconstruct the stops traditionally reconstructed as voiced as truly voiced.

The Proto-Indo-European plosives (pre-glottalic Kümmel model)
	labials	dentals	palatovelars	velars	labialized velars
voiceless stops	p	t	kʲ	k	kʷ
implosives	(ɓ)	ɗ	ɠʲ	ɠ	ɠʷ
voiced stops	b	d	gʲ	g	gʷ

However, this implosive system is a typological oddity; lacking [ɓ] which is the easiest to pronounce. In other words, Kümmel has circled back to an exoticized version of one of the secondary characteristics of the traditional model the original glottalic theorists had objected to. Nevertheless, proponents of a revised model like Michael Weiss acknowledge the rarity of bilabial implosives, suggesting that they became *w before consonants, citing the strongest reconstructed roots containing *b (from pre-PIE [ɓ]) were pre-vocalic like *bel- "strong" and *bak- "stick" in contrast to the preponderence of PIE *wr-, *wl-. This ɓ > w sound change is attested in Proto-Tai to Longsheng in addition to the similar PT ɓ > v in Yuanyang and Menglian. Alternatively, Weiss suggests that the implosive series could instead be nonexplosives, found in 20% of the world's languages like in Ikwere.

=== Phonation alternative ===
Another alternative to the glottalic theory proposed by James Clackson bases the contrast on phonation. Observing that the traditional voiced aspirated series is preserved in languages like Sanskrit not as true voiced aspirates but as voiced consonants with breathy or murmured voice, Clackson suggests the contrast between voiceless, voiced and voiced aspirates could be reframed as stops conditioned by three phonations: voiceless, creaky or stiff voice, and breathy voice. That, he argues, is typologically more common than voiced aspirates without voiceless counterparts:

The Proto-Indo-European plosives (pre-glottalic Clackson model)
	labials	dentals	palatovelars	velars	labialized velars
voiceless stops	p	t	kʲ	k	kʷ
creaky or stiff voiced (Note: stiff voiced word-initially, creaky elsewhere) stops	(b̬ ~ b̰)	d̬ ~ d̰	ĝʲ ~ g̃ʲ	ĝ ~ g̃	ĝʷ ~ g̃ʷ
breathy voiced stops	bʱ	dʱ	gʲʱ	ɡʱ	ɡʷʱ

Schirru has also suggested that the voiced aspirated stops could be better analyzed as having the feature [+slack vocal folds] or [−stiff vocal folds]:

The Proto-Indo-European plosives (pre-glottalic Schirru model)
	labials	dentals	palatovelars	velars	labialized velars
voiceless stops	p	t	kʲ	k	kʷ
preglottalized stops	(ˀp)	ˀt	ˀkʲ	ˀk	ˀkʷ
slack voiced stops	b̥	d̥	g̊ʲ	g̊	g̊ʷ

== Frederik Kortlandt ==
As mentioned above in "Direct and indirect evidence", Frederik Kortlandt in particular has argued for these traces of glottalization being found in a number of attested Indo-European languages or the assumption of glottalization explaining previously known phenomena, which lends the theory empirical support:

- Direct
  1. Sindhi reflects the non-aspirated voiced series unconditionally as implosives.
  2. In Germanic, some Danish dialects have clusters of a glottal stop followed by a voiceless stop (vestjysk stød) which correspond with the Proto-Germanic voiceless stops, deriving from the allegedly-glottalized PIE series.
  3. In Balto-Slavic, glottalization is also directly attested, in the broken tone of Latvian and Žemaitian.
  4. Potentially word-final glottalization in English
  5. Dialects of Armenian also show glottalization, having inherited it from Classical Armenian.
- Indirect
  1. In both Latin (Lachmann's law) and Balto-Slavic (Winter's law), vowels are lengthened before a "voiced" consonant.
  2. features such as preaspiration in Icelandic and Faroese and sporadically in Norwegian and certain instances of gemination in Swedish and High German

=== Problems ===
Arguably, the minority status of most of the languages which provide the allegedly-certain direct evidence for the theory may be a rather large problem. Also, it is somewhat disputed that either Lachmann's law or Winter's law is real though this dispute is a result of assuming no glottalization in Proto-Indo-European. If Proto-Indo-European once showed glottalization, this circumvents the dispute by not requiring the assumption that we are dealing with an example of a sound law that affects deep phonological structure. Instead, we are dealing with an example of a cross-linguistically common allophonic variation like the VCʼV~VʔCʼV~VːCʼV shown in Quileute. However, it still remains that allegedly-certain direct evidence is absent from any majority Indo-European language except Latvian (Note: Whether Žemaitian is a language or a dialect is disputed.) and two pieces of indirect evidence; the operation of "Lachmann's law" and "Winter's law", have become obscured by subsequent phonological developments in Romance and Balto-Slavic.

=== Classical Armenian ===
Classical Armenian is notable to this discussion because, as mentioned above in "Direct and indirect evidence", it has been argued to be influence from the other Caucasian languages that accounts for dialects of Armenian also showing glottalization, having inherited it from Classical Armenian. But if a part of the Caucasus is accepted as a part of the Proto-Indo-European homeland, this means the Caucasian influence was present before Proto-Armenian diverged from Proto-Indo-European in an eastern dialect which would have been spoken near the Caucasus if not within the Caucasus itself. The evidence from comparison of attested Indo-European and Caucasian languages points to a borrowing of phonemes, but few, if any, obvious roots, from Caucasian languages. The question then becomes what quality these borrowed phonemes had. The most likely candidate is the series of ejective stops that Kartvelian, Northeast Caucasian and Northwest Caucasian share because vowels are already sufficiently accounted for internally and Proto-Indo-European had no cross-linguistically rare pulmonic consonants that it would have had to borrow, the separation of the traditional murmured series being just as likely to be an allophonic variation that became phonemic. There is direct evidence for the traditional murmured series originating as an allophonic variation in the behavior of the voiceless stops in English and German, where they emerge as aspriates except after /s/ and especially to only word-initially. If, following Gamkrelidze and Ivanov and Hopper, aspiration is an allophonic variation of the stops, it makes sense to have the stops traditionially analyzed as plain voiced stops as glottalic, which they do. The series they posit is a series of ejective stops like it would be most geographically logical to assume given the aforementioned overlap between the Proto-Indo-European homeland and the Caucasus. Kortlandt follows this proposal, but also follows more recent versions of the theory in having no voiced consonants or treating voicing as non-distinctive, proposing that the pulmonic stops had phonemic length like vowels had:

The Proto-Indo-European plosives (glottalic Kortlandt model)
	labials	dentals	palatovelars	velars	labialized velars
geminated stops	p:	t:	kʲ:	k:	kʷ:
ejective or glottalized stops	(pʼ)	tʼ	kʲ'	kʼ	kʷʼ
voiceless stops	p	t	kʲ	k	kʷ

It seems paradoxical for Kortlandt to posit that, on the one hand, there are daughter languages of Proto-Indo-European where certain instances of gemination are indirect evidence of former instances of glottalization, and on the other hand, gemination was already phonemic in Proto-Indo-European. The solution to this seeming paradox is that Kortlandt is describing a stage of Proto-Indo-European after an original allophonic variation between glottalic and geminated pulmonic stops became phonemic. The motivation for this idea is that if attested languages commonly show a Vʔ~V: allophonic variation, there is no valid reason to dismiss a C'/Cʔ~C: allophonic variation as impossible. (Note: One of Kortlandt's proposed pieces of indirect evidence implies that this might have happened.) Therefore, if a C'/Cʔ~C: allophonic variation is possible, Kortlandt interprets the traditional voiced series as ejectives and the traditional murmured series is just as likely to be an allophonic variation that became phonemic, Kortlandt is reversing the roles of the geminated and plain stops. Furthermore, if Kortlandt is reversing the roles of the geminated and plain stops, one gets a model fitting with his support of the Indo-Uralic hypothesis, which unites Proto-Indo-European and Proto-Uralic, which only had voiceless stops.

=== Voiced consonants ===
Because Kortlandt reconstructs a Proto-Indo-European without voiced stops, he needs an account of how the voiced stops arose in the daughter languages. For this account, he cites André-Georges Haudricourt's Les mutations consonantiques (occlusives) en indo-européen as a cross-reference for "the typologically normal sequence of developments t > t’ > ’d > d > dʰ > tʰ, (Note: Haudricourt appears to skip over a voiceless preglottalized ('t) stage here.) also t > d > t > tʰ". This is the same as the compromise viewpoint to see the original formulation of glottalic theory, with ejective stops, as representing an earlier stage in the history of Proto-Indo-European, which would have undergone a period of internal evolution into a stage featuring unstable voiced glottalized stops before it branched out into the daughter languages. However, this reveals a hidden problem with Kortlandt suggesting that "voiced aspirate was probably not in Indo-European before the division into the branches" in suggesting that the absence of direct evidence for voiced aspirate losing its aspiration in "all languages except Indic, Greek and Italic" outside of Kümmel's monograph proves that it never happened because voiced aspirate probably never existed in these languages in the first place. Phonological shifts can reverse, especially after they become non-productive, which Icelandic shows much direct evidence of. (Note: The Wikipedia article on Icelandic grammar gives nine precise examples of umlauts which became non-productive and reversed of over the history of Icelandic.) The argument also contradicts Kortlandt's own supposition that the t’ > ’d sound change that occurred "except in Anatolian and Tocharian" reversed in Armenian, not to mention that the voiced "stops" shifted from the traditional voiced aspirates in Proto-Germanic regularly alternated with fricatives. If voiced aspirates ever existed at an ancient stage of any Indo-European languages other than Indic, they could have easily become fricatives either phonemically, as in Italic and ultimately in Greek, or allophonically, as in Germanic. This direct evidence for the ease of occurrence for such a development renders Kortlandt's view that the two voiced series must have, however partially, collapsed back into one, in Albanian and Iranian (Note: Phrygian underwent the same shift as Armenian, but only partially, and all instaces of /p/ in Celtic shifted to /ɸ→x, h/.) something of a paradox. The paradox goes even deeper, many apparent instances of preglottalized stops in Kortlandt's view of late Proto-Indo-European may have been the result of a metathesis 'V/ʔV→V'/Vʔ equally to C'/Cʔ→'C/ʔC. The solution to this paradox is that the Proto-Indo-European glottalic series was never fully stable ejectives, first splitting into ejectives and geminates and then allophonically varying rather freely as ejectives and preglottalized stops.
