= Grassmannian (disambiguation) =

In mathematics, a Grassmannian may refer to:

- Affine Grassmannian
- Affine Grassmannian (manifold)
- Grassmannian, the classical parameter space for linear subspaces of a linear space or projective space
- Lagrangian Grassmannian

== See also ==
- Grassmann algebra, or exterior algebra, a setting where the exterior product is defined.
- Grassmann number, a construction for path integrals of fermionic fields in physics.
- Grassmann integral, a method for integrating functions of Grassmann variables
