= Lachmann's law =

Sound law for Latin vowels

Lachmann's law is a somewhat disputed phonological sound law for Latin named after German Indo-Europeanist Karl Lachmann who first formulated it in 1850. According to it, vowels in Latin lengthen before Proto-Indo-European voiced stops which are followed by another (unvoiced) stop.

== Examples ==
- PIE *h₂eǵtos 'led' > āctus (cf. short vowel in Ancient Greek ἄγω ágō)
- PIE *ph₂gtos 'fortified' > pāctus (cf. short vowel in Sanskrit पज्र pajrás)
- PIE *tegtos 'covered' > tēctus (cf. short vowel in Ancient Greek στέγω stégō)

== Explanations ==
According to Paul Kiparsky, Lachmann's law is an example of a sound law that affects deep phonological structure, not the surface result of phonological rules. In Proto-Indo-European, a voiced stop was already pronounced as voiceless before voiceless stops, as the assimilation by voicedness must have been operational in PIE (*h₂eǵtos → *h₂eḱtos 'forced, made'). Lachmann's law, however, did not act upon the result of the assimilation, but on the deep structure *h₂eǵtos > *agtos > āctus.

Jay Jasanoff defends the Neogrammarian analysis of Lachmann's law as analogy followed by sound change. (*aktos ⇒ *agtos > *āgtos > āctus). Although this formulation ultimately derives from Ferdinand de Saussure, Jasanoff's formulation also explains problems such as:

- *magism̥os > *magsomos > māximus /māksimus/
- *aksī- ⇒ *agsī- > āxī- /āksī-/
- *pōds > *pōs(s) ⇒ *ped-s > *pēts > pēs(s)

Because Lachmann's law also does not operate before PIE voiced aspirate stops, glottalic theory reinterprets the law as reflecting lengthening before glottalized stops, not voiced stops.

== See also ==
- Glossary of sound laws in the Indo-European languages
- Winter's law, a similar law operating in Balto-Slavic
