= Hermann Grassmann =

German polymath, linguist and mathematician (1809–1877)

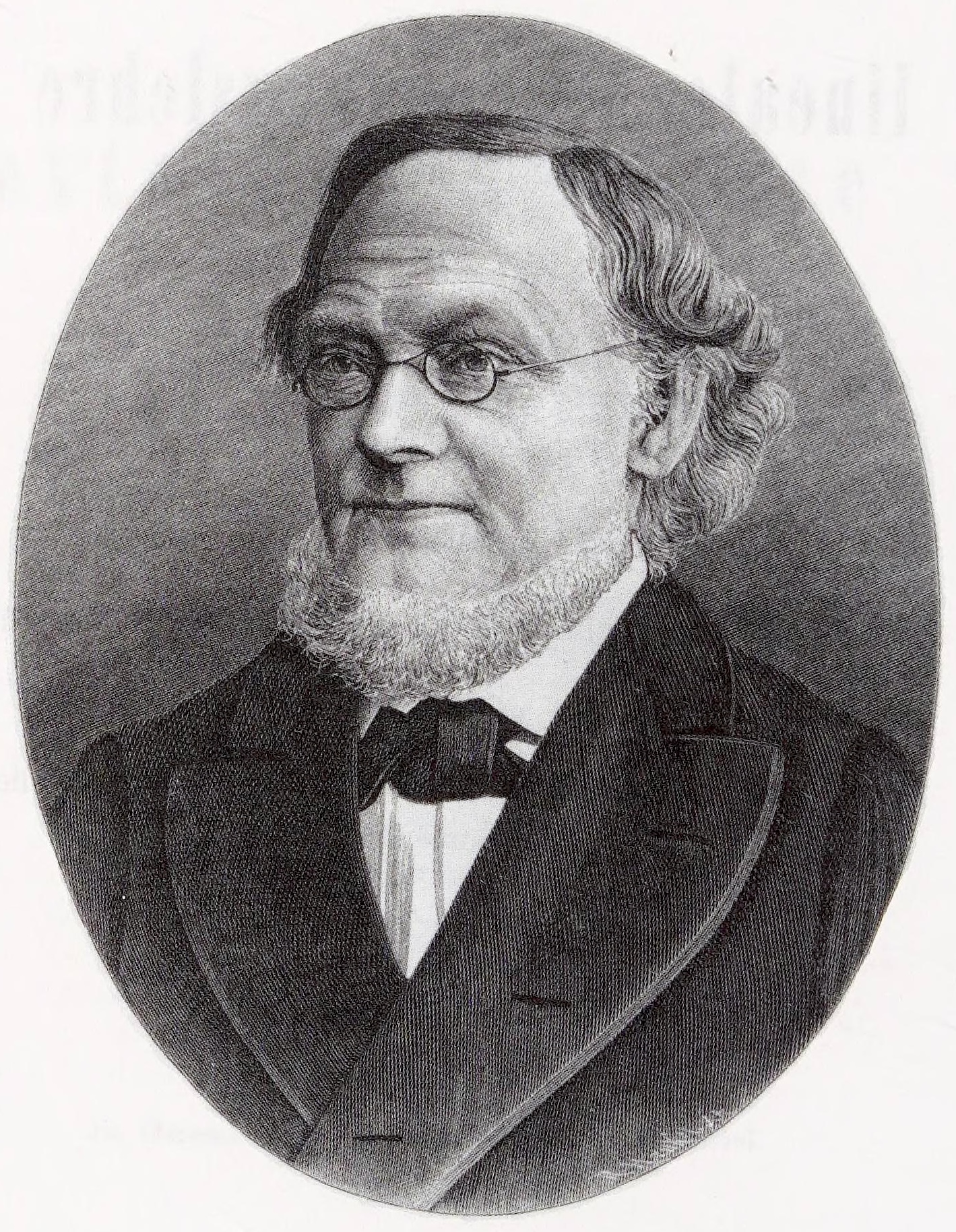
- Born: Hermann Günther Grassmann; 15 April 1809; Stettin, Province of Pomerania, Kingdom of Prussia (present-day Szczecin, Poland)
- Died: 26 September 1877 (aged 68); Stettin, Province of Pomerania, Kingdom of Prussia, German Empire
- Education: University of Berlin
- Known for: Bivector; Color space; Grassmannian; Grassmann algebra; Grassmann number; Grassmann's law; Grassmann's laws
- Awards: PhD (Hon): University of Tübingen (1876)
- Scientific career
- Fields: Linguistics, mathematics
- Workplaces: Stettin Gymnasium
- Academic advisors: Friedrich Schleiermacher
- Notable students: Paul Carus

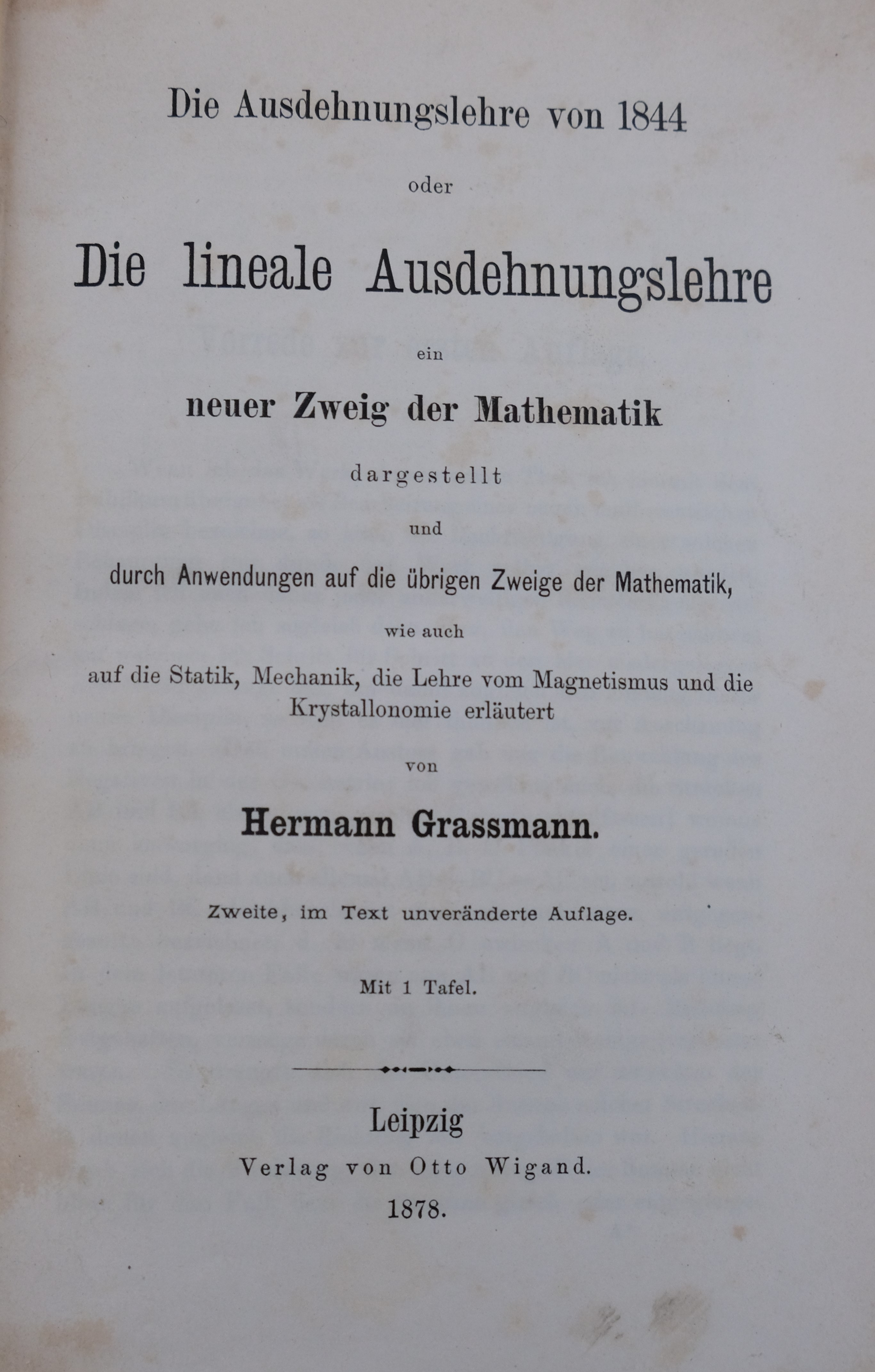
1878 copy of Grassmann's "Die lineale Ausdehnungslehre"

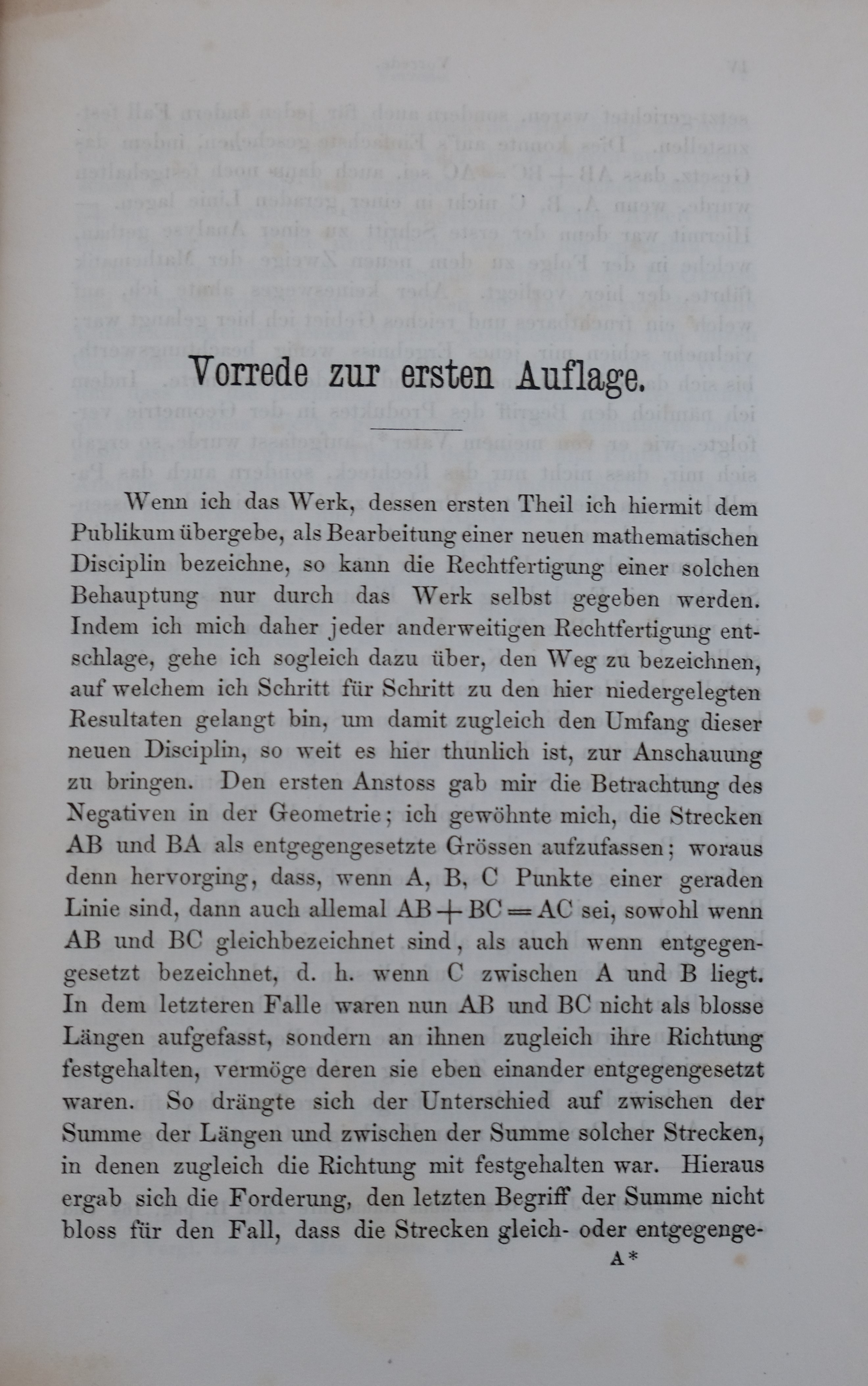
First page of "Die lineale Ausdehnungslehre"

Hermann Günther Grassmann (German: Graßmann, pronounced [ˈhɛʁman ˈɡʏntɐ ˈɡʁasman]; 15 April 1809 – 26 September 1877) was a German polymath known in his day as a linguist and now also as a mathematician. He was also a physicist, general scholar, and publisher. His mathematical work was little noted until he was in his sixties. His work preceded and exceeded the concept which is now known as a vector space. He introduced the Grassmannian, the space which parameterizes all k-dimensional linear subspaces of an n-dimensional vector space V. In linguistics he helped free language history and structure from each other.

== Biography ==
Hermann Grassmann was the third of 12 children of Johanne Luise Friederike Medenwald and Justus Günter Grassmann, an ordained minister who taught mathematics and physics at the Stettin Gymnasium, where Hermann was educated. His brother Robert was also a mathematician.

Grassmann was an undistinguished student until he obtained a high mark on the examinations for admission to Prussian universities. Beginning in 1827, he studied theology at the University of Berlin, also taking classes in classical languages, philosophy, and literature. He does not appear to have taken courses in mathematics or physics.

Although lacking university training in mathematics, it was the field that most interested him when he returned to Stettin in 1830 after completing his studies in Berlin. After a year of preparation, he sat the examinations needed to teach mathematics in a gymnasium, but achieved a result good enough to allow him to teach only at the lower levels. Around this time, he made his first significant mathematical discoveries, ones that led him to the important ideas he set out in his 1844 paper Die lineale Ausdehnungslehre, ein neuer Zweig der Mathematik (The theory of linear extension, a new branch of mathematics), here referred to as A1, later revised in 1862 as Die Ausdehnungslehre: Vollständig und in strenger Form bearbeitet (The Extension Theory: Worked out completely and in rigorous form), here referred to as A2.

In 1834 Grassmann began teaching mathematics at the Gewerbeschule in Berlin, a position previously held by Jakob Steiner. A year later, he returned to Stettin to teach mathematics, physics, German, Latin, and religious studies at a new school, the Otto Schule. Over the next four years, Grassmann passed examinations enabling him to teach mathematics, physics, chemistry, and mineralogy at all secondary school levels.

In 1847, he was made an "Oberlehrer" or head teacher. In 1852, he was appointed to his late father's position at the Stettin Gymnasium, thereby acquiring the title of Professor. In 1847, he asked the Prussian Ministry of Education to be considered for a university position, whereupon that Ministry asked Ernst Kummer for his opinion of Grassmann. Kummer wrote back saying that Grassmann's 1846 prize essay (see below) contained "commendably good material expressed in a deficient form." Kummer's report ended any chance that Grassmann might obtain a university post. This episode proved the norm; time and again, leading figures of Grassmann's day failed to recognize the value of his mathematics.

Starting during the political turmoil in Germany, 1848–49, Hermann and his brother Robert published a Stettin newspaper, Deutsche Wochenschrift für Staat, Kirche und Volksleben, calling for German unification under a constitutional monarchy. (This eventuated in 1871.) After writing a series of articles on constitutional law, Hermann parted ways with the newspaper, finding himself increasingly at disagreement with the newspaper's political direction.

In 1849, he married Therese Knappe and they went on to have eleven children, seven of whom reached adulthood. His son Hermann Ernst Grassmann obtained a doctorate in mathematics and became a professor of mathematics at the University of Giessen.

Following the death of his father in 1852, Grassmann was appointed to the former position of his father at Stettin Gymnasium.

== Mathematician ==
One of the many examinations for which Grassmann sat required that he submit an essay on the theory of the tides. In 1840, he did so, taking the basic theory from Laplace's Traité de mécanique céleste and from Lagrange's Mécanique analytique, but expositing this theory making use of the vector methods he had been mulling over since 1832. This essay, first published in the Collected Works of 1894–1911, contains the first known appearance of what is now called linear algebra and the notion of a vector space. He went on to develop those methods in his Die lineale Ausdehnungslehre, ein neuer Zweig der Mathematik (A1) and its later revision Die Ausdehnungslehre: Vollständig und in strenger Form bearbeitet (A2) (see translations above).

In 1844, Grassmann published his masterpiece (A1) commonly referred to as the Ausdehnungslehre, which translates as "theory of extension" or "theory of extensive magnitudes". Since A1 proposed a new foundation for all of mathematics, the work began with quite general definitions of a philosophical nature. Grassmann then showed that once geometry is put into the algebraic form he advocated, the number three has no privileged role as the number of spatial dimensions; the number of possible dimensions is in fact unbounded.

Fearnley-Sander describes Grassmann's foundation of linear algebra as follows:

The definition of a linear space (vector space) [...] became widely known around 1920, when Hermann Weyl and others published formal definitions. In fact, such a definition had been given thirty years previously by Peano, who was thoroughly acquainted with Grassmann's mathematical work. Grassmann did not put down a formal definition – the language was not available – but there is no doubt that he had the concept.

Beginning with a collection of 'units' e_{1}, e_{2}, e_{3}, ..., he effectively defines the free linear space that they generate; that is to say, he considers formal linear combinations a_{1}e_{1} + a_{2}e_{2} + a_{3}e_{3} + ... where the a_{j} are real numbers, defines addition and multiplication by real numbers [in what is now the usual way] and formally proves the linear space properties for these operations. ... He then develops the theory of linear independence in a way that is astonishingly similar to the presentation one finds in modern linear algebra texts. He defines the notions of subspace, linear independence, span, dimension, join and meet of subspaces, and projections of elements onto subspaces.

[...] few have come closer than Hermann Grassmann to creating, single-handedly, a new subject.

Following an idea of Grassmann's father, A1 also defined the exterior product, also called "combinatorial product" (in German: kombinatorisches Produkt or äußeres Produkt “outer product”), the key operation of an algebra now called exterior algebra. (One should keep in mind that in Grassmann's day, the only axiomatic theory was Euclidean geometry, and the general notion of an abstract algebra had yet to be defined.) In 1878, William Kingdon Clifford joined this exterior algebra to William Rowan Hamilton's quaternions by replacing Grassmann's rule e_{p}e_{p} = 0 by the rule e_{p}e_{p} = 1. (For quaternions, we have the rule i^{2} = j^{2} = k^{2} = −1.) For more details, see Exterior algebra.

A1 was a revolutionary text, too far ahead of its time to be appreciated. When Grassmann submitted it to apply for a professorship in 1847, the ministry asked Ernst Kummer for a report. Kummer assured that there were good ideas in it, but found the exposition deficient and advised against giving Grassmann a university position. Over the next 10-odd years, Grassmann wrote a variety of work applying his theory of extension, including his 1845 Neue Theorie der Elektrodynamik and several papers on algebraic curves and surfaces, in the hope that these applications would lead others to take his theory seriously.

In 1846, Möbius invited Grassmann to enter a competition to solve a problem first proposed by Leibniz: to devise a geometric calculus devoid of coordinates and metric properties (what Leibniz termed analysis situs). Grassmann's Geometrische Analyse geknüpft an die von Leibniz erfundene geometrische Charakteristik (Geometric analysis tied to the geometric characteristic invented by Leibniz), was the winning entry (also the only entry). Möbius, as one of the judges, criticized the way Grassmann introduced abstract notions without giving the reader any intuition as to why those notions were of value.

In 1853, Grassmann published a theory of how colors mix; his theory's four color laws are still taught, as Grassmann's laws. Grassmann's work on this subject was inconsistent with that of Helmholtz. Grassmann also wrote on crystallography, electromagnetism, and mechanics.

In 1861, Grassmann laid the groundwork for Peano's axiomatization of arithmetic in his Lehrbuch der Arithmetik. In 1862, Grassmann published a thoroughly rewritten second edition of A1, hoping to earn belated recognition for his theory of extension, and containing the definitive exposition of his linear algebra. The result, Die Ausdehnungslehre: Vollständig und in strenger Form bearbeitet (A2), fared no better than A1, even though A2's manner of exposition anticipates the textbooks of the 20th century.

== Response ==
In the 1840s, mathematicians were generally unprepared to understand Grassmann's ideas. In the 1860s and 1870s various mathematicians came to ideas similar to that of Grassmann's, but Grassmann himself was not interested in mathematics anymore.

Adhémar Jean Claude Barré de Saint-Venant developed a vector calculus similar to that of Grassmann, which he published in 1845. He then entered into a dispute with Grassmann about which of the two had thought of the ideas first. Grassmann had published his results in 1844, but Saint-Venant claimed that he had first developed these ideas in 1832.

One of the first mathematicians to appreciate Grassmann's ideas during his lifetime was Hermann Hankel, whose 1867 Theorie der complexen Zahlensysteme.

[…], he developed […] some of Hermann Grassmann's algebras and W.R. Hamilton's quaternions. Hankel was the first to recognise the significance of Grassmann's long-neglected writings and was strongly influenced by them.

In 1872 Victor Schlegel published the first part of his System der Raumlehre, which used Grassmann's approach to derive ancient and modern results in plane geometry. Felix Klein wrote a negative review of Schlegel's book citing its incompleteness and lack of perspective on Grassmann. Schlegel followed in 1875 with a second part of his System according to Grassmann, this time developing higher-dimensional geometry. Meanwhile, Klein was advancing his Erlangen program, which also expanded the scope of geometry.

Comprehension of Grassmann awaited the concept of vector spaces, which then could express the multilinear algebra of his extension theory. To establish the priority of Grassmann over Hamilton, Josiah Willard Gibbs urged Grassmann's heirs to have the 1840 essay on tides published. A. N. Whitehead's first monograph, the Universal Algebra (1898), included the first systematic exposition in English of the theory of extension and the exterior algebra. With the rise of differential geometry the exterior algebra was applied to differential forms.

In 1995 Lloyd C. Kannenberg published an English translation of The Ausdehnungslehre and Other works. For an introduction to the role of Grassmann's work in contemporary mathematical physics see The Road to Reality by Roger Penrose.

== Linguist ==
Grassmann's mathematical ideas began to spread only towards the end of his life. Thirty years after the publication of A1 the publisher wrote to Grassmann: "Your book Die Ausdehnungslehre has been out of print for some time. Since your work hardly sold at all, roughly 600 copies were used in 1864 as waste paper and the remaining few odd copies have now been sold out, with the exception of the one copy in our library." Disappointed by the reception of his work in mathematical circles, Grassmann lost his contacts with mathematicians as well as his interest in geometry. In the last years of his life he turned to historical linguistics and the study of Sanskrit. He wrote books on German grammar, collected folk songs, and learned Sanskrit. He wrote a 2,000-page dictionary and a translation of the Rigveda (more than 1,000 pages). In modern studies of the Rigveda, Grassmann's work is often cited. In 1955 a third edition of his dictionary was issued.

Grassmann also noticed and presented a phonological rule that exists in both Sanskrit and Greek. In his honor, this phonological rule is known as Grassmann's law. His discovery was revolutionary for historical linguistics at the time, as it challenged the widespread notion of Sanskrit as an older predecessor to other Indo-European languages. This was a widespread assumption due to Sanskrit's more agglutinative structure, which languages like Latin and Greek were thought to have passed through to reach their more "modern" synthetic structure. However, Grassman's work proved that, in at least one phonological pattern, German was indeed "older" (i.e., less synthetic) than Sanskrit. This meant that genealogical and typological classifications of languages were at last correctly separated in linguistics, allowing significant progress for later linguists.

These philological accomplishments were honored during his lifetime. He was elected to the American Oriental Society and in 1876 he received an honorary doctorate from the University of Tübingen.

== Publications ==
- A1:
  - Grassmann, Hermann (1844). Die Lineale Ausdehnungslehre (in German). Leipzig: Otto Wigand.
  - Grassmann, Hermann (1994). A New Branch of Mathematics. Translated by Kannenberg, Lloyd C. Open Court. pp. 9–297. ISBN 9780812692761.
- Grassmann, Hermann (1847). Geometrische Analyse (in German). Leipzig: Weidmannsche Buchhandlung.
- Grassmann, Hermann (1861). Lehrbuch der Mathematik für höhere Lehranstalten. Vol. 1: Arithmetik. Berlin: Adolph Enslin.
- A2:
  - 1862. Die Ausdehnungslehre. Vollständig und in strenger Form begründet.. Berlin: Enslin.
  - English translation, 2000, by Lloyd Kannenberg, Extension Theory, American Mathematical Society ISBN 0-8126-9275-6, ISBN 0-8126-9276-4
- 1873. Wörterbuch zum Rig-Veda. Leipzig: Brockhaus.
- 1876–1877. Rig-Veda. Leipzig: Brockhaus. Translation in two vols., vol. 1 published 1876, vol. 2 published 1877.
- Grassmann, Hermann (1878). Ueber den Abfall vom Glauben: Mahnungen an die wissenschaftlich Gebildeten der Neuzeit (in German). Otto Brandner.
- 1894–1911. Gesammelte mathematische und physikalische Werke, in 3 vols. Friedrich Engel ed. Leipzig: B.G. Teubner. Reprinted 1972, New York: Johnson.

== See also ==
- Ampère's force law
- Bra–ket notation (Grassmann was its precursor)
- Geometric algebra
- Multilinear algebra
- List of things named after Hermann Grassmann
