= Grassmann's laws (color science) =

Perception of color mixtures

Grassmann's laws describe empirical results about how the perception of mixtures of colored lights (i.e., lights that co-stimulate the same area on the retina) composed of different spectral power distributions can be algebraically related to one another in a color matching context. Discovered by Hermann Grassmann these "laws" are actually principles used to predict color match responses to a good approximation under photopic and mesopic vision. A number of studies have examined how and why they provide poor predictions under specific conditions.

== The original laws ==
Grassmann's original laws were set out in his 1853 paper "Zur Theorie der Farbenmischung". The translations here are from 1854.

1. Every impression of colour of this kind may be analysed into three mathematically determinable elements,--the tint, the intensity of the colour, and the intensity of the intermixed white.
2. If one of two mingling lights be continuously altered (whilst the other remains unchanged), the impression of the mixed light also is continuously changed.
3. Two colours, each of which has a constant tint and a constant intensity of the intermixed white, also give constant mixed colours, no matter of what homogeneous colours they may be composed.
4. The total intensity of the mixture is the sum of the intensities of the lights mixed.

== Modern interpretation ==
Grassmann expressed his first law with respect to a circular arrangement of spectral colors in this 1853 illustration.

The four laws are described in modern texts with varying degrees of algebraic notation and are summarized as follows (the precise numbering and corollary definitions can vary across sources):

First law
Two colored lights appear different if they differ in either dominant wavelength, luminance or purity. Corollary: For every colored light there exists a light with a complementary color such that a mixture of both lights either desaturates the more intense component or gives uncolored (grey/white) light.
Second law
The appearance of a mixture of light made from two components changes if either component changes. Corollary: A mixture of two colored lights that are non-complementary result in a mixture that varies in hue with relative intensities of each light and in saturation according to the distance between the hues of each light.
Third law
There are lights with different spectral power distributions but appear identical. First corollary: such identical appearing lights must have identical effects when added to a mixture of light. Second corollary: such identical appearing lights must have identical effects when subtracted (i.e., filtered) from a mixture of light.
Fourth law
The intensity of a mixture of lights is the sum of the intensities of the components. This is also known as Abney's law.

These laws entail an algebraic representation of colored light. Assuming beam 1 and 2 each have a color, and the observer chooses $(R_1,G_1,B_1)$ as the strengths of the primaries that match beam 1 and $(R_2,G_2,B_2)$ as the strengths of the primaries that match beam 2, then if the two beams were combined, the matching values will be the sums of the components. Precisely, they will be $(R,G,B)$, where
$$\begin{align}
R &= R_1 + R_2, \\
G &= G_1 + G_2, \\
B &= B_1 + B_2.
\end{align}$$

Grassmann's laws can be expressed in general form by stating that for a given color with a spectral power distribution $I(\lambda)$ the RGB coordinates are given by
$$\begin{align}
R &= \int_0^\infty I(\lambda)\,\bar r(\lambda)\,d\lambda, \\
G &= \int_0^\infty I(\lambda)\,\bar g(\lambda)\,d\lambda, \\
B &= \int_0^\infty I(\lambda)\,\bar b(\lambda)\,d\lambda.
\end{align}$$

Observe that these are linear in $I$; the functions $\bar r(\lambda), \bar g(\lambda), \bar b(\lambda)$ are the color-matching functions with respect to the chosen primaries.

== See also ==
- Color space
- CIE 1931 color space
- Trichomacy
- Young–Helmholtz theory
