= S-mobile =

Phenomenon involving Proto-Indo-European roots

In Indo-European studies, s-mobile is a phenomenon where a Proto-Indo-European root appears to begin with an *s-, which is sometimes but not always present. It is therefore represented in the reflex of the root in some attested derivatives but not others. The fact that there is no consistency about which language groups retain the s-mobile in individual cases is good evidence that it is an original Indo-European phenomenon, and not an element added or lost in the later history of any specific language.

== General description ==
This "movable" prefix *s- appears at the beginning of some Indo-European roots, but is absent from other occurrences of the same root. For example, the stem *(s)táwros 'large domestic animal, cattle', perhaps 'aurochs', gives Latin taurus and Old English steor (Modern English steer), both meaning 'bull'. Both variants existed side by side in PIE, with Germanic preserving the forms as *steuraz and *þeuraz respectively, but Italic, Celtic, Slavic and others all having words for 'bull' which reflect the root without the *s. Compare also: Gothic stiur, German Stier, Avestan staora (cattle); but Old Norse stjórr and þjórr; and Greek tauros, Latin taurus, Old Church Slavonic тоуръ (< Proto-Slavic *turъ), Lithuanian tauras, Welsh tarw, Old Irish tarb, Oscan turuf, and Albanian taroç.

In other cases, it is Germanic that preserves only the form without the s-mobile. The Proto-Indo-European root *(s)teg-, 'to cover', has descendants English thatch (from Old English þeccan), German decken 'to cover', Latin tegō 'I cover', but Greek stégō and Russian stog.

Sometimes subsequent developments can treat the forms with and without the s-mobile quite differently. For example, by Grimm's law PIE *p becomes Proto-Germanic *f, but the combination *sp is unaffected by this. Thus the root *(s)prek-, perhaps meaning 'to scatter', has two apparently quite dissimilar derivatives in English: sprinkle (from the nasalized form *sprenk-), and freckle (from *prek-).

S-mobile is always followed by another consonant. Typical combinations are with voiceless stops: *(s)p-, *(s)t-, *(s)k-; with liquids and nasals: *(s)l-, *(s)m-, *(s)n-; and rarely, *(s)w-.

== Origins ==
One theory of the origin of the s-mobile is that it was influenced by a suffix to the preceding word; many inflectional suffixes in PIE are reconstructed as having ended in *s, including the nominative singular and accusative plural of many nouns. The s-mobile can therefore be seen as an interference between the words, a kind of sandhi or rebracketing development. So for example, while an alternation between *péḱyont and *spéḱyont (both meaning 'they saw') might be difficult to imagine, an alternation between *wĺ̥kʷoms péḱyont and *wĺ̥kʷoms spéḱyont ('they saw the wolves') is plausible. The two variants would still be pronounced differently, as the double -ss- is distinct from a single -s- (compare English this pot and this spot), but the alternation can now be understood as a simple process of gemination (doubling) or degemination.

This can be understood in two ways.

- Gemination (*s → *ss): by this view, the form without the *s- is original. A habit of doubling at the join of the words causes a second *-s- which is understood as part of the second word. This is a kind of assimilation. Obviously, this could not happen to related forms which were used in different syntactic positions, and thus the original form without the *s- survives elsewhere. This is the explanation given by Sihler.
- Degemination (*ss → *s): by this view, the form with the *s- is original. When it is adjacent to a noun suffix in *-s, this produces a geminate. In rapid speech this is reduced to a single *-s- which is understood to belong to the noun, leaving the verb without its initial sibilant. This explanation is more popular among linguists, for two reasons: firstly, because a simplification of geminate *ss is also observable elsewhere in the language (e.g. PIE *h₁és-si → *h₁ési: see Indo-European copula); and secondly, because most PIE roots beginning with the clusters *sp-, *st-, etc. have variants without the *s-, whereas there are very many roots beginning with a simple *p-, *t-, etc. which have no s-mobile equivalents. If the variants without the *s- are original, we would be faced with the problem of explaining why the phenomenon was not more widespread.

== Further examples ==
	Root	Meaning	Reflexes with s-	Reflexes without s-
sk	*(s)kand-	to shine, glow	Sanskrit -ścandrá	Sanskrit candrá, Ancient Greek kándaros, Latin candeō, Old Armenian xand
sk	*(s)kap-	tool	Ancient Greek skeparnion	Latin capus
sk	*(s)kel-	crooked	German schielen 'squint', Greek skṓlēx 'worm'	Greek kō̃lon 'limb'
sk	*(s)kep-	cut, scrape	English scab	Late Latin capulare 'cut'
sk	*(s)ker-	cut	English shear, share, Polish skóra 'leather'	Latin curtus 'short', Polish kora 'cortex'
sk	*(s)ker-	bent	English shrink, Avestan skarəna 'round'	Latin curvus 'curved', Russian kriv’ 'crooked', Lithuanian kreĩvas 'crooked'
sk	*(s)kleu-	close (verb)	German schließen	Latin claudere
sk	*(s)kʷal-o-	big fish	Latin squalus	English whale
sl	*(s)leug-	to swallow	German schlucken	Old Irish loingid 'eats', Ancient Greek lúzein 'hiccup', Polish łykać, połknąć 'swallow'
sm	*(s)melo-	small animal	English small	Irish míol 'animal', Russian mályj 'small', Dutch maal 'calf (animal)'
sm	*(s)meld-	melt	English smelt, Dutch smelten	English melt, Ancient Greek méldein
sn	*(s)neh₂-	swim	Vedic Sanskrit snā́ti, Old Irish snáïd	Tocharian B nāskeṃ 'wash themselves'
sn	*(s)nēg-o-	snake	English snake	Sanskrit nāga 'snake'
sp	*(s)peik-	woodpecker, magpie	German Specht 'woodpecker'	Latin pica 'magpie'
sp	*(s)per-	sparrow	English sparrow, Ancient Greek psár 'starling', Polish szpak 'starling'	Latin parra
sp	*(s)plei-	split	English split, splinter	English flint
sp	*(s)poi-	foam	Latin spuma	English foam, Polish piana 'foam'
st	*(s)teh₂-	stand	Latin stare, English stand	Irish tá 'be'
st	*(s)twer-	whirl	English storm	Latin turba 'commotion'
st	*(s)ton-	thunder	Greek stenein	English thunder, Latin tonare
sw	*(s)wagʰ-	resound	English sough	Ancient Greek ēkhḗ 'sound'
sw	*(s)wendʰ-	dwindle, wither	German schwinden 'dwindle'	Russian vjánut′, uvjadát′ 'wither', Polish więdnąć 'wither'

A number of roots beginning in *sl-, *sm-, *sn- look as if they had an s-mobile but the evidence is inconclusive, since several languages (Latin, Greek, Albanian) lost initial s- before sonorants (l, m, n) by regular sound change. Examples include:

	Root	Meaning	Reflexes with s-	Reflexes without s-
sl	*(s)leg-	slack (weak, loose)	English slack, Old Norse slakr	Old Irish lacc, Ancient Greek lagarós
sl	*(s)lei-	slimy	English slime, Irish sleamhuin 'smooth', Lithuanian sliẽnas, Polish ślimak 'snail'	Latin limus 'muck', Ancient Greek leímax 'snail'
sm	*(s)mek-	chin	Hittite zama(n)gur, Irish smig, Old English smǣras 'lips', Lithuanian smãkras, smakrà, Sanskrit śmaśru	Latin māxilla, Albanian mjekër, Armenian mawrukʿ
sn	*(s)neigʷh-	snow	English snow, Latvian snìegs, Russian sneg, Avestan snaēža-, Sanskrit snéha	Latin nix, Ancient Greek nípha, Welsh nyf
sn	*(s)nus-	daughter-in-law	German Schnur, Icelandic snör, Czech snacha, Persian suna, Sanskrit snuṣā́	Latin nurus, Ancient Greek nyós, Armenian nu
