= Grimm's law =

Sound shift in the Germanic languages

A diagram of Grimm's law and Verner's law

Grimm's law, also known as the First Germanic Consonant Shift or First Germanic Sound Shift, is a set of sound laws describing the Proto-Indo-European (PIE) stop consonants as they developed in Proto-Germanic in the first millennium BCE, first discovered by Rasmus Rask but systematically put forward by Jacob Grimm. It establishes a set of regular correspondences between early Germanic stops and fricatives and stop consonants of certain other Indo-European languages.

== History ==
With the formulation of Grimm's law, scholars for the first time recognized sound change as systematic rather than accidental, laying the methodological foundations of historical phonology within historical linguistics. Friedrich von Schlegel first noted the correspondence between Latin p and Germanic f in 1806. In 1818, Rasmus Rask extended the correspondences to other Indo-European languages, such as Sanskrit and Greek, and to the full range of consonants involved. In 1822, Jacob Grimm put forth the rule in his book Deutsche Grammatik and extended it to include standard German. He noticed that many words had consonants different from what his law predicted. These exceptions defied linguists for several decades, until Danish linguist Karl Verner explained them with Verner's law.

== Overview ==
Grimm's law consists of three parts, forming consecutive phases in the sense of a chain shift. The phases are usually constructed as follows:

1. Proto-Indo-European voiceless stops change into Proto-Germanic voiceless fricatives.
2. Proto-Indo-European voiced stops become Proto-Germanic voiceless stops.
3. Proto-Indo-European voiced aspirated stops become Proto-Germanic voiced stops or fricatives (as allophones).

This chain shift (in the order 3, 2, 1) can be abstractly represented as:

- bʰ > b > p > ɸ
- dʰ > d > t > θ
- gʰ > g > k > x
- gʷʰ > gʷ > kʷ > xʷ

Here each sound moves one position to the right to take on its new sound value. Within Proto-Germanic, the sounds denoted by ⟨b⟩, ⟨d⟩, ⟨g⟩ and ⟨gw⟩ were stops in some environments and fricatives in others, so *bʰ > *b indicates *bʰ > *b/β, and likewise for the others. The voiceless fricatives are customarily spelled ⟨f⟩, ⟨þ⟩, ⟨h⟩ and ⟨hw⟩ in the context of Germanic.

The exact details of the shift are unknown, and it may have progressed in a variety of ways before arriving at the final situation. The three stages listed above show the progression of a "pull chain", in which each change leaves a "gap" in the phonological system that "pulls" other phonemes into it to fill the gap. Alternatively, the shift may have occurred as a “push chain”, where the sounds changed in reverse order, with each change "pushing" the next forward to avoid merging the phonemes.

The steps could also have occurred somewhat differently. Another possible sequence of events could have been:

1. Voiceless stops are allophonically aspirated under most conditions.
2. Voiced stops become unaspirated voiceless stops.
3. All aspirated stops become fricatives.

This sequence would lead to the same result. This variety of Grimm's law is often suggested in the context of Proto-Indo-European glottalic theory, which is followed by a minority of linguists. This theoretical framework assumes that PIE "voiced stops" were actually voiceless to begin with, so that the second phase did not actually exist as such, or was not actually devoicing but was losing some other articulatory feature like glottalization or ejectiveness. This alternative sequence also accounts for Verner's law phonetics (see below), which are easier to explain within the glottalic theory framework when Grimm's law is formulated in this manner.

Additionally, aspirated stops are known to have changed to fricatives when transiting between Proto-Indo-European and Proto-Italic, representing a plausible potential change from Proto-Indo-European to Proto-Germanic.

== Further changes ==
Once the sounds described by Grimm's law had changed, only one type of voiced consonant was left, with no distinction between voiced stops and voiced fricatives. They eventually became stops at the start of a word (for the most part), as well as after a nasal consonant, but fricatives elsewhere. Whether they were plosives or fricatives at first is therefore not clear. The voiced aspirated stops may have first become voiced fricatives, before becoming stops under certain conditions. But they may also have become stops at first, then become fricatives in most positions later.

Around the same time as the Grimm's law sounds shifted, another change occurred known as Verner's law. Verner's law caused the voiceless fricatives that resulted from the Grimm's law changes to become voiced under certain conditions, creating apparent exceptions to the rule. For example:

- Proto-Indo-European *bʰréh₂tēr ("brother") > Proto-Germanic *brōþēr (Old English broþor, Old High German bruothar/bruodar)
- Proto-Indo-European *ph₂tḗr ("father") > Proto-Germanic *fadēr (Old English fæder, Old High German fatar)

The early Germanic *gw that had arisen from Proto-Indo-European *gʷʰ (and from *kʷ through Verner's law) further changed with various sorts:

- After *n it was preserved as a labiovelar stop *gw, but later changed to a plain velar *g in West Germanic.
- Following vowels, it seems to have become *w, presumably through a fricative stage *ɣʷ.
- Word-initially, the most plausible reflex is labiovelar stop *gʷ at first, but the further development is unclear. In that position, it became either *w, *g or *b during late Proto-Germanic.
- The regular reflex next to *u would likely have been *g, due to the labial element before a labial vowel being lost in Proto-Indo-European, which continued to act as a surface filter. (See boukólos rule)

Perhaps the usual reflex was *b (as suggested by the connection of bid < *bidjaną and Old Irish guidid), but *w appears in certain cases (possibly through dissimilation when another labial consonant followed?) like warm and wife (provided that the proposed explanations are correct). Proto-Germanic *hw voiced by Verner's law fell together with this sound and developed identically, compare the words for 'she-wolf': from Middle High German wülbe and Old Norse ylgr, one can reconstruct Proto-Germanic nominative singular *wulbī, genitive singular *wulgijōz, from earlier *wulgwī, *wulgwijōz.

== Examples ==
Further changes following Grimm's law, as well as sound changes in other Indo-European languages, can occasionally obscure the law's effects. The most illustrative examples are used here.

Proto-Indo-European	Meaning	Non-Germanic (unshifted) cognates	Change	Proto-Germanic	Germanic (shifted) examples
*pṓds	"foot"	Ancient Greek: πούς, ποδός (poús, podós), Latin: pēs, pedis, Sanskrit: pāda, Russian: под (pod) "under", Lithuanian: pėda, Latvian: pēda, Persian: پا (pa), Serbo-Croatian: pod ("under; floor") and peta as in "heel"	*p > f [ɸ]	*fōts	English: foot, West Frisian: foet, German: Fuß, Gothic: fōtus, Icelandic, Faroese: fótur, Danish: fod, Norwegian, Swedish: fot
*tréyes	"three"	Ancient Greek: τρεῖς (treîs), Latin: trēs, Welsh: tri, Sanskrit: tri, Russian: три (tri), Serbo-Croatian: три̑ (trȋ), Lithuanian: trỹs, Polish: trzy, Albanian: tre	*t > þ [θ]	*þrīz	English: three, Old Frisian: thrē, Old Saxon: thrīe, Gothic: þreis, Icelandic: þrír
*ḱwón- ~ *ḱun-	"dog"	Ancient Greek: κύων (kýōn), Latin: canis, Sanskrit: śván, Welsh: ci (pl. cŵn), Serbo-Croatian: kuče, Persian: سگ (sag), Russian: собака (sobaka)	*k > h [x]	*hundaz	English: hound, Dutch: hond, German: Hund, Gothic: hunds, Icelandic, Faroese: hundur, Danish, Norwegian, Swedish: hund
*kʷód	"what"	Latin: quod, Irish: cad, Sanskrit: kád, Russian: что (čto), Lithuanian: kas, Serbo-Croatian (Torlakian dialect): кvo (kvo), Serbo-Croatian (Kajkavian dialect): кај (kaj)	*kʷ > hw [xʷ]	*hwat	English: what, Gothic: ƕa (hwa), Icelandic: hvað, Faroese: hvat, Danish: hvad, Norwegian: hva
*h₂ébōl	"apple"	Russian: яблоко (jabloko), Lithuanian: obuolỹs, Gaulish abalom, Serbo-Croatian: ја̏бука (jȁbuka)	*b > p [p]	*aplaz	English: apple, West Frisian: apel, Dutch: appel, Icelandic: epli, Swedish: äpple, Crimean Gothic: apel
*déḱm̥t	"ten"	Latin: decem, Greek: δέκα (déka), Irish: deich, Sanskrit: daśan, Russian: десять (desjat'), Welsh: deg, Lithuanian: dešimt, Polish: dziesięć	*d > t [t]	*tehun	English: ten, Dutch: tien, Gothic: taíhun, Icelandic: tíu, Faroese: tíggju, Danish, Norwegian: ti, Swedish: tio
*gel-	"cold"	Latin: gelū, Greek: γελανδρός (gelandrós), Lithuanian: gelmenis, gelumà	*g > k [k]	*kaldaz	English: cold, West Frisian: kâld, Dutch: koud, German: kalt, Icelandic, Faroese: kaldur, Danish: kold, Norwegian: kald, Swedish: kall
*gʷih₃wós	"alive"	Lithuanian: gyvas, Russian: живой (živoj), Sanskrit: jīvá-, Serbo-Croatian: жив (živ), Polish: żywy	*gʷ > kw [kʷ]	*kwi(k)waz	English: quick, West Frisian: kwik, kwyk, Dutch: kwiek, German: keck, Gothic: qius, Icelandic, Faroese: kvikur, Danish: kvik, Swedish: kvick, Norwegian kvikk
*bʰréh₂tēr	"brother"	Sanskrit: bhrātṛ, Ancient Greek: φρατήρ (phrātēr) ("member of a brotherhood"), Latin: frāter, Russian, Serbo-Croatian: брат (brat), Lithuanian: brolis, Polish: brat, Old Church Slavonic: братръ (bratr'), Old Welsh: braut, Latvian: brālis, Persian: برادر (barádar)	*bʰ > b [b ~ β]	*brōþēr	English: brother, West Frisian, Dutch: broeder, German: Bruder, Gothic: broþar, Icelandic, Faroese: bróðir, Danish, Norwegian, Swedish: broder
*médʰu	"honey"	Sanskrit: mádhu, Homeric Greek: μέθυ (methu), Lithuanian: medus, Russian: мёд (mjod), Serbo-Croatian: мед (med), Polish: miód	*dʰ > d [d ~ ð]	*meduz	English: mead, East Frisian: meede, Dutch: mede, German: Met, Danish, Norwegian: mjød, Icelandic: mjöður, Swedish: mjöd
*steygʰ-	"walk, step"	Sanskrit: stighnoti, Ancient Greek: στείχειν (steíkhein), Russian: ступать/ступить (stupat'/stupit') "walk/step"	*gʰ > g [ɡ ~ ɣ]	*stīganą	Old English: stīgan, Dutch: stijgen, German: steigen, Icelandic, Faroese: stíga, Danish, Norwegian: stige, Gothic steigan (all meaning "ascend, climb")
*ǵʰans-	"goose"	Latin: anser < *hanser, Ancient Greek: χήν (chēn), Sanskrit: hamsa ("swan"), Lithuanian: žąsis (older žansis), Russian: гусь (gus'), Persian: غاز (ğaz), Serbo-Croatian: гуска (guska), Polish: gęś	*gʰ > g [ɡ ~ ɣ]	*gans-	English: goose, West Frisian: goes, guos, Dutch: gans, German: Gans, Icelandic: gæs, Faroese: gás, Danish, Norwegian, Swedish: gås
*sengʷʰ-	"sing"	Homeric Greek: ὀμφή (omphē) "voice"	*gʷʰ > gw [ɡʷ] (After n)	*singwaną	English: sing, West Frisian: sjonge, Dutch: zingen, German: singen, Gothic: siggwan, Old Icelandic: syngva, syngja, Icelandic, Faroese: syngja, Swedish: sjunga, Danish: synge

This process appears strikingly regular. Each phase involves one single change which applies equally to the labials (p, b, bʰ, f) and their equivalent dentals (t, d, dʰ, þ), velars (k, g, gʰ, h) and rounded velars (kʷ, gʷ, gʷʰ, hʷ). The first phase left the phoneme repertoire of the language without voiceless stops, the second phase filled this gap, but created a new one, and so on until the chain had run its course.

== Behaviour in consonant clusters ==
When two obstruents occurred in a pair, the first was changed according to Grimm's law, if possible, while the second was not. If either of the two was voiceless, the whole cluster was devoiced, and the first obstruent also lost its labialisation, if it was present.

Most examples of this occurred with obstruents preceded by *s (resulting in *sp, *st, *sk, *skʷ), or obstruents followed by *t (giving *ft, *ss, *ht, *ht) or *s (giving *fs, *ss, *hs, *hs). The latter change was frequent in suffixes, and became a phonotactic restriction known as the Germanic spirant law. This rule remained productive throughout the Proto-Germanic period. The cluster *tt became *ss (as in many Indo-European daughter languages), but this was often restored analogically to *st later on.

Examples with preceding *s:

Non-Germanic examples	Change	Germanic examples
Latin: spuere, Lithuanian: spjáuti	*sp	English: spew, West Frisian: spije, Dutch: spuwen, German: speien, Danish, Norwegian, Swedish: spy, Icelandic: spýja, Faroese: spýggja, Gothic: speiwan
Latin: stāre, Irish: stad, Sanskrit: sta, Russian: стать (stat'), Lithuanian: stoti, Persian: ايستادن (istâdan)	*st	English: stand, Icelandic, Faroese, Norwegian: standa, Gothic: standan; West Frisian: stean, Dutch: staan, German: stehen, Danish, Swedish: stå
Lithuanian: skurdus	*sk	English: short, Old High German: scurz, Icelandic: skorta
Irish: scéal	*skʷ	English: scold, Icelandic: skáld, Norwegian: skald; West Frisian: skelle, Dutch: schelden, German: schelten

- Some linguists dispute the origin of the word "scold", but Julius Pokorny, among others, proposed *skʷetlo as the assumed root.
- Several languages, including English, later have an unrelated change /sk/ > /ʃ/ (or > /sx/ in the case of Dutch).

Examples with following *t:

Non-Germanic examples	Change	Germanic examples
Ancient Greek: κλέπτης (kleptēs), Old Prussian: au-klipts "hidden"	*pt→ft	Gothic: hliftus "thief"
Latin: atta, Greek: ἄττα (átta)	*tt→tt	Old High German: atto, Gothic: atta "father"
Ancient Greek: ὀκτώ (oktō), Irish: ocht, Latin: octō	*kt→ht	English: eight, West Frisian, Dutch, German: acht, Gothic: ahtáu, Icelandic: átta
Irish: anocht, Latin: nox, noct-, Greek: νύξ, νυκτ- (núks, nukt-), Sanskrit: नक्तम् (naktam), Lithuanian: naktis, Hittite (genitive): nekuz (pronounced /nekʷts/)	*kʷt→ht	English: night, West Frisian, Dutch: nacht, German: Nacht, Gothic: nahts, Icelandic: nótt

- Icelandic nótt [nouht] comes from Old Norse nǫ́tt, nátt, from Proto-Germanic *naht-. The Germanic *ht regularly becomes Old Norse tt, and this then becomes preaspirated in Icelandic. Thus, the [h] of the modern Icelandic form is not Germanic /h/'s direct descendant. The same ancestry holds for Icelandic átta's /tt/ as well.

== Correspondences to PIE ==
The Germanic "sound laws", combined with regular changes reconstructed for other Indo-European languages, allow one to define the expected sound correspondences between different branches of the family. For example, Germanic (word-initial) *b- corresponds regularly to Latin *f-, Greek pʰ-, Sanskrit bʰ-, Slavic, Baltic or Celtic b-, etc., while Germanic *f- corresponds to Latin, Greek, Sanskrit, Slavic and Baltic p- and to zero (no initial consonant) in Celtic. The former set goes back to PIE *bʰ- (faithfully reflected in Sanskrit and modified in various ways elsewhere), and the latter set to PIE *p- (shifted in Germanic, lost in Celtic, but preserved in the other groups mentioned here).

One of the more conspicuous present surface correspondences is the English digraph wh and the corresponding Latin and Romance digraph qu, notably found in interrogative words (wh-words) such as the five Ws. These both come from *kʷ. The present pronunciations have further changed, like many English varieties reducing the wh-cluster, though the spellings reflect the history more; see English interrogative words: Etymology for details.

== See also ==
- Glossary of sound laws in the Indo-European languages
- High German consonant shift
- Glottalic theory
- The Tuscan gorgia, a similar evolution differentiating the Tuscan dialects from Standard Italian.
- The Uralic Hungarian language was also affected by a similar process, leading to a high frequency of f and h, and can be compared to Finnish, which did not change this way.
- Armenian, another Indo-European language, has experienced a similar evolution.
- A rare Austronesian language following something similar is Chamorro.
- Stigler's law of eponymy
- Grassmann's law
