= Winter's law =

Proposed sound change in Balto-Slavic languages

Winter's law, named after Werner Winter, who postulated it in 1978, is a proposed sound law operating on Balto-Slavic short vowels */e/, */o/, */a/ (< Proto-Indo-European (PIE) *h₂e), */i/ and */u/ according to which they lengthen before unaspirated voiced stops, and that syllable gains a rising, acute accent.

Compare:

- PIE *sed- "to sit" (> Latin sedeō, Sanskrit sīdati, Ancient Greek hézomai and English sit) > Proto-Balto-Slavic (PBS) *sēˀstei (*sēˀd-tei) > Lithuanian sė́sti, Old Church Slavonic (OCS) sěsti (with regular *dt > *st dissimilation; OCS and Common Slavic yat /ě/ < PIE/PBS */ē/).
- PIE *h₂ébōl "apple" (> English apple) > Proto-Balto-Slavic *āˀbōl > standard Lithuanian obuolỹs (accusative óbuolį) and also dialectal forms of óbuolas and Samogitian óbulas, OCS ablъko, modern Serbo-Croatian jȁbuka, Slovene jábolko etc.

Winter's law distinguishes the Balto-Slavic reflexes of PIE */b/, */d/, */g/, */gʷ/ (before which Winter's law operates in closed syllables) and PIE */bʰ/, */dʰ/, */gʰ/, */gʷʰ/ (before which there is no effect of Winter's law). Therefore in relative chronology, Winter's law operated before PIE aspirated stops */bʰ/, */dʰ/, */gʰ/ merged with PIE plain voiced stops */b/, */d/, */g/ in Balto-Slavic.

Secondarily, it distinguishes the reflexes of PIE *h₂e > */a/ and PIE */o/ which otherwise merged to */a/ in Balto-Slavic. Winter's law lengthened old */a/ (< PIE *h₂e) into Balto-Slavic */ā/ (> Lithuanian /o/, Latvian /ā/, OCS /a/) and old */o/ into Balto-Slavic */ō/ (> Lithuanian and Latvian uo, but OCS /a/). A later Common Slavic innovation merged the reflexes of Balto-Slavic */ā/ and */ō/ into OCS /a/, so Winter's law operated before the common Balto-Slavic change */o/ > */a/.

The original formulation claimed vowels regularly lengthened in front of PIE voiced stops in all environments. While numerous examples supported this, many counterexamples existed such as OCS stogъ "stack" < PBS *stagas < PIE *stógos, OCS voda "water" < PBS *wadō < PIE *wodṓr (collective noun formed from PIE *wódr̥). Matasović adjusted Winter's law in 1994 to operate only on closed syllables, which was used in the Lexikon der indogermanischen Verben. Kortlandt, Shintani, Rasmussen, Dybo and Holst vary the blocking mechanism differently.

== Criticism ==
Not all Balto-Slavic historical linguists accept Winter's law. Patri (2006) found that exceptions to the law create a too heterogeneous and voluminous set of data to allow any phonological generalization into a law.

== See also ==
- Glossary of sound laws in the Indo-European languages
- Lachmann's law, a similar law in Latin
