= Affine Grassmannian (manifold) =

Mathematical concept

In mathematics, there are two distinct meanings of the term affine Grassmannian. In one it is the manifold of all k-dimensional affine subspaces of R^{n} (described on this page), while in the other the affine Grassmannian is a quotient of a group-ring based on formal Laurent series.

== Formal definition ==
Given a finite-dimensional vector space V and a non-negative integer k, then Graff_{k}(V) is the topological space of all affine k-dimensional subspaces of V.

It has a natural projection p:Graff_{k}(V) → Gr_{k}(V), the Grassmannian of all linear k-dimensional subspaces of V by defining p(U) to be the translation of U to a subspace through the origin. This projection is a fibration, and if V is given an inner product, the fibre containing U can be identified with $p(U)^\perp$, the orthogonal complement to p(U). The fibres are therefore vector spaces, and the projection p is a vector bundle over the Grassmannian, which defines the manifold structure on Graff_{k}(V).

As a homogeneous space, the affine Grassmannian of an n-dimensional vector space V can be identified with

$$\mathrm{Graff}_k(V) \simeq \frac{E(n)}{E(k)\times O(n-k)}$$

where E(n) is the Euclidean group of R^{n} and O(m) is the orthogonal group on R^{m}. It follows that the dimension is given by

$$\dim\left[ \mathrm{Graff}_k(V) \right] = (n-k)(k+1) \, .$$

(This relation is easier to deduce from the identification of next section, as the difference between the number of coefficients, (n−k)(n+1) and the dimension of the linear group acting on the equations, (n−k)^{2}.)

== Relationship with ordinary Grassmannian ==
Let (x_{1},...,x_{n}) be the usual linear coordinates on R^{n}. Then R^{n} is embedded into R^{n+1} as the affine hyperplane x_{n+1} = 1. The k-dimensional affine subspaces of R^{n} are in one-to-one correspondence with the (k+1)-dimensional linear subspaces of R^{n+1} that are in general position with respect to the plane x_{n+1} = 1. Indeed, a k-dimensional affine subspace of R^{n} is the locus of solutions of a rank n − k system of affine equations

$$\begin{align}
a_{11}x_1 + \cdots + a_{1n}x_n &= a_{1,n+1}\\
&\vdots&\\
a_{n-k,1}x_1 + \cdots + a_{n-k,n}x_n &= a_{n-k,n+1}.
\end{align}$$

These determine a rank n−k system of linear equations on R^{n+1}

$$\begin{align}
a_{11}x_1 + \cdots + a_{1n}x_n &= a_{1,n+1}x_{n+1}\\
&\vdots&\\
a_{n-k,1}x_1 + \cdots + a_{n-k,n}x_n &= a_{n-k,n+1}x_{n+1}.
\end{align}$$

whose solution is a (k + 1)-plane that, when intersected with x_{n+1} = 1, is the original k-plane.

Because of this identification, Graff(k,n) is a Zariski open set in Gr(k + 1, n + 1).
