= Klingenheben's law =

Hausa-language sound law

In historical linguistics, Klingenheben's law is a set of four sound changes governing the lenition (softening) of certain syllable-final consonants in earlier forms of the Hausa language. The four sound changes affect the velar stops, coronal stops, labial obstruents, and the bilabial nasal. Only the first two are universal to all dialects of the language. The affected consonants were lenited in syllable-final position when followed by a syllable-initial consonant. When other morphophonological changes affected the position of that consonant within a syllable, namely shifting it from the end of one syllable to the beginning of the following syllable, the law no longer applied, leading to phonological alternation.

Klingenheben's law has been employed as an example of geminate inalterability, a process which explains the exceptional behavior of geminate consonants in certain contexts. It is considered one of the two most important sound laws governing Hausa's consonantal inventory and syllable structure, the other being the law of codas in reduplication; these two phenomena were once considered part of the same process. The law is named for the German Africanist August Klingenheben who first described the process in the late 1920s.

== Background ==
A spoken sample of modern Hausa

Hausa is a Chadic language spoken by about 20 million people in the Sahel in Central and West Africa, with most speakers living in northern Nigeria. A part of the larger Afroasiatic language family, it is distantly related to languages like Arabic, Hebrew, Amharic, and Somali. At the time of the law's first description, it was unclear that Hausa numbered among the Chadic languages.

In an article for the 1927/1928 issue of the Zeitschrift für Eingeborenen-Sprachen ('Journal for Indigenous Languages'), the German Africanist August Klingenheben described processes he had discovered, which he termed collectively as Silbenauslautgesetze ('syllable-final [sound] laws'). Klingenheben proposed this sound law after analyzing the irregularity of the language's surface representation. By positing the historical sound changes contained within the law, Klingenheben could make sense of the contrasting forms.

Along with the law of codas in reduplication, Klingenheben's law is considered one of the two most impactful sound laws on Hausa's modern consonant inventory and syllable structure. The two processes are closely linked; earlier linguists, including Klingenheben, considered them to be part of the same process because they both occur in syllable coda only and lenite coronal obstruents to [r]. However, the law of codas in reduplication creates geminates from velars and labials instead of [w] and, while it has affected historical sound changes, it is still productive in modern Hausa. Klingenheben's law has been described as Hausa's best-known sound change.

== Description ==
Articulation of the mouth for each starting category of phoneme for the sound changes described by Klingenheben's law; from top to bottom: velar, coronal, bilabial, bilabial nasal

Klingenheben's law describes a series of four historical sound changes in Hausa which lenited – in other words, softened – its syllable-final consonants. When the consonant is found in the syllable onset, the surface and underlying representations of the sound match, but when the underlying consonant is found in coda, it is converted to its alternative surface form. For example, the infix -àa-, found in some plural words, affects the position of the alternating phoneme within the syllable by shifting the initial syllable's coda consonant to the onset of a new following syllable. In other words, the insertion of affixes can shift the position of the consonant from the syllable's end to the syllable's beginning, affecting the way that sound is pronounced based on that context, or alternation.

=== Velar rule ===
The velar rule affected Hausa's velar stops – /k/, /g/, and /kʼ/ – and probably their labialized forms – /kʷ/, /gʷ/, and /kʷʼ/ – which became the semivowel consonant [w] in syllable-final position. A clear example is ɓáunáa ('buffalo'), which is derived from an earlier form *ɓáknáa. There is a syllable boundary between the /k/ and the /n/ in this earlier form and, since the /k/ is a velar stop in syllable-final position, this stop was converted to [w]. In contrast, the plural form ɓákàanée contains the long vowel -àa- as an infix between /k/ and /n/, reorganizing the syllable structure. In this plural form, the /k/ is positioned at the start of the syllable -kàa- and is thus not affected by Klingenheben's law. While the velar rule does occur in word-final position, it is relatively rare.

=== Coronal rule ===
Similarly, the coronal rule, also referred to as the rhotacization rule, converted the coronal stops – /t/, /d/, and /ɗ/ – to a rolled [r], written as ⟨ř⟩ in the literature. (Note: The Latin symbols ⟨ř⟩ and ⟨r̃⟩ are used interchangeably by linguists for this "rolled/tap r". The retroflex flap /ɽ/ uses with the plain letter ⟨r⟩. Modern Hausa orthography does not distinguish between the two. This article uses ⟨ř⟩ for the coronal trill for clarity and consistency.) In the Western Hausa dialect, this rolled [r] resulted in the lateral liquid [l], probably developing as a later innovation from the rolled [r]. While the rule is thought to have also applied to the coronal affricate /t͡s/, other sound changes have obfuscated the data; there are no obvious examples of the process having affected it which are not explainable by other processes. The coronal rule is largely responsible for the rhotic distinction between the coronal trill [r] and the retroflex tap [ɽ] in modern Hausa. Examples of this contrast include the singular fářkée ('itinerant trader') with its plural form fátàakée, which contrasts with the fárkóo ('beginning') which has a retroflex tap in the same functional environment.

The coronal process has remained productive in modern Hausa; terms that exhibit underlyingly syllable-final coronal stops as a result of clipping demonstrate this rhotacism. Examples include the unclipped form 'yáatásà ('his daughter') with its clipped counterpart 'yářsà. Like the velar process, there are examples of the coronal process occurring in word-final position, such as kâř ('don't!'), though they are few in number. While Klingenheben originally included all coronal consonants, the evidence conclusively shows that only stops were affected by the process, though certain unexplainable alternations persist. Similarly, there are some examples of word-final /s/ alternation with [r], but these are rare and less commonly used. Klingenheben's analysis also provides for the inclusion of the syllable-final retroflex tap in this rule, but the tap is only replaced with the coronal trill in word-final position, not syllable-final position. Although examples of word-medial, syllable-final shifts from the retroflex tap to the coronal trill are attested, they are the result of other phonological processes. While the coronal fricatives /s/ and /z/ later assimilated to an adjacent /n/ (as evidenced by the lack of these clusters), this is not considered to be a process of Klingenheben's law and is rather a more recent development.

=== Labial rule ===
Like the velar rule, the labial rule renders the labial obstruents – /f/ (from its historical form /*p/), /b/, and /ɓ/ – as [w]. (Note: While Newman (2022) uses /u/ to describe the closing diphthong in accordance with Modern Hausa orthography, others, such as Trask (2000) and Hyman & Leben (2023), prefer [w]. Historically, this sound became [w] before developing later into /u/. This article uses [w] for consistency.) The labial process is restricted to the Eastern and Southern dialects of Hausa; it does not affect Western Hausa at all. For example, the Eastern and Southern form áudùgáa ('cotton') differs from its Western counterpart ábdùgáa. The labial process is considered incomplete, as it does not have the regular exceptionlessness typically required for a sound law to be considered such. Paul Newman considers the labial process to be a synchronic snapshot of a diachronic process; that is, the labial rule is a sound law in the process of developing. The change is almost fully completed when the consonant is followed by syllable-initial /ɽ/ or /ʃ/. When followed by syllable-initial /d/, /ɗ/, /d͡ʒ~ʒ/, or /k/, the process is unpredictable and lexically specific. If the following syllable-initial consonant is either /g/, /t/, or /t͡ʃ/, the process rarely occurs at all.

=== Nasal rule ===
The nasal rule affects the bilabial nasal /m/. It is the only one of the four rules in Klingenheben's law that affects a sound other than an obstruent. Like the labial and the velar rules, it converts the nasal into [w], though unlike either of the other rules, it requires that the following syllable-initial consonant be a coronal sonorant. The rule does not apply unless the /m/ occurs before a syllable-initial /r/ or /n/. The nasal process, like the labial process, is limited to particular dialects. In non-Western dialects, the /m/ will simply assimilate to the following consonant's point of articulation. Contrast the Western Hausa term gàmzáakìi ('morning star') with the dialectal variant gànzáakìi rather than *gàuzáakìi.

The nominal derivational suffix -níyáa, used for expressive depictions of sounds and actions, appears to block the nasal process altogether, as seen in the contrast between bàzàřníyáa ('moving around in ragged clothes'), which affects the preceding velar, and gwàlàmníyáa ('speaking unintelligibly'), where the /m/ and /n/ meet at the syllable boundary. Because of the distinct subsystem of behavior ideophones exhibited in Hausa, the effect of the -níyáa suffix is considered to be a morphological exception rather than a phonological one; that is, ideophones form a separate class of words which are not subject to the same phonological constraints as other classes.

=== Effect on vowels ===
The process sometimes affected the preceding vowels. In syllables where the final consonant is a velar and the preceding vowel was either /i/ or /u/, the resulting vowel was the long vowel uu. This change explains the relationship between words like jìkíi ('body'), which were not affected by the law, with those like júunáa ('one another'), which were affected. In this example, the historical form *jǐk-náa had its velar consonant /k/ affected by labializing process, becoming /w/. The resulting sequence *jǐw-náa was reinterpreted with the long vowel uu.

=== Blocking ===
Klingenheben's law has been used to describe possible explanations for geminate inalterability, a process wherein phonological rules affecting a short single phoneme – known as a "singleton segment" – are blocked in comparable positions when the phoneme is geminated. Hausa syllable structure does not allow for tautosyllabic consonant clusters and thus these geminates can be understood as heterosyllabic; that is, the geminate straddles both sides of the syllable boundary. Any syllable-final consonant which as a singleton would be converted to a sonorant in accordance with Klingenheben's law is not converted in this syllable-final position if it is a geminate.

== Relative chronology ==
Despite being clustered under the same umbrella term, the sound changes described by Klingenheben's law differed in chronology and manner of development. The linguistic evidence shows that all of the sound changes occurred sometime after word-medial ii and uu were lowered to ee and oo, respectively, which was an early sound change in the language's development. Given the earliness of this vowel sound change, most of the process is no longer observable, but a handful of verbal noun examples and high tone-only verbs with certain suffixes prove this chronology, such as góogèe ('rub') with its verbal noun counterpart gúugàa ('rubbing') and tsíirá ('escape') with its suffixed counterpart tséerèe ('escape from').

The internal order of the four Klingenheben's law sound changes, however, is unclear. The most recent are those affecting the labial obstruents and bilabial nasal. Given the coronal rule's persistence in modern Hausa, it is possible that the velar rule precedes it, though the coronal rule's exceptionlessness is also cause to credit it as older than the velar rule. Although Klingenheben viewed the labial obstruent and bilabial nasal changes as part of one rule affecting all labial consonants, this is no longer considered likely. The rules affecting both are restricted to dialectal speech and those affecting labial obstruents are applied under very specific conditions whereas the conditions of the labial nasal are exceptionless.

== See also ==
- Comparative linguistics – Branch of linguistics
- Geers's law – Akkadian sound law
- Glossary of sound laws in the Indo-European languages
- Russell Schuh – American linguist (1941–2016)
- Weise's law – Proto-Indo-European sound law
