= Asno law =

Proto-Indo-European sound change

In historical linguistics, the asno law is a sound law in Proto-Indo-European where word-medial consonant clusters containing underlying *-Cmn- tend to lose one of the nasal consonants *m or *n. This sound change was first documented by Johannes Schmidt in 1895 and is named for the Avestan reflex 𐬀𐬯𐬥𐬋 asnō. The asno law, along with Stang's law, is one of Proto-Indo-European's manifestations of a phonotactic restriction against multiple adjacent sonorants in the coda of a syllable.

== Affected affixes ==
The asno law is usually invoked to explain the disappearance of *-m- in the oblique case forms or thematic derivatives of animate-gender *-men- and *-mon- nouns, which have cases where a sequence *-mn- should appear. Thematic derivatives of neuter *-mn̥ nouns were also affected.

== Phonological conditioning ==
The conditions under which the asno law is triggered remain controversial and unsettled. It is usually supposed to be triggered when the *-mn- sequence follows a consonant; if the *-mn- is preceded by a short vowel, the asno rule does not apply.

Byrd has *-Cmn- losing the *m if the preceding syllable was accented and the *n if the following syllable has the accent. This account is rejected by Tijmen Pronk. Alexander Nikolaev also rejects the post-tonic *n-loss part of this account but instead posits that asno rule applied to delete either one of *m or *n (more often *n) when the next syllable is accented. The asno law would also be generalized to thematized derivatives of any nasal-stem noun, including *r/n-heteroclitic nouns, where the base noun would lose the stem-final nasal in composition.

Dissimilatory loss of *-m- in *-mn- when the root contained a labial consonant has been used to explain many cases of the asno rule. Pronk posits this dissimilation as the sole mechanism of the asno rule.

Adiego alternatively proposes that the asno rule was conditioned not by the accent, as Byrd believes, but instead by the ablaut grade of the root; the zero grade would cause the deletion of *-m- but with other grades, the *-n- would be lost instead.

== See also ==
- Glossary of sound laws in the Indo-European languages
