= Coronal =

Coronal may refer to:

- a nuptial crown
- anything relating to a corona
- Coronal plane, an anatomical term of location
- The coronal direction on a tooth
- Coronal consonant, a consonant that is articulated with the front part of the tongue
- Coronal stop, a type of stop consonant
- Coronal loop, a structure on the surface of the Sun
