= Boukólos rule =

Proto-Indo-European language sound law

The boukólos rule is a phonological rule of the Proto-Indo-European language (PIE). It states that a labiovelar stop (*kʷ, *gʷ, *gʷʰ) dissimilates to an ordinary velar stop (*k, *g, *gʰ) next to the vowel *u or its corresponding glide *w.

The rule is named after an example, the Ancient Greek word βουκόλος (bou-kólos; from Mycenaean Greek qo-u-ko-ro /ɡʷou̯kolos/) "cowherd", ultimately from Proto-Indo-European *gʷou-kolos, dissimilated from *gʷou-kʷolos. If the labiovelar had not undergone dissimilation, the word should have turned out as *bou-pólos, as in the analogously constructed αἰπόλος (ai-pólos) "goatherd" < *ai(ǵ)-kʷolos. The same dissimilated form *gʷou-kolos is the ancestor of Proto-Celtic *bou-koli-, the source of Welsh bugail (which would have had -b- rather than -g- if it had come from a form with *-kʷ-) and Irish buachaill, which is the common word for "boy" in the modern language.

Another example could be the Greek negation οὐκ[ί] (ouk[í]), which Warren Cowgill has interpreted as coming from pre-Greek *ojukid < *(ne) h₂oju kʷid, meaning approximately "not on your life". Without the boukólos rule, the result would have been *οὐτ[ί] (out[í]).

The rule is also found in Germanic, mainly in verbs, where labiovelars are delabialised by the epenthetic -u- inserted before syllabic resonants:

- Old High German queman ("to come"), past participle cuman ("come"), from Proto-Germanic *kwemaną and *kumanaz
- Gothic saiƕan, Old High German sehan ("to see"), past plural OHG sāgun ("saw"), from Proto-Germanic *sehwaną and *sēgun (*-g- results from earlier *-k- through Verner's law)

== See also ==
- Glossary of sound laws in the Indo-European languages
- Weise's law, a similar Proto-Indo-European sound law affecting the palatovelar consonants
