= Weise's law =

Proto-Indo-European sound law

In historical linguistics, Weise's law describes the loss of palatal quality that some consonants undergo in specific contexts in the Proto-Indo-European language. In short, when the palatovelar consonants *ḱ *ǵ *ǵʰ are followed by *r, they lose their palatal quality, leading to a loss in distinction between the series and the corresponding plain velar consonants *k *g *gʰ. Some exceptions exist, such as when the *r is followed by *i or when the palatal form is restored by analogy with related words. Although this sound change is most prominent in the satem languages, the change probably occurred prior to the centum–satem division, based on an earlier sound change which affected the distribution of Proto-Indo-European *u and *r. The law is named after the German linguist Oskar Weise, who first postulated it in 1881 in order to reconcile cognates in Ancient Greek and Sanskrit.

== Terminology ==
The Proto-Indo-European language is the reconstructed ancestor of all the Indo-European languages. It was spoken around the 4th millennium BC or earlier. No record of the language exists, but its forms have been reconstructed through the comparative method.

Weise's law describes a sound change that affects the palatovelar consonants of Proto-Indo-European, sometimes called dorso-palatal or simply palatal consonants. These sounds are articulated both with the back part of the tongue and the hard palate of the mouth, represented with *ḱ, *ǵ, and *ǵʰ, where the asterisk signifies a reconstructed or unattested form. They are contrasted with plain velar consonants, also referred to as dorso-velar or simply velar consonants, which are articulated with the back part of the tongue and the soft palate, represented by *k, *g, and *gʰ. Both of these sets were further contrasted with the labiovelar consonants, likely pronounced with a simultaneous articulation with the back part of the tongue against the soft palate and the rounding of the lips, represented by *kʷ, *gʷ, and *gʷʰ. These three contrastive sets are often known collectively as guttural consonants.

Although only one branch of the Indo-European language family – the Anatolian languages – maintained a distinction between all three sets of consonants, historical linguists divide the Indo-European daughter languages into two categories based on how these sounds developed, namely the centum and the satem languages. In the centum languages, the palatovelar sounds lost their palatal quality and merged with the plain velars, creating only a two-way contrast between the plain velar and labiovelar sounds. The terms centum and satem are derived from the Proto-Indo-European word *dḱm̥tóm, later shortened into *ḱm̥tóm, meaning 'one hundred'. Centum languages, named after the Latin word for 'one hundred', are those languages in which the palatovelar sounds underwent depalatalization – that is, lost their palatal quality – thereby merging with the plain velars, creating only a two-way contrast between the plain velar and labiovelar sounds. By contrast, satem languages, named after the Avestan word for 'one hundred' (𐬯𐬀𐬙𐬆𐬨, satəm), are those in which the labiovelar sounds lost their labialization, causing a lack of differentiation with the plain velar sounds called a merger. The palatovelar sounds, on the other hand, underwent assibilation – also called satemization in this particular context – whereby these palatovelars became sibilant consonants. Sibilant consonants comprise affricates, such as [t͡ʃ] (as in chat), and fricatives, such as [s] (as in sunk).

== History ==
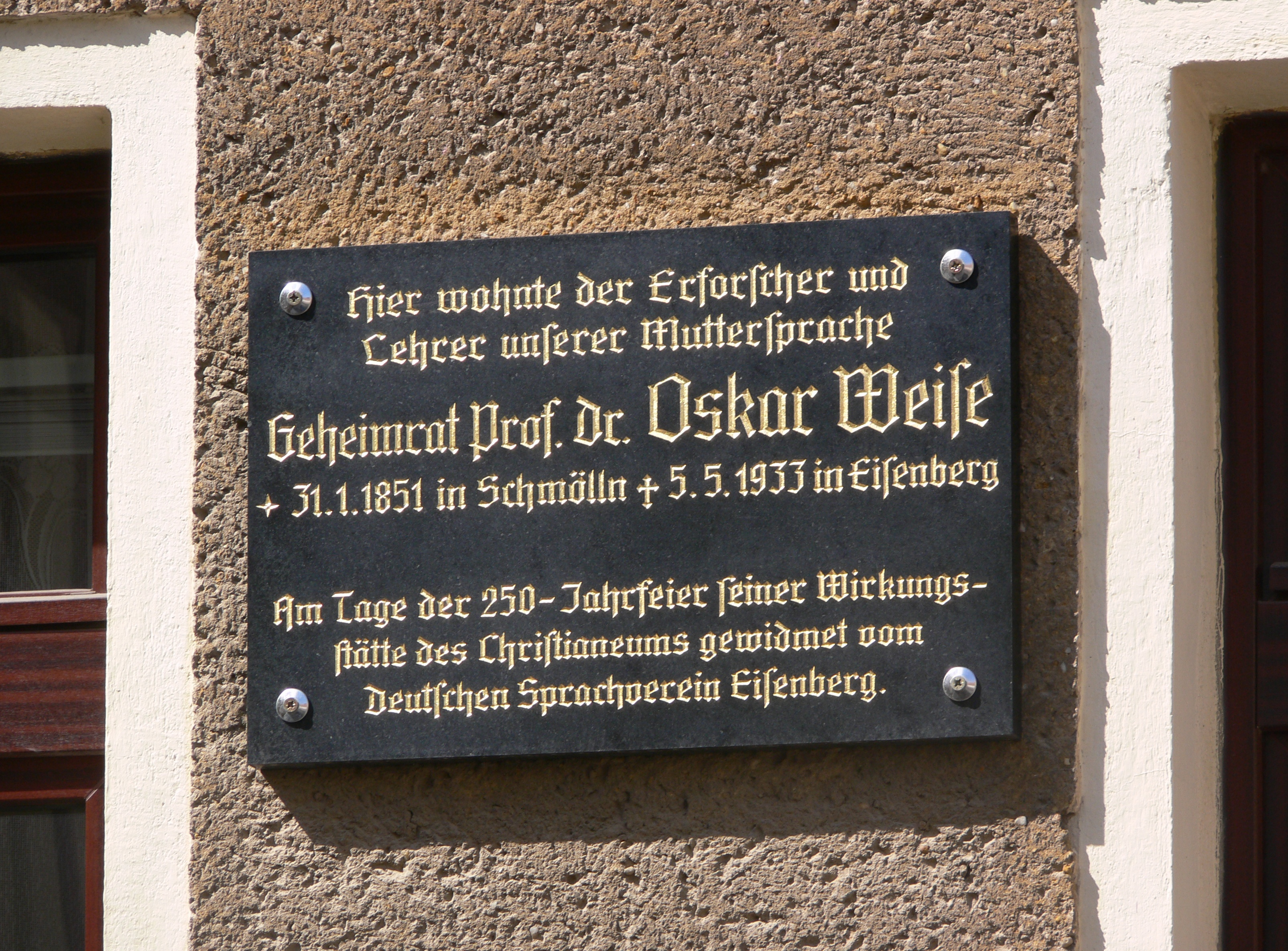
Commemorative plaque in Eisenberg, Germany: 'Here lived the researcher and teacher of our mother tongue, Geheimrat Prof. Dr. Oskar Weise...'

The German linguist Oskar Weise first described a problem in correspondences between Ancient Greek and Sanskrit cognates in his 1881 article "Ist anlautendes γ vor λ abgefallen?" ('Is initial γ dropped before λ?'). In it, he notes an imbalance in the relationship between Ancient Greek and Sanskrit cognates, writing:

If we examine the Indic words beginning with guttural + r or l and compare them with their Greek reflexes, we will notice that all those which have retained the guttural in Indic intact show guttural + ρ, whereas Greek guttural + λ only occurs regularly when the palatal sibilants [ś ], j, h appear in Indic. The absence of exceptions in this rule automatically prohibits the assumption that coincidence prevailed here. Of course, this excludes cases where r (or l ) is not immediately after the guttural, but there is a vowel in between, although the rule stated above often applies here too.

According to Alwin Kloekhorst in 2011, Weise's original article has "been largely forgotten by the scholarly world", but its findings have appeared sporadically in linguistic literature with some of it needing revision in light of other research. In 1894, Antoine Meillet described the law and defended it as established fact in a dissertation for the Société de Linguistique de Paris on the difficulty of determining gutturals in Proto-Indo-European, citing Weise as its progenitor. In 1978, Frederik Kortlandt similarly considered Weise's findings strong but limited in scope, citing both Weise's and Meillet's works on the law in his own research on the Balto-Slavic languages. In 1995, Robert S. P. Beekes also described the process derived from the law, but did not reference its origins with Weise. Kloekhorst presented a defense of the law in 2008, followed by a more complete account – Weise's Law: Depalatalization of Palatovelars before *r in Sanskrit – in 2011. The 2011 defense conglomerates several different sources on the topic, some referencing Weise and some not, and summarizes its general characteristics, its relative chronology, and possible violations. Kloekhorst has been credited with reviving interest in the law.

== Overview ==
Assibilation process: palatal stop ([c]), alveolar sibilant affricate ([t͡s]), and alveolar fricative ([s]).

Weise's law describes a depalatalization which affects the palatovelar consonants of Proto-Indo-European: *ḱ *ǵ *ǵʰ. In the satem languages, as well as in Albanian and Armenian, (Note: Albanian and Armenian have a controversial placement in centum–satem taxonomy. See § Relative chronology for further discussion.) these sounds became fricatives, such as [s] or [z], rather than remaining stops. Weise's law, however, demonstrates that these sounds depalatalize before *r, thereby merging with the plain velar stops *k *g *gʰ. Because the palatovelar sounds became sibilants through the process of assibilation in the satem languages while the plain velars did not, the merging of palatovelars with plain velars explains why these words have plain velar reflexes in words that share a common Indo-European root containing a palatovelar. In other words, while the palatovelar stops were made into alveolar sibilants in most cases, Weise's law explains many exceptions, though not all. The effects of the law are commonly found in zero-grade stems – that is, stems without a vowel – which may receive inserted vowels in the daughter languages. One such example may be found in Old Avestan 𐬐𐬆𐬵𐬭𐬞𐬇𐬨 (kəhrpə̄m; 'figure, body'), derived from *ḱrp-os- 'body'. (Note: Although de Vaan posits the palatovelar form *ḱrp- as a possible reconstruction, other linguists – such as Ranko Matasović and Guus Kroonen – have reconstructed the root as *krep- (zero-grade *krp-) without the palatovelar.) Although the original palatovelar *ḱ does not immediately precede *r in the Avestan reflex, it is still in accordance with the depalatalization described by Weise's law since *ḱ immediately precedes *r in the zero-grade form *ḱrp-os-.

Sanskrit contains many apparent violations of the rule, particularly where the surface representation of the word contains śr- or hr-, implying a derivation from an unmodified *ḱr- or *ǵʰr- source. However, these are often the result of later sound changes particular to a language or language family. For example, where /l/ became /r/ in many circumstances, such as in श्रवस् (śravas, 'fame'), which is derived from Proto-Indo-European *ḱleu-es-, and ह्राद् (hrād; 'to resound, to make a noise'), which is derived from *ǵʰleh₃d-. Thus, these apparent counterexamples do not actually represent exceptions to the rule.

Other apparent violations occur in contexts in which the palatovelar consonant and *r cross a morphemic boundary, such as between an affix and the root it modifies, or share a clear derivational relationship with another word that would not have been subjected to the sound law, leading to an analogical change. With respect to the first apparent violation, the Sanskrit word अज्र (ájra; 'field, plain') is derived from *h₂éǵ-ro- ('field, pasturage'), where the expected outcome is *अग्र (*ágra). (Note: The term अग्र (ágra; 'foremost, summit') is an attested form in Sanskrit, but it is either a derivative of अङ्ग् (aṅg, 'to go') or otherwise related to Latvian agrs ('early').) However, the typical reflex of the palatovelar consonant has been restored because the palatovelar and the *r are separated by a morphemic boundary, represented here with a dash. In another apparent violation, Sanskrit शृङ्ग (śṛṅgá, 'horn') is derived from the zero-grade form *ḱr-n-go-. Although the expected reflex is *क्ङ्ग (*kṛṅgá), the attested form may have been restored based on a relationship with related words like शरभ (śarabhá, 'a kind of deer'), which is derived from a full-grade form of the root, *ḱer-n-bʰó- where the *r is not immediately preceded by the palatovelar.

All other violations of the rule appear in the particular sequence *Ḱri, where Ḱ represents any palatovelar sound. Kloekhorst suggests that the high front vowel *i may have palatalized the preceding *r, giving no motivation to depalatalize the initial palatovelar sound.

== Relative chronology ==
Migrations by the Yamnaya culture from around Pontic–Caspian steppe likely spread the Indo-European languages through parts of Europe and Asia during the 3rd millennium BC, which supports the steppe hypothesis in the Proto-Indo-European homeland debate. Estimated range of the Yamnaya culture before its migration Extent of modern Indo-European languages in Europe and Asia

The chronology of Weise's law is the subject of some debate. The depalatalization described by the law must have occurred by at least the time the Indo-Iranian languages diverged from the rest of Proto-Indo-European (c. 3000 BC). Kloekhorst argues that it probably occurred much earlier, after the divergence of the Anatolian languages (c. 4500 BC), since the distribution of late Proto-Indo-European *u and *r underwent an exchange in placement, or metathesis, which only occurred after both the Anatolian language family had diverged from Proto-Indo-European and palatovelars had undergone the depalatalization described by Weise's law. This explains exceptions such as Sanskrit श्मश्रु (śmáśru, 'beard'), which derives from the form *smóḱ-ru- rather than from the earlier *smóḱ-ur, attested in Hittite 𒍝𒈠𒀭𒆳 (zama(n)kur, 'beard'). The Sanskrit form does not show depalatalization because the depalatalization occurred only in environments where the palatovelar was followed by *r prior to this metathesis. (Note: Albanian mjekër ('chin, beard') and Lithuanian smãkras ('chin') also derive from *smóḱ-ru-; however, the presence of plain velars suggests a later depalatalization in Albanian and Balto-Slavic.)

In 1978, Frederik Kortlandt noted that, while it is tempting to assert that Balto-Slavic and Indo-Iranian depalatalizations derive from a common innovation, the scope of depalatalization is much larger in the Balto-Slavic languages and there is positive evidence that this kind of depalatalization never occurred in Armenian, pointing to examples like սրունք (srunkʿ, 'leg') from Proto-Indo-European *ḱrūs-ni- and մերձ (merj; 'near, close to') from *méǵʰ(s)ri. Instead, Kortlandt suggested that Weise's law applies only to Indo-Iranian languages and, although Indo-Iranian languages and Balto-Slavic languages restored palatal features in a similar fashion, these restorations occurred independently of one another. Based on Albanian and Balto-Slavic agreement in depalatalization, he considers Albanian to have been a transitional dialect of Balto-Slavic and Armenian during the same period. Robert S. P. Beekes, disputing some of Kortlandt's etymologies, wrote that depalatalization is assumed to have taken place before *r in Armenian as well.

Although the effects of the law are most clearly demonstrated in satem languages, Kloekhorst suggests that this sound change occurred before the centum–satem split, arguing that it almost certainly occurred in late Proto-Indo-European after the departure of the Anatolian languages. Because their reflexes appear to be in accordance with the law, Kloekhorst groups Albanian and Armenian in with the satem languages. (Note: This opinion is not unique to Kloekhorst; many linguists also categorize Albanian and Armenian as satem languages. R. L. Trask also categorizes both as satem languages, but cautions that Albanian can only be categorized as such "with qualifications".) He further notes that it is likely that secondary depalatalizations took place at a later date in each of the satem language families outside the Indo-Iranian languages, as depalatalization is more extensive in those languages.

== See also ==
- Boukólos rule – a similar rule affecting labiovelar consonants in Proto-Indo-European, which affected the centum languages
- Glossary of sound laws in the Indo-European languages
- Ruki sound law – a rule triggered in part by Proto-Indo-European *r in the satem languages
