= Glossary of sound laws in the Indo-European languages =

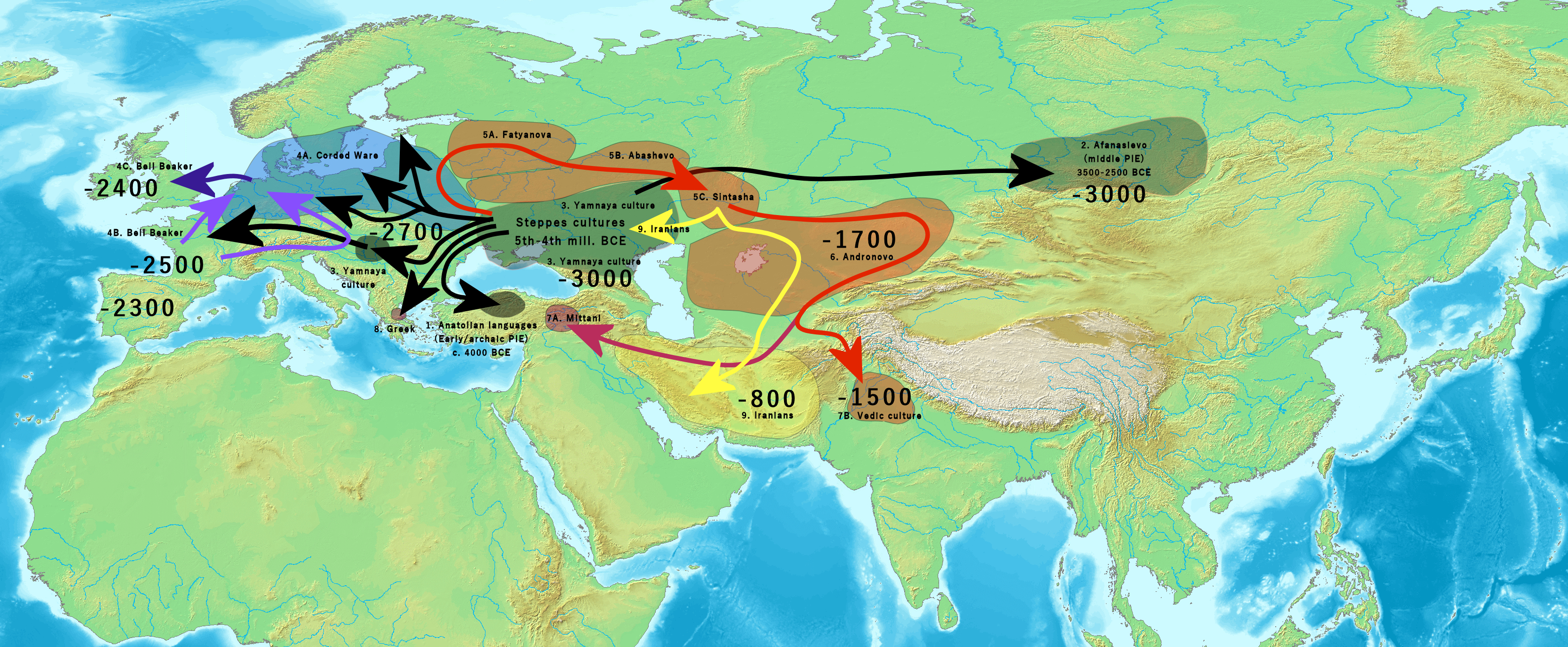
A map showing various migrations of Indo-European peoples across Eurasia with their estimated dates

The Indo-European language family comprises a vast number of languages and dialects spoken throughout the world today. All of these languages are descended from a common ancestor known as Proto-Indo-European, which scholars estimate was spoken about six thousand years ago. This common ancestor has been reconstructed by historical linguists using the comparative method. Sound laws are regular instances of change to a language's phonological system, typically viewed as exceptionless under the Neogrammarian hypothesis. For example, the Romance languages, all descended from Latin, each have sound changes that affect the Latin c sound before a front vowel, leading to the pronunciation of [t͡ʃ] in Italian (cento, 'one hundred'; cielo, 'sky') but [s] in French (cent, ciel) and [θ] in European Spanish (cien, cielo). By tracking these kinds of changes, linguists can map out the relationships between languages with common origins.

This glossary provides a list of sound laws that have been formulated by linguists for the various Indo-European languages. It contains any named sound law which affects any of the major branches of the Indo-European family or more than one descendant language. Laws affecting one language may be included if a family has fewer than five well-attested members. While it is generally thought that the Anatolian languages broke off first, (Note: See Kloekhorst (2022) for a survey of positions on this topic. Kloekhorst, however, concludes that the Indo-Anatolian position is "virtually proven".) the internal relations of the other widely-accepted subfamilies – Albanian, Armenian, Balto-Slavic, Celtic, Germanic, Hellenic, Indo-Iranian, Italic, and Tocharian – are unclear and the subject of scholarly debate.

== Proto-Indo-European or multiple branches ==
Migrations by the Yamnaya culture from around Pontic–Caspian steppe likely spread the Indo-European languages through parts of Europe and Asia during the 3rd millennium BC, which supports the steppe hypothesis in the Proto-Indo-European homeland debate. Estimated range of the Yamnaya culture before its migration Extent of modern Indo-European languages in Europe and Asia

asno law
The word-medial sequence *-mn- is simplified after long vowels and diphthongs or after a short vowel if the sequence was tautosyllabic and preceded by a consonant. The *n was deleted if the vocalic sequence following the cluster was accented, as in Ancient Greek θερμός (thermós, 'warm') from Proto-Indo-European *gʷʰermnós ('warm'); otherwise, the *m was deleted, as in Sanskrit अश्नः (áśnaḥ) from Proto-Indo-European *h₂éḱmnes (genitive singular of 'anvil'). The sequence remains if the *-mn- sequence is heterosyllabic, such as in Ancient Greek πρύμνος (prýmnos, 'prominent'). The law was first discovered by Johannes Schmidt in 1895 and is named for the Avestan reflex 𐬀𐬯𐬥𐬋 (asnō).
aspirate throwback
(Greek, Sanskrit) Also, aspiration throwback. When a root-final aspirated stop loses its aspiration, typically due to another process, the aspiration is retracted to the initial consonant whenever that initial consonant is capable of taking an aspirated quality. One example includes the Ancient Greek root τρίχ- (tríkh-, 'hair'), which becomes θρίξ (thríx) in the nominative form. The process was mentioned earlier by the Sanskrit scholar Pāṇini, but brought to modern scholarship in the first clause of a two-part law proposed by Hermann Grassmann in 1863, though the name "aspirate throwback" appears later. (Note: Trask (2000) credits Collinge (1985) with naming the process, but in the work cited, Collinge states that others have "fashionably called" it by this name prior to publication.) The second clause is now referred to alone as Grassmann's law.
Bartholomae's law
Also, Buddha rule. If a cluster of two or more obstruents contains at least one voiced aspirated consonant, the whole cluster becomes voiced and aspirated. The process may have been inherited from Proto-Indo-European, though this is not universally accepted. The law is named after the German linguist Christian Bartholomae who discussed outcomes of the process in the various Indo-Iranian languages in 1882. The alternative name stems from the fact that the etymon for the Sanskrit word बुद्ध (buddhá; 'awake, enlightened') is affected by this process, derived from *bʰewdʰ, meaning 'to be awake', and *-tó-, the passive past participle suffix.
Beekes's law
In word-initial position, when a string consisting of a resonant followed by a laryngeal and then a consonant, the laryngeal is vocalized based on its laryngeal coloring. Examples of this process include Latin lassus ('tired') from Proto-Indo-European *lh₂dʰtos, where *h₂ is an *a-coloring laryngeal. The law is named after the Dutch linguist Robert S. P. Beekes who first proposed the process in 1988; the first use of the appellation in the literature was in a 2009 work by the American linguist Michael Weiss.
boukólos rule
Labiovelars lose their labialization and become plain velars when preceded or followed by *w or *u. This dissimilatory process explains the reflex in words like Ancient Greek βουκόλος (boukólos, 'cowherd'), derived from Proto-Indo-European *gʷoukʷólos. The expected form *βουπόλος (*boupólos) does not appear because the initial *kʷ in *kʷólos is preceded by the *u in *gʷou-, whereas in αιπόλος (aipólos, 'goatherd'), the expected form -πόlos (-pólos) is attested, derived from Proto-Indo-European *ai(ǵ)kʷólos. This process remained productive into Proto-Germanic, where it also came to apply to labiovelars preceded by *-un- through an assimilatory process which caused *n to have a labialized allophone. Examples of this include Proto-Germanic *tungōn- from Proto-Indo-European *dn̥ǵʰwéh₂- both meaning 'tongue', whence both Latin lingua (from Old Latin dengua) and English tongue (from Old English tunge).
centumization
(Celtic, Germanic, Greek, Italic, Tocharian) The palatovelar consonants *ḱ, *ǵ, and *ǵʰ undergo a merger with the plain velars consonants *k, *g, and *gʰ, causing the palatovelar series to disappear entirely. This process contrasts with the satemization, where the labiovelar series merges with the plain velars and the palatovelars assibilate. The Anatolian languages are sometimes categorized as having undergone centumization; evidence from Luwian suggests the tripartite distinction persisted, but Hittite does not appear to have such evidence. (Note: Compare Hittite 𒆠𒀉𒋫 (kitta) but Luwian 𒍣𒄿𒀀𒅈 (ziyar), both from Proto-Indo-European *ḱéy(t)or.) The American linguist H. Craig Melchert considers Anatolian to have undergone the process eventually, but that the apparent three-way distinction in the Luwic languages are the result of conditional changes prior to centumization rather than a wholesale import of the original system. The name is derived from the Latin word for 'one hundred' derived from a Proto-Indo-European root which began with a palatovelar.
double-dental rule
When two dental consonants form a consonant cluster, a sibilant is epenthesized between the dental consonants. Examples include Proto-Indo-European *witsto- ('seen, known'), which is underlyingly *wid-tó-. Whether this should be interpreted as *s-insertion or affrication is debated.
Dybo's law
Laryngeal consonants are lost between a vowel and any other consonant in pretonic syllables. Examples of this include Proto-Celtic *wiro- (whence Old Irish fer, meaning 'man'), Latin vir ('man'), and Old English wer ('man'), all of which are derived from Proto-Indo-European *wiHró-. If the vowel is long before the process occurs, it is shortened. The process likely did not take place in Proto-Indo-European as it only affected the western Indo-European languages; examples from eastern families show laryngeal retention, such as Lithuanian výras ('man, husband') and Sanskrit वीरः (vīráḥ; 'man, hero'). The law is named for the Russian linguist Vladimir Dybo, who published work on the topic in 1961.
Eichner's law
(Controversial) The long vowel *ē does not undergo laryngeal coloring with *h₂ and *h₃, the *a-coloring and *o-coloring laryngeals, respectively. The law is named for the German-Austrian linguist Heiner Eichner who first proposed the law in 1973 to explain the derivation of Hittite mēḫur ('time, period') from Proto-Indo-European *meh₂-, making it cognate with Latin mātūrus ('ripe, mature') and providing several other examples. The Dutch linguist Tijmen Pronk has cast doubt on the validity of the law, arguing that most, if not all, purported etymologies can be explained through other means. Frederik Kortlandt similarly rejects the law as an example of intellectual laziness. Still, other linguists – such as Vincent Martzloff and Barbora Machajdíková – argue that while Pronk and others have successfully settled several edge cases, the law is still valid.
Grassmann's law
(Greek, Indo-Aryan, Tocharian) Also, Graßmann's law; ha-ha rule; breath dissimilation. When an aspirated consonant is followed by another aspirated consonant in same or following syllable, the first consonant loses its aspiration. The process evolved independently in Greek and Sanskrit; the process did not affect Mycenaean Greek at all. Examples of pairs affected by this process include Ancient Greek θρίξ (thríx, 'hair') in the nominative case, but τριχός (trikhós) in the genitive case. Hermann Grassmann first proposed this process in 1863 as the second clause of a two-part law. The first clause is now known as the aspirate throwback. The law remained productive after the Greek devoicing of aspirates and /h/, (Note: Initial /h/ in Ancient Greek is represented by the diacritical mark ⟨◌̔⟩ appearing over the following vowel. For further discussion, see Rough breathing.) from earlier *s, which behaved as an aspirated stop. The process was slow to spread around the different Ancient Greek dialects, with one estimate dating the first occurrences to around the 9th century BC, not reaching the Boeotian dialect around Thebes until some time after 550 BC. This sound change likely also took place at some point between Proto-Indo-European and Proto-Tocharian based on the behavior of *dʰ in word-initial position. A variation of this law was applied to Latin, called the limited Latin Grassman's law, to explain why expected sound changes did not occur to word-initial aspirates, such as *dʰragʰeti ('drags') becoming Latin trahit rather than the expected *frahit. The American linguist Michael Weiss concludes that the Latin reflexes can be explained through other means.
Kortlandt effect
(Not fully accepted) Proto-Indo-European *d undergoes debuccalization, becoming the laryngeal *h₁, whenever it is followed by a dental consonant, a consonant followed by a dental, or whenever the following syllable begins with a dental. Examples include Ancient Greek ἑκατόν (hekatón, 'one hundred') from *dḱm̥tom, where the simple loss of the initial *d is attested in forms like Latin centum and Sanskrit शतम् (śatám), but the debuccalization of *d instead of deletion adequately explains the initial aspirate in the Greek term and the deletion in other languages. The process also explains the relationship between the Ancient Greek terms δρέπω (drépō, 'I pluck'), from the Proto-Indo-European root *drep-, and Homeric Greek *ἐρέπτομαι (*eréptomai; 'I feed on, I munch'), (Note: The verb is attested only in its present participle form ἐρέπτόμενοι (eréptómenoi). The term is attested in the Odyssey where the men pluck and eat the lotus.) from the same root affected by the debuccalization (*h₁rep-). The law is named after the Dutch linguist Frederik Kortlandt, who first proposed the sound change in 1983. The debuccalization appears to have taken place before the Anatolian languages split off from Proto-Indo-European.
Kuiper's law
Laryngeals are lost in utterance-final position. The process does not cause compensatory lengthening. One form of the Latin nominative singular, which ends in -a rather than the expected *-ā, is thought to be derived from an earlier usage of the vocative case, which would have invoked the law; this process did not affect the related Sabellic languages, however. The process similarly affected the vocative in Ancient Greek as well. The law is named for the Dutch linguist F. B. J. Kuiper, who published work on this process in 1955.
*kʷetwóres rule
In a word of three syllables with a vowel pattern *é-o-V, where V is any vowel, the accent is moved forward to the middle syllable, becoming *e-ó-V. This explains the penultimate accent in terms like Vedic Sanskrit चत्वारः (catvā́raḥ), the nominative plural form of 'four', from Proto-Indo-European *kʷetwóres. The law is named after this example.
Lindeman's law
Proto-Indo-European monosyllabic words beginning with a consonant–resonant pair may vocalize the resonant and place a new resonant between it and the following vowel, giving way to an alternative disyllabic form. Examples of this process include the Proto-Indo-European word *dwóh₁ ('two') leading to Sanskrit द्वा (dvā́), but the Lindeman form *duwóh₁ leading to Latin duō and Ancient Greek δύω (dýō). The process is often connected to Sievers's law, in part due to its being based against Edgerton's converse, though Byrd disputes that the processes are connected at all. The law is named for the Norwegian linguist Fredrik Otto Lindeman, who first discussed the topic in 1965.
métron rule
In a dental–dental–resonant sequence, one of the dental consonants is deleted and there is no compensatory lengthening. Evidence from Latin and Gaulish seems to suggest that the second dental consonant was simply deleted, but evidence from Greek and Sanskrit indicates that the second dental consonant underwent voicing assimilation and then the resulting geminate was shortened; Proto-Germanic evidence provides examples of both. The name is derived from the Greek term μέτρον (métron, 'measure'), derived from Proto-Indo-European *méd-tro-.
neognós rule
Laryngeals are lost in zero-grade contexts where full-grade root contains a consonant–vowel–resonant–laryngeal string, in that order, in certain reduplicated forms and in some other compounds. Examples include the Ancient Greek term νεογνός (neognós, 'newborn'); the Greek term is derived from Proto-Indo-European *newoǵn̥h₁o- through the medial form *newoǵno-.
Osthoff's law
Long vowels shorten when they follow a resonant–stop cluster or a resonant followed by *s. The process explains why words like Latin ventus ('wind'), Old Irish fét ('whistle'), Gothic 𐍅𐌹𐌽𐌳𐍃 (winds, 'wind'), and Tocharian A want ('wind') all have short vowels, despite being derived from a late Proto-Indo-European etymon with a long *ē, *wēnto- from earlier *h₂wenh₁ntó- ('wind'). The law is named after the German linguist Hermann Osthoff, who first postulated the process in 1879, followed by two important reanalyses in 1881 and 1884, though this particular appellation was not universal until as late as 1939.
Pinault's law
(Not fully accepted) Also, Pinault's rule. Laryngeals are dropped in word-medial position between a consonant and *y, such as in Latin socius ('friend') from Proto-Indo-European *sokʷh₂-yo-. Only *h₂ and *h₃ appear to have been affected, though the law has been invoked to explain instances of *h₁'s disappearance in the same context, such as Proto-Celtic *gan-yo- ('to be born') from Proto-Indo-European *ǵnh₁yetor. To explain some apparent counterexamples, the American linguist Andrew Miles Byrd has argued that the law only occurs when the laryngeal and the *y are tautosyllabic and the laryngeal is in the onset. The law is named for the French linguist Georges-Jean Pinault, whose 1982 work confirmed, with corrections, earlier work done by Jacob Wackernagel.
Rix's law
(Greek, Italic, Celtic) In zero-grade roots, when a laryngeal is followed by a syllabic resonant and at least one other consonant, the laryngeal is replaced with its respectively colored vowel. (Note: It is unclear through what medial step, if any, the process occurred; Beckwith (2013) argues that a schwa occurred through prothesis and that vowel was thereby colored by the following laryngeal, while Höfler (2024) indicates that the laryngeal underwent direct vocalization to the respective coloring vowel. Both approaches to zero-grade coloring have supporters, though Byrd (2015) argues that the epenthetic vowel approach has more support.) Examples of the process include Proto-Indo-European *h₂ŕ̥tḱos ('bear'), where *h₂ is *a-coloring, becoming Ancient Greek ᾰ̓́ρκτος (árktos) as compared with Hittite 𒄯𒁖𒂵𒀸 (ḫartaggas), which preserves the laryngeal, and Sanskrit ऋक्षः॑ (ṛ́kṣaḥ), which deletes the laryngeal. The process is generally assumed to have occurred in both Greek and Latin, though it is not universally accepted in the latter. The Celtic languages show a "limited version" where the laryngeal invariably becomes Proto-Celtic *a, irrespective of laryngeal color. Examples include Old Irish ortae ('was slain') from Proto-Indo-European *h₃r̥g-to-, where *h₃ is *o-coloring, and Middle Irish art ('bear') from Proto-Indo-European *h₂ŕ̥tḱos. The law is named for the German linguist Helmut Rix who first suggested the concept in 1970 for Ancient Greek.
ruki sound law
(Balto-Slavic, Indo-Iranian, Albanian, Armenian) Also, RUKI; ruki; ruki rule; ruki change; iurk rule; Pedersen's law. In the satem languages, Proto-Indo-European *s is retracted when preceded by *r, *u, *k, or *i. In Indo-Iranian, the phoneme retracted to š, while in Slavic it further retracted into x in most circumstances. This change is not generally believed to be commonly derived from an earlier common innovation, but rather were independently conditioned. In Indo-Iranian, the sound change caused the retroflexion of t, d, and n in the same contexts, not just s. Similarly, it does not appear that the Baltic languages underwent the full process. The consonants *g and *gʰ are sometimes considered to trigger the law as well. The name is derived from the constituent letters which govern the change. Its order is a Russian mnemonic device; ruki (руки) means 'hands'. Although the concept was articulated as early as 1818 by Rasmus Rask, the alternative name is derived from Holger Pedersen, who wrote about the process in detail.
satemization
(Balto-Slavic, Indo-Iranian, Albanian, Armenian) (Note: The positioning of Albanian and Armenian within the centum–satem dichotomy is the subject of scholarly debate. Alwin Kloekhorst, Robert S. P. Beekes, and Mate Kapović categorize both as satem. R. L. Trask describes Armenian as fully satem, but Albanian only as satem "with qualifications". Adam Hyllested and Brian Joseph categorize both as having preserved the three-way distinction with some later changes obscuring that categorization, meaning that neither language can be placed within the dichotomy.) Also, satəmization. The labiovelar consonants *kʷ, *gʷ, and *gʷʰ lose their labialization, thereby merging with the plain velar consonants *k, *g, and *gʰ. The palatovelar series *ḱ, *ǵ, and *ǵʰ undergo assibilation. This process contrasts with centumization, where the palatovelar series merges with the plain velars and creates a two-way contrast with the labiovelars. The term satemization is sometimes used to refer specifically to the assibilation process without reference to the merger. The name is derived from the Avestan reflex of the Proto-Indo-European word for 'one hundred', which began with a palatovelar.
Saussure effect
(Not fully accepted) Also, de Saussure's law; Saussure–Hirt effect; Saussure–Hirt law. When a word-initial laryngeal–resonant cluster is followed by *o or when a word-medial *o is followed by a laryngeal–resonant–consonant string, the laryngeal consonant is deleted. The process does not cause comprensatory lengthening. Examples of the process include Greek μοιχός (moikhós, 'adulterer'), from Proto-Indo-European *h₃moyǵʰ-, when contrasted with its e-grade counterpart ὀμείχω (omeíkhō, 'I urinate'), from Proto-Indo-European *h₃meyǵʰ-. The law is named for the Swiss linguist Ferdinand de Saussure who first described the process in 1905. The alternative name is derived from its prominence in the German linguist Hermann Hirt's 1921 handbook on Indo-European vocalism. Some linguists, such Tijmen Pronk and Lucien van Beek have cast doubt on the validity of the process. Van Beek, for example, argues that the law is inconsistently applied, can usually be explained through other means, and that the *o was not always a condition of laryngeal loss.
Schmidt–Hackstein's law
Also, Schmidt's law; Schmidt–Hackstein rule; lex Schmidt–Hackstein. If a syllable-final laryngeal consonant is preceded by a consonant and followed by a consonant cluster, the laryngeal is deleted. The law is named for the German linguists Gernot Schmidt and Olav Hackstein. Schmidt first proposed the process in 1973 as a process of the Indo-Iranian languages to reconcile the broad number of variants of the word 'daughter' in the Iranian languages. In 2002, Hackstein developed a syllable-based approach which solved several apparent exceptions.
schwa secundum
In word-initial position, a stop–stop–resonant sequence has a schwa inserted after the first stop unless the resonant is *y. Examples include Latin pandō ('I spread out') and Ancient Greek πίτνημι (pítnēmi, 'to spread out'), both from Proto-Indo-European *ptneh₂-, but there is no such evidence of epenthesis in *ǵʰ(z)dʰyés ('yesterday'). If a word initial cluster begins with an *s and is then followed by a stop–stop–resonant sequence, the rule still holds. Examples include Tocharian B katnaṃ ('he strews, he sews [seeds]') and Ancient Greek σκίδναμαι (skídnamai, first-person singular mediopassive indicative of 'to scatter'), both from *sḱdnh₂-.
Schwebeablaut
When a resonant occurs in a cluster, either in syllable onset or syllable coda, it metathesizes with the internal vowel. Examples include the alternation between *h₂awg ('grow, become strong') and *h₂weks. The former is the origin of Sanskrit ओजीयस् (ójīyas; 'stronger, mightier') and Latin augeō ('increase, enlarge'), while the latter is the etymon of Vedic Sanskrit वक्षयति (vakṣayati; 'to make stronger, to fortify') and Ancient Greek ἀϝέξω (awéksō). Byrd considers the process an attempt to avoid superheavy or overlong syllabic structures. The name is derived from a German-language term meaning 'hovering vowel alternation'.
Siebs's law
(Not fully accepted) If an s-mobile is added to a root that begins with a voiced consonant, that consonant is devoiced. If it is aspirated, it retains its aspiration, giving a tripartite alternation between the s-mobilized, plain, and voiced unaspirated forms. The law is named after the German linguist Theodor Siebs who first proposed the concept in 1901, though it was not published until 1904.
Sievers's law
Also, Sievers–Edgerton law; Sievers's rule. When a word-medial consonant is followed by a glide in an unaccented syllable, a high vowel – either *i or *u – is inserted if the preceding syllable is heavy. Examples of this include *mert-yo- becoming *mertiyo-, whence Sanskrit मर्त्यः (mártiyaḥ, 'mortal'), and *ḱerdʰ-yo- becoming *ḱerdʰiyo-, whence Gothic 𐌷𐌰𐌹𐍂𐌳𐌴𐌹𐍃 (hairdeis, 'herdsman'). Alternations including *u did not persist into Proto-Germanic. Although it has been obfuscated by other phonological processes in Albanian, Armenian, Slavic, and Celtic languages, all other branches of Indo-European show evidence of these alternations. The law is named for the German philologist Eduard Sievers, who first promulgated the concept in 1878. The extensions made by Franklin Edgerton in 1934 and 1943 to Sievers's work are sometimes called Edgerton's converse or the converse of Sievers's law, which led to the double-jointed name. The process is often linked with Lindeman's law.
Stang's law
When *w, *h₂, or *m precede a word-final *m, it is dropped and the preceding vowel undergoes compensatory lengthening. Examples of this include *dyḗm (accusative singular of 'daylight') from an underlying **dyéw-m form. The law is named after the Norwegian linguist Christian Stang who first articulated the concept in 1965.
Streitberg's law
(Not widely accepted) When a full-grade syllable is stressed and followed by a deleted syllable, the vowel becomes long. The process was reevaluated by Julius Purczinsky in 1970, but N. E. Collinge finds it unconvincing. The law is named for the German linguist Wilhelm Streitberg, who discussed the process in two articles published in 1893 and 1894.
Szemerényi's law
1. (Not fully accepted) In pre-Proto-Indo-European, the word-final fricatives *s and *h₂ are deleted following a vowel–resonant sequence, followed by compensatory lengthening. Some linguists include in the law a process where if the resulting sequence is *-ōn, the *n is also dropped, but others describe that deletion as a separate process. The law is named after the Hungarian-British linguist Oswald Szemerényi who first described the process in 1956.
2. Also, broad Szemerényi's law; final Szemerényi's law. In pre-Proto-Indo-European, syllable-final fricatives are deleted following a vowel–consonant sequence, followed by compensatory lengthening. The process is blocked if the consonant preceding the fricative is in a cluster or if the following syllable begins with a consonant.
thorn cluster reduction
Before a syllabic nasal consonant, dental–dorsal clusters lost their dental. Examples include Latin humus ('ground, floor') and Ancient Greek χαμαί (khamaí, 'on the ground') from a medial Proto-Indo-European form *ǵʰm̥m- originating as Proto-Indo-European *dʰéǵʰōm, which gave Hittite 𒋼𒂊𒃷 (tékan, 'earth') and χθών (khthṓn, 'earth') with the schwa secundum. Within Proto-Indo-European itself, the term *ḱm̥tóm is derived from an earlier form *dḱmtóm, derived from *dékm̥ ('ten'). The name is derived from an earlier assumption that these clusters could be identified as a cluster of a Proto-Indo-European velar consonant followed by a dental fricative; the German linguist Karl Brugmann represented the dental fricative with the Germanic rune þ known as thorn in 1895.
thorn cluster epenthesis
If both consonants in a dental–dorsal cluster belong to the same syllable, an *s is inserted between them. Some linguists prefer to describe the process as affrication rather than epenthesis. The name is derived from an earlier assumption that these clusters could be identified as a cluster of a Proto-Indo-European velar consonant followed by a dental fricative; the German linguist Karl Brugmann represented the dental fricative with the Germanic rune þ known as thorn in 1895.
Wackernagel's law
In compounds, the first vowel is deleted as the word undergoes crasis; the remaining vowel is sometimes then lengthened. It is unclear which languages this rule fully applied to; it certainly applies to Ancient Greek and Wagernackel's original formulation included the Indo-Iranian languages as well. Examples of the process include Ancient Greek στρατηγός (stratēgós, 'general'), composed of στρατός (stratós, 'army') and ἀγός (agós, 'leader'). (Note: Compare also the form στρᾰτᾱγός (strătāgós), an alternative form found in Arcadian and Doric Greek. This form shows the lengthening remaining vowel without a subsequent vowel change.) The process sometimes occurs between words in addition to compounds, but it is relatively rare and may be guided by meter constraints, at least in Greek. The law is named after the Swiss linguist Jacob Wackernagel who is credited with first describing the process in 1889.
weather rule
Also, Wetter-Regel, Wetter rule. Laryngeals are lost in word-medial position preceding a stop followed by a resonant and a vowel. The law is named for two of its Germanic reflexes, English weather and German Wetter, which are both derived from Proto-Indo-European *weh₁dʰrom ('weather'); the laryngeal *h₁ is deleted before the sequence *-dʰro- which comprises a stop, a resonant, and a vowel, respectively. The law does not cause compensatory lengthening.
Weise's law
The palatovelar consonants *ḱ, *ǵ, and *ǵʰ are depalatalized when preceding *r unless that *r is followed by an *i. The law is named after the German linguist Oskar Weise who observed the results of the change in an 1881 essay on the topic.

== Albanian ==
A map of the Albanian dialects

Rosenthall's law
Within a morpheme, only one nasal–stop cluster is allowed; if more than one cluster exists per morpheme in the underlying representation, any of these clusters created by morphophonological processes, such as epenthesis, are deleted. Examples are found in the terms kuvend ('assembly') and mbrëmë ('last night'), where the respective expected epenthetic forms *nguvend and *mbrëmbë reduced following this process. The process has been likened to Lyman's law in Japanese and Grassmann's law in Ancient Greek and Sanskrit. The law is named for the Canadian linguist Samuel Rosenthall who first proposed the process in 2022.

== Anatolian ==
Čop's law
(Luwic) When a Proto-Anatolian syllable contains a short and stressed vowel and followed by a consonant, the accented vowel becomes a and the following consonant geminates. Examples of the process include Cuneiform Luwian mallit- ('honey') from Proto-Indo-European *mélit- and maddu- ('wine') from *médʰu- ('honey, honey wine'). Earlier formations of the law only applied to *e in word-initial stressed syllables, but evidence suggests the law was operative with all accented short vowels. The broader formulation of the law explains why Proto-Anatolian *hóron- becomes Cuneiform Luwian ḫarran(i)- ('eagle'). The Dutch linguist Alwin Kloekhorst considers it a uniquely Luwic innovation based on the historical lenition rules found in Proto-Anatolian. A limited form of the law was thought to apply to all Anatolian languages, but examples are few and may be explainable through other processes. The law is named for the Slovenian linguist Bojan Čop who published work on the process in 1970, though the original formulation was much broader and only applied to Luwian.
Oettinger's law
(Hittite) In disyllabic words, short vowels in open primary syllables lengthen if the following syllable is light. Examples include ḫāši (singular form of 'to open') against ḫăššanzi (plural form). The law is named after the German linguist Norbert Oettinger, who described the process in 1979. It was first named by the Dutch linguist Robert S. P. Beekes in 1987.
Sturtevant's law
(Hittite) At some point after Proto-Anatolian, but before the first attestation of Hittite, voiceless stops developed into geminates in word-medial position and voiced stops devoiced. Examples of the process include 𒄿𒌑𒃷 (yukan, 'yoke') from Proto-Indo-European *yugóm, contrasted with 𒊭𒀝𒋼𒀀 (šakkar; 'dung, excrement') from Proto-Indo-European *sóḱr̥. The law is named for the American linguist Edgar Sturtevant, who first formulated the law in 1932, though he credited "the inspiration for [the] observation" to his student C. L. Mudge.

== Armenian ==
Adjarian's law
Also, Acharian's law. In some Armenian dialects, the vowels in an initial syllable are fronted after Proto-Indo-European voiced aspirated stops. The process appears to have been mediated by the advancement of the tongue root, evidenced by some dialects in Malatya among others. The law is named after the Armenian linguist Hrachia Acharian, who first described the process in 1901. Acharian dated the law to sometime between the 7th and 11th centuries since the loanwords from Arabic underwent the process, but those from Turkish did not.
Meillet's law
Also, Great Armenian Puzzle. The Proto-Indo-European cluster *dw becomes Classical Armenian -րկ- (-rk-). In initial position, ե- (e-) is later epenthesized to the front. Examples include երկու (erku, 'two') from Proto-Indo-European *dwō. The law is named after the French linguist Antoine Meillet who first identified the process in 1894.

== Balto-Slavic ==
de Saussure's law
Also, Saussure's law; Fortunatov–de Saussure's law; Fortunatov's law; law of Saussure/Fortunatov. If a word's stress is on a syllable without a falling tone, the stress moves to the closest following syllable with an acute vowel. The law is named after the Swiss linguist Ferdinand de Saussure who built on previous works on the subject by Filipp Fortunatov and Adalbert Bezzenberger in 1894 and 1896. Fortunatov, however, independently applied the process to Slavic stress. The process was preceded by Pedersen's law. It is unclear when the process occurred; it appears not to have affected Latvian at all. Slavicists such as Edward Stankiewicz, George Shevelov, and André Vaillant believe the law affected Slavic, whereas Balticists and Balto-Slavicists like Frederik Kortlandt, Christian Stang, and Vladimir Dybo restrict the law to Baltic and perhaps only Lithuanian.
Ebeling's law
In disyllabic verbs, if the syllable-final vowel is short or has a circumflexed tone, the stress is moved from that final syllable to the first syllable. The process appears to have been resistant to homophony, however. The law is named for the Dutch linguist Carl Ebeling who first postulated the process in 1963, with a revised form in 1967; it was later revised further by Frederik Kortlandt in 1977. There is some debate as to whether this is a Balto-Slavic development or a Slavic element alone; Collinge leans towards Slavic only, Kortlandt argues for Balto-Slavic, and Trask remains language agnostic. In either case, the process occurred shortly after the application of Hirt's law and before the application of Dybo's law.
Lidén's law
Word-initial *w in Proto-Indo-European is lost before non-syllabic *r and *l as the language developed into Proto-Balto-Slavic. The law is named for the Swedish linguist Evald Lidén, who wrote about the process in 1899. The process described by the law likely occurred after the development of Hirt's law, but before the syllabification of resonants. While it is possible that the law occurred after the syllabification of resonants and only affected non-syllabic resonants, Ranko Matasović finds this "improbable on phonetic grounds".
Hirt's law
Also, Hirt–Illich-Svitych's law. If the syllable preceding the expected stressed syllable has a vowel immediately followed by a laryngeal, the stress is retracted to that syllable. Examples include comparisons of Lithuanian výras ('man, husband') and mótė ('mother') with Sanskrit वीरः (vīráḥ; 'man, hero') and माता (mātā́, 'mother'), respectively. The law was first proposed by the German philologist Hermann Hirt in 1895, but the original formulation was corrected in 1963 by the Soviet linguist Vladislav Illich-Svitych. The process applied prior the elimination of zero-grade stems and before laryngeal consonants underwent their merger; Ebeling demonstrated in 1967 that it must have occurred after the language underwent oxytonesis. It occurred shortly before the application of Ebeling's law.
Pedersen's law
In words with a mobile accent paradigm of three syllables or longer, the accent was retracted from a medial onto the initial syllable. Examples include Lithuanian piemuõ ('shepherd') in the nominative, but píemenį in the accusative. A falling tone is always found on the affected syllable when the law is not invoked. The law is named after the Danish linguist Holger Pedersen, who first proposed it in 1933. The process occurred very early in the Balto-Slavic period; Frederik Kortlandt considers Pedersen's law to be the oldest law of retraction and possibly the earliest law of accent in the language. However, the process later reappeared in both the Slavic and Baltic languages. In Lithuanian, for example, it appears to have reappeared sometime after the lengthening of stressed e and a, but before the application of de Saussure's law. In Slavic, it occurred after the application of Ebeling's law.
Winter's law
Short vowels with non-acute accents are lengthened before unaspirated voiced stops (*b, *d, *g, but not *ǵ). The newly lengthened vowel receives the acute accent. The law is named after the German linguist Werner Winter who wrote his proposal in 1976, though it was not published until 1978. Frederik Kortlandt has dated the law to the final years of the Balto-Slavic period. Under the glottalic theory of Proto-Indo-European phonology, the term Winter–Kortlandt's law is sometimes used, which adds that *b, operating as an ejective consonant, "decomposed" into a pre-laryngealized non-ejective stop, which led to the deletion of the laryngeal and, consequently, compensatory lengthening to the preceding vowel.

=== Baltic ===
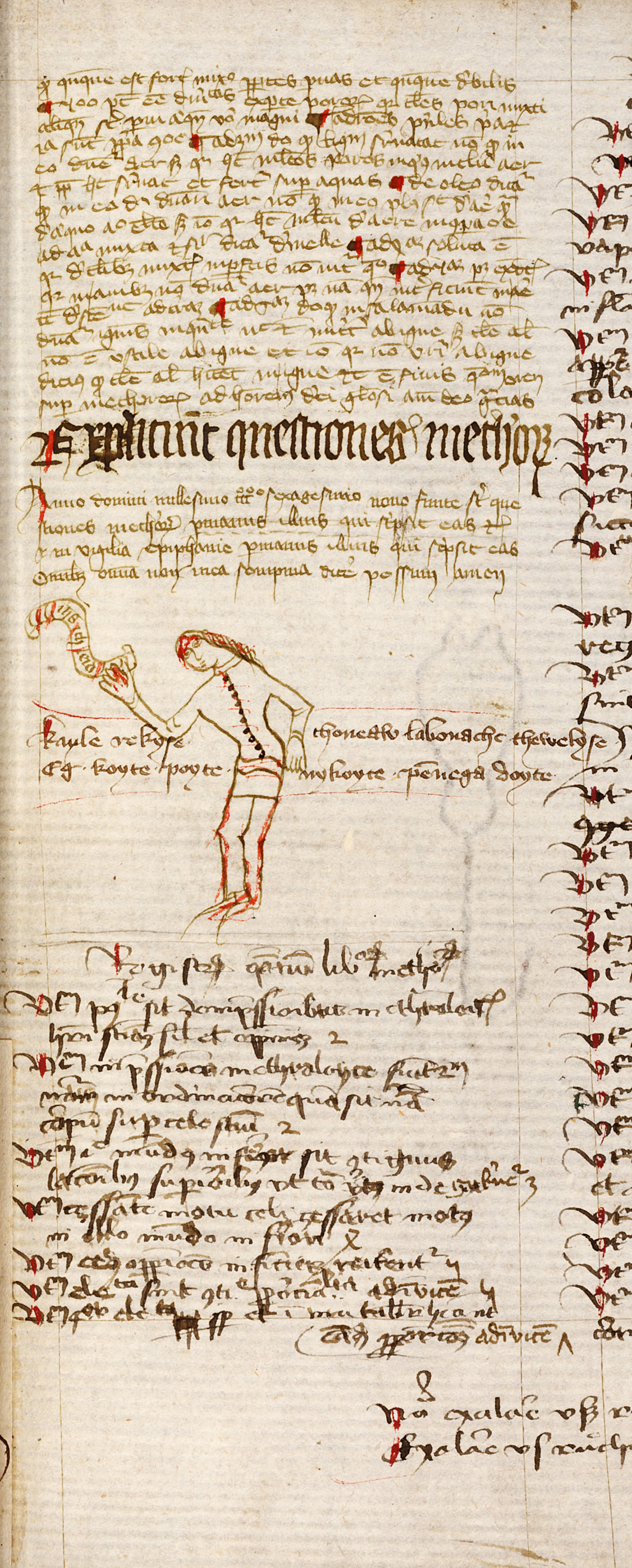
The Old Prussian–language Basel Epigram is thought to be the oldest surviving work in any Baltic language.

Endzelīns's law
Also, Endzelin's law. The Proto-Indo-European diphthongs *ei, *ai, and *oi become *ẹ̄́ before undergoing diphthongization to *íe in the Baltic languages. Examples of the process include Lithuanian diẽvas and Latvian dìevs, both meaning 'God' and both from Proto-Indo-European *deíwos. The Swedish linguist Tore Torbiörnsson has dated the law to sometime before de Saussure's law, though it is possible the law is constrained to Latvian and Lithuanian rather than all of the Baltic languages. The law is named for the Latvian linguist Jānis Endzelīns, also known by his Russian name Ivan Martynovich Endzelin, (Note: Russian: Иван Мартынович Эндзелин) who proposed the concept in 1907, though only including Proto-Indo-European *ei and defended it repeatedly for over forty years. However, the German philologist Hermann Hirt articulated a similar concept in 1892 following an earlier publication by Karl Brugmann. Endzelīns's work gained more traction after a 1948 piece was translated into English in 1971.
Hjelmslev's law
(Lithuanian) When a vowel receives an accent, it takes on the intonation of the following syllable. The law is named for the Danish linguist Louis Hjelmslev, who proposed the process in his doctoral thesis in 1932. Kortlandt states that, if the ictus retracts to a laryngealized vowel, the laryngeal is deleted and the result is a rising tone, but N. E. Collinge argues this is beyond the scope of process and that both Hjelmslev and de Saussure allow for a falling tone in their analyses.
Kortlandt's law
(Old Prussian) When a short vowel is stressed, the stress moves to the following syllable. It is unclear if the syllable needs to be open or not. The law did not allow for stress movement to occur with diphthongs and occurred regardless of the accentual paradigm of the word. The process has been compared to Dybo's law. The law is named for the Dutch linguist Frederik Kortlandt, who first proposed the concept in 1974.
Leskien's law
(Lithuanian) If a word-final long vowel contains a falling accent, it is shortened. This process precedes Hjemslev's law, but is preceded by de Saussure's and Nieminen's laws. The law is named for the German linguist August Leskien, who first established the law in 1881.
Nieminen's law
When the Proto-Baltic sequence *-ás is found word-finally, it is reduced to *-əs and loses its ability to carry stress. As a result, final stress is retracted to the penultimate syllable. This change explains the accentuation paradigm of o-stem nouns. Examples include báltas ('white') and var̃nas ('raven') from earlier *langás and *warnás, respectively. This is contrasted with mobile paradigms, where the accent is final, such as in galvà ('head') and žvėrìs ('beast'). The process also explains some plural stress changes, such as in Lithuanian diẽvas ('god'), with primary stress, and dievaĩ ('gods'), with final stress. The law is named after the Finnish linguist Eino Nieminen who proposed the law in 1922. The process certainly precedes Leskien's law in Lithuanian, but has been suggested to go at least as far back as Proto-Baltic based on evidence from Old Prussian.

=== Slavic ===
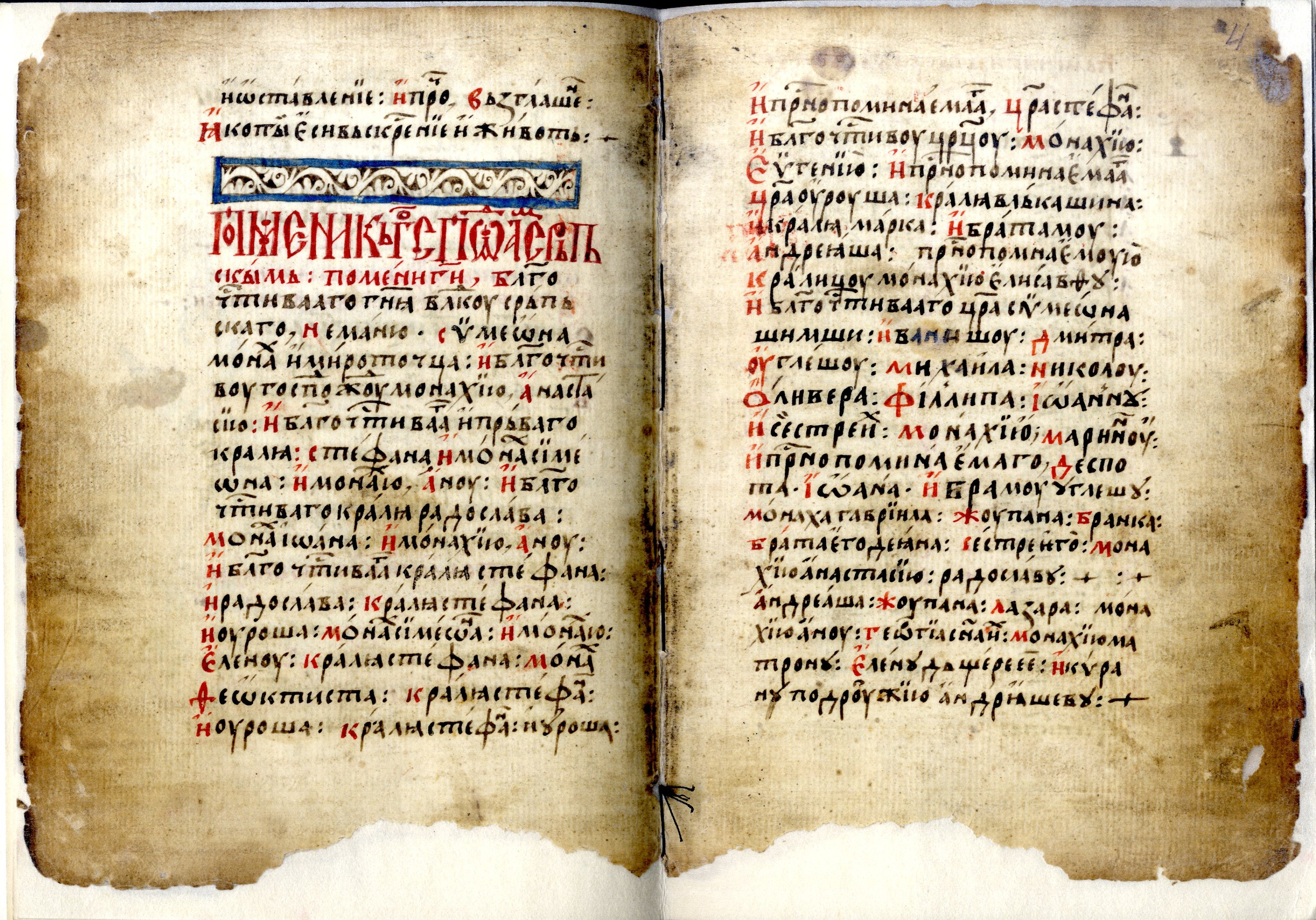
A 14th-century manuscript of the canonical Gospels from the Monastery of St. Jovan Bigorski written in Old Church Slavonic, a liturgical Slavic language used in Eastern Christianity

Dolobko's law
Also, Vasilyev–Dolobko's law. In a word with mobile stress and a final encliticized morpheme, the stress moves from the initial syllable to the final syllable. If the encliticized morpheme has no syllable, the stress moves to the preceding syllable. This process occurred sometime between the end of the Balto-Slavic period and the loss of intervocalic *j, which places it sometime before Dybo's law. The law is named after the Soviet linguist Mily Dolobko who wrote about the process in 1927. Because its first formulation was by Leonid Vasilyev, another Soviet linguist, in 1905, it is sometimes known by the joint name.
Dybo's law
Also, Dybo–Illich-Svitych's law; Illich-Svitych's law. If a neoacute syllable was accented, the accent shifted to the following syllable. The process was blocked if the accent was underlyingly mobile. Examples include *blъxy ('fleas'), with stress on the second syllable, as compared with Lithuanian blùsos and Greek ψῠ́λλαι (psýllai), where stress falls on the first. Though it always shifts right, the resulting accent differed based on the conditions of the following syllable. For example, the underlying form **dòbrota became *dobròta ('goodness'), while **žènica became *ženı̋ca (diminutive of 'wife'). The process has been dated to around the turn of the 9th century and followed shortly by Stang's law of Slavic; it precedes Ivšić's law, but is preceded by Van Wijk's law. The law is named for the Russian linguist Vladimir Dybo and the Soviet linguist Vladislav Illich-Svitych, who first discovered the process. Dybo published an article on the topic in 1962, followed by another in 1963 which was co-authored with Illich-Svitych and another the same year by Illich-Svitych alone.
fall of the weak yers
Following the results of Havlík's law, weak yers were deleted. Examples are found in Old East Slavic, where earlier forms for the word 'prince' demonstrate a retained yer (кънѧзь [kъnjazь]), but later forms show it without (кнѧзь [knjazь]); the retained forms are dated to around 1075, while loss became widespread between the 1120s and 1210s.
first Slavic vowel shift
The long vowel *ū shifted to *ȳ and all diphthongs smoothed into long monophthongs. This process has been dated to around the 4th or 5th centuries.
Fortunatov's law
(Controversial) In short falling non-final syllables, stress moves to the following syllable if the following syllable has a rising accent. Some exceptions are well known, such as in Russian гото́ва (gotóva) but Serbo-Croatian gòtova, or in the historical dual Serbo-Croatian ȍba but Russian о́ба (óba). Despite this, the law saw a substantive defense in 1964 by George Shevelov, though it remains controversial. The law is named for the Russian linguist Filipp Fortunatov, who first proposed it in 1880.
Georgiev's law
When word-initial short vowels are stressed, they are lengthened, provided they were originally in closed syllables. Examples include Proto-Balto-Slavic *ắkmō(n) becoming Proto-Slavic *kā̋my ('stone'). The law is named for the Bulgarian linguist Vladimir I. Georgiev, who first proposed it in 1965.
Hartmann's law
(Not fully solved) This three-pronged process governs the application of intonation in Slavic derivations. In class I, if the acute falls on the noun stem, the adjective derivation retains stress on the stem. Examples of this include the Ukrainian noun горо́х (horókh, 'peas') and its relational adjective горо́ховий (horókhovyj). In class II, if the stem has undergone an oxytonizing process and stress does not fall on the stem, stress falls on the derivational suffix. Examples of this include the Russian noun бобё́р (bobjór, 'beaver') with its relational adjective бобро́вый (bobróvyj). In class III, if the stem is not stressed and has not undergone any oxytonizing process, the stress falls on the inflectional suffix. Examples of this include го́род (górod; 'town, city') with its relational adjective городово́й (gorodovój; 'urban, municipal'). The law is named after the linguist Hans Hartmann who established the process in a 1936 work.
Havlík's law
In late Proto-Slavic, the vowels represented by *ь and *ъ, called yers, become "weak" – that is, subject to moraic shortening – in final position or if they are followed by a vowel other than another yer. A yer becomes "strong" if the following syllable contained a weak yer. In words with three successive syllables all containing yers, the final yer was weak, causing the penultimate syllable to be strong and the antepenultimate weak. This process represents the first phase of the larger yer shift; the second phase is known as the fall of the weak yers, where weak yers were deleted. Still, the term "Havlík's law" is sometimes applied to the yer shift as a whole. The law is named after the Czech linguist Antonín Havlík who first described the outcomes of the process in Old Czech in 1889.
Ivšić's law
(Not fully accepted) Also, Ivšić's rule; Stang's law; Stang–Ivšić's law. In circumflex syllables with long vowels, the ictus moves to the preceding vowel and creating the neo-acute accent. The process occurs before Dybo's law. Though widely accepted by modern linguists, several exceptions remain unexplained. Those who subscribe to the Moscow accentological school initially accepted the law, but have become unconvinced that the law is valid. Because Dybo's law is preceded by Stang's law and usually neutralizes the former's effects, they argue parsimoniously that the accents simply never shift in these instances. Kortlandt, a member of the Leiden accentological school, argues that the Moscow school misinterprets the conditions under which the law is triggered. The law is named for the Norwegian linguist Christian Stang, who built upon the Croatian linguist Stjepan Ivšić's 1911 work on accentual retraction in 1957.
Ivšić's retraction
Also, Ivšić's law. In Kajkavian, Carinthian Slovene, and Pannonian Slovene, neoacute accents retract to the preceding long vowel. Examples of this process include *zābȃva ('party') becoming zãbava. In the Kajkavian dialect spoken in Turopolje, Croatia, neoacute accents retract to the preceding regardless of vowel length, such as in nȅ pušim ('I don't smoke'), as opposed to ne pȗšim elsewhere. (Note: Note that the negative particle ne is in liaison with the verb it affects.) The law is named for the Croatian linguist Stjepan Ivšić, who first articulated the concept in 1937.
law of open syllables
Also, opening of syllables; tendency to rising sonority; law of rising sonority. Word- and syllable-final obstruents and obstruent clusters are deleted. Final nasals are lost after short vowels and nasalized after long vowels. Though often treated as one process, the law is an oft-cited case of diachronic conspiracy, where several unrelated sound changes combine into a specific outcome not created by any other individually.
law of syllabic synharmony
Also, law of syllabic synharmonism; syllable synharmony. In Early Common Slavic, consonants are dragged forward to the palate or otherwise become coronal before front vowels, and back vowels move forward when following palatal consonants. The shift gives the sounds a synharmonic timbre, leading to the traditional "soft" and "hard" consonant distinction in modern Slavic languages. The process was blocked by the merger of *ɛː and *aː after palatal consonants.
Meillet's law
In words with a mobile accent paradigm, if the first syllable is accented with a rising (acute) accent in Proto-Balto-Slavic, it is converted into a falling (circumflex) accent in Proto-Slavic. Examples of this include Serbo-Croatian gláva in the nominative case, but glȃvu in the accusative. The process appears to be somewhat resistant to analogical leveling. The law is named after the French linguist Antoine Meillet who first described the law in 1902.
second Slavic vowel shift
Also, qualitative differentiation. Length distinctions between vowels became distinctions in vowel quality. The short vowels *i, *y, *e, and *a became *ь, *ъ, *e, and *o, respectively. The long vowels *ī, *ȳ, *ō, *ē, and *ā became *i, *y, *u, *ě, and *a, respectively. Nasal long vowels simply shortened. This process has been dated to around the 8th and early 9th centuries.
Shakhmatov's law
(No longer widely accepted) Also, Šaxmatov's law. Stressed circumflex accents shift to the preceding syllable. The law is named after Aleksey Shakhmatov who described the process in 1915.
Slavic first palatalization
Also, first palatalization of velars; first regressive palatalization. When the velar sounds *k, *g, and *x occur before front vowels and *y, they undergo palatalization and become *č, *ž, and *š, respectively. If the velar follows a sibilant (i.e., *sk or *zg), the sibilant was backed to *šč and *ždž before the cluster was reduced in some dialects to *št and *žd. The process was probably mediated by coronalization before a final assibilation. The time at which the process occurred is unknown but it must have begun prior to the Migration Period and was completed sometime between the 6th and 8th centuries.
Slavic second palatalization
Also, second palatalization of velars; second regressive palatalization. Following the monophthongization of Proto-Slavic *ai to *ě in open syllables and *i in closed syllables, velars became palatalized again. The process had different outcomes based on dialect: *k typically became *c and *g became either *dz or simply *z, but *x became *š in West Slavic, *xʲ in Novgorodian, and *s elsewhere. The process is estimated to have happened around the same time the West Slavs were migrating north of Carpathia and the Novgorodians were migrating to what is now northwestern Russia. Like the first palatalization, the process occurred in several stages: palatal coarticulation, palatalization, and assibilation. It appears that Novgorodian only went through the first stage. Clusters that had originally contained *ku̯ underwent palatalization in South Slavic and some East Slavic unless it was preceded by *s, but West Slavic and Novgorodian did not experience this palatalization at all.
Slavic third palatalization
Also, progressive velar palatalization; palatalization of Baudouin de Courtenay. When Proto-Slavic *i, *ī, or *in precede a velar, the velar is palatalized and then assibilated; *k and *g become *c and *dz, respectively, in all languages, with *dz undergoing further lenition to *z outside of Eastern South Slavic, Slovak, and Lechitic. In West Slavic, *x became *š, but *s or *sʲ in South and East Slavic. Examples of this process include earlier *liːkad, meaning 'face', which became *liːca (whence Old Czech líce), and *mεːsinkaːd, the genitive singular form of 'moon', which became *mεːsĩːcaː (whence Old Polish miesięca). The first stage of this process was in effect by the 6th and 7th centuries.
van Wijk's law
When *j follows a consonant, it becomes *ь. In post-tonic syllables, the *ь assimilated to the following vowel, lengthening it. Whether the lengthening process is a part of the larger assimilatory process is the subject of some debate, though the lengthening as a separate result is sometimes termed "van Wijk's length". Although Aleksey Shakhmatov was the first to suggest the process in 1898, the law is named for the Dutch linguist Nicolaas van Wijk, who published work on the process in 1916.
yer shift
Also, jer shift; third Slavic vowel shift; fall of the yers. The yer vowels, *ь and *ъ, underwent two-part process followed by a third step that fractured the realization of the vowel qualities. First, yer vowels underwent an alternating pattern of weakening every other yer in a word beginning with weakening the final one; this first part of the shift is referred to as Havlík's law. The process is a patterned form of compensatory lengthening. Next, the weak yers were deleted, referred to as the fall of the weak yers. Following this deletion, the remaining strong yers were thereby shifted to different vowel qualities in the various Slavic languages, which collectively are known as the vocalization of the yers.

== Celtic ==
A traditional song sung in Irish, a Celtic language descended from Old Irish

Joseph's law
Between Proto-Indo-European and Proto-Celtic, when *e is followed by a resonant then by *a, the *e assimilates to *a. In other words, in the sequence *eRa, where *R signifies any resonant, *e becomes *a, thereby becoming *aRa. Examples of this change include Proto-Celtic *taratro- ('drill'), whence Irish tarathar ('auger') from earlier *teratro-, derived from Proto-Indo-European *terh₁tro-, whence Ancient Greek τέρετρον (téretron; 'borer, gimlet'). The law does not affect *ā and probably did not affect environments where the *a was word-final. The law also appears to have affected words where the *a was formerly a laryngeal consonant in Proto-Indo-European, such as in Proto-Celtic *banatlo- ('broom plant') which may be derived from Proto-Indo-European *bʰenH-tlo from a root meaning 'to hit, to strike'. The process was expanded in Welsh include environments where the resonant is followed by a nasal, explaining the vowel quality in Welsh words like sarnu 'to trample' but not Old Irish sernaid ('to arrange, to order'), both from a Proto-Celtic *sternū / *starnati paradigm (from an older subjunctive Proto-Indo-European form *ster-nh₂-o, cognate with Latin sternō). Similarly, another expansion of the process appears in both Brittonic and Gaulish, causing the assimilation of *o to *a in the resonant–vowel environment *oRa, thereby rendering *aRa. Compare Middle Welsh taran ('thunder') and Gaulish Taranis ('the Celtic god of thunder'), which were affected by the expanded law, with Old Irish torann ('thunder'), which was not. The law is named after Lionel Joseph who covered the topic in 1982.
MacNeill's law
(Old Irish) Also, MacNeill–O'Brien's law. In syllables beginning with a sonorant or *β and which have a short or syncopated vowel, the lenition of Old Irish n, r, and l is lost in final unstressed syllables even when they are etymologically expected to be lenited in that position. The law is named after the Irish nationalist politician and language revivalist Eoin MacNeill who first articulated the concept in a 1909 publication. The alternative name is derived from additions made by Micheal A. O'Brien in 1956.
McCone's law
1. (Old Irish) Proto-Celtic *b and *u̯ become *β before *n word-internally. The latter change is rare, but occurs in words like Old Irish amnair ('maternal uncle') from Proto-Celtic *au̯n and omun ('fear') from *ɸoβnos. The law appears to have only occurred in contexts where there is no front vowel preceding the cluster, which accounts for apparent counterexamples like Welsh clun ('hip, haunch') from Proto-Indo-European *ḱlownis and Old Irish búan ('permanent') from *bʰewHnos, though some other etymologies account for different sources; the Welsh term may be a later borrowing from Latin clūnis, for example. The law shares a relationship to another Proto-Celtic sound change where *ɸ became *u̯ between either *a or *o and *n. The law is named after the British linguist Kim McCone.
2. (Old Irish) Unless the syllable is stressed, voiceless obstruents are voiced word-initially and word-finally.

== Germanic ==
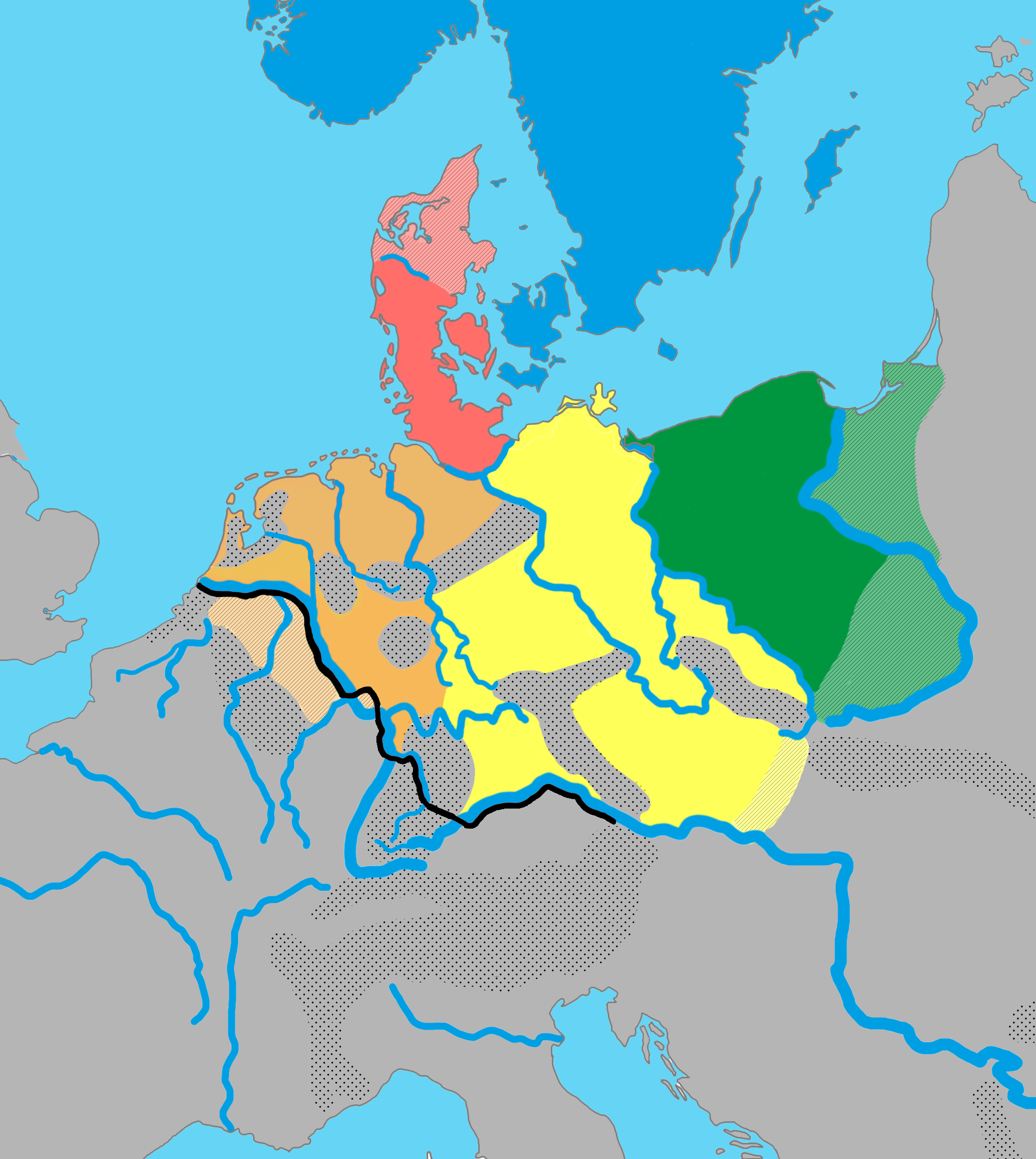
A map of Germanic languages at the beginning of the 1st century AD North Germanic North Sea Germanic, or Ingvaeonic Weser–Rhine Germanic, or Istvaeonic Elbe Germanic, or Irminonic East Germanic †

Anglo-Frisian brightening
(Anglic, Frisian) (Note: While English and the Frisian languages were seen historically as each other's closest relatives, "Anglo-Frisian" as a distinct phylogenetic category is no longer widely accepted. See Old Frisian § Relationship with English for further discussion.) Also, first fronting. In stressed syllables, *a shifts to *æ unless the consonant is followed by a nasal consonant. Examples include Old English dæg ('day') against Old High German tag and Old Icelandic dagr. The *æ tended to shift back to *a before *w, as in Old English gesawen, or in open syllables when the following vowel is *a, *o, or *u, as in Old English dagas ('days'). These exceptions are called the restoration of a. In the West Saxon dialect, the process sometimes applies to *ā, though it is much less regular. Examples include mǣg ('kinsman') and māgas ('kinsmen'). A few counterexamples exist in West Saxon as well, such as staþelian ('to establish'), though these may be explainable through analyzing the process as underlyingly being followed by a back vowel historically; thus staþelian can be analyzed as underlyingly *staþulōjan, with a following *u after a stressed *a. This, however, is not universally accepted.
Bugge's rule
1. (Controversial) Voiceless word-initial stops in Proto-Indo-European become voiced fricatives, whenever the accent falls three or more syllables from the onset. The process helps to explain one major set of exceptions to Verner's law. The rule is named for Sophus Bugge who first postulated the concept in 1887.
2. (Old Norse) In ljóðaháttr verse, if an even-numbered line ends in a trochee, the heavy syllable is made light; in other words, in strong–weak metrical feet, heavy strong syllables are prohibited at the end of a verse. Examples include the fourth-line dómr um dauðan hvern ('reputation for each dead person') rather than *dómr um dauðan hverjan. In instances such as hvat skal hans tryggðum trúa? ('how should one trust in his trustworthiness?'), the typically-long primary syllable is short, even though the orthography implies a heavy syllable. The process is dated to somewhere before the turn of the 10th century and can help to date certain texts. However, in some later Icelandic texts, the form changed somewhat to prohibit long primary syllables when the final word in a verse is disyllabic, which has obfuscated some dating efforts. The rule is also named after Sophus Bugge who first articulated the idea in 1879.
Cowgill's law
(Not fully accepted) Also, laryngeal hardening. Following the application of Grimm's law, when the laryngeal consonant *h₃ is preceded by a sonorant and followed by *w, it becomes *k. Purported examples of this process include Proto-Indo-European *gʷih₃wós ('alive') becoming Proto-Germanic *kwikwaz. It may also have affected *h₂, as in *taikuraz from Proto-Indo-European *dayh₂wḗr ('brother-in-law'), as compared with Sanskrit देवा (devā́) and Greek δᾱήρ (dāḗr). The law has been the subject of heated debate; Don Ringe, however, describes objections to the law as somewhat incoherent. Dating the law has proven somewhat difficult; Ringe suggests that if the law affects *h₂, it probably preceded Grimm's law and the epenthesis of *ə between nonsyllabic consonants and laryngeals. If true, it likely became *g before being devoiced to *k by Grimm's law. Irrespective of whether the law affected *h₂, it certainly preceded the merger of labiovelars and clusters of a velar consonant followed by *w. The law is named for the American linguist Warren Cowgill who formulated what is considered its strongest defense over several decades, though it was first proposed by William Austin, another American linguist, in 1946.
Germanic spirant law
Also, Primärberührung; Primärberührungseffekt. (Note: lit. 'primary contact' and 'primary contact effect', respectively) When a Proto-Indo-European plosive is followed by *s or *t, it becomes a voiceless fricative. The law was late enough to apply to Latin loans in the Germanic languages, examples of which include German Schrift from Latin scriptum.
Grimm's law
Also, first Germanic sound shift; first Germanic consonant shift; Rask's rule. The three series of Proto-Indo-European plosives undergo a chain shift. The first shift causes voiceless stops – *p, *t, *k, and *kʷ – to become the voiceless fricatives *f, *θ, *x, and *xʷ, respectively. (Note: Different authors prefer different symbols to represent the Proto-Germanic fricative sounds produced by Grimm's law. Collinge (1985) prefers the symbol *þ – derived from the rune thorn, used in the alphabets of some Germanic languages to represent dental fricatives – in lieu of *θ, but the sound both symbols represent are equivalent. Stiles (2018) uses thorn as well, but replaces *x and *xʷ with *χ and *χʷ. This glossary follows the convention used by Trask (2000).) Next, the plain voiced stops – *b, *d, *g, and *gʷ – devoice and become *p, *t, *k, and *kʷ, respectively. Lastly, the aspirated voiced stops – *bʰ, *dʰ, *gʰ, and *gʷʰ – become plain voiced stops *b, *d, *g, and *gʷ, respectively. This sound change is sometimes obfuscated in Old High German as a result of the High German consonant shift. The process did not affect the second consonant in a cluster of two adjacent obstruents. Compare two versions of the Old Frisian word for 'throat': strot- and throt-. Both are derived from the Proto-Indo-European s-mobile root *(s)trewd-, the former including the s-mobile while the latter does not. In this example, the form with the s-mobile blocks the aspiration of the *t. Several other exceptions are covered by Verner's law. The Danish linguist Rasmus Rask is credited with first articulating the law in 1818, but its more common name is from German folklorist Jacob Grimm, who – after reading Rask's work – expanded on it and published it in the preface of his German grammar book in 1819 with a rewrite in 1822.
Hesselman's law
(North Germanic) Vowel lengthening processes occur in monosyllabic words before they occur in disyllabic ones. It is possible the law also occurs in Alemannic and Bavarian German. The law was named after the Swedish linguist Bengt Hesselman – based on his work in 1901 and 1902 – by Tomas Riad, another Swedish linguist.
High German consonant shift
(High German languages) Also, second Germanic consonant shift; second consonant shift; Grimm's second sound shift; second sound shift. The Proto-Germanic stops *p, *t, and *k become the affricates [p͡f], [t͡s], and [k͡x]. In some contexts, the affricate may form a simple fricative, as in German helfen ('to help') not *helpfen. In other contexts, the affricates further devolve into the geminate fricatives [ff], [ss], and [xx], as in German essen ('to eat') not *etsen. The Dutch linguist Peter Schrijver suggests that the process occurred as a result of language contact with the Gallo-Romance languages. He dates the change to the Early Middle Ages. The American linguists Gregory K. Iverson and Joe Salmons suggest specifically around the turn of the 8th century.
Holtzmann's law
(North and East Germanic) Also, Verschärfung; sharpening; intensification. The geminated glides *jj and *ww are hardened into geminate plosives. In North Germanic, *jj becomes *ggj, but it becomes *ddj in East Germanic. The geminate *ww becomes *ggw in both, though it did not affect Vandalic, an East Germanic language; compare Gothic 𐍄𐍂𐌹𐌲𐌲𐍅𐍃 (triggws; 'true, faithful') with Vandalic triova, both from the Proto-Germanic root *trewwō-. The law is named for the German linguist Adolf Holtzmann who articulated the concept in 1835.
Ingvaeonic nasal spirant law
(Ingvaeonic) When *n is followed by a fricative, the *n is lost and the preceding vowel is lengthened to compensate. The vowel was probably nasalized first and then experienced a loss in nasal quality before lengthening.
Kluge's law
(Controversial) Following Grimm's law, if a stop consonant abuts *n, the *n devoices and assimilates, creating a geminate stop. For example, the earlier clusters *-pn-, *-bn-, and *-bʰn- all become *-pp-. Donald Ringe writes that "the problem with Kluge's suggestion is simply that the etymologies are unconvincing". Another issue is that Gothic appears to be unaffected by the process, as in 𐌰𐌿𐌷𐌽𐍃 (aúhns, 'oven'), suggesting that it may not be a Proto-Germanic innovation. Frederik Kortlandt, however, supports the law, estimating that it can be dated to between Grimm's and Verner's laws, though he places Verner's law before Grimm's. The American philologist Robert D. Fulk does not dismiss this view, but suggests that it requires a reworking of Proto-Germanic consonant reconstructions. Don Ringe and Ann Taylor refute this reordering of the laws. The law is named for the German philologist Friedrich Kluge who suggested the concept in 1884.
Lorentz's law
(Gothic) In word-final syllables, Proto-Germanic long vowels remain long, irrespective of moraic quantity, if the syllable-final consonant is a sibilant, *h, or *r. Examples of this include the collapse of Proto-Germanic *gibōz (nominative case of 'gifts'), with a bimoraic long vowel, and *gibôz (accusative case of 'gifts'), with a trimoraic overlong vowel, into the united Gothic term 𐌲𐌹𐌱𐍉𐍃 (gibōs), which served as both the nominative and accusative form of 'gifts'. The law is named after the German linguist Friedrich Lorenz who articulated the law in 1895, but for all Germanic languages and only in contexts with word-final sibilants. Patrick Stiles notes, however, that other linguists presented similar views before him. The innovation for expanding the law to include *h and *r is credited to the German linguist Franz Bopp. The law was first named by Stiles in 1988.
Thurneysen's law
(Not fully solved, Gothic) Spirants in unaccented syllables changed their voiced–unvoiced quality based on the quality of the preceding consonant, whereby voiced spirants appear after unvoiced consonants and voiceless spirants appear after voiced consonants. Examples of both can be found in the dative singular forms, 𐌰𐌲𐌹𐍃𐌰 (agisa, 'fear') and 𐍂𐌹𐌵𐌹𐌶𐌰 (riqiza, 'darkness'). (Note: The nominative singular forms are 𐌰𐌲𐌹𐍃 (agis) and 𐍂𐌹𐌵𐌹𐍃 (riqis), respectively.) In short, spirants are voiced when they are immediately preceded by a vowel without primary stress and the preceding consonant before the vowel is unvoiced. If the preceding consonant is a cluster where the second consonant is a liquid, the spirant remains unvoiced, but if the second consonant is a glide, it is voiced. The process does not affect word-final spirants and the second element in a compound word where the simplex bears stress. While some exceptions occur due to morphological leveling, there are at least seven words for which Thurneysen could not supply an explanation. The law is named after the Swiss linguist Rudolf Thurneysen who posited the law in 1896 and published it in 1898.
Verner's law
Traditionally viewed as occurring after the application of Grimm's law, when a voiceless fricative is preceded by an unaccented syllable and is not word-initial or abutting another voiceless consonant, it is voiced. Examples of this process include Proto-Germanic *ubilaz ('evil, bad') from Proto-Indo-European *h₂upélos with the intermediate form *ufélos. Following this, the mobile Proto-Indo-European accent was lost and stress fell on the first syllable by default. The process occurred before the loss of *gʷ from Proto-Germanic's phonemic inventory, though its chronological relation to vowel contraction in hiatus is unclear. Some linguists, such as Robert D. Fulk and Frederik Kortlandt, have suggested that Verner's law may actually precede Grimm's law, mediated by Kluge's law occurring between them. Don Ringe and Ann Taylor refute this reordering of the laws. The law is named after the Danish linguist Karl Verner who described the process in 1876.
von Bahder's law
(High German, Low German, and Dutch) Proto-Germanic *b (Note: Strictly speaking, the Proto-Germanic *ƀ, a fricativized allophone found between two vowels or between vowel and a resonant, undergoes the process.) becomes *f before *l or *r, typically in suffixes. Examples of this include Old High German scūfla ('shovel') as contrasted with the alternative form scūvala, without the l abutting the b. However, some vowel insertions have caused some alternations to appear, such as in Old High German sweval and swebal for 'sulfur', while Gothic only has * 𐍃𐍅𐌹𐌱𐌻𐍃 (*swibls). (Note: While * 𐍃𐍅𐌹𐌱𐌻𐍃 (*swibls) is unattested, a related form is attested and the nominative singular is deduced from it.) In Dutch, the devoicing applies to all consonants preceding l, r, m, and n when those consonants are followed by a vowel. The vowel insertion also creates voicing alternations, as in Standard Dutch bezem ('broom') and dialectal bessem. Additionally, the process appears to explain some excepted outcomes of Verner's law. The law is named after the German philologist Karl von Bahder who first described the process in 1903, though he only applied it to High German.
West Germanic gemination
All consonants except *r geminate when following a short vowel and preceding a *j. Examples include Proto-Germanic *skapjaną ('to create') becoming Old English scieppan and Old Saxon skeppian, but Gothic 𐍃𐌺𐌰𐍀𐌾𐌰𐌽 (skapjan) and Old Norse skepja. The process also occurs before *r or *l. Examples include Proto-Germanic *akraz ('field') becoming Old High German ackar and Old Saxon akkar, but Gothic 𐌰𐌺𐍂𐍃 (akrs), and Proto-Germanic *aplaz ('apple') becoming Old English æppel and Old Saxon appel, but Old Norse epli.

== Hellenic ==
A map of Ancient Greek dialects

Bartoli's law
Also, Bàrtoli's law. When a word ends in short–long metrical feet where oxytone stress is expected, the word becomes paroxytone before a word boundary. The law only occurs in anapestic (short–short–long) and cretic (long–short–long) contexts. An example of this process can be seen in Ancient Greek θυγάτηρ (thygátēr, 'daughter'), in its nominative singular form, when contrasted with its accusative singular form θυγατέρα (thygatéra) and with the Sanskrit nominative singular दुहिता (duhitā́, 'daughter'). While some exceptions can be attributed to analogical change, there are still some unexplained exceptions. The law is named after the Istriot linguist Matteo Bartoli, whose 1930 publication contrasted Sanskrit oxytone words with their Ancient Greek paroxytone cognates.
Cowgill's law
Whenever Proto-Indo-European *o occurs between a resonant and a labial, it becomes Greek υ (y). The resonant and the labial can be on either side of the *o and produce the same output. Examples of a resonant followed by *o followed by a labial include νύξ (nýx, 'night') from *nokʷt-, whence also Latin nox ('night'). This law is preceded by laryngeal coloring, meaning that Proto-Indo-European sequences of *h₁o, *h₃o, and *h₃e are also accounted for in the law, as are cases in which the zero-grade form was vocalized, such as in στόρνυμεν (stórnymen, 'we smooth out') from Proto-Indo-European *str̥-n-h̥₃-, showing the nasal infix. Some later sound changes obfuscate the law, but there is evidence to show that the sound change still occurred. For example, Proto-Indo-European *nomn̥ ('name') gave way to Proto-Greek *onuma. Although in Attic Greek the form became ὄνομα (ónoma), the expected form ὄνυμα (ónyma) is found in both Doric and Aeolic Greek; the expected form is also found in derivatives such as ἀνώνυμος (anṓnymos; 'nameless, inglorious').
Hirt's law
(Controversial) In trisyllabic words expected to have penultimate stress, the stress is retracted to the first syllable. Examples include ἔλυτρον (élytron; 'cover, sheath') against Sanskrit वरुत्र (varútra; 'cloak, mantle') from Proto-Indo-European *welútrom. The law is named after the German philologist Hermann Hirt, who first described the process in 1895. Though Hirt defended the law several times throughout his life, the legitimacy of the law remains questionable.
law of limitation
Also, limitation law. Stress cannot appear any earlier in a word than the antepenultimate syllable. If the final syllable is heavy, it cannot appear any earlier than the penultimate, but syllable-final consonants do not contribute to syllable weight. The law is attested in every known Greek dialect, with the possible exception of Thessalian subdialect of Aeolic Greek. Some exceptions exist in Attic and Ionic Greek as a result of quantitative metathesis, which disrupted the original formulation. The process probably predates Homeric Greek, though it is certainly constrained to Greek and not a larger Indo-European process.
Miller's law
(Not fully accepted) Also, Miller's rule. Immediately following an accented syllable, Proto-Greek aspirated consonants are deaspirated immediately following a nasal consonant. Examples of the process include Ancient Greek θρόμβος (thrómbos, 'clot'), from Proto-Indo-European *dʰrónbʰo-, against its related but non-nasalized counterpart τρέφω (tréphō; 'I thicken, I congeal'), from Proto-Indo-European *dʰrebʰo-. The accent condition supplies an explanation for the oft-cited counterexamples ὀμφαλός (omphalós, 'navel'), from Proto-Indo-European *h₃(e)nbʰ-l̥-(l)-ó-, and ἀμφί (amphí, 'around'), from *h₂entbʰí. Although many violations can be attributed to Pre-Greek loanwords, the Greek term γόμφος (gómphos; 'peg, bolt') has persisted as an unexplained form, against the expected form *γόμβος (*gómbos). One explanation derives it from Proto-Indo-European *ǵonh₂-bʰo- ('like a tooth'), provided that the law precedes the Saussure effect or some similar loss of laryngeals. The law is not fully accepted; it is notably absent from standard references of Greek historical linguistics and is resolutely rejected by Beekes throughout his Etymological Dictionary of Greek. (Note: Beekes does not acknowledge the role of accent and instead considers both θρόμβος and τρέφω Pre-Greek loanwords.) Despite this, it has gained considerable support in recent years. If true, the process is certainly preceded by Grassmann's law and the devoicing of Proto-Indo-European aspirated stops in Greek; one estimate places the law sometime between Proto-Indo-European and Proto-Greek. A similar process appears to have also taken place in Proto-Italic, explaining Latin ambi- ('both'). The law is named for D. Gary Miller who articulated a version of the process in a 1977 paper on Bartholomae's law, though the idea goes at least as far back as Eduard Schwyzer's 1959 Griechische Grammatik ('Greek Grammar').
Vendryes's law
(Attic) Also, Vendryès's law. Any perispomenon with a short vowel in the antepenultimate becomes proparoxytone. The law is named after the French linguist Joseph Vendryes.
Wheeler's law
Also, law of dactylic retraction. Oxytone words in Proto-Indo-European become paroxytone in Ancient Greek if the word has a dactylic ending; in other words, the stress in dactylic words moved from the final syllable to the penultimate syllable. The law counts endings such as ον (-on), ος (-os), and οι (-oi) as short. Examples of this tonic retraction include cognate pairs like ποικίλος (poikílos; 'variegated, complex'), with a paroxytone, and Vedic Sanskrit पेशलः (peśaláḥ), which retains the oxytone. The law is named after the American philologist Benjamin Ide Wheeler who first described it in 1885.

== Indo-Iranian ==
A student in Texas speaking Persian, an Indo-Iranian language

Brugmann's law
In open, non-final syllables, the vowel *o is lengthened and becomes *ā. In all other contexts, *o becomes short *a. Examples of the process include Indo-Iranian descendants of Proto-Indo-European *doru- ('wood'), such as Sanskrit दारु (dāru) and Avestan 𐬛𐬁𐬎𐬭𐬎 (dā^{u}ru), as contrasted with Ancient Greek δόρῠ (dórŭ). Masato Kobayashi has argued that the underlying sound change is *o to *ā, but the sound change does not occur in closed syllables to circumvent syllable-weight violations. The law is named for Karl Brugmann who first articulated the process in 1879; although Brugmann applied the term "law" to his work, the use of his name was later applied by his regular collaborator Hermann Osthoff.
Fortunatov's law
(Controversial; Sanskrit) When Proto-Indo-European *l precedes a dental consonant, the latter becomes a retroflex consonant and the *l is deleted. Examples include जठर (jaṭhára, 'belly'), which is derived from Proto-Indo-European *ǵelt-, and कुठार (kuṭāra, 'ax'), derived from *kult-. (Note: Compare the Latin word culter ('plowshare') from the same root.) The law is named after the Russian linguist Filipp Fortunatov who proposed it in 1881.
law of the palatals
Also, law of palatals; Palatalgesetz. Proto-Indo-European *e palatalizes velar stops and becomes Proto-Indo-Iranian *a. The process is preceded by the delabialization of the labiovelar consonants. Although several linguists have attempted to identify the originator of the law and several have declared a supposed originator, no consensus has been reached. According to N. E. Collinge, it appears that six different linguists – Hermann Collitz, Ferdinand de Saussure, Johannes Schmidt, Esaias Tegnér Jr., Vilhelm Thomsen, and Karl Verner – discovered the law "roughly simultaneously" and "in entire independence" from one another.
Lubotsky's law
(Not fully accepted) When a laryngeal consonant is preceded by a vowel and followed by a consonant cluster starting with a voiced unaspirated stop, the largyngeal is deleted. Examples of the process include Sanskrit श्लक्ष्णः (ślakṣṇáḥ; 'slippery, smooth'), from Proto-Indo-European *sleh₂ǵsn-. Some linguists like Reiner Lipp have attempted to develop alternative derivations, but Tijmen Pronk finds them unconvincing. Some linguists have rejected putative examples of the law on the basis that they believe Proto-Indo-European had the vowel *a, which they argue explains certain etymologies instead. This view of the Proto-Indo-European vowel inventory remains controversial; Lubotsky has argued trenchantly against *a-based analyses. The law is named for the Russian-Dutch linguist Alexander Lubotsky, who suggested it in a 1981 paper, and first given the appellation by Frederik Kortlandt in 1985.

== Italic ==
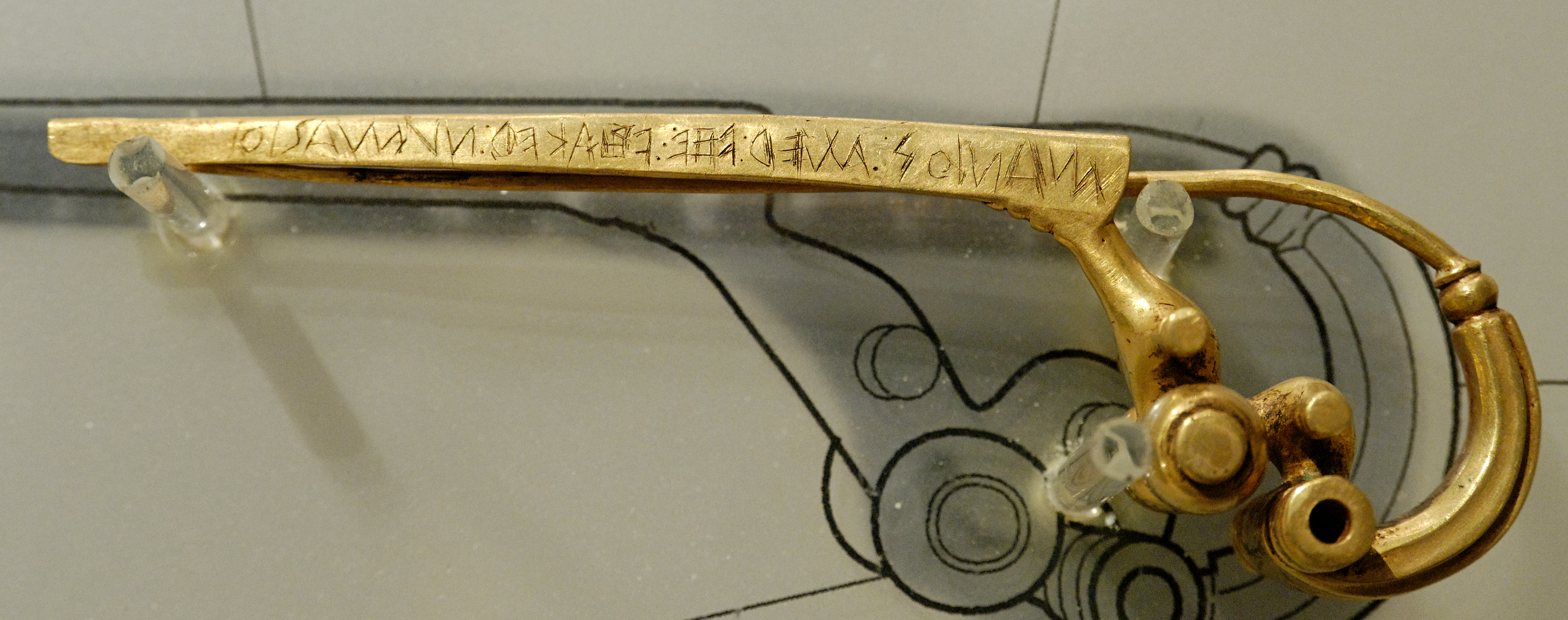
The Praeneste fibula is a golden brooch which contains an inscription considered to be the oldest surviving example of Old Latin, dated to the first half of the 7th century BC.

Bartsch's law
(Gallo-Romance) Also, Bartsch's effect. In open stressed syllables, a palatalizes the preceding consonant before diphthongizing to ie. Examples include Vulgar Latin caru ('dear') becoming Old French chier (modern French cher), whereas Vulgar Latin carru ('cart') became Old French char. The process has been dated to between the 5th and 6th centuries. The law is named after the German medievalist Karl Bartsch who first identified it.
Bugge's canon
In the third-person singular verbs signifying a present or future, the Proto-Indo-European sequence *-ti becomes -t, but if it expresses the past or subjunctive senses, the Proto-Indo-European sequence *-t either becomes -d or is deleted. In Latin, the process sometimes underwent analogical leveling. In Oscan, the future and future perfect end in -st, while in Umbrian, word-final -t was sometimes deleted as well. The scantly-attested Marrucinian and Vestinian languages invariably show the law in process, and all Osco-Umbrian dialects have no exceptions in the plural. When Oscan was written with the Greek alphabet, d is seemingly inexplicably written with Greek τ, (Note: The term půd has been attested as πωτ, for example.) though this has been attributed to difficulty representing Oscan phonology as some other spelling alternations are attested with both in the same script. (Note: Compare pocapit in one text with púkkapíd another.) Edwin W. Fay argues that word-final Proto-Italic *t and *d became indistinguishable early in their history but were later differentiated by sandhi. The law is named after the Norwegian philologist Sophus Bugge who first articulated the concept in 1874.
Exon's law
In a word with four or more syllables, if the second and third syllable are light, then the vowel of the second syllable is syncopated. Some examples do not appear to work unless the entire paradigm is considered. Vowels which occur as a result of anaptyxis do not undergo the process as they succeed the law chronologically. The law is named for the British classicist Charles Exon who first formulated the law in 1906, though its current form was conceived by the American linguist Andrew Sihler.
humī rule
(Latino-Faliscan) In unaccented word-initial syllables, historic *o becomes u before m. Examples include umbilīcus ('navel') against Ancient Greek ὀμφαλός (omphalós), both from Proto-Indo-European *h₃n̥bʰ-, and uncus ('hook') against Ancient Greek ὄγκος (ónkos, 'barb of an arrow'), from Proto-Indo-European *h₂onḱ-. Most counterexamples can be attributed to consonantal changes, such as somnus ('sleep'), derived from Proto-Indo-European *swep-no-. A handful of exceptions can be attributed to previous vowel changes, including glomus ('ball-shaped mass'), from an earlier *glemus. While typically attributed to Latin, it is possible the law also applied to Faliscan. It is unlikely that the law applied to the Sabellic languages. The name is derived from the Latin word humī ('on the ground'), which exhibits this rule.
Lachmann's law
When a short vowel is followed by an etymologically voiced stop followed by a voiceless stop, it is lengthened. The process explains the differences between verbal forms, such as agō ('I drive') and cadō ('I fall'), and their respective derivatives, such as āctus ('made, done') and cāsus ('a fall'). Although the law was popularized by Paul Kiparsky, it is named for the German classicist Karl Lachmann who wrote about the process in 1850. It is unclear if the law applied to the whole Italic language family, but it applied at least to Latin.
Nyman's law
(Latin) In tautosyllabic contexts, when a dental consonant is followed by a liquid consonant, the dental consonant assimilates and the cluster becomes a geminate. In heterosyllabic contexts, the dental consonant becomes a velar consonant. Examples include the tautosyllabic pullus ('chick') against the heterosyllabic pōclum ('drinking cup'). The law is named for the Finnish linguist Martti Nyman, who proposed the law in 1977.
pius law
Also, Thurneysen's law. The Proto-Italic diphthong *ūy, derived from a Proto-Indo-European sequence of *u followed by a laryngeal and *i, is fronted to *īy. Examples include Oscan piíhiúí ('pious [dative singular]') and Latin pius ('pious'), both from Proto-Italic *pīyo- derived from Proto-Indo-European *puh₂yo- 'pure'. The root is shared with the Latin pūrus ('pure'), derived from Proto-Indo-European *puH-ro- ('clean'), which did not undergo this change. Warren Cowgill argued that this law also occurred in Celtic in attempting to unify both Italic and Celtic into a double-jointed Italo-Celtic subfamily.
Thurneysen–Havet's law
Also, Havet's law; Thurneysen–Havet–Vine's law. Proto-Italic *o becomes *a before a *w followed by a vowel. This process precedes the Proto-Italic rounding of the diphthong *e to *o before *w. Examples include Latin caueō ('I am weary of, I beware of'), derived from Proto-Indo-European *kowh₁-eyo-, whence Ancient Greek κοέω (koéō; 'I am aware, I perceive'). Though originally formulated for Latin only, examples of the process in Umbrian, as in sauitu, (Note: The exact meaning of this word is unknown, though it may be related to Latin saucius ('wounded').) and probably Venetic, as in the personal name ho.s.tihau.o, are also attested. Brent Vine considers the law to be one of the oldest, if not the oldest, processes common to Proto-Italic. It also precedes the emergence of initial stress following the loss of Proto-Indo-European lexical pitch, which may make it even earlier than Proto-Italic. The law is named for the Swiss linguist Rudolf Thurneysen and the French classicist Louis Havet, who appear to have developed the concept largely independently of each other in 1884 and 1885, respectively. However, the Swiss linguist Ferdinand de Saussure first articulated the concept in 1879.

== Tocharian ==
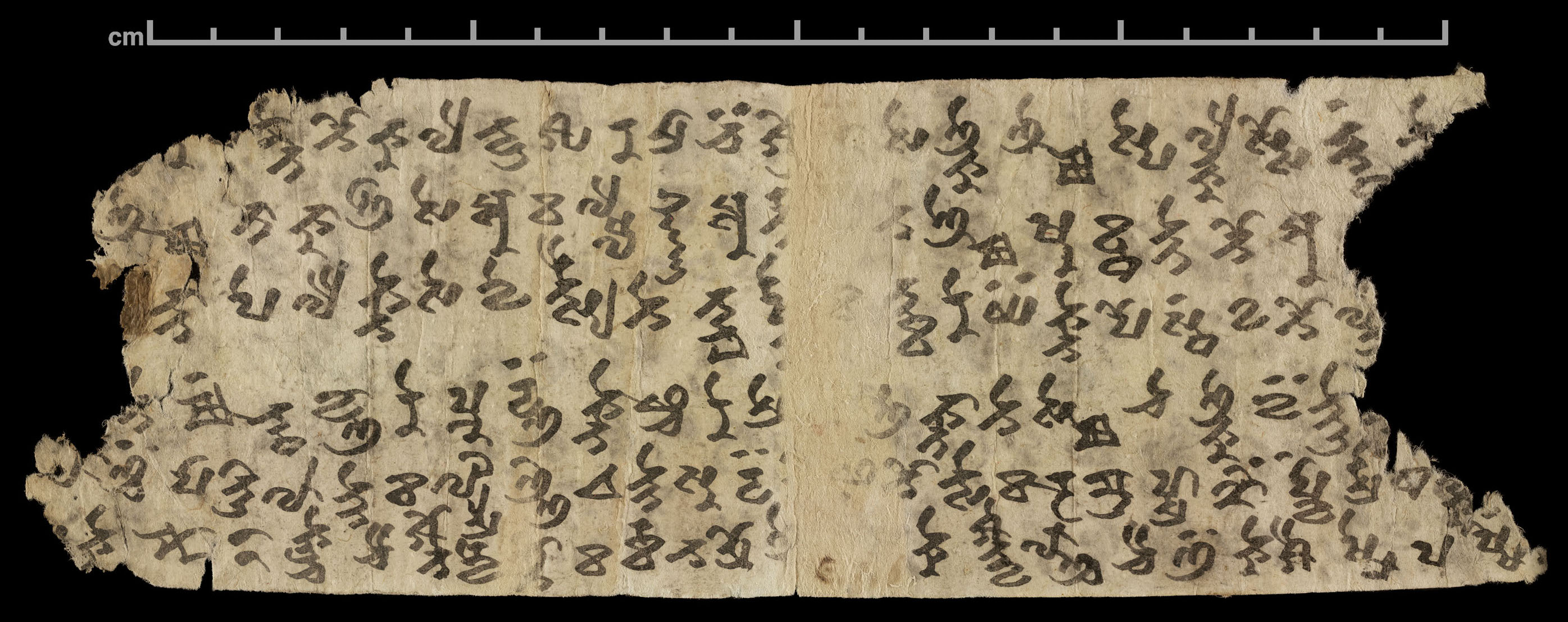
A Buddhist manuscript discovered in Endere written in Tocharian B, dated to the 7th or 8th century AD

Klingenschmitt's rule
(Tocharian B) Before the introduction of the Tocharian B accent rule, ä is deleted from the second syllable when it occurs between two nasal consonants. If the accent would have fallen on the syllable with the deleted vowel, the stress moves to the first syllable. It is possible that the law may also apply in instances where ä is flanked by two identical or very similar non-nasal consonants, though this has not been firmly established. In some instances, it is unclear whether the applicable sound law for a term is the result of Klingenschmitt's rule or the pātär rule because the reflexes can be explained through either process. The law is named for the German linguist Gert Klingenschmitt who first articulated the concept in 1994.
pātär rule
(Tocharian B) Also, pātär accentuation rule. In a word which is underlyingly three or more syllables, when the primary syllable contains a full vowel – often ā or *æ – and the second syllable contains ä or its reflex e, the primary syllable is stressed. Examples of this include eṅkoṣ (plural preterite participle of 'seize'), from earlier *ǽnkäwæṣə, as contrasted with ltuweṣ (preterite participle of 'go out'), from earlier *lätä́wæṣä. The name comes from the German linguist Melanie Malzahn's use of the term pātär (accusative singular of 'father') as an example, being derived from earlier *pā́tärä. Though the law is credited to Malzahn's 2010 work, significant aspects of the full vowel conditions were originally identified by the Icelandic linguist Þórhallur Eyþórsson in his 1993 analysis of Tocharian accent.
yāmu rule
(Tocharian B) Also, yāmu condition. In words of three or more syllables, Proto-Tocharian stress moves from the first syllable to the second syllable unless the first syllable contains a non-high vowel and the second has a schwa or "schwa-antecedent" (i.e., *i, *e, *u, or *R̥), even when the resulting Tocharian B word has fewer syllables. Examples include the Proto-Tocharian form *lə́klænta becoming läklénta ('sorrows'), but *yáməwə becoming yā́mu ('done').

== See also ==
- Algonquian sound laws
- Carter's law – Proto-Siouan sound law
- Dahl's law – Proto-Bantu sound law
- Dorsey's law – Siouan sound law
- Geers's law – Akkadian sound law
- Hermann's bridge – Rule in ancient Greek poetry
- Kaluza's law – Rule in Old English poetry
- Klingenheben's law – Hausa sound law
- Meeussen's rule – Tonic sound rule
- Porson's law – Rule in ancient Greek tragedy
- Whorf's law – Uto-Aztecan law
