= Johann Gottfried Jakob Hermann =

German classical scholar and philologist (1772–1848)

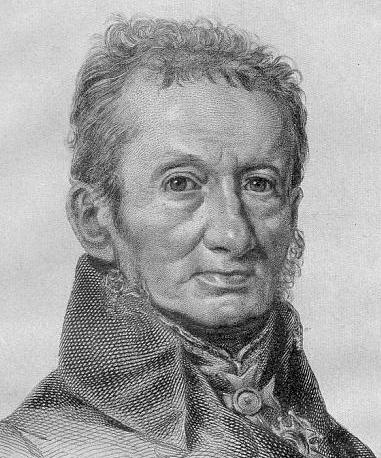
Gottfried Hermann

Johann Gottfried Jakob Hermann (28 November 1772 – 31 December 1848) was a German classical scholar and philologist. He published his works under the name Gottfried Hermann or its Latin equivalent Godofredus Hermannus.

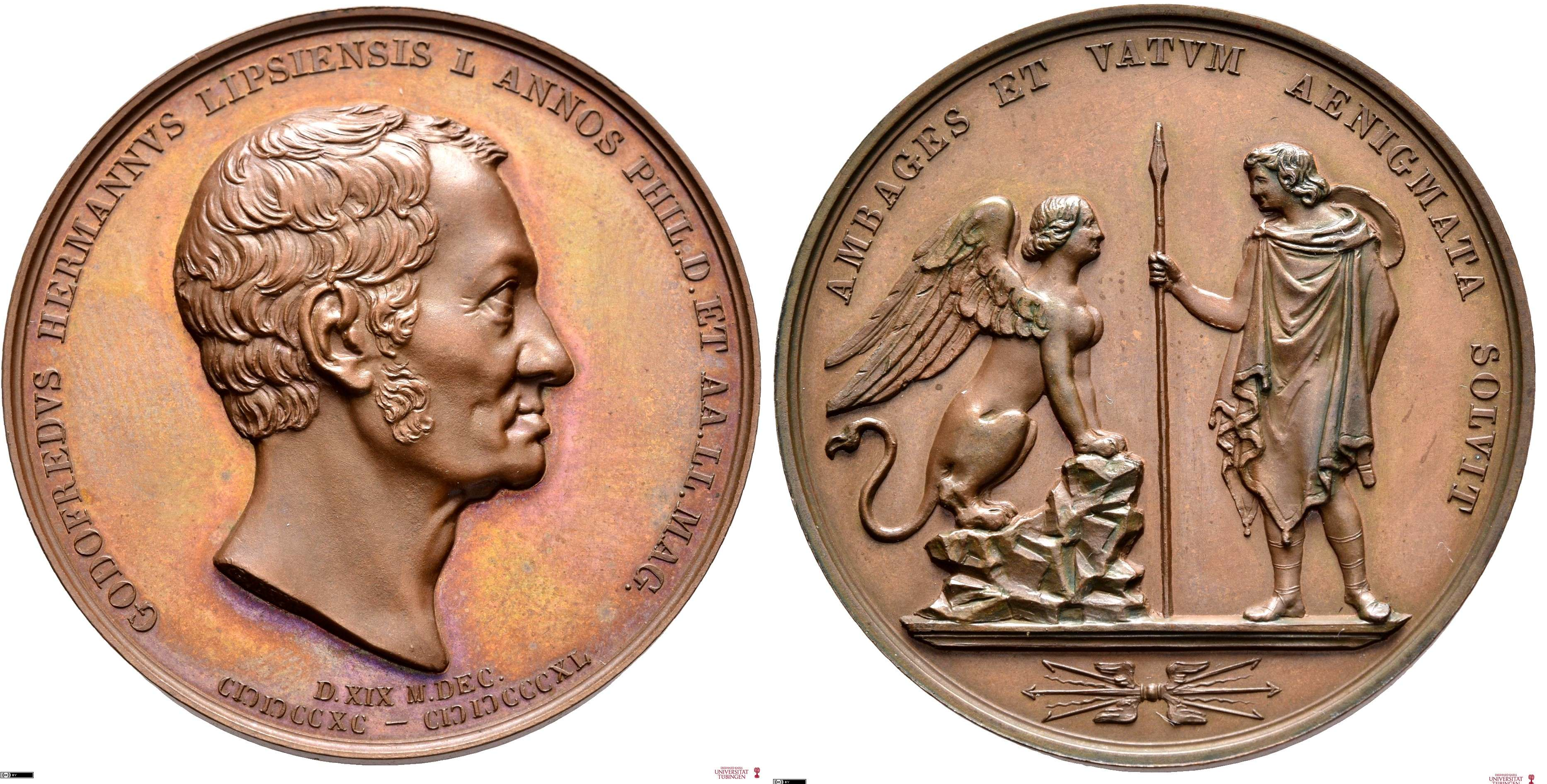
Medal awarded to Gottfried Hermann (1840)

== Biography ==
Hermann was born in Leipzig. Entering its university at the age of fourteen, he at first studied law, which he soon abandoned for the classics (it was Friedrich Wolfgang Reiz who introduced him to philology).

After a semester at Jena in 1793–1794, he became a lecturer in classical literature in Leipzig, in 1798 professor extraordinarius of philosophy in the university, and in 1803 professor of eloquence (and poetry, 1809). His students included Leopold von Ranke.

In 1840, on the occasion of his 50th doctoral anniversary, he received a medal.

He died in Leipzig.

== Views ==
Hermann maintained that an accurate knowledge of the Greek and Latin languages was the only road to a clear understanding of the intellectual life of the ancient world, and the chief, if not the only, aim of philology. As the leader of this grammatico-critical school, he came into collision with August Böckh and Karl Otfried Müller, the representatives of the historico-antiquarian school, which regarded Hermann's view of philology as inadequate and one-sided.

== Works ==
Hermann devoted his early attention to the classical poetical metres, and published several works on that subject, the most important being Elementa doctrinae metricae (1816), in which he set forth a scientific theory based on the Kantian categories. He also wrote a Handbuch der Metrik (1798) and De metris poetarum graecorum et romanorum (1796), in which he first notes the avoidance of word break in hexameter now called Hermann's Bridge. His writings on Greek grammar are also valuable, especially De emendanda ratione Graecae grammaticae (1801), and notes and excursus on François Viger's treatise on Greek idioms. The principles of the new method he introduced are not only explicitly developed in De Emendenda Ratione Græcæ Grammaticæ, but are practically illustrated in his numerous editions of the ancient classics.

His editions of the classics include several of the plays of Euripides; the Clouds of Aristophanes (1799); Trinummus of Plautus (1800); Poëtica of Aristotle (1802); Orphica, a collection of works of Orphic literature (1805); the Homeric Hymns (1806); and the Lexicon of Photius (1808). In 1825 Hermann finished the edition of Sophocles begun by Erfurdt. His edition of Aeschylus was published after his death in 1852. The Opuscula, a collection of his smaller writings in Latin, appeared in seven volumes in Leipzig between 1827 and 1839. These show his power of dealing with chronological, topographical, and personal questions, and also contain some poems.

== Sources ==
- This work in turn cites:
  - Monograph by Otto Jahn (1849)
  - Monograph by Hermann Köchly (1874)
  - Conrad Bursian, Geschichte der klassischen Philologie in Deutschland (1883)
  - Conrad Bursian (1880). "Hermann, Gottfried" . Allgemeine Deutsche Biographie (in German). Vol. 12. Leipzig: Duncker & Humblot. pp. 174–180.
  - Sandys, History Class. Schol. iii.
- This work in turn cites:
  - Jahn, Gottfried Hermann, eine Gedächtnisrede (Leipzig, 1849)
  - Köchly, Gottfried Hermann (Heidelberg, 1874)
  - Bursian, Geschichte der klassischen Philologie in Deutschland (Munich, 1883)
