= Geers's law =

Akkadian sound law

Geers's law is a phonological rule for the Akkadian language according to which two different emphatic consonants (ṭ, ṣ, ḳ) cannot occur in one Akkadian word. It is named after Friedrich Geers who discovered it in 1945.

The law usually pertains to inherited Semitic roots whose emphatics were usually dissimilated. Compare:

- Proto-Semitic *ṣ̂bṭ > Akkadian ṣabātu "to seize"
- Proto-Semitic *ḳṭn > Akkadian ḳatānu "to be thin"
- Proto-Semitic *ḳṣr > Akkadian kaṣāru "to bind"
- Proto-Semitic *ṣ̂yḳ> Akkadian siāḳu "to be narrow"

Dissimilation is more likely if the emphatics were glottalic consonants.

It also affected loanwords, such as Amorite *qṭl > Akkadian ḳtl. In rare cases it did not apply, such as ḳaṣû instead of kaṣû.

If Proto-Semitic emphatics were ejective consonants, then Geers's law is explained as a manifestation of the widespread constraint in languages having ejectives, which forbids the co-occurrence of two ejectives in a root.

== See also ==
- Glossary of sound laws in the Indo-European languages
- Klingenheben's law – Hausa-language sound law
