= Frederik Kortlandt =

Dutch linguist (born 1946)

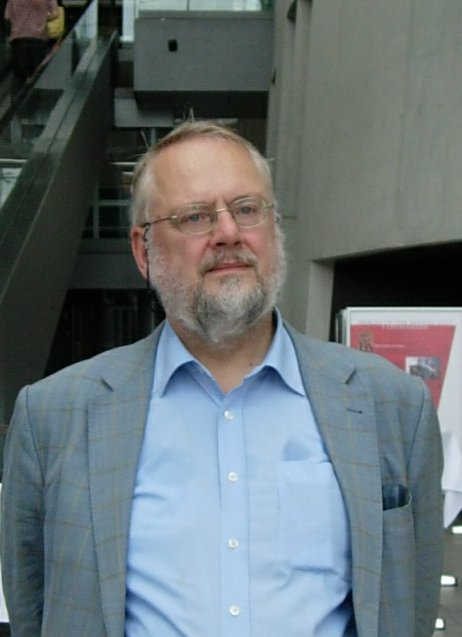
- Kortlandt in 2006
- Born: 19 June 1946 (age 80); Utrecht, Netherlands
- Spouse: Annie Kortlandt

Academic background
- Thesis: Modelling the Phoneme: New trends in East European phonemic theory (1972)
- Doctoral advisor: Carl Lodewijk Ebeling

Academic work
- Institutions: Leiden University
- Main interests: Indo-European languages, historical linguistics

Frederik Herman Henri "Frits" Kortlandt (born 19 June 1946) is a Dutch former professor of descriptive and comparative linguistics at Leiden University in the Netherlands. He writes on Baltic and Slavic languages, the Indo-European languages in general, and Proto-Indo-European, though he has also published studies of languages in other language families. He has also studied ways to associate language families into super-groups such as the controversial Indo-Uralic.

== Biography ==
Kortlandt was born on 19 June 1946 in Utrecht. Kortlandt, along with George van Driem and a few other colleagues, is one of the proponents of the Leiden school of linguistics, which describes language in terms of a meme or benign parasite.

Kortlandt holds five degrees from the University of Amsterdam:

- B.A., 1967, Slavic Linguistics and Literature
- B.A., 1967, mathematics and economics
- M.A., 1969, Slavic linguistics
- M.A., 1970, mathematical economics
- Ph.D., 1972, mathematical linguistics

He obtained his PhD under Carl Lodewijk Ebeling with a thesis titled: "Modelling the phoneme: New trends in East European phonemic theory". Kortlandt was a professor of Slavic Languages at Leiden University between 1975 and 2011.

Kortlandt has been a member of the Royal Netherlands Academy of Arts and Sciences since 1986 and is a 1997 Spinozapremie laureate. In 2007, he composed a version of Schleicher's fable, a story written in a hypothetical, reconstructed Proto-Indo-European, which differs radically from all previous versions.
