= Edwin Whitfield Fay =

American philologist (1865–1920)

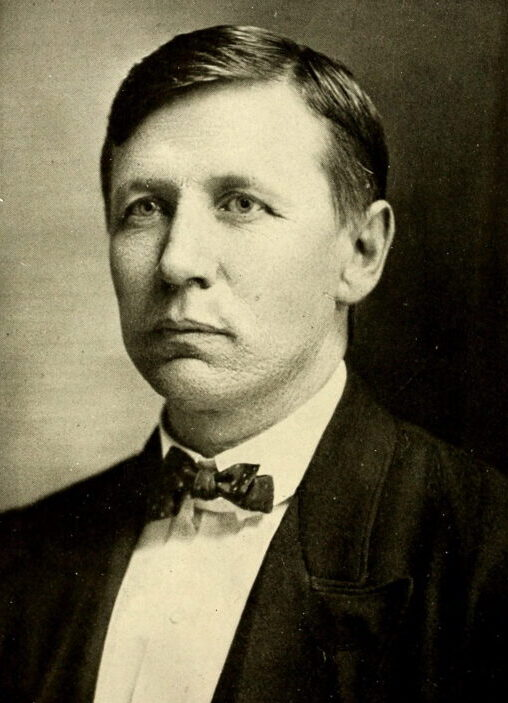
- Born: January 1, 1865; Minden, Louisiana, U.S.
- Died: February 17, 1920 (aged 55); Pittsburgh, Pennsylvania, U.S.
- Spouse: Lucy Belle Hemphill (m. 1904)
- Children: 2

Academic background
- Education: Johns Hopkins University
- Thesis: The Treatment of Rig-Veda Mantras in the Grhya Sūtras (1890)

Academic work
- Discipline: Classical philology
- Sub-discipline: Latin; Sanskrit
- Institutions: University of Michigan; University of Texas; Washington and Lee College

Edwin Whitfield Fay (January 1, 1865 – February 17, 1920) was an American philologist, best known for his contributions to the study of Latin and Sanskrit.

== Biography ==
He graduated from Southwestern Presbyterian University in 1883, received the degree of Ph.D. at Johns Hopkins University in 1890, and studied at the University of Leipzig in 1891–92. In 1890-91 he was instructor in Sanskrit and classics at the University of Michigan, in 1892-93 he was acting associate professor of Latin at the University of Texas, in 1893-99 professor of Latin at Washington and Lee College, and beginning 1899 professor of Latin at the University of Texas until his death in Pittsburgh while visiting his sister.

== Works ==
- A History of Education in Louisiana (1898)
- The Treatment of Rig-Veda Mantras in the Yrhya Sutras (1899)
- T. Macci Planti Mostellaria (1902)

He also published works in journals, mostly academic, but some popular.
