= Carl Lodewijk Ebeling =

Dutch linguist (1924–2017)

Carl Ebeling
- Born: 8 February 1924; Zaandam, Netherlands
- Died: 24 February 2017 (aged 93); Graft, Netherlands
- Education: Harvard University
- Known for: Contributions to Slavic and Baltic linguistics; Ebeling's law
- Scientific career
- Fields: Linguistics, Slavic studies, Baltic studies
- Workplaces: University of Amsterdam

Carl Lodewijk Ebeling (8 February 1924 – 24 February 2017) was a Dutch linguist specializing in Slavic and Baltic languages. He was a professor at the University of Amsterdam from 1955 to 1985.

== Biography ==
Ebeling was born in Zaandam on 8 February 1924. He finished his Doctoraalexamen in Slavic languages at the University of Amsterdam in 1947. He then moved to the United States and studied Slavic languages at Harvard University and obtained his PhD there under Roman Jakobson in 1950 with a thesis titled: The parts of the sentence in modern Russian: a structural analysis.

Ebeling returned to the Netherlands and from 1955 to 1960 he was professor of Slavic languages. He subsequently became professor of both Slavic and Baltic languages. He retired in 1985.

In 1954 Ebeling started formulating his ideas on syntax in an article. In 1978 he wrote his magnum opus on the topic, Syntax and Semantics. A Taxonomic Approach. He followed this up in 2006 with the Dutch-language Semiotaxis. Over theoretische en Nederlandse syntaxis. In the 1960s Ebeling came up with a law-like theory of verbal paradigmic accentuation in Slavic, and possibly Balto-Slavic languages.

Ebeling was elected a member of the Royal Netherlands Academy of Arts and Sciences in 1979.

Ebeling died in Graft on 24 February 2017.
