= Hermann's bridge =

Greek prosody rule

In the prosody of Greek dactylic hexameter poetry, Hermann's bridge is the tendency to avoid a word break between the two shorts of the fourth foot. It is named for Gottfried Hermann, who first identified the phenomenon in his 1796 work, De metris poetarum graecorum et romanorum.

Hermann's bridge is extensively demonstrated throughout both the Iliad and the Odyssey, with counts varying from 300 violations to just 44, depending on how strictly Hermann's bridge is defined, and with the vast majority of those violations occurring on an enclitic. These violations can be seen as having rhetorical intent, serving to emphasize part of the poem.
