= Tijmen Pronk =

Dutch linguist (born 1979)

Tijmen Pronk (born 1979) is a Dutch comparative linguist. His research focuses on etymology, historical phonology, morphology and prosody, and dialectology.

Pronk studied Slavic languages and literature and comparative Indo-European linguistics at Leiden University, where he also passed his viva (in 2009) with a dissertation "The Slovene dialect of Potschach in the Gailtal, Austria". This dissertation was subsequently published by Brill Publishers in their series "Studies in Slavic and General Linguistics".

Pronk is widely recognised as a leading specialist in comparative Indo-European linguistics and Slovene dialectology and in that capacity has been one of the authors of the Croatian Etymological Dictionary.

In recent years, Pronk has widened his academic scope and is now involved in debates surrounding the origins of Proto-Indo-European and its relation with Anatolian languages. Together with Alwin Kloekhorst, he published a volume on the Precursors of Proto-Indo-European, and has presented some of his ideas on the spread of Proto-Indo-European in various scholarly conferences, including at the 2019 European Association of Archaeologists's Annual Meeting in Bern, Switzerland.
