= Coronal stop =

A coronal stop is a stop consonant articulated with the front part of the tongue (whence "coronal"). Depending on the precise place of articulation, several types can be distinguished:

- Dental stops, articulated with the tongue touching the upper teeth
- Alveolar stops, articulated with the tongue touching the alveolar ridge behind the upper teeth
- Postalveolar stops, articulated with the tongue touching the back of the alveolar ridge
