= Odesan Russian =

Dialect of the Russian language spoken in Odesa, Ukraine

- Region: Odesa
- Ethnicity: Various
- Language family: Indo-European: Balto-Slavic; Slavic; East Slavic; Russian; Odesan Russian
- Early forms: Proto-Balto-Slavic: Proto-Slavic; Old East Slavic
- Writing system: Cyrillic script (Russian alphabet)

Language codes
- ISO 639-3: –
- IETF: ru-u-sd-ua51

Odesan Russian (Russian: Одесский язык, romanized: Odessky yazyk, lit. 'Odesan language') is a vernacular contact variety of the Russian language that originated in and around the city of Odesa, Ukraine. It is characterised by significant substrates of Ukrainian and Yiddish, as well as Polish, and by lexical borrowings from French, Greek, and Turkish—resulting from the interactions of the notable ethnic groups of Odesan residents. It was well identified at the turn of the 20th century, but its prominence gradually decreased over time, especially in the 21st century, with the considerable influx of ethnic Ukrainians into the city.

According to the Russian Empire census of 1897, Yiddish was the second most widely spoken language in Odesa, spoken by about 30% of the population. In addition, the Jews of Odesa were not confined to ghettos, took an active part in the economic and cultural life of the city, and were much more secularised compared to Jews in the rest of the Russian Empire. This resulted in a considerable number of contacts between the Jewish and non-Jewish general populations and may explain the significant Yiddish substrate in Odesan Russian. This fact has led linguist Anna Verschik to consider Odesan Russian to be one of the Jewish languages. Lenore Grenoble remarks that scholarly linguistic analysis of Odesan Russian is scarce, despite the fact that it constitutes a notable part of Russian culture.

Konstantin Zelenetsky, a Russian professor and scholar, studied the language of local residents in the 19th century and, based on the results, came to the conclusion that the language of Odesa is certainly Russified, but it has so many "Little Russianisms and Galicianisms, that there is a question of whether it is Russian or "Little Russian (Ukrainian)"?

Inna Kabanen writes that the "Odesan language", with its apparent "incorrectness", has become a staple of Russian-language Jewish humour, and as such has become mythologised. Many "Odesan" expressions are not recognised as such by native speakers.

An 1895 sampler of Odesan speech can be found in the feuilleton "Odesan Language" by journalist Vlas Doroshevich. Yevgeny Golubovsky credits Doroshevich with the invention of the term "Odesan language".

== See also ==
- Russian language in Ukraine
- Surzhyk
- Russian dialects
- Culture of Odesa
