= Bratteli =

Bratteli is a surname. Notable people with the surname include:

- Ola Bratteli (1946–2015), Norwegian mathematician
- Randi Bratteli (1924–2002), Norwegian journalist
- Trygve Bratteli (1910–1984), Norwegian newspaper editor and politician
