= Odometer (disambiguation) =

Odometer is an instrument used for measuring the distance travelled by a vehicle.

Odometer may also refer to:

- Odometer fraud, the illegal practice of rolling back odometers to make it appear that vehicles have lower mileage than they actually do.
- Markov odometer, a certain type of dynamical system
- Nonsingular odometer, a basic example of a Markov odometer
