= Bratteli diagram =

Graph of a dynamical system

In mathematics, a Bratteli diagram is a combinatorial structure: a graph composed of vertices labelled by positive integers ("level") and unoriented edges between vertices having levels differing by one. The notion was introduced by Ola Bratteli in 1972 in the theory of operator algebras to describe directed sequences of finite-dimensional algebras: it played an important role in Elliott's classification of AF-algebras and the theory of subfactors. Subsequently Anatoly Vershik associated dynamical systems with infinite paths in such graphs.

== Definition ==
A Bratteli diagram is given by the following objects:

- A sequence of sets V_{n} ('the vertices at level n ') labeled by positive integer set N. In some literature each element v of V_{n} is accompanied by a positive integer b_{v} > 0.
- A sequence of sets E_{n} ('the edges from level n to n + 1 ') labeled by N, endowed with maps s: E_{n} → V_{n} and r: E_{n} → V_{n+1}, such that:
  - For each v in V_{n}, the number of elements e in E_{n} with s(e) = v is finite.
  - So is the number of e ∈ E_{n−1} with r(e) = v.
  - When the vertices have markings by positive integers b_{v}, the number a_{v, v '} of the edges with s(e) = v and r(e) = v' for v ∈ V_{n} and v' ∈ V_{n+1} satisfies b_{v} a_{v, v'} ≤ b_{v'}.

A customary way to pictorially represent Bratteli diagrams is to align the vertices according to their levels, and put the number b_{v} beside the vertex v, or use that number in place of v, as in

alt=E_0={a}. a is labeled 1, and has two edges to b and one to c. E_1={b,c}. b is labeled 2, and has one edge to d. c is labeled 1, and has one edge to d and one to e. E_2={d,e}. d is labeled 3, and has one edge to f. e is labeled 1, and has one edge to f and one to g. E_3={f,g}. f is labeled 4. g is labeled 1. Etc.

An ordered Bratteli diagram is a Bratteli diagram together with a partial order on E_{n} such that for any v ∈ V_{n} the set { e ∈ E_{n−1} : r(e) = v } is totally ordered. Edges that do not share a common range vertex are incomparable. This partial order allows us to define the set of all maximal edges E_{max} and the set of all minimal edges E_{min}. A Bratteli diagram with a unique infinitely long path in E_{max} and E_{min} is called essentially simple.

== Sequence of finite-dimensional algebras ==
Any semisimple algebra over the complex numbers C of finite dimension can be expressed as a direct sum ⊕_{k} M_{n_{k}}(C) of matrix algebras, and the C-algebra homomorphisms between two such algebras up to inner automorphisms on both sides are completely determined by the multiplicity number between 'matrix algebra' components. Thus, an injective homomorphism of ⊕_{k=1}^{i} M_{n_{k}}(C) into ⊕_{l=1}^{j} M_{m_{l}}(C) may be represented by a collection of positive numbers a_{k, l} satisfying Σ n_{k} a_{k, l} ≤ m_{l}. (The equality holds if and only if the homomorphism is unital; we can allow non-injective homomorphisms by allowing some a_{k,l} to be zero.) This can be illustrated as a bipartite graph having the vertices marked by numbers (n_{k})_{k} on one hand and the ones marked by (m_{l})_{l} on the other hand, and having a_{k, l} edges between the vertex n_{k} and the vertex m_{l}.

Thus, when we have a sequence of finite-dimensional semisimple algebras A_{n} and injective homomorphisms φ_{n} : A_{n'} → A_{n+1}: between them, we obtain a Bratteli diagram by putting

V_{n} = the set of simple components of A_{n}

(each isomorphic to a matrix algebra), marked by the size of matrices.

(E_{n}, r, s): the number of the edges between M_{n_{k}}(C) ⊂ A_{n} and M_{m_{l}}(C) ⊂ A_{n+1} is equal to the multiplicity of M_{n_{k}}(C) into M_{m_{l}}(C) under φ_{n}.

== Sequence of split semisimple algebras ==
Any semisimple algebra (possibly of infinite dimension) is one whose modules are completely reducible, i.e. they decompose into the direct sum of simple modules. Let $A_0 \subseteq A_1 \subseteq A_2 \subseteq \cdots$ be a chain of split semisimple algebras, and let $\hat A_i$ be the indexing set for the irreducible representations of $A_i$. Denote by $A_i^\lambda$ the irreducible module indexed by $\lambda \in \hat A_i$. Because of the inclusion $A_i \subseteq A_{i+1}$, any $A_{i+1}$-module $M$ restricts to a $A_i$-module. Let $g_{\lambda, \mu}$ denote the decomposition numbers

$$A_{i+1}^\mu \downarrow^{A_{i+1}}_{A_i} = \bigoplus_{\lambda \in \hat A_i} g_{\lambda,\mu} A_i^\lambda.$$

The Bratteli diagram for the chain $A_0 \subseteq A_1 \subseteq A_2 \subseteq \cdots$ is obtained by placing one vertex for every element of $\hat A_i$ on level $i$ and connecting a vertex $\lambda$ on level $i$ to a vertex $\mu$ on level $i+1$ with $g_{\lambda,\mu}$ edges.

=== Examples ===
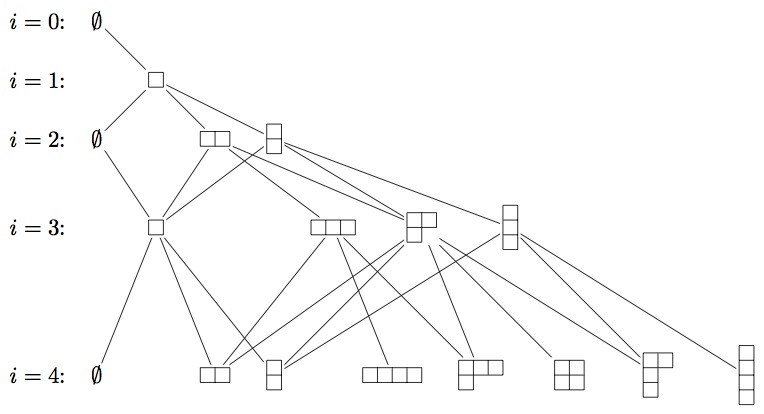
Bratteli diagram for Brauer and BMW algebras on i=0,1,2,3, and 4 strands.

(1) If $A_i = S_i$, the ith symmetric group, the corresponding Bratteli diagram is the same as Young's lattice.

(2) If $A_i$ is the Brauer algebra or the Birman–Wenzl algebra on i strands, then the resulting Bratteli diagram has partitions of i–2k (for $k=0,1,2,\ldots,\lfloor i/2 \rfloor$) with one edge between partitions on adjacent levels if one can be obtained from the other by adding or subtracting 1 from a single part.

(3) If $A_i$ is the Temperley–Lieb algebra on i strands, the resulting Bratteli has integers i–2k (for $k=0,1,2,\ldots,\lfloor i/2 \rfloor$) with one edge between integers on adjacent levels if one can be obtained from the other by adding or subtracting 1.

== See also ==
- Bratteli–Vershik diagram
