= Approximately finite-dimensional =

In operator algebras, an algebra is said to be approximately finite-dimensional if it contains an increasing sequence of finite-dimensional subalgebras that is dense. One can consider

- Approximately finite dimensional C*-algebras, or
- Approximately finite-dimensional von Neumann algebras.
