= Pedersen's law =

Proto-Balto-Slavic sound law

Pedersen's law, named after the Danish linguist Holger Pedersen, is a law of accentuation in Balto-Slavic languages which states that the stress was retracted from stressed medial syllables in paradigms with mobile accent.

It was originally proposed by Ferdinand de Saussure for Baltic to explain forms such as Lithuanian dùkterį, dùkteres (compare Ancient Greek thugatéra, thugatéres), but was later generalized in 1933 to Balto-Slavic by Pedersen, who then assumed that accentual mobility spread from the consonant-stems to Balto-Slavic eh₂-stems and o-stems.

The term "Pedersen's law" is also applied to later Common Slavic developments in which the stress retraction to prefixes/proclitics can be traced in mobile paradigms, such as Russian ná vodu 'onto the water', né byl 'was not', pródal 'sold', and póvod 'rein'.

Proto-Indo-European *dʰugh₂tḗr 'daughter', with accusative singular *dʰugh₂térm̥ (Ancient Greek thugátēr, acc. sg. thugatéra) > Lithuanian duktė̃, acc. sg. dùkterį.

Proto-Indo-European *poh₂imń̥ ~ *poh₂imén 'shepherd' (Ancient Greek poimḗn, accusative singular poiména) > Lithuanian piemuõ, acc. sg. píemenį.

Proto-Indo-European *golHwéh₂ with Balto-Slavic semantics of 'head' > Lithuanian galvà (with accusative singular gálvą), Russian golová (acc. sg. gólovu), Chakavian glāvȁ (acc. sg. glȃvu).

Within the relative chronology of Balto-Slavic sound changes, this law was, in its first occurrence in the Balto-Slavic period, posterior to the loss of Proto-Indo-European accentual mobility (i.e. later than the advent of Balto-Slavic mobile paradigms, such as the above-mentioned Lithuanian duktė̃, as opposed to non-final stress in Ancient Greek etymons), so its application was originally limited to the inflection of polysyllabic consonant stems.

Later the retraction of stress spread by analogy to non-consonant stems in case-forms where Pedersen's law applied (commonly termed "barytonesis"). Thus we have accusative singular forms of Lithuanian ãvį 'sheep', sū́nų 'son', diẽvą 'god', žiẽmą 'winter'. Afterwards oxytonesis, Hirt's law, and Winter's law applied.

== See also ==
- Glossary of sound laws in the Indo-European languages
