= Barytonesis =

Movement of stress from a final syllable

In phonology, barytonesis, or recessive accent, is the shift of accent from the last or following syllable to any non-final or preceding syllable of the stem, as in John Donne's poetic line: but éxtreme sense hath made them desperate, the Balto-Slavic Pedersen's law and Aeolic Greek barytonesis. In Biblical Hebrew grammar, barytonesis is called נסוג אחור (nasog akhor, literally 'receding backwards').

The opposite, the accent shift to the last syllable is called oxytonesis.

== See also ==
- Glossary of sound laws in the Indo-European languages
