= Sergei Vasilyevich Kerov =

Russian mathematician

Sergei Vasilyevich Kerov (Russian: Сергей Васильевич Керов; born 21 June 1946 in Leningrad died 30 July 2000) was a Russian mathematician and university professor. His research included operator algebras, combinatorics, probability and representation theory.

== Life ==
Kerov was born in 1946 in Leningrad (now St. Petersburg). His father Vasily Kerov was a teacher for analytical chemistry at a university in Leningrad and his mother Marianna Nikolayeva was an expert in seed physiology.

Kerov studied at the Saint Petersburg State University. He obtained a PhD in 1975 under the supervision of Anatoly Vershik. He was then a professor at various universities in St. Petersburg, including the Herzen Pedagogical University and the University of Saint Petersburg. From 1993 he did research at the Steklov Institute of Mathematics in St. Petersburg. In 1994 he received a Sc.D. (Doctor of Science) from the Steklov Institute for his work Asymptotic Representation Theory of the Symmetric Group, with Applications to Analysis. From 1995 he was a professor at the University of Saint Petersburg.

In 2000 he died of a brain tumor.

== Work ==
A list of Kerov's scientific articles was published in the Journal of Mathematical Sciences.

In 1977 he proved together with Anatoly Vershik a limit theorem for the Plancherel measure for the symmetric group with a limiting shape which is now called Vershik–Kerov curve. The same result was also independently proved by Logan and Shepp and thus is also called Logan–Shepp curve. The result was later improved by Kerov to a central limit theorem.

== Publications (Selections) ==
=== Research papers ===
- Kerov, S.V. (1999). "Rooks on ferrers boards and matrix integrals". Journal of Mathematical Sciences. 96 (5). Springer: 3531–3536. doi:10.1007/BF02175831.
- S. V. Kerov; G. I. Olshanski (1994). "Polynomial functions on the set of Young diagrams". C. R. Acad. Sci. Paris Sér. I. 319: 121–126.
- Vershik, A.M.; Kerov, S.V. (2007). "Four drafts on the representation theory of the group of infinite matrices over a finite field". Journal of Mathematical Sciences. 147 (6): 7129–7144. arXiv:0705.3605. doi:10.1007/s10958-007-0535-1. S2CID 16877947.

=== Books ===
==== Translated in English ====
- S. V. Kerov (2003). Asymptotic Representation Theory of the Symmetric Group and its Applications in Analysis. American Mathematical Society. ISBN 978-0-8218-3440-4.
