= Alexander Barvinok =

Russian mathematician

- Born: March 27, 1963 (age 63); Leningrad, Soviet Union
- Education: St. Petersburg State University (Ph.D)
- Awards: Presidential Early Career Award for Scientists and Engineers (PECASE)
- Scientific career
- Fields: Mathematics
- Workplaces: University of Michigan (1994–)
- Thesis: Combinatorial Theory of Polytopes with Symmetry and its Applications to Combinatorial Optimization Problems (1988)
- Doctoral advisor: Anatoly Moiseevich Vershik

Alexander I. Barvinok (born March 27, 1963) is a Russian American mathematician and a professor of mathematics at the University of Michigan.

Barvinok received his Ph.D. from St. Petersburg State University in 1988 under the supervision of Anatoly Moiseevich Vershik.

In 1999, Barvinok received the Presidential Early Career Award for Scientists and Engineers (PECASE) from President Bill Clinton.

Barvinok gave an invited talk at the 2006 International Congress of Mathematicians in Madrid.

In 2012, Barvinok became a Fellow of the American Mathematical Society.

In 2023, Barvinok left the American Mathematical Society by refusing to renew his membership in protest of its non-opposition to "DEI statements" and "compelled language", referencing his experiences in the Soviet Union.
