= Randi Bratteli =

Norwegian journalist (1924–2002)

Randi Helene Bratteli (née Larssen; 17 September 1924 – 9 December 2002) was a Norwegian journalist.

She was born in Hamar as the daughter of Olav Larssen and Aslaug Sigrid Larssen (née Rustad). She married Trygve Bratteli, who served as the Prime Minister of Norway from 1971 to 1972 and 1973 to 1976. They had three children: one son, Ola and two daughters, Tone and Marianne. She published several books. She was member of the board of the friendship association Friends of Israel in the Norwegian Labour Movement (Norwegian: Venner av Israel i Norsk Arbeiderbevegelse).
