= Anna Verschik =

Estonian linguist (born 1968)

Anna Verschik (Russian: Анна Вершик, romanized: Anna Vershik; born 31 May 1968) is an Estonian linguist, professor at the Tallinn University. Her interests include social sciences and culture, philology and linguistics, in particular, Ethnolects; Estonian sociolinguistics (language contacts, language dynamics); Estonian-Russian language contacts (code switching, convergence, multilingual conversation); Yiddish in the Baltic States (dialectology, sociolinguistics, cultural contacts); Ukrainian sociolinguistics. She is also a translator from Ukrainian to Estonian.

== Biography ==
Anna Verschik was born in St. Petersburg to the family of the mathematician Anatoly Vershik of Jewish descent. Her family spent vacations in Estonia, Anna had become attracted to Estonian culture and learned Estonian language by herself. She moved to Estonia, and graduated from the University of Tartu (1986–1990) with the degree in Estonian philology. While at Tartu she also studied Yiddish and Jewish culture. In 1995-1996 she undertook a one-semester study of Hebrew and Jewish culture at the University of Oxford and received master's degree from the University of Tartu with the thesis "Multilingualism of Estonian Jews" in 1996. She earned the Ph.D. from the University of Tartu with the thesis "Estonian Yiddish and its contacts with co-territorial languages" (supervided by Tapani Harviainen) in 2000. She was teaching at the Tallinn University since 2002. Before that she held teaching positions at other colleges and universities.

== Books ==
- 2025: Kas rabelen välja sellest tusast? (Ukrainian: "Чи виберуся я з цієї журби", “Will I Break Free from This Sorrow”), EKSA, a collection of translations of Ukrainian poetry into Estonian.
- 2021: Multilingual practices in the Baltic countries. Acta Universitatis Tallinnensis Humaniora. Tallinn: TLU Press, Tallinn University Press. ISBN 978-9985-58-898-7
- 2013: Õmblusteta kudumine = Seamless knitting Koolibri. ISBN 9789985031810
  - 2015: Finnish translation: Saumattomat neuleet. Moraine. ISBN 9789522542373
- 2008: Emerging Bilingual Speech: From Monolingualism to Code-Copying, Bloomsbury Publishing. ISBN 9781441164926

== Awards and recognition ==
Anna Verschik scholarly and literary awards include:

- 2026: annual (for the year of 2025) literary prize of the Estonian Cultural Endowment for translating Ukrainian poetry, for her collection Kas rabelen välja sellest tusast?.
- 2025: August Sang poetry translation award for the translation of Yuliya Musakovska's poem "A magnolia blooms in a foreign garden" (Ukrainian: "Цвіте магнолія в чужому саду") from Ukrainian into Estonian, from the collection Kas rabelen välja sellest tusast?.

== Personal ==
Anna Verschik is married to Estonian Hebraist Jürnas Kokla and they have a daughter, Noemi (15 years in 2007).

Outside the academy, her interests include knitting and other crafts and she regularly published her ideas in the Käsitöö ("Handicraft") magazine. Her book on the subject was translated in Finnish and she gives lessons on her methodology.
