= Anatoly Vershik =

Russian mathematician (1933–2024)

- Анатолий Вершик
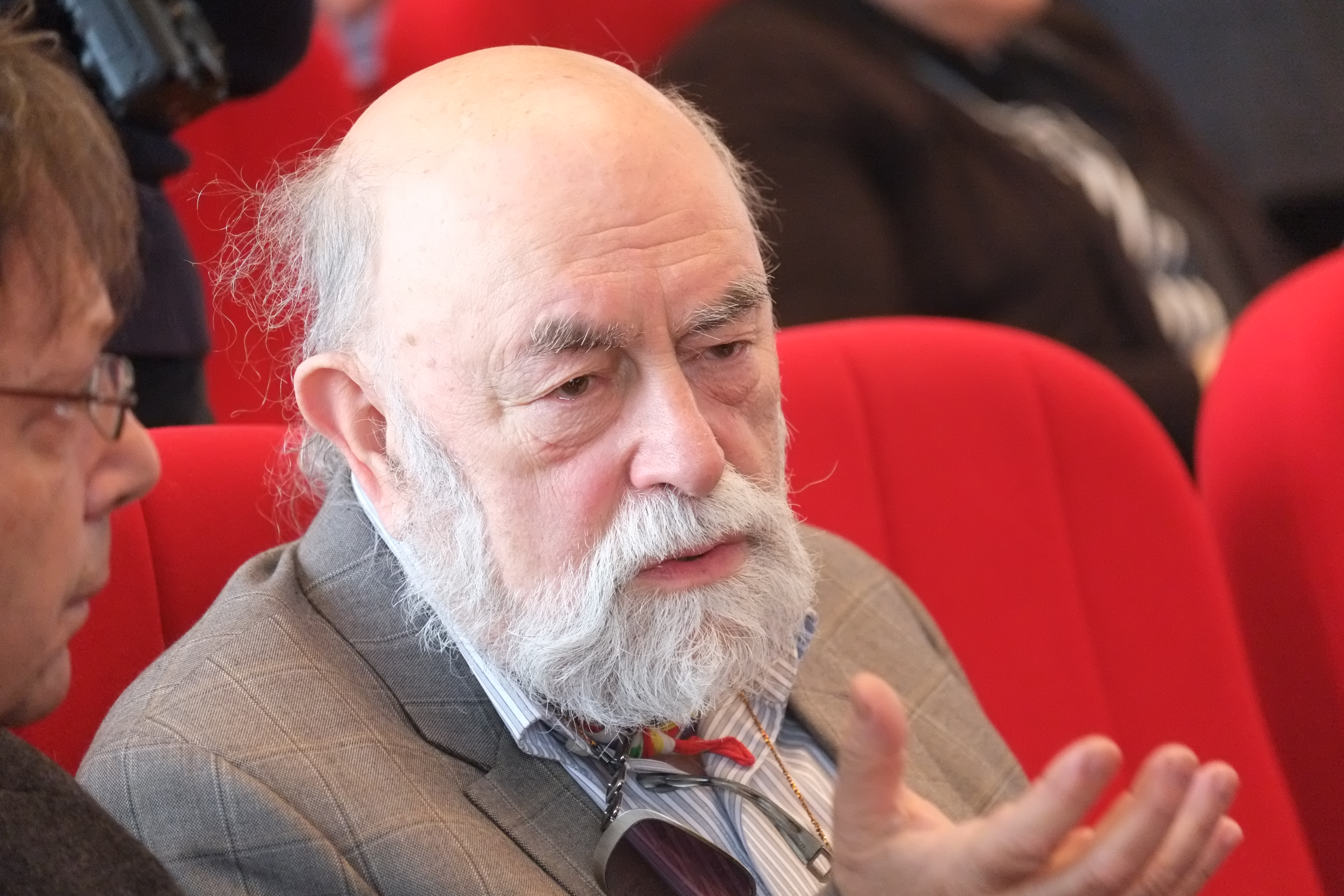
- Vershik in 2014
- Born: Anatoly Moiseevich Vershik; 28 December 1933; Leningrad, Russian SFSR, USSR
- Died: 14 February 2024 (aged 90)
- Education: Saint Petersburg State University
- Occupation: Mathematician
- Known for: Bratteli–Vershik diagram
- Awards: Fellow of the American Mathematical Society (2013); Humboldt Research Fellowship (2014)

Anatoly Moiseevich Vershik (Russian: Анато́лий Моисе́евич Ве́ршик; 28 December 1933 – 14 February 2024) was a Soviet and Russian mathematician. He is most famous for his joint work with Sergei V. Kerov on representations of infinite symmetric groups and applications to the longest increasing subsequences.

== Biography ==
Vershik studied at Leningrad State University (later renamed to Saint Petersburg State University), receiving his doctoral degree in 1974; his advisor was Vladimir Rokhlin.

Vershik worked at the St. Petersburg Department of Steklov Institute of Mathematics and at Saint Petersburg State University. In 1998–2008, he was the president of the St. Petersburg Mathematical Society.

In 2012, Vershik became a fellow of the American Mathematical Society. In 2015, he was elected a member of Academia Europaea.

His doctoral students include Alexander Barvinok, Dmitri Burago, Anna Erschler, Sergey Fomin, Vadim Kaimanovich, Sergei Kerov, Alexander N. Livshits, Andrei Lodkin, Nikolai Mnev, and Natalia Tsilevich.

He had a daughter, Estonian linguist Anna Verschik.

Anatoly Vershik died on 14 February 2024, at the age of 90.

== See also ==
- Bratteli–Vershik diagram

== Bibliography ==
- Vladimir Arnold, Mikhail Sh. Birman, Israel Gelfand, et al., "Anatolii Moiseevich Vershik (on the occasion of his sixtieth birthday", Russian Math. Surveys 49:3 (1994), 207–221.
- Anatoly Vershik, Admission to the mathematics faculty in Russia in the 1970s and 1980s, Mathematical Intelligencer vol. 16, No. 4, (1994), 4–5.
