= Approximately finite-dimensional C*-algebra =

C*-algebra

In mathematics, an approximately finite-dimensional (AF) C*-algebra is a C*-algebra that is the inductive limit of a sequence of finite-dimensional C*-algebras. Approximate finite-dimensionality was first defined and described combinatorially by Ola Bratteli. Later, George A. Elliott gave a complete classification of AF algebras using the K_{0} functor whose range consists of ordered abelian groups with sufficiently nice order structure.

The classification theorem for AF-algebras serves as a prototype for classification results for larger classes of separable simple amenable stably finite C*-algebras. Its proof divides into two parts. The invariant here is K_{0} with its natural order structure; this is a functor. First, one proves existence: a homomorphism between invariants must lift to a *-homomorphism of algebras. Second, one shows uniqueness: the lift must be unique up to approximate unitary equivalence. Classification then follows from what is known as the intertwining argument. For unital AF algebras, both existence and uniqueness follow from the fact the Murray-von Neumann semigroup of projections in an AF algebra is cancellative.

The counterpart of simple AF C*-algebras in the von Neumann algebra world are the hyperfinite factors, which were classified by Connes and Haagerup.

In the context of noncommutative geometry and topology, AF C*-algebras are noncommutative generalizations of C_{0}(X), where X is a totally disconnected metrizable space.

== Definition and basic properties ==
=== Finite-dimensional C*-algebras ===
An arbitrary finite-dimensional C*-algebra A takes the following form, up to isomorphism:

$\oplus_{k=1}^r M_{n_k},$where M_{i} denotes the full matrix algebra of i × i matrices.

Up to unitary equivalence, a unital *-homomorphism Φ : M_{i} → M_{j} is necessarily of the form

$$\Phi (a) = a \otimes I_r,$$

where r·i = j. The number r is said to be the multiplicity of Φ. In general, a unital homomorphism between finite-dimensional C*-algebras

$$\Phi: \oplus _1 ^s M_{n_k} \rightarrow \oplus _1 ^t M_{m_l}$$

is specified, up to unitary equivalence, by a t × s matrix of partial multiplicities (r_{l k}) satisfying, for all l

$$\sum_k r_{l k} n_k = m_l.\;$$

In the non-unital case, the equality is replaced by ≤. Graphically, Φ, equivalently (r_{l k}), can be represented by its Bratteli diagram. The Bratteli diagram is a directed graph with nodes corresponding to each n_{k} and m_{l} and the number of arrows from n_{k} to m_{l} is the partial multiplicity r_{lk}.

Consider the category whose objects are isomorphism classes of finite-dimensional C*-algebras and whose morphisms are *-homomorphisms modulo unitary equivalence. By the above discussion, the objects can be viewed as vectors with entries in N and morphisms are the partial multiplicity matrices.

=== AF algebras ===
A C*-algebra is AF if it is the direct limit of a sequence of finite-dimensional C*-algebras:

$$A = \varinjlim \cdots \rightarrow A_i \, \stackrel{\alpha_i}{\rightarrow} A_{i+1} \rightarrow \cdots ,$$

where each A_{i} is a finite-dimensional C*-algebra and the connecting maps α_{i} are *-homomorphisms. We will assume that each α_{i} is unital. The inductive system specifying an AF algebra is not unique. One can always drop to a subsequence. Since the quotient of finite-dimensional C*-algebra is again finite-dimensional, being AF is equivalent to having an increasing sequence of finite-dimensional C*-subalgebras whose union is dense:

$$A = \overline {\cup_n A_n}.$$

The Bratteli diagram of A is formed by the Bratteli diagrams of {α_{i}} in the obvious way. For instance, the Pascal triangle, with the nodes connected by appropriate downward arrows, is the Bratteli diagram of an AF algebra. A Bratteli diagram of the CAR algebra is given on the right. The two arrows between nodes means each connecting map is an embedding of multiplicity 2.

$$1\rightrightarrows2\rightrightarrows4\rightrightarrows8\rightrightarrows\dots$$
(A Bratteli diagram of the CAR algebra)

If an AF algebra A = (∪_{n}A_{n})^{−}, then an ideal J in A takes the form ∪_{n} (J ∩ A_{n})^{−}. In particular, J is itself an AF algebra. Given a Bratteli diagram of A and some subset S of nodes, the subdiagram generated by S gives inductive system that specifies an ideal of A. In fact, every ideal arises in this way.

Due to the presence of matrix units in the inductive sequence, AF algebras have the following local characterization: a C*-algebra A is AF if and only if A is separable and any finite subset of A is "almost contained" in some finite-dimensional C*-subalgebra.

The projections in ∪_{n}A_{n} in fact form an approximate unit of A.

It is clear that the extension of a finite-dimensional C*-algebra by another finite-dimensional C*-algebra is again finite-dimensional. More generally, the extension of an AF algebra by another AF algebra is again AF.

== Classification ==
=== K_{0} ===
The K-theoretic group K_{0} is an invariant of C*-algebras. It has its origins in topological K-theory and serves as the range of a kind of "dimension function." For an AF algebra A, K_{0}(A) can be defined as follows. Let M_{n}(A) be the C*-algebra of n × n matrices whose entries are elements of A. M_{n}(A) can be embedded into M_{n + 1}(A) canonically, into the "upper left corner". Consider the algebraic direct limit

$$M _\infty (A) = \varinjlim \cdots \rightarrow M_n(A) \rightarrow M_{n+1}(A) \rightarrow \cdots .$$

Denote the projections (self-adjoint idempotents) in this algebra by P(A). Two elements p and q are said to be Murray-von Neumann equivalent, denoted by p ~ q, if p = vv* and q = v*v for some partial isometry v in M_{∞}(A). It is clear that ~ is an equivalence relation. Define a binary operation + on the set of equivalences P(A)/~ by

$$[p] + [q] = [p \oplus q]$$

where ⊕ yields the orthogonal direct sum of two finite-dimensional matrices corresponding to p and q. While we could choose matrices of arbitrarily large dimension to stand in for p and q, our result will be equivalent regardless. This makes P(A)/~ a semigroup that has the cancellation property. We denote this semigroup by K_{0}(A)^{+}. Performing the Grothendieck group construction gives an abelian group, which is K_{0}(A).

K_{0}(A) carries a natural order structure: we say [p] ≤ [q] if p is Murray-von Neumann equivalent to a subprojection of q. This makes K_{0}(A) an ordered group whose positive cone is K_{0}(A)^{+}.

For example, for a finite-dimensional C*-algebra

$$A = \oplus _{k = 1} ^m M_{n_k},$$

one has

$$(K_0(A), K_0(A)^+) = (\mathbb{Z}^m, \mathbb{Z}_+ ^m).$$

Two essential features of the mapping A ↦ K_{0}(A) are:

1. K_{0} is a (covariant) functor. A *-homomorphism α : A → B between AF algebras induces a group homomorphism α_{*} : K_{0}(A) → K_{0}(B). In particular, when A and B are both finite-dimensional, α_{*} can be identified with the partial multiplicities matrix of α.
2. K_{0} respects direct limits. If A = ∪_{n}α_{n}(A_{n})^{−}, then K_{0}(A) is the direct limit ∪_{n}α_{n*}(K_{0}(A_{n})).

=== The dimension group ===
Since M_{∞}(M_{∞}(A)) is isomorphic to M_{∞}(A), K_{0} can only distinguish AF algebras up to stable isomorphism. For example, M_{2} and M_{4} are not isomorphic but stably isomorphic; K_{0}(M_{2}) = K_{0}(M_{4}) = Z.

A finer invariant is needed to detect isomorphism classes. For an AF algebra A, we define the scale of K_{0}(A), denoted by Γ(A), to be the subset whose elements are represented by projections in A:

$$\Gamma(A) = \{ [p] \,|\,  p^* = p^2 = p \in A \} .$$

When A is unital with unit 1_{A}, the K_{0} element [1_{A}] is the maximal element of Γ(A) and in fact,

$$\Gamma(A) = \{x \in K_0(A)\,|\, 0 \leq x \leq [1_A]\}.$$

The triple (K_{0}, K_{0}^{+}, Γ(A)) is called the dimension group of A. If A = M_{s}, its dimension group is (Z, Z^{+}, {1, 2,..., s}).

A group homomorphism between dimension group is said to be contractive if it is scale-preserving. Two dimension group are said to be isomorphic if there exists a contractive group isomorphism between them.

The dimension group retains the essential properties of K_{0}:

1. A *-homomorphism α : A → B between AF algebras in fact induces a contractive group homomorphism α_{*} on the dimension groups. When A and B are both finite-dimensional, corresponding to each partial multiplicities matrix ψ, there is a unique, up to unitary equivalence, *-homomorphism α : A → B such that α_{*} = ψ.
2. If A = ∪_{n}α_{n}(A_{n})^{−}, then the dimension group of A is the direct limit of those of A_{n}.

=== Elliott's theorem ===
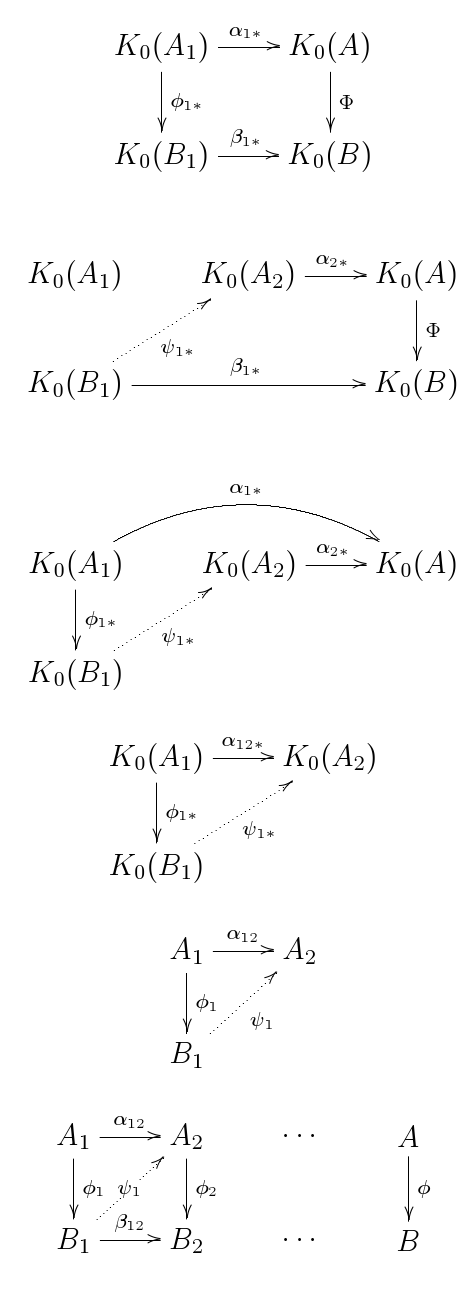
Commutative diagrams for Elliott's theorem.

Elliott's theorem says that the dimension group is a complete invariant of AF algebras: two AF algebras A and B are isomorphic if and only if their dimension groups are isomorphic.

Two preliminary facts are needed before one can sketch a proof of Elliott's theorem. The first one summarizes the above discussion on finite-dimensional C*-algebras.

Lemma For two finite-dimensional C*-algebras A and B, and a contractive homomorphism ψ: K_{0}(A) → K_{0}(B), there exists a *-homomorphism φ: A → B such that φ_{*} = ψ, and φ is unique up to unitary equivalence.

The lemma can be extended to the case where B is AF. A map ψ on the level of K_{0} can be "moved back", on the level of algebras, to some finite stage in the inductive system.

Lemma Let A be finite-dimensional and B AF, B = (∪_{n}B_{n})^{−}. Let β_{m} be the canonical homomorphism of B_{m} into B. Then for any a contractive homomorphism ψ: K_{0}(A) → K_{0}(B), there exists a *-homomorphism φ: A → B_{m} such that β_{m*} φ_{*} = ψ, and φ is unique up to unitary equivalence in B.

The proof of the lemma is based on the simple observation that K_{0}(A) is finitely generated and, since K_{0} respects direct limits, K_{0}(B) = ∪_{n} β_{n*} K_{0} (B_{n}).

Theorem (Elliott) Two AF algebras A and B are isomorphic if and only if their dimension groups (K_{0}(A), K_{0}^{+}(A), Γ(A)) and (K_{0}(B), K_{0}^{+}(B), Γ(B)) are isomorphic.

The crux of the proof has become known as Elliott's intertwining argument. Given an isomorphism between dimension groups, one constructs a diagram of commuting triangles between the direct systems of A and B by applying the second lemma.

We sketch the proof for the non-trivial part of the theorem, corresponding to the sequence of commutative diagrams on the right.

Let Φ: (K_{0}(A), K_{0}^{+}(A), Γ(A)) → (K_{0}(B), K_{0}^{+}(B), Γ(B)) be a dimension group isomorphism.

1. Consider the composition of maps Φ α_{1*} : K_{0}(A_{1}) → K_{0}(B). By the previous lemma, there exists B_{1} and a *-homomorphism φ_{1}: A_{1} → B_{1} such that the first diagram on the right commutes.
2. Same argument applied to β_{1*} Φ^{−1} shows that the second diagram commutes for some A_{2}.
3. Comparing diagrams 1 and 2 gives diagram 3.
4. Using the property of the direct limit and moving A_{2} further down if necessary, we obtain diagram 4, a commutative triangle on the level of K_{0}.
5. For finite-dimensional algebras, two *-homomorphisms induces the same map on K_{0} if and only if they are unitary equivalent. So, by composing ψ_{1} with a unitary conjugation if needed, we have a commutative triangle on the level of algebras.
6. By induction, we have a diagram of commuting triangles as indicated in the last diagram. The map φ: A → B is the direct limit of the sequence {φ_{n}}. Let ψ: B → A is the direct limit of the sequence {ψ_{n}}. It is clear that φ and ψ are mutual inverses. Therefore, A and B are isomorphic.

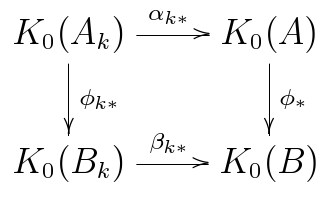

Furthermore, on the level of K_{0}, the adjacent diagram commutates for each k. By uniqueness of direct limit of maps, φ_{*} = Φ.

=== The Effros-Handelman-Shen theorem ===
The dimension group of an AF algebra is a Riesz group. The Effros-Handelman-Shen theorem says the converse is true. Every Riesz group, with a given scale, arises as the dimension group of some AF algebra. This specifies the range of the classifying functor K_{0} for AF-algebras and completes the classification.

==== Riesz groups ====
A group G with a partial order is called an ordered group. The set G^{+} of elements ≥ 0 is called the positive cone of G. One says that G is unperforated if k·g ∈ G^{+} implies g ∈ G^{+}.

The following property is called the Riesz decomposition property: if x, y_{i} ≥ 0 and x ≤ Σ y_{i}, then there exists x_{i} ≥ 0 such that x = Σ x_{i}, and x_{i} ≤ y_{i} for each i.

A Riesz group (G, G^{+}) is an ordered group that is unperforated and has the Riesz decomposition property.

It is clear that if A is finite-dimensional, (K_{0}, K_{0}^{+}) is a Riesz group, where Z^{k} is given entrywise order. The two properties of Riesz groups are preserved by direct limits, assuming the order structure on the direct limit comes from those in the inductive system. So (K_{0}, K_{0}^{+}) is a Riesz group for an AF algebra A.

A key step towards the Effros-Handelman-Shen theorem is the fact that every Riesz group is the direct limit of Z^{k} 's, each with the canonical order structure. This hinges on the following technical lemma, sometimes referred to as the Shen criterion in the literature.

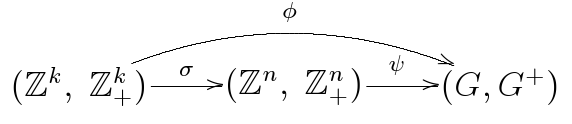
The Shen criterion.

Lemma Let (G, G^{+}) be a Riesz group, ϕ: (Z^{k}, Z^{k}_{+}) → (G, G^{+}) be a positive homomorphism. Then there exists maps σ and ψ, as indicated in the adjacent diagram, such that ker(σ) = ker(ϕ).

Corollary Every Riesz group (G, G^{+}) can be expressed as a direct limit

$$(G, G^+) = \varinjlim (\mathbb{Z}^{n_k}, \mathbb{Z}^{n_k}_+) ,$$

where all the connecting homomorphisms in the directed system on the right hand side are positive.

==== The theorem ====
Theorem If (G, G^{+}) is a countable Riesz group with scale Γ(G), then there exists an AF algebra A such that (K_{0}, K_{0}^{+}, Γ(A)) = (G, G^{+}, Γ(G)). In particular, if Γ(G) = [0, u_{G}] with maximal element u_{G}, then A is unital with [1_{A}] = [u_{G}].

Consider first the special case where Γ(G) = [0, u_{G}] with maximal element u_{G}. Suppose

$$(G, G^+) = \varinjlim (H_k, H_k^+) , \quad \mbox{where} \quad (H, H_k^+) = (\mathbb{Z}^{n_k}, \mathbb{Z}^{n_k}_+).$$

Dropping to a subsequence if necessary, let

$$\Gamma(H_1) = \{ v \in H_1^+ | \phi_1(v) \in \Gamma(G) \},$$

where φ_{1}(u_{1}) = u_{G} for some element u_{1}. Now consider the order ideal G_{1} generated by u_{1}. Because each H_{1} has the canonical order structure, G_{1} is a direct sum of Z 's (with the number of copies possible less than that in H_{1}). So this gives a finite-dimensional algebra A_{1} whose dimension group is (G_{1} G_{1}^{+}, [0, u_{1}]). Next move u_{1} forward by defining u_{2} = φ_{12}(u_{1}). Again u_{2} determines a finite-dimensional algebra A_{2}. There is a corresponding homomorphism α_{12} such that α_{12*} = φ_{12}. Induction gives a directed system

$$A = \varinjlim A_k ,$$

whose K_{0} is

$$\varinjlim (G_k, G_k^+),$$

with scale

$$\cup_k \phi_k [0, u_k] = [0, u_G].$$

This proves the special case.

A similar argument applies in general. Observe that the scale is by definition a directed set. If Γ(G) = {v_{k}}, one can choose u_{k} ∈ Γ(G) such that u_{k} ≥ v_{1} ... v_{k}. The same argument as above proves the theorem.

== Examples ==
By definition, uniformly hyperfinite algebras are AF and unital. Their dimension groups are the subgroups of Q. For example, for the 2 × 2 matrices M_{2}, K_{0}(M_{2}) is the group of rational numbers of the form a/2 for a in Z. The scale is Γ(M_{2}) = {0, 1/2, 1}. For the CAR algebra A, K_{0}(A) is the group of dyadic rationals with scale K_{0}(A) ∩ [0, 1], with 1 = [1_{A}]. All such groups are simple, in a sense appropriate for ordered groups. Thus UHF algebras are simple C*-algebras. In general, the groups which are not dense in Q are the dimension groups of M_{k} for some k.

Commutative C*-algebras, which were characterized by Gelfand, are AF precisely when the spectrum is totally disconnected. The continuous functions C(X) on the Cantor set X is one such example.

== Elliott's classification program ==
It was proposed by Elliott that other classes of C*-algebras may be classifiable by K-theoretic invariants. For a C*-algebra A, the Elliott invariant is defined to be

$$\mbox{Ell}(A) = ((K_0(A), K_0(A)^+, \Gamma(A) ), K_1(A), T^+(A), \rho_A),$$

where $T^+(A)$ is the tracial positive linear functionals in the weak-* topology, and $\rho_A$ is the natural pairing between $T^+(A)$ and $K_0(A)$.

The original conjecture by Elliott stated that the Elliott invariant classifies simple unital separable amenable C*-algebras.

In the literature, one can find several conjectures of this kind with corresponding modified/refined Elliott invariants.

== Von Neumann algebras ==
In a related context, an approximately finite-dimensional, or hyperfinite, von Neumann algebra is one with a separable predual and contains a weakly dense AF C*-algebra. Murray and von Neumann showed that, up to isomorphism, there exists a unique hyperfinite type II_{1} factor. Connes obtained the analogous result for the II_{∞} factor. Powers exhibited a family of non-isomorphic type III hyperfinite factors with cardinality of the continuum. Today we have a complete classification of hyperfinite factors.
