= Markov odometer =

In mathematics, a Markov odometer is a certain type of topological dynamical system. It plays a fundamental role in ergodic theory and especially in orbit theory of dynamical systems, since a theorem of H. Dye asserts that every ergodic nonsingular transformation is orbit-equivalent to a Markov odometer.

The basic example of such system is the "nonsingular odometer", which is an additive topological group defined on the product space of discrete spaces, induced by addition defined as $x \mapsto x+\underline{1}$, where $\underline{1}:=(1,0,0,\dots)$. This group can be endowed with the structure of a dynamical system; the result is a conservative dynamical system.

The general form, which is called "Markov odometer", can be constructed through Bratteli–Vershik diagram to define Bratteli–Vershik compactum space together with a corresponding transformation.

== Nonsingular odometers ==
Several kinds of non-singular odometers may be defined. These are sometimes referred to as adding machines. The simplest is illustrated with the Bernoulli process. This is the set of all infinite strings in two symbols, here denoted by $\Omega=\{0,1\}^{\mathbb{N}}$ endowed with the product topology. This definition extends naturally to a more general odometer defined on the product space

$$\Omega=\prod_{n\in\mathbb{N}} \left(\mathbb{Z}/k_n\mathbb{Z}\right)$$

for some sequence of integers $(k_n)$ with each $k_n\ge 2.$

The odometer for $k_n=2$ for all $n$ is termed the dyadic odometer, the von Neumann–Kakutani adding machine or the dyadic adding machine.

The topological entropy of every adding machine is zero. Any continuous map of an interval with a topological entropy of zero is topologically conjugate to an adding machine, when restricted to its action on the topologically invariant transitive set, with periodic orbits removed.

=== Dyadic odometer ===
Dyadic odometer $T$ visualized as an interval exchange transformation with the mapping $(x_1,x_2,\cdots)\mapsto\sum_{n=1}^\infty \frac{x_n}{2^n}.$

Dyadic odometer iterated twice; that is $T^2.$

Dyadic odometer thrice iterated; that is $T^3.$

Dyadic odometer iterated four times; that is $T^4.$

The set of all infinite strings in strings in two symbols $\Omega=\{0,1\}^{\mathbb{N}}$ has a natural topology, the product topology, generated by the cylinder sets. The product topology extends to a Borel sigma-algebra; let $\mathcal{B}$ denote that algebra. Individual points $x\in\Omega$ are denoted as $x=(x_1,x_2,x_3,\cdots).$

The Bernoulli process is conventionally endowed with a collection of measures, the Bernoulli measures, given by $\mu_p(x_n=1)=p$ and $\mu_p(x_n=0)=1-p$, for some $0<p<1$ independent of $n$. The value of $p=1/2$ is rather special; it corresponds to the special case of the Haar measure, when $\Omega$ is viewed as a compact Abelian group. Note that the Bernoulli measure is not the same as the 2-adic measure on the dyadic integers! Formally, one can observe that $\Omega$ is also the base space for the dyadic integers; however, the dyadic integers are endowed with a metric, the p-adic metric, which induces a metric topology distinct from the product topology used here.

The space $\Omega$ can be endowed with addition, defined as coordinate addition, with a carry bit. That is, for each coordinate, let $(x+y)_n=x_n+y_n+\varepsilon_n\,\bmod\,2$ where $\varepsilon_0=0$ and

$$\varepsilon_n=\begin{cases}
0 & x_{n-1}+y_{n-1}<2\\
1 & x_{n-1}+y_{n-1}=2
\end{cases}$$

inductively. Increment-by-one is then called the (dyadic) odometer. It is the transformation $T:\Omega\to\Omega$ given by $T(x)=x+\underline{1}$, where $\underline{1}:=(1,0,0,\dots)$. It is called the odometer due to how it looks when it "rolls over": $T$ is the transformation $T\left(1,\dots,1,0,x_{k+1},x_{k+2},\dots\right) = \left(0,\dots,0,1,x_{k+1},x_{k+2},\dots \right)$. Note that $T^{-1}(0,0,\cdots)=(1,1,\cdots)$ and that $T$ is $\mathcal{B}$-measurable, that is, $T^{-1}(\sigma)\in\mathcal{B}$ for all $\sigma\in\mathcal{B}.$

The transformation $T$ is non-singular for every $\mu_p$. Recall that a measurable transformation $\tau:\Omega\to\Omega$ is non-singular when, given $\sigma\in\mathcal{B}$, one has that $\mu(\tau^{-1}\sigma)=0$ if and only if $\mu(\sigma)=0$. In this case, one finds

$$\frac{d \mu_p \circ T}{d \mu_p} = \left(\frac{1-p} p\right)^\varphi$$

where $\varphi(x)=\min\left\{ n\in\mathbb{N}\mid x_n = 0 \right\}-2$. Hence $T$ is nonsingular with respect to $\mu_p$.

The transformation $T$ is ergodic. This follows because, for every $x \in \Omega$ and natural number $n$, the orbit of $x$ under $T^0,T^1,\cdots,T^{2^n-1}$ is the set $\{0,1\}^n$. This in turn implies that $T$ is conservative, since every invertible ergodic nonsingular transformation in a nonatomic space is conservative.

Note that for the special case of $p=1/2$, that $\left(\Omega,\mathcal{B},\mu_{1/2},T\right)$ is a measure-preserving dynamical system.

=== Integer odometers ===
The same construction enables to define such a system for every product of discrete spaces. In general, one writes

$$\Omega=\prod_{n\in\mathbb{N}}A_{n}$$

for $A_n=\mathbb{Z}/m_n\mathbb{Z}=\{ 0,1,\dots,m_n-1\}$ with $m_n\ge2$ an integer. The product topology extends naturally to the product Borel sigma-algebra $\mathcal{B}$ on $\Omega$. A product measure on $\mathcal{B}$ is conventionally defined as $\textstyle\mu=\prod_{n\in\mathbb{N}}\mu_{n},$ given some measure $\mu_n$ on $A_n$. The corresponding map is defined by

$$T(x_1,\dots,x_k,x_{k+1},x_{k+2},\dots)=(0,\dots,0,x_k+1,x_{k+1},x_{k+2},\dots)$$

where $k$ is the smallest index for which $x_k \neq m_k-1$. This is again a topological group.

A special case of this is the Ornstein odometer, which is defined on the space

$$\Omega=\left(\mathbb{Z}/2\mathbb{Z}\right)\times \left(\mathbb{Z}/3\mathbb{Z}\right)\times \left(\mathbb{Z}/4\mathbb{Z}\right)\times \cdots$$

with the measure a product of

$$\mu_n(j)=\begin{cases}
1/2 & \mbox{ if } j=0 \\
1/2(n+1) & \mbox{ if } j\ne 0 \\
\end{cases}$$

== Sandpile model ==
A concept closely related to the conservative odometer is that of the abelian sandpile model. This model replaces the directed linear sequence of finite groups constructed above by an undirected graph $(V,E)$ of vertexes and edges. At each vertex $v\in V$ one places a finite group $\mathbb{Z}/n\mathbb{Z}$ with $n=deg(v)$ the degree of the vertex $v$. Transition functions are defined by the graph Laplacian. That is, one can increment any given vertex by one; when incrementing the largest group element (so that it increments back down to zero), each of the neighboring vertexes are incremented by one.

Sandpile models differ from the above definition of a conservative odometer in three different ways. First, in general, there is no unique vertex singled out as the starting vertex, whereas in the above, the first vertex is the starting vertex; it is the one that is incremented by the transition function. Next, the sandpile models in general use undirected edges, so that the wrapping of the odometer redistributes in all directions. A third difference is that sandpile models are usually not taken on an infinite graph, and that rather, there is one special vertex singled out, the "sink", which absorbs all increments and never wraps. The sink is equivalent to cutting away the infinite parts of an infinite graph, and replacing them by the sink; alternately, as ignoring all changes past that termination point.

== Markov odometer ==
Let $B=(V,E)$ be an ordered Bratteli–Vershik diagram, consists on a set of vertices of the form $\textstyle\coprod_{n\in\mathbb{N}}V^{(n)}$ (disjoint union) where $V^0$ is a singleton and on a set of edges $\textstyle\coprod_{n\in\mathbb{N}}E^{(n)}$ (disjoint union).

The diagram includes source surjection-mappings $s_n:E^{(n)} \to V^{(n-1)}$ and range surjection-mappings $r_n:E^{(n)} \to V^{(n)}$. We assume that $e,e' \in E^{(n)}$ are comparable if and only if $r_n(e) = r_n(e')$.

For such diagram we look at the product space $\textstyle E:=\prod_{n\in\mathbb{N}}E^{(n)}$ equipped with the product topology. Define "Bratteli–Vershik compactum" to be the subspace of infinite paths,

$$X_{B}:=\left\{ x=(x_n)_{n\in\mathbb{N}} \in E\mid x_n\in E^{(n)}\text{ and } r (x_n) = s(x_{n+1}) \right\}$$

Assume there exists only one infinite path $x_{\max} = (x_n)_{n \in \mathbb{N}}$ for which each $x_n$ is maximal and similarly one infinite path $x_{\text{min}}$. Define the "Bratteli-Vershik map" $T_B:X_B \to X_B$ by $T( x_{\max}) = x_{\min}$ and, for any $x = (x_n)_{n\in \mathbb{N}} \neq x_{\max}$ define $T_B(x_1,\dots,x_k,x_{k+1},\dots)=(y_1,\dots,y_k,x_{k+1},\dots)$, where $k$ is the first index for which $x_k$ is not maximal and accordingly let $(y_1,\dots,y_k)$ be the unique path for which $y_1,\dots,y_{k-1}$ are all maximal and $y_k$ is the successor of $x_k$. Then $T_B$ is homeomorphism of $X_B$.

Let $P=\left(P^{(1)},P^{(2)},\dots \right)$ be a sequence of stochastic matrices $P^{(n)}=\left(p^{(n)}_{(v,e) \in V^{n-1} \times E^(n)}\right)$ such that $p^{(n)}_{v,e} > 0$ if and only if $v=s_n(e)$. Define "Markov measure" on the cylinders of $X_B$ by $\mu_P ([e_1,\dots,e_n]) = p^{(1)}_{s_1(e_1),e_1}\cdots p^{(n)}_{s_n(e_n),e_n}$. Then the system $\left(X_B, \mathcal{B}, \mu_P, T_B \right)$ is called a "Markov odometer".

One can show that the nonsingular odometer is a Markov odometer where all the $V^{(n)}$ are singletons.

== See also ==
- Abelian sandpile model
