= Proto-Balto-Slavic language =

Reconstructed proto-language

Proto-Balto-Slavic
- PBS, PBSl
- Reconstruction of: Balto-Slavic languages
- Region: Central Europe, Eastern Europe
- Era: 2000 BC – c. 800 BC
- Reconstructed ancestor: Proto-Indo-European
- Lower-order reconstructions: Proto-Baltic; Proto-Slavic

Proto-Balto-Slavic (PBS or PBSl) is a reconstructed proto-language descending from Proto-Indo-European (PIE). From Proto-Balto-Slavic, the later Balto-Slavic languages are thought to have developed, composed of the Baltic and Slavic sub-branches, and including modern Latvian, Lithuanian, Polish, Russian and Serbo-Croatian, among others.

Like most other proto-languages, it is not attested by any surviving texts but has been reconstructed using the comparative method. There are several isoglosses that Baltic and Slavic languages share in phonology, morphology and accentology, which represent common innovations from Proto-Indo-European times and can be chronologically arranged.

== Dating ==
According to linguist Tijmen Pronk, the period of Balto-Slavic linguistic unity may have extended for as long as 1,500 years, from the earliest post-Proto-Indo-European stages to the early 2nd millennium BC, after which the Baltic and Slavic branches developed independently. He considers it plausible to associate Proto-Balto-Slavic with the early phases of the Middle Dnieper culture (ca. 2500–1800 BC).

Pronk further observes that, during the Proto-Balto-Slavic period (3rd millennium BCE), no substantial period of shared innovations with either Germanic or Indo-Iranian can be established, suggesting that Proto-Balto-Slavic speakers had already become geographically separated from the ancestors of those groups following the breakup of Proto-Indo-European. Linguist Frederik Kortlandt also argues that the substantial body of shared vocabulary between Germanic and Balto-Slavic languages consists largely of borrowings that postdate the Baltic–Slavic split and appear to date to the early Middle Ages. On this basis, he maintains that Germanic and Proto-Balto-Slavic cannot have formed contiguous Indo-European dialects.

== Phonology ==
=== Consonants ===
Proto-Indo-European voiced aspirated stops lost their aspiration in Proto-Balto-Slavic. Stops were no longer distinguished between fortis and aspirated but were voiceless and voiced. However, several new palatal consonants had developed: *ś and *ź from earlier palatovelar plosives and *š from *s as a result of the ruki sound law.

Proto-Balto-Slavic consonants
	Labial		Coronal		Palatal		Velar	
Nasal	m [m]		n [n]					
Plosive	p [p]	b [b]	t [t]	d [d]			k [k]	g [ɡ]
Fricative			s [s]	(z [z])	ś [ɕ], š [ʂ]	ź [ʑ]		
Trill			r [r]					
Lateral			l [l]					
Approximant	w [w]				j [j]			

- [z] surfaced as an allophone of /s/ before a voiced consonant in Proto-Balto-Slavic.

=== Vowels ===
Proto-Balto-Slavic preserved much of the late Proto-Indo-European vowel system. Short *o was merged into *a.

Proto-Balto-Slavic vowels
	Short		Long		Diphthong	
	Front	Back	Front	Back	Front	Back
Close	i [i]	u [u]	ī [iː]	ū [uː]		
Mid	e [e]		ē [eː]	ō [oː]	ei [ei̯]	eu [eu̯]
Open		a [a]		ā [aː]	ai [ai̯]	au [au̯]

Proto-Balto-Slavic also possessed "sonorant diphthongs", consisting of a short vowel followed by *l, *m, *n or *r. These were inherited from Proto-Indo-European, and formed anew from PIE syllabic sonorants. Although not diphthongs in the traditional sense, they behaved as a single syllable nucleus in Proto-Balto-Slavic, and could bear the acute like long vowels and regular diphthongs.

	-l	-m	-n	-r
a-	al	am	an	ar
e-	el	em	en	er
i-	il	im	in	ir
u-	ul	um	un	ur

=== Accent ===
Most Proto-Balto-Slavic words could be accented on any syllable, as in Proto-Indo-European. The placement of the accent was changed significantly relative to PIE, with much paradigmatic leveling of the mobile PIE accent, along with leftward and rightward shifts conditioned by the surrounding phonemes. There is still some disagreement among linguists on the exact position of the accent in each Proto-Balto-Slavic form, and the rules governing these changes.

=== Acute ===
Some syllables in Proto-Balto-Slavic had an additional distinguishing feature, known as acuteness. It is primarily a reflex of the Proto-Indo-European laryngeals, as well as a result of Winter's law. The exact nature of the acute is not clear, and different linguists have different interpretations of it.

The modern interpretation, favoured by an increasing number of linguists, is that the acute was realised as glottalisation, an interruption of voicing similar to the stød found in Danish. This glottalisation is still found in modern Samogitian and Latvian, under the term "broken tone". Olander indicates it with a superscript glottalisation symbol ˀ after the nucleus of the syllable, while Jasanoff is more noncommittal and uses underlining. Some linguists go further, and interpret the acute as an actual consonantal segment, which Derksen indicates as a glottal stop ʔ and Kortlandt as a laryngeal consonant H. They reconstruct this consonantal segment not just after vowels, but also before them, as direct reflexes of PIE laryngeals. Such consonantal reflexes of laryngeals are not widely accepted, however. For consistency, Olander's glottalisation symbol ˀ will be used in this article.

In Proto-Balto-Slavic, the acute was independent of accent position, and could appear on any "long" syllable, which included:

- Syllables with long vowels. They could be original PIE long vowels or vowels that were lengthened by a following laryngeal.
- Syllables with vocalic diphthongs (*ei, *ai, *au).
- Syllables with sonorant diphthongs, which consisted of short vowel followed by *l, *m, *n or *r.

Thus, any syllable was either long with acute, long without acute or short. Syllables without acute are sometimes collectively termed "circumflex", although this term is also used specifically for long syllables lacking the acute. Within an inflectional paradigm, a long syllable could become short if the nucleus was immediately followed by an inflectional ending beginning with a vowel. This, in turn, resulted in the loss of the acute, as the acute was not permitted on short syllables. Such alternations were found in consonant stem nouns and in primary verbs.

No modern language retains the original Balto-Slavic distribution of the acute. In Lithuanian and Slavic, the acute distinction was lost on unaccented syllables and converted to an intonation distinction. This happened relatively late and not before some important accentual changes occurred, such as Fortunatov–de Saussure's law and Dybo's law. In Latvian, the acute is reflected as the glottalised "broken tone" in words that originally had mobile accentuation.

=== Alternations ===
Proto-Balto-Slavic retained the system of ablaut from its parent language, but it was far less productive and had been significantly reworked. Vowel alternations were often leveled, but it is not always easy to determine how far this leveling had progressed by the time the Balto-Slavic dialects began to diverge, as the leveling progressed along the same lines in all of them to some degree.

The lengthened grade remained productive in word derivation and was used in many innovative formations that were not present in Proto-Indo-European. After the merger of *o and *a, the resulting phoneme *a could lengthen to both *ā and *ō.

Pre-Proto-Slavic retained many such uses of lengthened grades in morphology. The length distinctions are reflected as vowel quality distinctions in Late Common Slavic (LCS) and the later Slavic languages:

- Proto-Balto-Slavic *ślṓˀwāˀ > Early Proto-Slavic *slāwā "fame, glory" > Late Proto-Slavic *slava vs. Proto-Balto-Slavic *ślawas > Early Proto-Slavic *slawa "word" > Late Proto-Slavic *slovo
- Proto-Balto-Slavic *twāris > Early Proto-Slavic *twāri "substance" > Late Proto-Slavic *tvarь vs. Proto-Balto-Slavic *twárīˀtei > Early Proto-Slavic *twarītei "to form, create" > Late Proto-Slavic *tvoriti)

These are similar examples in Lithuanian:

- Lithuanian prõtas "intellect, mind" (< *prātas) vs. pràsti "to understand"
- Lithuanian gė̃ris "goodness" (< *gēris) vs. gẽras "good"

On the basis of the existing length alternations inherited from Proto-Indo-European, new alternations arose between the long *ī, *ū and the short *i, *u. This latter type of apophony was not productive in PIE. Compare:

- Lithuanian mū̃šis "battle" versus mùšti "to kill, hit"
- Lithuanian lỹkis "remainder" versus lìkti "to stay, keep"

The new type of apophonic length was especially used in Pre-Proto-Slavic in the formation of durative, iterative and imperfective verbs. Compare:

- Proto-Balto-Slavic *dírāˀtei > Early Proto-Slavic *dirātei "to tear (perfective)" > Late Proto-Slavic dьrati) vs. Early Proto-Slavic *arz-dīrātei ("to tear (imperfective)") > Late Proto-Slavic *orzdirati > OCS razdirati
- Proto-Balto-Slavic *bírāˀtei > Early Proto-Slavic *birātei "to pick" > Late Proto-Slavic bьrati) vs. Early Proto-Slavic *bīrātei "to choose" > Late Proto-Slavic *birati

Certain pairs of words show a change of older initial *a- (from PIE *(H)a-, *(H)o-, *h₂e-, *h₃e-) to *e-, which is sometimes called "Rozwadowski's rule". The exact conditioning of this change is currently not well understood, but led to alternations between *e- and *a- in related words or even as alternative forms of the same word. The alternations often gave rise to different initial vowels in different languages. Several words retained the alternation into Proto-Slavic times as well, which became an alternation between *(j)e- and *o-:

- Proto-Balto-Slavic *elawa/*alawa "lead" > Bulgarian (dial.) élavo, Polish ołów, Russian ólovo "tin", Old Prussian elwas ~ alwis.
- Proto-Balto-Slavic *éźera/*áźera "lake" > Bulgarian ézero, ézer (dial.), Polish jezioro, Latvian ezers, Lithuanian ẽžeras; Russian ózero, Old Prussian assaran, Latgalian azars.

== Development from Proto-Indo-European ==
Austrian Balto-Slavist Georg Holzer has reconstructed a relative chronology of 50 Balto-Slavic sound changes, referring only to phonology, not to accentuation, from Proto-Balto-Slavic down to the modern daughter languages. However, only the first 12 are Common Balto-Slavic and so relevant for this article (only Winter's law is a unique common change):

1. Ruki law: *s > *š after *r, *u, *k or *i.
2. Laryngeals are lost between consonants in non-initial syllables.
3. Winter's law: short vowels are lengthened when followed by a nonaspirated voiced stop (in some accounts, only in a closed syllable).
4. *o > *a.
5. Aspirated voiced stops lose their aspiration and merge with the plain voiced stops.
6. Labiovelar stops lose their labialization and merge with the plain velars.
7. Satemization: *ḱ, *ǵ > *ś, *ź.
8. *ewV > *awV.
9. *i (sometimes *u) is inserted before syllabic sonorants, creating new liquid diphthongs.
10. *wl, *wr > *l, *r word-initially.
11. Two dentals next to each other become *st.

Pre-Indo-European substrate is likely absent from Proto-Balto-Slavic (or present only in very small amounts).

=== Satemization ===
Proto-Balto-Slavic generally shows Satem reflexes of the three velar series: labiovelars merge into the plain velars while palatovelars develop into sibilants (*ś and *ź).

There are a number of words in Balto-Slavic that show Centum reflexes instead, with palatovelars appearing as plain velars. A number can be explained by regular sound laws, but some laws have been obscured by numerous analogical developments. Others are argued to be borrowings from Centum languages.

For example, Proto-Balto-Slavic *kárˀwāˀ 'cow' (Lithuanian kárvė, OCS krava, Russian koróva) is likely a feminine derivation of a lost masculine noun that may have been borrowed from Proto-Celtic *karwos "deer" (Welsh carw, Breton karv, Cornish karow), which in turn is a regular reflex of PIE *ḱr̥h₂wos.

PIE palatovelars could also depalatalize in Balto-Slavic. Several depalatalization rules for Balto-Slavic have been proposed. According to Matasović, the depalatalization of palatovelars occurred before sonorant followed by a back vowel: Ḱ > K/_RV^{back}. That would explain Centum reflexes such as these ones:

- Lithuanian akmuõ, Latvian akmens and Late Proto-Slavic kamy would have regular /k/ from Proto-Balto-Slavic *akmō as opposed to Sanskrit áśmā < PIE *h₂éḱmō "stone".
- Late Proto-Slavic svekry < Proto-Balto-Slavic *swekrūˀ < PIE *sweḱrúh₂ "mother-in-law".
- Old Prussian balgnan < Proto-Balto-Slavic *balgna < PIE *bʰolǵʰnom "saddle".

Another view is that satemization occurred in Baltic and Slavic independently after Slavic had split off.

=== Ruki law ===
PIE *s was preserved in Balto-Slavic in most positions. According to the Ruki law, it became *š when it was preceded by *r, *u, *k or *i. It also included diphthongs ending in *u or *i, the long vowels *ū and *ī (whether original or from a following laryngeal), and the voiced velar *g.

Among the Balto-Slavic languages, the evidence of Ruki law is recognizable only in Lithuanian and Slavic because in the other languages *š, *ś and *s all merge into plain *s. In Lithuanian, *š and *ś are merged to *š instead, remaining distinct from *s. In Slavic, *ś merges with s but *š remains distinct (and becomes *x before back vowels).

Most handbooks, on the basis of Lithuanian material, state that in Baltic Ruki law has been applied only partially. The most common claim is that the law applied unconditionally in Lithuanian only after *r, while after *u, *k and *i, both *s and *š occur. Compare:

- Lithuanian aušrà "dawn" < Proto-Balto-Slavic *aušrāˀ < PIE *h₂éwsreh₂ (compare Latin aurōra, Sanskrit uṣás), with RUKI applied.
- Lithuanian ausìs "ear" < Pre-Lithuanian *ausis < PIE *h₂éwsis (compare Latin auris) reflects *s while Slavic *uxo < Pre-Slavic *auš- reflects *š instead.
- Lithuanian maĩšas "sack" < Proto-Balto-Slavic *maišás < PIE *moysós (compare Sanskrit meṣá) reflects *š, matching Slavic *měxъ.
- Lithuanian teisùs < Pre-Lithuanian *teisus reflects *s while Slavic *tixъ < Pre-Slavic *teišus reflects *š.

There is no simple solution to such double reflexes of the Ruki law in Lithuanian and thus no simple answer to the question of whether Ruki law is a common Balto-Slavic isogloss or not. The most probable answer seems to be the assumption that PIE *s was changed to *š after *r, *u, *k, *i completely regularly within Balto-Slavic proper, but the traces of the effect of RUKI law were erased by subsequent changes in Lithuanian such as the change of word-final *-š to *-s.

Generally, it can be ascertained that Lithuanian shows the effect of Ruki law only in old words inherited from Balto-Slavic period so Lithuanian š appears in words that have a complete formational and morphological correspondence in Slavic (ruling out the possibility of accidental, parallel formations).

It appears that palatovelars yielded fricatives in Proto-Balto-Slavic before the effect of RUKI law, so that *ḱs appears simply as *ś. Compare:

- Late Proto-Slavic *desnъ "right (i.e. opposite to left)" (OCS desnъ, Russian désnyj, Serbo-Croatian dèsnī), Lithuanian dẽšinas < Proto-Balto-Slavic *deśinas < PIE *déḱsinos (Latin dexter, Sanskrit dákṣiṇa)
- Late Proto-Slavic *osь "axle, axis" (OCS osь, Russ. os’, SCr. ȏs), Lithuanian ašis < Proto-Balto-Slavic *aśís < PIE *h₂éḱsis (Latin axis, Sanskrit ákṣas)

=== Accentual mobility ===
Both Proto-Indo-European and Proto-Balto-Slavic had systems of accentual mobility, in which the accent would be placed on different syllables in different inflections of the same word. The systems of the two languages are vastly different in detail, however. PIE mobility and Balto-Slavic mobility are unconnected; Balto-Slavic mobility is not inherited from Proto-Indo-European, but formed entirely anew. PIE mobility was entirely lost in the early stages of Proto-Balto-Slavic, by eliminating the accentual distinction between "strong" and "weak" forms (accented further to the left and right, respectively), usually in favour of the weak forms, i.e. accent on the suffix syllable for proterokinetic stems. Hysterokinetic stems already effectively had fixed accent on the first syllable after the root, and retained this. Amphikinetic stems joined this pattern.

The exact process by which the new Balto-Slavic type of mobility arose is still a hotly debated topic, although some details are clear. As a general rule, nouns that had the accent on the ending ("oxytones") became mobile, while those that had accent on the root ("barytones") retained their fixed accent. Words with mobile accent had accent on the leftmost syllable of the stem in some forms, accent on the rightmost syllable of the ending in others (modified by Hirt's law). A special case is formed, however, by oxytone neuter o-stems, which under some conditions appear as AP b in Slavic instead of the expected AP c.

The following sections lay out the explanations for mobility given by various linguists. The explanations are very different in nature, and sometimes also give different results for different cases. The "incorrect" outcomes are in turn explained by each in their own way.

==== Jasanoff ====
J. Jasanoff proposes three rules explaining the rise of mobility:

1. Saussure-Pedersen's law: The accent was retracted one syllable to the left from a word-internal short open syllable. If the accent came onto an initial syllable, it received a special "left-marginal" accent contour.
2. Final *-V̆N(C) retraction: The accent was also retracted from a final syllable containing a short vowel and ending in a nasal, optionally with another consonant.
3. Proto-Vasilev-Dolobko's law (Proto-VDL): In phonological words of four or more syllables headed by a left-marginal accent, the final syllable acquired a lexical accent and the left-marginal accent was lost.

After these changes, analogical changes took place. The mobility pattern of prefixed verbs was extended to unprefixed verbs. The final accent of nouns with two syllables before the ending (resulting from Proto-VDL) was extended to nouns with one syllable before the ending, e.g. regular *su᷅Hnumos → analogical *suHnumo̍s > Proto-Balto-Slavic *sūˀnumás based on regular *golHwinomo̍s.

The nom/acc/voc singular of oxytone neuter o-stems received a left-marginal accent through these changes, which was retained as a falling tone in Slavic AP c neuters. The anomalous AP b neuters can be explained as remnants of suppletive patterns of PIE oxytone singulars and barytone collective plurals. As barytones, these collective plurals would have ended up with a lexical accent on the root, contrasting with a left-marginal accent in the singular forms. Eventually, the lexical accent appears to have "won out", perhaps in part due to the frequent use of the plural in these nouns.

==== Kortlandt and Derksen ====
In the proposal of Kortlandt, supported by Derksen, four changes create the new Balto-Slavic mobility:

1. Pedersen's law: The accent was retracted from medial syllables in stems that remained "mobile", i.e. in hysterokinetic and amphikinetic consonant stems, in which the accent sometimes fell on the suffix and sometimes on the ending. For example, accusative singular *dʰugh₂-tér-m̥ (~ *dʰugh₂-tr-és) > *dʰúgh₂-ter-m̥ > Proto-Balto-Slavic *dúkterin.
2. Barytonesis: The retraction of the accent spread analogically to vocalic stems in the case forms where Pedersen's law applied. Thus, acc. sg. *suHnúm > *súHnum > Proto-Balto-Slavic *sū́ˀnun.
3. Oxytonesis: The accent shifted from a medial syllable to the end of the word in paradigms with end-accented forms. This shifted the accent to the last syllable of multisyllabic endings.
4. Late Balto-Slavic retraction: In two-syllable words, the accent was retracted from a word-final vowel unless the first syllable ended in an obstruent (including laryngeals).

Step 4 caused retraction in the nom/acc/voc singular of oxytone neuter o-stems, where the ending had been replaced with the pronominal *-od, followed by loss of the final *-d which put the vowel in final position. However, because it was blocked by an obstruent-final first syllable, a split occurred in this class of nouns: the retracted stems eventually joined AP c in Slavic, while the unretracted stems joined AP b.

==== Olander ====
Olander's "mobility law" presupposes some conditions, namely:

- Accented short vowels had one mora, which was accented.
- Accented long vowels (whether inherited or from laryngeals) had two moras, with accent on the first.
- Accented hiatal long vowels (i.e. V́HV) had two moras, with accent on the second.

The mobility law itself then states that the accent was deleted if it fell on the last mora of a word, and the word became inherently unaccented. Such words appeared with a default accent on the leftmost mora of the word.

==== Moscow accentological school ====
The Moscow accentological school considers the Proto-Balto-Slavic mobile accent paradigm to be a direct reflex of recessive Proto-Indo-European platforms:

- Proto-Indo-European *médʰu r-r → Proto-Balto-Slavic *mȅdu r-r → Proto-Slavic *mȅdъ (AP c), cf. Ancient Greek méthu r-r, Vedic mádhu r-r.
- Proto-Indo-European *suHnús r-sd → (Hirt's law) Proto-Balto-Slavic *sū́nus sd-sd (alignment of the accent curve) → Old Lithuanian súnus (AP 1) or Proto-Slavic *sy̑nъ (AP c), Lithuanian sūnùs (AP 3); cf. Vedic sūnúṣ r-sd.

=== Hirt's law ===
Hirt's law caused the accent to retract to the previous syllable if the vowel in the preceding syllable was immediately followed by a laryngeal. It took place before the addition of epenthetic vowels before syllabic sonorants, so at the time of the change, syllabic sonorants still acted as a vocalic nucleus like the true vowels and could attract the accent as well.

Hirt's law took place after the creation of new accentual mobility, and served to modify it. Where endings of mobile-accented words had multiple syllables, it could shift the accent from the final syllable onto the preceding one, thus creating the non-final accent of Slavic *-ìti (infinitive) and *-àxъ (locative plural). If the accent was shifted from the ending of a mobile-accent word onto the stem, the word was usually converted to a fixed-accent pattern:

- Pre-Balto-Slavic *duHmós "smoke" > (by Hirt's law, then conversion to fixed accent) *dúHmos > Proto-Balto-Slavic *dū́ˀmas > Lithuanian dū́mas (AP 1), Late Common Slavic *dỳmъ (AP a)
- Pre-Balto-Slavic *griHwáH "?" > (by Hirt's law, then conversion to fixed accent) *gríHwaH > Proto-Balto-Slavic *grī́ˀwāˀ > Latvian grĩva, Late Common Slavic *grìva (AP a)

However, in some cases, Hirt's law does not appear to have taken place where it would be expected, and the words remain mobile-accented:

- Pre-Balto-Slavic *suHnús "son" > Proto-Balto-Slavic *sūˀnús > Lithuanian sūnùs (AP 3), Late Common Slavic *sy̑nъ (AP c)
- Pre-Balto-Slavic *giHwós "alive" > Proto-Balto-Slavic *gīˀwás > Lithuanian gývas (AP 3), Late Common Slavic *žȋvъ (AP c)

=== Syllabic sonorants ===
The Proto-Indo-European syllabic sonorants *l̥, *r̥, *m̥ and *n̥ (abbreviated *R̥) developed a prothetic vowel in front of them, converting them into "sonorant diphthongs". This change occurred after Hirt's law, which operated on original syllabic sonorants but not on sonorant diphthongs.

Both *i and *u appear as prothetic vowels, yielding reflexes *im, *in, *ir, *il (*iR) and *um, *un, *ur, *ul (*uR). It has remained an unsolved problem to this day as to the exact phonological conditions that trigger which reflex. Regardless, analysis of their distribution has shown that *i appears much more often, suggesting that it is the default reflex, with *u appearing only in special cases. In a sample of 215 Balto-Slavic lexical items, 36 (17%) are attested only with *uR reflexes, 22 (10%) with both reflexes in the same language or branch or with one in Slavic and the other in Baltic, and the remaining 157 (73%) are attested only with *iR reflex.

Several theories have been proposed, the most notable being the one by André Vaillant from 1950. According to him, *u arose after PIE labiovelars. If true, it would be the only trace of PIE labiovelars in Balto-Slavic.

After surveying Reinhold Trautmann's 1924 Balto-Slavic dictionary, Jerzy Kuryłowicz in 1956 found no phonologically consistent distribution for the dual reflexes except in a single position: after PIE palatovelars Baltic and Slavic have only *iR reflex.

George Shevelov in 1965 inspected Slavic data in much detail, but in the end, he demonstrated only that the distribution of the dual reflexes in Slavic is not reducible to phonological conditioning.

According to an analysis by Christian Stang in 1966 Kuryłowicz's statistics proved only that *iR reflexes are much more frequent than *uR reflexes. Stang made several important observations:

- Balto-Slavic grammatical morphemes have *iR reflexes, but no *uR reflexes
- *iR reflexes are productive in ablaut alternations, while *uR are not
- many words containing *uR diphthongs have an expressive meaning, meaning (i) "fat", "dumb", "lazy", "clumsy", (ii) "crooked, bent", (iii) "crippled, decrepit", (iv) "dark", "dirty", or (v) they are of onomatopoeic origin. Such words could have been innovated at various times during the prehistory and have no relation to the Balto-Slavic reflexes of PIE *R̥. Such u + sonorant combinations reflect a universal semantic category; compare English plump, dumb, bungle, bulky, clumsy, glum, dumpy etc.; German dumm, dumpf, dunkel, krumm, plump, stumm, stumpf, etc.

Stang's analysis indicates that *iR was the regular result of the diphthongization of PIE syllabic sonorants. Doublets with expressive meaning are then explained as expressively motivated *uR replacements of the original *iR reflex, or as borrowings from substratum dialects (such as Germanic) that regularly had the *R̥ > *uR reflex, when (pre-)Balto-Slavic no longer had syllabic sonorants and were then used side by side with the original reflex.

According to Jānis Endzelīns and Reinhold Trautmann *uR reflex resulted in zero-grade of morphemes that had PIE *o (> Balto-Slavic *a) in normal grade.

Matasović, in 2008, proposed the following rules:

1. At first, syllabic sonorants develop a prothetic schwa: *R̥ > *əR.
2. *ə > *i in a final syllable.
3. *ə > *u after velars and before nasals.
4. *ə > *i otherwise.

=== Laryngeals and the acute ===
According to the traditional school, laryngeals disappeared as independent phonemes. Some linguists of the Leiden school, in particular Derksen and Kortlandt, reconstruct a glottal or laryngeal consonant for Proto-Balto-Slavic, as a direct reflex of original laryngeals. The remainder of this section thus only applies if one does not follow that idea.

Like in almost all Indo-European branches, laryngeals in the syllable onset were lost, as were all word-initial laryngeals. Laryngeals between consonants disappeared as well, but in the first syllable, they are reflected as *a. Compare:

- PIE *h₁rh̥₃déh₂ "heron, stork" (Ancient Greek erōdiós, Latin ardea) > Proto-Balto-Slavic *radāˀ > Slavic *roda (Serbo-Croatian róda).
- PIE *sh̥₂l- (oblique case stem of *seh₂ls "salt") > Proto-Balto-Slavic *salis > Old Prussian sal, Slavic *solь (OCS solь, Polish sól, Russian solʹ).

Other laryngeals were lost in Proto-Balto-Slavic, but in some cases, the syllable was acuted as a "leftover" of the former laryngeal. The following outcomes can be noted, with H standing for a laryngeal, V for a vowel, R for a sonorant and C for any consonant:

PIE	PBS
VH(C)	V̄ˀ(C)
VHV	V̄, VRV
VR	VR
VRH(C)	VRˀ(C)
VRHV	VRV

In the case of a VHV sequence, the outcome is VRV with a semivowel when the first vowel is close *i or *u, reflected in PIE *kruh₂és "blood" (gen. sg.) > PBS *kruves > Slavic *krъve. In other cases, the outcome is a long non-acute vowel.

The outcome of long vowels inherited directly from Proto-Indo-European, not lengthened by a laryngeal, is disputed. Traditional opinion holds that the acute is an automatic reflex of vowel length, and therefore all long vowels were automatically acuted, whether original or resulting from a following laryngeal. Absolutely word-final long vowels of PIE origin were not acuted, but remained distinct from long vowels resulting from laryngeals, a distinction also found in Proto-Germanic "overlong" vowels. Kortlandt instead takes the position that the acute reflects laryngeals only; thus inherited long vowels do not trigger the acute. Regardless, the acute appears in all cases of vowel lengthening within Balto-Slavic. All long vowels that arose as part of word formations or sound changes within the Balto-Slavic period received the acute. This included the new alternations *u ~ *ū and *i ~ *ī that were innovated within Balto-Slavic.

Aside from acuteness, syllabic sonorants followed by laryngeals show the same outcome as syllabic sonorants in other environments. Balto-Slavic shares that characteristic with Germanic but no other Indo-European languages, which show clearly distinct reflexes in this case. Compare:

- PIE *pl̥h₁nós > Proto-Balto-Slavic *pílˀnas (Slavic *pьlnъ, Lithuanian pìlnas), and Proto-Germanic *fullaz (< earlier *fulnaz, with regular *l̥ > *ul; English full), but Proto-Celtic *ɸlānos (where *l̥ > al normally).

=== Winter's law ===
Winter's law caused lengthening of vowels if a plain voiced stop followed, and the new long vowels received the acute. According to some analyses, the change occurred only if the stop was in syllable coda (the syllable ending with that consonant).

The plain and aspirated stops merged in Balto-Slavic, but Winter's law operated before this merger had taken place. Consequently, the distinction between those two series has been indirectly preserved in Proto-Balto-Slavic by long acuted vowels. Furthermore, Winter's law took place before *o and *a merged, as it lengthened earlier *o to *ōˀ and *a to *āˀ.

On the basis of relative chronology of sound changes, it has been ascertained that Winter's law acted before some other less prominent Balto-Slavic changes had occurred such as after the disappearance of laryngeals in prevocalic position. Compare:

- PIE *eǵh₂óm > Pre-Balto-Slavic *eźHom > (Winter's law) *ēˀźHom > Proto-Balto-Slavic *ēˀźun > Common Slavic *(j)azъ́ > OCS azъ, Slovene jaz.

The rules governing the emergence of the acute from voiced stops seem complicated when they are formulated within the framework of "classical" Proto-Indo-European laryngeal theory, as there is no obvious connection between laryngeals and voiced stops, both of which trigger the acute. Frederik Kortlandt has proposed an alternative, more elegant and economic rule for the derivation of Balto-Slavic acute by using the glottalic theory framework of Proto-Indo-European. He proposed that the acute is a reflex of a glottal stop, which has two sources, the merger of PIE laryngeals and the dissolution of PIE pre-glottalized stop ("voiced stops" in traditional reconstruction) to glottal stop and voiced stop, according to the Winter's law.

Though elegant, Kortlandt's theory also has some problems. The glottalic theory, which was proposed in the 1970s, is not generally accepted among linguists, and today only a small minority of linguists would consider it a reliable and self-supportive framework onto which to base modern Indo-European research. Also, there is a number of Balto-Slavic lexemes with the acute that are provably not of PIE laryngeal origin, and some of them were a result of apophonical lengthenings occurring only in Balto-Slavic period.

=== Nasals ===
Word-finally, *m became *n in Balto-Slavic. Final nasals are not directly preserved in most Balto-Slavic languages, however, making evidence mostly indirect. Lithuanian has vowel lengthening that reflects earlier nasal vowels, but they could conceivably come from either final -n or -m and thus do not provide evidence either way. Old Prussian does show final ⟨n⟩ in e.g. assaran "lake" < Proto-Balto-Slavic *éźeran/*áźeran < PIE *eǵʰerom, but since we have but a rudimentary understanding of Old Prussian pronunciation, this notation could also represent nasal vowels. In the other Baltic languages, no final nasals are retained. In Slavic, all word-final consonants are lost in one way or another so there is no direct evidence there either.

However, there is indirect evidence in the form of sandhi effects that were preserved in some Slavic pronouns. For example, Old Church Slavonic attests constructions like sъ nimь "with him", which can be traced back to Proto-Balto-Slavic *śun eimiš where the first word reflects the common Proto-Indo-European preposition *ḱom "with" (compare Latin cum), and the second reflects the PIE pronominal stem *ey- (Latin is, German er). In Slavic, in accordance with the "Law of Open Syllables", the final -n of the preposition was reinterpreted as belonging to the pronoun, which acted to preserve the nasal in its Balto-Slavic form, thus corroborating that it was indeed -n: If the change of *-m to *-n had not taken place at an earlier stage, the phrase would have been *śum eimiš, which would have given *sъ mimь in OCS instead.

=== Vowels ===
The following changes to vowels in Proto-Balto-Slavic can be noted:

- Long vowels are shortened before word-final *-n. Thus, the ā-stem accusative singular, originally *-āˀm, was shortened to *-an: Lithuanian -ą, Old Prussian -an, Slavic *-ǫ. If the genitive plural ending was originally *-ōm, it was shortened to *-on by this change.
- Word-final *-os and *-on are raised to *-us and *-un when stressed, e.g. *eǵh₂óm > Balto-Slavic *ēˀźun > Slavic *ãzъ. This causes a split in the o-stem paradigm, which is levelled in various ways later on. In Baltic, the nominals with original ending stress are transferred to the u-stem inflection. In Slavic, masculines of the two types are conflated and merge almost completely in most modern languages.
- Word-final *-mi is reduced to *-n after a long vowel. This change occurred after the shortening, so that the vowel remained long and, if applicable, acuted. For example, the ā-stem instrumental singular ending *-āmi was reduced to *-ān > Lithuanian -à, Slavic *-ǫ (compared to the o-stem ending *-ami > Slavic *-omь).
- *o > *a
- *un is lengthened to *ūˀn (with acute) when a stop followed. In Slavic, it is reflected as *y, with no nasal. For example: PIE *Hunk- "to get used to" > Balto-Slavic *ūˀnktei > Lithuanian jùnkti, Latvian jûkt, OCS vyknǫti, Upper Sorbian wuknyć. *in did not exhibit lengthening in such conditions, as older literature often states.

== Morphology ==
Proto-Balto-Slavic retained many of the grammatical features present in Proto-Indo-European.

=== Nominals ===
==== Grammatical categories ====
Proto-Balto-Slavic made use of seven cases:

- Nominative – subject
- Accusative – direct object
- Genitive – possession, relation or association; direct object of negated verb
- Locative – stationary location
- Dative – indirect object
- Instrumental – tool, means by which, accompanying
- Vocative – direct address

The eighth Proto-Indo-European case, the ablative, had merged with the genitive case. Some of the inflectional endings for the genitive were replaced with those of the former ablative.

Proto-Balto-Slavic also distinguished three numbers:

- singular (for one item)
- dual (for two items)
- plural (for three or more items)

The dual was retained into the early Slavic languages, but most modern Slavic languages have lost it. Slovene, Chakavian (a dialect of Serbo-Croatian), and Sorbian are the only remaining Slavic languages that still make consistent use of the dual number. In most other Slavic languages, the dual number is not retained except for historically paired nouns (eyes, ears, shoulders), certain fixed expressions, and agreement of nouns when used with numbers; it is synchronically often analyzed as genitive singular because of the resemblance in forms. The Baltic languages also used to have a dual number system, but it has become practically obsolete in modern Latvian and Lithuanian.

Finally, Proto-Balto-Slavic nouns could also have one of three genders: masculine, feminine or neuter. Many originally neuter nouns in PIE had become masculine in Balto-Slavic so the group was somewhat reduced relative to the others. The modern Slavic languages largely continue the use of three grammatical genders, but modern Baltic languages have merged the neuter gender into the masculine. Lithuanian has no neuter-gender nouns, but in pronouns, participles and numerals, the neuter is retained. Latvian has no neuter gender at all.

An innovation within Balto-Slavic was the use of the genitive in place of the accusative for the direct object of a negative verb. That feature is still present in its descendants:

- "I have read the book": Slovene sèm brál knjígo, Lithuanian knỹgą skaičiau
- "I have not read the book": Slovene nísem brál knjíge, Lithuanian knỹgos neskaičiau

==== Examples of noun declensions ====
*wilkás (wolf, m.) < PIE *wĺ̥kʷos
Case	Singular	Dual	Plural
Nom.	*wilkás < *wĺ̥kʷos	*wílkōˀ < *wĺ̥kʷoh₁	*wilkái(ˀ) < *wĺ̥kʷoes
Gen.	*wílkā < *wĺ̥kʷosyo	*wilkā́u(ˀ) < ?	*wilkṓn <*wĺ̥kʷoHom
Dat.	*wílkōi < *wĺ̥kʷoey	*wilkámā(ˀ) < ?	*wilkámas < *wĺ̥kʷomos
Acc.	*wílkan < *wĺ̥kʷom	*wílkōˀ < *wĺ̥kʷoh₁	*wílkō^{(}ˀ^{)}ns < *wĺ̥kʷoms
Voc.	*wílke < *wĺ̥kʷe	*wílkōˀ < *wĺ̥kʷoh₁	*wilkái(ˀ) < *wĺ̥kʷoes
Loc.	*wílkai < *wĺ̥kʷoy	*wilkā́u(ˀ) < ?	*wilkáišu < *wĺ̥kʷoysu
Instr.	*wílkōˀ < *wĺ̥kʷoh₁	*wilkámāˀ < ?	*wilkṓis < *wĺ̥kʷōys

*bardā́ˀ (beard, f.) < PIE *bʰardʰéh₂
Case	Singular	Dual	Plural
Nom.	*bardā́ˀ < *bʰardʰéh₂	*bárdāiˀ < *bʰardʰéh₂h₁(e)	*bárdās < *bʰardʰéh₂es
Gen.	*bardā́(ˀ)s < *bʰardʰéh₂s	*bardā́u(ˀ) < ?	*bardṓn < *bʰardʰéh₂oHom
Dat.	*bárdāi < *bʰardʰéh₂ey	*bardā́(ˀ)mā(ˀ) < ?	*bardā́(ˀ)mas < *bʰardʰéh₂mos
Acc.	*bárdā(ˀ)n < *bʰardʰā́m	*bárdāiˀ < *bʰardʰéh₂h₁(e)	*bárdā(ˀ)ns < *bʰardʰéh₂m̥s
Voc.	*bárda < *bʰardʰéh₂	*bárdāiˀ < *bʰardʰéh₂h₁(e)	*bárdās < *bʰardʰéh₂es
Loc.	*bardā́iˀ < *bʰardʰéh₂i	*bardā́u(ˀ) < ?	*bardā́(ˀ)su < *bʰardʰéh₂su
Instr.	*bárdāˀn < *bʰardʰéh₂h₁	*bardā́(ˀ)māˀ < ?	*bardā́(ˀ)mīˀs < *bʰardʰéh₂mis

*jūˀga (yoke, n.) < PIE *yugóm
Case	Singular	Dual	Plural
Nom.	*jūˀga < *yugóm	*jūˀgai < *yugóy(h₁)	*jūˀgāˀ < *yugéh₂
Gen.	*jūˀgā < *yugósyo	*jūˀgāu(ˀ) < ?	*jūˀgōn < *yugóHom
Dat.	*jūˀgōi < *yugóey	*jūˀgamā(ˀ) < ?	*jūˀgamas < *yugómos
Acc.	*jūˀga < *yugóm	*jūˀgai < *yugóy(h₁)	*jūˀgāˀ < *yugéh₂
Voc.	*jūˀga < *yugóm	*jūˀgai < *yugóy(h₁)	*jūˀgāˀ < *yugéh₂
Loc.	*jūˀgai < *yugóy	*jūˀgāu(ˀ) < ?	*jūˀgaišu < *yugóysu
Instr.	*jūˀgōˀ < *yugóh₁	*jūˀgamāˀ < ?	*jūˀgōis < *yugṓys

==== Adjectives ====
A Balto-Slavic innovation to the inflection of adjectives was the creation of a distinct "definite" inflection of adjectives by affixing forms of the pronoun *ja- to existing adjective forms. The inflection had a function resembling that of the definite article 'the' in English: Lithuanian geràsis, Old Church Slavonic добрꙑи "the good" vs. gẽras, добръ "good". The distinction is no longer productive in most Slavic languages today, and most Slavic languages preserve a mixture of definite forms and indefinite forms in a single paradigm.

Russian, Czech and Polish for example use the original definite nominative singular forms (Russian -ый, -ая, -ое (-yj, -aja, -oje), Polish -y, -a, -e, Czech -ý, -á, -é). Czech and Polish have lost the indefinite forms except in a few limited uses, while Russian preserves the indefinite nominative forms as the so-called "short forms", used in some cases in predicate position. Serbo-Croatian and Slovene still distinguish the two types but only in the masculine nominative singular (definite -i versus indefinite with no ending). Bulgarian and Macedonian retain the distinction, but while the indefinite forms are direct reflexes of the PBS ones, the definite forms have been extended by suffixing forms of the demonstrative pronoun *t- (Proto-Slavic *tъ, Proto-Balto-Slavic *tas); the base to which *t- is added has mostly come to coincide with the indefinite form due to sound changes, but its origin is still seen in the definite masculine singular ending (Bulgarian -ият -ijat -/ijɤt/, Macedonian -иот -iot).

There is no available reconstruction of the whole adjectival system in PBS at the moment, but an idea can be traced if a PIE adjective is put together with its PBS and PB reflex. The adjective are PIE *bʰardʰéh₂tos ("bearded") and its reflex in PSL *bordatъ (< PBS *bardā́ˀtas) and the PB *labas ("good"), declined in the masculine, feminine and neuter gender. The superlative is formed differently, at least in PSL (prefix *naj-) and PB (infix *-mi-).

The masculine singular, from PBS *-as, culminates into PSL short *-ъ, which is in turn elided in the modern Slavic languages, leading to a zero ending in the short forms.

The most innovative case in PBS, PSL and PB is the instrumental case: from the declension of nouns in PIE, the masculine, feminine and neuter singular are respectively *-oh₁, *-éh₂h₁, *-oh₁, whose reflexed in PBS noun declensions are *-ōˀ, *-āˀn, *-ōˀ. The feminine shows the epithesis of /n/ which could lead to a nasalization in PS feminine *-ǫ < earlier *-ą, perhaps from a variant *-āˀn. While PB retains *-ōˀ in the masculine and neuter, PSL re-elaborate the case suffix into *-omь for reasons unknown at the moment.

Secondly, the vocative feminine in PSL changes into *-o from an expected reflex *-a /a:/; by contrast, PB is more regular and conservative since it culminates into *-ā. In PBS noun declension, the feminine vocative is a short *-a.

Development of adjectives in PBS (singular)
Case (singular)	PIE	PSL	PB
Nom.	*bʰardʰéh₂tos, bʰardʰéh₂teh₂, bʰardʰéh₂tom	*bordatъ, bordata, bordato	*labas, labā, laban
Gen.	*bʰardʰéh₂tosyo, *bʰardʰéh₂teh₂s, *bʰardʰéh₂tosyo	*bordata, bordaty, bordata	*labas(a), labās, labas(a)
Dat.	*bʰardʰéh₂toey, *bʰardʰéh₂teh₂ey, *bʰardʰéh₂toey	*bordatu, bordatě, bordatu	*labōi, labāi, labōi
Acc.	*bʰardʰéh₂tom, *bʰardʰéh₂tām, *bʰardʰéh₂tom	*bordatъ, bordatǫ (< earlier *-ą), bordato	*laban, labā, laban
Voc.	*bʰardʰéh₂te, *bʰardʰéh₂teh₂, *bʰardʰéh₂tom	*bordate, bordato, bordato	*labas, labā, laban
Loc.	*bʰardʰéh₂toy/ey, *bʰardʰéh₂teh₂i, *bʰardʰéh₂toy/ey	*bordatě, bordatě, bordatě (*-ě < PBS *-ai < PIE *-oy)	*labei, labāi, labei (*-ei < PBS *-ei < PIE *-ey)
Instr.	*bʰardʰéh₂toh₁, *bʰardʰéh₂teh₂h₁, *bʰardʰéh₂toh₁	*bordatomь, bordatojǫ (< *-oją?), bordatomь (*-oją? < variant *-ojāˀn from original PBS *-āˀn in noun declension?)	*labō, labān (< PBS -āˀn?), labō

Development of adjectives in PBS (non-dual plural)
Case (plural)	PIE	PSL	PB
Nom.	*bʰardʰéh₂toes, bʰardʰéh₂teh₂es, bʰardʰéh₂teh₂	*bordata, bordatě, bordatě	*labai, labās, labā
Gen.	*bʰardʰéh₂toHom, bʰardʰéh₂teh₂oHom, bʰardʰéh₂toHom	*bordatu, bordatu, bordatu	*labōn, labōn, labōn
Dat.	*bʰardʰéh₂tomos, bʰardʰéh₂teh₂mos, bʰardʰéh₂tomos	*bordatoma, bordatama, bordatoma	*labamas, labāmas, labamas
Acc.	*bʰardʰéh₂toms, bʰardʰéh₂teh₂m̥s, bʰardʰéh₂teh₂	*bordata, bordatě, bordatě	*labōns, labāns, labā
Voc.	*bʰardʰéh₂toes, bʰardʰéh₂teh₂es, bʰardʰéh₂teh₂	*bordata, bordatě, bordatě	*labai, labās, labā
Loc.	*bʰardʰéh₂toysu, bʰardʰéh₂teh₂su, bʰardʰéh₂toysu	*bordatu, bordatu, bordatu	*labeisu, labāsu, labeisu
Instr.	*bʰardʰéh₂tōys, bʰardʰéh₂teh₂mis, bʰardʰéh₂tōys	*bordatoma, bordatama, bordatoma	*labais, labāmīs, labais

==== Cardinal and ordinal numbers ====
Cardinal number	PIE	PBS
One (1)	*h₁óynos	*aiˀnas
Two (2)	*dwóh₁	*duwō
Three (3)	*tréyes	*tríjes
Four (4)	*kʷetwóres	*ketū́res
Five (5)	*pénkʷe	*pénki
Six (6)	*swéḱs	*séš? (> PB *sešes > Ltv. seši) *uš? (> Proto-Western-Baltic *us) *šéš (> PS *šȅstь)
Seven (7)	*septḿ̥	*septín
Eight (8)	*oḱtṓw	*aśtṓ
Nine (9)	*h₁néwn̥	*néwin (> variant *dewin)
Ten (10)	*déḱm̥t	*déśimt

Ordinal number	PIE	PBS
First	*pr̥h₃wós	*pírˀwas (> PS *pьrvъ) *pírˀmas (> PB *pirmas)
Second	*h₂énteros *(h₁)witoros	*ántaras *witaras (> PS *vъtorъ)
Third	*trit(y)ós	*tirtias > *tretias
Fourth	*kʷ(e)twr̥tós	*ketwirtas
Fifth	*penkʷetós	*penktas
Sixth	*sweḱstós *weḱstós? *uḱstós?	*seśtas (> PB *seštas > Ltv. seši) *uśtas (> PB *uštas > Pruss. usts)
Seventh	*septm̥mós	*septmas
Eight	*oḱtowós > *oḱtmos? (by analogy with *septm̥mós)	*aśtmas
Ninth	*h₁newn̥nós > *h₁newntós? (by analogy with other numerals)	*newin(t)as (> Pruss. newīnts) *dewin(t)as (> PS devętъ)
Tenth	*deḱm̥tós	*deśimtás

=== Verbs ===
The distinction between athematic and thematic verbs was preserved, but athematic verbs were gradually reduced in number. The primary first-person singular endings, athematic *-mi and thematic *-oh₂, were kept distinct, giving Balto-Slavic *-mi and *-ōˀ respectively. The thematic ending was occasionally extended by adding the athematic ending to it, apparently in Balto-Slavic times, resulting in a third ending: *-ōˀmi > *-ōˀm > *-ōˀn > *-an, replacing the original ending in Slavic, reflected as *-ǫ (Russian -у (-u), Polish -ę, Bulgarian -a).

In many Slavic languages, particularly South and West Slavic, the athematic ending was analogically extended to other verbs and even replaced the thematic ending completely in some languages (Slovene, Serbo-Croatian, Slovak). In the Baltic languages, only the thematic ending was retained, as Lithuanian -ù and Latvian -u (< East Baltic *-uoˀ < Balto-Slavic *-ōˀ). In Latvian, the first-person singular form of būt "to be" is esmu, which preserves the original *-m- of the athematic ending, but it was extended with the thematic ending.

Balto-Slavic replaced the PIE second-person singular ending *-si with *-seHi > *-sei (> PSL *-si /si:/, PB *-ēi) for which the origin is not fully understood. According to Kortlandt, the ending is a combination of the ending *-si with *-eHi, which he considers to be the original thematic ending. The new ending, *-sei, carried over into all three branches of Balto-Slavic and came to be used in all athematic root verbs in Baltic. In Old Church Slavonic, it completely ousted the older ending. In the other Slavic languages, the original ending generally survives except in the athematic verbs.

The aspectual distinction between present and aorist was retained and still productive in Proto-Balto-Slavic. It was preserved into early Slavic but was gradually replaced with an innovated aspectual distinction, with a variety of forms. Modern Bulgarian retained the aorist, however, alongside the innovated system, producing a four-way contrast. The Indo-European perfect/stative was falling out of use in Proto-Balto-Slavic and was likely already reduced to relics by Proto-Balto-Slavic times. It survives in Slavic only in the irregular Old Church Slavonic form vědě "I know" (< Balto-Slavic *waidai < PIE *wóyde, from *weyd- "to see"), which preserves an irregular first-person singular ending, presumed to originate in the perfect.

Proto-Indo-European did not originally have an infinitive, but it did have several constructions that served as action nouns. Two of these, the -tis and -tus nouns, remained in use into Balto-Slavic and acquired verbal noun and infinitive-like functions. They were not fully integrated into the verb system by Balto-Slavic times, however, and the individual Balto-Slavic languages diverge on the details. In Slavic and the Eastern Baltic languages, the infinitive was formed from a case form of the -tis noun: Lithuanian -ti, Latvian -t, Proto-Slavic *-ti. Old Prussian, however, has -t and -twei as infinitive endings, the latter of which comes from the -tus noun instead. The shorter -t could come from either type.

==== Derivation of PBS verbs from PIE ====
There is no available attempt of a full reconstruction of PBS verb system at the moment, but an idea could be traced if some PIE verbs are put together with their PSL and PB reflex. If this comparison is made by taking the PB verb system as foundation, verbs in PB can belong to four classes: *-o stem, *-i stem, *-ā stem and the athematic class. The verbs are:

- PIE *bʰéroh₂ (3rd person *bʰereti, "to bear"), its descendant in PSL and an example of reconstructed PB verb, *rinktei ("gather, collect", verb in *-o- stem; see modern Lithuanian "rinkti"); by analogy, another example could be PIE *dʰégʷʰoh₂ (to burn) > PBS *degtéi, with a striking resemblance to PB *rinktei, and early PSL *gegti > *žeťi;
- PIE *turHyóh₂ (3rd person *turHyéti, "to enclose/grab") and its descendant in PB *turētei ("to have", verb in *-i- stem; see modern Lithuanian "turėti");
- PIE *loykʷéyoh₂ (3rd person *loykʷéyeti, causative form of *leykʷ-, "to leave"), its descendant in PB *laikītei ("hold"; verb in *-ā- stem; see modern Lithuanian "laikyti") and PSL *buditi (3rd person singular *buditь < PIE *bʰowdʰéyeti).
- The athematic verb "to be" in PIE, PSL and PB.

Development to PB *-o stem
Person	PIE (thematic)	PSL	PB (*-o stem)
I	*bʰéroh₂	*berǫ (< early PSL *-ą < PBS *-an < earlier *-ōˀmi)	*renkō (< PBS *-ōˀ)
You	*bʰéresi	*bereši	*renkēi (< PBS *-sei < pre-BS *-seHi)
He, she, it	*bʰéreti	*beretь	*renka
We two	*bʰérowos	*berevě	*renkau̯ā
You two	*bʰéretes	*bereta	*renkatā
They (two)	*bʰéretes	*berete	*renka
We	*bʰéromos	*beremъ	*renkamē
You (all)	*bʰérete	*berete	*renkatē
They	*bʰéronti	*berǫtь (< early PSL *-ątь < PBS *-anti?)	*renka
(Infinitive)	- -	PBS *bírāˀtei > PSL *bьrati	*rinktei

Development to PB *-i stem
Person	PIE (thematic)	PSL	PB (*-i stem)
I	*turHyóh₂	*-jǫ (< early PSL *-ją < PBS *-jan < earlier *-jōˀmi?)	*turi̯ō (< PBS *-jōˀ?)
You	*turHyési	? (any PSL verb derived from PIE *-yéti)	*turēi (< PB *-sei < pre-BS *-seHi)
He, she, it	*turHyéti	?	*turi (< PIE *turHyéti)
We two	*turHyówos	?	*turiu̯ā
You two	*turHyétes	?	*turitā
They (two)	*turHyétes	?	*turi
We	*turHyómos	?	*turimē
You (all)	*turHyéte	?	*turitē
They	*turHyónti	?	*turi
(Infinitive)	- -	?	*turētei

Development to PB *-ā stem
Person	PIE (thematic)	PSL	PB (*-ā stem)
I	*loykʷéyoh₂	*buďǫ (< early PSL *-ją < PBS *-jan < earlier *-jōˀmi?)	*laikāu
You	*loykʷéyesi	*budiši	*laikāi
He, she, it	*loykʷéyeti	*buditь	*laikā
We two	*loykʷéyowos	*budivě	*laikāu̯ā
You two	*loykʷéyetes	*budita	*laikātā
They (two)	*loykʷéyetes	*budite	*laikā
We	*loykʷéyomos	*budimъ	*laikāmē
You (all)	*loykʷéyete	*budite	*laikātē
They	*loykʷéyonti	*budętь /ẽː/ < PBS *-e/ēnti?	*laikā
(Infinitive)	- -	* PBS *báudīˀtei > PSL *buditi	*laikītei

Development of the verb "to be"
Person	PIE (athematic)	PBS	PSL (athematic)	PB (athematic)
I	*h₁ésmi	*ésmi	*esmь	*esmi
You	*h₁ési	*ési (*ései?)	*esi	*esēi
He, she, it	*h₁ésti	*ésti; *irā	*estь	*esti; *irā (> Lith. yrà)
We two	*h₁swós	*éswas?	*esvě	*esu̯ā
You two	*h₁stés	*estes?	*esta	*estā
They (two)	*h₁stés	*estes?	*este	*esti
We	*h₁smós	*esmas?	*esmъ	*esmē
You (all)	*h₁sté	*éste	*este	*estē
They	*h₁sénti, *h₁sonti	*sénti, *sánti; *irā	*sętь, *sǫtь	*esti; *irā
(Infinitive)	- -	*bū́ˀtei	*byti	*būtei

==== Personal pronouns ====
Pronouns (without dual number)
Personal pronoun (nom. case)	PBS	PIE
I	*ēź	*éǵh₂
You	*tūˀ	*túh₂
He (m.)	*anas *is *tas	*h₁ónos ("that") *ís ("the aforementioned") *só ("that") (> PB *tas)
She (f.)	*anāˀ *īˀ *tāˀ	*h₁óneh₂ (> PS *ona) *íh₂ *séh₂ (> PB *tā)
It (n.)	*ana? *i? *ta	*h₁ónod (> PS *ono) *íd *tód (> PB *ta)
We	*mes	*wéy > *méy
You (all)	*jūˀs	*yū́(s)
They (m.)	*anai *eis *tai	*h₁ónoy (> PS *oni) *éyes *tóy (> PB *tai / *tei)
They (f.)	*anās? *jās *tās	*h₁óneh₂es (> PS *ony) *íh₂es (> PB *jās) *téh₂es (> PB *tās)
They (n.)	*anāˀ *īˀ *tā	*h₁óneh₂ (> PS *ona) *íh₂ *téh₂ (> PB *tā)

=== Accentual system ===
The Proto-Indo-European accent was completely reworked in Balto-Slavic, with far-reaching consequences for accentual systems of the modern daughter languages. The development was conditioned by several delicate factors, such as the syllable length, presence of a laryngeal closing the syllable, and the position of PIE ictus. There is still no consensus among Balto-Slavists on the precise details of the development of Balto-Slavic accentual system. All modern research is based on the seminal study of Stang (1957), which basically instituted the field of comparative Balto-Slavic accentology. However, many laws and correspondences have been discovered and are now held to be true by the majority of researchers even if the exact details sometimes remain in dispute.

Early Balto-Slavic retained a simple accent in which only the placement of the accent was distinctive, but there were no pitch distinctions. The acute register was initially no more than an articulatory feature on certain syllables and could occur independently of accent placement. However, the acute was the trigger for several sound changes that affected the placement of the accent. For example, under Hirt's law, the accent tended to shift leftwards onto a syllable that bore the acute.

On accented syllables, the acute came to be accompanied by a distinct pitch contour in late Proto-Balto-Slavic. Consequently, accented syllables of any type that could carry the acute register in Proto-Balto-Slavic (listed above) now differed in pitch contour as well as articulation; they had rising or falling pitch (whether accented acute syllables had rising or falling pitch differed by dialect). The tonal accents that emerged from this process are called "acute accent" and "circumflex accent" in Balto-Slavic linguistics.

Syllables with a single short vowel could not bear the acute register and so also had no tonal distinctions. When accented, they had the same pitch contour (though nondistinctive) as a circumflex-accented syllable. The syllables are said to have "short accent".

To reconstruct the Balto-Slavic accent, the most important are those languages that have retained tonal oppositions: Lithuanian, Latvian, (probably) Old Prussian and the West South Slavic languages of Slovene and Serbo-Croatian. However, one should keep in mind that the prosodical systems of dialects in the aforementioned languages are sometimes very different from those of standard languages. For example, some Croatian dialects like Čakavian and Posavian dialects of Slavonian Štokavian are especially important for Balto-Slavic accentology, as they retain more archaic and complex tonal accentual system than the Neoštokavian dialect on which modern standard varieties of Serbo-Croatian (Bosnian, Croatian and Serbian) are based. On the other hand, many dialects have completely lost tonal oppositions (such as some Kajkavian varieties, the Zagreb spoken nonstandard idiom).

A minority view, originating from Vladimir Dybo, considers Balto-Slavic accentuation (based on correspondences in the Germanic, Celtic, and Italic languages) more archaic than Greek-Vedic and therefore closer to Proto-Indo-European.

==== Notation ====
What follows is a short overview of the commonly used diacritical marks for Balto-Slavic (BSl.) accents and/or prosodic features, all based on the example letter a. In each case, there is a crude characterization of the pronunciation in terms of High, Mid, and Low-tone sequences.

- Lithuanian: "falling"/HL (acute) á, "rising"/H(L)H (circumflex) ã, "short"/H à
- Latvian (on all syllables): "falling"/HL à, "rising"/LH (or "lengthened") ã, "broken"/L'H â
- Slovenian: "falling"/HL ȃ, "rising"/LH á, "short"/H ȁ
- Serbo-Croatian: "short falling"/HL ȁ, "long falling"/HML ȃ, "short rising"/LH à, "long rising"/LMH á, "posttonic length" ā
- Common Slavic: "short falling"/HL (short circumflex) ȁ, "long falling"/HML (long circumflex) ȃ, "acute"/LH (old acute, old rising") a̋, "neoacute"/L(M)H (new acute, new rising") á or ã

In Croatian dialects, the "neoacute" ("new acute", a new rising tone) is usually marked with tilde, as ã. It represent a post–Proto-Slavic development.

Here is a reverse key to help decode the various diacritical marks:

- acute accent (á): Usually long rising and/or BSl. acute. Neoacute in some Slavic reconstructions. The default accent when a language has only one phonemic prosodic feature (such as stress in Russian, length in Czech). Marks long falling in Lithuanian because this derives from BSl. acute.
- grave accent (à): Usually short rising or simply short.
- circumflex accent (â): BSl. circumflex in reconstructions. Broken tone in modern Baltic (Latvian and Žemaitian Lithuanian), a vowel with a glottal stop in the middle (derives from BSl. acute). Long falling in modern Slavic languages.
- tilde (ã): Alternative notation for BSl. circumflex in reconstructions. Long rising in various modern languages (Lithuanian, Latvian, archaic Serbo-Croatian dialects such as Chakavian). Derives from diverse sources: Lithuanian < BSl. circumflex, Latvian < BSl. acute, Serbo-Croatian dialects < long Common Slavic neoacute (from accentual retraction).
- double grave accent (ȁ): Usually short falling (mostly in Slavic). Derived from circumflex (= long falling) by converting the "acute" portion of the accent to a grave, much as a simple acute (= long rising) is shortened by conversion to a grave.
- double acute accent (a̋): Old acute in some Slavic reconstructions. (As opposed to a single acute for Slavic neoacute in reconstructions. Based on the fact that the old acute was shortened in Common Slavic.)
- macron (ā): Vowel length, particularly in syllables without tone (such as unstressed syllables in Slavic).
- breve (ă): Vowel shortness.

There are multiple competing systems used for different languages and different periods. The most important are these:

1. Three-way system of Proto-Slavic, Proto-Balto-Slavic, modern Lithuanian: acute tone (á) vs. circumflex tone (â or ã) vs. short accent (à).
2. Four-way Serbo-Croatian system, also used in Slovenian and often in Slavic reconstructions: long rising (á), short rising (à), long falling (â), short falling (ȁ).
3. Two-way length: long (ā) vs. short (ă).
4. Length only, as in Czech and Slovak: long (á) vs. short (a).
5. Stress only, as in Russian, Ukrainian and Bulgarian: stressed (á) vs. unstressed (a).

Many nonprosodic marks are also found in various languages in combinations with certain letters. The various combinations of letter and diacritic should normally be viewed as single symbols (i.e. as equivalent to such simple symbols as a, b, c ...).

Examples on vowels:

- ogonek (ą): With a rightward-curving hook unlike the leftward-curving cedilla (ç): Vowel nasalization. In Standard Lithuanian, the nasalization is historical and the vowels are now simply reflected as long vowels, but some dialects still preserve nasalized vowels. Occasionally used to indicate low-mid quality in e, o.
- overdot (ė ȯ), underdot (ẹ ọ): High-mid vowel quality [e o], distinguished from plain e o indicating low-mid vowels [ɛ ɔ]. The overdot is normally found in Lithuanian, the underdot in Slovenian.
- inverted breve below (e̯ i̯ o̯ u̯), indicating nonsyllabic vowels (often, it is the second part of a diphthong).
- háček (ě): With a pointed v shape, rather than the rounded u shape of the breve: ě, in Slavic reconstructions, is a vowel known as yat, distinct in length and later quality from simple e (originally longer and lower; later, longer and higher in many dialects), but ě, in Czech, sometimes indicates instead a simple e, with palatalization of the preceding consonant (dě tě ně).
- ô, ó, ů originally indicated a high-mid [o] or diphthongized [uo] in various Slavic languages (respectively: Slovak/dialectal Russian; Polish/Upper Sorbian/Lower Sorbian; Czech). It now indicates [u] in Polish and long [uː] in Czech.

Examples in consonants:

- Most diacritics on consonants indicate various sorts of palatal sounds such as an acute accent (ć ǵ ḱ ĺ ń ŕ ś ź), a comma (ģ ķ ļ ņ), a haček (č ď ľ ň ř š ť ž) or an overbar (đ). They can indicate three:
  - palatoalveolars (č š ž): They have a "hushing" pronunciation [tʃ ʃ ʒ], as in English kitchen, mission, vision and are less palatal than the sounds indicated by ć ś ź;
  - alveolopalatals (ć đ ś ź, as in Polish and Serbo-Croatian);
  - palatal stops (voiceless ḱ/ķ/ť and voiced ǵ/ģ/ď in Macedonian, Latvian and Czech, respectively);
  - a palatal nasal (ń ņ ň);
  - a palatal lateral (ĺ ļ ľ); or
  - a palatalized trill (ŕ, also ř in Czech specifically for a fricative trill).
- In Slovak, ĺ and ŕ indicate doubled rather than palatal(ized) consonants (vŕba "willow", hĺbka "depth").
- In western West Slavic (Polish, Kashubian, Upper Sorbian and Lower Sorbian), ż indicates a voiced retroflex sibilant [ʐ]. (Other such sibilants are indicated by digraphs like cz, sz.)
- In western West Slavic, ł indicates a sound that was once a dark (velarized) l but is now usually pronounced [w].

==== Accent paradigms ====
Proto-Balto-Slavic, just like Proto-Indo-European, had a class of nominals with so called "mobile" accentuation in which accent alternated between the word stem and the ending. The classes of nominals are usually reconstructed on the basis of Vedic Sanskrit and Ancient Greek, which have retained the position of the original PIE accent almost unchanged. However, by comparing the Balto-Slavic evidence, it was discovered that the PIE rules on accent alternations, devised on the basis of Vedic and Greek, do not match those found in Balto-Slavic.

Moreover, nominals that belong to mobile paradigms in Balto-Slavic belong to declension classes that always had fixed accent in PIE paradigms: ā-stems and o-stems. For a long time, the exact relationships between the accentuation of nominals in Balto-Slavic and PIE was one of the most mysterious questions of Indo-European studies, and some parts of the puzzle are still missing.

Research conducted by Christian Stang, Ferdinand de Saussure, Vladislav Illich-Svitych and Vladimir Dybo has led to a conclusion that Balto-Slavic nominals, with regard to accentuation, could be reduced to two paradigms: fixed and mobile. Nominals of the fixed paradigm had accent on one of the stem syllables, and in the nominals of the mobile paradigm, the accent alternated between the stem and the ending. As shown by Illič-Svityč, Balto-Slavic nominals of the fixed paradigm correspond to the PIE nominals with accent on the root (PIE barytones). The only exception were nominals with the accent on the ending (PIE oxytones) when it was shifted onto the root in Balto Slavic in accordance with Hirt's law; such nominals also have fixed accent in Balto-Slavic.

The origin of the Balto-Slavic nominals of the mobile paradigm has not been completely determined, with several proposed theories of origin. According to Illič-Svityč, they originate as an analogical development from fixed-accent PIE oxytones. That theory has been criticized as leaving unclear why PIE nominals with fixed accent on the ending would become mobile, as analogies usually lead to uniformity and regularity. According to Meillet and Stang, Balto-Slavic accentual mobility was inherited from PIE consonant and vowel-stems but not for o-stems, where they represent Balto-Slavic innovation. Vedic and Greek lost the accentual mobility in vowel stems, retaining it only in consonant stems. De Saussure explained it as a result of accent retraction in the medially stressed syllables of consonant-stems exhibiting the hysterokinetic paradigm, with vocalic stems subsequently imitating the new accentual patterns by analogy. According to Dybo the position of Balto-Slavic accent is determined by a formula from PIE tones according to the valence theory developed by the Moscow school, which presupposes lexical tone in PIE. Kortlandt up to 2006 supported the theory of Balto-Slavic losing PIE consonant-stem accentual mobility in nominals, and innovating everywhere else, but after 2006 maintains that the original PIE accentual mobility was preserved in Balto-Slavic in ā-stems (eh₂-stems), i-stems, u-stems and consonant-stems.

The Balto-Slavic accentual system was further reworked during the Proto-Slavic and Common Slavic period (Dybo's law, Meillet's law, Ivšić's law, etc.), resulting in three Common Slavic accentual paradigms (conventionally indicated using the letters A, B, C), corresponding to four Lithuanian accentual paradigms (indicated with the numbers 1, 2, 3, 4) in a simple scheme:

		Acute register on the root	
		yes	no
fixed accent	yes	a.p. 1/a.p. A	a.p. 2/a.p. B
fixed accent	no	a.p. 3/a.p. C	a.p. 4/a.p. C

===== Fixed paradigm with acuted root =====
The simplest accentuation is that of nominals which were acuted on the root in Balto-Slavic. They remain accented on the root (root here is understood in the Proto-Balto-Slavic, not the PIE sense) throughout the paradigm in Baltic (Lithuanian first accentual paradigm) and Slavic (accent paradigm a).

		Lithuanian	Russian	Serbo-Croatian	Slovene
sg	N	várna	voróna	vrȁna	vrána
sg	V	várna	—	vrȁno	—
sg	A	várną	vorónu	vrȁnu	vráno
sg	G	várnos	voróny	vrȁnē	vráne
sg	D	várnai	voróne	vrȁni	vráni
sg	L	várnoje	voróne	vrȁni	vráni
sg	I	várna	vorónoj	vrȁnōm	vráno
du	NAV	—	—	—	vráni
du	G	—	—	—	vrán
du	DI	—	—	—	vránama
du	L	—	—	—	vránah
pl	NV	várnos	voróny	vrȁne	vráne
pl	A	várnas	vorón	vrȁne	vráne
pl	G	várnų	vorón	vrȃnā	vrán
pl	D	várnoms	vorónam	vrȁnama	vránam
pl	L	várnose	vorónax	vrȁnama	vránah
pl	I	várnomis	vorónami	vrȁnama	vránami

- Russian exhibits "polnoglasie", in which liquid diphthongs receive an epenthetic vowel after them. An acute-accented liquid diphthong yields accent on the epenthetic vowel; a circumflex-accented one results in accent on the first (original) vowel (-árˀ- > -oró-, -ar- > -óro-). Serbo-Croatian and Slovene show metathesis instead.
- Serbo-Croatian does not reflect the acute as a tonal distinction but shows short falling accent consistently for all words with post-Slavic initial accent regardless of tone. The short falling accent in the genitive plural has been lengthened due to the loss of a yer. The addition of -ā is a later innovation.
- Slovene has a rising vowel, which reflects the original acute. All short accented vowels in non-final syllables were lengthened, which eliminated the length distinction in the genitive plural.

===== Fixed paradigm with non-acuted root =====
In the nouns with non-mobile initial accent, which did not have an acuted root syllable, both Lithuanian and Slavic had an independent accent shift occur, from the root to the ending. In Lithuanian, they are the nouns of the second accent paradigm and in Slavic, the accent paradigm b.

Lithuanian noun rankà "hand" etymologically corresponds to Russian ruká and Serbo-Croatian rúka, but both became mobile in a later Common Slavic development so the reflexes of the Proto-Slavic noun *juxá "soup" are listed instead.

		Lithuanian	Russian	Serbo-Croatian	Slovene
sg	N	rankà	uxá	júha	júha
sg	V	rañka	—	jȗho	—
sg	A	rañką	uxú	júhu	júho
sg	G	rañkos	uxí	júhē	júho
sg	D	rañkai	uxé	júsi/juhi	júhi
sg	L	rañkoje	uxé	júsi/juhi	júhi
sg	I	rankà	uxój	júhōm	júho
du	NAV	—	—	—	júhi
du	GL	—	—	—	—
du	DI	—	—	—	júhama
pl	N	rañkos	uxí	júhe	júhe
pl	V	rañkos	—	jȗhe	júhe
pl	A	rankàs	uxí	júhe	júhe
pl	G	rañkų	úx	júhā	júh
pl	D	rañkoms	uxám	júhama	júham
pl	L	rañkose	uxáx	júhama	júhah
pl	I	rañkomis	uxámi	júhama	júhami

- In Lithuanian, the initial accent was preserved in all cases where the ending did not contain an acuted syllable. In the forms that had an acuted ending (nominative and instrumental singular, accusative plural), the accent shifted onto the ending, in accordance with the rule discovered by de Saussure. Later, that acuted syllable was shortened by Leskien's law.
- In Slavic, the accent shifted from a non-acute root onto the ending in all case forms in accordance with Dybo's law.
- In the Neoštokavian dialects of Serbo-Croatian, which are used as the basis for standard Bosnian, Croatian and Serbian, the so-called "Neoštokavian retraction" occurred: the accent was retracted from the ending onto the root syllable and became rising. Old Štokavian and Čakavian dialects preserved the original ending-stressed paradigm.
- Slovene also has retraction of the accent, which results in a long rising tone.

===== Mobile paradigm =====
Nominals with mobile accent had in some cases an accented first syllable, in others an accented ending.

Lithuanian distinguishes two accent paradigms of these nominals, depending on whether the root was acuted, as in the fixed paradigm, or not.

- If the root was acuted, it is said to belong to third accent paradigm.
- If the root was not acuted, then, by the operation of de Saussure's law, the accent shifted onto all the acuted endings in the paradigm, and these nouns are accounted as belonging to the fourth accent paradigm.

In Proto-Slavic, the operation of Meillet's law converted acute roots to circumflexed in mobile nominals, so that the split found in Lithuanian does not occur. All nominals with mobile accentuation in Balto-Slavic belong to one accent paradigm in Slavic, accent paradigm C.

		Lithuanian	Russian	Neoštokavian Serbo-Croatian	Čakavian Serbo-Croatian	Slovene	Common Slavic
sg	N	galvà	golová	gláva	glāvȁ	gláva	*golvà
sg	V	gálva	—	glȃvo	glȃvo	—	*golvo
sg	A	gálvą	gólovu	glȃvu	glȃvu	glavọ̑	*gȏlvǫ
sg	G	galvõs	golový	glávē	glāve᷉	glavẹ́	*golvỳ
sg	D	gálvai	golové (OESl. gólově)	glȃvi	glāvȉ	glávi	*gȏlvě → *golvě̀
sg	L	galvojè	golové	glávi	glāvȉ	glávi	*golvě̀
sg	I	gálva	golovój	glávōm	glāvũn	glavọ́	(*golvojǫ̀)
du	NAV	—	—	—	—	glavẹ́	*gȏlvě
du	GL	—	—	—	—	—	*golvù
du	DI	—	—	—	—	glaváma	*golvàma
pl	NV	gálvos	gólovy	glȃve	glȃve	glavẹ̑	*gȏlvy
pl	A	gálvas	gólovy	glȃve	glȃve	glavẹ̑	*gȏlvy
pl	G	galvų̃	golóv	glávā	glãv	gláv	*gólvъ
pl	D	galvóms	golovám	glávama	glāvãn	glavȁm	*golva̋mъ
pl	L	galvosè	golováx	glávama	glāvȁh	glavȁh	*golva̋xъ
pl	I	galvomìs	golovámi	glávama	glāvȁmi	glavȃmi	*golva̋mi

- Lithuanian has preserved the best Balto-Slavic mobile paradigm.
- The Proto-Slavic initial accent is preserved as a circumflex by Meillet's law.
- In Neoštokavian, the final accent has been retracted and gained rising intonation.
- In Slovene, several advancings and retractions of the accent have occurred so it no longer reflects the original position as neatly. All non-accented vowels were shortened, and all non-final accented vowels were lengthened.

== Later accentual developments ==
In the later Balto-Slavic languages, the acute articulation itself was often lost, leaving only the pitch distinction on accented syllables as the reflex. There, "acute" is only a type of pitch accent, rather than a specific articulatory feature. The Slavic languages have no trace of the acute articulation and preserve only tonal distinctions although most have since lost even those, in their development from Proto-Slavic. The East Baltic languages preserve some traces of the original acute articulation, in the form of the so-called "broken tone", the is a long vowel with a glottal stop in the middle of it, typically denoted by a circumflex diacritic, not to be confused with the circumflex accent: â [aˀa]. The broken tone is preserved in syllables in certain dialects of Latvian and Lithuanian. The broken tone can occur on unaccented syllables so it is not actually a tone but a register distinction, much like the Danish stød or the ngã tone in Northern Vietnamese.

The short accent was preserved as such in both the Baltic and Slavic languages, but its lengthening could be triggered by certain conditions. For example, in Lithuanian, vowels /a/ and /e/ were lengthened when they initially bore short accent in open syllable, and rising tone emerged, marked with tilde sign ã. Compare:

- PIE *kʷékʷlo- "circle, wheel" > Balto-Slavic *kákla- > Lithuanian kãklas "neck", Serbo-Croatian kȍlo.
- PIE *déḱm̥t "ten" > Balto-Slavic *déśimt > Lithuanian dẽšimt, Serbo-Croatian dȅset.

=== Latvian ===
The most direct continuation of the acute is in Latvian, particularly in the three-tone central dialects. There, the acute register is directly continued as a broken tone (lauztā) in originally unstressed syllables, marked with a circumflex diacritic: luôgs "window". In originally-stressed syllables, the acute register is continued as a rising or lengthened intonation (stieptā), marked with a tilde: luõks "spring onion". The circumflex register is generally continued as a falling intonation (krītošā), marked with a grave accent: lùoks "arch, bow". Unlike the others, the broken tone can occur on all syllables: locative plural gal̂vâs "in the heads" (compare: Lithuanian galvosè with stress on a short final vowel, deleted in Latvian), including monosyllables: dêt "to lay eggs" < *dêtì.

=== Lithuanian ===
In Lithuanian, the distinction between acute and circumflex is not preserved in unstressed syllables. In Standard Lithuanian, based on the Aukštaitian dialect, the acute becomes a falling tone (so-called "Lithuanian metatony") and is marked with an acute accent, and the circumflex becomes a rising tone, marked with a tilde. In diphthongs, the acute accent is placed on the first letter of the diphthong while the tilde marking rising tone (the original circumflex) is placed on the second letter. In diphthongs with a sonorant as a second part, the same convention is used, but the acute accent is replaced with a grave accent if the vowel is i or u: Lithuanian acute pìlnas 'full' < PIE *plh₁nos) vs. circumflex vil̃kas 'wolf' < PIE *wĺ̥kʷos. Word-finally, the acute was regularly shortened: gerà 'good' (indefinite adjective) : geróji 'the good' (definite adjective). That rule is called Leskien's law after the German neogrammarian August Leskien.

The shortening operated according to Leskien's law after the Lithuanian metatony. In monosyllabic words, the acute became circumflexed. Metatonical retraction of the accent from the final syllable to the penultimate syllable also created a circumflex automatically.

In the Žemaitian (Samogitian) dialects of Lithuanian, the usual reflex of Balto-Slavic acute in a stressed syllable is a broken tone like Latvian: Žemaitian (Kretinga) ộmž́iọs "age, century" = standard ámžius.

=== Old Prussian ===
In Old Prussian, the acute was reflected probably as a rising tone and circumflex as a falling tone. The marks on long vowels and diphthongs in Abel Will's translation of Martin Luther's Enchiridion point to that conclusion. It is the only accented Old Prussian text preserved. Diphthongs that correspond to a reconstructable Balto-Slavic acute are generally long in the second part of the diphthong, and those corresponding to a Balto–Slavic circumflex are generally long in the first part.

=== Slavic ===
In Proto-Slavic, the acute was lost as an articulatory feature and retained only as a tonal distinction on accented syllables. The acute produced a rising tone and the circumflex a falling tone, as in Latvian and Old Prussian.

Several developments in Late Common Slavic affected vowel length. Syllables that were originally short could lengthen, and those originally long could shorten. However, the long vowels also acquired different quality from the short ones so lengthenings and shortenings did not cause them to merge.

Instead, the vowels remained separate, causing the number of distinct vowels to almost double. Thus, differences vowel quality reflected older length distinctions while new vowel length distinctions were conditioned by accent type and placement. Consequently, in the Slavic languages that retain it, vowel length is often a suprasegmental feature tied to the accentual system rather phonemes. In Czech, Slovak and Old Polish, the mobile accent was lost in favour of fixed stress, which rephonemicised the older accentual length distinctions. Thus, the languages have long vowels as distinct phonemes, but they do not reflect the original Proto-Slavic length distinctions.

In all Slavic languages, the acute was shortened when it fell on a long vowel. A new rising accent (the "neoacute"), generally long, developed from retraction of the stress from a weak yer vowel (later usually lost). The short rising accent that developed from the old acute (and in some circumstances, the neoacute) was later lengthened again in a number of Slavic languages (such as Russian, Czech, Slovenian). The circumflex was shortened in some dialects as well (such as Polish, Russian, Czech, Slovak). Direct continuation of the acute vs. circumflex difference as a tonal distinction occurs only in archaic Serbo–Croatian dialects (such as Chakavian) and, to some extent, Slovenian (although the relationship between Slovenian and Proto-Slavic tones and accent position is complex).

In addition, the Proto-Slavic tonal distinction on liquid diphthongs is reflected fairly directly in Russian as a multisyllable accent shape (pleophony): *ôr (falling) > óro, *ór (rising) > oró. In some other languages (most notably Czech and standard Neoshtokavian Serbo-Croatian), the acute vs. circumflex distinction is continued as a length distinction (although in all languages, both long and short vowels have other sources as well). The length-from-tone distinction no longer exists in Russian.

Here is a table of basic accentual correspondences of the first syllable of a word:

	Balto-Slavic and Proto-Slavic	Lithuanian	Old Prussian	Latvian	Serbo-Croatian	Slovenian	Czech	Russian
acute	V́	V́	V̆V̄	Ṽ	V̏, V̀	V̏	V̄	VRV́
circumflex	V̑	Ṽ	V̄V̆	V̀	V̑, V́	V̑	V̆	V́RV

== Proto-Baltic and Proto-Slavic ==
Scholars raised questions regarding the possible relationship between Slavic and Baltic languages as early as the late 18th century. In 1802 the influential German scholar of Slavic languages and history August Ludwig von Schlözer described how his understanding of this relationship had changed over the years: whereas previously he had argued that the 'Latvian' or 'Old-Prussian' peoples spoke languages that belonged to the Slavic group, he had come to see them as an independent language family.

It was formerly thought that Balto-Slavic split into two branches, Baltic and Slavic, which both developed as a single common language for some time afterwards. More recently, scholarship suggests that Baltic was not a single branch of Balto-Slavic, with Old Prussian ("West Baltic") separate from Lithuanian and Latvian ("East Baltic").

== See also ==
- Balto-Slavic languages
- Slavic languages
- Proto-Slavic language
- Baltic languages
- Proto-Baltic language
- Glossary of sound laws in the Indo-European languages § Balto-Slavic
