= Ola Bratteli =

Norwegian mathematician (1946–2015)

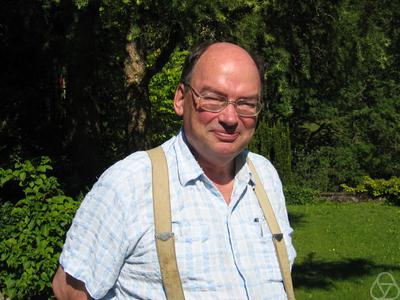
- Born: 24 October 1946; Oslo, Norway
- Died: 8 February 2015 (aged 68); Oslo, Norway
- Occupation: Mathematician
- Parent(s): Trygve Bratteli (father); Randi Bratteli (mother)

Ola Bratteli (24 October 1946 – 8 February 2015) was a Norwegian mathematician.

He was a son of Trygve Bratteli and Randi Bratteli (née Larssen). He received a PhD degree in 1974. He was appointed as professor at the University of Trondheim in 1980 and at the University of Oslo in 1991. He was a member of the Norwegian Academy of Science and Letters.

== Selected works ==
- with Derek W. Robinson: Operator Algebras and Quantum Statistical Mechanics (Springer-Verlag, 2 volumes, 1980)
- Derivations, Dissipations and Group Actions on C*-algebras (Springer-Verlag, 1986)
- with Palle T. Jørgensen: Wavelets through a looking glass, the world of the spectrum (Birkhäuser, 2002)

== See also ==
- Approximately finite-dimensional C*-algebra
- Bratteli diagram
- Bratteli–Vershik diagram

Awards
Preceded by Per Brandtzæg	Recipient of the Fridtjof Nansen Excellent Research Award in Science; 2004	Succeeded by Hans Prydz
