= Indo-Semitic languages =

Obsolete language hypothesis

Indo-Semitic
- (not widely accepted)
- Geographic distribution: North Africa, Europe, Middle East, Indian subcontinent
- Linguistic classification: Afroasiatic
- Subdivisions: Indo-European; Semitic

Language codes
- Glottolog: None

The Indo-Semitic hypothesis maintains that a genetic relationship exists between Indo-European and Semitic languages, and that the Indo-European and the Semitic language families both descend from a common root ancestral language. The theory is not widely accepted by contemporary linguists, but historically, it had a number of advocates and supporting arguments, particularly in the 19th and 20th centuries.

== History of the term and of the idea ==
The term "Indo-Semitic" was first used by Graziadio Ascoli, a leading advocate of this relationship. Although this term has been used by a number of scholars since, there is no universally accepted term for this grouping at the present time. In German, the term indogermanisch-semitisch, 'Indo-Germanic–Semitic', has often been used, in which indogermanisch is a synonym of "Indo-European".

Several phases in the development of the Indo-Semitic hypothesis can be distinguished.

=== A proposed relationship between Indo-European and Semitic ===
In a first phase, a few scholars in the 19th century argued that the Indo-European languages were related to the Semitic languages. The first to do so was Johann Christoph Adelung in his work Mithridates. However, the first to do so in a scientific way was Richard Lepsius in 1836. The arguments presented for a relationship between Indo-European and Semitic in the 19th century were commonly rejected by Indo-Europeanists, including W.D. Whitney and August Schleicher. The culmination of this first phase in Indo-Semitic studies was Hermann Möller's comparative dictionary of Indo-European and Semitic, first published in Danish in 1909.

A succinct history of the Indo-Semitic hypothesis is provided by Alan S. Kaye in a review of Allan Bomhard's Toward Proto-Nostratic:

A proposed relationship between Indo-European and Semitic goes back some 125 years to R. von Raumer [note: Lepsius, though, is earlier than that]; but it was G.I. Ascoli who, after examining many items, declared in 1864 that these language families were genetically related. However, A. Schleicher denied the relationship. Scholars waited for a systematic study of IE-Semitic vocabulary until 1873, when F. Delitzsch published his Studien über indogermanisch-semitische Wurzelverwandtschaft; this was followed in 1881 by J. McCurdy's Aryo-Semitic Speech. C. Abel's 400-page dictionary of Egyptian-Semitic-IE roots appeared in 1884. Work by 20th century linguists who have investigated the problem more thoroughly with Afro-Asiatic and/or Semitic data include H. Möller, A. Cuny (in a series of publications from 1912 through 1946, all used by Bomhard), L. Brunner, C. Hodge, S. Levin, A. Dolgopol′skij, V.M. Illič-Svityč, and K. Koskinen.

=== A larger grouping ===
In the mid-19th century, Friedrich Müller argued that the Semitic languages were related to a large group of African languages, which he termed Hamitic. This implied a larger grouping, Indo-European–Hamito-Semitic. However, the concept of Hamitic was deeply flawed, relying in part on racial criteria rather than linguistic ones. In 1950, Joseph Greenberg showed that the Hamitic grouping needed to be split up, with only some of the languages it concerned groupable with Semitic. He named this greatly modified grouping Afroasiatic. In principle, then, Indo-European—Hamito-Semitic was replaced by Indo-European–Afroasiatic.

However, Greenberg also argued that the relevant question was not whether Indo-European was related to Afroasiatic but how it was related, such as whether the two form a valid node in a language family tree or were more distantly related. Since the 1980s, adherents of the controversial Nostratic hypothesis, who accept a relationship between Indo-European and Afroasiatic, have begun to move away from the view that Indo-European and Afroasiatic share an especially close relationship, and to consider that they are only related at a higher level.

=== Continued comparison of Indo-European and Semitic ===
Although it might seem that the logical connection to pursue was that between Indo-European and Hamito-Semitic or, later, Indo-European and Afroasiatic (ib. 336), in practice scholars interested in this comparison continued to compare Indo-European and Semitic directly. One reason for this seems to be that the study of Semitic had progressed far beyond that of "Hamitic" or, later, Afroasiatic. According to Albert Cuny, who accepted the validity of the Hamito-Semitic grouping:

[I]n the Semitic field, the exact knowledge that now exists ... makes it possible to deal with questions of vocalism almost as well as in the field of Indo-European. This is the justification for the present study.

=== Direct comparison of Indo-European and Afroasiatic ===
A new departure was represented by the first installment of Vladislav Illich-Svitych's Nostratic dictionary in 1971, edited by Vladimir Dybo after Illich-Svitych's untimely death. Rather than comparing Indo-European to Semitic, Illich-Svitych compared it to Afroasiatic directly, using his reconstruction of Afroasiatic phonology. This approach has been taken subsequently by other Nostraticists.

=== Incorporation of Indo-European into a larger language family (Eurasiatic) ===
In the 1980s, some linguists, notably Joseph Greenberg and Sergei Starostin, began to identify Afroasiatic as a language family considerably more ancient than Indo-European, directly related not to Indo-European but to an earlier grouping from which Indo-European was descended, which Greenberg termed Eurasiatic. This view has been accepted by several Nostraticists, including Allan Bomhard.

=== Conclusion ===
The Indo-Semitic hypothesis has thus undergone a paradigm shift. From Lepsius in 1836 through the mid-20th century, the question asked was whether Indo-European and Semitic are related or unrelated, and in attempting to answer this question Indo-European and Semitic were compared directly. This now appears naive, and the relevant units of comparison instead appear to be Eurasiatic and Afroasiatic, the immediate precursors of Indo-European (controversially) and Semitic (uncontroversially). This revised schema still has a long road to go if it is to win general acceptance from the linguistic community.

== See also ==
- Nostratic languages
- Afroasiatic languages
- Indo-European languages
- Indo-Uralic languages

== Bibliography of Indo-Semitic studies ==
- Abel, Carl. 1884. Einleitung in ein ägyptisch-semitisch-indoeuropäisches Wurzelwörterbuch. Leipzig.
- Abel, Carl. 1889. Über Wechselbeziehungen der ägyptischen, indoeuropäischen und semitischen Etymologie I. Leipzig.
- Abel, Carl. 1896. Ägyptisch und indogermanisch. Frankfurt.
- Ascoli, Graziadio Isaia. 1864a. "Del nesso ario-semitico. Lettera al professore Adalberto Kuhn di Berlino." Il Politecnico 21:190–216.
- Ascoli, Graziadio Isaia. 1864b. "Del nesso ario-semitico. Lettera seconda al professore Francesco Bopp." Il Politecnico 22:121–151.
- Ascoli, Graziadio Isaia. 1867. "Studj ario-semitici." Memorie del Reale Istituto Lombardo, cl. II, 10:1–36.
- Bomhard, Allan R. 1975. "An outline of the historical phonology of Indo-European." Orbis 24.2:354-390.
- Bomhard, Allan R. 1984. Toward Proto-Nostratic: A New Approach to the Comparison of Proto-Indo-European and Proto-Afroasiatic. Amsterdam: John Benjamins.
- Bomhard, Allan R. 2008. Reconstructing Proto-Nostratic: Comparative Phonology, Morphology, and Vocabulary, 2 volumes. Leiden: Brill.
- Brunner, Linus. 1969. Die gemeinsam Wurzeln des semitischen und indogermanischen Wortschatzes. Bern: Francke.
- Cuny, Albert. 1914. "Notes de phonétique historique. Indo-européen et sémitique." Revue de phonétique 2:101–132.
- Cuny, Albert. 1924. Etudes prégrammaticales sur le domaine des langues indo-européennes et chamito-sémitiques. Paris: Champion.
- Cuny, Albert. 1931. "Contribution à la phonétique comparée de l'indo-européen et du chamito-sémitique." Bulletin de la Société de linguistique 32:29–33.
- Cuny, Albert. 1943. Recherches sur le vocalisme, le consonantisme et la formation des racines en « nostratique », ancêtre de l'indo-européen et du chamito-sémitique. Paris: Adrien Maisonneuve.
- Cuny, Albert. 1946. Invitation à l'étude comparative des langues indo-européennes et des langues chamito-sémitiques. Bordeaux: Brière.
- Delitzsch, Friedrich. 1873. Studien über indogermanisch-semitische Wurzelverwandtschaft. Leipzig: J.C. Hinrichs'sche Buchhandlung.
- Hodge, Carleton T. 1998. Review essay on Semitic and Indo-European: The Principal Etymologies, With Observations on Afro-Asiatic by Saul Levin. Anthropological Linguistics 40.2, 318–332.
- Kaye, Alan S. 1985. Review of Toward Proto-Nostratic by Allan R. Bomhard (Amsterdam: John Benjamins, 1984). Language 61.4, 887–891.
- Koskinen, Kalevi E. 1980. Nilal: Über die Urverwandtschaft des Hamito-Semitischen, Indogermanischen, Uralischen und Altäischen. Helsinki: Akateeminem Kirjakauppa.
- Lepsius, (Karl) Richard. 1836. Zwei sprachvergleichende Abhandlungen. 1. Über die Anordnung und Verwandtschaft des Semitischen, Indischen, Äthiopischen, Alt-Persischen und Alt-Ägyptischen Alphabets. 2. Über den Ursprung und die Verwandtschaft der Zahlwörter in der Indogermanischen, Semitischen und der Koptischen Sprache. Berlin: Ferdinand Dümmler.
- Levin, Saul. 1971. The Indo-European and Semitic Languages: An Exploration of Structural Similarities Related to Accent, Chiefly in Greek, Sanskrit, and Hebrew. State University of New York Press.
- Levin, Saul. 1995. Semitic and Indo-European, Volume 1: The Principal Etymologies, With Observations on Afro-Asiatic. John Benjamins Publishing Company.
- Levin, Saul. 2002. Semitic and Indo-European, Volume 2: Comparative Morphology, Syntax and Phonetics. John Benjamins Publishing Company.
- McCurdy, James Frederick. 1881. Aryo-Semitic Speech: A Study in Linguistic Archaeology. Andover: Warren F. Draper.
- Möller, Hermann. 1906. Semitisch und Indogermanisch. Teil l. Konsonanten. (Only volume to appear of a projected longer work.) Kopenhagen: H. Hagerup, 1906. (Reprint: 1978. Hildesheim – New York: Georg Olms.)
- Møller, Hermann. 1909. Indoeuropæisk–Semitik Sammenlignende Glossarium. Kjøbenhavn: Kjøbenhavns Universitet.
- Möller, Hermann. 1911. Vergleichendes indogermanisch-semitisches Wörterbuch. Kopenhagen. (Reprint: 1970, reissued 1997. Göttingen: Vandenhoeck and Ruprecht. German edition of the previous.)
- Möller, Hermann. 1917. Die semitisch-vorindogermanischen laryngalen Konsonanten. København: Andr. Fred. Høst.
- Pedersen, Holger. 1908. "Die indogermanisch-semitische Hypothese und die indogermanische Lautlehre." Indogermanische Forschungen 22, 341–365.
- Pedersen, Holger. 1931. Linguistic Science in the Nineteenth Century: Methods and Results, translated from the Danish by John Webster Spargo. Cambridge, Massachusetts: Harvard University Press.
- Raumer, Rudolf von. 1863. "Untersuchungen über die Urverwandtschaft der semitischen und indoeuropäischen Sprachen", in the author's Gesammelte Sprachwissenschafliche Abhandlungen, pages 461–539. Frankfurt: Heyder und Zimmer.
- Raumer, Rudolf von. 1864. Herr Professor Schleicher in Jena und Die Urverwandtschaft der semitischen und indoeuropäischen Sprachen. Ein kritisches Bedenken. Frankfurt: Heyder und Zimmer.
- Raumer, Rudolf von. 1867. Fortsetzung der Untersuchungen über die Urverwandtschaft der semitischen und indoeuropäischen Sprachen. Frankfurt: Heyder und Zimmer.
- Raumer, Rudolf von. 1868. Zweite Fortsetzung der Untersuchungen über die Urverwandtschaft der semitischen und indoeuropäischen Sprachen. Frankfurt: Heyder und Zimmer.
- Raumer, Rudolf von. 1871. Dritte Fortsetzung der Untersuchungen über die Urverwandtschaft der semitischen und indoeuropäischen Sprachen. Frankfurt: Heyder und Zimmer.
- Raumer, Rudolf von. 1873. Vierte Fortsetzung der Untersuchungen über die Urverwandtschaft der semitischen und indoeuropäischen Sprachen. Frankfurt: Heyder und Zimmer.
- Raumer, Rudolf von. 1876. Sendschreiben an Herrn Professor Whitney über die Urverwandtschaft der semitischen und indogermanischen Sprachen. Frankfurt: Heyder und Zimmer.
- Wüllner, Franz. 1838. Über die Verwandtschaft des Indogermanischen, Semitischen und Thibetanischen. Münster.
