= Laryngeal theory =

Theory in historical linguistics

Overall extent of the Indo-European languages in Eurasia, Proto-Indo-European Urheimat in dark green and modern-day extent in light green.

The laryngeal theory is a widely accepted scientific theory in historical linguistics positing that the Proto-Indo-European (PIE) language included a series of consonants that left no direct consonantal descendants in languages outside of the Anatolian branch. It was first proposed by the Swiss linguist Ferdinand de Saussure in 1879 to explain apparent irregularities in morphophonological patterns in daughter languages. The theory allowed for a better reconstruction of PIE ablaut and root; however, at the time there was no direct evidence of the proposed sounds in any of the daughter languages. This changed in 1927 when a Polish linguist, Jerzy Kuryłowicz, discovered that a sound transcribed as ḫ in the newly deciphered ancient Indo-European Hittite language appears in many of the places that the laryngeal theory predicted.

Subsequent scholarly work has established a set of rules by which an increasing number of reflexes in daughter languages may be derived from PIE roots. The number of explanations thus achieved and the simplicity of the postulated system have led to widespread acceptance of the theory.

== Conversion from consonants to vowels ==
The reconstructed sounds are traditionally called "laryngeals" and are known to have been consonants, most likely fricatives; however, their exact place of articulation is debated. In its most widely accepted version, the theory posits three laryngeal phonemes in PIE. They are represented abstractly as:

- *h₁
- *h₂
- *h₃

(also written *H₁, *H₂, *H₃ or *ə₁, *ə₂, *ə₃, among other notations).

Aside from some direct consonantal reflexes in the Anatolian branch, in all branches, through regular sound changes, the laryngeals were turned into vowels or were lost entirely, influencing the place of articulation or length of neighbouring vowels.

== History ==
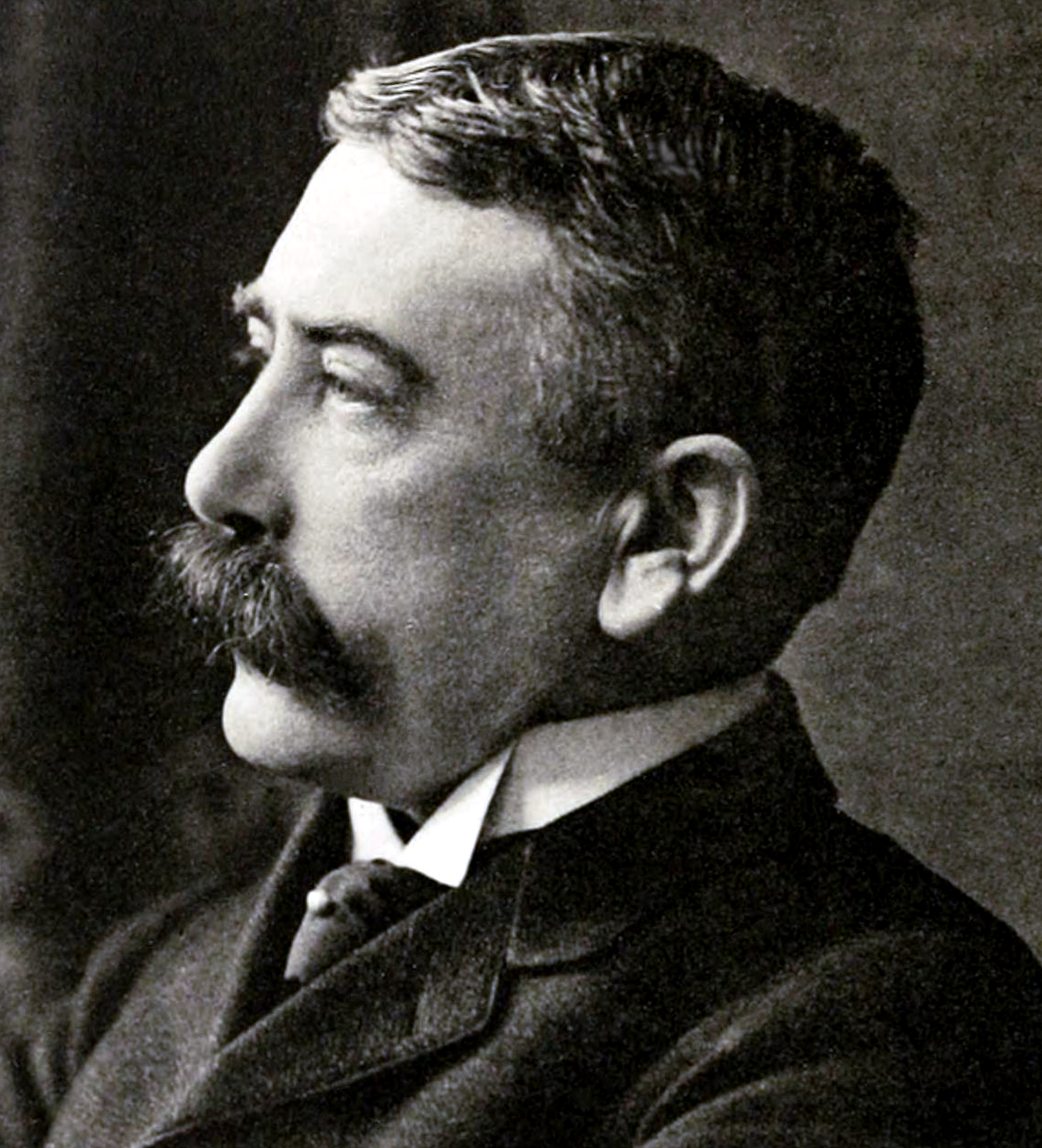
Ferdinand de Saussure

The beginnings of the theory were proposed by Ferdinand de Saussure in his 1879 monograph Mémoire sur le système primitif des voyelles dans les langues indo-européennes ('A Dissertation on the Primitive System of Vowels in the Indo-European Languages'). In it, he argued that unknown phonemes – called coefficients sonantiques ('sonantic coefficients') – were elided in certain ablauting forms, giving rise to long vowels. These phonemes were such that when they abutted the preceding vowel, they were functionally identical to diphthongs or vowel–sonorant strings.

In the course of his analysis, Saussure proposed that what had then been reconstructed as long vowels *ā and *ō, alternating with *ǝ, was an ordinary type of PIE ablaut. That is, it was an alternation between e grade and zero grade like in "regular" ablaut (further explanations below), but followed by a previously unidentified element. This element accounted for both the changed vowel colour and the lengthening (short *e becoming long *ā or *ō).

So, rather than reconstructing *ā, *ō, and *ǝ as others had done before, Saussure proposed *eA alternating with *A and *eO with *O, where *A and *O represented the unidentified elements. Saussure called them simply coefficients sonantiques, which was the term for what are now in English more usually called resonants; that is, the six elements present in PIE which can be either consonants (non-syllabic) or vowels (syllabic) depending on the sounds they are adjacent to: *y, *w, *r, *l, *m, and *n.

These views were accepted by a few scholars, in particular Hermann Möller, who added important elements to the theory. Saussure's observations, however, did not achieve any general currency, as they were still too abstract and had little direct evidence to back them up.

This changed when Hittite was discovered and deciphered in the early 20th century. Hittite phonology included two sounds written with symbols from the Akkadian syllabary conventionally transcribed as ḫ, as in te-iḫ-ḫi 'I put, am putting'. This consonant did not appear to be related to any of the consonants then reconstructed for PIE, and various unsatisfactory proposals were made to explain this consonant in terms of the PIE consonant system as it had then been reconstructed.

It remained for Jerzy Kuryłowicz to propose that these sounds lined up with Saussure's conjectures. He suggested that the unknown consonant of Hittite was, in fact, a direct reflex of the coefficients sonantiques that Saussure had proposed.

Their appearance explained some other matters as well. As an example, most verb roots were reconstructed with both initial and final consonants, but some were instead reconstructed with no final consonant; the latter always bore a long vowel, never short, as in *dō- "give". The newly reconstructed laryngeals allowed linguists to decompose this further into *deh₃-. This not only accounted for the patterns of alternation more economically than before (by requiring fewer types of ablaut) but also brought the structure of these roots into line with the basic PIE pattern which required roots to begin and end with a consonant.

The lateness of the discovery of these sounds by Indo-Europeanists is largely because Hittite and the other Anatolian languages are the only Indo-European languages for which at least some are attested directly and consistently as consonantal sounds. Otherwise, their presence is to be inferred mostly through the effects they have on neighboring sounds and on patterns of alternation that they participate in. When a laryngeal is attested directly, it is usually as a special type of vowel and not as a consonant, best exemplified in Greek where syllabic laryngeals (when they appeared next to only consonants) developed as such: *h₁ > e, *h₂ > a, and *h₃ > o.

== Varieties of laryngeals ==
There are many variations of the laryngeal theory. Some scholars, such as Oswald Szemerényi, reconstruct just one laryngeal. Some follow Jaan Puhvel's reconstruction of eight or more.

=== Basic laryngeal set ===
Most scholars work with a basic three:

- *h₁, the neutral laryngeal
- *h₂, the a-colouring laryngeal
- *h₃, the o-colouring laryngeal

=== Additional laryngeals ===
- *h₄

Some scholars suggest the existence of a fourth consonant, *h₄, which differs from *h₂ in not being reflected as Anatolian ḫ but being reflected, to the exclusion of all other laryngeals, as Albanian h when word-initial before an originally stressed vowel.

E.g. PIE *h₄órǵʰiyeh₂ 'testicle' yields Albanian herdhe 'testicle' but Hittite arki- 'testicle' whereas PIE *h₂ŕ̥tkos 'bear' yields Albanian ari 'bear' but Hittite hart(ag)ga- (=/hartka-/) 'cultic official, bear-person'. However, this may be contestable as h- has also arisen elsewhere idiosyncratically in Albanian (for example Alb. hark < Lat. arcus).

When there is an uncertainty whether the laryngeal is *h₂ or *h₄, the symbol *h_{a} may be used.

- *h₁ doublet

Another such theory, but much less generally accepted, is Winfred P. Lehmann's view, based on inconsistent reflexes in Hittite, that *h₁ was two separate sounds. (He assumed that one was a glottal stop and the other a glottal fricative.)

== Direct evidence for laryngeals ==
Some direct evidence for laryngeal consonants comes from Anatolian. In PIE *a is a fairly rare sound, and in an uncommonly large number of good etymologies, it is word-initial. Thus PIE (traditional) *anti 'in front of and facing' >

- Greek antí 'against'
- Latin ante 'in front of, before'
- Sanskrit ánti 'near; in the presence of'.

But in Hittite there is the noun ḫants 'front, face', with various derivatives (ḫantezzi 'first', and so on), pointing to a PIE root-noun *h₂ent- 'face' (of which *h₂enti would be the locative singular).

However, it does not follow that all reconstructed forms with initial *a should automatically be rewritten *h₂e.

Similarly, the traditional PIE reconstruction for 'sheep' is *owi- (a y-stem, not an i-stem) whence Sanskrit ávi-, Latin ovis, Greek ὄϊς. But Luwian has ḫawi-, indicating instead the reconstruction *h₃ewis.

=== Lyco-Carian chain shift ===
In the Anatolian languages Lycian and Carian, there was a chain shift such that *h₂ > k > c. In other words, PIE *h₂ is reflected as /k/ in these languages, and PIE *k as /c/. Alwin Kloekhorst takes this as evidence that PIE *h₂ originally had a value of /q/, but Martin Joachim Kümmel is skeptical of Kloekhorst's hypothesis and prefers to model the laryngeals as fricatives.

== Pronunciation ==
Considerable debate still surrounds the pronunciation of the laryngeals and various arguments have been given to pinpoint their exact place of articulation. According to the linguist Donald Ringe, it can be concluded with great certainty that all the laryngeals were obstruents, as they abide by the known rules of Proto-Indo-European obstruent syllabification. Further evidence regarding the pronunciation of the laryngeals may derive from their effects on adjacent phonemes. The evidence from Hittite and Uralic is sufficient to conclude that these sounds were guttural, pronounced rather back in the vocal tract. The same evidence is also consistent with the assumption that they were fricative sounds (as opposed to approximants or stops), an assumption that is strongly supported by the behaviour of laryngeals in consonant clusters, which is comparable to that of the coronal fricative *s.

=== *h₁ ===
J. E. Rasmussen suggested a consonantal realization for *h₁ as the voiceless glottal fricative [h] with a syllabic allophone [ə] (mid central unrounded vowel).This is supported by the closeness of [ə] to [e] (with which it combines in Greek), its failure (unlike *h₂ and *h₃) to create an auxiliary vowel in Greek and Tocharian when it occurs between a semivowel and a consonant, and the typological likelihood of an [h] given the presence of aspirated consonants in PIE.

Winfred Lehmann theorized, based on inconsistent reflexes in Hittite, that there were two *h₁ sounds: a glottal stop [ʔ] and an h sound [h] as in English hat. Robert S. P. Beekes suggested that *h₁ is always a glottal stop [ʔ].

Alwin Kloekhorst argued that the Hieroglyphic Luwian sign no. 19 (𔐓, conventionally transcribed á) stood for /ʔa/ (distinct from /a/, sign no. 450: 𔗷 a) and represents the reflex of *h₁; this would support the hypothesis that *h₁ was, at least in some cases, [ʔ]. Later, Kloekhorst claimed that also Hittite preserves PIE *h₁ as a glottal stop [ʔ], visible in words like Hittite e-eš-zi 'he is' < PIE *h₁és-ti, where an extra initial vowel sign (plene spelling) is used. This hypothesis has been met with serious criticism; e.g., from Elisabeth Rieken, Craig Melchert, and Mark Weeden.

Zsolt Simon supported Kloekhorst's thesis by suggesting that plene spelling in Cuneiform Luwian can be explained in a similar way. Additionally, Simon's 2013 article revises the Hieroglyphic Luwian evidence and concludes that although some details of Kloekhorst's arguments could not be maintained, his theory can be confirmed.

An idea occasionally advanced that the laryngeals were dorsal fricatives corresponding directly to the three traditionally reconstructed series of dorsal stops (palatal, velar, and labiovelar; i.e., that the laryngeals *h₁, *h₂, and *h₃ are more accurately written *h́, *h, and *hʷ respectively) suggests a further possibility, a palatal fricative [ç(ʶ)].

=== *h₂ ===
From what is known of such phonetic conditioning in contemporary languages, notably Semitic languages, *h₂ (the a-colouring laryngeal) could have been a pharyngeal fricative such as [ħ] and [ʕ]. Pharyngeal consonants (like heth in the Semitic abjads) often cause a-colouring in the Semitic languages.

Uvular fricatives may also colour vowels; thus, [χ] is also a noteworthy candidate. Weiss suggests that this was the case in Proto-Indo-European proper, and that a shift from uvular into pharyngeal [ħ] may have been a common innovation of the non-Anatolian languages (before the consonant's eventual loss). Rasmussen suggested a consonantal realization for *h₂ as a voiceless velar fricative [x], with a syllabic allophone [ɐ], i.e. a near-open central vowel.

Kloekhorst proposes, based on evidence from Anatolian languages, that *h₂ was originally a geminate uvular stop [qː] (he also holds the view that the traditionally voiceless stops of PIE were in fact geminate, as in Hittite), although he judges it plausible that already in PIE it had a fricative allophone.

=== *h₃ ===
Likewise it is generally assumed that *h₃ was rounded (labialized) due to its o-colouring effects. It is often taken to have been voiced based on the perfect form *pi-bh₃- from the root *peh₃ 'drink' and Cowgill's law in Proto-Germanic (PIE *n̥h₃we → PPGmc *ungwe → PGmc *unki, "us two"). Rasmussen chose a consonantal realization for *h₃ as a voiced labialized velar fricative [ɣʷ], with a syllabic allophone [ɵ], i.e. a close-mid central rounded vowel. Kümmel instead suggests [ʁ].

Kloekhorst reconstructs [qʷː] as the basic value, which in his view would be the labialized counterpart to *h₂ (see above).

== Support for theory from daughter languages ==
The hypothetical existence of laryngeals in PIE finds support in the body of daughter language cognates which can be most efficiently explained through simple rules of development.

=== Direct reflexes of laryngeals ===
Unambiguous examples are confined to Anatolian languages. Words with Hittite ḫ (hh), Luwian h, and Lycian x are explained as reflexes of PIE roots with *h₂.

Reflexes of h₂ in Anatolian
PIE root	Meaning	Anatolian reflex	Cognates
*peh₂-(s)	'protect'	Hittite paḫḫs-	English fee, Sanskrit pā́ti, Latin pascere (pastus), Greek patéomai
*dʰewh₂-	'breath/smoke'	Hittite tuḫḫāi-	Sanskrit dhūmá-, Latin fūmus, Greek thūmos
*h₂ent-	'front'	Hittite ḫant-	Sanskrit ánti, Latin ante, Greek antí
*h₂erǵ-	'white/silver'	Hittite ḫarki-	Sanskrit árjuna, Latin argentum, Greek árguron, Tocharian A ārki
*h₂owi-	'sheep'	Luwian hawi-, Lycian xawa-	English ewe, Sanskrit ávi-, Latin ovis, Greek ó(w)is
*péh₂wr̥	'fire'	Hittite paḫḫur, Luwian pāḫur	English fire, Tocharian B puwar, Greek pûr
*h₂wéh₁n̥t-	'wind'	Hittite ḫūwant-	English wind, Tocharian A want, Latin ventus, Greek aént-, Sanskrit vāt-
*h₂stér	'star'	Hittite ḫasterz	English star, Sanskrit stā́, Latin stella, Greek astḗr
*h₂ŕ̥tḱo	'bear'	Hittite ḫartaggaš	Sanskrit ṛ́kṣa, Latin ursus, Greek árktos
*h₂ewh₂os	'grandfather'	Hittite ḫuḫḫa-, Luwian ḫuḫa-, Lycian χuge-	Gothic awo, Latin avus, Armenian haw

Some Hittitologists have also proposed that *h₃ was preserved in Hittite as ḫ, although only word-initially and after a resonant. Kortlandt holds that *h₃ was preserved before all vowels except *o. Similarly, Kloekhorst believes they were lost before resonants as well.

Reflexes of h₃ in Anatolian
PIE root	Meaning	Anatolian reflex	Cognates
*welh₃-	'to hit'	Hittite walḫ-	Latin vellō, Greek ealōn
*h₃ésth₁	'bone'	Hittite ḫaštāi	Latin os, Greek ostéon, Sanskrit ásthi
*h₃erbʰ-	'to change status'	Hittite ḫarp-	Latin orbus, Greek orphanós
*h₃eron-	'eagle'	Hittite ḫara(n)-	Gothic ara, Greek órnīs
*h₃pus-	'to have sex'	Hittite ḫapuš-	Greek opuíō
*h₃ewi-	'sheep'	Luwian hawi-, Lycian xawa-	Sanskrit ávi-, Latin ovis, Greek ó(w)is

==== In Germanic ====
Reconstructed instances of Proto-Germanic: *kw in Proto-Germanic have been explained as reflexes of PIE *h₃w (and possibly *h₂w), a process known as Cowgill's law. The proposal has been challenged but is defended by Don Ringe.

Examples
PIE	Total H-loss	* H > *k	Reflexes
*n̥h₃we ('us two')	Sanskrit āvā́m Greek *nōwe > νώ nṓ	P-Gmc *unk(iz) (< *unkw)	Gothic ugkis Old English unc
*gʷih₃wós ('alive')	Sanskrit jīvás Latin vīvus	P-Gmc *kʷikʷaz	Old Norse kvíkr Old English cwic

==== In Albanian ====
In the Albanian language, a minority view proposes that some instances of word-initial h continue a laryngeal consonant.

PIE root	Meaning	Albanian	Other cognates
*h₁órǵʰis	testicles	herdhe	Greek orkhis
*h₁ed-	to eat	ha	Ancient Greek édō
*h₂eydʰ	to ignite	hith	Ancient Greek aíthō

==== In Western Iranian ====
Martin Kümmel has proposed that some initial [x] and [h] in contemporary Western Iranian languages, commonly thought to be prothetic, are instead direct survivals of *h₂, lost in epigraphic Old Persian but retained in marginal dialects ancestral among others to Modern Persian.

PIE root	Meaning	Modern Persian
*h₂ŕ̥tḱo-	'bear'	xers
*h₂oHmo-	'raw'	xâm
*h₂eh₁s-	'ashes'	xâk 'dust, earth'
*h₂eydʰ-smo-	'ignite'	hêzom 'firewood'
*h₁eyh₂s-mo- (Note: [sic], with *h₁ (Kümmel's h, versus χ = *h₂).)	'passion'	xešm 'anger'

=== Proposed indirect reflexes ===
In all other daughter languages, a comparison of the cognates can support only hypothetical intermediary sounds derived from PIE combinations of vowels and laryngeals. Some indirect reflexes are required to support the examples above where the existence of laryngeals is uncontested.

PIE	Intermediary	Reflexes
*eh₂	ā	ā, a, ahh
*uh₂	u	ū, uhh
*h₂e	a	a, ā
*h₂o	o	o, a

The proposals in this table account only for attested forms in daughter languages. Extensive scholarship has produced a large body of cognates which may be identified as reflexes of a small set of hypothetical intermediary sounds, including those in the table above. Individual sets of cognates are explicable by other hypotheses but the sheer bulk of data and the elegance of the laryngeal explanation have led to widespread acceptance in principle.

==== Vowel coloration and lengthening ====
In the proposed Anatolian-language reflexes above, only some of the vowel sounds reflect PIE *e. In the daughter languages in general, many vowel sounds are not obvious reflexes. The theory explains this as the result of H coloration and H loss.

1 H coloration. PIE *e is coloured (i.e. its sound value is changed) before or after *h₂ and *h₃, but not when next to *h₁.

Laryngeal precedes	Laryngeal follows
*h₁e > *h₁e	*eh₁ > *eh₁
*h₂e > *h₂a	*eh₂ > *ah₂
*h₃e > *h₃o	*eh₃ > *oh₃

2 H loss. Any of the three laryngeals (symbolized here as H) is lost before a short vowel. Laryngeals are also lost before another consonant (symbolized here as C), with consequent lengthening of the preceding vowel.

Before vowel	Before consonant
He > e	eHC > ēC
Ha > a	aHC > āC
Ho > o	oHC > ōC
Hi > i	iHC > īC
Hu > u	uHC > ūC

The results of H coloration and H loss are recognized in daughter-language reflexes such as those in the table below:

After vowels
Change	PIE	Latin	Sanskrit	Greek	Hittite
*iH > *ī	*gʷih₂-wós	vīvus	jīva	bíos	
*uH > *ū	*dʰweh₂-	fūmus	dhūma	thūmós	tuwaḫḫaš
*oH > *ō	*sóh₂wl̥	sōl	sū́rya	hḗlios	
*eh₁ > *ē	*séh₁-mn̥	sēmen		hêma	
*eh₂ > *ā	*peh₂-(s)-	pāscere (pastus)	pā́ti	patéomai	paḫḫas
*eh₃ > *ō	*deh₃-r/n	dōnum	dāna	dôron	

Before vowels
Change	PIE	Latin	Sanskrit	Greek	Hittite
*Hi > *i	*h₁íteros	iterum	ítara		
*Hu > *u	*pélh₁us	plūs	purú-	polús	
*Ho > *o	*h₂owi-	ovis	ávi	ó(w)is	Luw. ḫawa
*h₁e > *e	*h₁ésti	est	ásti	ésti	ēšzi
*h₂e > *a	*h₂ent	ante	ánti	antí	ḫanti
*h₂e > *a	*h₂erǵ-	argentum	árjuna	árguron	ḫarki
*h₃e > *o	*h₃érbʰ-	orbus	arbhas	orphanós	ḫarp-

==== Greek triple reflex vs schwa ====
Between three phonological contexts, Greek reflexes display a regular vowel pattern that is absent from the supposed cognates in other daughter languages.

Before the development of laryngeal theory, scholars compared Greek, Latin, and Sanskrit (then considered earliest daughter languages) and concluded the existence in these contexts of a schwa (ə) vowel in PIE, the schwa indogermanicum. The contexts are: 1. between consonants (short vowel); 2. word initial before a consonant (short vowel); 3. combined with a liquid or nasal consonant [r, l, m, n] (long vowel).

1 Between consonants

Latin displays a and Sanskrit i, whereas Greek displays e, a, or o.

2 Word initial before a consonant

Greek alone displays e, a, or o.

3 Combined with a liquid or nasal

Latin displays a liquid/nasal consonant followed by ā; Sanskrit displays either īr/ūr or the vowel ā alone; Greek displays a liquid/nasal consonant followed by ē, ā (in dialects such as Doric), or ō.

Laryngeal theory provides a more elegant general description than reconstructed schwa by assuming that the Greek vowels are derived through vowel colouring and H loss from PIE *h₁, *h₂, and *h₃, constituting a triple reflex.

		*CHC	*HC-	*r̥H	*l̥H	*m̥H	*n̥H
Greek	*h₁	e	e	rē	lē	mē	nē
Greek	*h₂	a	a	rā	lā	mā	nā
Greek	*h₃	o	o	rō	lō	mō	nō
Latin		a	lost	rā	lā	mā	nā
Sanskrit		i	lost	īr/ūr	īr/ūr	ā	ā

1 Between consonants

An explanation is provided for the existence of three vowel reflexes in Greek corresponding to single reflexes in Latin and in Sanskrit.

2 Word initial

The assumption of *HC- in PIE yields an explanation for a dichotomy exhibited below between cognates in the Anatolian, Greek, and Armenian languages reflexes with initial a and cognates in the remaining daughters which lack that syllable, The theory assumes initial *h₂e in the PIE root, which has been lost in most of the daughter languages.

*h₂ster- 'star': Hittite hasterza, Greek astḗr, Armenian astł, Latin stella, Sanskrit tár-

*h₂wes 'live, spend time': Hittite huis- 'live', Greek á(w)esa 'I spent a night', Sanskrit vásati 'spend the night', English was

*h₂ner- 'man': Greek anḗr, Armenian ayr (from *anir), Oscan niir, Sanskrit nár

3 Combined with a liquid or nasal

These presumed sonorant reflexes are completely distinct from those deemed to have developed from single phonemes.

	*r̥	*l̥	*m̥	*n̥
Greek	ra, ar	la, al	a	a
Latin	or	ul	em	en
Sanskrit	r̥	r̥	a	a

The phonology of the sonorant examples in the previous table can only be explained by the presence of adjacent phonemes in PIE. Assuming the phonemes to be a following *h₁, *h₂, or *h₃ allows the same rules of vowel coloration and H-loss to apply to both PIE *e and PIE sonorants.

==== Support from Greek ablaut ====
The hypothetical values for sounds with laryngeals after H coloration and H loss (such as seen above in the triple reflex) draw much of their support for the regularization they allow in ablaut patterns, specifically the uncontested patterns found in Greek.

===== Ablaut in the root =====
In the following table, each row shows undisputed Greek cognates sharing the three ablaut grades of a root. The four sonorants and the two semivowels are represented as individual letters, other consonants as C and the vowel or its absence as (V).

	e grade	o grade	zero grade	root meaning
C(V)C	πέτεσθαι pétesthai	ποτή potḗ	πτέσθαι ptésthai	'fly'
C(V)iC	λείπειν leípein	λέλοιπα léloipa	λιπεῖν lipeîn	'leave'
C(V)uC	φεύγειν pheúgein		φυγεῖν phugeîn	'flee'
C(V)r	δέρκομαι dérkomai	δέδορκα dédorka	δρακεῖν drakeîn	'see clearly'
C(V)l	πέλομαι pélomai	πόλος pólos	πλέσθαι plésthai	'become'
C(V)m	τέμω témō	τόμος tómos	ταμεῖν tameîn	'cut'
C(V)n	γένος génos	γόνος gónos	γίγνομαι gígnomai	'birth'

The reconstructed PIE e grade and zero grade of the above roots may be arranged as follows:

	e grade	zero grade
C(V)C	*pet	*pt
C(V)iC	*leikʷ	*likʷ
C(V)uC	*bʰeug	*bʰug
C(V)r	*derk	*drk
C(V)l	*kʷel	*kʷl
C(V)m	*tem	*tm
C(V)n	*gen	*gn

An extension of the table to PIE roots ending in presumed laryngeals allows many Greek cognates to follow a regular ablaut pattern.

	e grade (I)	zero grade (II)	root meaning	cognates
C(V)h₁	*dʰeh₁	*dʰh₁	'put'	I : ē : τίθημι (títhēmi); II : e : θετός (thetós)
C(V)h₂	*steh₂	*sth₂	'stand'	I : ā : Doric ἳστᾱμι (hístāmi); II : a : στατός (statós)
C(V)h₃	*deh₃	*dh₃	'give'	I : ō : δίδωμι (dídōmi); II : o : δοτός (dotós)

===== Ablaut in the suffix =====
The first row of the following table shows how uncontested cognates relate to reconstructed PIE stems with e-grade or zero-grade roots, followed by e grade or zero grade of the suffix *–w-. The remaining rows show how the ablaut pattern of other cognates is preserved if the stems are presumed to include the suffixes *h₁, *h₂, and *h₃.

e-grade root zero-grade suffix I	zero-grade root e-grade suffix II	zero-grade root zero-grade suffix III	root meaning	cognates
*gen+w-	*gn+ew-	*gn+w-	'knee'	I Hittite genu II Gothic kniu III γνύξ (gnuks)
*gen+h₁-	*gn+eh₁	*gn+h₁-	'become'	I γενετήρ (genetḗr); II γνήσιος gnḗsios); III γίγνομαι (gígnomai)
*tel+h₂-	*tl+eh₂-	*tl+h₂-	'lift, bear'	I τελαμών (telamṓn); II ἔτλᾱν (étlān); III τάλας (tálas)
*ter+h₃-	*tr+eh₃-	*tr+h₃-	'bore, wound'	II τιτρώσκω (titrṓskō); III ἔτορον (étoron)

==== Intervocalic H loss ====
In the preceding sections, forms in the daughter languages were explained as reflexes of laryngeals in PIE stems. Since these stems are judged to have contained only one vowel, the explanations involved H loss either when a vowel preceded or when a vowel followed. However, the possibility of H loss between two vowels is present when a stem combines with an inflexional suffix.

It has been proposed that PIE H loss resulted in hiatus, which in turn was contracted to a vowel sound distinct from other long vowels by being disyllabic or of extra length.

===== Early Indo-Iranian disyllables =====
A number of long vowels in Avestan were pronounced as two syllables, and some examples also exist in early Sanskrit, particularly in the Rigveda. These can be explained as reflexes of contraction following a hiatus caused by the loss of intervocalic H in PIE.

===== Proto-Germanic trimoraic o =====
The reconstructed phonology of Proto-Germanic (PG), the ancestor of the Germanic languages, includes a long *ō phoneme, which is in turn the reflex of PIE *ā. As outlined above, laryngeal theory has identified instances of PIE *ā as reflexes of earlier *h₂e, *eh₂ or *aH before a consonant.

However, a distinct long PG *ō phoneme has been recognized with a different set of reflexes in daughter languages. The vowel length has been calculated by observing the effect of the shortening of final vowels in Gothic.

length	PG	Gothic
one mora	*a, *i, *u	∅, ∅, u
two morae	*ē, *ī, *ō, *ū	a, i?, a, u?
three morae	*ê, *ô	ē, ō

Reflexes of trimoraic or overlong *ô are found in the final syllable of nouns or verbs, and are thus associated with inflectional endings. Thus four PG sounds are proposed, shown here with Gothic and Old English reflexes:

	PG	Reflexes		PG	Reflexes
bimoraic	oral *ō	Gothic -a OE -u/-∅	trimoraic	oral *ô	Gothic -ō Old English -a
	nasal *ō̜	Gothic -a OE -æ/-e		nasal *ǫ̂	Gothic -ō Old English -a

A different contrast is observed in endings with final *z:

	PG	Reflexes		PG	Reflexes
bimoraic	*ōz	Gothic -ōs Old English -æ/-e	trimoraic	*ôz	Gothic -ōs Old English -a

Laryngeal theory preserves regularities in declensions and conjugations by explaining the trimoraic sound as a reflex of H loss between vowels followed by contraction. Thus

- by H loss *oHo > *oo > *ô;
- by H coloration and H loss *eh₂e > *ae > *â > *ô.

Trimoraic
ending	PIE	Reflex	PG	Reflexes
all stems genitive plural	*-oHom	Sanskrit -ām [often disyllabic in Rig Veda] Greek -ῶν (ô̜:n)	*-ǫ̂	Gothic -ō Old English -a
eh₂-stems nominative plural	*-eh₂es	Sanskrit –ās Lithuanian –ōs	*-ôz	Gothic -ōs Old English -a

Bimoraic
ending	PIE	Reflex	PG	Reflexes
thematic verbs present indicative 1st person singular	*-oh₂	Latin -ō Lithuanian -u	*-ō	Gothic -a Old English -u (Anglian)
eh₂-stems nominative singular	*-eh₂	Sanskrit -ā Lithuanian -à	*-ō	Gothic -a Old English -u
eh₂-stems accusative singular	*-eh₂m	Sanskrit -ām Latin -am	*-ō̜	Gothic -a Old English -e
eh₂-stems accusative plural	*-eh₂ns	Sanskrit -ās Latin *-ans > -ās	*-ōz	Gothic -ōs Old English -e

(Trimoraic *ô is also reconstructed as word final in contexts that are not explained by laryngeal theory.)

===== Balto-Slavic long vowel accent =====
The reconstructed phonology of the Balto-Slavic languages posits two distinct long vowels in almost exact correspondence to bimoraic and trimoraic vowels in Proto-Germanic. The Balto-Slavic vowels are distinguished not by length but by intonation; long vowels with circumflex accent correspond to Proto-Germanic trimoraic vowels. A significant proportion of long vowels with an acute accent (also described as with acute register) correspond to Proto-Germanic bimoraic vowels. These correspondences have led to the suggestion that the split between them occurred in the last common ancestor of the two daughters.

It has been suggested that acute intonation was associated with glottalization, a suggestion supported by glottalized reflexes in Latvian. This could lend support to a theory that laryngeal consonants developed into glottal stops before their disappearance in Balto-Slavic and Proto-Germanic.

==== H loss adjacent to other sounds ====
===== After stop consonants =====
A significant number of instances of voiceless aspirates in the Indo-Iranian languages may be explained as reflexes of PIE stop consonants immediately followed by laryngeals (*CH > *Cʰ).

===== After resonants =====
PIE resonants (sonorants) *r̥, *l̥, *m̥, *n̥ are predicted to become consonantal allophones *r, *l, *m, *n when immediately followed by a vowel. Using R to symbolize any resonant (sonorant) and V for any vowel, *R̥V>*RV. Instances in the daughter languages of a vocalic resonant immediately followed by a vowel (RV) can sometimes be explained as reflexes of PIE *R̥HV with a laryngeal between the resonant and the vowel giving rise to a vocalic allophone. This original vocalic quality was preserved following H loss.

===== Next to semivowels =====
Laryngeal theory has been used to explain the occurrence of a reconstructed sound change known as Holtzmann's law, sometimes called "sharpening" (from German Verschärfung) in North Germanic and East Germanic languages. The existing theory explains that PIE semivowels *y and *w were doubled to Proto-Germanic *-yy- and *-ww-, and that these in turn became -ddj- and -ggw- respectively in Gothic and -ggj- and -ggw- in early North Germanic languages. However, the existing theory had difficulty in predicting which instances of PIE semivowels led to sharpening and which instances failed to do so. The new explanation proposes that words exhibiting sharpening are derived from PIE words with laryngeals.

Example
PIE	early Proto-Germanic		later Proto-Germanic	Reflexes
*drewh₂yo 'trustworthy'	*trewwjaz	with sharpening	*triwwjaz	Gothic triggws Old Norse tryggr
*drewh₂yo 'trustworthy'	*trewwjaz	without sharpening	*triuwjaz	Old English trēowe Old High German gitriuwi

Many of these techniques rely on the laryngeal being preceded by a vowel, and so they are not readily applicable for word-initial laryngeals except in Greek and Armenian. However, occasionally languages have compounds in which a medial vowel is unexpectedly lengthened or otherwise shows the effect of the following laryngeal. This shows that the second word originally began with a laryngeal and that this laryngeal still existed at the time the compound was formed.

== Support for theory from external borrowings ==
Further evidence of the laryngeals has been found in Uralic languages, and some marginal cases also in Kartvelian. While the protolanguages of these families have not been convincingly demonstrated to be genetically related to PIE, some word correspondences have been identified as likely borrowings from very early Indo-European dialects to early Uralic and Kartvelian dialects. In a few such instances, laryngeal consonants reconstructed in PIE stems show correspondences with overt dorsal or laryngeal consonants in the Proto-Uralic and Proto-Kartvelian forms, in effect suggesting that these forms result from very old PIE borrowings where the consonantal nature of the PIE laryngeals was preserved.

=== Laryngeals reflected in the Kartvelian languages ===
The evidence for the preservation of laryngeals by borrowings into Proto-Kartvelian is meagre, but intriguing.

It has been suggested that some examples of an initial Proto-Kartvelian sequence *γw- may reflect sequences of the form *Hw- borrowed from PIE — cp. e.g. PK *γweb- 'to weave' alongside PIE *h₁webʰ- 'id.', PK *γwel- 'to turn, to twist' alongside PIE *(h₁)wel- 'to turn, to roll' — although evidence for *Hw- sequences in most of the proposed PIE source terms is controversial and other possible explanations for Proto-Kartvelian *γw- sequences exist.

A separate suggestion proposes that the PIE *a-colouring laryngeal *h₂ is reflected as Proto-Kartvelian *x in two fruit names borrowed from PIE *(s)méh₂lo- 'apple', namely Proto-Kartvelian *msxal- 'pear' and *sxmart'l̥- 'medlar', the latter etymologically the 'rotten (*t'l̥-) pear'.

=== Laryngeals reflected in the Uralic languages ===
Evidence for the PIE laryngeals has been suggested in ancient loans into Proto-Uralic. Work particularly associated with research of the scholar Jorma Koivulehto has identified several additions to the list of Finnic loanwords from an Indo-European source or sources whose particular interest is the apparent correlation of PIE laryngeals with three postalveolar phonemes (or their later reflexes) in the Finnic forms. If so, this would suggest great antiquity for the borrowings; since no attested Indo-European language neighbouring Uralic has consonants as reflexes of laryngeals, this would bolster the idea that laryngeals were phonetically distinct consonants.

However, Koivulehto's theories are not universally accepted and have been sharply criticized (e.g. by Finno-Ugricist Eugene Helimski) because many of the reconstructions involve a great deal of far-fetched hypotheses and the chronology is not in good agreement with the history of Bronze Age and Iron Age migrations in the Eastern Europe established by archaeologists and historians.

Three Uralic phonemes have been posited to reflect PIE laryngeals. In post-vocalic positions both the postalveolar fricatives that ever existed in Uralic are represented: firstly a possibly velar one, theoretically reconstructed much as the PIE laryngeals (conventionally marked *x), in the very oldest borrowings and secondly a grooved one (*š as in shoe becoming modern Finnic h) in some younger ones. The velar plosive k is the third reflex and the only one found word-initially. In intervocalic position, the reflex k is probably younger than either of the two former ones. The fact that Finno-Ugric may have plosive reflexes for PIE laryngeals is to be expected under well documented Finnic phonological behaviour and does not mean much for tracing the phonetic value of PIE laryngeals.

The correspondences do not differentiate between *h₁, *h₂, and *h₃. Thus

1. PIE laryngeals correspond to the PU laryngeal *x in wordstems like:
  - Finnish na-inen 'woman' / naa-ras 'female' < PU *näxi-/*naxi- < PIE [*gʷnah₂-] = /*gʷneh₂-/ > Sanskrit gnā́ 'goddess', OIr. mná (gen. of ben), ~ Greek gunē 'woman' (cognate to Engl. queen)
  - Finnish sou-ta- ~ Samic *sukë- 'to row' < PU *suxi- < PIE *sewh-
  - Finnish tuo- 'bring' ~ Samic *tuokë- ~ Tundra Nenets tāś 'give' < PU *toxi- < PIE [*doh₃-] = /*deh₃-/ > Greek didōmi, Lat. dō-, Old Lith. dúomi 'give', Hittite dā 'take'
  Note the consonantal reflex /k/ in Samic.
2. PIE laryngeals correspond to Finnic *h, whose normal origin is a Pre-Finnic fricative *š in wordstems like:
  - Finnish rohto ([roçto~roxto]) 'medical plant, green herb' < PreFi *rošto < PreG *groH-tu- > Gmc. *grōþu 'green growth' > Swedish grodd 'germ (shoot)'
  - Old Finnish inhi-(m-inen) 'human being' < PreFi *inši- 'descendant' < PIE *ǵnh₁-(i)e/o- > Sanskrit jā́- 'born, offspring, descendant', Gmc. *kunja- 'generation, lineage, kin'
3. PIE laryngeals correspond to Pre-Finnic *k in wordstems like:
  - Finnish kesä 'summer' < PFS *kesä < PIE *h₁es-en- (*h₁os-en-/-er-) > Balto-Slavic *eseni- 'autumn', Gothic asans 'summer'
  - Finnish kaski 'burnt-over clearing' < Proto-Finnic *kaski < PIE/PreG [*h₂a(h₁)zg-] = /*h₂e(h₁)sg-/ > Gmc. *askōn 'ashes'
  - Finnish koke- 'to perceive, sense' < PreFi *koki- < PIE [*h₃okw-ie/o] = /*h₃ekw-ie/o/ > Greek opsomai 'look, observe' (cognate to Lat. oculus 'eye')
  - Finnish kulke- 'to go, walk, wander' ~ Hungarian halad- 'to go, walk, proceed' < PFU *kulki- < PIE *kʷelH-e/o- > Greek pelomai '(originally) to be moving', Sanskrit cárati 'goes, walks, wanders (about)', cognate Lat. colere 'to till, cultivate, inhabit'
  - Finnish teke- 'do, make' ~ Hungarian të-v-, tesz- 'to do, make, put, place' < PFU *teki- < PIE *dʰeh₁ > Greek títhēmi, Sanskrit dádhāti 'put, place', but 'do, make' in the western IE languages, e.g. the Germanic forms do, German tun, etc., and Latin faciō (though OE dón and into Early Modern English do still sometimes means "put", and doen or tun still does in Dutch and colloquial German).

This list is not exhaustive, especially when one also considers several etymologies with laryngeal reflexes in Finno-Ugric languages other than Finnish. For most cases no other plausible etymology exists. While some single etymologies may be challenged, the case for this oldest stratum itself seems conclusive from the Uralic point of view, and corresponds well with all that is known about the dating of the other most ancient borrowings and contacts with Indo-European populations. Yet acceptance for this evidence is far from unanimous among Indo-European linguists, some even regard the hypothesis as controversial (see above). If, on the other hand, the Indo-Uralic hypothesis is supported, the explanation of why the correspondences do not differentiate between *h₁, *h₂, and *h₃ is that Pre-PIE or Indo-Hittite innovated this difference as a part of developing ablaut, where the zero grade matched *h₁ ([ʔ] and [h]), the front-unrounded full ("e") grade matched *h₂ (mainstream [χ] > [ħ] and [x] < [çʶ]) and the back-rounded full ("o") grade matched *h₃ (Kümmel's uvular > pharyngeal fricative and [ɣʷ]).

=== PIE laryngeals and Proto-Semitic ===
Several linguists have posited a relationship between PIE and Semitic, almost right after the discovery of Hittite. Among these were Hermann Möller, though a few had argued that such a relationship existed before the 20th century, like Richard Lepsius in 1836. The postulated correspondences between the IE laryngeals and that of Semitic assist in demonstrating their evident existence. Given here are a few lexical comparisons between the two respective proto-languages based on Václav Blažek, who discusses these correspondences in the context of a proposed relation between IE and Afroasiatic, the language family to which the Semitic languages belong:

1. Semitic *ʼ-b-y 'to want, desire' ~ PIE [*hyebʰ-] 'to have sex'
2. Semitic *ʼ-m-m/y ~ PIE [*h₁em-] 'to take'
3. Semitic *ʼin-a 'in', 'on', 'by' ~ PIE [*h₁en-] > Sanskrit ni, ~ Greek enōpḗ
4. Semitic *ʼanāku ~ PIE *h₁eǵ(hom)- 'I'
5. Semitic *ʻ-d-w 'to pass (over), move, run' ~ PIE [*weh₂dʰ-] 'to pass through'
6. Semitic *ʻ-l-y 'to rise, grow, go up, be high' ~ PIE [*h₂el-] 'to grow, nourish'
7. Semitic *ʻ-k-w: Arabic ʻakā 'to rise, be big' ~ PIE [*h₂ewg-] 'to grow, nourish'
8. Semitic *ʻl 'next, in addition' ~ PIE [*h₂el-] 'in'
9. Semitic: Arabic ʻanan 'side', ʻan 'from, for; upon; in' ~ PIE [*h₂en h₂e/u-] 'on'

== Comments ==
The Greek forms ánemos and árotron are particularly valuable because the verb roots in question are extinct in Greek as verbs. This means that there is no possibility of some sort of analogical interference, as, for example, happened in the case of Latin arātrum 'plow' (noun), whose shape has been distorted by the verb arāre 'to plow' (the exact cognate to the Greek form would have been *aretrum). It used to be standard to explain the root vowels of Greek thetós, statós, dotós 'put, stood, given' as analogical. Most scholars nowadays probably take them as original, but in the case of 'wind' and 'plow', the argument cannot even come up.

Regarding Greek híeros, the pseudo-participle affix *-ro- is added directly to the verb root, so *ish₁-ro- > *isero- > *ihero- > híeros (with regular throwback of the aspiration to the beginning of the word), and Sanskrit iṣirá-. There seems to be no question of the existence of a root *eysH- "vigorously move/cause to move". If the word began with a laryngeal, and most scholars would agree that it did, it would have to be *h₁-, specifically; and that is a problem. A root of the shape *h₁eysh₁- is not possible. Indo-European had no roots of the type *mem-, *tet-, *dhredh-, i.e., with two copies of the same consonant. But Greek attests an earlier (and rather more widely attested) form of the same meaning, híaros. If we reconstruct *h₁eysh₂-, all of our problems are solved in one stroke. The explanation for the híeros/híaros business has long been discussed, without much result; laryngeal theory now provides the opportunity for an explanation which did not exist before, namely the metathesis of the two laryngeals. It is still only a guess, but it is a much simpler and more elegant guess than the guesses available before.

The syllabic *h₂ in *ph₂ter- "father" might not be isolated. Certain evidence shows that the kinship affix seen in "mother, father" etc. might have been *-h₂ter instead of *-ter. The laryngeal syllabified after a consonant (thus Greek patḗr, Latin pater, Sanskrit pitár-; Greek thugátēr, Sanskrit duhitár- "daughter") but lengthened a preceding vowel (thus say Latin māter "mother", frāter "brother") — even when the "vowel" in question was a syllabic resonant, as in Sanskrit yātaras "husbands' wives" < *yṆt- < *yṇ-h₂ter-).

== Laryngeals in morphology ==
Like any other consonant, laryngeals feature in the endings of verbs and nouns and derivational morphology, the only difference being the greater difficulty of telling what's going on. Indo-Iranian, for example, can retain forms that pretty clearly reflect a laryngeal, but there is no way of knowing which one.

The following is a rundown of laryngeals in Proto-Indo-European morphology.

- *h₁ is seen in the instrumental ending (probably originally indifferent to number, like English expressions of the type by hand and on foot). In Sanskrit, feminine i- and u-stems have instrumentals in -ī, -ū, respectively. In the Rigveda, there are a few old a-stems (PIE *o-stems) with an instrumental in -ā; but even in that oldest text the usual ending is -enā, from the n-stems.

Greek has some adverbs in -ē, but more important are the Mycenaean forms like e-re-pa-te "with ivory" (i.e. elephantē? -ě?)

The marker of the neuter dual was *-iH, as in Sanskrit bharatī "two carrying ones (neut.)", nāmanī "two names", yuge "two yokes" (< yuga-i? *yuga-ī?). Greek to the rescue: the Homeric form ósse "the (two) eyes" is manifestly from *h₃ekʷ-ih₁ (formerly *okʷ-ī) via fully regular sound laws (intermediately *okʷye).

*-eh₁- derives stative verb senses from eventive roots: PIE *sed- "sit (down)": *sed-eh₁- "be in a sitting position" (> Proto-Italic *sed-ē-ye-mos "we are sitting" > Latin sedēmus). It is attested in Celtic, Italic, Germanic (the Class IV weak verbs), and Balto-Slavic, with some traces in Indo-Iranian (In Avestan the affix seems to form past-habitual stems).

It seems likely, though it is less certain, that this same *-h₁ underlies the nominative-accusative dual in o-stems: Sanskrit vṛkā, Greek lúkō "two wolves". (The alternative ending -āu in Sanskrit cuts a small figure in the Rigveda, but eventually becomes the standard form of the o-stem dual.)

*-h₁s- derives desiderative stems as in Sanskrit jighāṃsati "desires to slay" < *gʷhi-gʷhṇ-h₁s-e-ti- (root *gʷhen-, Sanskrit han- "slay"). This is the source of Greek future tense formations and (with the addition of a thematic suffix *-ye/o-) the Indo-Iranian one as well: bhariṣyati "will carry" < *bher-h₁s-ye-ti.

*-yeh₁-/*-ih₁- is the optative suffix for root verb inflections, e.g. Latin (old) siet "may he be", sīmus "may we be", Sanskrit syāt "may he be", and so on.

- *h₂ is seen as the marker of the neuter plural: *-h₂ in the consonant stems, *-eh₂ in the vowel stems. Much levelling and remodelling are seen in the daughter languages that preserve any ending at all, thus Latin has generalized *-ā throughout the noun system (later regularly shortened to -a), Greek generalized -ǎ < *-h₂.

The categories masculine/feminine plainly did not exist in the most original form of Proto-Indo-European, and there are very few noun types which are formally different in the two genders. The formal differences are mostly to be seen in adjectives (and not all of them) and pronouns. Both types of derived feminine stems feature *h₂: a type that is patently derived from the o-stem nominals; and an ablauting type showing alternations between *-yeh₂- and *-ih₂-. Both are peculiar in having no actual marker for the nominative singular, and at least as far as the *-eh₂- type, two features seem clear: it is based on the o-stems, and the nom.sg. is probably in origin a neuter plural. (An archaic trait of Indo-European morpho-syntax is that plural neuter nouns construe with singular verbs, and quite possibly *yugeh₂ was not so much "yokes" in our sense, but "yokage; a harnessing-up".) Once that much is thought of, however, it is not easy to pin down the details of the "ā-stems" in the Indo-European languages outside of Anatolia, and such an analysis sheds no light at all on the *-yeh₂-/*-ih₂- stems, which (like the *eh₂-stems) form feminine adjective stems and derived nouns (e.g. Sanskrit devī- "goddess" from deva- "god") but unlike the "ā-stems" have no foundation in any neuter category.

*-eh₂- seems to have formed factitive verbs, as in *new-eh₂- "to renew, make new again", as seen in Latin novāre, Greek neáō, and Hittite ne-wa-aḫ-ḫa-an-t- (participle) all "renew" but all three with the pregnant sense of "plow anew; return fallow land to cultivation".

*-h₂- marked the 1st person singular, with a confusing distribution: in the thematic active (the familiar -ō ending of Greek and Latin, and Indo-Iranian -ā(mi)), and also in the perfect tense (not really a tense in PIE): *-h₂e as in Greek oîda "I know" < *woyd-h₂e. It is the basis of the Hittite ending -ḫḫi, as in da-aḫ-ḫi "I take" < *-ḫa-i (original *-ḫa embellished with the primary tense marker with subsequent smoothing of the diphthong).

- *-eh₃ may be tentatively identified in a directive case. No such case is found in Indo-European noun paradigms, but such a construct accounts for a curious collection of Hittite forms like ne-pi-ša "(in)to the sky", ták-na-a "to, into the ground", a-ru-na "to the sea". These are sometimes explained as o-stem datives in -a < *-ōy, an ending attested in Greek and Indo-Iranian, among others, but there are serious problems with such a view, and the forms are highly coherent, functionally. And there are also appropriate adverbs in Greek and Latin (elements lost in productive paradigms sometimes survive in stray forms, like the old instrumental case of the definite article in English expressions like the more the merrier): Greek ánō "upwards, kátō "downwards", Latin quō "whither?", eō "to that place"; and perhaps even the Indic preposition/preverb â "to(ward)" which has no satisfactory competing etymology. (These forms must be distinguished from the similar-looking ones formed to the ablative in *-ōd and with a distinctive "fromness" sense: Greek ópō "whence, from where".)

== Criticism ==
Throughout its history, the laryngeal theory in its various forms has been subject to extensive criticism and revision.

The original argument of Saussure was not accepted by anyone in the Neogrammarian school, primarily based at the University of Leipzig, then reigning at the cutting edge of Indo-European linguistics. Several of the Neogrammarians attacked the Mémoire savagely. Hermann Osthoff's criticism was particularly virulent, often descending into personal invective.

For the first half-century of its existence, the laryngeal theory was widely seen as "an eccentric fancy of outsiders". In Germany, it was roundly rejected. Among its early proponents were Hermann Möller, who extended Saussure's system with a third, non-colouring laryngeal, Albert Cuny, Holger Pedersen, and Karel Oštir. The fact that these scholars were engaged in highly speculative long-range linguistic comparison further contributed to the theory's isolation.

Although the founding theorists were able to provide some indirect evidence of a lost consonantal element (for example, the origin of the Indo-Iranian voiceless aspirates in *CH sequences and the ablaut pattern of the heavy bases, *CeRə- ~ *CR̥̄- in the traditional formulation), the direct evidence so crucial for the Neogrammarian thinking was lacking. Saussure's structural considerations were foreign to the leading contemporary linguists.

After Jerzy Kuryłowicz's convincing demonstration that the Hittite language preserved at least some of Saussure's coefficients sonantiques, the focus of the debate shifted. It was still unclear how many laryngeals are to be posited to account for the new facts and what effect they have had exactly. Kuryłowicz, after a while, settled on four laryngeals, an approach further accepted by Edward Sapir, Edgar Sturtevant, and – through them – much of American linguistics. The three-laryngeal system was defended by, among others, Walter Couvreur and Émile Benveniste. Many individual proposals were made, which assumed up to ten laryngeals, such as that of André Martinet. While some scholars, like Heinz Kronasser and Giuliano Bonfante, attempted to disregard Anatolian evidence altogether, the "minimal" serious proposal (with roots in Pedersen's early ideas) was put forward by Hans Hendriksen, Louis Hammerich, and later Ladislav Zgusta, who assumed a single /H/ phoneme with no vowel-colouring effects.

However, by the 2000s a widespread agreement was reached in the field – though not unanimous – on reconstructing Möller's three laryngeals. One of the last major critics of this approach was Oswald Szemerényi, who subscribed to a theory similar to Zgusta's.

Today, the laryngeal theory is almost universally accepted in this new standard form. Nevertheless, marginal attempts to undermine its bases are occasionally undertaken.
