= Albert Cuny =

French linguist

Albert Cuny (16 May 1869 – 21 March 1947) was a French linguist known for his attempts to establish phonological correspondences between the Indo-European and Semitic languages and for his contributions to the laryngeal theory.

He was a student of the French Indo-Europeanist Antoine Meillet (Faral 1947:277). From 1910 until his formal retirement from teaching in 1937 he was a professor of Latin and comparative grammar at the University of Bordeaux (ib. 278). He continued teaching Sanskrit at the University however for the rest of his life (ib.). He was a correspondent of the Académie des inscriptions et belles-lettres (ib. 277).

Cuny's place in the development of the laryngeal theory is described as follows by Émile Benveniste (1935:148):

The necessary precondition for any Indo-European reconstruction was provided by the brilliant discovery of F. de Saussure relative to the consonantal nature of the phoneme ə. Accepted and enriched by Möller, by Pedersen and Cuny, this theory can pass for established today thanks to the perspicacity of J. Kuryłowicz, who was able to recognize two of the three varieties of Indo-European ə in Hittite ḫ.

== See also ==
- Hermann Möller
- Indo-Semitic languages
- Laryngeal theory

== Bibliography ==
=== Selected works by Albert Cuny ===
- 1914. "Notes de phonétique historique. Indo-européen et sémitique." Revue de phonétique 2:101–132.
- 1924. Etudes prégrammaticales sur le domaine des langues indo-européennes et chamito-sémitiques. Paris: Champion.
- 1924, co-authored with Michel Féghali. Du genre grammatical en sémitique. Paris: Geuthner.
- 1943. Recherches sur le vocalisme, le consonantisme et la formation des racines en « nostratique », ancêtre de l'indo-européen et du chamito-sémitique. Paris: Adrien Maisonneuve.
- 1946. Invitation à l'étude comparative des langues indo-européennes et des langues chamito-sémitiques. Bordeaux: Brière.

=== Other works cited ===
- Benveniste, Émile. 1935. Origines de la formations des noms en indo-européen. Paris: Adrien Maisonneuve.
- Faral, Edmond. 1947. "Éloge funèbre de M. Albert Cuny." Comptes rendus des séances de l'Académie des Inscriptions et Belles-Lettres 91.2, 277-279.
