= Bert Eriksson =

Belgian neo-Nazi

Armand Albert (Bert) Eriksson (30 June 1931 – 2 October 2005) was a leading Flemish nationalist.

== Biography ==
Born in Antwerp. His father was a sailor from Finland his mother was Flemish. Eriksson became a Nazi at an early age and joined the Hitler Youth before the end of the Second World War. A staunch anti-communist, he went in 1950 to fight in the Korean War as a paratrooper.

In 1968 he opened a café, 'Lokaal Odal', in Antwerp which became a leading centre for neo-Nazis after the War. He took command of the Vlaamse Militanten Orde (VMO) in 1971 after it had been disbanded by founder Bob Maes and turned it towards a more extreme right path. After the VMO was outlawed in 1984 he started the Odal Group, which presented itself as the successor to the VMO. As VMO leader Eriksson had been brought to trial in 1981 on charges of leading a private army but, although initially found guilty, he was acquitted by the Antwerp court of appeal in June 1982. The VMO itself continued in defiance of the ban although Eriksson's leadership came to an end in 1985 when Jef Eggermont took over. Eriksson had come to attention in 1973 by going to Austria and digging up the remains of Belgian collaborator Cyriel Verschaeve, which he then reburied in Alveringem. He later claimed to have done the same with the remains of Staf De Clercq and Anton Mussert.

He also went on to be associated with the Wehrwolf-Verbond, an anti-Semitic group based in Antwerp, and addressed their rally in 1996.

He died 2 October 2005 in Westdorpe, Netherlands from lung disease, aged 73.
