= National Rally (disambiguation) =

National Rally (French: Rassemblement National) is a far-right political party in France.

National Rally may also refer to:

- National Rally (Belgium), a former political party in Belgium
- Rassemblement National Français ('French National Rally'), a former political party in France

== See also ==
- National Popular Rally, a former political party in Vichy France
- Ralliement national, a political party in Quebec, Canada
