= Hermann Möller =

Danish linguist (1850–1923)

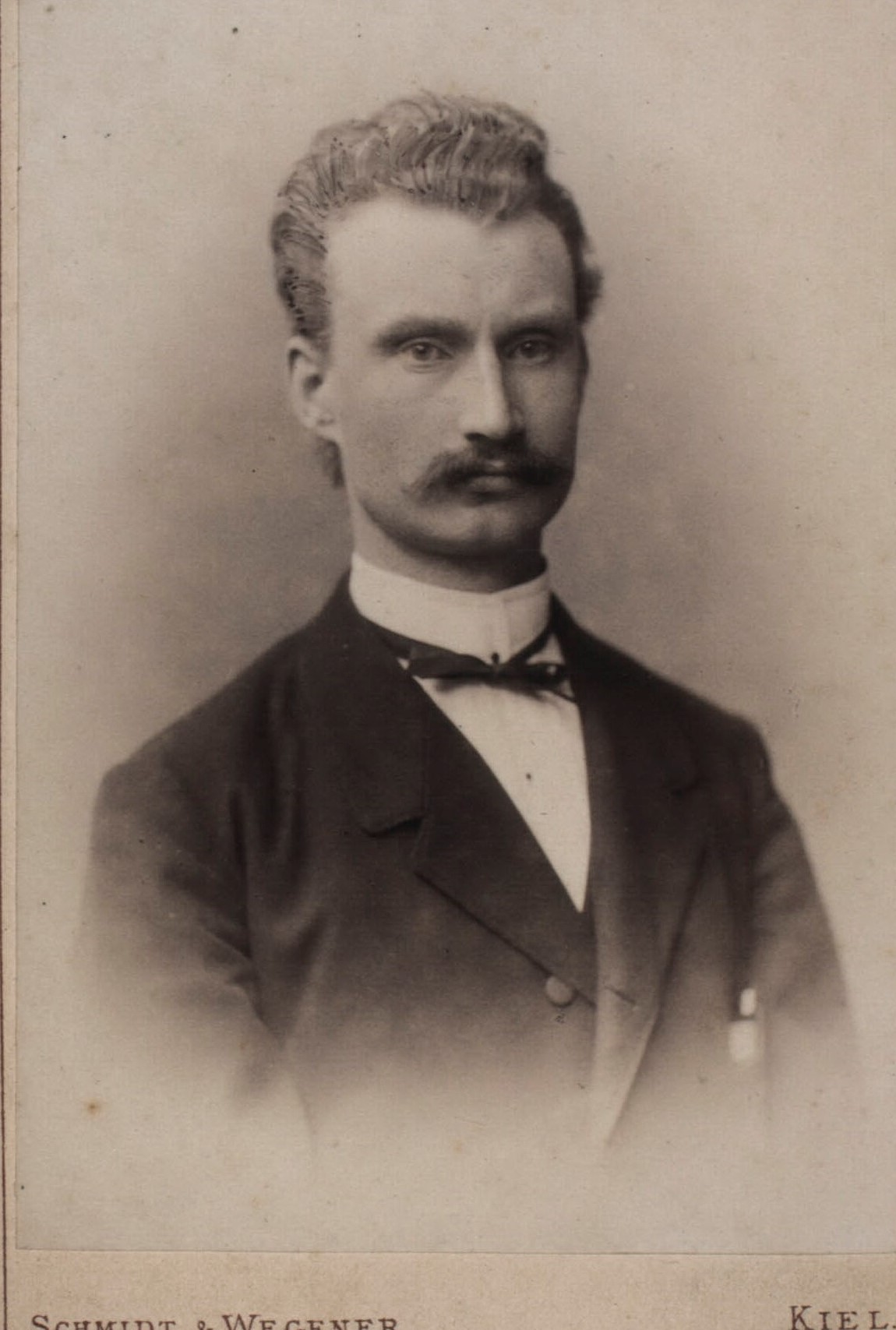
Hermann Möller

Hermann Möller (13 January 1850, in Hjerpsted, Denmark – 5 October 1923, in Copenhagen) was a Danish linguist noted for his work in favor of a genetic relationship between the Indo-European and Semitic language families and his version of the laryngeal theory.

Möller grew up in North Frisia after its conquest by Germany in the German–Danish War of 1864 and attended German universities (Pulsiano and Treharne 2001:447). He began teaching Germanic philology at the University of Copenhagen in 1883 and continued to do so for over thirty-five years (ib.). Also in 1883, he published Das altenglische Volksepos in der ursprünglichen strophischen Form, 'The Old English Folk Epic in the Original Strophic Form', in which he argued, among other things, that Beowulf had been composed in a fixed meter which was corrupted by later poets (ib.).

== Indo-European and Semitic ==
Möller's magnum opus was the Vergleichendes indogermanisch-semitisches Wörterbuch, 'Dictionary of Comparative Indo-European–Semitic', published in 1911.

Although Möller's association of Semitic and Indo-European reflected a high level of linguistic expertise and was the fruit of many years of labor, it did not receive general acceptance from the linguistic community and is rarely mentioned today.

It was, however, accepted as valid by a number of leading linguists of the time, such as Holger Pedersen (1924) and Louis Hjelmslev. According to Hjelmslev (1970:79), "a genetic relationship between Indo-European and Hamito-Semitic was demonstrated in detail by the Danish linguist Hermann Möller, using the method of element functions".

Möller's work was continued by Albert Cuny (1924, 1943, 1946) in France and more recently by the American scholar Saul Levin (1971, 1995, 2002).

It was doubtless thanks to Möller's work that Holger Pedersen included Hamito-Semitic in his proposed Nostratic language family, a classification maintained by subsequent Nostraticists (e.g. Vladislav Illich-Svitych and Aharon Dolgopolsky). The Hamitic family was shown to be invalid by Joseph Greenberg (1950), who consequently rejected the name Hamito-Semitic, replacing it with Afroasiatic, under which Semitic is classed today, along with some but not all of the languages formerly classed as Hamitic.

The American Nostraticist Allan Bomhard began his career with work in the tradition of Möller and Cuny, initially comparing Indo-European and Semitic (1975). He subsequently broadened the base to include Afroasiatic in general, an approach found in his first major work, Toward Proto-Nostratic: A New Approach to the Comparison of Proto-Indo-European and Proto-Afroasiatic (1984). He later expanded his comparisons to include other language families, such as Uralic and Kartvelian (cf. Bomhard 2008:6).

In carrying out his Indo-European–Semitic comparison, Möller produced a reconstruction of Proto-Semitic of hitherto unparalleled sophistication. According to Edgar Sturtevant (1908:50):

The theory that Indo-European and Semitic sprang from a common origin has often been suggested and rejected. The first scholar equipped with exact knowledge of both fields to undertake its defence is H. Möller in his book Semitisch und Indogermanisch, I Konsonanten (Kopenhagen and Leipzig, 1906). His argument rests necessarily upon a series of phonetic laws which describe the variations of the two main branches from the assumed parent language. On the Indo-European side Möller starts with the hypothetical forms that all Indo-European scholars use (though with varying views as to their value). For the other term of the comparison, however, he has to construct for himself a prehistoric Semitic. Some reviewers see in this preliminary task the chief value of the book.

== The laryngeal theory ==
Möller is also well known for his contributions to the laryngeal theory.

In 1878, Ferdinand de Saussure, then a 21-year-old student at the University of Leipzig, published his Mémoire sur le système primitif des voyelles dans les langues indo-européennes, 'Dissertation on the original system of vowels in the Indo-European languages', the work that founded the laryngeal theory. According to Saussure, Indo-European had had two "sonantic coefficients", vanished sounds that had two properties: they lengthened a preceding vowel; one of them gave the vowel e or a timbre, while the other gave the vowel o timbre.

Saussure's argument was not accepted by any of the Neogrammarians, the school, primarily based at the University of Leipzig, then reigning at the cutting-edge of Indo-European linguistics. Several of them attacked the Mémoire savagely. Osthoff's criticism was particularly virulent, often descending into personal invective (De Mauro in Saussure 1972:327-328). One of the few scholars to come to Saussure's defense was Möller, beginning in an article in 1880 – a defense which earned him Osthoff's scorn as well (ib. 328).

Möller offered several refinements over Saussure's original version of the theory:

- He argued that a third coefficient was needed: one that produced o timbre, another e timbre, a third a timbre (1880). This view was adopted by most scholars who subsequently endorsed the laryngeal theory.
- He argued that the coefficients changed not only a preceding but also a following vowel to these timbres. This argument has also been widely accepted.
- In 1917, Möller published a major work on the theory, Die semitisch-vorindogermanischen laryngalen Konsonanten, 'The Semitic–Pre-Indo-European Laryngeal Consonants'. In this work, he argued that the vanished sounds were laryngeals, a type of sound also found in Semitic languages. He also argued that the presence of laryngeals in both Semitic and Indo-European constituted a proof of these families' relationship. As a result of Möller's thesis, the theory originated by Saussure came to be known as "the laryngeal theory" and the vanished sounds it posits as "the laryngeals". Today, relatively few scholars believe these sounds were actually laryngeals (indeed there is no consensus on their phonetic value or even whether this is knowable), but the term remains in general use.

For the first half-century of its existence, the laryngeal theory was widely seen as "an eccentric fancy of outsiders". "In Germany it was totally rejected" (ib. 134). In 1927, the Polish linguist Jerzy Kuryłowicz announced that Hittite ḫ was found in two of the positions predicted for a "laryngeal" by the Saussure–Möller theory. The evidence was crushing, overwhelming. As a result, the laryngeal theory is generally accepted today in one form or another, although scholars who deal with the theory disagree on the number of laryngeals to be accepted, with most positing three (like Möller) or four, but some positing as few as one or as many as thirteen.

In Oswald Szemerényi's appreciation (1996:124), although "Saussure is the founder of modern views on the IE vowel system", "the true founder of the laryngeal theory is the Danish scholar Möller."

== Works cited ==
- Bomhard, Allan R. 1975. "An outline of the historical phonology of Indo-European." Orbis 24.2:354-390.
- Bomhard, Allan R. 1984. Toward Proto-Nostratic: A New Approach to the Comparison of Proto-Indo-European and Proto-Afroasiatic. Amsterdam: John Benjamins.
- Bomhard, Allan R. 2008. Reconstructing Proto-Nostratic: Comparative Phonology, Morphology, and Vocabulary, 2 volumes. Leiden: Brill.
- Cuny, Albert. 1924. Etudes prégrammaticales sur le domaine des langues indo-européennes et chamito-sémitiques. Paris: Champion.
- Cuny, Albert. 1943. Recherches sur le vocalisme, le consonantisme et la formation des racines en « nostratique », ancêtre de l'indo-européen et du chamito-sémitique. Paris: Adrien Maisonneuve.
- Cuny, Albert. 1946. Invitation à l'étude comparative des langues indo-européennes et des langues chamito-sémitiques. Bordeaux: Brière.
- Greenberg, Joseph H. 1950. "Studies in African linguistic classification: IV. Hamito-Semitic." Southwestern Journal of Anthropology 6:47-63.
- Hjelmslev, Louis. 1970. Language: An Introduction. Madison: University of Wisconsin Press.
- Kuryłowicz, Jerzy. 1927. “ə indo-européen et ḫ hittite”, in Symbolae grammaticae in honorem Ioannis Rozwadowski, vol. 1. Edited by W. Taszycki & W. Doroszewski. Kraków: Gebethner & Wolff, pp. 95–104.
- Levin, Saul. 1971. The Indo-European and Semitic Languages: An Exploration of Structural Similarities Related to Accent, Chiefly in Greek, Sanskrit, and Hebrew. State University of New York Press. ISBN 978-0-87395-055-8.
- Levin, Saul. 1995. Semitic and Indo-European, Volume 1: The Principal Etymologies, With Observations on Afro-Asiatic. John Benjamins. ISBN 1-55619-583-4.
- Levin, Saul. 2002. Semitic and Indo-European, Volume 2: Comparative Morphology, Syntax and Phonetics. John Benjamins. ISBN 1-58811-222-5.
- Martinet, André. 1986. Des steppes aux océans: l'indo-européen et les indo-européens. Paris: Payot.
- Möller, Hermann. 1880. "Zur Declination: germanisch ā, ē, ō in den Endungen des Nomens und die Entstehung des o (<a2). — Darin Exkurs: Die Entstehung des o. S. 492-534." Beiträge zur Geschichte der deutschen Sprache und Literatur 7:482–547, 611.
- Möller, Hermann. 1883. Das altenglische Volksepos in der ursprünglichen strophischen Form. Kiel: Lipsius & Tischer.
- Möller, Hermann. 1906. Semitisch und Indogermanisch. Teil l. Konsonanten. (Only volume to appear of a projected longer work.) Kopenhagen: H. Hagerup, 1906. (Reprint: 1978. Hildesheim – New York: Georg Olms. ISBN 3-487-06669-6.)
- Möller, Hermann. 1911. Vergleichendes indogermanisch-semitisches Wörterbuch. Kopenhagen. (Reprint: 1970, reissued 1997. Göttingen: Vandenhoeck and Ruprecht. ISBN 3-525-26115-2.)
- Möller, Hermann. 1917. Die semitisch-vorindogermanischen laryngalen Konsonanten. København: Andr. Fred. Høst.
- Pedersen, Holger. 1924. Sprogvidenskaben i det Nittende Aarhundrede. Metoder og Resultater. København: Gyldendalske Boghandel.
  - English translation: Pedersen, Holger. 1931. Linguistic Science in the Nineteenth Century: Methods and Results, translated from the Danish by John Webster Spargo. Cambridge, Massachusetts: Harvard University Press.
- Pulsiano, Philip and Elaine M. Treharne. 2001. A Companion to Anglo-Saxon Literature. Oxford: Blackwell Publishers.
- Saussure, Ferdinand de. 1879. Mémoire sur le système primitif des voyelles dans les langues indo-européennes. Leipzig: Teubner. (Dated 1879 but actually published in December 1878.)
- Saussure, Ferdinand de. 1972. Cours de linguistique générale, critical edition prepared by Tullio De Mauro on the basis of the third edition of 1922 (original edition 1916). Paris: Payot.
- Sturtevant, Edgar H. 1908. "Recent literature on comparative philology." The Classical Weekly 2.7:50-52.
- Szemerényi, Oswald. 1970. Einführung in die vergleichende Sprachwissenschaft. Darmstadt: Wissenschaftliche Buchgesellschaft.
  - English translation: Szemerényi, Oswald. 1996. Introduction to Indo-European Linguistics. Oxford: Oxford University Press.
- Zgusta, Ladislav. 2006. “The laryngeal and glottalic theories”, in History of the Language Sciences, vol. 3. Edited by Sylvain Auroux et al. Berlin: Walter de Gruyter, pp. 2462–2478.

== See also ==
- Indo-Semitic languages
