= Order of Flemish Militants =

Defunct Flemish nationalist organization

- Vlaamse Militanten Orde
- Other name: "Flemish Militants Organisation"
- Leaders: Bob Maes (1949–70); Bert Eriksson (1971–83)
- Founded: 1949
- Dissolved: 1983
- Country: Flanders, Belgium
- Ideology: Flemish nationalism Neo-Nazism; Racism; Anticommunism; Xenophobia
- Political position: Far-right
- Status: Inactive

The Order of Flemish Militants (Dutch: Vlaamse Militanten Orde or VMO) – originally the Flemish Militants Organisation (Vlaamse Militanten Organisatie) – was a Flemish nationalist activist group in Belgium defending far-right interests by propaganda and political action. Established in 1949, they helped found the People's Union (Dutch: Volksunie or VU) in 1954, a Belgian political party. The links between the extremist VMO and the VU lessened as the party moved towards the centre. In later decades the VMO would become linked to neo-Nazism and a series of paramilitary attacks on immigrants and leftists before disappearing by the late 1980s.

== Foundation and early years ==
In the years following the end of World War II, Flemish nationalists often fell victim in anti-Nazi rallies, manifestations and riots because of their anti-Belgicism and because the entire Flemish movement was discredited by military, political and economic collaboration with the Germans during World War II. The only outlets for organised Flemish nationalism were charitable groups dedicated to war veteran care or local branches of the dominant Christian Social Party (Christelijke Volkspartij, CVP) which, whilst not avowedly nationalist, did have a significant separatist wing.

The VMO was founded in 1949 by Bob Maes; it was part of a wave of Flemish nationalist groups that emerged that year, including Flemish Concentration (Vlaamse Concentratie, VC). VMO was in fact initially established as a steward group for the VC. The group sought the creation of an independent Flanders. Soon, the VMO started expanding and turned into a full-scale paramilitary organization. Between 1950 and 1970 it was heavily criticized by, but nevertheless tolerated by, the Ministry of Justice. On 14 December 1953, however, 16 individual VMO members were convicted for the possession of forbidden weapons earlier that year. The VMO itself was not convicted (since it was impossible at that time to prosecute a group on penal grounds, only individuals).

In 1954 the VMO became associated with the Christian Flemish People's Union (Christelijke Vlaamse Volksunie, CVV) and the more formal alliance of the People's Union (Volksunie, VU) that followed this group that same year. The VMO soon took over much of the propaganda and stewarding work for the VU although relations between the two groups became increasingly strained as the VU moved further towards a centrist position and the VMO hardened its rightist attitudes. A formal schism between the two organisations was announced in October 1963.

== First trial ==
On 14 June 1970, a trial against the VMO was initiated after violent clashes with supporters of the Democratic Front of Francophones at a rally, leaving one man dead, who suffered a heart attack, and several other severely injured. The VMO chairman Bob Maes decided to disband the VMO to protect the members from further prosecution. Soon after this, Maes was elected senator for the Volksunie and started defending more moderate points of view.

== The new VMO ==
Numerous members of the disbanded VMO did not support Maes' decision, and reconstituted the VMO on 12 June 1971 as "Vlaamse Militanten Orde", referring to the "Dinaso Militanten Orde". Several Flemish extremists, radicals, neo-fascists and racists were among the founding members, including the former Hitler Youth member Bert Eriksson, who emerged as leader of the new group. It undertook drilling exercises and paramilitary "fieldgames" and also co-operated with similar militia groups such as the Wehrsportsgruppe, exchanging members for drilling exercises. In 1974 it announced that it intended to take on an active role against leftists as well as its pro-Flemish independence agenda. When the far right Vlaams Blok was established in 1979, several VMO members also joined that party. Chief among these was Xavier Buisseret, who served as propaganda chief of the Vlaams Blok, having previously held high office in the VMO.

The new VMO became associated with a series of attacks on immigrants, Walloons and leftists as well as the organisation of annual international neo-Nazi rallies at Diksmuide, where representatives of the League of Saint George and the National States' Rights Party were amongst those in attendance. These rallies had initially been for Flemish only but in the late 1960s the VMO began to invite other rightist groups to participate and they eventually became an important annual event in the international neo-Nazi calendar. VMO also cooperated with Finnish Pekka Siitoin's groups that were likewise associated with right-wing terrorism for bombing and burning down a communist printing press Kursiivi and sending letter bombs to political enemies.

Especially close to the League of Saint George, the two groups were part of a wider network that also included the Deutsche Bürgerinitiative in Germany, the NSDAP/AO in the United States and France's Fédération d'action nationale et européenne. The group also sought, albeit unsuccessfully, to forge links with Irish republican groups and to this end distributed leaflets in support of Bobby Sands during his 1981 hunger strike. However, in a subsequent volte-face the VMO threw its lot in with Ulster loyalism and attempted to link up with the Ulster Volunteer Force (UVF). This came to nothing either however after the UVF rejected the VMO's request that they should target Jews, with the UVF a pro-Israeli group in opposition to the pro-Palestine stance of republicans.

In the seventies, VMO gained international attention by repatriating the corpses of former collaborators of World War Two to their homeland. In Austria, a VMO commando (Operation Brevier) claimed to have dug up the corpse of the priest Cyriel Verschaeve, a leading figure of the collaboration, and buried it again in Flemish soil. The dead bodies of Staf De Clercq, the former leader of the Vlaams Nationaal Verbond (Operation Delta), and Anton Mussert, the former Dutch NSB leader (Operation Wolfsangel), were also dug up and reburied in Flanders.

== The end of the VMO ==
In 1981, 106 VMO members were sentenced by the Antwerp Court to imprisonment although their sentences were overturned the following year on appeal. In 1983, the VMO was condemned as a private militia by the Ghent Court of Appeal and outlawed.

Despite this verdict, the VMO was considered to be active and operational until the late eighties, when several similar organizations were founded to replace the VMO. The two most successful of these VMO successors are the Odal Group and Voorpost.
