= 1954 Belgian general election =

← 1950	11 April 1954	1958 →

212 seats in the Chamber of Representatives
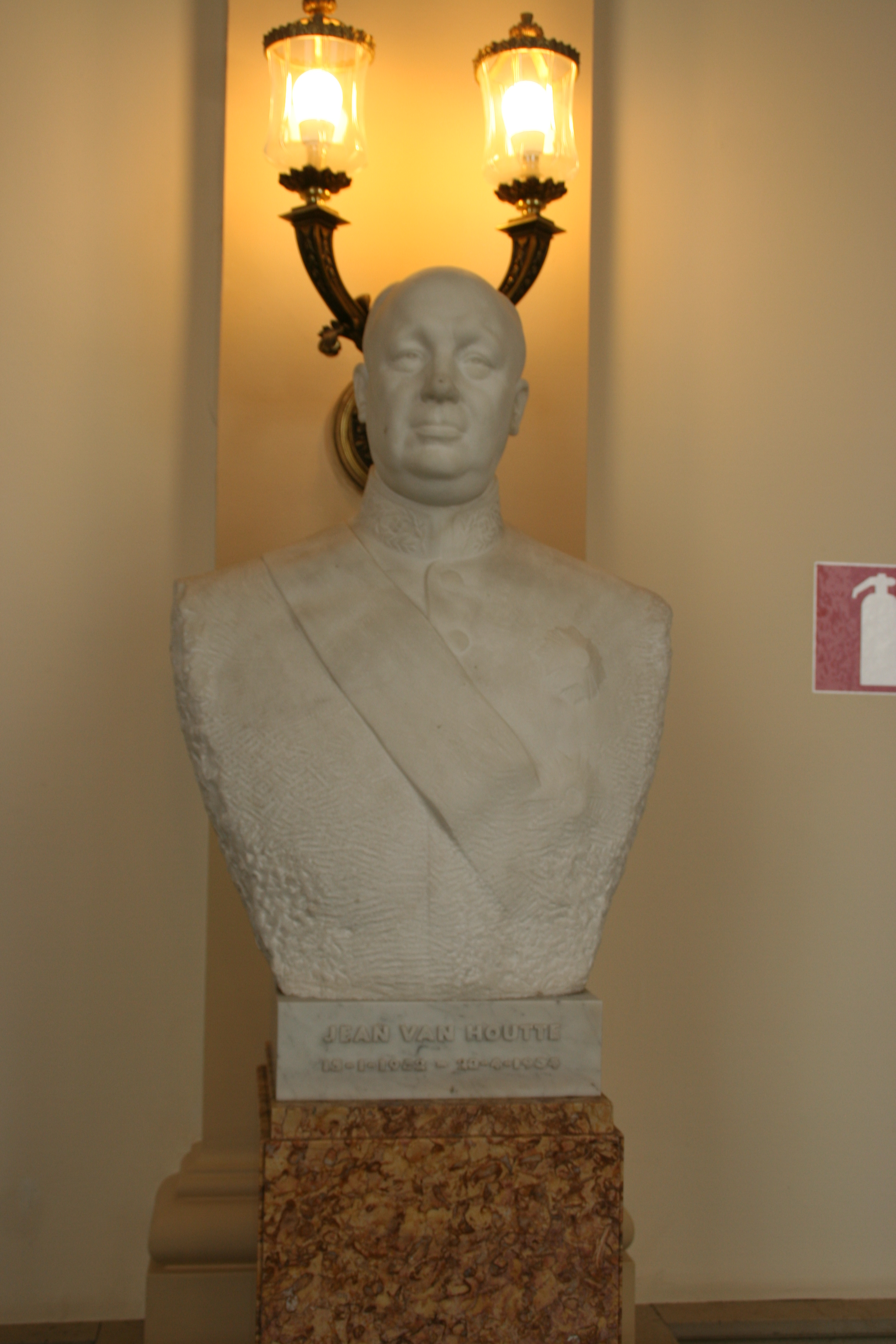

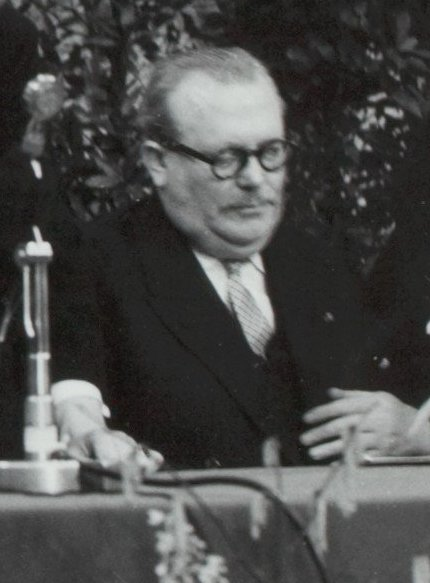

	First party	Second party	Third party
Leader	Jean Van Houtte	Achille Van Acker	Henri Liebaert
Party	Christian Social	Socialist	Liberal
Leader since	Candidate for PM	Candidate for PM	1953
Last election	108 seats, 47.68%	73 seats, 34.51%	20 seats, 11.25%
Seats won	95	82	24
Seat change	▼13	▲9	▲4
Popular vote	2,123,408	1,927,015	626,983
Percentage	41.15%	37.34%	12.15%
Swing	▼6.53%	▲2.83%	▲0.90%
	Fourth party	Fifth party	Sixth party
Leader	N/A	Edgard Lalmand	Walter Couvreur
Party	LSK	Communist	CVV
Leader since	N/A	1943	1954
Last election	4 seats, 1.77%	7 seats, 4.75%	New
Seats won	5	4	1
Seat change	▲1	▼3	New
Popular vote	108,175	184,108	113,632
Percentage	2.10%	3.57%	2.20%
Swing	▲0.33%	▼1.18%	New
- Chamber seat distribution by constituency
Government before election
van Houtte
Christian Social
Government after election
van Acker IV
BSP/PSB-Lib

General elections were held in Belgium on 11 April 1954. The dominant Christian Social Party won 95 of the 212 seats in the Chamber of Representatives and 49 of the 106 seats in the Senate. Voter turnout was 93.2%. Elections for the nine provincial councils were also held.

The outgoing Catholic government led by Jean Van Houtte lost their majority in parliament. The two other main parties, the Socialist and Liberal Party, subsequently formed a rare "purple" government with Achille Van Acker as Prime Minister. Both parties had an anti-clerical agenda and aimed to reverse policies of the Catholic government regarding private schools. This would become known as the Second School War.

== Results ==
=== Chamber of Deputies ===
Party	Votes	%	Seats	+/–
Christian Social Party	2,123,408	41.14	95	–13
Belgian Socialist Party	1,927,015	37.34	82	+9
Liberal Party	626,983	12.15	24	+4
Communist Party of Belgium	184,108	3.57	4	–3
Christian Flemish People's Union	113,632	2.20	1	New
Liberal–Socialist Kartels	108,175	2.10	5	+1
Christian Social Rally of Liberty	42,979	0.83	1	New
Radio Antwerp	10,177	0.20	0	New
Middle Class	9,729	0.19	0	New
Universal People	3,139	0.06	0	New
Veteran Combatants	1,839	0.04	0	New
Van Wonterghem	1,817	0.04	0	New
Liberal dissidents	1,807	0.04	0	New
Independent Social Party	1,613	0.03	0	New
Hubert List	1,143	0.02	0	New
Camus List	1,001	0.02	0	New
Independent Union	884	0.02	0	New
European Movement	581	0.01	0	New
Flemish Bloc	456	0.01	0	New
Mediator	191	0.00	0	New
Independents	246	0.00	0	0
Total	5,160,923	100.00	212	0
Valid votes	5,160,923	94.46		
Invalid/blank votes	302,668	5.54		
Total votes	5,463,591	100.00		
Registered voters/turnout	5,863,092	93.19		
Source: Belgian Elections

=== Senate ===
Party	Votes	%	Seats	+/–
Christian Social Party	2,127,699	41.63	49	–5
Belgian Socialist Party	1,915,213	37.48	42	+5
Liberal Party	620,979	12.15	11	+1
Communist Party of Belgium	181,843	3.56	2	–1
Liberal–Socialist Kartels	108,966	2.13	2	0
Christian Flemish People's Union	155,758	3.05	0	New
People's Union	155,758	3.05	0	New
Christian Social Rally of Liberty	155,758	3.05	0	New
Other parties	155,758	3.05	0	–
Total	5,110,458	100.00	106	0
Registered voters/turnout	5,863,092	–		
Source: Nohlen & Stöver, Belgian Elections
