= Jaak Gabriëls =

Belgian politician (1943–2024)

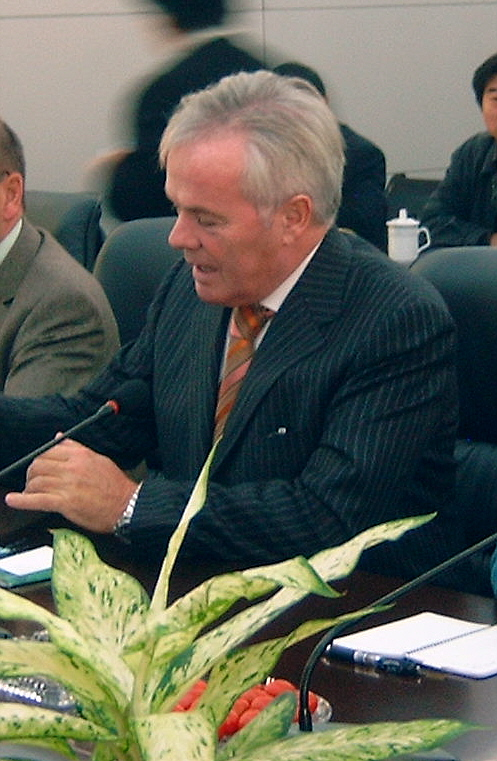
- Born: Petrus Josephus Jacobus Gabriëls; 22 September 1943; Bree, German-occupied Belgium
- Died: 8 April 2024 (aged 80); Bree
- Occupation: politician

Petrus Josephus Jacobus Gabriëls (22 September 1943 – 8 April 2024) was a Belgian politician and member of the Flemish Liberals and Democrats (VLD) (Dutch: Vlaamse Liberalen en Democraten or VLD). He graduated in 1965 at the Catholic University of Leuven as Master of Philosophy and Arts. He started his political career as a Provincial Councillor for Limburg from 1974 to 1977. From 1977 till the last day of December 2012 he was the Mayor of Bree, and from 1977 he was Member of the Chamber of Representatives. From 1995 to 1999 he was a Member of the Flemish Parliament.

Gabriëls was the leader of the People's Union (Dutch: Volksunie or VU) from 1986 to 1992 and was a founding member of the VLD. He also was Federal Minister of Agriculture and middle class (from 1999 to 2001) and Flemish Minister of Economy, Foreign Trade and Housing (from 2001 to 2003). He again became a Member of the Flemish Parliament in 2003 and he became a Minister of State in 2004.

Gabriëls died in Bree on 8 April 2024, at the age of 80.
