= 1961 Belgian general election =

- 26 March 1961

212 seats in the Chamber of Representatives
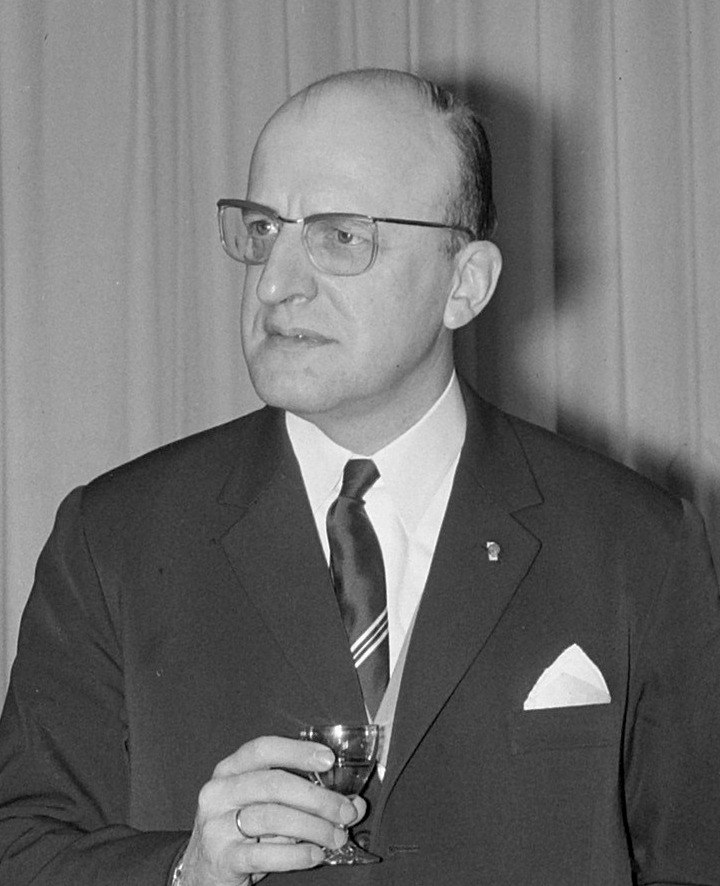

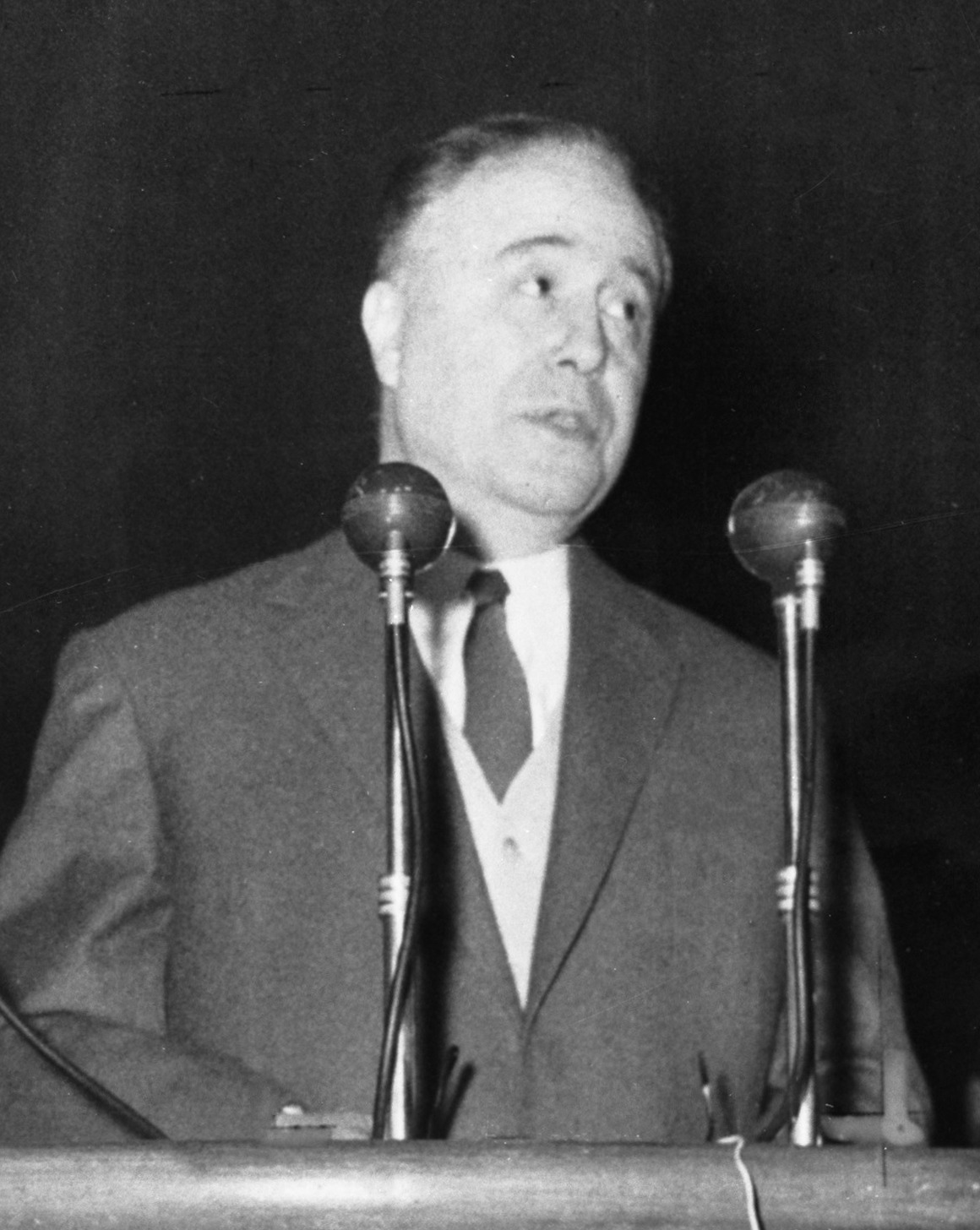

	First party	Second party	Third party
Leader	Théo Lefèvre	Léo Collard	Roger Motz
Party	Christian Social	Socialist	Liberal
Leader since	Candidate for PM	1959	1958
Last election	104 seats, 46.50%	80 seats, 35.79%	20 seats, 11.05%
Seats won	96	84	20
Seat change	▼8	▲4	Steady
Popular vote	2,182,642	1,933,424	649,376
Percentage	41.46%	36.72%	12.33%
Swing	▼5.04%	▲0.93%	▲1.28%
	Fourth party	Fifth party	Sixth party
Leader	Frans Van der Elst	Ernest Burnelle	Jean-Marie Evrard
Party	VU	Communist	RN
Leader since	1955	1954	1959
Last election	1 seat, 1.98%	2 seats, 1.89%	New
Seats won	5	5	1
Seat change	▲4	▲3	New
Popular vote	182,407	162,238	42,450
Percentage	3.46%	3.08%	0.81%
Swing	▲1.48%	▲1.19%	New
- Chamber seat distribution by constituency
Government before election
G. Eyskens IV
CVP/PSC-Lib
Government after election
Lefèvre
CVP/PSC-BSP/PSB

General elections were held in Belgium on 26 March 1961. The result was a victory for the Christian Social Party, which won 96 of the 212 seats in the Chamber of Representatives and 47 of the 106 seats in the Senate. Voter turnout was 92.3%. Elections for the nine provincial councils were also held.

Prior to the elections, the centre-right government of the Christian Social and Liberal Party led by Gaston Eyskens pushed through austerity measures with a law known as the Eenheidswet or Loi Unique, despite heavy strikes in the preceding weeks, especially in Wallonia. After the elections, the Christian Democrats formed a new government with the Socialist Party instead of the Liberal Party, with Théo Lefèvre as Prime Minister.

== Results ==
=== Chamber of Deputies ===
Party	Votes	%	Seats	+/–
Christian Social Party	2,182,642	41.46	96	–8
Belgian Socialist Party	1,933,424	36.72	84	+4
Liberal Party	649,376	12.33	20	0
People's Union	182,407	3.46	5	+4
Communist Party of Belgium	162,238	3.08	5	+3
National Rally	42,450	0.81	1	New
Independent Party	33,174	0.63	0	New
National Union of Independents	12,252	0.23	0	New
National Party	4,375	0.08	0	New
Liberal dissidents	3,956	0.08	0	New
Walloon Unity	3,466	0.07	0	New
Alleenstaande	3,101	0.06	0	New
Zelfstandig	2,307	0.04	0	New
Francophone Bloc	1,824	0.03	0	New
Gekavemus	604	0.01	0	New
Independent Workers	551	0.01	0	New
Universal People	480	0.01	0	New
EC Group	154	0.00	0	New
Independents	46,244	0.88	1	+1
Total	5,265,025	100.00	212	0
Valid votes	5,265,025	94.46		
Invalid/blank votes	308,815	5.54		
Total votes	5,573,840	100.00		
Registered voters/turnout	6,036,165	92.34		
Source: Belgian Elections

=== Senate ===
Party	Votes	%	Seats	+/–
Christian Social Party	2,200,323	42.12	47	–6
Belgian Socialist Party	1,924,605	36.84	45	+5
Liberal Party	637,922	12.21	11	+1
Communist Party of Belgium	163,576	3.13	1	0
People's Union	159,096	3.05	2	+2
National Movement	26,211	0.50	0	New
Independent Party	21,421	0.41	0	New
National Union of Independents	13,284	0.25	0	New
Liberal dissidents	7,711	0.15	0	New
National Rally	5,425	0.10	0	New
National Party	4,457	0.09	0	New
Walloon Unity	3,478	0.07	0	New
Francophone Bloc	1,947	0.04	0	New
Other parties	18,405	0.35	0	–
Independents	36,646	0.70	0	0
Total	5,224,507	100.00	106	0
Valid votes	5,224,507	93.73		
Invalid/blank votes	349,475	6.27		
Total votes	5,573,982	100.00		
Registered voters/turnout	6,036,165	92.34		
Source: Nohlen & Stöver, Belgian Elections
