= Bob Maes =

Belgian politician (1924–2025)

Member of the Senate of Belgium
- In office 7 November 1971 – 12 October 1985

Member of the Flemish Council
- In office 7 December 1971 – 12 October 1985

Personal details
- Born: Robert F. Maes; 22 October 1924; Zaventem, Belgium
- Died: 12 August 2025 (aged 100); Leuven, Belgium
- Political party: VU; N-VA
- Occupation: Nationalist activist

Robert F. Maes (22 October 1924 – 12 August 2025) was a Belgian Flemish nationalist and politician of the People's Union and the New Flemish Alliance.

== Life and career ==
Born in Zaventem on 22 October 1924, Maes was a member of the Vlaams Nationaal Jeugdverbond and the Vlaamsch Nationaal Verbond during World War II, which collaborated with the German occupation. In September 1944, he surrendered to the Belgian police, which imprisoned him for one year and banned him from political participation for 20 years.

In 1949, Maes founded the Order of Flemish Militants (VMO) at the request of Vlaamse Concentratie. In 1954, he joined the steering committee of the VU and served as its Brabant president from 1965 to 1995. On 12 September 1970, activists from the VMO killed Jacques Georgin, a poster-hanger for DéFi; Maes never condemned the attack. The following year, he formally dissolved the VMO. He then joined Were Di, becoming its vice-president in 1972. He continued contact with former members of the VMO, speaking at the Asse during the transfer of the body of Staf De Clercq.

In 1971, Maes was elected to the Cultural Council for the Dutch-speaking Cultural Community and the Senate. He served in these roles until 12 October 1985, when he became an honorary senator. He was excluded from governing coalitions due to his opposition to the Egmont pact under the government of Leo Tindemans. His concerned stemmed from the Francization of Brussels and its periphery in Flanders. He also stated that the pact did not give enough power to the regions and communities of Belgium. He was also a municipal councillor in Zaventem from 1971 to 1988. A controversy arose in October 2014 when Secretary of State for Asylum, Migration and Administrative Simplification Theo Francken attended Maes's 90th birthday, causing Prime Minister Charles Michel to call for Francken's resignation. Maes then reaffirmed that he did not regret collaborating with Nazi Germany.

Maes died on 12 August 2025, at the age of 100.
