= Walter Couvreur =

Walter Couvreur (1914–1996) was a Belgian philologist and for some ten years a Flemish politician. He studied classical and Oriental languages. He was a professor of Hittite and Tocharian at the University of Ghent.

== Biography ==
Couvreur published in 1947 the first comparative grammar of Tocharian that fully took Western Tocharian into account. He edited many manuscripts and was the President of the Higher Institute for Eastern, East European and African language and history. He was also a member of the Royal Academy for Language and Literature.

His linguistic activities also saw him involved in Dutch orthography, as a co-author of the Word list of the Dutch language, a list of words of the Dutch language that was published in 1954. He was for many years the secretary of the commission that was set up by the respective ministers of education of the Netherlands and of Belgium in 1947; it was entrusted with standardising Dutch spelling.

In the early postwar period, he became interested in Flemish nationalism and played a role in the Algemeen Nederlands Verbond. Later, he was active in the Vlaams Comité voor Federalisme and succeeded Corneel Heymans as its president. Together with Walloon federalists, he worked out a federal constitution for Belgium in 1954 and so he became involved in politics in that year by negotiating the election cartel Christian Flemish People's Union.

He was unsuccessful in elections that year but presided over the negotiations that led to the setting up of a new Flemish national party, People's Union (Belgium) (de Volksunie) and was its first president until mid-1955, when he resigned for personal reasons.

He was conferred a knighthood by the Belgian king in 1989.

Walter Couvreur, born 25.07.1914 in Antwerp, died in Edegem on 17.09.1996, 82 years old.
