= Christian Social Rally of Liberty =

Defunct political party in Belgium

The Christian Social Rally of Liberty (French: Rassemblement Social Chrétien de la Liberté, RSCL) was a political party in Belgium.

== History ==
The party was formed as a neo-populist breakaway from the Christian Social Party (PSC) established by André Saint-Rémy and Jean Evrard. In the 1954 general elections the party received 0.8% of the national vote and winning a single seat in the Chamber of Representatives, which was taken by Saint-Rémy. He returned to the PSC the following year. Evrand formed the National Rally.
