= Holger Pedersen (linguist) =

Danish linguist (1867–1953)

- Born: 7 April 1867; Gelballe, Kolding Municipality, Denmark
- Died: 25 October 1953 (aged 86); Hellerup, Denmark
- Education: University of Copenhagen
- Known for: Contributions to historical linguistics, including Pedersen's law, the ruki sound law, and early support for laryngeal theory
- Scientific career
- Fields: linguistics, comparative linguistics, historical linguistics
- Workplaces: University of Copenhagen

Holger Pedersen (Danish: [ˈhʌlˀkɐ ˈpʰe̝(ː)ðɐsn̩]; 7 April 1867 – 25 October 1953) was a Danish linguist who made significant contributions to language science and wrote about thirty authoritative works concerning several languages. He was born in Gelballe, Denmark, and died in Hellerup, next to Copenhagen.

== Education and academic career ==
Pedersen studied at the University of Copenhagen with Karl Verner, Vilhelm Thomsen, and Hermann Möller. He subsequently studied at the University of Leipzig with Karl Brugmann, Eduard Sievers, Ernst Windisch, and August Leskien.

In the fall of 1893, Pedersen enrolled at the University of Berlin, where he studied with Johannes Schmidt. The following year he studied Celtic languages and Sanskrit with Heinrich Zimmer at the University of Greifswald.

In 1895 he spent several months in the Aran Islands in Ireland to study the conservative form of Irish spoken there.

Pedersen submitted his doctoral dissertation to the University of Copenhagen in 1896. It dealt with aspiration in Irish. It was accepted and published in 1897. The dissertation committee included Vilhelm Thomsen and Otto Jespersen.

Also in 1897, Pedersen took a position as a lecturer on Celtic languages at the University of Copenhagen. In 1900 he became a reader in comparative grammar there. In 1902 he was offered a professorship at the University of Basel, which he declined, but was able at the same time to persuade the University of Copenhagen to establish an extraordinary professorship for him. Pedersen also turned down the offer in 1908 of a professorship at the University of Strassburg. Following the retirement of Vilhelm Thomsen in 1912, Pedersen acceded to Thomsen's chair at the University of Copenhagen. He remained at the University of Copenhagen for the rest of his life.

== Contributions to linguistics ==
In 1893, Pedersen traveled to Corfu with Karl Brugmann to study Albanian in place. Subsequently, Pedersen published a volume of Albanian texts collected on this journey. The publication was due to the recommendation of Brugmann and Leskien. He continued to publish work on Albanian for many years thereafter. Pedersen's work on Albanian is often cited in Vladimir Orel's Albanian Etymological Dictionary (1995).

Among students of the Celtic languages Pedersen is best known for his Vergleichende Grammatik der keltischen Sprachen, 'Comparative Grammar of the Celtic Languages', which is still regarded as the principal reference work in Celtic historical linguistics.

His Hittitisch und die anderen indoeuropäischen Sprachen, 'Hittite and the Other Indo-European Languages', represented a significant step forward in Hittite studies, and is often relied on in Friedrich's Hethitisches Elementarbuch (2d ed. 1960), the standard handbook of Hittite.

Also influential was his Tocharisch vom Gesichtspunkt der indoeuropäischen Sprachvergleichung, 'Tocharian from the Viewpoint of Indo-European Language Comparison'. For example, André Martinet states that his discussion of sound changes in Tocharian is "fondé sur la présentation du tokharien par Holger Pedersen," 'based on the presentation of Tocharian by Holger Pedersen'.

It was Pedersen who formulated the ruki law, an important sound change in Indo-Iranian, Baltic, and Slavic.

He is also known for the description of Pedersen's Law, a type of accentual shift occurring in Baltic and Slavic languages.

Pedersen endorsed the laryngeal theory at a time when it "was regarded as an eccentric fancy of outsiders". In his classic exposition of the theory, Émile Benveniste credits Pedersen as one of those who contributed most to its development, along with Ferdinand de Saussure, Hermann Möller, and Albert Cuny.

Two of Pedersen's theories have been receiving considerable attention in recent times after decades of neglect, often known today under the names of the glottalic theory and the Nostratic theory.

== Origin of the glottalic theory ==
In a work published in 1951, Pedersen pointed out that the frequency of b in Indo-European is abnormally low. Comparison of languages, however, shows that it would be normal if it had once been the equivalent voiceless stop p, which is infrequent or absent in many languages.

He also posited that the Indo-European voiced aspirates, bh dh gh, could be better understood as voiceless aspirates, ph th kh.

Pedersen therefore proposed that the three stop series of Indo-European, p t k, bh dh gh, and b d g, had at an earlier time been b d g, ph th kh, and (p) t k, with the voiceless and voiced non-aspirates reversed.

This theory attracted relatively little attention until the American linguist Paul Hopper and the two Soviet scholars Tamaz V. Gamkrelidze and Vyacheslav V. Ivanov proposed, in a series of articles culminating in a major work by Gamkrelidze and Ivanov published in 1984 (English translation 1995), that the Indo-European b d g series had originally been a glottalized series, p' t' k'. Under this form, the theory has attracted wide interest; however, since the original claim of typological oddity has been falsified, no direct evidence for glottalized stops has been found, in the last few years publications in support of the so-called glottalic model have been steadily declining, and "the traditional paradigm remains absolutely in place".

== Origin of the Nostratic theory ==
Pedersen seems to have first used the term "Nostratic" in an article on Turkish phonology published in 1903. The kernel of Pedersen's argument for Nostratic in that article was as follows ("Indo-Germanic" = Indo-European):

Grønbech considers it possible p. 69 that the Turkish word for "goose" could be borrowed from Indo-Germanic (Osm. kaz Yak. xās Chuv. xur). There are in my view three possibilities with regard to this word: coincidence, borrowing, and kinship. One must also reckon with this last possibility. Very many language stocks in Asia are without doubt related to the Indo-Germanic one; this is perhaps valid for all those languages which have been characterized as Ural–Altaic. I would like to unite all the language stocks related to Indo-Germanic under the name "Nostratic languages." The Nostratic languages occupy not only a very large area in Europe and Asia but also extend to within Africa; for the Semitic-Hamitic languages are in my view without doubt Nostratic. With regard to the proof of the relationship of the Nostratic languages, not only must all root etymologies and in general all etymological frivolities be kept at a distance, but one should in general not concern oneself with heaping up a mass of material. One should rather limit oneself to the rational consideration of a series of pronouns, negatives, in part also numerals which can be traced through several language stocks (in Turkish one is reminded of the Indo-Germanic by the negation -ma, -mä and the word-initial interrogative particle m, the interrogative pronoun kim, the pronoun of the first person män, the verbal ending of the 1. sing. -m, 1. plur. -myz, -miz and the ending -jin in the 1. sing. of the "optative," very reminiscent of the Indo-Germanic subjunctive [with the optative affix -a-, -ä-], the pronoun of the 2. sing. sän [cp. the IdG. verbal ending -s], the causative formation with -tur- [cp. IdG. -tōr nomen agentis; the Indo-Germanic causative also appears as if it were derived from a nomina agentis of the φορός type], the nomina actionis like Orkh. käd-im "clothing," several numerals: Orkh. jiti "7," jitm-iš "70," [with j = IdG. s as in Proto-Turk. *jib- "approach," Osm. jyldyz "Star": to Indo-Germanic word for "sun," jat- "lie": IdG. word for "sit"]; Proto-Turk. bǟš "5" [with š = IdG. -q^{u}e; cp. Osm. piš- "be cooked," IdG. *peq^{u}eti "cooks"] etc., etc.). I resist the temptation to enter into this question in more detail.

Pedersen's last sentence should be understood as referring to the article he was writing, not the rest of his career. Although he defined the Nostratic family, he himself never produced the work of synthesis the concept seemed to call for. That would await the work of the Russian scholars Illich-Svitych and Dolgopolsky in the 1960s for its first iteration. Nevertheless, Pedersen did not abandon the subject. He produced a substantial (if overlooked) article on Indo-European and Semitic in 1908. He produced a detailed argument in favor of the kinship of Indo-European and Uralic in 1933. In effect, the three pillars of the Nostratic hypothesis are Indo-Uralic, Ural–Altaic, and Indo-Semitic. Pedersen produced works on two of these three, so the impression is incorrect that he neglected this subject in his subsequent career. His interest in the Nostratic idea remained constant amid his many other activities as a linguist.

English "Nostratic" is the normal equivalent of German nostratisch, the form used by Pedersen in 1903, and Danish nostratisk (compare French nostratique). His 1931 American translator rendered nostratisk by "Nostratian," but this form did not catch on.

In his 1924 book, Pedersen defined Nostratic as follows:

As a comprehensive designation for the families of languages which are related to Indo-European, we may employ the expression Nostratian languages (from Latin nostrās "our countryman").

In his view, Indo-European was most clearly related to Uralic, with "similar, though fainter, resemblances" to Turkish, Mongolian, and Manchu; to Yukaghir; and to Eskimo. He also considered Indo-European might be related to Semitic and that, if so, it must be related to Hamitic and possibly to Basque. In his abovementioned 1903 article he expressed the view that the "Semitic-Hamitic" languages were "indubitably" included in Nostratic).

In modern terms, we would say he was positing genetic relationship between Indo-European and the Uralic, Altaic, Yukaghir, Eskimo, and Afro-Asiatic language families. (The existence of the Altaic family is controversial, and few would now assign Basque to Afro-Asiatic.)

However, in Pedersen's view the languages listed did not exhaust the possibilities for Nostratic:

The boundaries for the Nostratian world of languages cannot yet be determined, but the area is enormous, and includes such widely divergent races that one becomes almost dizzy at the thought.... The question remains simply whether sufficient material can be collected to give this inclusion flesh and blood and a good clear outline.

== Selected works ==
- 1893. "Das Präsensinfix n," in Indogermanische Forschungen 2, 285–332.
- 1895. Albanische Texte mit Glossar. Leipzig: S. Hirzel. (= Abhandlungen der Königlichen Sächsischen Akademie der Wissenschaften 15.3.)
- 1897. Aspirationen i Irsk (doctoral dissertation, University of Copenhagen). Leipzig: Spirgatis.
- 1903. "Türkische Lautgesetze, " in Zeitschrift der Deutschen Morgenländischen Gesellschaft 57, 535–561.
- 1908. "Die indogermanisch-semitische Hypothese und die indogermanische Lautlehre." Indogermanische Forschungen 22, 341–365.
- 1909-1913. Vergleichende Grammatik der keltischen Sprachen, 2 volumes. Göttingen: Vandenhoeck and Ruprecht.
- 1924. Sprogvidenskaben i det Nittende Aarhundrede. Metoder og Resultater. København: Gyldendalske Boghandel.
- 1931. Linguistic Science in the Nineteenth Century: Methods and Results, translated from the Danish by John Webster Spargo. Cambridge, Massachusetts: Harvard University Press. (English translation of Pedersen 1924. Reprinted in 1959 as The Discovery of Language: Linguistic Science in the Nineteenth Century, Bloomington: Indiana University Press; paperback edition 1962.)
- 1933a. Études lituaniennes. København: Ejnar Munksgaard.
- 1933b. "Zur Frage nach der Urverwandschaft des Indoeuropäischen mit dem Ugrofinnischen." Mémoires de la Société finno-ougrienne 67, 308–325.
- 1938. Hittitisch und die anderen indoeuropäischen Sprachen. Det Kongelige Danske Videnskabernes Selskab, Historisk-filologiske Meddelelser 25.2. København.
- 1941. Tocharisch vom Gesichtspunkt der indoeuropäischen Sprachvergleichung. København: Ejnar Munksgaard. (Second edition 1949.)
- 1951. Die gemeinindoeuropäischen und die vorindoeuropäischen Verschlusslaute. Det Kongelige Danske Videnskabernes Selskab, Historisk-filologiske Meddelelser 32.5. København.

== Sources ==
- Benveniste, Émile (1935), Origines de la formation des noms en indo-européen, Paris: Adrien Maisonneuve
- Friedrich, Johannes. 1960. Hethitisches Elementarbuch, second edition, 2 volumes. Heidelberg: Carl Winter.
- Gamkrelidze, Tamaz V.; Ivanov, Vyacheslav V. (1995) [Original Russian edition 1984], Indo-European and the Indo-Europeans, 2 volumes, Berlin and New York: Mouton de Gruyter
- Hopper, Paul J. (1973), "Glottalized and murmured occlusives in Indo-European", Glossa, 7 (2): 141–166
- Koerner, Konrad (1983) [Danish edition 1916], "Holger Pedersen: A sketch of his life and work." Introduction to A Glance at the History of Linguistics With Particular Regard to the Historical Study of Phonology by Holger Pedersen, translated by Caroline C. Henriksen, Amsterdam: John Benjamins
- Martinet, André (2005) [1955], Economie des changements phonétiques (Revised ed.), Paris: Maisonneuve et Larose
- Orel, Vladimir. 1995. Albanian Etymological Dictionary. Leiden: Brill.
- Szemerényi, Oswald (1996), Introduction to Indo-European Linguistics, Oxford University Press
