= Allan R. Bomhard =

American linguist (born 1943)

Allan R. Bomhard (born July 10 1943) is an American independent scholar writing books and predominantly self-published papers in the field of comparative linguistics and Buddhism. He is part of a small group of proponents of the Nostratic hypothesis, according to which the Indo-European languages, Uralic languages, Afroasiatic languages, and the Altaic languages would all belong to a larger macrofamily. As a prominent proponent of Nostratic, Bomhard's work has received attention from mainstream linguists and occasionally been discussed in linguistic sources. The majority of his work has been self published or printed through vanity presses. Mainstream linguists have dismissed his theories.

== Criticism ==
His theory about Nostratic languages is widely rejected by mainstream linguists as a fringe theory. Among Nostratists, he has been described as "a maximalist who casts his nets as widely as possible" among far-flung languages not generally believed to be related.

Russian linguists Georgiy Starostin, Mikhail Zhivlov, and Alexei Kassian have criticized his work as imprecise and "historically unrealistic".

== Books ==
- Toward Proto-Nostratic: A New Approach to the Comparison of Proto-Indo-European and Proto-Afroasiatic. Amsterdam: John Benjamins, 1984.
- Indo-European and the Nostratic Hypothesis. Charleston: SIGNUM Desktop Publishing, 1996.
- Reconstructing Proto-Nostratic: Comparative Phonology, Morphology, and Vocabulary. Leiden and Boston: Brill. 2 vols, 2008.
- The Nostratic Hypothesis in 2011: Trends and Issues. Washington, DC: Institute for the Study of Man, 2011.
- An Introductory Grammar of the Pali Language. Charleston: Charleston Buddhist Fellowship, 2012.
- A Sketch of Proto-Indo-Anatolian Phonology. Florence, SC USA, 2024.

with John C. Kerns:

- The Nostratic Macrofamily: A Study in Distant Linguistic Relationship. Berlin, New York, NY, and Amsterdam: Mouton de Gruyter, 1994.

with Arnaud Fournet:

- The Indo-European Elements in Hurrian. La Garenne Colombes / Charleston, 2010.

== See also ==
- Hermann Möller, Danish linguist
