= National Rally (Belgium) =

Defunct political party in Belgium

National Rally (French: Rassemblement National, RN) was a political party in Belgium led by Jean Evrard, who was previously member of the Christian Social Rally of Liberty.

== History ==
In the 1961 general elections the party received 0.8% of the vote and won a single seat in the Chamber of Representatives. It did not contest any further elections.
