= People's Union (Belgium) =

People's Union Volksunie
- Founded: December 15, 1954
- Dissolved: October 13, 2001
- Preceded by: Christian Flemish People's Union
- Succeeded by: New Flemish Alliance (right-wing faction) and Spirit (centre-left faction)
- Headquarters: Barricadenplein 12, Brussels, Belgium
- Youth wing: VUJO (Young People's Union)
- Activist wing: Order of Flemish Militants (until 1963)
- Ideology: Flemish nationalism; Liberalism
- Political position: Big tent
- European affiliation: European Free Alliance

Website
- www.volksunie.be (archived)

People's Union (Dutch: Volksunie, pronounced [ˈvɔlksˌyni], abbr. VU) was a Flemish nationalist political party in Belgium, formed in 1954 as a successor to the Christian Flemish People's Union.

The Volksunie defined itself as a big tent and catch-all party that combined support from the left and right with the main goal of focusing on increased Flemish autonomy and establishing more linguistic and political rights for the Flemish community. The party also based its platform on civic nationalism over radicalism in order to foster a more legitimate image. It also contained members sympathetic to federalism and full separatism, with its stance on whether to secede Flanders from Belgium or redefine Belgium as a federal nation in which Flanders had devolved power changing with its leadership. The VU participated in three coalitions with the Belgian government during its existence and has been credited by historians with successfully bringing the issue of Flemish nationalism to mainstream Belgian politics and implementing its federalist objectives. However, the party later suffered from ideological schisms which resulted in a decline in support before it was dissolved in 2001.

== Early history ==
The party was officially founded in 1954 as the successor to the Christian Flemish People's Union (Christelijke Vlaamse Volksunie, CVV) electoral alliance, which had successfully run for election that year. It originated from the loose Flemish movement, which included different organisations seeking to promote Flanders and call for more political freedom for the Flemish community. The Flemish movement varied from wanting to secure more linguistic, cultural and political rights for Flanders within the Belgian state to wanting the total secession of Flanders from Belgium or even reunification with the Netherlands under the Greater Netherlands concept. In the second half of the nineteenth century, Flemish nationalists operated within the established political partieshey chief and initially had close ties with the political left such as the Vermeylenfonds movement.

During the Second World War, previous Flemish nationalist groups such as the Flemish National League (Vlaamsch Nationaal Verbond, VNV) collaborated with the Nazis, who had promised them increased Flemish autonomy. That initially complicated the postwar re-emergence of Flemish nationalism although only a faction of the broader movement had actually pursued an agenda of collaboration. After the only outlets for organised Flemish nationalism were charitable groups dedicated to war veterans and the dominant Christian Social Party (Christelijke Volkspartij, CVV), which was not avowedly nationalist but had a separatist wing.

As a result, the Volksunie sought to build a strong alliance of Flemish nationalists under one movement but was careful to choose its leaders from nationalist circles that had not collaborated with the Nazis. Ideologically, the Volksunie preferred to position itself around the centre and saw itself as a coalition of various shades of Flemish thought as a big tent party with the objective of pursuing further autonomy and a sense of national identity for the Flemish region. To distance itself from prewar nationalism, the VU sought to promote its brand of nationalism as civic nationalism, as opposed to nationalism based on ethnic and racial sentiments, to gain credibility and wider support. As a result, the party was initially able to bring together various strands of scattered Flemish nationalists into a coherent movement. The party was closely aligned to the Order of Flemish Militants (Vlaamse Militanten Orde, VMO) during the 1950s, with the VMO handling propaganda, recruitment and campaign work for the VU. However, the groups began to drift apart, as the VU moved to the centre while the VMO began to turn to the extreme right. The two movements formally broke ties in 1963.

The party contained members from the left, right and centre of the political spectrum from socialists to right-wing conservatives, and it differed from other Belgian parties by putting Flemish nationalism at the forefront of its image and platform as opposed to basing its policies on a right or left-of-centre identity. At a European level, the Volksunie was a member of the European Free Alliance, which contained other separatist and regionalist parties.

== Initial success ==
The party initially proved successful and had members elected to the Chamber of Representatives (five) and the Senate (two) of the Belgian Federal Parliament in 1961. The party continued to grow in stature and reached the 11.0% at the national level in 1978 elections, gaining 21 representatives and went on to participate in the Belgian government as a coalition partner. This enabled the party to become the first electorally successful Flemish nationalist party and bring the agenda of Flemish autonomy on the mainstream political stage. In government, the VU was also able to ensure a Dutch language version of the Belgian constitution was adopted, gradually secured more regional powers for Flanders and worked to redefine Belgium as a federal rather than a unitary state.

== Ideological splits and decline ==
The acceptance of federalism in place of separatism by the VU in the 1970s did not sit well with the party's right-wing and separatist wing, and a split became inevitable, particularly after the party entered the coalition government of Leo Tindemans (CVP, Christian-Democrat). The right-wing separatist and national conservative faction broke away and organized itself in the Vlaams Blok, becoming a much stronger political force and surpassing Volksunie at the beginning of the 1990s (6.6% against VU's 5.9% in 1991 elections).

Although the party would continue to participate in two other coalition governments, the Volksunie continued its electoral decline (5.6% in 1999 elections against the 9.9% of the Vlaams Blok), with the internal divisions between the right-wing and left-wing members re-emerging in 2001. In the beginning of the 1990s, Bert Anciaux became party president and led the party in an ever more leftist and progressive direction, combining the social-liberal ideas of his iD21-movement with the regionalist course of the People's Union. These experiments were opposed by the more conservative leaning and separatist party base. Tension rose at the end of the 1990s when Geert Bourgeois of the centre-right nationalist wing, was elected chairman by party members, in preference to the incumbent and progressive Patrik Vankrunkelsven. Factions subsequently clashed multiple times, over the future course of the party and possible support for current state reform negotiations. On 13 October 2001 the party openly split into three factions: the progressive wing around Bert Anciaux, the conservative nationalist wing around Geert Bourgeois, and a centrist group opposing the imminent split. An internal referendum was held on the future of the party.

The right wing won a large plurality at a party referendum, with 47 percent. However, while it inherited Volksunie's structure, it did not take the Volksunie name due to falling short of a majority and not being allowed to use the party name under Belgian electoral law. Instead, it reconstituted itself as a new party, and re-registered itself as the New Flemish Alliance (Nieuw-Vlaamse Alliantie, or N-VA). The left wing under Anciaux broke off and became Spirit, while the liberal members joined the Flemish Liberals and Democrats. The two parties proceeded to form new electoral alliances, known in Belgium as cartels, with the N-VA allying with Christian Democratic and Flemish and Spirit with the Socialist Party - Different. These cartels broke up in 2008 as the parties continued their decline, until the N-VA experienced a sudden resurgence in 2009, eventually becoming the largest party in Flanders and going on to participate as a coalition partner in the Belgian government, while Spirit ceased to exist, merging with Groen.

== Ideology and legacy ==
The Volksunie did not follow the traditional left-right pattern of politics and instead presented itself as a big tent movement that encompassed policy ideas from all over the political spectrum, but regarded Flemish nationalism and autonomy as its core objective above all else. The VU promoted the use of the Dutch language and recognition of Flemish cultural identity and heritage. It also successfully called for the establishment of a Flemish Parliament, more devolved decision making powers, political reform, the separation of Flemish Brabant from the former Brabant province and the St. Michael's Agreement of 1992 which re-established Belgium as a federal country. Behind its nationalist image, the party's underlying ideology shifted with the leadership. For example, under the leadership of Jaak Gabriëls and Geert Bourgeois, the VU took on a right-wing identity whereas under Bert Anciaux the VU was steered in a centre-left direction. Although the party's focus on protecting Flemish interests initially attracted support, the ideological difference between the VU's wings and the acceptance of Federalism over full Flemish independence alienated the VU's separatist and national conservative flank who left to form Vlaams Blok, taking some of the VU's voters with it. By the early 2000s, the party's splits resulted in the more dominant conservative faction forming the N-VA (which adopted a position of supporting a confederal Belgian state as a means of paving the way for Flemish independence) and the centre-left faction becoming Spirit. A majority of former VU leaders and members either joined the N-VA or Spirit, with a smaller number joining the Open VLD, Vlaams Blok or the CD&V.

== Party chairman ==
- Walter Couvreur: 1954-1955
- Frans Van der Elst: 1955-1975
- Hugo Schiltz: 1975-1979
- Vic Anciaux: 1979-1986
- Jaak Gabriëls: 1986-1992
- Bert Anciaux: 1992-1998
- Patrik Vankrunkelsven: 1998-2000
- Geert Bourgeois: 2000-2001
- Fons Borginon: 2001

== Electoral results ==
=== Federal Parliament ===
Chamber of Representatives

Election year	# of overall votes	% of overall vote	% of language group vote	# of overall seats won	# of language group seats won	+/-	Government	Notes
1954	113,632	2.2 (#6)		1 / 212			in opposition	
1958	104,823	2.0 (#5)		1 / 212		0	in opposition	
1961	182,407	3.1 (#4)		5 / 212		▲4	in opposition	
1965	346,860	6.7 (#4)		12 / 212		▲7	in opposition	
1968	506,697	9.8 (#4)		20 / 212		▲8	in opposition	
1971	586,917	11.1 (#3)		21 / 212		▲1	in opposition	
1974	536,287	10.0 (#4)		22 / 212		▲1	in opposition	
1977	559,567	10.0		20 / 212		▼2	in coalition	
1978	388,762	7.0		14 / 212		▼6	in coalition	
1981	588,436	9.8		20 / 212		▲6	in opposition	
1985	477,755	7.9		16 / 212		▼4	in opposition	
1987	495,120	8.1		16 / 212		0	in coalition	
1991	363,124	5.9		10 / 212		▼6	in opposition	
1995	283,516	4.7		5 / 150		▼5	in opposition	
1999	345,576	5.6		8 / 150		▲3	in opposition	

=== Regional parliaments ===
==== Flemish Parliament ====
Election year	# of overall votes	% of overall vote	% of language group vote	# of overall seats won	# of language group seats won	+/–	Government	Notes
1995	338,173	9.0		9 / 124			in opposition	
1999	359,226	9.3		11 / 124		▲2	in coalition	

=== European Parliament ===
Election year	# of overall votes	% of overall vote	% of electoral college vote	# of overall seats won	# of electoral college seats won	+/–	Notes
1979	324,540		9.7	1 / 24	1 / 13		
1984	484,494		13.9	2 / 24	2 / 13	▲1	
1989	318,153		8.7	1 / 24	1 / 13	▼1	
1994	262,043		7.1	1 / 25	1 / 14	0	
1999	471,238	7.6	12.2	2 / 25	2 / 14	▲1	

== See also ==
- List of political parties in Flanders
