= Jerzy Kuryłowicz =

Polish linguist (1895–1978)

- Born: 26 August 1895; Stanisławów, Galicia, Austria-Hungary (now Ivano-Frankivsk, Ukraine)
- Died: 28 January 1978 (aged 82); Kraków, Poland

Academic work
- Discipline: Linguist
- Main interests: Indo-European languages

Jerzy Kuryłowicz (Polish pronunciation: [ˈjɛʐɨ kurɨˈwɔvit͡ʂ]; 26 August 1895 – 28 January 1978) was a Polish linguist whose main area of interest was historical linguistics, specifically Indo-European studies. He is known for identifying consonantal reflexes in Hittite that were previously only hypothesized by Ferdinand de Saussure, thereby offering first direct evidence for the laryngeal theory.

== Life ==
Born in Stanisławów, Galicia, Austria-Hungary (now Ivano-Frankivsk, Ukraine), Kuryłowicz was a Polish historical linguist, structuralist and language theoretician, deeply interested in the studies of Indo-European languages. He studied at the Vienna University of Economics and Business (1913–1914), and then, after World War I, continued his studies at Lwów University, where his unusual language skills drew the attention of some prominent linguists. As a result, he was granted a scholarship in Paris. This gave him an opportunity to qualify as a university professor of Indo-European linguistics soon after his return to Poland. After obtaining the title, he became a professor at the University of Lwów. Later on, in 1946-48 Kuryłowicz filled in for Dr Krzyżanowski at the Institute of English Philology in Wrocław. Finally, he moved to Kraków, where he took the chair of General Linguistics at Jagiellonian University. He retired in 1965. Kuryłowicz was a member of the Polish Academy of Learning and the Polish Academy of Science. He died at the age of 82 in Kraków.

He was a member of the Polish Academy of Learning and the Polish Academy of Sciences.

He was the brother of the microbiologist Włodzimierz Kuryłowicz. His son, also named Jerzy Kuryłowicz (1925–2002), obtained his PhD from the Warsaw University of Technology.

== Work in linguistics ==
Kuryłowicz did not belong to any of the structuralist linguistic schools. In his views he was close to glossematics, whose many assumptions he accepted and developed. He is best known for his works on the Indo-European languages. The most important ones are Apophony in Indo-European (1956) and The Inflectional Categories of Indo-European (1964). In the latter, he discussed the inflectional categories of Indo-European languages and later, on the basis of these studies, formulated the so-called Case Theory.

=== Laws of analogy ===
Building on prior work by Antoine Meillet, Kuryłowicz's is also known for his "Six Laws of Analogy" that have been widely used in historical linguistics to understand how analogical grammatical changes work. The laws consist of six predictive statements about the direction of analogical changes:

1. A bipartite marker tends to replace an isofunctional simple marker.
2. The directionality of analogy is from a “basic” form to a “subordinate” form with respect to their spheres of usage.
3. A structure consisting of a basic and a subordinate member serves as a foundation for a basic member which is isofunctional but isolated.
4. When the old (non-analogical) form and the new (analogical) form are both in use, the former remains in secondary function and the latter takes the basic function.
5. A more marginal distinction is eliminated for the benefit of a more significant distinction.
6. A base in analogy may belong to a prestige dialect affecting the form of a dialect imitating it.

=== Case theory ===
In this theory he proposes the division into grammatical and concrete cases. According to Kuryłowicz, the case is a syntactic or semantic relation expressed by the appropriate inflected form or by linking the preposition with a noun, so it is the category based on a relation inside the sentence or a relation between two sentences.

The category of case covers two basic case groups:

1. Grammatical cases: their primary function is syntactic, the semantic function is secondary. If we take the sentence: ‘The boy sat down’ (Fisiak 1975: 59) with an intransitive verb ‘sit’, we may notice that the sentence can be changed into causative construction: ‘’He made the boy sit down’’ (ibid), where the word ‘boy’ is changed from nominative into accusative, with the superior position of nominative. (Nominativus, accusativus)
2. Concrete cases: they include instrumentalis, locativus and ablativus, whose primary function is the adverbial semantic function. They answer the questions: with what?, where?, from where?. The syntactic function of concrete cases is secondary. These cases are governed by semantically determined verbs.

For example, the Polish verb kierować (to drive) governs the direct object in the instrumental case, as in the expression kierować samochodem (to drive a car) (Fisiak 1975: 60)

=== Laryngeals ===
While studying the phonology of Indo-European languages, Kuryłowicz pointed to the existence of the Hittite consonant ḫ in his 1927 paper "ə indo-européen et ḫ hittite". This discovery supported Ferdinand de Saussure’s 1879 proposal of the existence of coefficients sonantiques, elements that de Saussure reconstructed to account for vowel length alternations in Indo-European. This led to the so-called laryngeal theory, a major step forward in Indo-European linguistics and a confirmation of de Saussure's theory.

=== Syntactic transformation ===
In 1936 Kuryłowicz introduced the idea of syntactic transformation, pointing at the same time that this syntactic (transformative) derivation does not change the meaning of syntactic form. Therefore, if we take the sentence like: Kate washes the car. and change it into passive: The car is washed by Kate. we can notice that the second sentence has the same meaning as the first one. They differ just in terms of style. The idea of transformative derivation proves that Kuryłowicz was ahead of his times, because what he described resembles one of the main assumptions of Chomsky’s Transformative – Generative Grammar postulated some twenty years later.

=== Foundation concept ===
Kuryłowicz was also interested in the element hierarchy and the function of the language system. Analyzing the problem of hierarchy he introduced the concept of foundation, which is the relation between two forms or functions in a language. One of the forms or functions, so-called founding, always results in the presence of the founded, not conversely. For instance, in Latin, the endings -os and -or in the nominative singular both always correspond with the ending -orem in the accusative singular. This does not work the other way round, because the ending in the accusative does not allow one to predict the ending in the nominative case: it can be either -os or -or. (Fisiak 1975: 56)

== Publications ==
- Traces de la place du ton en gathique. Paris: Champion, 1925.
- Kuryłowicz, J., 1927a. “Les effets du ə en indoiranien”, Prace Filologiczne 11: 201–43.
- Kuryłowicz, J., 1927b. “ə indo-européen et ḫ hittite”, in Symbolae grammaticae in honorem Ioannis Rozwadowski, vol. 1. Edited by W. Taszycki & W. Doroszewski. Kraków: Gebethner & Wolff, pp. 95–104.
- Études indo-européennes. Kraków: Skład Główny w Ksiegarni Gebethnera i Wolffa, 1935.
- Kuryłowicz, J., 1936. “Derivation lexicale et derivation syntaxique”. In Kuryłowicz, J., 1960, 41–50.
- Kuryłowicz, J., 1938. “Struktura morfemu”. In Kuryłowicz, J., 51–65.
- Kuryłowicz, J., 1949a. “La nature des proces dits ‘analogiques’”. Acta Linguistica 5: 121–38.
- Kuryłowicz, J., 1949b. “La notion de l’isomorphisme”. In Kuryłowicz, J., 1960, 16–26.
- Kuryłowicz, J., 1949c. “Le probleme du classement des cas”. In Kuryłowicz, J., 1960, 131–154.
- L'apophonie en indo-européen. Wrocław: Zakład im. Ossolińskich, 1956.
- L'accentuation des langues indo-européennes. Wrocław: Zakład Narodowy im. Ossolińskich, 1958.
- Esquisses linguistiques. Wrocław–Kraków: Polska Akademia Nauk / Zakład Naroldowy im. Ossolíńskich, 1960.
- The Inflectional Categories of Indo-European. Heidelberg: Carl Winter, 1964.
- (with Manfred Mayrhofer) Indogermanische Grammatik. Heidelberg 1968 ff.
- Die sprachlichen Grundlagen der altgermanischen Metrik. Vortrag, gehalten am 3. Juni 1970 in Rahmen einer Vortragswoche d. Univ. Innsbruck aus Anlass ihrer 300-Jahr-Feier. Edited by Jerzy Kuryłowicz. Innsbruck: Institut für Vergleichende Sprachwissenschaft der Universität Innsbruck, 1970.
- Studies in Semitic grammar and metrics. Wrocław: Wydawn. Polskiej Akademii Nauk / Zakład Narodowy im. Ossolińskich; London: Curzon Press, 1972.
- Studia indoeuropejskie; or, Études indo-européennes. Edited by Jerzy Kuryłowicz et al. Wrocław: Zakład Narodowy im. Ossolińskich, 1974.
- Metrik und Sprachgeschichte. Wrocław: Zakład Narodowy im. Ossolińskich, 1975.
- Problèmes de linguistique indo-européenne. Wrocław: Zakład narodowy im. Ossolińskich, 1977.
- Studia językoznawcze, vol. 1: Wybór prac opublikowanych w języku polskim. Warsaw: Państwowe Wydawn. Nauk., 1987.

== Decorations and awards ==
- 1965: Honorary doctorate from the University of Vienna
- 1973: Austrian Decoration for Science and Art
