= Christian Flemish People's Union =

Flemish nationalist political party

Christian Flemish People's Union Christelijke Vlaamse Volksunie
- Founded: 1954
- Succeeded by: Volksunie
- Ideology: Flemish nationalism Christian democracy
- Political position: Right-wing

The Christian Flemish People's Union (Dutch: Christelijke Vlaamse Volksunie, CVV) was an electoral alliance sympathetic to the Flemish Movement which stood at the 1954 general elections in Belgium.

== History ==
In the 1954 general elections the alliance received 3.9% of the Flemish vote, winning a single seat in the Chamber of Representatives. It was dissolved when the People's Union was formed on 21 November 1954.
