= Indo-European studies =

Subfield of linguistics

- Geographic distribution of the major Indo-European subgroups across Eurasia.
- Field: Historical linguistics, Comparative linguistics, Archaeology, Genetics
- Origin: Late 18th century Europe
- Key people: Franz Bopp, Rasmus Rask, August Schleicher, Georges Dumézil, J. P. Mallory
- Purpose: Reconstruction of the Proto-Indo-European language and the culture of the Proto-Indo-Europeans

Indo-European studies (German: Indogermanistik) is an interdisciplinary field that examines the Indo-European languages and related cultural history through historical linguistics, comparative philology, archaeology, and genetics.

The discipline coalesced in late eighteenth- and nineteenth-century Europe as comparative linguists including Marcus Zuerius van Boxhorn, Franz Bopp, and August Schleicher refined methods for reconstructing a shared ancestry among the languages. Research centers on rebuilding the Proto-Indo-European language, homeland, and society by combining comparative analysis with archaeological, mythological, and genetic evidence to test models such as the Kurgan hypothesis. Dedicated programs, research centers, journals, and book series sustain Indo-European studies across Europe and North America.

== History ==
=== Naming ===
The term Indo-European was coined in 1813 by British scholar Sir Thomas Young to describe a newly discovered family of languages. Young used it as a geographical term to refer to languages spanning from the Indian subcontinent to Europe. At the time, there was no consensus on what to call this language family, and scholars proposed various alternative names:

- scythisch (M. Z. van Boxhorn, 1637)
- indo-germanique (C. Malte-Brun, 1810)
- Indoeuropean (Th. Young, 1813)
- japetisk (Rasmus C. Rask, 1815)
- indisch-teutsch (F. Schmitthenner, 1826)
- sanskritisch (Wilhelm von Humboldt, 1827)
- arisch (Christian Lassen, 1830)
- indokeltisch (A. F. Pott, 1840)
- arioeuropeo (G. I. Ascoli, 1854)
- aryan (F. M. Müller, 1861)
- aryaque (H. Chavée, 1867).

Rask's term japetisk ("Japhetic languages") derived from Japheth, son of the Biblical Noah. This naming paralleled Semitic (from Noah's son Shem) and Hamitic (from Ham). Both Japhetic and Hamitic are now obsolete terms, though "Hamito-Semitic" occasionally appears as a dated name for the Afro-Asiatic languages.

The term Indo-German entered English usage through J.C. Prichard in 1826, though he favored Indo-European. In French, A. Pictet established indo-européen in 1836. The German term Indogermanisch was introduced by Julius von Klapproth in 1823 to encompass both northern and southern branches of the language family. Franz Bopp used Indoeuropäisch from 1835 onward. August Friedrich Pott's work later popularized Indo-Germanisch, interpreting it to span from the easternmost to westernmost branches. This led to unproductive debates about whether Indo-Celtic or Tocharo-Celtic might be more appropriate names.

In modern usage, Indo-European and indo-européen dominate English and French academic writing. German scholarship primarily uses Indogermanisch, though Indoeuropäisch is gaining prominence. Dutch academic writing has largely transitioned from Indogermaans to Indo-Europees.

Indo-Hittite or Indo-Anatolian are sometimes used by those who accept the Indo-Hittite hypothesis.

=== Preliminary work ===
The ancient Greeks were aware that their language had changed since the time of Homer (about 730 BC). Aristotle (about 330 BC) identified four types of linguistic change: insertion, deletion, transposition and substitution. Romans were aware of the similarities between Greek and Latin. To explain these similarities, the ancients posited that Latin was derived from Greek — a view no longer held by modern scholars.

In the post-classical West, with the influence of Christianity, language studies were undermined by the attempt to derive all languages from Hebrew since the time of Saint Augustine. Prior studies classified the European languages as Japhetic. One of the first scholars to challenge the idea of a Hebrew root to the languages of Europe was Joseph Scaliger (1540 – 1609). He identified Greek, Germanic, Romance and Slavic language groups by comparing the word for "God" in various European languages. In 1710, Leibniz applied ideas of gradualism and uniformitarianism to linguistics in a short essay. Like Scaliger, he rejected a Hebrew root, but also rejected the idea of unrelated language groups and considered them all to have a common source.

Around the 12th century, similarities between European languages became recognised. In Iceland, scholars noted the resemblances between Icelandic and English. Gerald of Wales claimed that Welsh, Cornish, and Breton were descendants of a common source. A study of the Insular Celtic languages was carried out by George Buchanan in the 16th century and the first field study was by Edward Lhuyd around 1700. He published his work in 1707, shortly after translating a study by Paul-Yves Pezron on Breton.

Grammars of European languages other than Latin and Classical Greek began to be published at the end of the 15th century. This led to comparison between the various languages.

In the 16th century, visitors to India became aware of similarities between Indian and European languages. For example, Filippo Sassetti reported striking resemblances between Sanskrit and Italian.

=== Early Indo-European studies ===
In his 1647 essay, Marcus Zuerius van Boxhorn proposed the existence of a primitive common language he called "Scythian". He included in its descendants Dutch, German, Latin, Greek, and Persian, and his posthumously published Originum Gallicarum liber of 1654 added Slavic, Celtic and Baltic. The 1647 essay discusses, as a first, the methodological issues in assigning languages to genetic groups. For example, he observed that loanwords should be eliminated in comparative studies, and also correctly put great emphasis on common morphological systems and irregularity as indicators of relationship. A few years earlier, the Silesian physician Johann Elichmann (1601/02 – 1639) already used the expression ex eadem origine (from a common source) in a study published posthumously in 1640. He related European languages to Indo-Iranian languages (which include Sanskrit).

The idea that the first language was Hebrew continued to be advanced for some time: Pierre Besnier (1648 – 1705) in 1674 published a book which was translated into English the following year: A philosophical essay for the reunion of the languages, or, the art of knowing all by the mastery of one.

Leibniz in 1710 proposed the concept of the so-called Japhetic language group, consisting of languages now known as Indo-European, which he contrasted with the so-called Aramaic languages (now generally known as Semitic).

The concept of actually reconstructing an Indo-European proto-language was suggested by William Wotton in 1713, while showing, among others, that Icelandic ("Teutonic"), the Romance languages and Greek were related.

In 1741 Gottfried Hensel (1687 – 1767) published a language map of the world in his Synopsis Universae Philologiae. He still believed that all languages were derived from Hebrew.

Mikhail Lomonosov compared numbers and other linguistic features in different languages of the world including Slavic, Baltic ("Kurlandic"), Iranian ("Medic"), Finnish, Chinese, Khoekhoe ("Hottentot") and others. He emphatically expressed the antiquity of the linguistic stages accessible to comparative method in the drafts for his Russian Grammar published in 1755:

Imagine the depth of time when these languages separated! ... Polish and Russian separated so long ago! Now think how long ago Kurlandic! Think when Latin, Greek, German, and Russian! Oh, great antiquity!

Gaston-Laurent Coeurdoux (1691 – 1779) sent a Mémoire to the French Académie des inscriptions et belles-lettres in 1767 in which he demonstrated the similarity between the Sanskrit, Latin, Greek, German and Russian languages.

Despite the above, the discovery of the genetic relationship of the whole family of Indo-European languages is often attributed to Sir William Jones, a British judge in India, who, in a 1786 lecture (published 1788) remarked:

The Sanskrit language, whatever be its antiquity, is of a wonderful structure; more perfect than the Greek, more copious than the Latin, and more exquisitely refined than either, yet bearing to both of them a stronger affinity, both in the roots of verbs and the forms of grammar, than could possibly have been produced by accident; so strong indeed, that no philologer could examine them all three, without believing them to have sprung from some common source, which, perhaps, no longer exists.

In his 1786 The Sanskrit Language, Jones postulated a proto-language uniting six branches: Sanskrit (i.e. Indo-Aryan), Persian (i.e. Iranian), Greek, Latin, Germanic and Celtic. In many ways his work was less accurate than his predecessors', as he erroneously included Egyptian, Japanese and Chinese in the Indo-European languages, while omitting Hindi.

In 1814 the young Dane Rasmus Christian Rask submitted an entry to an essay contest on Icelandic history, in which he concluded that the Germanic languages were (as we would put it) in the same language family as Greek, Latin, Slavic, and Lithuanian. He was in doubt about Old Irish, eventually concluding that it did not belong with the others (he later changed his mind), and further decided that Finnish and Hungarian were related but in a different family, and that "Greenlandic" (Kalaallisut) represented yet a third. He was unfamiliar with Sanskrit at the time. Later, however, he learned Sanskrit, and published some of the earliest Western work on ancient Iranian languages.

August Schleicher was the first scholar to compose a tentative reconstructed text in the extinct common source that Van Boxhorn and later scholars had predicted (see: Schleicher's fable). The reconstructed Proto-Indo-European language (PIE) represents, by definition, the common language of the Proto-Indo-Europeans. This early phase culminates in Franz Bopp's Comparative Grammar of 1833.

=== Later Indo-European studies ===
The classical phase of Indo-European comparative linguistics leads from Bopp to August Schleicher's 1861 Compendium and up to Karl Brugmann's 5-volume Grundriss (outline of Indo-European languages) published from 1886 to 1893. Brugmann's Neogrammarian re-evaluation of the field and Ferdinand de Saussure's proposal of the concept of "consonantal schwa" (which later evolved into the laryngeal theory) may be considered the beginning of "contemporary" Indo-European studies. The Indo-European proto-language as described in the early 1900s in its main aspects is still accepted today, and the work done in the 20th century has been cleaning up and systematizing, as well as the incorporation of new language material, notably the Anatolian and Tocharian branches unknown in the 19th century, into the Indo-European framework.

Notably, the laryngeal theory, in its early forms barely noticed except as a clever analysis, became mainstream after the 1927 discovery by Jerzy Kuryłowicz of the survival of at least some of these hypothetical phonemes in Anatolian. Julius Pokorny in 1959 published his Indogermanisches etymologisches Wörterbuch, an updated and slimmed-down reworking of the three-volume Vergleichendes Wörterbuch der indogermanischen Sprachen of Alois Walde and Julius Pokorny (1927 – 1932). Both of these works aim to provide an overview of the lexical knowledge accumulated until the early 20th century, but with only stray comments on the structure of individual forms; in Pokorny 1959, then-recent trends of morphology and phonology (e.g., the laryngeal theory), go unacknowledged, and he largely ignores Anatolian and Tocharian data.

The generation of Indo-Europeanists active in the last third of the 20th century, such as Oswald Szemerényi, Calvert Watkins, Warren Cowgill, Jochem Schindler, Helmut Rix, developed a better understanding of morphology and, in the wake of Kuryłowicz's 1956 L'apophonie en indo-européen, ablaut. Rix's Lexikon der indogermanischen Verben appeared in 1997 as a first step towards a modernization of Pokorny's dictionary; corresponding tomes addressing the noun, Nomina im Indogermanischen Lexikon, appeared in 2008, and pronouns and particles, Lexikon der indogermanischen Partikeln und Pronominalstämme, in 2014. Current efforts are focused on a better understanding of the relative chronology within the proto-language, aiming at distinctions of "early", "middle" and "late", or "inner" and "outer" PIE dialects, but a general consensus has yet to form. From the 1960s, knowledge of Anatolian began to be of a certainty sufficient stage to allow it to influence the image of the proto-language (see also Indo-Hittite).

Such attempts at recovering a sense of historical depth in PIE have been combined with efforts towards linking the history of the language with archaeology, notably with the Kurgan hypothesis. J. P. Mallory's 1989 In Search of the Indo-Europeans and 1997 Encyclopedia of Indo-European Culture gives an overview of this. Purely linguistic research was bolstered by attempts to reconstruct the culture and mythology of the Proto-Indo-Europeans by scholars such as Georges Dumézil, as well as by archaeology (e. g. Marija Gimbutas, Colin Renfrew) and genetics (e. g. Luigi Luca Cavalli-Sforza). These speculations about the realia of Proto-Indo-European culture are however not part of the field of comparative linguistics, but rather a sister-discipline.

== List of Indo-European scholars ==
(historical; see below for contemporary IE studies)

- Friedrich Schlegel (1772 – 1829)
- Jakob Grimm (1785 – 1863)
- Rasmus Rask (1787 – 1832)
- Franz Bopp (1791 – 1867)
- August Friedrich Pott (1802 – 1887)
- Theodor Benfey (1809 – 1881)
- Hermann Grassmann (1809 – 1877)
- Otto von Böhtlingk (1815 – 1904)
- Rudolf von Raumer (1815 – 1876)
- Georg Curtius (1820 – 1885)
- August Schleicher (1821 – 1868)
- Max Müller (1823 – 1900)
- William Dwight Whitney (1827 – 1894)
- August Fick (1833 – 1916)
- August Leskien (1840 – 1916)
- Franz Kielhorn (1840 – 1908)
- Wilhelm Scherer (1841 – 1886)
- Berthold Delbrück (1842 – 1922)
- Vilhelm Thomsen (1842 – 1927)
- Johannes Schmidt (1843 – 1901)
- Ernst Windisch (1844 – 1918)
- K. A. Verner (1846 – 1896)
- Hermann Osthoff (1846 – 1909)
- Karl Brugmann (1849 – 1919)
- Hermann Möller (1850 – 1923)
- Jakob Wackernagel (1853 – 1938)
- Otto Schrader (1855 – 1919)
- Ferdinand de Saussure (1857 – 1913)
- Wilhelm August Streitberg (1864 – 1925)
- Hermann Hirt (1865 – 1936)
- Antoine Meillet (1866 – 1936)
- Holger Pedersen (1867 – 1953)
- Alois Walde (1869 – 1924)
- Eduard Schwyzer (1874 – 1943)
- Ferdinand Sommer (1875 – 1962)
- Bedřich Hrozný (1879 – 1952)
- Franklin Edgerton (1885 – 1963)
- Julius Pokorny (1887 – 1970)
- Manu Leumann (1889 – 1977)
- Milan Budimir (1891 – 1975)
- Jerzy Kuryłowicz (1895 – 1978)
- Roman Jakobson (1896 – 1982)
- Giacomo Devoto (1897 – 1974)
- Georges Dumézil (1898 – 1986)
- Christian Stang (1900 – 1977)
- Émile Benveniste (1902 – 1976)
- Ernst Risch (1911 – 1988)
- Oswald Szemerényi (1913 – 1996)
- Karl Hoffmann (1915 – 1996)
- Georg Renatus Solta (1915 – 2005)
- Winfred P. Lehmann (1916 – 2007)
- Edgar Charles Polomé (1920 – 2000)
- Marija Gimbutas (1921 – 1994)
- Ladislav Zgusta (1924 – 2007)
- Manfred Mayrhofer (1926 – 2011)
- Helmut Rix (1926 – 2004)
- Warren Cowgill (1929 – 1985)
- Johanna Narten (1930 – 2019)
- Calvert Watkins (1933 – 2013)
- Jean Haudry (1934 - 2023)
- Anna Morpurgo Davies (1937 – 2014)
- Jens Elmegård Rasmussen (1944 – 2013)
- Jochem Schindler (1944 – 1994)

== Contemporary IE study centres ==
The following universities have institutes or faculties devoted to Indo-European studies:

Country	Universities/Institutions	Scholars
Austria	Innsbruck; Vienna	Hannes A. Fellner (Vienna), Ivo Hajnal (Innsbruck), Melanie Malzahn (Vienna), Laura Grestenberger (Vienna)
Croatia	University of Zagreb	Ranko Matasović
Czech Republic	Charles University in Prague; Masaryk University, Brno	Václav Blažek (Masaryk), Dita Frantíková (Prague)
Denmark	Copenhagen	Birgit Anette Olsen, Thomas Olander
France	Paris; Nancy	Daniel Petit (Paris),, Agnes Korn (Paris), David Sasseville (Paris), Carlotta Viti (Nancy),
Germany	Marburg; Cologne; Erlangen; Frankfurt am Main; Humboldt University of Berlin; Göttingen; Halle; Jena; Munich; Würzburg	Olav Hackstein (Munich), Martin Joachim Kümmel (Jena), Daniel Kölligan (Würzburg), Ilya Yakubovich (Marburg), Elisabeth Rieken (Marburg), Eugen Hill (Cologne), Theresa Roth (Berlin),, Götz Keydana (Göttingen), Sabine Häusler (Halle),, Stefan Schaffner (Erlangen),, Gerd Carling (Frankfurt),
Greece	Cyprus	Alexander Nikolaev
Italy	Universita degli Studi di Pavia; Universita degli Studi di Palermo	Silvia Luraghi (Pavia)
Netherlands	Leiden	Leonid Kulikov, Alexander Lubotsky, Alwin Kloekhorst, Michaël Peyrot
Poland	Jagiellonian University	Ronald Kim (Poznań)
Slovenia	Ljubljana	Varja Cvetko Oresnik
Spain	Madrid; Salamanca	Francisco Rodríguez Adrados, Blanca María Prósper
Sweden	Uppsala; Stockholm	Christiane Schaefer (Uppsala), Jenny Larsson (Stockholm),, Axel Palmér (Uppsala),
Switzerland	Basel; Zürich	Paul Widmer (Zurich), Michiel de Vaan (Basel)
United Kingdom	Oxford; Cambridge	James Clackson (Cambridge), Andreas Willi (Oxford)
United States	Cornell; Harvard; UCLA; Texas	Benjamin W. Fortson IV, Hans Heinrich Hock, Jay Jasanoff, Anthony D. Yates, Andrew Sihler, Winfred P. Lehmann, Hrach Martirosyan, Craig Melchert, Alan Nussbaum, Eric P. Hamp, Jaan Puhvel

== Study methods ==
The comparative method was formally developed in the 19th century and applied first to Indo-European languages. The existence of the Proto-Indo-Europeans had been inferred by comparative linguistics as early as 1640, while attempts at an Indo-European proto-language reconstruction date back as far as 1713. However, by the 19th century, still no consensus had been reached about the internal groups of the IE family.

The method of internal reconstruction is used to compare patterns within one dialect, without comparison with other dialects and languages, to try to arrive at an understanding of regularities operating at an earlier stage in that dialect. It has also been used to infer information about earlier stages of PIE than can be reached by the comparative method.

The IE languages are sometimes hypothesized to be part of super-families such as Nostratic or Eurasiatic.

== Academic publications ==
=== Journals ===
- Kuhn's Zeitschrift KZ since 1852, in 1988 renamed to Historische Sprachforschung HS
- Indogermanische Forschungen IF since 1892
- Glotta since 1909
- Bulletin de la Société de Linguistique de Paris BSL since 1869
- Die Sprache since 1949
- Münchner Studien zur Sprachwissenschaft MSS since 1952
- Journal of Indo-European Studies JIES since 1973
- Tocharian and Indo-European Studies since 1987
- Studia indo-europaea since 2001
- International Journal of Diachronic Linguistics and Linguistic Reconstruction IJDL Munich since 2004
- Indo-European Linguistics IEUL since 2012

=== Book series ===
- Leiden Studies in Indo-European, founded 1991
- Copenhagen Studies in Indo-European, founded 1999
- Leiden Indo-European Etymological Dictionary Series, founded 2005

== See also ==
- Historical linguistics

== Sources ==
- Arvidsson, Stefan (June 1999). "Aryan Mythology As Science and Ideology". Journal of the American Academy of Religion. 67 (2). Oxford University Press: 327–354. doi:10.1093/jaarel/67.2.327. JSTOR 1465740.
- Arvidsson, Stefan (2006). Aryan Idols: Indo-European Mythology as Ideology and Science. University of Chicago Press. ISBN 0226028607.
- Carlson, Maria (2008). "A Detailed Look at Stefan Arvidsson's Aryan Idols". University of Kansas.
- Louden, Mark L.; Justus, Carol F.; King, Robert D. (Fall 2000). "In Memoriam: Edgar Charles Polomé" (PDF). American Journal of Germanic Linguistics. 12 (2). Cambridge University Press: 181–186. doi:10.1017/S1040820700002675. Archived from the original (PDF) on September 5, 2019.
- Polomé, Edgar C. (1999). "About Dumézil". Journal of Indo-European Studies. 27 (1): 248–251. ProQuest 206808390.
