= Nomina im Indogermanischen Lexikon =

2008 etymological dictionary

- Author: Dagmar S. Wodtko, Britta Irslinger, Carolin Schneider
- Language: German
- Subject: Proto-Indo-European nominals
- Publisher: Universitätsverlag Winter
- Publication date: 2008
- Publication place: Germany
- Pages: 863
- ISBN: 978-3-8253-5359-9

Nomina im Indogermanischen Lexikon (NIL, "Nominals in the Indo-European Lexicon") is an etymological dictionary of the Proto-Indo-European (PIE) nominals, that is, nouns and adjectives. It appeared in 2008, edited by German linguists Dagmar S. Wodtko, Britta Irslinger, and Carolin Schneider. Like other modern PIE dictionaries, NIL utilizes the modern three-laryngeal theory for its reconstructions.

== History ==
During the 2000s, scientists at the University of Freiburg worked on a project called "Indogermanisches Nomen" ("Indo-European Nominal"), comprising a volume on nominal inflection, to become part of Manfred Mayrhofer's series on Indo-European grammar; a dictionary called Lexikon der indogermanischen Nomina (LIN, "Lexicon of the Indo-European Nominals" in analogy to the Lexikon der indogermanischen Verben, LIV); and a work on PIE primary adjectives. Eventually, the project was cancelled due to cutting of funds.

In 2008, a reduced version of the LIN was published under the title Nomina im Indogermanischen Lexikon. It includes only a limited selection of words and is lacking the planned grammatical section, which should have listed PIE nominal inflection types (again in analogy to the LIV) along with their scope of use and syntactic implications. Still, an overview of PIE mechanisms for deriving nominals from verbs – root nouns, suffixes, vṛddhi derivations, etc. – is included.

== Entries ==
Part of the entries are based on noun stems (for example *h₁éḱu̯o- 'horse') or adjectival stems (*dʰeu̯b- 'deep'), while a large number of PIE nominals are derived from verbal roots (such as *bʰeh₂- 'shine, glow').

The entries are modelled on the concept of the LIV. Each contains

- the conjectured meaning of the stem or root,
- reconstructed stems and derivations with their reflexes in the daughter languages,
- extensive footnotes (with references, remarks on alternative and dubious reconstructions, etc., sometimes exceeding ten pages for a single entry),
- the page numbers of the corresponding LIV, IEW, EIEC and LIPP entries, where they exist.

The daughter languages often have changed the meanings of inherited words. Consequently, many of NIL's entries contain words with widely different meanings. For example, the entry *dʰeu̯b- 'deep' treats the Lithuanian words dubùs 'deep' and dubuõ 'bowl, pelvis', Old Irish dub 'dark, black', and Albanian det 'sea', among many others. *bʰeh₂- 'shine, glow' lists derivatives with meanings as diverse as 'a light, insight, appearance, wrath, white, clean.'

== Reviews ==
- Olsen, Birgit Anette (2011). "Dagmar Wodtko, Britta Irslinger u. Carolin Schneider: Nomina im Indogermanischen Lexikon". Beiträge zur Geschichte der deutschen Sprache und Literatur. 133 (2). Berlin: De Gruyter: 316–319. doi:10.1515/bgsl.2011.031.
- Красухин, Константин Геннадьевич (2010). "[Рец. на:] D. Wodtko, B. Irslinger, C. Schneider. Nomina im indogermanischen Lexikon". Вопросы языкознания (in Russian) (2). Москва: Наука: 128–140.
- Blažek, Václav (2009). "Dagmar S. Wodtko, Britta Irslinger, Carolin Schneider. 2008. Nomina im Indogermanischen Lexikon". Lingua Posnaniensis. 51 (1): 173–180. doi:10.2478/v10122-009-0013-y.

== See also ==
- Proto-Indo-European nominals

=== Other PIE dictionaries and grammars ===
- Grundriß der vergleichenden Grammatik der indogermanischen Sprachen (published 1886–1916 by Karl Brugmann and Berthold Delbrück)
- Indogermanisches etymologisches Wörterbuch (IEW, first published 1956 by Julius Pokorny), with reconstructions pre-dating laryngeal theory
- Indo-European Etymological Dictionary, an ongoing project based in Leiden, intended to result in the publication of a comprehensive Indo-European etymological dictionary
