= Lexikon der indogermanischen Verben =

Etymological dictionary

- LIV, 2nd edition
- Author: Helmut Rix, Martin Kümmel et al.
- Language: German
- Subject: Proto-Indo-European verb
- Publisher: Dr. Ludwig Reichert Verlag
- Publication date: 1998, 2001
- Publication place: Germany
- Media type: Print (Hardcover)
- Pages: 754 (1st edition); 823 (2nd edition)
- ISBN: 3-89500-219-4
- OCLC: 47295102
- Dewey Decimal: 415/.03 21
- LC Class: P572 .L58 2001

The Lexikon der indogermanischen Verben (LIV, 'lexicon of Indo-European verbs') is an etymological dictionary of the Proto-Indo-European (PIE) verb. The first edition appeared in 1998, edited by Helmut Rix. A second edition followed in 2001. The book may be seen as an update to the verb entries of the Indogermanisches etymologisches Wörterbuch (IEW) by Julius Pokorny. It was the first dictionary fully utilizing the modern three-laryngeal theory with reconstructions of Indo-European verbal roots.

== The LIV's hypothesis about aspect ==
The authors of the LIV assume a dichotomy between telic verbs (terminated: for example, *leh₂p- 'to light up') and atelic verbs (ongoing: for example, *bʰeh₂- 'to shine') in early stages of Proto-Indo-European. Before the daughter languages split off, aspect emerged as a new grammatical category.

Telic verbs were interpreted as aorist forms, and the missing present was formed with various suffixes (for example, *leh₂p-: *l̥h₂p-sḱé-) and the nasal infix (*l̥h₂-né-p-), all of which are supposed to come from old grammatical forms of uncertain meaning.

Atelic verbs were interpreted as present forms, and the missing aorist was formed with the suffix -s-, yielding the sigmatic aorist.

This hypothesis is used to explain various phenomena:

- Some verbs in Indo-European languages form root presents (Latin dūcō 'I pull, I lead', from PIE *dewk-, *duk-) and derived sigmatic aorists (perfect forms in Latin: dūxī 'I have pulled, I have led', pronounced *dūksī, from *déwk-s-).
- Other verbs form root aorists (Latin vīcī 'I have won', pronounced wīkī, from *weyk-, *wik-) and derived present forms (vincō 'I win', from *wi-n-k-, with nasal infix).
- For many PIE verbs, various present forms can be reconstructed without discernible differences in meaning (like *l̥h₂-né-p- and *l̥h₂p-sḱé- above, both forms have attested reflexes in IE languages: Greek λάμπω 'I shine' and Proto-Celtic *laske- 'to shine, burn', (Note: Presupposed by Proto-Celtic *loskī-, a secondarily formed causative reconstructed on the basis of Old Irish loscaid and Middle Welsh llosci 'to burn') respectively).

In addition to the present and the aorist, the following aspects are assumed:

- Perfect
- Causative-Iterative
- Desiderative
- Intensive (repetition)
- Fientive (onset of a new state)
- Essive (persistent state)

== Entries ==
The lexical part contains for each verbal root

- the conjectured meaning,
- reconstructed stems with their reflexes in the daughter languages,
- extensive footnotes (with references, remarks on alternative and dubious reconstructions, etc.),
- the page number of the corresponding IEW entry.

== Indices ==
The book includes

- a regressive root index,
- an index of reconstructed primary stems, sorted by aspect and formation rule,
- an index of reflexes in the daughter languages, sorted by language.

== Reception and criticism ==
- Seebold claims insufficient evidence for roots reconstructed from a single daughter language. Helmut Rix insists in the preface to the second edition that the assessment of the evidence should be left to the reader.
- Seebold criticises some of the conjectured meanings. Rix calls this criticism "basically legitimate".
- Meier-Brügger tentatively calls the LIV's aspect hypothesis "adequate and capable of consensus" (adäquat und konsensfähig), without agreeing on all of the details of the analysis.
- Fortson calls the LIV "[v]ery useful and up-to-date — though in various places controversial", without elaborating on the controversial elements.
- Ringe states that the theories in Rix (what he terms the "Cowgill-Rix verb") largely reflect current consensus among conservative experts, while opining that this verbal system is not a very plausible ancestor of the one found in Hittite and hence may post-date the split between Anatolian and the other Indo-European branches.

== See also ==
- Proto-Indo-European verb

=== Other PIE dictionaries and grammars ===
- Grundriß der vergleichenden Grammatik der indogermanischen Sprachen (published 1886–1916 by Karl Brugmann and Berthold Delbrück)
- Indogermanisches etymologisches Wörterbuch (IEW, first published 1956 by Julius Pokorny), with reconstructions pre-dating the laryngeal theory
- Indo-European Etymological Dictionary, an ongoing project based in Leiden, intended to result in the publication of a comprehensive Indo-European etymological dictionary
- Nomina im Indogermanischen Lexikon (NIL), structured similarly to the LIV and treating PIE nouns and adjectives
- Lexikon der indogermanischen Partikeln und Pronominalstämme (LIPP), structured similarly to the LIV and treating PIE particles and pronouns.
