= Indogermanische Forschungen =

- Discipline: Indo-European studies
- Language: English, French, German
- Edited by: Benjamin W. Fortson, Götz Keydana, Melanie Malzahn, Paul Widmer

Publication details
- History: 1892–present
- Publisher: Walter de Gruyter
- Frequency: Annually
- Impact factor: 0.5 (2025)

Standard abbreviations
- ISO 4: Indoger. Forsch.

Indexing
- ISSN: 0019-7262 (print); 1613-0405 (web)
- LCCN: 10328401
- OCLC no.: 406587027

Links
- Journal homepage

Indogermanische Forschungen (English: Indo-European Researches; subtitled Zeitschrift für Indogermanistik und historische Sprachwissenschaft/Journal of Indo-European Studies and Historical Linguistics) is an annual peer-reviewed academic journal of linguistics. It focuses primarily on Indo-European studies, but also publishes contributions on other languages and linguistic fields. It was established in 1892 by Karl Brugmann and Wilhelm Streitberg and published until vol. 37 (1916/17) by Verlag Karl J. Trübner. Starting with vol. 38 (1917/20) it has been published on an annual basis by Walter de Gruyter. Vols. 1–43 were supplemented with the Anzeiger für indogermanische Sprach- und Altertumskunde. Beiblatt zu den Indogermanischen Forschungen, a review journal edited by Streitberg.

The editors-in-chief are Benjamin W. Fortson (University of Michigan), Götz Keydana, Melanie Malzahn, Paul Widmer.

== Abstracting and indexing ==
The journal is abstracted and indexed in Scopus, ERIH PLUS, and Linguistic Bibliography Online. According to the Journal Citation Reports, the journal has a 2025 journal impact factor of 0.5.

== Editors ==
The following persons are or have been editors-in-chief of the journal:

Volumes	Year	Editors
1–37	1892–1916/17	Karl Brugmann, Wilhelm Streitberg
38–39	1917/20–1921	Karl Brugmann†, Wilhelm Streitberg
40–43	1922–1926	Wilhelm Streitberg
44–54	1927–1936	Ferdinand Sommer, Albert Debrunner
55–56	1937–1938	Ferdinand Sommer, Albert Debrunner, Gerhard Deeters
57–59.1	1940–1944	Ferdinand Sommer, Gerhard Deeters
59.2–62	1949–1956	Ferdinand Sommer, Albert Debrunner, Gerhard Deeters, Hans Krahe
63	1958	Ferdinand Sommer, Albert Debrunner, Gerhard Deeters, Hans Krahe
64–65	1959–1960	Ferdinand Sommer, Gerhard Deeters, Hans Krahe
66	1961	Ferdinand Sommer, Hans Krahe
67–70	1962–65	Hans Krahe, Wolfgang P. Schmid
71–101	1966–1996	Wolfgang P. Schmid
102–115	1997–2010	Wolfgang P. Schmid, Eckhard Eggers
116	2011	Eckhard Eggers
117–119	2012–2014	Michael Meier-Brügger, Elisabeth Rieken, Paul Widmer
120–121	2015–2016	Benjamin W. Fortson, IV, Elisabeth Rieken, Paul Widmer
122–125	2017–2020	Benjamin W. Fortson, IV, Götz Keydana, Elisabeth Rieken, Paul Widmer
126–	2021–	Benjamin W. Fortson, IV, Götz Keydana, Melanie Malzahn, Paul Widmer
