= Grundriß der vergleichenden Grammatik der indogermanischen Sprachen =

Book by Karl Brugmann and Berthold Delbrück

Grundriß der vergleichenden Grammatik der indogermanischen Sprachen (German for 'Outline of the Comparative Grammar of the Indo-European Languages') is a major work of historical linguistics by Karl Brugmann and Berthold Delbrück, published in two editions between 1886 and 1916. Brugmann treated phonology and morphology, and Delbrück treated syntax. The grammar of Proto-Indo-European (PIE) is reconstructed from those of its daughter languages known in the late 19th century. The work represents a major step in Indo-European studies, after Franz Bopp's Comparative Grammar of 1833 and August Schleicher's Compendium of 1871. Brugmann's neogrammarian re-evaluation of PIE resulted in a view that in its essence continued to be valid until present times.

== First edition ==
- Brugmann
  - Volume I: Phonology (1886)
  - Volume II, Part I: Noun (1888)
  - Volume II, Part II: Numerals and Pronouns, Verb (1892)
  - Indices (1893)
- Delbrück
  - Volume III: Syntax, Part I (1893)
  - Volume IV: Syntax, Part II (1897)
  - Volume V: Syntax, Part III (1900)

The volumes of the first edition were translated into English by Joseph Wright (Volume I), Robert S. Conway and William H. D. Rouse (Volume II and the Indices) shortly after their appearance.

== Second edition ==
Immediately after publication of the first edition, Brugmann began to work on an extensively revised second edition of his portion of the Grundriß:

- Volume I: (1897)
- Volume II.1: (1906)
- Volume II.2: (1911)
- Volume II.3: (1916)

== See also ==
- Proto-Indo-European language
- Proto-Indo-European root
- Indo-European studies

=== PIE dictionaries ===
- Indogermanisches etymologisches Wörterbuch (IEW, first published 1956 by Julius Pokorny)
- Lexikon der indogermanischen Verben (LIV, published 1998 and 2001 by Helmut Rix and others)
- Indo-European Etymological Dictionary, an ongoing project based in Leiden, intended to result in the publication of a comprehensive Indo-European etymological dictionary
