= Indogermanisches etymologisches Wörterbuch =

1959 dictionary by Julius Pokorny

The Indogermanisches etymologisches Wörterbuch (IEW; "Indo-European Etymological Dictionary") was published in 1959 by the Austrian-Czech comparative linguist and Celtic languages expert Julius Pokorny. It is an updated and slimmed-down reworking of the three-volume Vergleichendes Wörterbuch der indogermanischen Sprachen (1927–1932, by Alois Walde and Julius Pokorny).

Both of these works aim to provide an overview of the lexical knowledge of the Proto-Indo-European language accumulated through the early 20th century. The IEW is now significantly outdated, especially as it was conservative even when it was written, ignoring the now integral laryngeal theory, and hardly including any Anatolian material.

== Editions ==
- A. Francke, 1st ed. (1959)
- French & European Publications (1969), ISBN 0-8288-6602-3
- A. Francke, 4th ed. (2002); 5th ed. (2005), ISBN 3-7720-0947-6

== See also ==
- Proto-Indo-European language
- Proto-Indo-European root

Other Proto-Indo-European language dictionaries and grammars

- Grundriß der vergleichenden Grammatik der indogermanischen Sprachen (published 1886–1916 by Karl Brugmann and Berthold Delbrück)
- Lexikon der indogermanischen Verben (LIV, published 1998 and 2001 by Helmut Rix and others)
- Indo-European Etymological Dictionary, an ongoing project based in Leiden, intended to result in the publication of a comprehensive Indo-European etymological dictionary and described by its authors as a successor of the IEW
