= Hermann Hirt =

German linguist (1865–1936)

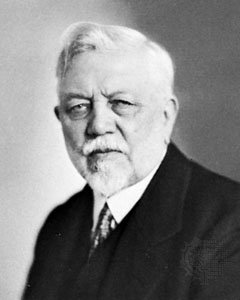
- Born: 19 December 1865; Magdeburg, Province of Saxony, Kingdom of Prussia (now Magdeburg, Germany)
- Died: 12 September 1936 (aged 70); Gießen, Nazi Germany (now Gießen, Germany)

Academic background
- Education: University of Leipzig

Academic work
- Discipline: Linguistics
- Sub-discipline: Indo-European linguistics
- Institutions: University of Giessen
- Notable ideas: Hirt's law; Dreimorengesetz

Hermann Hirt (19 December 1865 – 12 September 1936) was a German philologist and Indo-Europeanist.

== Career ==
Hirt wrote on German metres (Untersuchungen zur westgermanischen Verskunst, 1889), edited Schopenhauer's Parerga (1890), and then devoting himself to Indo-European philology made special studies on accent, writing Der indogermanische Accent (1895) and Der indogermanische Ablaut, vornehmlich in seinem Verhältnis zur Betonung (1900).

Hirt, who became professor at the University of Leipzig, made valuable contributions to Brugmann and Streitberg's Indogermanische Forschungen, on the morphology of case endings. In 1902, he published Handbuch der griechischen Laut- und Formenlehre, the first volume of a series of Indo-European textbooks of which he was editor. He is the author of the Indogermanische Grammatik, published in seven volumes between 1921 and 1937. Hirt made foundational contributions to the study of accent and ablaut in the Proto-Indo-European language.

== Bibliography ==
- Hirt H (1895). Der indogermanische Akzent. Strassburg:Trübner.
- Hirt H (1900). Der indogermanische Ablaut, vornehmlich in seinem Verhältnis zur Betonung. Strassburg: Trübner.
- Hirt H (1902). Handbuch der griechischen Laut- und Formenlehre (2nd edn., 1912). Strassburg: Trübner.
- Hirt H (1905–1907). Die Indogermanen. Ihre Verbreitung, ihre Heimat und ihre Kultur (2 vols). Strassburg: Trübner.
- Hirt H (1909). Etymologie der neuhochdeutschen Sprache. München: Beck (2nd edn., 1921).
- Hirt H (1921–1937). Indogermanische Grammatik (7 vols). Heidelberg: Winter.
- Hirt H (1931–1934). Handbuch des Urgermanischen (3 vols). Heidelberg: Winter.
- Hirt H (1939). Hauptprobleme der indogermanischen Sprachwissenschaft. Hrsg. und bearbeitet von H. Arntz. Halle: Niemeyer.
- Hirt H (1940). Indogermanica. Forschungen über Sprache und Geschichte Alteuropas. Halle: Niemeyer.
