= Hermann Osthoff =

German linguist (1847–1909)

Hermann Ostoff
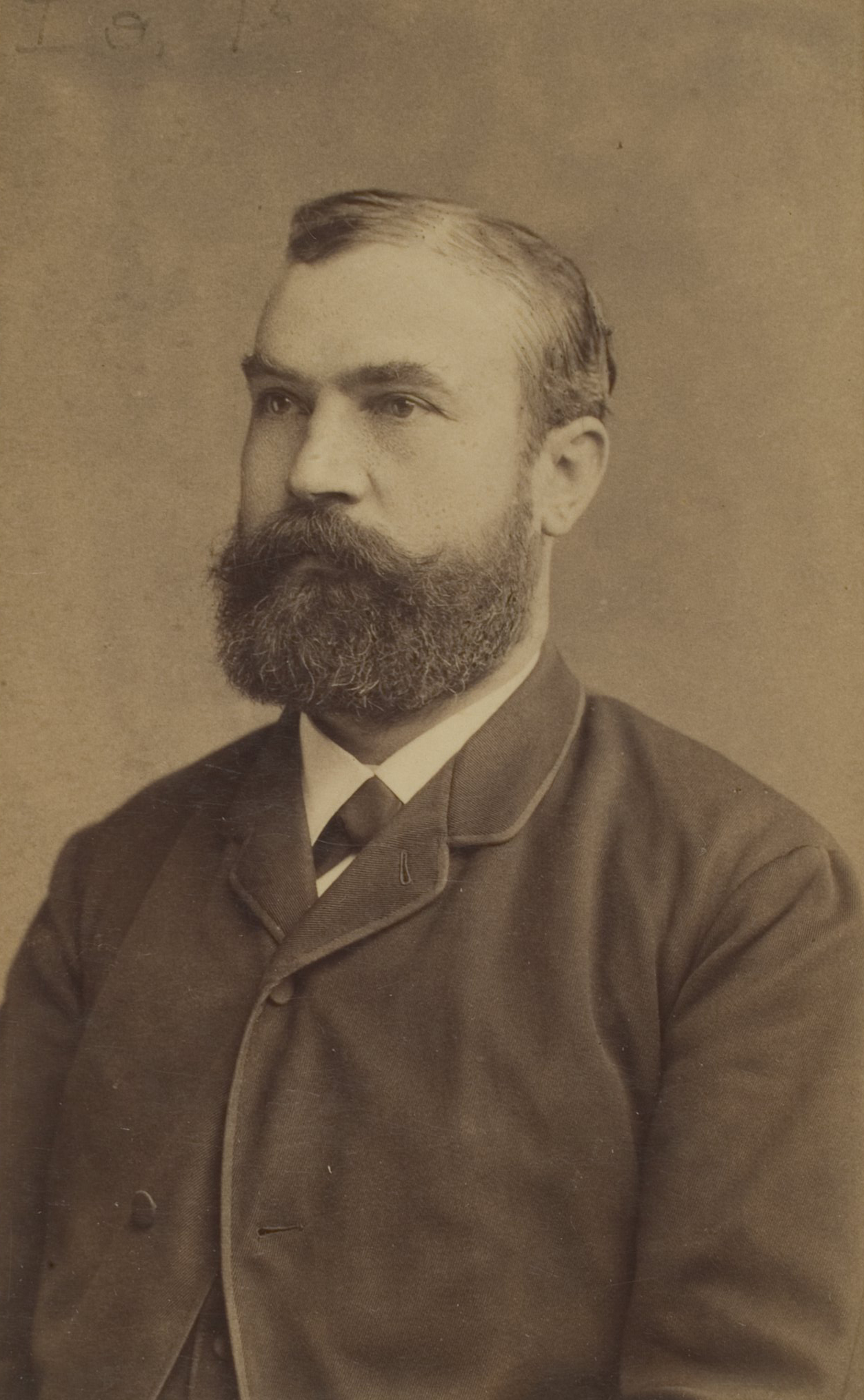
- Osthoff during his professorship at Heidelberg University
- Born: 18 April 1847; Billmerich, Kingdom of Prussia (now Unna, Germany)
- Died: 7 May 1909 (aged 62); Heidelberg, German Empire
- Known for: Osthoff's law
- Scientific career
- Fields: historical linguistics, Indo-European studies

Hermann Osthoff (18 April 1847 – 7 May 1909) was a German linguist. He was involved in Indo-European studies and the Neogrammarian school. He is known for formulating Osthoff's law and published widely on Indo-European word-formation and morphology.

== Life ==
Osthoff studied classical philology, Germanic philology, Sanskrit and comparative linguistics in Berlin, Tübingen and Bonn. In 1869 he obtained his doctorate in Bonn as a student of Hermann Usener. During his time in that city, he became a member of the Burschenschaft Alemannia of Bonn. From 1871 onward, he taught classes at the gymnasium in Kassel. In 1875, he successfully completed his postdoctoral habilitation at the University of Leipzig, and in 1877, was named an associate professor of comparative linguistics and Sanskrit at the Heidelberg University. Shortly afterwards, he was granted full professorship at Heidelberg, where he later served as dean (1894/95) and vice-rector (1899–1900).

The main focus of his research was in Indo-European languages. Along with Karl Brugmann and August Leskien, he was a significant figure in the founding of the Neogrammarians. He was a vocal critic of a young Ferdinand de Saussure's pioneering work Mémoire sur le système primitif des voyelles dans les langues indo-européennes, in which the 20-year-old Saussure postulated the laryngeal theory in 1879. However, Saussure's theory was confirmed with the discovery of Hittite in the early 20th century.

== Selected works ==
- Morphologische Untersuchungen auf dem Gebiete der indogermanischen Sprachen (with Karl Brugmann); (6 volumes, 1878–1910) – Morphological studies in the field of Indo-European languages.
- Das Verbum in der Nominalcomposition im Deutschen, Griechischen, Slavischen und Romanischen, 1878 – The verb in nominal composition in German, Greek, Slavic and Romance.
- Das physiologische und psychologische Moment in der sprachlichen Formenbildung, 1879 – The physiological and psychological moment in linguistic morphogenesis.
- Zur Geschichte des Perfects im Indogermanischen, 1884 – History of perfects in Indo-European.
