= Osthoff's law =

Indo-European sound law

Osthoff's law is an Indo-European sound law which states that long vowels shorten when followed by a resonant (Proto-Indo-European language (PIE) *m, *n, *l, *r, *y, *w), followed in turn by another consonant (i.e. in a closed syllable environment). It is named after German Indo-Europeanist Hermann Osthoff, who first formulated it.

== Overview ==
The law operated in most of the Proto-Indo-European daughter languages, with notable exceptions being the Indo-Iranian and Tocharian branches in which the difference between long and short PIE diphthongs was clearly preserved.

Compare:

- PIE *dyēws "skyling, sky god" > Vedic Sanskrit dyā́us, but Ancient Greek Ζεύς, with an ordinary diphthong.

The term Osthoff's law is usually properly applied to the described phenomenon in Ancient Greek, which itself was an independent innovation from similar developments occurring in Latin and other Indo-European languages. However, the term is often used loosely as a cover term referring to all shortening of long diphthongs in closed syllables.

Osthoff's law is, in some version, valid for Greek, Latin, and Celtic but not for Indo-Iranian and Tocharian.

== Germanic ==
Osthoff's law also probably applied in Germanic, although there is very little evidence to support or refute that claim. Some examples might be:

- *mēmso- "meat" > *mimza-
- *h₂yuh₁n̥ḱós "young" > *jungaz

== Balto-Slavic ==
The traditional school of Balto-Slavic linguistics posits compensatory lengthening of liquid diphthongs before laryngeals. Following this, long vowels become acuted, and the long vowels subsequently shorten again due to Osthoff's law, leaving an acuted liquid diphthong. For example:

- PIE *bʰerHǵós "birch" > PBSl. *bḗrźas > *bérˀźas > Lithuanian béržas, Serbo-Croatian brȅza (by liquid metathesis).

Some linguists, most notably Kortlandt and Derksen, reject the idea of compensatory lengthening before laryngeals, instead positing that the acute reflects laryngeals directly. Moreover, they reject Osthoff's law for Proto-Balto-Slavic, and reconstruct long vowels intact, but only if they are inherited from Proto-Indo-European. One particular case that may reflect an inherited long vowel is *mḗms, which is reflected in all descendants without an acute. It appears in Lithuanian as mėsà, with ⟨ė⟩ reflecting a Balto-Slavic long vowel, as opposed to ⟨ę⟩.

== See also ==
- Glossary of sound laws in the Indo-European languages
- Szemerényi's law
- Stang's law
