= Gottfried Hensel =

German linguist

Gottfried Hensel (1687–1765) was a German linguist, working in comparative linguistics.

He worked as rector in Hirschberg (Jelenia Góra), Lower Silesia.

Hensel is best known for his work Synopsis Universae Philologiae.
