= Alois Walde =

Austrian linguist (1869–1924)

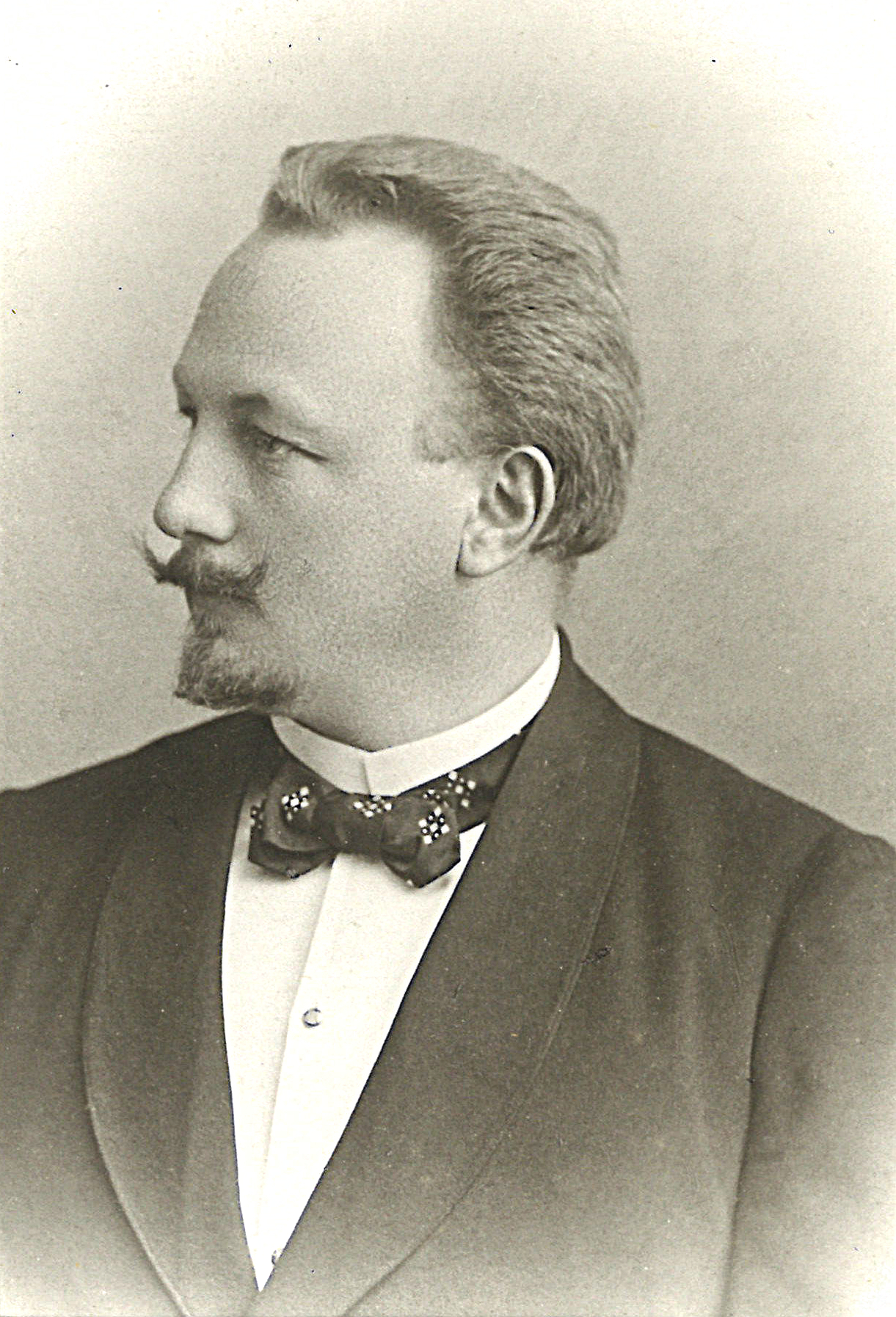
Alois Walde (1902)

Alois Walde (November 30, 1869 – October 3, 1924) was an Austrian linguist.

Alois Walde studied classical philology and comparative linguistics at the University of Innsbruck where he was awarded a PhD in 1894. The year after, he became a state employee at the university library. In 1895, he was awarded his habilitation and became a professor in 1904 at the University of Innsbruck. 1909-1912, Walde was Professor of comparative linguistics at the University of Giessen, but returned in 1912 to Innsbruck where he became the dean of faculty in 1914 and rector of the university in 1916. The year after, he became a corresponding member of the Austrian Academy of Sciences. In 1922, he took up a professorship at Albertina University Königsberg. In the same year, Walde accepted a professorship at Breslau University for 1924, but he died before he could take the new position.

Walde contributed widely to the research on laryngeal theory and Indo-European lexis. His multi-volume etymological dictionaries of Latin and Proto-Indo-European were printed in many editions, and are still in print today.

== Selected academic works ==
- Alois Walde. Lateinisches etymologisches Wörterbuch (= Indogermanische Bibliothek. Abteilung 1: Sammlung indogermanischer Lehr- und Handbücher. Reihe 2: Wörterbücher, 1). Heidelberg: Winter University Press, 1906 (3rd revised and expanded edition by Johann Baptist Hofmann 1938–1954; 6th reprint edition 2007-8. 2 volumes. ISBN 978-3-533-00668-8 (vol. 1: A – L), ISBN 978-3-8253-0669-4 (vol. 2: M – Z)).
- Alois Walde. Vergleichendes Wörterbuch der indogermanischen Sprachen. 3 vols. Edited by Julius Pokorny. Berlin: de Gruyter, 1927–1932 (reprint 1973, ISBN 3-11-004556-7).
