= Synopsis Universae Philologiae =

Early work on comparative linguistics

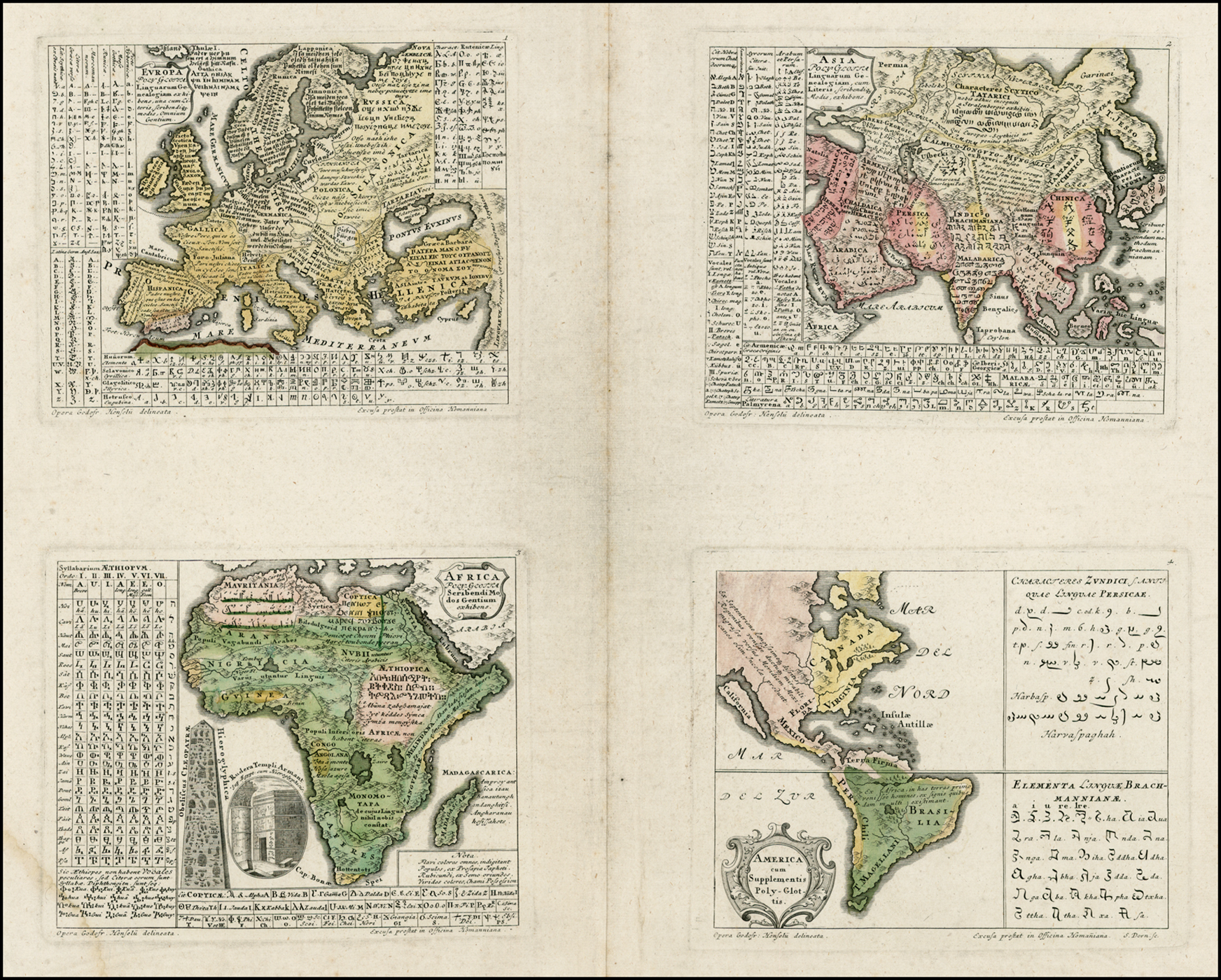
The four mappae geographico-polyglottae give the beginning of the pater noster in various languages and scripts.

Synopsis Universae Philologiae is an early work on comparative linguistics by Gottfried Hensel (Godofredus Henselius; 1687–1767), a rector in Hirschberg (Jelenia Góra), Lower Silesia. Its full title reads: Synopsis universae philologiae: in qua: miranda unitas et harmonia linguarum totius orbis terrarum occulta, e literarum, syllabarum, vocumque natura & recessibus eruitur. Cum Grammatica, LL. Orient. Harmonica, Synoptice tractata; nec non descriptione Orbis Terr. quoad Linguarum situm & propagationem, mappisque geographico-polyglottis. It was published in 1741 in Nuremberg by commission of the Homann heirs company. A second edition appeared in 1754.

== Influence of the Tower of Babel myth ==
The book proposes to present all the world's languages known at the time together with their various writing systems. As was common at the time due to the enduring Tower of Babel myth, Hensel attempted to derive all languages from a common origin in Hebrew, following A philosophicall essay for the reunion of the languages, or, the art of knowing all by the mastery of one (1675) by Pierre Besnier (1648–1705).
