= Dreimorengesetz =

Linguistic rule for placing the accent in a Germanic text

Dreimorengesetz (German: [dʁaɪˈmoːʁən.ɡəˌzɛts]; 'three-mora law') is a linguistic rule proposed by German philologist Hermann Hirt. According to the rule, an enclitic cannot be more than three morae in length. That is, three shorts, a long and a short, or a short and a long. Within a single word the most that can follow the accent is a long and a short.

== Latin ==
There is a similar rule for a Latin word, the penultimate rule:

With few exceptions, Latin hyperdisyllabic words are stressed on the penult (second-to-last syllable) if it is "heavy" (having a long vowel or diphthong or ending in a consonant), and on the antepenult (third-to-last syllable) if the penult is "light" (ending with a short vowel).

Examples:

1. Conditum "founded" = co•n—di—tum (heavy, light, final) = cónditum
2. Condītum "seasoned" = co•n—di•i—tum (heavy, heavy, final) = condítum
3. Conductum "brought together" = co•n—du•c—tum (heavy, heavy, final) =condúctum

(— marks a syllable boundary, • marks a mora boundary)

=== Moraic analysis of Latin ===
If one counts all "light" syllables as one mora and all "heavy" syllables as two morae, it becomes clear that the accent is essentially always placed three morae before the end of the word. Note, however, that for this analysis to work, one must always count the final syllable as one mora, regardless of its actual syllabic composition.

Examples:

1. In condĭtum the third mora from the end is the n of the first syllable, so the accent falls on cón-
2. In condītum the third mora from the end is the first part of the ī in the second syllable, so the accent falls on dí-
3. In conductum the third mora from the end is the du of the second syllable, so the accent falls on duc-

5th mora	4th mora	3rd mora	2nd mora	final	accent
	co	ń	di	tum	= cónditum
co	n	dí	i	tum	= condítum
co	n	dú	c	tum	= condúctum

A somewhat different, and possibly more accurate, analysis is to consider the final syllable as extra metric; then the accent always falls on the syllable with the penult metric mora, and there is no need to define a special type of mora counting for the last syllable.

== Other languages ==
Many other languages have similar but not identical rules for the placement of the accent:

- Arabic dialects (and certain other Semitic languages) originally used a similar rule, but this has been complicated by the loss of most final vowels.
- Sanskrit (and certain other Indo-Aryan languages) use a version of this rule that allowed for placement on the fourth-to-last syllable if the antepenult was light.
- Ancient Greek had a totally different rule, but it likewise restricted the accent to the last three syllables and could be seen as mora-based.
- In Japanese, the pitch accent of the standard Tokyo dialect places the accent on the antepenultimate mora by default in loanwords. This has been argued to be the result of an underlying preference in Japanese for antepenultimate mora accentuation, with the exception of a certain phonological configuration (four-mora words ending in a sequence of light syllables and a non-epenthetic vowel) which loanwords are particularly unlikely to satisfy.
