= Nasal infix =

Proto-Indo-European affix

The nasal infix is a reconstructed nasal consonant or syllable *⟨n(é)⟩ that was inserted (infixed) into the stem or root of a word in the Proto-Indo-European language. It has reflexes in several ancient and modern Indo-European languages. It is one of the affixes that mark the present tense.

== Proto-Indo-European ==
In the Proto-Indo-European language (PIE), the nasal infix *⟨n(é)⟩ is one of several means to form the athematic present tense. It is inserted immediately before the last consonant of the zero-grade root. The infix appeared as *⟨né⟩ in the forms where a full-grade stem would be expected, and as *⟨n⟩ in forms where zero-grade would be expected. For example, the PIE root *weik- "to win" would yield a nasal-infixed present stem *wi⟨né⟩k- ~ *wi⟨n⟩k-. Most reconstructable PIE nasal-infix presents belong to roots with at least one non-initial resonant and a root-final stop or laryngeal, such as *pleh₁- ("to fill") or *kʷreyh₂- ("to buy").

Since the linguistic ancestor of PIE is not known, there can only be speculations about the origins of the nasal infix. It has been suggested that it arose from a suffix (also related to *-neH- and *-neu-) which underwent metathesis. The *-néwti suffix might have emerged from the reanalysis of nasal-infix presents formed to roots ending in a glide, such as *ḱl̥néwti, which belongs to the root *ḱlew-. Another theory suggests that it perhaps emerged from the reanalysis of the nasal-infix when added to *-us adjectives. One possible piece of evidence for this theory is the pair of tepnuzzi ("to diminish") and dabhnóti ("to harm"), both of which may reflect *dʰbʰ-néw-ti, beside the base adjective tepuš ("little, few"), which may continue earlier *dʰébʰ-u-s. However, the Hittite verb is quite possibly secondary and there is otherwise little evidence for a special relationship between u-stem adjectives and nu-infix presents.

=== Semantics ===
Throughout the non-Anatolian branches of the Indo-European family, nasal-infix presents are often associated with root aorists. In PIE, these presents at least had a strongly imperfective value, as indicated by the fact that nowhere is this suffix evolved into aoristic formation. The suffix may have originally expressed transitive-factitive semantics, perhaps with a durative aspect. In Hittite, for instance, the nasal infix serves to secondarily derive transitive verbs, such as ḫar-ni(n)-k– ("to kill"), from the base ḫarakzi ("to die"). Furthermore, Hittite utilized the related *-néwti suffix to form causatives, such as linganuzi ("to make swear"), which derives from likzi ("to swear"). Likewise, Ancient Greek verbs such as οἰδάνω ("oidánō," "to inflate") beside οἰδέω ("oidéō," "to swell") perhaps showcase such continuative semantics. The majority of causative nasal infix presents throughout the Indo-European languages look inherited, because usually their roots are widespread, well-attested, and often produce nasal presents in multiple daughter languages. Thus, the connection between causative semantics and the nasal infix appears to date back to a shared ancestral stage of the Indo-European family.

However, there are some intransitive nasal presents. For instance, Ancient Greek ἱκάνω ("hikánō," "to reach") and τυγχάνω ("tunkhánō," "to succeed, hit a goal") both are intransitive, though they each have implied objects, potentially motivating later reinterpretation as telic verbs and consequently the acquisition of nasal morphology. Other intransitive nasal-presents still seem to contain traces of factitive semantics, such as Latin fungor ("to enjoy") or Ancient Greek ἁμαρτάνω ("hamartánō," "to make errors"). Moreover, the linguist Roland Pooth suggests that there are certain examples of anticausative nasal presents, such as *bʰuné-dʰti ("to be awakening"), whence πυνθάνομαι ("punthánomai," "to learn") and Old Irish asboind ("to refuse"). Pooth suggests that the suffix was probably generically imperfective, which naturally lent itself to factitive semantics in some circumstances.

According to linguist Jeremy Rau, the example of verbs such as πυνθάνομαι ("punthánomai"), ἁμαρτάνω ("hamartánō"), and τυγχάνω ("tunkhánō")—alongside other terms such as λανθάνω ("lanthánō," "to hide") and ὀλισθάνω ("olisthánō," "to slip")—are comparable to a particular type of thematic nasal-present class that he argues is present in the Balto-Slavic and Germanic branches. In these North Indo-European branches, the suffix could supposedly form inchoatives to durative verbs, as demonstrated by forms such as Lithuanian mi̇̀gti ("to fall sleep") beside miegóti ("to sleep"). Moreover, it could also form anticausatives to causative verbs, such as Gothic usbruknan ("to be broken off") beside brikan ("to break"). This particular pattern is common in Germanic and Baltic, but absent rare in Slavic, probably due to the secondary loss of this function for the suffix. The suffix could also produce denominatives to adjectives and—more rarely—nouns. This function is also most widely attested in Germanic and Baltic, appearing more rarely in Slavic, though some examples do exist, such as Old East Slavic glŭxnǫti ("to become deaf") beside gluxyi ("deaf"). On the basis of such evidence, Rau reconstructs a class of thematic nasal infix presents for Late Nuclear Indo-European, which is supposedly exemplified by forms such as Ancient Greek θάλλω ("thállō," "to flourish") and Albanian dal ("to exit"), both of which—according to Rau—may continue earlier dʰl̥nh₁-o/e-. However, the nasal infix types of the Germanic fourth weak class and the nasal infix presents of Slavic are usually recognized as continuing different PIE formations: The Germanic forms most likely continue PIE *-néh₂- ~ *-nh₂-, itself from the addition of a nasal-infix to laryngeal final roots, which also produced from such as Sanskrit gṛbhṇā́ti ("to seize," from PIE *gʰr̥bnéh₂ti), and the Slavic *-nǫti suffix probably reflects PIE *-néwti.

=== Examples ===
This table shows some examples of PIE root aorists (without an infix), their infixed present forms and the reflexes (corresponding forms) in an attested daughter language.

PIE		Reflexes in daughter languages (3rd person singular)			
Aorist	Present	Language	Aorist/perfect^{†}	Present	Translation (present)
*y(e)ug-	*yu⟨n(e)⟩g-	Sanskrit	á·yuj·at	yu·ná·k·ti	joins
*ǵʰ(e)ud-	*ǵʰu⟨n(e)⟩d-	Latin	fūdit	fundit	pours
*l(e)ikʷ-	*li⟨n(e)⟩kʷ-	Latin	līquit Latin pronunciation: [[ˈliːkʷit]]	linquit Latin pronunciation: [[ˈliŋkʷit]]	leaves, quits
*sl(e)h₂gʷ-	*slh₂⟨n(e)⟩gʷ- (?^{‡})	Ancient Greek	ἔ-λαβε (é-labe)	λαμβάνει (lambánei)	takes

^{†}The Latin reflexes of the PIE aorist came to be used as the perfect.

^{‡}It is uncertain whether *sleh₂gʷ- had a nasal infix already in PIE, since Greek λαμβάνω is only attested after Homer.

== Indo-European languages ==
The effects of the nasal infix can be seen in Indo-European languages like Sanskrit, Latin, Lithuanian, Armenian, Ancient Greek, the Goidelic languages, the Germanic Languages, and the Slavic languages.

In Latin, Ancient Greek and other daughter languages, the *n was assimilated to m before labial consonants (b, p), and to ŋ, spelled n in Latin and γ in Ancient Greek, before velar consonants (g, k, qu). Latin rūpit "has broken" / rumpit "breaks", from *rup- / *ru⟨n⟩p-, is an example of the first case.

=== Indo-Aryan ===
The phenomenon of nasal-infixing as inherited from Proto-Indo-European is found in Sanskrit with the greatest morphological transparency, and is taken as a guide to examining the feature in kindred languages.

Three of the ten classes identified by traditional Sanskrit grammarians have nasal infix of some kind, which are higher-grade and accent-bearing in the strong forms, and reduced-grade in the weak forms. The behaviour (Note: 3rd-person singular and plural) of the class-7 root √yuj- (Note: 'join') class-5 √śru- (Note: 'hear') and class-9 krī- (Note: 'buy') can be seen thus:

- yu·ná·k·ti ↔ yu·ñj·ánti (-na- vs -n-)
- śṛ·ṇó·ti ↔ śṛ·ṇv·ánti (-no- vs -nu-)
- krī·ṇā́·ti ↔ krī·ṇ·ánti (-nā- vs -n-)

While these were seen as 3 separate classes by the ancient Sanskrit grammarians, Ferdinand Saussure demonstrated, as part of his landmark work in postulating the Laryngeal theory, that these were slightly different manifestations of the same nasal infix.

=== Greek ===
Greek has some verbs that show a nasal infix in the present as opposed to other forms of the verb:

- λαμβάνω (lambánō "to take, receive, get") against aorist ἔλᾰβον (élabon)
- λανθάνω (lanthánō "to escape notice, cause to forget") against alternative λήθω (lḗthō; compare lḗthē and alḗtheia)
- τυγχάνω (tynkhánō "to happen to do sth., to succeed") against aorist ἔτυχον (étykhon)

=== Latin ===
Latin has a number of verbs with an n in the present stem which is missing in the perfect stem:

- vīcit "has won" / vi**n**cit "wins" (from the PIE verb above)
- contudit "has crushed" / contu**n**dit "crushes"
- scidit "has cut" / sci**n**dit "cuts"

==== Latin loanwords ====
English and the other Germanic languages show only vestiges of the nasal infix. The only certain remaining example is English stand, with the past tense stood lacking the n. However, it can still be seen in some pairs of Latin loanwords:

- confuse – confou**n**d (Latin confundō)
- impact – impi**n**ge (Latin impingō, from in- + pangō)
- conviction – convi**n**ce (Latin con-vincō)

=== Celtic ===
In Celtic, the Indo-European nasal infix presents split into two categories: ones originally derived from laryngeal-final roots (i.e. seṭ roots in Sanskrit), and ones that were not (i.e. from aniṭ roots). In seṭ verbs, the nasal appears at the end of the present stem, while in aniṭ-derived verbs the nasal was followed by a root-final stop (generally -g- in Old Irish). The nasal presents are readily apparent in Old Irish, where the nasal infix is not present outside of the present stem, like in other old Indo-European languages.

Old Irish nasal-infix present verbs (nasal infixes in bold)
Meaning	Root type	Present	Preterite	Future	Subjunctive
"to support"	aniṭ	fo·loi**n**g (independent) ·fulai**n**g (dependent)	fo·lolaig	fo·lil	fo·ló
"to buy"	seṭ	cre**n**aid (independent) ·cre**n** (dependent)	cíuir	*-cíuri	-cria

The seṭ nasal presents' final nasal, ultimately from the nasal infix, was generalized to become suffixed onto all verbs in modern Irish as the present analytic suffix -(e)ann, remaining productive into modern times.

=== Slavic languages ===
Only vestiges are left, like Russian лечь (*legti [root "leg"]) (to lie down) : лягу (*lęgǫ) (I will lie down), сесть (*sĕsti [root sĕd]) (to sit down) : сяду (*sędǫ) (I will sit down) (both e:en).

== Tolkien ==
In J. R. R. Tolkien's constructed languages Quenya and Sindarin spoken by the Elves, the nasal infix forms the past tense of many verbs. These are most clear in Quenya which shows the nasal infix in the past-tense forms ending in any consonant besides -m, -n, or -r. Thus, cen- "to see" has the past tense cen-në, but mat- "to eat" has not *mat-në but the metathesised ma(n)t-ë. The infix is more obscured in related Sindarin due to further sound changes but can be observed in verbs such as pedi "to speak" has the form pennin "I spoke" which shows the nasal infix (in bold) and the -d- of pedi and assimilated to -n- following the infix.

== Sources ==
- Baldi, Philip (22 January 1999). The Foundations of Latin. Trends in Linguistics. Mouton de Gruyter. ISBN 3-11-016294-6.
- Bertocci, Davide (2016), "High transitivity nasal presents between lexical etymology and morphology", in Hansen, Bjarne Simmelkjær Sandgaard; Whitehead, Benedicte Nielsen; Olander, Thomas; Olsen, Birgit Anette (eds.), Etymology and the European Lexicon, Proceedings of the 14th Fachtagung of the Indogermanische Gesellschaft Copenhagen, Wiesbaden, ISBN 978-3-95490-202-6
- Burrow, T (2001). The Sanskrit Language (2001 ed.). Motilal Banarsidass. ISBN 81-208-1767-2.
- Fauskanger, Helge Kåre (February 2003). "lesson 6". Quenya Course.
- Fortson, Benjamin W. IV (2004). Indo-European Language and Culture. Blackwell Publishing. ISBN 1-4051-0316-7.
- Fortson, Benjamin W (2010). Indo-European Language and Culture (2010 ed.). Wiley-Blackwell. ISBN 978-1-4051-8895-1.
- Hamp, Eric (1975). "On the nasal presents of Armenian". Zeitschrift für vergleichende Sprachforschung. 89 (1): 100–109.
- Smyth, Herbert Weir (1920). A Greek Grammar for Colleges – via Perseus Project.
- Lundquist, Jesse; Yates, Anthony D. (11 June 2018), "122. The morphology of Proto-Indo-European", in Klein, Jared; Joseph, Brian; Fritz, Matthias (eds.), Volume 3 Handbook of Comparative and Historical Indo-European Linguistics, De Gruyter Mouton, pp. 2079–2195, doi:10.1515/9783110542431-043/html, ISBN 978-3-11-054243-1
- McCone, Kim (1991). The Indo-European Origins of the Old Irish Nasal Presents, Subjunctives and Futures. Innsbrucker Beiträge zur Sprachwissenschaft. IBS-Vertrieb. ISBN 978-3-85124-617-9.
- McCone, Kim (1997). The Early Irish Verb. Maynooth Monographs 1 (2nd ed.). Maynooth: An Sagart. ISBN 1-870684-76-1.
- Milizia, Paolo (2004). "Proto-Indo-European Nasal Infixation Rule". Journal of Indo-European Studies. 32 (3&4): 337–359.
- Petschenig, Michael (1971). Der kleine Stowasser (in German). Vienna: Oldenbourg Schulbuchverlag.
- Pooth, Roland (11 March 2016). "Proto-Indo-European Verb Morphology. Part 1. Inflection". Language Arts.
- Rau, Jeremy (23 September 2025). "A Late Nuclear Proto-Indo-European verbal type: Intransitive thematic nasal-infix present actives". In Grestenberger, Laura; Reiter, Viktoria; Malzahn, Melanie; Boldt, Ramón; Höfler, Stefan; Stifter, David; Sasseville, David; Svensson, Miguel Villanueva; Garnier, Romain (eds.). Deadjectival verb formation in Indo-European and beyond. Language Science Press. ISBN 978-3-96110-564-9.
- Rix, Helmut (2001). Lexikon der indogermanischen Verben (in German). Dr. Ludwig Reichert Verlag. ISBN 3-89500-219-4.
- Reformatskij, A (1996). Введение в языкознание [An introduction to linguistics] (in Russian). Moscow.
- Ringe, Don (2006). From Proto-Indo-European to Proto-Germanic (PDF). A Linguistic History of English (1st ed.). New York City: Oxford University Press. ISBN 978-0-19-928413-9. OCLC 64554645. OL 7405151M. Wikidata Q131605459.
- Schäfer, Karl-Heinz; Zimmermann, Bernhard (1990). Taschenwörterbuch Altgriechisch (in German) (3 ed.). Munich: Langenscheidt. ISBN 3-468-10031-0.
- Shatskov, Andrey (2020), "Hittite causative markers in a diachronic Anatolian perspective", Journal of Language Relationship, vol. 18, no. 3–4, p. 277, doi:10.31826/jlr-2020-183-411, ISSN 2219-4029
- Sihler, Andrew L. (1995), New Comparative Grammar of Greek and Latin, Oxford University Press, ISBN 0-19-508345-8
- Svensson, Miguel Villanueva (2011). "Anticausative-inchoative verbs in the northern Indo-European languages". Historische Sprachforschung / Historical Linguistics. 124: 33–58. ISSN 0935-3518.
- Szemerényi, Oswald JL (1996). Introduction to Indo-European Linguistics. Great Britain: Clarendon Oxford. ISBN 0-19-824015-5.
- Weiss, Michael (2010), "Morphology and Word Formation", A Companion to the Ancient Greek Language, John Wiley & Sons, Ltd, pp. 104–119, doi:10.1002/9781444317398.ch8?msockid=2016608308e2696028ec76f40912682d, ISBN 978-1-4443-1739-8
- Whitney, William Dwight (January 2008). Sanskrit Grammar (2000 ed.). Motilal Banarsidass. ISBN 978-81-208-0620-7.
- Witczak, Krzysztof Tomasz (30 December 2020). "GREEK DURATIVE VERBS WITH THE NASAL INFIX AND SUFFIX". FLUMINENSIA : časopis za filološka istraživanja. 32 (2): 85–97. doi:10.31820/f.32.2.9. ISSN 0353-4642.
