= Mora (linguistics) =

Theoretical smallest unit of timing

In linguistics, a mora (pl. morae or moras; often symbolized μ) is the smallest unit of timing, equal to or shorter than a syllable, which theoretically or perceptually exists in some spoken languages in which phonetic length (such as vowel length) matters significantly. For example, in the Japanese language, the name of the city Ōsaka (おおさか) consists of three syllables (O-sa-ka) but four morae (O-o-sa-ka), since the first syllable, Ō, is pronounced with a long vowel (the others being short). Thus, a short vowel contains one mora and is called monomoraic, while a long vowel contains two and is called bimoraic. Extra-long syllables with three morae (trimoraic) are relatively rare. Such metrics based on syllables are also referred to as syllable weight. In Japanese, certain consonants also stand on their own as individual morae and thus are monomoraic.

The term comes from the Latin word for 'linger, delay', which was also used to translate the Greek word χρόνος : chrónos ('time') in its metrical sense.

== Formation ==
The general principles for assigning moras to segments are as follows (see Hayes 1989 and Hyman 1985 for detailed discussion):

1. A syllable onset (the first consonant or consonants of the syllable) does not represent any mora.
2. The syllable nucleus represents one mora in the case of a short vowel, and two morae in the case of a long vowel or diphthong. Consonants serving as syllable nuclei also represent one mora if short and two if long. Slovak is an example of a language that has both long and short consonantal nuclei.
3. In some languages (for example, Latin and Japanese), the coda represents one mora, and in others (for example, Irish) it does not.
4. In some languages, a syllable with a long vowel or diphthong in the nucleus and one or more consonants in the coda is said to be trimoraic (syllables exhibiting pluti in Sanskrit).

In general, monomoraic syllables are called "light syllables", bimoraic syllables are called "heavy syllables", and trimoraic syllables (in languages that have them) are called "superheavy syllables". Some languages, such as Old English and potentially present-day English, can have syllables with up to four morae.

A prosodic stress system in which moraically heavy syllables are assigned stress is said to have the property of quantity sensitivity.

== Languages ==
=== Ancient Greek ===
For the purpose of determining accent in Ancient Greek, short vowels have one mora, and long vowels and diphthongs have two morae. Thus long ē (eta: η) can be understood as a sequence of two short vowels: ee.

Ancient Greek pitch accent is placed on only one mora in a word. An acute (έ, ή) represents high pitch on the only mora of a short vowel or the last mora of a long vowel (é, eé). A circumflex (ῆ) represents high pitch on the first mora of a long vowel (ée).

=== Gilbertese ===
Gilbertese, an Austronesian language spoken mainly in Kiribati, is a trimoraic language. The typical foot in Gilbertese contains three morae. These trimoraic constituents are units of stress in Gilbertese. These "ternary metrical constituents of the sort found in Gilbertese are quite rare cross-linguistically, and as far as we know, Gilbertese is the only language in the world reported to have a ternary constraint on prosodic word size."

=== Hawaiian ===
In Hawaiian, both syllables and morae are important. Stress falls on the penultimate mora, though in words long enough to have two stresses, only the final stress is predictable. However, although a diphthong, such as oi, consists of two morae, stress may fall only on the first, a restriction not found with other vowel sequences such as io. That is, there is a distinction between oi, a bimoraic syllable, and io, which is two syllables.

=== Japanese ===
Most dialects of Japanese, including the standard, use morae, known in Japanese as haku (拍) or mōra (モーラ), rather than syllables, as the basis of the sound system. Writing Japanese in kana (hiragana and katakana) demonstrates a moraic system of writing. For example, in the two-syllable word mōra, the ō is a long vowel and counts as two morae. The word is written in three symbols, モーラ, corresponding here to mo-o-ra, each containing one mora. Therefore, the 5/7/5 pattern of the haiku in modern Japanese is of morae rather than syllables.

The Japanese syllable-final n is also moraic, as is the first part of a geminate consonant. For example, the Japanese name for Japan, 日本, has two different pronunciations, one with three morae (Nihon) and one with four (Nippon). In the hiragana spelling, the three morae of Ni-ho-n are represented by three characters (にほん), and the four morae of Ni-p-po-n need four characters to be written out as にっぽん. The latter can also be analysed as Ni-Q-po-n, with the Q representing a full mora of silence. In this analysis, っ (the sokuon) indicates a one-mora period of silence.

Similarly, the names Tōkyō (To-u-kyo-u, とうきょう), Ōsaka (O-o-sa-ka, おおさか), and Nagasaki (Na-ga-sa-ki, ながさき) all have four morae, even though, on this analysis, they have two, three and four syllables, respectively. The number of morae in a word is not always equal to the number of graphemes when written in kana; for example, even though it has four morae, the Japanese name for Tōkyō (とうきょう) is written with five graphemes, because one of these graphemes (ょ) represents a yōon, a feature of the Japanese writing system that indicates that the preceding consonant is palatalized.

The "contracted sound" (拗音) is represented by the three small kana for ya (ゃ), yu (ゅ), yo (ょ). These do not represent a mora by themselves and attach to other kana; all the rest of the graphemes represent a mōra on their own.

Most dialects of Japanese are pitch accent languages, and these pitch accents are also based on morae.

There is a unique set of mōra known as "special mora" (特殊拍) which cannot be pronounced by itself but still counts as one mora whenever present. These consist of "nasal sound" (撥音) represented by the kana for n (ん), the "geminate consonant" (促音) represented by the small tsu (っ), the "long sound" (長音) represented by the long vowel symbol (ー) or a single vowel which extends the sound of the previous mōra (びょ「う」いん) and the "diphthong" (二重母音) represented by the second vowel of two consecutive vowels (ばあ「い」).

This set also has the peculiarity that – barring only a couple of extreme examples, namely コーン茶 and チェーン店 – the drop in pitch of a word (so-called "downstep") cannot come after any of these "special morae", a useful tidbit for language learners trying to learn word pitch accents.

=== Luganda ===
In Luganda, a short vowel constitutes one mora while a long vowel constitutes two morae. A simple consonant has no morae, and a doubled or prenasalised consonant has one. No syllable may contain more than three morae. The tone system in Luganda is based on morae. See Luganda tones and Luganda grammar.

=== Old English ===
In Old English, short diphthongs and monophthongs were monomoraic, long diphthongs and monophthongs were bimoraic, consonants ending a syllable were each one mora, and geminate consonants added a mora to the preceding syllable. If Modern English is analyzed in terms of morae at all, which is contentious, the rules would be similar, except that all diphthongs would be considered bimoraic. Probably in Old English, like in Modern English, syllables could not have more than four morae, with loss of sounds occurring if a syllable would have more than four otherwise. In the Old English period, all content words (as well as stressed monosyllables) had to be at least two morae long.

=== Indo-Aryan ===
==== Sanskrit ====
In Sanskrit, the mora is expressed as the mātrā. For example, the short vowel a (pronounced like a schwa) is assigned a value of one mātrā, the long vowel ā is assigned a value of two mātrās, and the compound vowel (diphthong) ai (which has either two simple short vowels, a+i, or one long and one short vowel, ā+i) is assigned a value of two mātrās. In addition, there is pluta (trimoraic) and dīrgha pluta ('long pluta' = quadrimoraic).

Sanskrit prosody and metrics have a deep history of taking into account moraic weight, as it were, rather than straight syllables, divided into laghu (लघु, 'light') and dīrgha/guru (दीर्घ/गुरु, 'heavy') feet based on how many morae can be isolated in each word. Thus, for example, the word kartṛ (कर्तृ), meaning 'agent' or 'doer', does not contain simply two syllabic units, but contains rather, in order, a dīrgha/guru foot and a laghu foot. The reason is that the conjoined consonants rt render the normally light ka syllable heavy.

==== Prakrit ====
Unlike Sanskrit, Prakrit only allows syllables with one or two morae, due to its adoption of a pure vowel system. Light syllables of one mora contain a short vowel, while heavy syllables of two morae contain a heavy vowel and no coda, or a short vowel and a coda which usually matches the onset of the following syllable; onsets are optional, except wherever gemination occurs, and do not change the number of morae.

The transformation of Prakrit's isochrony to mora timing, away from the syllable timing of Sanskrit, is likely a consequence of significant phonological influence from an older Dravidian language.

The moraic āryā or gāthā metre originated in Prakrit and was later introduced to Sanskrit, which generally employed syllabic metres.

== See also ==
- Chroneme
- Compensatory lengthening
- Dreimorengesetz
- On (Japanese prosody)
- Pitch accent
- Syllable
- Morpheme
