= Melanie Malzahn =

German linguist (born 1973)

- Born: 1973 (age 52–53)
- Occupations: linguist, Indo-Europeanist

Melanie Malzahn (born 1973 in Hamburg) is a German professor of Indo-European studies at the University of Vienna specializing in the history of the Tocharian languages.

== Biography ==
Between 1992 and 1999, Malzahn studied linguistics and Ancient Near East studies in Hamburg and Vienna, receiving her magister degree from the University of Vienna in 1999 and her doctorate from the same institution in 2001; the topic of her dissertation was sandhi in the Rigveda. Between 2000 and 2012 she held various positions at the University of Vienna, as well as spending time as a guest researcher at the Institut de France, UCLA, and Harvard University. In 2009 she received her habilitation in Indo-European linguistics for a book on the Tocharian verbal system. In 2012 she was appointed to the professorship of comparative Indo-European linguistics at the University of Vienna.

== Honours and awards ==
Malzahn is an elected member of several prestigious scholarly associations. In 2013 she was elected as a corresponding member of the Austrian Academy of Sciences, and since 2015 she has been a full member. In 2014 she was elected member of the Academia Europaea. Since 2020 she has been a corresponding member of the Saxon Academy of Sciences and Humanities in Leipzig.

== Research ==
Alongside the Tocharian languages, Malzahn has published broadly across comparative Indo-European studies, including work on Vedic Sanskrit, Ancient Greek, Old Irish, early Germanic, and Etruscan.

Her 2010 monograph on the Tocharian verbal system, based on her habilitation thesis and running to over a thousand pages, has been praised as a magnum opus that is likely to be the standard reference work on its subject matter for many years to come.

== Selected publications ==
- Malzahn, Melanie. 1999. Die nominalen Flexionsendungen des idg. Duals (The nominal inflectional endings of the Indo-European dual). Historische Sprachforschung/Historical Linguistics 112 (2), 204–226.
- Malzahn, Melanie. 2010. The Tocharian verbal system. Leiden: Brill.
- Malzahn, Melanie. 2011. Speaking on tongue: the Tocharian B nouns with an oblique singular in -a. Tocharian and Indo-European Studies 12, 83–109.
- Malzahn, Melanie. 2012. Position matters: The placement of clitics in metrical texts of Tocharian B. Tocharian and Indo-European Studies 13, 163–162.
