= Wilhelm Streitberg =

German linguist (1864–1925)

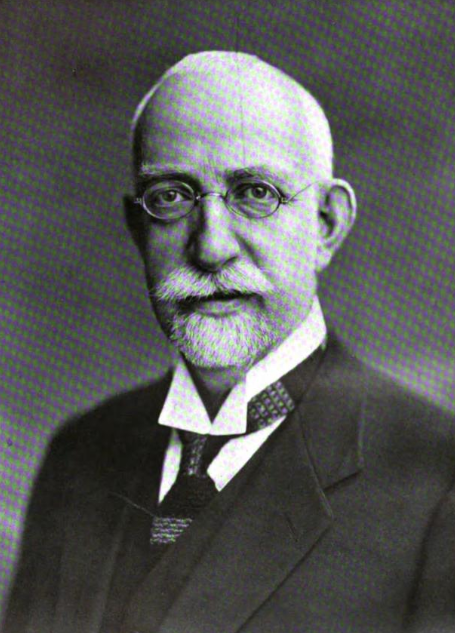
- Streitberg's portrait in a 1924 Festgabe in honor of his 60th birthday
- Born: 23 February 1864; Rüdesheim am Rhein, Duchy of Nassau
- Died: 19 August 1925 (aged 61); Leipzig, Weimar Republic
- Education: Münster Academy; Humboldt University of Berlin; Leipzig University
- Known for: Co-founding the Indogermanische Forschungen; Streitberg's law
- Scientific career
- Fields: linguistics, Indo-European studies
- Workplaces: Ludwig-Maximilians-Universität München; Leipzig University

Signature
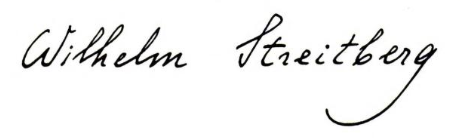

Wilhelm August Streitberg (23 February 1864 – 19 August 1925) was a German Indo-Europeanist, specializing in Germanic languages. Together with Karl Brugmann, he founded the Indogermanische Forschungen journal.

He studied Germanistics and Indo-European philology at Münster Academy and at the Humboldt University of Berlin and Leipzig University, receiving his habilitation for Indo-European linguistics at Münster Academy in 1889. In 1906, he became a full professor, and three years later relocated to the Ludwig-Maximilians-Universität München as a professor of Indo-European linguistics. In 1920, he returned to Leipzig, where he taught classes up until his death in 1925. From 1911 to 1920, he was a member of the Bavarian Academy of Sciences.

== Works ==
- 1896 Urgermanische Grammatik.
- 1897 Gotisches Elementarbuch. (2nd edition 1906, 3rd and 4th editions 1910, 5th and 6th editions 1920).
- 1908 Die gotische Bibel (as editor).
