= Lexikon der indogermanischen Partikeln und Pronominalstämme =

- Author: George E. Dunkel
- Language: German
- Subject: Proto-Indo-European particles and pronouns
- Publisher: Universitätsverlag Winter
- Publication date: July 2014
- Publication place: Germany
- Pages: 1250
- ISBN: 978-3-8253-5926-3

The Lexikon der indogermanischen Partikeln und Pronominalstämme (LIPP, "Lexicon of the Indo-European Particles and Pronominal Stems") is an etymological dictionary of the Proto-Indo-European (PIE) particles and pronouns, published in 2014. It consists of two volumes; number 1 containing an introduction, terminology, sound laws, adverbial endings, nominal suffixes, appendices, and indices, and number 2 containing the lexicon.

== Reviews ==
- Joseph, Brian D. (2016). "Lexikon der indogermanischen Partikeln und Pronominalstämme. Band 1: Einleitung, Terminologie, Lautgesetze, Adverbialendungen, Nominalsuffixe, Anhänge und Indices. Band 2: Lexikon". Diachronica. 33 (4): 538–542. doi:10.1075/dia.33.4.05jos.
- Dupraz, Emmanuel (2019). "Dunkel, G. E. (éd.): Lexikon der indogermanischen Partikeln und Pronominalstämme". Zeitschrift für celtische Philologie. 66. Berlin: De Gruyter: 213–214. doi:10.1515/zcph-2019-0009. hdl:2013/ULB-DIPOT:oai:dipot.ulb.ac.be:2013/303225.

== See also ==
- Proto-Indo-European particles
- Proto-Indo-European pronouns
