= Helmut Rix =

German linguist (1926–2004)

- Born: 4 July 1926; Amberg, Germany
- Died: 3 December 2004 (aged 78); Colmar, France

Academic background
- Education: University of Würzburg, University of Heidelberg

Academic work
- Discipline: Linguistics
- Sub-discipline: Tyrrhenian languages
- Institutions: University of Tübingen, Augustana Divinity School, University of Freiburg

Helmut Rix (4 July 1926, in Amberg – 3 December 2004, in Colmar) was a German linguist and professor of the Sprachwissenschaftliches Seminar of Albert-Ludwigs-Universität, Freiburg, Germany.

He is best known for his research into Indo-European and Etruscan languages, as well as for being the author of the hypothesis of Tyrrhenian languages.

== Biography ==
Helmut Rix was born in 1926 in Amberg to a family of teachers. Following high school and conscripted service in the German navy during World War II, he studied Indo-European studies, classical philology, and history at Wurzburg in 1946 and Heidelberg from 1947. There he received his doctorate in 1950 with his dissertation Bausteine zu einer Hydronymie Alt-Italiens. From 1951 he was assistant to Hans Krahe at Tübingen and from 1955 lecturer in Latin and Greek at the Lutheran Augustana Divinity School in Neuendettelsau. In 1959 he qualified as a full professor at Tübingen with the habilitation thesis, Das etruskische Cognomen (published in 1963 by Harrassowitz). In 1966, Rix took a position at the newly established University of Regensburg and in 1982 professorship at the University of Freiburg. He retired in 1993 and died in 2004 in Colmar from a traffic accident.

== Bibliography ==
=== Proto-Indo-European ===
- "Anlautender Laryngal vor Liquida oder Nasalis sonans im Griechischen", Münchener Studien zur Sprachwissenschaft 27 (1970): 79–110. [formulation of Rix's law]
- Historische Grammatik des Griechischen: Laut- und Formenlehre. Darmstadt: Wissenschaftliche Buchgesellschaft, 1976 (2nd ed., 1992).
- The Proto-Indo-European Middle: content, forms and origin. Munich: R. Kitzinger, 1988.
- Lexikon der indogermanischen Verben: Die Wurzeln und ihre Primärstammbildungen. With contributions by Martin Kümmel, Thomas Zehnder, Reiner Lipp and Brigitte Schirmer. Wiesbaden: Dr. Ludwig Reichert, 1998, 754 p.; 2nd expanded and improved ed., edited by Martin Kümmel and Helmut Rix, 2001, 823 p.
- Kleine Schriften: Festgabe für Helmut Rix zum 75. Geburtstag, ed. Gerhard Meiser. Bremen: Hempen Verlag, 2001.

=== Ancient Italian culture and language ===
- "Zum Ursprung des römisch-mittelitalischen Gentilnamensystems", in Aufstieg und Niedergang der römischen Welt: Geschichte und Kultur Roms im Spiegel der neueren Forschung (ANRW), vol. 1: Von den Anfängen Roms bis zum Ausgang der Republik. Berlin–NY: Walter de Gruyter, 1972, 700–758.
- "Die lateinische Synkope als historisches und phonologisches Problem", Kratylos 11 (1966): 156–165. Republished in: Klaus Strunk, ed., Probleme der lateinischen Grammatik. Darmstadt: Wissenschaftliche Buchgesellschaft, 1973, 90–102.
- Die Termini der Unfreiheit in den Sprachen Altitaliens. Stuttgart 1994.
- Sabellische Texte: Die Texte des Oskischen, Umbrischen und Südpikenischen. Heidelberg: Carl Winter University Press, 2002 [collection of all Sabellic (Osco-Umbrian) inscriptions].

=== Etruscan ===
- Das etruskische Cognomen: Untersuchungen zu System, Morphologie und Verwendung der Personennamen auf den jüngeren Inschriften Nordetruriens. Wiesbaden: Otto Harrassowitz, 1963, xvi + 410 p.
- "La scrittura e la lingua", in Gli Etruschi: una nuova immagine, ed. M. Cristofani. Florence: Giunti Martello, 1984, 210–238. [short Etruscan grammar]
- "Etruskisch culs ‘Tor’ und der Abschnitt VIII 1–2 des Zagreber liber linteus", Vjesnik Arheološkog Muzeja u Zagrebu, 3rd series, 19 (1986): 17–40.
- "Etrusco un, une, unuc ‘te, tibi, vos’ e le preghiere dei rituali paralleli nel liber linteus", Archeologia Classica 43 (1991): 665–691.
- Etruskische Texte, 2 vols., co-edited by Gerhard Meiser. Tübingen: G. Narr, 1991, vol. 1: 320 p., 2: 370 p.
- "Les prières du liber linteus de Zagreb", in Les Étrusques, les plus religieux des hommes, eds. Françoise Gaultier & Dominique Briquel. Paris: La Documentation française, 1997, 391–397.
- Rätisch und Etruskisch. Innsbruck: Institut für Sprachwissenschaft der Universität Innsbruck, 1998, 67 p. Innsbrucker Beiträge zur Sprachwissenschaft, Vorträge und Kleinere Schriften, No. 68.

=== Edited volumes ===
- Flexion und Wortbildung: Akten der V. Fachtagung der Indogermanischen Gesellschaft, Regensburg, 9. bis 14. September 1973. Wiesbaden: Dr. Ludwig Reichert Verlag, 1990.
- Sprachwissenschaft und Philologie. Jacob Wackernagel und die Indogermanistik heute: Kolloquium der Indogermanischen Gesellschaft vom 13. bis 15. Oktober 1988 in Basel, co-edited by Heiner Eichner. Wiesbaden: Dr. Ludwig Reichert Verlag, 1990.
- Oskisch – Umbrisch: Texte und Grammatik. Arbeitstagung der Indogermanischen Gesellschaft und der Società Italiana di Glottologia vom 25. bis 28. September 1991 in Freiburg. Wiesbaden: Dr. Ludwig Reichert Verlag, 1994.
