= Berthold Delbrück =

German linguist (1842–1922)

- Born: 26 July 1842; Putbus, Kingdom of Prussia
- Died: 3 January 1922 (aged 79); Jena, German Confederation

Berthold Gustav Gottlieb Delbrück (German pronunciation: [ˈbɛʁthɔlt ˈdɛl.bʁʏk]; 26 July 1842 – 3 January 1922) was a German linguist who devoted himself to the study of the comparative syntax of the Indo-European languages.

== Early life ==
Delbrück was born in Putbus. He studied at the universities of Halle and Berlin, receiving his doctorate at Halle in 1863. In 1870 he succeeded August Leskien as an associate professor at the University of Jena, where in 1873 he was named a full professor of Sanskrit and comparative linguistics.

== Career ==
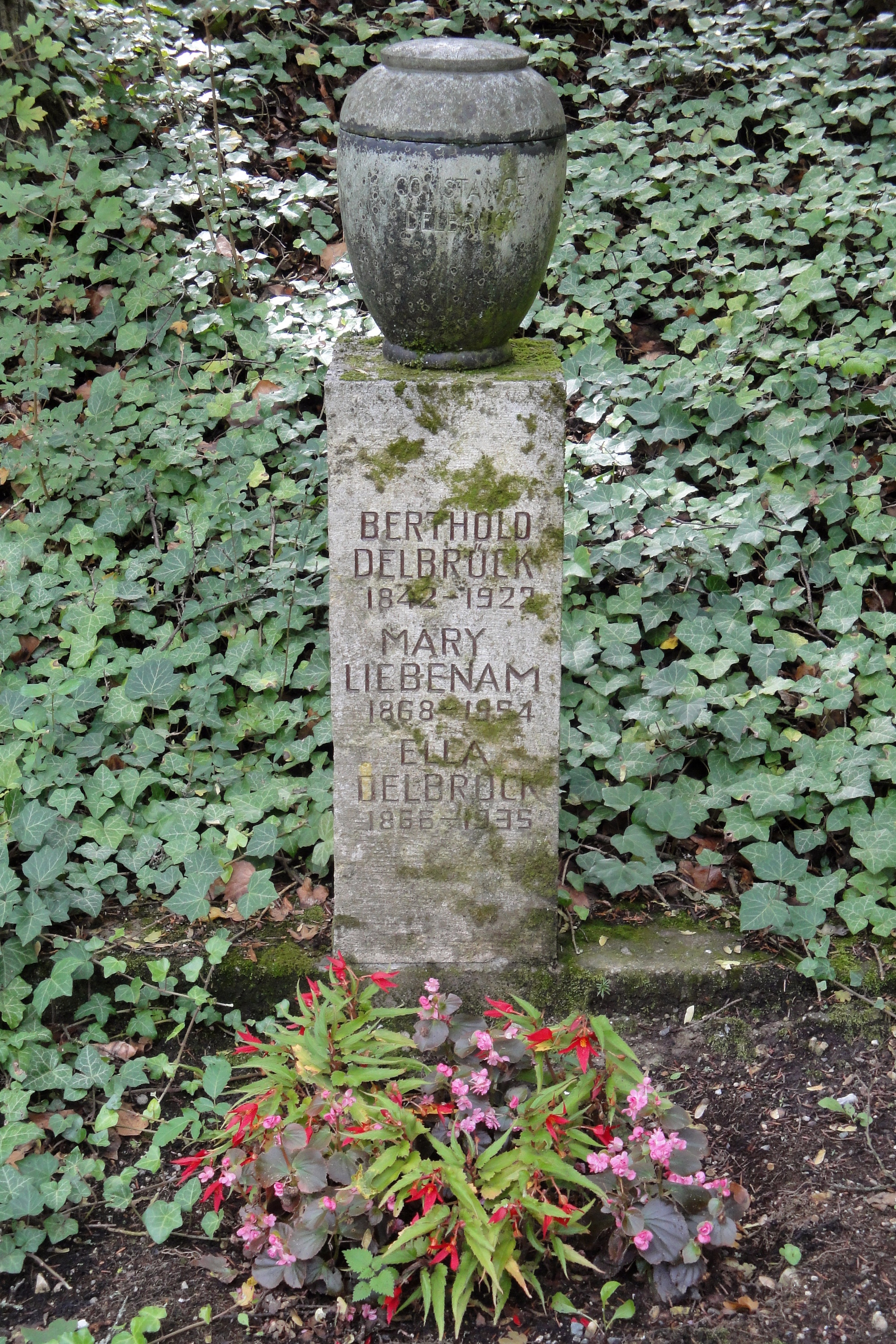
Grave at the Nordfriedhof in Jena

In 1871 he published a study of the subjunctive and optative moods in Sanskrit and Greek, which was the first thoroughly methodical and complete treatment of a problem in comparative syntax. His great achievement, however, was preparing volumes iii, iv, and v on syntax entitled Vergleichende Syntax der indogermanischen Sprachen in Grundriß der vergleichenden Grammatik der indogermanischen Sprachen ("Outline of the Comparative Grammar of the Indo-Germanic Languages"), published in Strassburg between 1893 and 1900 by Delbrück and Karl Brugmann. He died in Jena, aged 79.

== Works ==
Besides the works mentioned, he wrote:

- Grundfragen der Sprachforschung (1901).
- Einleitung in das Sprachstudium (3rd edition, 1893; English translation: Introduction to the study of language (1882).
- Syntaktische Forschungen, vols. i.–v. (1871–88); with Ernst Windisch.
