= Julius Pokorny =

Austrian-Czech linguist (1887–1970)

- Born: 12 June 1887; Prague, Austria-Hungary
- Died: 8 April 1970 (aged 82); Zürich, Switzerland

Academic background
- Education: University of Vienna

Academic work
- Institutions: University of Vienna; Humboldt University of Berlin; University of Bern; University of Zurich; LMU Munich
- Notable works: Indogermanisches etymologisches Wörterbuch

Julius Pokorny (12 June 1887 – 8 April 1970) was an Austrian-Czech linguist and scholar of the Celtic languages and of Celtic studies, particularly of the Irish language, and a supporter of Irish nationalism. He held academic posts in Austrian and German universities.

== Early life and education ==
Julius Pokorny was born on 12 June 1887 in Prague, Bohemia, under the Austro-Hungarian Empire. He was educated at the Piarist School in Prague and the Benedictine Abbey school in Kremsmünster, Austria. From 1905 until 1911, he studied at the University of Vienna, graduating in law and philology, and he taught there from 1913 to 1920.

== Career ==
During World War I, Pokorny was a pro-German activist, urging Irish republicans to launch the Easter Rising against the British Empire. He is known to have met and corresponded with Roger Casement, an activist for Irish independence who was executed in 1916. Pokorny also served in the war as a reservist in the Austro-Hungarian Army (Cisleithanian) Army starting in 1916.

In 1920, he succeeded Kuno Meyer as Chair of Celtic Philology at Friedrich Wilhelm University in Berlin. Although baptised Catholic at birth and being sympathetic to German nationalism, he was suspended in 1933 under the Nazi Law for the Restoration of the Professional Civil Service, because of his Jewish ancestry. He was reinstated later that year under the exemption for those who had worn the uniform of Germany or its allies in World War I, which had been insisted on by Weimar Republic President Paul von Hindenburg as a precondition before he signed the bill into law. In 1935, he was dismissed once again under the provisions of the racist Nuremberg Laws; which led to his replacement as the Berlin Chair for Celtic Studies by Ludwig Mühlhausen. He continued to live more or less openly in Berlin until at least 1939, but lived a shadowy and underground existence there from around 1940 until he escaped to Switzerland in 1943. He taught for a few years at the University of Bern and at the University of Zurich until his retirement in 1959.

In 1954, he received an honorary professorship at the Ludwig-Maximilians-Universität München (LMU), where he taught part-time in 1956 and again from 1960 to 1965. He was awarded honorary degrees by the National University of Ireland in 1925, University of Wales at Swansea in 1965 and Edinburgh University in 1967.

== Death ==
He died in Zürich in 1970, almost three weeks after being hit by a tram not far from his home.

== Scholarship ==
He was the editor of the journal of philological studies Zeitschrift für celtische Philologie from 1921 until forced out by the Nazis in 1939, and was responsible for reviving it in 1954. He continued to edit it until his death in 1970. He is the author of the Indogermanisches etymologisches Wörterbuch ('Indo-European Etymological Dictionary'; 1959), which was a central text in its time. He also published several collections of Irish writing in German translation, and a thoroughly Irish nationalist history of Ireland in 1916, which appeared in English translation in 1933.

Pokorny was a dedicated supporter of the Pan-Illyrian theory and located the Illyrian civilisation's Urheimat between the Weser and the Vistula and east from that region where migration began around 2400 BC. Pokorny suggested that Illyrian elements were to be found in much of continental Europe and also in Britain and Ireland. His "Illyromania" derived in part from archaeological "Germanomania" and was supported by contemporary place-names specialists such as Max Vasmer (1928, 1929) and Hans Krahe (1929, 1935, 1940).

== Works ==
Books

- Der Ursprung der Arthursage. Vienna: Anthropologische Gesellschaft, 1909.
- A Concise Old Irish Grammar and Reader. Halle an der Saale: Max Niemeyer; Dublin: Hodges/Figgis, 1914.
- Irland. Gotha: F.A. Perthes, 1916 (Perthes' kleine Völker- und Länderkunde 1).
  - English translation: A History of Ireland, trans. Séana D King. London: Longmans; NY: Green and Co., 1933.
- Die älteste Lyrik der grünen Insel. Halle: M. Niemeyer, 1923.
- A Historical Reader of Old Irish: Texts, Paradigms, Notes, and a Complete Glossary. Halle: M. Niemeyer (reprint: New York: AMS, 1985).
- Altirische Grammatik. Berlin–Leipzig: Walter de Gruyter, 1925.
- Alois Walde, Vergleichendes Wörterbuch der indogermanischen Sprachen, 3 vols. Edited and supplemented by Julius Pokorny. Berlin: de Gruyter, 1927–1932 (reprint: 1973, ISBN 3-11-004556-7).
- Zur Urgeschichte der Kelten und Illyrier. Halle: M. Niemeyer, 1938.
- Altkeltische Dichtungen: Aus dem Irisch-Gälischen und Cymrischen übertragen und eingeleitet. Bern: A. Francke, 1944.
- with Vittore Pisani, Allgemeine und vergleichende Sprachwissenschaft: Indogermanistik. Keltologie. Bern: A. Francke, 1953.
- Indogermanisches etymologisches Wörterbuch, 2 vols. Tübingen–Bern–Munich: A. Francke, 1957/1969 (1st edn.), 2005 (5th edn.). ISBN 3772009476

Articles

- "Der Gral in Irland und die mythischen Grundlagen der Gralsage", Mitteilungen der Anthropologischen Gesellschaft in Wien 62 (1912): 1–15.
- "Erschienene Schriften: Rudolf Thurneysen, Zu irischen Handschriften und Literaturdenkmälern", Zeitschrift für celtische Philologie (ZCP) 9 (1913): 184–6.
- "Die englische Herrschaft in Irland", Petermanns Mitteilungen 62 (1916): 361–65, 409–12.
- "Der irische Aufstand von 1798", Irische Blätter 4 (1916): 331–340.
- "Rasse und Volk in Irland", Irische Blätter 7 (1917): 524–528.
- "Beiträge zur ältesten Geschichte Irlands. 1. Die Fir Bolg, die Urbevölkerung Irlands", ZCP 11 (1916–17): 189–204.
- "Beiträge zur ältesten Geschichte Irlands. 2. Der gae bolga und die nördliche, nicht-iberische Urbevölkerung der Britischen Inseln", ZCP 12 (1918): 195–231.
- "Beiträge zur ältesten Geschichte Irlands. 3. Érainn, Dárin(n)e und die Iverni und Darini des Ptolemäus", ZCP 12 (1918): 323–357.
- "Zu Morands Fürstenspiegel", ZCP 13 (1921): 43–6.
- "Das nichtindogermanische Substrat im Irischen", ZCP 16 (1927): 95–144, 231–66, 363–94; 17 (1928): 373–88; 18 (1930): 233–48.
- "Substrattheorie und Urheimat der Indogermanen", Mitteilungen der Anthropologischen Gesellschaft in Wien 66 (1936): 69–91.
- "Zum nichtindogermanischen Substrat im Inselkeltischen", Die Sprache 1 (1949): 235–45.
- "Die Geographie Irlands bei Ptolemaios", ZCP 24 (1954): 94–120.
- "Keltische Urgeschichte und Sprachwissenschaft", Die Sprache 5 (1959): 152–64.
- "The Pre-Celtic Inhabitants of Ireland", Celtica 5 (1960): 229–40.

== See also ==
- Gustaf Kossinna
- Pan-Illyrian theories
