= Karl Brugmann =

German linguist (1849–1919)

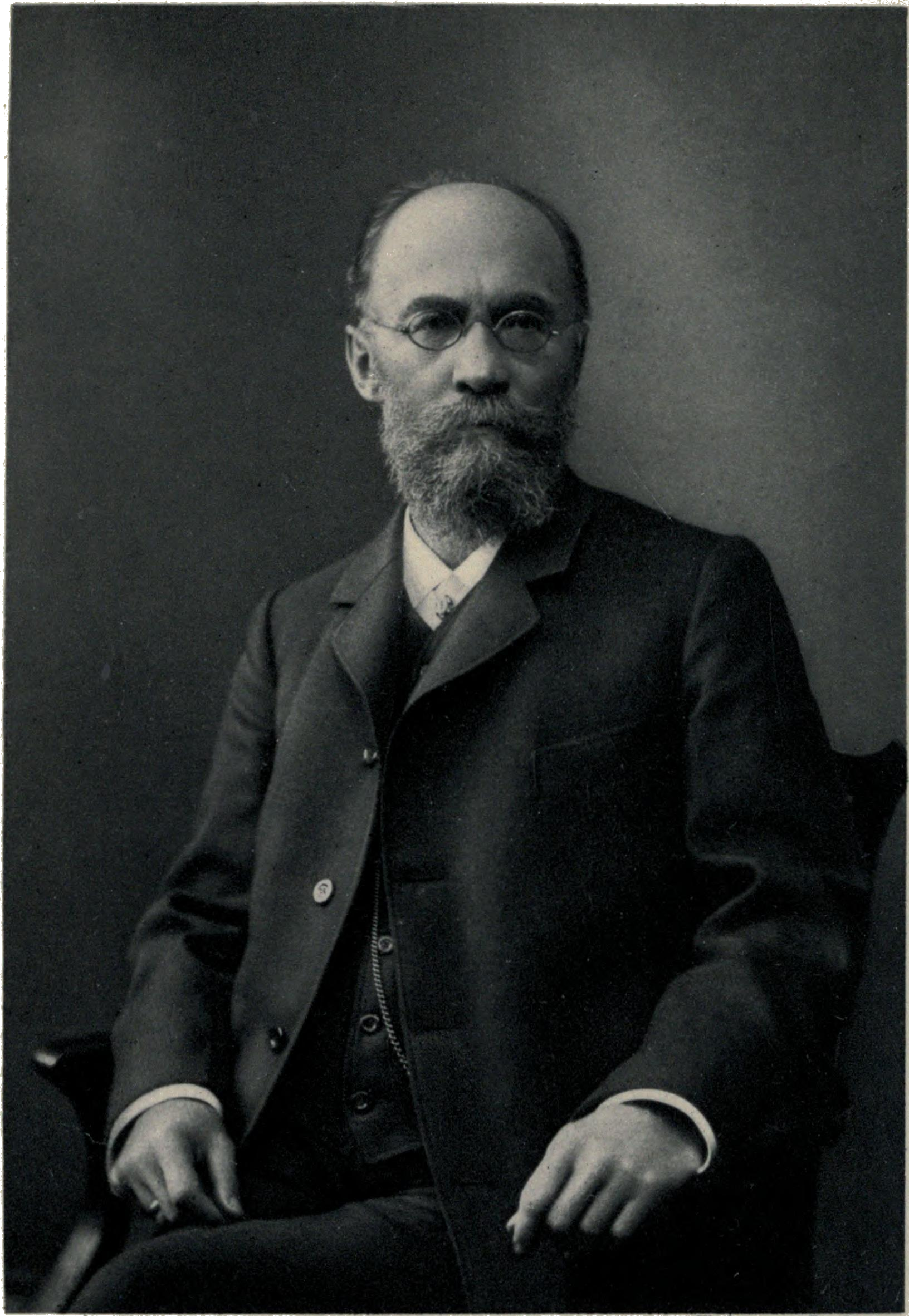
- Born: Karl Friedrich Christian Brugman; 16 March 1849; Wiesbaden, Duchy of Nassau
- Died: 29 June 1919 (aged 70); Leipzig, Weimar Republic
- Spouse: Valeska "Therese" Friedrike Berner (m. 1882)

Academic background
- Education: Leipzig University
- Doctoral advisor: Georg Curtius

Academic work
- Discipline: Linguistics
- Sub-discipline: Indo-European studies; historical linguistics
- Institutions: Leipzig University; University of Freiburg
- Military service
- Allegiance: Prussia
- Branch: Prussian Army
- Service years: 1867 (Note: Possibly again in 1870 at Wiesbaden Military Hospital; it is unclear whether Brugmann's military hospital service (German: Lazerettdienst) was a second military service.)
- Unit: 80th Regiment

Karl Friedrich Christian Brugmann (Note: German pronunciation: [kaɐ̯l ˈfʁiː.dʁɪç ˈkʁɪstjan bruːgman]) (/ˈbruɡmən/ BROOG-mən; né Brugman; (Note: Dutch pronunciation: [ˈbrʏɣ.mɑn]) 16 March 1849 – 29 June 1919) was a German linguist and one of the founders of the Neogrammarian school. He is best known for his contributions to Indo-European linguistics, particularly in the fields of historical phonology and morphology. Brugmann contributed to the formulation of the Neogrammarian principle of the regularity of sound change and was a principal author of the Grundriss der vergleichenden Grammatik der indogermanischen Sprachen, a reference work in comparative Indo-European grammar.

== Early life and family ==
Karl Friedrich Christian Brugman (Note: The original spelling of the surname only contained one n; the family name changed in 1882.) was born on 16 March 1849 in Wiesbaden to a middle-class Lutheran couple, Eleonore Christiane "Janchen" Philippine (née Enders) and Karl Wilhelm Heinrich Brugman. The family was of partial Dutch extraction, including the name "Brugman" itself; Karl's great-grandfather – Herman Diederick Brugman – was born in The Hague in 1743 and served the Prince of Nassau-Weilburg before moving to Kirchheimbolanden in the Palatinate to begin a wine business there. The Dutch ancestry of the family can be traced back to around 1600.

Brugmann's father was originally a forester, but an extreme case of rheumatism left him unable to do heavy labor. He later became a public servant, becoming the Director of the State Treasury (German: Rechnungsrat) for the Duchy of Nassau, including during and after the Prussian occupation of Wiesbaden. This experience left him extremely bitter and left his relationship with Karl somewhat strained. Christiane was the daughter of a printer. She had thirteen children between 1846 and 1866, five of whom died from pulmonary paralysis as a result of whooping cough in childhood though all of her children at one point had the disease. The surviving children comprised six sons and two daughters.

During his childhood, Brugmann developed a case of shingles, which left him with periostitis in his jaw and bedridden for several months. A mistake made by one of the treating doctors left his nose so deformed, he reported he had heard that his mother "shed bitter tears over it". A neighbor's dog also bit Brugmann's left earlobe off when he was a young boy.

Brugmann attended a local kindergarten and preparatory school (Vorbereitungsschule) to prepare him for Gymnasium. Brugmann's father had him and his brothers learn bookbinding with a local craftsman while in school so they could bind their own schoolbooks. Excelling in his studies, Karl was accelerated and allowed to begin Gymnasium a year early. Like his brothers, Brugmann chose to attend at the Wiesbaden Gymnasium instead of the Realgymnasium across the street. There, he learned Ancient Greek from Emanuel Bernhardt, a Homeric scholar, which he described as his favorite class. He studied alongside Hermann Diels, a later German classicist himself, graduating on Easter 1867. Following graduation, Brugmann joined the Prussian Army with his older brother Hugo in the spring. Both brothers served one-year of voluntary military service, with Karl serving with the 80th Regiment.

== Education ==
Brugmann began studying classics, classical philology, and linguistics at the University of Halle in 1867 and completed his military service the same year. While there, he was a member of the student choir as a tenor for all three semesters, during which he worked under the German composer Robert Franz. The following year, he left to study at Leipzig University. He was briefly activated between August and October 1870 to serve at the military hospital (Lazarett) in Wiesbaden following the outbreak of the Franco-Prussian War. In 1871, Brugmann was awarded his doctorate under the tutelage of Georg Curtius.

Following a successful Staatsexamen in Bonn in 1872, Brugmann returned to his hometown to complete his probationary year as a teacher. There, he worked under his old schoolmaster, Karl Schwartz, an ultramontane Catholic and the brother of a prominent Prussian artillery general; Brugmann, although acknowledging his historical knowledge, had a profound feeling of dislike for Schwartz, describing him as "a vain careerist, a man for whom one lost respect the more one got to know him".

Brugmann returned to Leipzig thereafter, hired as a teacher at the prestigious Nikolaischule. There, he continued his musical efforts with the Leipzig chapter of the Bach Society under Heinrich von Herzogenberg, though he finally quit after having "sung [him]self hoarse" since the tenor section was dwarfed by number of singers in alto, bass, and soprano who numbered in the dozens, forcing him to shout-sing with only one or two partners. After quitting, he "said goodbye to the art of singing forever".

== Career ==
Between 1872 and 1877 Brugmann was assistant at the Russian Institute of Classical Philology at the latter. In 1877 he was lecturer at the University of Leipzig, and in 1882 he became professor of comparative philology there. In 1884 he took the same position at the University of Freiburg, but returned to Leipzig in 1887 as successor to Georg Curtius; for the rest of his professional life (until 1919), Brugmann was professor of Sanskrit and comparative linguistics there.

As a young man, Brugmann sided with the emerging Neogrammarian school, which asserted the inviolability of phonetic laws (such as in Brugmann's law) and adhered to a strict research methodology. As well as in laying stress on the observation of phonetic laws and their operation, it emphasized the working of analogy as an important linguistic factor in modern languages.

As joint editor with Curtius of The Studies in Greek and Latin Grammar, he wrote an article for this work on "Nasalis Sonans," in which he defended theories so radical that Curtius afterward disclaimed them. Brugmann's fame rests on the two volumes on phonology, morphology, and word formation which he contributed to the five-volume Grundriß der vergleichenden Grammatik der indogermanischen Sprachen ('Outline of the Comparative Grammar of the Indo-Germanic Languages'), published from 1886 to 1893. The other three volumes were written by Berthold Delbrück and provided a still-unsurpassed account of Proto-Indo-European syntax. Brugmann's work overflowed the bounds assigned to it, so the first volume was split into two parts. With the indexes split off into a separate volume, the two volumes turned into four.

Realizing the importance of Brugmann's work, three British linguists began publishing an English translation of Brugmann's volumes almost simultaneously with the German edition, under the title Elements of the Comparative Grammar of the Indo-Germanic Languages. This divided Brugmann's second volume into two parts, making a total of five volumes including the indices.

Beginning in 1897, Brugmann began publishing a revision and expansion of his portion of the Grundriß. The final volume of the resulting second edition was published in 1916.

Brugmann's method in presenting his data was radical and can still raise eyebrows today. On most topics, instead of presenting discursive arguments, he simply listed the data which he felt were relevant. The reader was obliged to make up his own mind as to their interpretation. This totally empirical presentation multiplies the time necessary to follow Brugmann's argument, but makes the effort all the more fruitful.

Brugmann's great work did not come out of the blue. It was based on the previous Indo-Germanic grammar by August Schleicher, and that in turn on the previous effort of Franz Bopp. In addition, Brugmann stayed in touch closely with the scholars who were revolutionizing Indo-European linguistics for the daughter languages, in particular Bartholomae for Old Iranian, Hübschmann for Armenian, and Rudolf Thurneysen for Old Irish.

In 1902–1904, Brugmann published an abridged and slightly modified version of his Grammar, which is still considered a useful reference work by some but does not contain the wealth of data of the longer versions. A French translation of this abridged version exists.

The total list of Brugmann's works is much longer than this. Some of them were important in their time and some are still of continuing interest, but it is on the two editions of the Grundriß that his reputation rests. They remain indispensable to every Indo-Europeanist and of great interest to anybody interested in language.

Brugmann was knighted by the King of Saxony, and in 1896 he was invited to attend the jubilee of Princeton University, where he received the degree of doctor of laws.

== Personal life ==
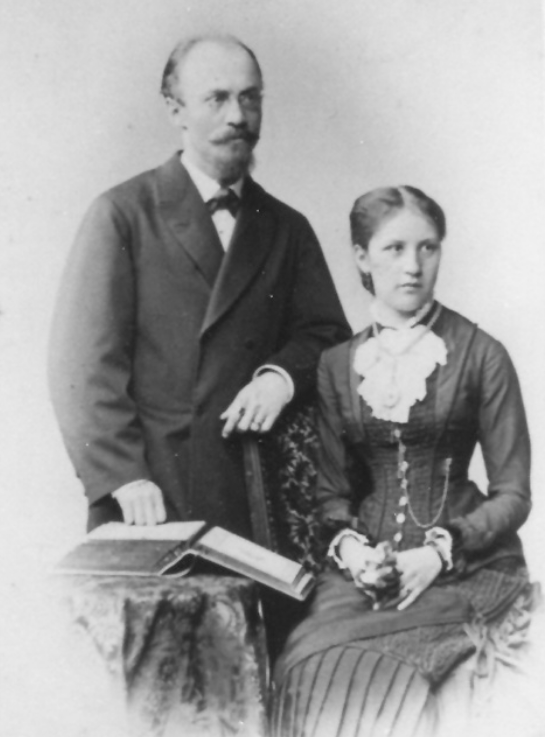
Brugmann with his wife, Valeska

At the behest of the Standesamt, the entire Brugmann family adopted the double-n spelling in 1882, which was viewed as more natively German as compared to the Dutch spelling "Brugman"; Karl's original birth certificate included the second n due to a typo by the clerk. In May of the same year, Brugmann married Valeska "Therese" Friedrike Berner, the daughter of Fritz Berner, a Privy Councilor of Justice (Geheimer Justizrat) and director of the district court (Landgerichtsdirektor).

As a boy, Brugmann mastered Gabelsberger shorthand, even attending a trip to Cologne to prove children could master the form. Later in life, Brugmann adapted the orthography and created new characters for his own use, which he believed had never been deciphered during his lifetime.

== Works ==
- Morphologische Untersuchungen auf dem Gebiete der indogermanischen Sprachen, with Hermann Osthoff ("Morphological Researches in the Indo-European Languages"; 6 vols.)
- "A Problem of Homeric Textual Criticism" (1870)
- "Lithuanian Folk Songs and Tales" (with August Leskien; 1882)
- Grundriss der vergleichenden Grammatik der indogermanischen Sprachen (1886) ("Elements of the Comparative Grammar of the Indo-Germanic Languages", 5 vols.)
- "The Present Position of Philology"
- "Greek Grammar
- "Short Comparative Grammar" (1902)
- "Die Syntax des einfachen Satzes im Indogermanischen" (1925)

With Wilhelm Streitberg, he founded the journal Indogermanische Forschungen ('Indo-European Research')

== See also ==
- Horror aequi – Linguistic principle of repetition avoidance, coined by Brugmann in 1909
