= Comparative linguistics =

Branch of linguistics

Comparative linguistics is a branch of historical linguistics that is concerned with comparing languages to establish their historical relatedness.

Genetic relatedness implies a common origin or proto-language and comparative linguistics aims to construct language families, to reconstruct proto-languages and specify the changes that have resulted in the documented languages. To maintain a clear distinction between attested and reconstructed forms, comparative linguists prefix an asterisk to any form that is not found in surviving texts. A number of methods for carrying out language classification have been developed, ranging from simple inspection to computerised hypothesis testing. Such methods have gone through a long process of development.

== Methods ==
The fundamental technique of comparative linguistics is to compare phonological systems, morphological systems, syntax and the lexicon of two or more languages using techniques such as the comparative method. In principle, every difference between two related languages should be explicable to a high degree of plausibility; systematic changes, for example in phonological or morphological systems are expected to be highly regular (consistent). In practice, the comparison may be more restricted, e.g. just to the lexicon. In some methods it may be possible to reconstruct an earlier proto-language. Although the proto-languages reconstructed by the comparative method are hypothetical, a reconstruction may have predictive power. The most notable example of this is Ferdinand de Saussure's proposal that the Indo-European consonant system contained laryngeals, a type of consonant attested in no Indo-European language known at the time. The hypothesis was vindicated with the discovery of Hittite, which proved to have exactly the consonants Saussure had hypothesized in the environments he had predicted.

Where languages are derived from a distant ancestor, and are thus more distantly related, the comparative method becomes less practicable. In particular, attempting to relate two reconstructed proto-languages by the comparative method has not generally produced results that have met with wide acceptance. The method has also not been good at unambiguously identifying sub-families; thus, different scholars have produced conflicting results, for example in Indo-European. A number of methods based on statistical analysis of vocabulary have been developed to try and overcome this limitation, such as lexicostatistics and mass comparison. The former uses lexical cognates like the comparative method, while the latter uses only lexical similarity. The theoretical basis of such methods is that vocabulary items can be matched without a detailed language reconstruction and that comparing enough vocabulary items will negate individual inaccuracies; thus, they can be used to determine relatedness but not to determine the proto-language.

== History ==
The earliest method of this type was the comparative method, which was developed over a number of years, culminating in the nineteenth century. This uses a long word list and detailed study. However, it has been criticized for example as subjective, informal, and lacking testability. The comparative method uses information from two or more languages and allows reconstruction of the ancestral language. The method of internal reconstruction uses only a single language, with comparison of word variants, to perform the same function. Internal reconstruction is more resistant to interference but usually has a limited available base of utilizable words and is able to reconstruct only certain changes (those that have left traces as morphophonological variations).

In the twentieth century an alternative method, lexicostatistics, was developed, which is mainly associated with Morris Swadesh but is based on earlier work. This uses a short word list of basic vocabulary in the various languages for comparisons. Swadesh used 100 (earlier 200) items that are assumed to be cognate (on the basis of phonetic similarity) in the languages being compared, though other lists have also been used. Distance measures are derived by examination of language pairs but such methods reduce the information. An outgrowth of lexicostatistics is glottochronology, initially developed in the 1950s, which proposed a mathematical formula for establishing the date when two languages separated, based on percentage of a core vocabulary of culturally independent words. In its simplest form a constant rate of change is assumed, though later versions allow variance but still fail to achieve reliability. Glottochronology has met with mounting scepticism, and is seldom applied today. Dating estimates can now be generated by computerised methods that have fewer restrictions, calculating rates from the data. However, no mathematical means of producing proto-language split-times on the basis of lexical retention has been proven reliable.

Another controversial method, developed by Joseph Greenberg, is mass comparison. The method, which disavows any ability to date developments, aims simply to show which languages are more and less close to each other. Greenberg suggested that the method is useful for preliminary grouping of languages known to be related as a first step toward more in-depth comparative analysis. However, since mass comparison eschews the establishment of regular changes, it is flatly rejected by the majority of historical linguists.

Recently, computerised statistical hypothesis testing methods have been developed which are related to both the comparative method and lexicostatistics. Character based methods are similar to the former and distanced based methods are similar to the latter (see Quantitative comparative linguistics). The characters used can be morphological or grammatical as well as lexical. Since the mid-1990s these more sophisticated tree- and network-based phylogenetic methods have been used to investigate the relationships between languages and to determine approximate dates for proto-languages. These are considered by some to show promise but are not wholly accepted by traditionalists. However, they are not intended to replace older methods but to supplement them. Such statistical methods cannot be used to derive the features of a proto-language, apart from the fact of the existence of shared items of the compared vocabulary. These approaches have been challenged for their methodological problems, since without a reconstruction or at least a detailed list of phonological correspondences there can be no demonstration that two words in different languages are cognate.

== Related fields ==
There are other branches of linguistics that involve comparing languages, which are not, however, part of comparative linguistics:

- Linguistic typology compares languages to classify them by their features. Its ultimate aim is to understand the universals that govern language, and the range of types found in the world's languages in respect of any particular feature (word order or vowel system, for example). Typological similarity does not imply a historical relationship. However, typological arguments can be used in comparative linguistics: one reconstruction may be preferred to another as typologically more plausible.
- Contact linguistics examines the linguistic results of contact between the speakers of different languages, particularly as evidenced in loan words. An empirical study of loans is by definition historical in focus and therefore forms part of the subject matter of historical linguistics. One of the goals of etymology is to establish which items in a language's vocabulary result from linguistic contact. This is also an important issue both for the comparative method and for the lexical comparison methods, since failure to recognize a loan may distort the findings.
- Contrastive linguistics compares languages usually with the aim of assisting language learning by identifying important differences between the learner's native and target languages. Contrastive linguistics deals solely with present-day languages.

== Pseudolinguistic comparisons ==
Comparative linguistics includes the study of the historical relationships of languages using the comparative method to search for regular (i.e., recurring) correspondences between the languages' phonology, grammar, and core vocabulary, and through hypothesis testing, which involves examining specific patterns of similarity and difference across languages; some persons with little or no specialization in the field sometimes attempt to establish historical associations between languages by noting similarities between them, in a way that is considered pseudoscientific by specialists (e.g. spurious comparisons between Ancient Egyptian and languages like Wolof, as proposed by Diop in the 1960s).

The most common method applied in pseudoscientific language comparisons is to search two or more languages for words that seem similar in their sound and meaning. While similarities of this kind often seem convincing to laypersons, linguistic scientists consider this kind of comparison to be unreliable for two primary reasons. First, the method applied is not well-defined: the criterion of similarity is subjective and thus not subject to verification or falsification, which is contrary to the principles of the scientific method. Second, the large size of all languages' vocabulary and a relatively limited inventory of articulated sounds used by most languages makes it easy to find coincidentally similar words between languages.

There are sometimes political or religious reasons for associating languages in ways that some linguists would dispute. For example, it has been suggested that the Turanian or Ural–Altaic language group, which relates Sami and other languages to the Mongolian language, was used to justify racism towards the Sami in particular. There are also strong, albeit areal not genetic, similarities between the Uralic and Altaic languages which provided an innocent basis for this theory. In 1930s Turkey, some promoted the Sun Language Theory, one that showed that Turkic languages were close to the original language. Some believers in Abrahamic religions try to derive their native languages from Classical Hebrew, as Herbert W. Armstrong, a proponent of British Israelism, who said that the word British comes from Hebrew brit meaning 'covenant' and ish meaning 'man', supposedly proving that the British people are the 'covenant people' of God. And Lithuanian-American archaeologist Marija Gimbutas argued during the mid-1900s that Basque is clearly related to the extinct Pictish and Etruscan languages, in attempt to show that Basque was a remnant of an "Old European culture". In the Dissertatio de origine gentium Americanarum (1625), the Dutch lawyer Hugo Grotius "proves" that the American Indians (Mohawks) speak a language (lingua Maquaasiorum) derived from Scandinavian languages (Grotius was on Sweden's payroll), supporting Swedish colonial pretensions in America. The Dutch doctor Johannes Goropius Becanus, in his Origines Antverpiana (1580) admits Quis est enim qui non amet patrium sermonem ("Who does not love his fathers' language?"), whilst asserting that Hebrew is derived from Dutch. The Frenchman Éloi Johanneau claimed in 1818 (Mélanges d'origines étymologiques et de questions grammaticales) that the Celtic language is the oldest, and the mother of all others.

In 1759, Joseph de Guignes theorized (Mémoire dans lequel on prouve que les Chinois sont une colonie égyptienne) that the Chinese and Egyptians were related, the former being a colony of the latter. In 1885, Edward Tregear (The Aryan Maori) compared the Maori and "Aryan" languages. Jean Prat, in his 1941 Les langues nitales, claimed that the Bantu languages of Africa are descended from Latin, coining the French linguistic term nitale in doing so. Just as Egyptian is related to Brabantic, following Becanus in his Hieroglyphica, still using comparative methods.

The first practitioners of comparative linguistics were not universally acclaimed: upon reading Becanus' book, Scaliger wrote, "never did I read greater nonsense", and Leibniz coined the term goropism (from Goropius) to designate a far-sought, ridiculous etymology.

There have also been assertions that humans are descended from non-primate animals, with the use of the voice being the primary basis for comparison. Jean-Pierre Brisset (in La Grande Nouvelle, around 1900) believed and claimed that humans evolved from frogs through linguistic connections, arguing that the croaking of frogs resembles spoken French. He suggested that the French word logement, meaning 'dwelling,' originated from the word l'eau, which means 'water.'

== See also ==
- Comparative method
- Comparative literature
- Contrastive analysis
- Contrastive linguistics
- Glottochronology
- Historical linguistics
- Intercontinental Dictionary Series
- Lexicostatistics
- Mass comparison
- Moscow School of Comparative Linguistics
- Pseudoscientific language comparison
- Quantitative comparative linguistics
- Sound law

== Bibliography ==
- August Schleicher: Compendium der vergleichenden Grammatik der indogermanischen Sprachen. (Kurzer Abriss der indogermanischen Ursprache, des Altindischen, Altiranischen, Altgriechischen, Altitalischen, Altkeltischen, Altslawischen, Litauischen und Altdeutschen.) (2 vols.) Weimar, H. Boehlau (1861/62); reprinted by Minerva GmbH, Wissenschaftlicher Verlag, ISBN 3-8102-1071-4
- Karl Brugmann, Berthold Delbrück, Grundriss der vergleichenden Grammatik der indogermanischen Sprachen (1886–1916).
- Raimo Anttila, Historical and Comparative Linguistics (Benjamins, 1989) ISBN 90-272-3557-0
- Theodora Bynon, Historical Linguistics (Cambridge University Press, 1977) ISBN 0-521-29188-7
- Richard D. Janda and Brian D. Joseph (Eds), The Handbook of Historical Linguistics (Blackwell, 2004) ISBN 1-4051-2747-3
- Giles, Peter; Sievers, Eduard (1911). "Philology" . Encyclopædia Britannica. Vol. 21 (11th ed.). pp. 414–438.
- Roger Lass, Historical linguistics and language change. (Cambridge University Press, 1997) ISBN 0-521-45924-9
- Winfred P. Lehmann, Historical Linguistics: An Introduction (Holt, 1962) ISBN 0-03-011430-6
- Joseph Salmons, Bibliography of historical-comparative linguistics. Oxford Bibliographies Online.
- R.L. Trask (ed.), Dictionary of Historical and Comparative Linguistics (Fitzroy Dearborn, 2001) ISBN 1-57958-218-4
