= Proto-Indo-European nominals =

Category of words in Proto-Indo-European

Proto-Indo-European nominals include nouns, adjectives, and pronouns. Their grammatical forms and meanings have been reconstructed by modern linguists, based on similarities found across all Indo-European languages. This article discusses nouns and adjectives; Proto-Indo-European pronouns are treated elsewhere.

The Proto-Indo-European language (PIE) had eight or nine cases, three numbers (singular, dual and plural) and probably originally two genders (animate and neuter), with the animate later splitting into the masculine and the feminine.

Nominals fell into multiple different declensions. Most of them had word stems ending in a consonant (called athematic stems) and exhibited a complex pattern of accent shifts and/or vowel changes (ablaut) among the different cases.

Two declensions ended in a vowel (*-o/-e (Note: The asterisk (*) indicates that the form is not directly attested but has been reconstructed on the basis of other linguistic material.)) and are called thematic; they were more regular and became more common during the history of PIE and its older daughter languages.

PIE very frequently derived nominals from verbs. Just as English giver and gift are ultimately related to the verb give, *déh₃tors 'giver' and *déh₃nom 'gift' are derived from *deh₃- 'to give', but the practice was much more common in PIE. For example, *pṓds 'foot' was derived from *ped- 'to tread', and *dómh₂s 'house' from *demh₂- 'to build'.

== Morphology ==
The basic structure of Proto-Indo-European nouns and adjectives was the same as that of PIE verbs. A lexical word (as would appear in a dictionary) was formed by adding a suffix (S) onto a root (R) to form a stem. The word was then inflected by adding an ending (E) to the stem.

The root indicates a basic concept, often a verb (e.g. *deh₃- 'give'), while the stem carries a more specific nominal meaning based on the combination of root and suffix (e.g. *déh₃-tor- 'giver', *déh₃-o- 'gift'). Some stems cannot clearly be broken up into root and suffix altogether, as in *h₂r̥tḱo- 'bear'.

The ending carries grammatical information, including case, number, and gender. Gender is an inherent property of a noun but is part of the inflection of an adjective, because it must agree with the gender of the noun it modifies.

Thus, the general morphological form of such words is R+S+E:

$$\underbrace{\underbrace{\mathrm{root+suffix}}_{\mathrm{stem}} + \mathrm{ending}}_{\mathrm{word}}$$

The process of forming a lexical stem from a root is known in general as derivational morphology, while the process of inflecting that stem is known as inflectional morphology. As in other languages, the possible suffixes that can be added to a given root, and the meaning that results, are not entirely predictable, while the process of inflection is largely predictable in both form and meaning.

Originally, extensive ablaut (vowel variation, between *e, *o, *ē, *ō and Ø, i.e. no vowel) occurred in PIE, in both derivation and inflection and in the root, suffix, and ending. Variation in the position of the accent likewise occurred in both derivation and inflection, and is often considered part of the ablaut system (which is described in more detail below).

For example, the nominative form *léymons 'lake' (composed of the root *ley- in the ablaut form *léy-, the suffix in the form *-mon- and the ending in the form *-s) had the genitive *limnés (root form *li-, (Note: *i and *y are actually the same sound; technically speaking, *i is the vocalic allophone of *y. The same applies to the pairs *u/w, *m̥/m, etc. See Proto-Indo-European phonology: Vowels for further information on spelling and syllabification rules for PIE sonorants.) suffix *-mn- and ending *-és). In this word, the nominative has the ablaut vowels *é–o–Ø while the genitive has the ablaut vowels *Ø–Ø–é — i.e. all three components have different ablaut vowels, and the stress position has also moved.

A large number of different patterns of ablaut variation existed; speakers had to both learn the ablaut patterns and memorize which pattern went with which word. There was a certain regularity of which patterns occurred with which suffixes and formations, but with many exceptions.

Already by late PIE times, this system was extensively simplified, and daughter languages show a steady trend towards more and more regularization and simplification.

Far more simplification occurred in the late PIE nominal system than in the verbal system, where the original PIE ablaut variations were maintained essentially intact well into the recorded history of conservative daughter languages such as Sanskrit and Ancient Greek, as well as in the Germanic languages (in the form of strong verbs).

=== Root nouns ===
PIE also had a class of monosyllabic root nouns which lack a suffix, the ending being directly added to the root (as in *dómh₂-s 'house', derived from *demh₂- 'build'). These nouns can also be interpreted as having a zero suffix or one without a phonetic body (*dómh₂-Ø-s).

Verbal stems have corresponding morphological features, the root present and the root aorist.

=== Complex nominals ===
Not all nominals fit the basic R+S+E pattern. Some were formed with additional prefixes. An example is *ni-sd-ó-s 'nest', derived from the verbal root *sed- 'sit' by adding a local prefix and thus meaning "where [the bird] sits down" or the like.

A special kind of prefixation, called reduplication, uses the first part of the root plus a vowel as a prefix. For example, *kʷelh₁- 'turn' gives *kʷe-kʷl(h₁)-ó-s 'wheel', and *bʰrew- 'brown' gives *bʰé-bʰru-s 'beaver'. This type of derivation is also found in verbs, mainly to form the perfect.

As with PIE verbs, a distinction is made between primary formations, which are words formed directly from a root as described above, and secondary formations, which are formed from existing words (whether primary or secondary themselves).

=== Athematic and thematic nominals ===
A fundamental distinction is made between thematic and athematic nominals.

The stem of athematic nominals ends in a consonant. They have the original complex system of accent/ablaut alternations described above and are generally held as more archaic.

Thematic nominals, which became more and more common during the times of later PIE and its younger daughter languages, have a stem ending in a thematic vowel, *-o- in almost all grammatical cases, sometimes ablauting to *-e-. Since all roots end in a consonant, all thematic nominals have suffixes ending in a vowel, and none are root nouns. The accent is fixed on the same syllable throughout the inflection.

From the perspective of the daughter languages, a distinction is often made between vowel stems (that is, stems ending in a vowel: i-, u-, (y)ā-, (y)o-stems) and consonantic stems (the rest). However, from the PIE perspective, only the thematic (o-)stems are truly vocalic. Stems ending in *i or *u such as *men-ti- are consonantic (i.e. athematic) because the *i is just the vocalic form of the glide *y, the full grade of the suffix being *-tey-. Post-PIE ā was actually *eh₂ in PIE.

Among the most common athematic stems are root stems, i-stems, u-stems, eh₂-stems, n-stems, nt-stems, r-stems and s-stems. Within each of these, numerous subclasses with their own inflectional peculiarities developed by late PIE times.

== Grammatical categories ==
PIE nouns and adjectives (as well as pronouns) are subject to the system of PIE nominal inflection with eight or nine cases: nominative, accusative, vocative, genitive, dative, instrumental, ablative, locative, and possibly a directive or allative.

The so-called strong or direct cases are the nominative and the vocative for all numbers, and the accusative case for singular and dual (and possibly plural as well), and the rest are the weak or oblique cases. This classification is relevant for inflecting the athematic nominals of different accent and ablaut classes.

=== Number ===
Three numbers were distinguished: singular, dual and plural. Many (possibly all) athematic neuter nouns had a special collective form instead of the plural, which inflected with singular endings, but with the ending *-h₂ in the direct cases, and an amphikinetic accent/ablaut pattern (see below).

=== Gender ===
Late PIE had three genders, traditionally called masculine, feminine and neuter. Gender or noun class is an inherent (lexical) property of each noun; all nouns in a language that have grammatical genders are assigned to one of its classes. There was probably originally only an animate (masculine/feminine) versus an inanimate (neuter) distinction. This view is supported by the existence of certain classes of Latin and Ancient Greek adjectives which inflect only for two sets of endings: one for masculine and feminine, the other for neuter. Further evidence comes from the Anatolian languages such as Hittite which exhibit only the animate and the neuter genders.

The feminine ending is thought to have developed from a collective/abstract suffix *-h₂ that also gave rise to the neuter collective. The existence of combined collective and abstract grammatical forms can be seen in English words such as youth = "the young people (collective)" or "young age (abstract)".

Remnants of this period exist in (for instance) the eh₂-stems, ih₂-stems, uh₂-stems and bare h₂-stems, which are found in daughter languages as ā-, ī-, ū- and a-stems, respectively. They originally were the feminine equivalents of the o-stems, i-stems, u-stems and root nouns. Already by late PIE times, however, this system was breaking down. *-eh₂ became generalized as the feminine suffix, and eh₂-stem nouns evolved more and more in the direction of thematic o-stems, with fixed ablaut and accent, increasingly idiosyncratic endings and frequent borrowing of endings from the o-stems. Nonetheless, clear traces of the earlier system are seen especially in Sanskrit, where ī-stems and ū-stems still exist as distinct classes comprising largely feminine nouns. Over time, these stem classes merged with i-stems and u-stems, with frequent crossover of endings.

Grammatical gender correlates only partially with sex, and almost exclusively when it relates to humans and domesticated animals. Even then, those correlations may not be consistent: nouns referring to adult males are usually masculine (father, brother, priest), nouns referring to adult females (mother, sister, priestess) are usually feminine, but diminutives may be neuter regardless of referent, as in both Greek and German. Gender may have also had a grammatical function, a change of gender within a sentence signaling the end of a noun phrase (a head noun and its agreeing adjectives) and the start of a new one.

An alternative hypothesis to the two-gender view is that Proto-Anatolian inherited a three-gender PIE system, and subsequently Hittite and other Anatolian languages eliminated the feminine by merging it with the masculine.

=== Case endings ===
Some endings are difficult to reconstruct and not all authors reconstruct the same sets of endings. For example, the original form of the genitive plural is a particular thorny issue, because different daughter languages appear to reflect different proto-forms. It is variously reconstructed as *-ōm, *-om, *-oHom, and so on. Meanwhile, the dual endings of cases other than the merged nominative/vocative/accusative are often considered impossible to reconstruct because these endings are attested sparsely and diverge radically in different languages.

The following shows three modern mainstream reconstructions. Sihler (1995) remains closest to the data, often reconstructing multiple forms when daughter languages show divergent outcomes. Ringe (2006) is somewhat more speculative, willing to assume analogical changes in some cases to explain divergent outcomes from a single source form. Fortson (2004) is between Sihler and Ringe.

The thematic vowel *-o- ablauts to *-e- in word-final position in the vocative singular, and before *h₂. The vocative singular is also the only case for which the thematic nouns show accent retraction, a leftward shift of the accent, denoted by *-ĕ.

		Athematic			Thematic		
		Sihler	Ringe	Fortson	Sihler	Ringe	Fortson
Singular	nominative	*-s ~ *-Ø		*-s	*-o-s		
Singular	vocative	*-Ø			*-ĕ		
Singular	accusative	*-m			*-o-m		
Singular	Nom./Voc./Acc. (n.)	*-Ø			*-o-m		
Singular	genitive	*-s ~ *-os ~ *-es		*-s	*-ī, *-osyo	*-o-syo (?)	*-o-s (?)
Singular	ablative	*-s ~ *-os ~ *-es		*-s	*-ōt, *-āt	*-e-ad	*-o(h₂)at > *-ōt
Singular	dative	*-ey			*-ōy	*-o-ey > *-ōy	
Singular	instrumental	*-bʰi ~ *-mi ~ *-(e)h₁	*-é-h₁ ~ *-h₁	*-h₁	*-o-h₁ ~ *-e-h₁	*-o-h₁ > (Note: "<" means comes from; ">" means turns into.) *-ō	
Singular	locative	*-i, *-Ø^{§}			*-o-y ~ *-e-y	*(*-e →) *-e-y	*-o-y
Dual	Nom./Voc./Acc.	*-h₁e ~ *-h₁	*-h₁e	*-h₁	*-o-h₁ ~ *-o-(h₁)e	*-o-h₁ > *-ō	
Dual	Nom./Voc./Acc. (n.)	?	*-ih₁		*-oyh₁	*-o-y(h₁)	*-oyh₁
Dual	Abl./Dat./Inst.	?			?		
Dual	gen./Loc.	?	*-ows (?)	?	*-eyows ~ *-oyows (?)	?	?
Plural	Nom./Voc.	*-es			*-ōs -oy (pron.)	*-o-es > *-ōs	
Plural	Acc.	*-ms	*-ns		*-o-ms	*-o-ns	
Plural	Nom./Voc./Acc. (n.)	*-h₂	*-h₂ ~ *-Ø	*-h₂	*-e-h₂ > *-ā		
Plural	Gen.	*-om (?)	*-oHom	*-ōm	*-ōm *-oysōm (pron.)	*-o-oHom	*-ōm
Plural	Abl./Dat.	*-bʰos ~ -mos	*-mos	*-bʰ-^{†}	*-o-bʰos ~ o-mos	*-o-mos (*-o-y-mos?)	*-o(i)bʰ-^{†}
Plural	Inst.	*-bʰis ~ *-mis ~ *-mīs	*-bʰí	*-bʰ-^{†}	*-ōys ~ *-o-mis (?) ~ *-o-mīs (?)	*-ōys	*-o(i)bʰ-^{†}
Plural	Loc.	*-su			*(*-o-su?) *-oysu (pron.)	*-o-y-su	

^{†}The dative, instrumental and ablative plural endings probably contained a *bʰ but are of uncertain structure otherwise. They might also have been of post-PIE date.

^{§}For athematic nouns, an endingless locative is reconstructed in addition to the ordinary locative singular in *-i. In contrast to the other weak cases, it typically has full or lengthened grade of the stem.

An alternative reconstruction is found in Beekes (1995). This reconstruction does not give separate tables for the thematic and athematic endings, assuming that they were originally the same and only differentiated in daughter languages.

	Singular		Plural	
	animate	neuter	animate	neuter
Nominative	*-s, *-Ø	*-m, *-Ø	*-es	*-h₂, *-Ø
Vocative	*-Ø	*-m, *-Ø	*-es	*-h₂, *-Ø
Accusative	*-m	*-m, *-Ø	*-ns	*-h₂, *-Ø
Genitive	*-(o)s		*-om	
Ablative	*-(o)s, *-(e)t		*-ios (Note: Compare also Jasanoff (2009), which reconstructs the original ablative plural as *-os based on Hittite -aš and believes that it was secondarily added to the adverbial suffix *-*bʰi that replaced it. He also argues for an original instrumental plural ending *-is, forming the familiar *-bʰis in the same way.)	
Dative	*-(e)i		*-mus	
Instrumental	*-(e)h₁		*-bʰi	
Locative	*-i, *-Ø		*-su	

== Athematic accent/ablaut classes ==
There is a general consensus as to which nominal accent-ablaut patterns must be reconstructed for Proto-Indo-European. Given that the foundations for the system were laid by a group of scholars (Schindler, Eichner, Rix, and Hoffmann) during the 1964 Erlanger Kolloquium, which discussed the works of Pedersen and Kuiper on nominal accent-ablaut patterns in PIE, the system is sometimes referred to as the Erlangen model.

=== Early PIE ===
Early PIE nouns had complex patterns of ablaut according to which the root, the stem and the ending all showed ablaut variations. Polysyllabic athematic nominals (type R+S+E) exhibit four characteristic patterns, which include accent and ablaut alternations throughout the paradigm between the root, the stem and the ending.

- Acrostatic (< Ancient Greek: ἄκρος, romanized: ákros, lit. 'at the edge, beginning' + στατικός, statikós, 'coming to a standstill', "stationary on the beginning"): The accent stays on the root.
- Proterokinetic (< πρότερος, próteros, 'the former, earlier' + κινητικός, kinetikós, 'moveable, mobile', "moving towards the earlier [closer to the root]"): The best evidence for the reconstruction of this type comes from ἄγυιᾰ, gen. ἀγυιᾶς 'street' (< ideal *h₂éǵ-u-ih₂- ~ *h₂ǵ-u-yéh₂-) and ὄργυιᾰ, gen. ὀργυίᾱς 'fathom' (< ideal *h₃réǵ-u-ih₂- ~ *h₃rǵ-u-yéh₂-) in Ancient Greek and bé, gen. mná 'woman' (< *g^{w}én-h₂ ~ *g^{w}n-éh₂-s) in Old Irish.
- Hysterokinetic (< ὕστερος, hýsteros, 'the latter', "moving towards the latter [of the syllables following the root]").
- Amphikinetic (< ἀμφί, amphí, 'about, around, on both sides', "moving towards both sides").

Root nouns (type R+E) show a similar behavior but with only two patterns.

The patterns called "Narten" are, at least formally, analogous to the Narten presents in verbs, as they alternate between full (*e) and lengthened grades (*ē).

Type	Subtype	Case	R	S	E	Example	Gloss
Polysyllabic nominals
Acrostatic	normal	strong	ó	Ø	Ø	nom. sg. *nókʷ-t-s	night
Acrostatic	normal	weak	é	Ø	Ø	gen. sg. *nékʷ-t-s	night
Acrostatic	lengthened ("Narten" type)	strong	ḗ	Ø	Ø	nom. sg. *mḗh₁-n̥-s	moon
Acrostatic	lengthened ("Narten" type)	weak	é	Ø	Ø	gen. sg. *méh₁-n̥s-os	moon
Proterokinetic (or proterodynamic)	Normal	strong	é	Ø	Ø	nom. sg. *mén-ti-s	thought
Proterokinetic (or proterodynamic)	Normal	weak	Ø	é	Ø	gen. sg. *mn̥-téy-s	thought
Proterokinetic (or proterodynamic)	old acrostatic	strong	ó	Ø	Ø	nom. sg. *dór-u	tree
Proterokinetic (or proterodynamic)	old acrostatic	weak	Ø	é	Ø	gen. sg. *dr-éw-s	tree
Hysterokinetic (or hysterodynamic)		strong	Ø	é	Ø	nom. sg. *ph₂-tḗr < *ph₂-tér-s (Note: Only the long vowel forms can be reconstructed but invoking Szemerényi's law creates the link to render them morphologicaly "regular".)	father
Hysterokinetic (or hysterodynamic)		weak	Ø	Ø	é	gen. sg. *ph₂-tr-és	father
Hysterokinetic (or hysterodynamic)		loc. sg.	Ø	é	Ø	loc. sg. *ph₂-tér-(i)	father
Amphikinetic (or amphidynamic)		strong	é	o	Ø	nom. sg. *léy-mō < *léy-mon-s	lake
Amphikinetic (or amphidynamic)		weak	Ø	Ø	é	gen. sg. *li-mn-és	lake
Amphikinetic (or amphidynamic)		loc. sg.	Ø	é	Ø	loc. sg. *li-mén-(i)	lake
Root nouns
Acrostatic	normal	strong	ó		Ø	nom. sg. *dṓm < *dóm-s	house
Acrostatic	normal	weak	é		Ø	gen. sg. *dém-s	house
Acrostatic	lengthened ("Narten" type)	strong	ḗ		Ø	nom. sg. *mḗms	meat
Acrostatic	lengthened ("Narten" type)	weak	é		Ø	gen. sg. **méms-os?	meat
Amphikinetic(?)		strong	é		Ø	nom. sg. *wréh₂d-s	root
Amphikinetic(?)		weak	Ø		é	gen. sg. *wr̥h₂d-és	root
Amphikinetic(?)		loc. sg.	é		Ø	loc. sg. *wréh₂d-(i)	root

Notes:

- For the strong cases of proterokinetic nominals, the accent is placed on the penultimate syllable of the stem. If there is only one suffix, the root will be the penultimate syllable; when there is more than one suffix, the penultimate syllable will be a suffix, and the root will appear unaccented and in the zero grade.
- There is an unexpected o-grade of the suffix in the strong cases of polysyllabic amphikinetic nominals. Another unusual property of this class is the locative singular having a stressed e-grade suffix.

The classification of the amphikinetic root nouns is disputed. Since those words have no suffix, they differ from the amphikinetic polysyllables in the strong cases (no o-grade) and in the locative singular (no e-grade suffix). Some scholars prefer to call them amphikinetic and the corresponding polysyllables holokinetic (or holodynamic, from holos = whole).

Some also list mesostatic (meso = middle) and teleutostatic types, with the accent fixed on the suffix and the ending, respectively, but their existence in PIE is disputed. If these types are accepted, the classes can then be grouped into three static (acrostatic, mesostatic, teleutostatic) and three or four mobile (proterokinetic, hysterokinetic, amphikinetic, holokinetic) paradigms.

=== "Late PIE" ===
By late PIE, the above system had been already significantly eroded, with one of the root ablaut grades tending to be extended throughout the paradigm. The erosion is much more extensive in all the daughter languages, with only the oldest stages of most languages showing any root ablaut and typically only in a small number of irregular nouns:

- Vedic Sanskrit: dā́ru 'wood', gen. drṓs < PIE *dór-u, *dr-éu-s
- Old Irish: ben 'woman', gen. mná < PIE *gʷén-eh₂, *gʷn-éh₂-s
- Old Avestan: zyā̊ 'winter', gen. zimō < PIE *ǵʰy-em-s, *ǵʰi-m-ós
- Ancient Greek: Zdeús 'Zeus', gen. Di(w)ós, Vedic Sanskrit: d(i)yāúḥ 'heaven', gen. diváḥ /dyōḥ, both < PIE *dyēu-s, *diw-ós 'sky, day, god'
- Proto-Germanic: reconstructed *tan(þ)s 'tooth', gen. *tundiz < PIE *h₃d-ónt-s, *h₃d-n̥t-és, with the nominative stem preserved in Old Norse: tǫnn, Old Saxon: tand, Old English: tōþ, and the genitive stem in Gothic: tundus.

The most extensive remains are in Vedic Sanskrit and Old Avestan (the oldest recorded stages of the oldest Indic and Iranian languages, c. 1700–1300 BC); the younger stages of the same languages already show extensive regularization.

In many cases, a former ablauting paradigm was generalized in the daughter languages but in different ways in each language.

For example, Ancient Greek dóru 'spear' < PIE nominative *dóru 'wood, tree' and Old English: trēo 'tree' < PIE genitive *dreu-s reflect different stems of a PIE ablauting paradigm *dóru, *dreus, which is still reflected directly in Vedic Sanskrit nom. dā́ru 'wood', gen. drṓs. Similarly, PIE *ǵónu, *ǵnéus can be reconstructed for 'knee' from Ancient Greek gónu and Old English cnēo. In that case, there is no extant ablauting paradigm in a single language, but Avestan accusative žnūm and Modern Persian zānū are attested, which strongly implies that Proto-Iranian had an ablauting paradigm. That is quite possible for Avestan as well, but that cannot be certain since the nominative is not extant.

An ablauting paradigm *pōds, *ped- can also clearly be reconstructed from 'foot', based on Greek: poús gen. podós (< *pō(d)s, *pod-) vs. Latin: pēs gen. pedis (< *ped-) vs. Old English: fōt (< *pōd-), with differing ablaut grades among cognate forms in different languages.

In some cases, ablaut would be expected based on the form (given numerous other examples of ablauting nouns of the same form), but a single ablaut variant is found throughout the paradigm. In such cases, it is often assumed that the noun had shown ablaut in early PIE, but was generalized to a single form by late PIE or shortly afterwards.

An example is Greek génus 'chin, jaw', Sanskrit hánus 'jaw', Latin gena 'cheek', Gothic kinnus 'cheek'. All except the Latin form suggest a masculine u-stem with non-ablauting PIE root *ǵen-, but certain irregularities (the position of the accent, the unexpected feminine ā-stem form in Latin, the unexpected Gothic stem kinn- < ǵenw-, the ablaut found in Greek gnáthos 'jaw' < PIE *ǵnHdʰ-, Lithuanian: žándas 'jawbone' < *ǵonHdʰ-os) suggest an original ablauting neuter noun *ǵénu, *ǵnéus in early PIE. It generalized the nominative ablaut in late PIE and switched to the masculine u-stem in the post-PIE period.

Another example is *nokʷts 'night'; an acrostatic root paradigm might be expected based on the form, but the consistent stem *nokʷt- is found throughout the family. With the discovery of Hittite, however, the form nekuz [meḫur] 'in the evening' < *nekʷts was found, which is evidently a genitive; it indicates that early PIE actually had an acrostatic paradigm that was regularized by late PIE but after the separation of Hittite.

=== Leiden model ===
Kuiper's student Beekes, together with his colleague Kortlandt, developed an alternative model on the basis of Pedersen's and Kuiper's works, described in detail in Beekes (1985). Since the scholars who developed it and generally accept it are mostly from the University of Leiden, it is generally dubbed the Leiden model. It states that for earlier PIE, three accent types of inflection of consonant stems are to be reconstructed, and from them, all of the attested types can be derived:

Case	Hysterodynamic	Proterodynamic	Static
nominative singular	*CéC-C(-s)	*CéC-C(-s)	*CéC-C(-s)
accusative singular	*CC-éC-m	*CéC-C(-m)	*CéC-C(-m)
genitive singular	*CC-C-és	*CC-éC-s	*CéC-C-s

For root nouns, accentuation could have been either static or mobile:

Case	Static root nouns	Mobile root nouns
nominative singular	*Cé/óC(-s)	*Cé/óC(-s)
accusative singular	*Cé/óC(-m)	*Cé/óC(-m)
genitive singular	*Cé/óC-s	*CC-ós

The thematic stem type was a late innovation, with a thematic vowel *-o- originating from the hysterodynamic genitive singular form of athematic inflection, which had in pre-PIE the function of ergative. That is why there are o-stems but no e-stems and is suggested to be why thematic nouns show no ablaut or accentual mobility in inflection (for other theories on the origin of thematic vowel see Thematic vowel: Origin in nouns). The general points of departure to the Erlangen model are:

- Both models share (acro)static and proterodynamic patterns.
- The hysterokinetic and amphikinetic patterns are reconstructed only in the Erlangen model.
- The hysterodynamic model exists only in the Leiden model and represents an earlier stage of the hysterokinetic and amphikinetic patterns of the Erlangen model. The reconstruction of the paradigm is not based only on internal reconstruction. It is synchronically still attested in the Hittite paradigm of the word for "hand": keššar, kiššeran, kišraš. That is therefore one of the most archaic paradigms in PIE.
- The Leiden model describes a stage, Early PIE, that is relatively older than the Erlangen model.
- The Leiden model has a one-to-one correlation between the presence of the full grade vowel and the position of the accent, which indicates a historical connection between the two. At the stage of the Leiden model, there was only one phonemic vowel, as *e was always accented, and the new vowel, *o, was always unaccented. Both were therefore in complementary distribution.

== Heteroclitic stems ==
Some athematic noun stems have different final consonants in different cases and are termed heteroclitic stems. Most of the stems end in *-r- in the nominative and accusative singular, and in *-n- in the other cases. An example of such r/n-stems is the acrostatic neuter *wód-r̥ 'water', genitive *wéd-n̥-s. The suffixes *-mer/n-, *-ser/n-, *-ter/n- and *-wer/n- are also attested, as in the probably-proterokinetic *péh₂-wr̥ 'fire', gen. *ph₂-wén-s or similar. An l/n-stem is *séh₂-wl̥ or *seh₂-wōl 'sun', gen. *sh₂-wén-s or the like.

== Derivation ==
PIE had a number of ways to derive nominals from verbs or from other nominals. These included:

1. simply adding a nominal ending to a verbal root, for example *dómh₂s 'house' from *demh₂- 'build',
2. accent/ablaut alternations of existing nominals,
3. derivational prefixes (including reduplication) and suffixes added to verbal roots or nominal stems,
4. and combining lexical morphemes (compounding).

=== Accent/ablaut alternations ===
From athematic nouns, derivatives could be created by shifting the accent to the right and thus switching to another accent/ablaut class: acrostatic to proterokinetic or amphikinetic, proterokinetic to amphikinetic or hysterokinetic, and so on. Such derivations signified "possessing, associated with". An example is proterokinetic *bʰléǵʰ-mn̥ *bʰl̥ǵʰ-mén-s 'sacred formulation' (Vedic bráhmaṇ-), from which amphikinetic *bʰléǵʰ-mō(n), *bʰl̥ǵʰ-mn-és 'priest' (Vedic brahmáṇ-) was derived.

Another ablaut alternation is *ḱernes 'horned' from *ḱernos 'horn, roe'. Many PIE adjectives formed this way were subsequently nominalized in daughter languages.

Thematic nominals could also be derived by accent or ablaut changes. Leftward shift of the accent could turn an agentive word into a resultative one, for example *tomós 'sharp', but *tómos 'a slice' (from *tem- 'to cut'); *bʰorós 'carrier', but *bʰóros 'burden' (from *bʰer- 'carry'. A special type of ablaut alternation was vṛddhi derivation, which typically lengthened a vowel, signifying "of, belonging to, descended from".

=== Affixation ===
These are some of the nominal affixes found in Proto-Indo-European

- -o: forms action or agent nouns.
- -u: unproductive suffix of uncertain function. Only used in a few old nouns such as *gón-u 'knee' and *dór-u 'wood'.
- -it: marks elemental foodstuff such as *mél-it 'honey', *sép-it 'wheat' and *h₂élbʰ-it 'barley'.
- -men: forms abstractions. This is probably a reduced form of the noun *men-ti-s 'mind'.
- -ter: forms agentives ("-er").

=== Compounding ===
PIE had a number of possibilities to compound nouns. Endocentric or determinative compounds denote subclasses of their head (usually the second part), as in English "smalltalk" or "blackbird". Exocentric or possessive compounds, usually called bahuvrihis, denote something possessing something, as in "flatfoot = [somebody] having flat feet" or "redthroat = [a bird] with a red throat". This type was much more common in old Indo-European languages; some doubt the existence of determinative compounds in PIE altogether. Compounds consisting of a nominal plus a verb (akin to English "cowherd") were common; those of a verb plus a nominal ("pickpocket"), less so. Other parts of speech also occurred as first part of compounds, such as prepositions, numerals (*tri- from *tréyes 'three'), other particles (*n̥-, zero grade of *ne 'not', seen in English "un-", Latin "in-", Greek "a(n)-") and adjectives (*drḱ-h₂ḱru 'tear', literally 'bitter-eye').

== Adjectives ==
Adjectives in PIE generally have the same form as nouns, although when paradigms are gender-specific more than one may be combined to form an adjectival paradigm, which must be declined for gender as well as number and case. The main example of this is the o/eh₂-stem adjectives, which have masculine forms following masculine o-stems (*-os), feminine forms following eh₂-stems and neuter forms following neuter o-stems (*-om).

=== Caland-system adjectives ===
A number of adjectival roots form part of the Caland system, named after Dutch Indologist Willem Caland, who first formulated part of the system. The cognates derived from these roots in different daughter languages often do not agree in formation, but show certain characteristic properties: (Note: A comparison of such characteristic properties of derivatives of PIE's *-nt- suffix is available in Lowe (2011).)

- Adjectives are formed using zero-ablaut ro-stems, u-stems or nt-stems: *h₁rudʰ-ro- (zero grade of the root *h₁rewdʰ-) > Ancient Greek eruthrós 'red'; *h₂rǵ-ro- > *argrós > Ancient Greek argós 'white bright'.
- Adjectives are sometimes formed using i-stems, especially in the first part of a compound: Ancient Greek argi-kéraunos 'with bright lightning'.
- There are often corresponding stative verbs in *-eh₁: *h₁rudʰ-eh₁- > Latin rubeō 'to be red'.

=== Comparison ===
==== Comparative ====
- Suffixes *-yos- and *-tero-

The comparative form ("bigger, more beautiful") could be formed by replacing an adjective's suffix with *-yos-; the resulting word is amphikinetic: *meǵ-no- 'big' (Latin magnus) → *méǵ-yos- 'bigger' (Latin maior, maius), weak cases *meǵ-is-.

A second suffix, *-tero-, originally expressed contrast, as in Ancient Greek pó-tero-s 'which (of two)' or deksi-teró-s 'right (as opposed to left)'. It later attained comparative function. For example, the meaning of Ancient Greek sophṓteros ''wiser, the wiser one'' developed from 'the wise one (of the two)'. English far-ther also contains this suffix.

==== Superlative ====
- Suffixes *-m̥mo- / *-m̥h₂o- and *-isto- / *-isth₂o-

PIE probably expressed the superlative ("biggest, most beautiful") by adding a genitive plural noun to the adjective. Instead of 'the greatest of the gods', people said 'great of (=among) the gods'. Still, two suffixes have been reconstructed that have superlative meaning in daughter languages: one is *-m̥mo- or *-m̥h₂o-, the other *-isto- or *-isth₂o-, composed of the zero grade of the comparative suffix plus an additional syllable. They are generalisations of the ordinal numbers.

== Sample declensions ==
The following are example declensions of a number of different types of nouns, based on the reconstruction of Ringe (2006). The o-stems are thematic, and all others are considered athematic.

Static inflexions
		Acrostatic				Mesostatic	
		Lengthened / "Narten" Root noun	Root noun	s-stem n.	o-stem th. n.	o-stem th. m.	eh₂-stem (ā-stem) l-th. f.
Gloss		≡ moon (Note: Through an amphikinetic s-stem reformation. Kroonen (2013:365)) m.	> night f.	cloud n. (≡ "nebul(ous)") (Note: Through a Latin loan and a root extension.)	> work n.	> nest m.	grain f.
Singular	Nom.	**mḗh₁n̥s-(s) > *mḗh₁n̥s (Note: With degemination.)	*nókʷt-s	*nébʰ-os	*wérǵ-o-m	*nisd-ó-s	*dʰoHn-éh₂
Singular	Voc. (Note: Vocatives were normally deaccented (like every major words). However, they exhibited surface accentuation sentence-initially (topicalised) on their first recoverable syllable. Ringe (2006:22))	**mḗh₁n̥s-(s) > *mḗh₁n̥s	*nókʷt	*nébʰ-os	*wérǵ-o-m	*nisd-é (Note: The thematic vowel changes to *-e- in word-final position and before *h₂.)	*dʰoHn-[á] (Note: A sandhi rule deleted utterance-final laryngeals and vocatives were complete utterances. However, this applied after laryngeal-coloring rules but before lenthening ones. Summing it up, eh₂-stems' vocatives should have surfacd with short *[a], Ringe (2006:21) but the "recentness" of this stem type renders impossible to know if *a was already phonemicised.)
Singular	Acc.	*mḗh₁n̥s-m̥	*nókʷt-m̥	*nébʰ-os	*wérǵ-o-m	*nisd-ó-m	*dʰoHn-éh₂-m (-ā́m) (Note: Per Stang's law cf. Szemerényi note.)
Singular	Gen.	*méh₁n̥s-os	*nékʷt-s	*nébʰ-es-os	*wérǵ-o-syo	*nisd-ó-syo	*dʰoHn-éh₂-s
Singular	Abl.	*méh₁n̥s-os	*nékʷt-s	*nébʰ-es-os	*wérǵ-e-ad	*nisd-é-ad	*dʰoHn-éh₂-s
Singular	Dat.	*méh₁n̥s-ey	*nékʷt-ey	*nébʰ-es-ey	*wérǵ-o-ey	*nisd-ó-ey	*dʰoHn-éh₂-ey
Singular	Inst.	*méh₁n̥s-(e)h₁	*nékʷt-(e)h₁	*nébʰ-es-(e)h₁	*wérǵ-o-h₁	?	*dʰoHn-éh₂-(e)h₁
Singular	Loc. (Note: An endingless locative is reconstructed in addition to the ordinary locative singular in *-i, hereafter noted *(-i). In contrast to the other weak cases, it typically has full or lengthened grade of the stem.)	*méh₁n̥s-(i)	*nékʷt-(i)	*nébʰ-es-(i)	**wérǵ-e + -i > *wérǵ-e-y	**nisd-é + -i > *nisd-é-y	*dʰoHn-éh₂-(i)
Dual	Nom./Voc. /Acc.	*mḗh₁n̥s-h₁e	*nókʷt-h₁e	*nébʰ-es-ih₁	*wérǵ-o-y(h₁)	*nisd-ó-h₁	?
Plural	Nom./Voc.	*mḗh₁n̥s-es	*nókʷt-es	*nébʰ-ōs	*wérǵ-e-h₂	*nisd-ó-es	*dʰoHn-éh₂-es
Plural	Acc.	*mḗh₁n̥s-n̥s	*nókʷt-n̥s	*nébʰ-ōs	*wérǵ-e-h₂	*nisd-ó-ns	*dʰoHn-éh₂-ns (-ā́s)
Plural	Gen.	*méh₁n̥s-oHom	*nékʷt-oHom	*nébʰ-es-oHom	*wérǵ-o-oHom	*nisd-ó-oHom	*dʰoHn-éh₂-oHom
Plural	Abl./Dat.	*méh₁n̥s-mos	*nékʷt-m̥os	*nébʰ-es-mos	*wérǵ-o-(y)mos	*nisd-ó-(y)mos	*dʰoHn-éh₂-mos
Plural	Inst.	*méh₁n̥s-bʰi	*nékʷt-bʰi	*nébʰ-es-bʰi	*wérǵ-ōys	*nisd-ṓys	*dʰoHn-éh₂-bʰi
Plural	Loc.	**méh₁n̥s-su	*nékʷt-su	*nébʰ-es-u	*wérǵ-o-ysu	*nisd-ó-ysu	*dʰoHn-éh₂-su
Kinetic inflexions
		Proterokinetic					
		Old acrostatic u-stem n.	r/n-stem n.	n-stem n.	(t)u-stem m.	(t)i-stem f.	h₂-stem f.
Gloss		≡ tree (Note: Through a thematicised form. Kroonen (2013:522)) n.	> water n.	seed m. (> "semen") (Note: Through a Latin loan.)	taste m. (> "gust") (Note: Through an (old) French or Latin loan.)	thought f. (> mind)	woman f. (≡ queen) (Note: Through an i-stem : either a direct formation or a nominalised gerundive from an otherwise unsupported verb. Kroonen (2013:316–317) The more direct descendant is quean.)
Singular	Nom.	*dór-u	**wód-r̥-C (Note: Here, C stands for a continuant or a zero.) > *wód-r̥	**séh₁-mn̥-C > *séh₁-mn̥	*ǵéws-tu-s	*mén-ti-s	**gʷén-h₂-(s) > *gʷḗn
Singular	Voc.	*dór-u	**wód-r̥-C > *wód-r̥	**séh₁-mn̥-C > *séh₁-mn̥	*ǵéws-tu	*mén-ti	**gʷén-h₂-(s) > *gʷḗn
Singular	Acc.	*dór-u	**wód-r̥-C > *wód-r̥	**séh₁-mn̥-C > *séh₁-mn̥	*ǵéws-tu-m	*mén-ti-m	*gʷén-h₂-m̥
Singular	Gen./Abl.	*dr-éw-s	*ud-én-s	*sh₁-m̥én-s	*ǵus-téw-s	*mn̥-téy-s	*gʷn-éh₂-s
Singular	Dat.	*dr-éw-ey	*ud-én-ey	*sh₁-m̥én-ey	*ǵus-téw-ey	*mn̥-téy-ey	*gʷn-éh₂-ey
Singular	Inst.	*dr-ú-h₁	*ud-én-h₁	*sh₁-m̥én-h₁	*ǵus-tú-h₁	*mn̥-tí-h₁	*gʷn-éh₂-(e)h₁
Singular	Loc.	*dr-éw-(i)	*ud-én-(i)	*sh₁-mén-(i)	*ǵus-téw-(i)	**mn̥-téy-i > *mn̥-tḗy	*gʷn-éh₂-(i)
Dual	Nom./Voc. /Acc.	*dór-w-ih₁	Uncountable, take the old collective derivation as "equivalent"	*séh₁-mn̥-ih₁	*ǵéws-tu-h₁	*mén-ti-h₁	*gʷén-h₂-h₁e
Plural	Nom./Voc.	*dór-u-h₂	Uncountable, take the old collective derivation as "equivalent"	Uncountable, take the old collective derivation as "equivalent"	*ǵéws-tew-es	*mén-tey-es	*gʷén-h₂-es
Plural	Acc.	*dór-u-h₂	Uncountable, take the old collective derivation as "equivalent"	Uncountable, take the old collective derivation as "equivalent"	*ǵéws-tu-ns	*mén-ti-ns	*gʷén-h₂-n̥s
Plural	Gen.	*dr-éw-oHom	Uncountable, take the old collective derivation as "equivalent"	Uncountable, take the old collective derivation as "equivalent"	*ǵus-téw-oHom	*mn̥-téy-oHom	*gʷn-éh₂-oHom
Plural	Abl./Dat.	*dr-ú-mos	Uncountable, take the old collective derivation as "equivalent"	Uncountable, take the old collective derivation as "equivalent"	*ǵus-tú-mos	*mn̥-tí-mos	*gʷn-éh₂-mos
Plural	Inst.	*dr-ú-bʰi	Uncountable, take the old collective derivation as "equivalent"	Uncountable, take the old collective derivation as "equivalent"	*ǵus-tú-bʰi	*mn̥-tí-bʰi	*gʷn-éh₂-bʰi
Plural	Loc.	*dr-ú-su	Uncountable, take the old collective derivation as "equivalent"	Uncountable, take the old collective derivation as "equivalent"	*ǵus-tú-su	*mn̥-tí-su	*gʷn-éh₂-su
		Hysterokinetic					
		(n)t-stem	n-stem	e-ablauting n-stem		r-stem	h₂-stem f.
Gloss		> tooth m.	dog m. (> "cyn(ic)") (Note: Through a Greek loan.)	bull m. (> ox)	> bottom m.	> father m.	> tongue f.
Singular	Nom.	*h₃d-ónt-s	**ḱw-ón-s > *ḱw-ṓ	**uks-én-s > *uks-ḗn	**bʰudʰ-mén-s > *bʰudʰ-mḗn	**ph₂t-ér-s > *ph₂t-ḗr	*dn̥ǵʰw-éh₂-s
Singular	Voc.	*h₃d-ónt	*ḱú-on ?	*úks-en	*bʰúdʰ-men	*ph₂t-ér	*dń̥ǵʰw-eh₂
Singular	Acc.	*h₃d-ónt-m̥	*ḱw-ón-m̥	*uks-én-m̥	*bʰudʰ-mén-m̥	*ph₂t-ér-m̥	*dn̥ǵʰw-éh₂-m (-ā́m)
Singular	Gen./Abl.	*h₃d-n̥t-és (<-ś)	*ḱu-n-és (<-ś)	*uks-n-és (<-ś)	*bʰudʰ-m̥n-és (<-ś)	*ph₂t-r-és (<-ś)	*dn̥ǵʰu-h₂-és (<-ś)
Singular	Dat.	*h₃d-n̥t-éy	*ḱu-n-éy	*uks-n-éy	*bʰudʰ-m̥n-éy	*ph₂t-r-éy	*dn̥ǵʰu-h₂-éy
Singular	Inst.	*h₃d-n̥t-éh₁ (<-h́₁)	*ḱu-n-éh₁ (<-h́₁)	*uks-n-éh₁ (<-h́₁)	*bʰudʰ-m̥n-éh₁ (<-h́₁)	*ph₂t-r-éh₁ (<-h́₁)	*dn̥ǵʰu-h₂-éh₁ (<-h́₁)
Singular	Loc.	*h₃d-ónt-(i)	*ḱw-ón-(i)	*uks-én-(i)	*bʰudʰ-mén-(i)	*ph₂t-ér-(i)	*dn̥ǵʰw-éh₂-(i)
Dual	Nom./Voc. /Acc.	*h₃d-ónt-h₁e	*ḱw-ón-h₁e	*uks-én-h₁e	*bʰudʰ-mén-h₁e	*ph₂t-ér-h₁e	*dn̥ǵʰw-éh₂-h₁e
Plural	Nom./Voc.	*h₃d-ónt-es	*ḱw-ón-es	*uks-én-es	*bʰudʰ-mén-es	*ph₂t-ér-es	*dn̥ǵʰw-éh₂-es
Plural	Acc.	*h₃d-ónt-n̥s	*ḱw-ón-n̥s	*uks-én-n̥s	*bʰudʰ-mén-n̥s	*ph₂t-ér-n̥s	*dn̥ǵʰw-éh₂-ns (-ā́s)
Plural	Gen.	*h₃d-n̥t-óHom	*ḱu-n-óHom	*uks-n-óHom	*bʰudʰ-m̥n-óHom	*ph₂t-r-óHom	*dn̥ǵʰu-h₂-óHom
Plural	Abl./Dat.	*h₃d-n̥t-mós	*ḱw-n̥-mós	*uks-n̥-mós	*bʰudʰ-m̥n-mós	*ph₂t-r̥-mós	*dn̥ǵʰu-h₂-mós
Plural	Inst.	*h₃d-n̥t-bʰí	*ḱw-n̥-bʰí	*uks-n̥-bʰí	*bʰudʰ-m̥n-bʰí	*ph₂t-r̥-bʰí	*dn̥ǵʰu-h₂-bʰí
Plural	Loc.	*h₃d-n̥t-sú	*ḱw-n̥-sú	*uks-n̥-sú	*bʰudʰ-m̥n-sú	*ph₂t-r̥-sú	*dn̥ǵʰu-h₂-sú
		Amphikintetic					
		Old acrostatic (Note: Nomenclatural analogy with *dóru, could be a compensation for the absence of resonant as well. Ringe (2006:45)) root noun	collective r/n-stem n.	collective n-stem n.	n-stem	m-stem	s-stem
Gloss		> foot m.	waters n.	seeds (Note: Taken as a group. Ex : "Those seeds are bad for you" or "Seeds can be cultivated".) n.	lake m. (> "limn(ic)")	(the) Earth f. (> "chthon(ic)")	blood (gore) n. (> "(pan)creas")
Singular
Singular	Nom.	*pṓd-s (Note: Morphologisation of Szemerényi's law. Ringe (2006:21))	**wéd-or-C > *wéd-ōr	**séh₁-mon-C > *séh₁-mō	**léy-mon-s > *léy-mō	**dʰéǵʰ-om-s > *dʰéǵʰ-ōm	**kréwh₂-s-C > *kréwh₂-s
Singular	Voc.	*pód	**wéd-or-C > *wéd-ōr	**séh₁-mon-C > *séh₁-mō	*léy-mon	*dʰéǵʰ-om	**kréwh₂-s-C > *kréwh₂-s
Singular	Acc.	*pód-m̥	**wéd-or-C > *wéd-ōr	**séh₁-mon-C > *séh₁-mō	*léy-mon-m̥	**dʰéǵʰ-om-m > *dʰéǵʰ-ōm	**kréwh₂-s-C > *kréwh₂-s
Singular	Gen./Abl.	*ped-és (<-ś)	*ud-n-és (<-ś)	*sh₁-m̥n-és (<-ś)	*li-mn-és (<-ś)	*ǵʰ-m-és (Note: With cluster simplification (**dʰǵʰm)) (<-ś)	*kruh₂-s-és (<-ś)
Singular	Dat.	*ped-éy	*ud-n-éy	*sh₁-m̥n-éy	*li-mn-éy	*ǵʰ-m-éy	*kruh₂-s-éy
Singular	Inst.	*ped-éh₁ (<-h́₁)	*ud-n-éh₁ (<-h́₁)	*sh₁-m̥n-éh₁ (<-h́₁)	*li-mn-éh₁ (<-h́₁)	*ǵʰ-m-éh₁ (<-h́₁)	*kruh₂-s-éh₁ (<-h́₁)
Singular	Loc.	*péd-(i)	*ud-én-(i)	*sh₁-mén-(i)	*li-mén-(i)	*ǵʰdʰ-ém-(i) > *ǵʰdʰs-ém-(i) (Note: Thorn cluster. Following Schindler (1991), they surfaced as affricated. Ringe (2006:19))	*kruh₂-és-(i)
Dual	Nom./Voc. /Acc.	*pód-h₁e	Uncountable	Uncountable	*léy-mon-h₁e	Uncountable	Uncountable, but takes collective from the same accent class.
Plural	Nom./Voc.	*pód-es	Uncountable	Uncountable	*léy-mon-es	Uncountable	*kréwh₂-ōs
Plural	Acc.	*pód-n̥s	Uncountable	Uncountable	*léy-mon-n̥s	Uncountable	*kréwh₂-ōs
Plural	Gen.	*ped-óHom	Uncountable	Uncountable	*li-mn-óHom	Uncountable	*kruh₂-s-és (<-ś)
Plural	Abl.	*ped-mós	Uncountable	Uncountable	*li-mn̥-mós	Uncountable	*kruh₂-s-és (<-ś)
Plural	Dat.	*ped-mós	Uncountable	Uncountable	*li-mn̥-mós	Uncountable	*kruh₂-s-éy
Plural	Inst.	*ped-bʰí	Uncountable	Uncountable	*li-mn̥-bʰí	Uncountable	*kruh₂-s-éh₁ (<-h́₁)
Plural	Loc.	*ped-sú	Uncountable	Uncountable	*li-mn̥-sú	Uncountable	*kruh₂-és-(i)

== Bibliography ==
- Beekes, Robert S.P.; de Vaan, Michiel (2011). Comparative Indo-European Linguistics: An Introduction (2nd ed.). Amsterdam/Philadelphia: John Benjamins Publishing Company. ISBN 978-90-272-1186-6. (PB) / ISBN 978 90 272 1185 9 (HB) (alk. paper) / ISBN 978 90 272 8500 3 (EB)
- Beekes, Robert S.P. (1985). The Origins of the Indo-European Nominal Inflection. Innsbruck. ISBN 3-85124-578-4.
- Buck, Carl Darling (1933). Comparative Grammar of Greek and Latin. University of Chicago Press. ISBN 0-226-07931-7.
- Fortson, Benjamin W., IV (2004). Indo-European Language and Culture. Blackwell Publishing. ISBN 1-4051-0316-7.
- Jasanoff, Jay (2009), "*-bhi, *-bhis, *-ōis: following the trail of the PIE instrumental plural" (PDF), in Jens Elmegård Rasmussen; Thomas Olander (eds.), Internal Reconstruction in Indo-European: Methods, Results, and Problems (= Copenhagen Studies in Indo-European), vol. 3, Copenhagen: Museum Tusculanum Press, pp. 137–149, ISBN 978-8-763-50785-1, archived (PDF) from the original on 2025-07-01
- Jasanoff, Jay (2017). The Prehistory of the Balto-Slavic Accent. Leiden: Brill. ISBN 978-90-04-34609-3.
- Kloekhorst, Alwin (2008), Etymological Dictionary of the Hittite Inherited Lexicon, Leiden: Brill
- Kloekhorst, Alwin (2013). Keydana, Götz; Olander, Thomas; Widmer, Paul (eds.). "Indo-European nominal ablaut patterns: The Anatolian evidence" (PDF). Indo-European Accent and Ablaut. Museum Tusculanum Press: 107–128. ISBN 978-87-635-4043-8.
- Kroonen, Guus (2013), Etymological Dictionary of Proto-Germanic, Leiden: Brill, ISBN 978-90-0418-340-7
- Lowe, John J. (2011). Caland Adjectives and Participles in Sanskrit and Proto-Indo-European (PDF). (handout) 23rd Annual UCLA Indo-European Conference.
- Luraghi, Silvia (2009). "The origin of the feminine gender in PIE. An old problem in a new perspective" (PDF). In Bubenik, V.; Hewson, J.; Rose, S. (eds.). Grammatical change in Indo-European languages. John Benjamins. ISBN 978-90-272-4821-3.
- Mallory, J. P.; Adams, Douglas Q., eds. (1997). "Proto-Indo-European". Encyclopedia of Indo-European Culture. Taylor & Francis.
- Mallory, J.P.; Adams, D.Q. (2006). The Oxford introduction to Proto-Indo-European and the Proto-Indo-European world. Oxford University Press. ISBN 0-19-929668-5.
- Meier-Brügger, Michael; Fritz, Matthias; Mayrhofer, Manfred (2003). Indo-European Linguistics. Berlin; New York: Walter de Gruyter. ISBN 3-11-017433-2.
- Ringe, Don (2006). From Proto-Indo-European to Proto-Germanic. A Linguistic History of English. Vol. 1 (1st ed.). New York City: Oxford University Press. ISBN 978-0-19-928413-9. OCLC 64554645. OL 7405151M. Wikidata Q131605459.
- Rix, Helmut; Kümmel, Martin (2001). Lexikon der indogermanischen Verben [Lexicon of the Indo-European Verbs] (in German) (2nd ed.). Dr. Ludwig Reichert Verlag. ISBN 3-89500-219-4.
- Sihler, Andrew L. (1995). New Comparative Grammar of Greek and Latin. Oxford University Press. ISBN 0-19-508345-8.
- Whitney, William Dwight (1889) [1879]. Sanskrit Grammar. Harvard University Press. ISBN 0-486-43136-3.
- Wodtko, Dagmar S.; Irslinger, Britta; Schneider, Carolin (2008). Nomina im Indogermanischen Lexikon [Nominals in the Indo-European Lexicon] (in German). Universitätsverlag Winter. ISBN 978-3-8253-5359-9.
- Woodard, Roger D. (2008). The Ancient Languages of Asia Minor. Cambridge University Press. ISBN 978-0-521-68496-5.
