= Proto-Indo-European accent =

Pitch accent system of the proto-Indo-European language

Proto-Indo-European accent refers to the theoretical accentual (tonal) system of the hypothetical Proto-Indo-European language.

== Description ==
Proto-Indo-European (PIE) is usually reconstructed as having a "pitch accent" system where one syllable of each phonological word had a higher pitch than the other syllables. The placement of the Proto-Indo-European accent was not predictable from a word's phonological form.

PIE accent was free, meaning it could stand on any syllable in a word, a feature that is preserved in the Vedic Sanskrit accent system (the later Classical Sanskrit had a predictable accent):

- PIE *bʰéromh₁nos 'carried' > Vedic bháramāṇas
- PIE *dʰoréyeti 'holds' > Vedic dhāráyati
- PIE *nemesyéti 'worships' > Vedic namasyáti
- PIE *h₁rudʰrós 'red' > Vedic rudhirás

In many descendants, the original free accent system was replaced with a system of bound accent. Free accent is preserved in Vedic Sanskrit (of modern Indo-Iranian languages, according to some and Pashto), Hellenic, Balto-Slavic and Anatolian. Free accent was retained long enough in pre-Proto-Germanic for Verner's Law to be dependent on it, but later, stress was shifted in Proto-Germanic to the first syllable of the word.

In inflected words, such as nouns and verbs, the accent could either remain on the same syllable, or change position between different inflected forms. Different paradigms of accentuation are associated with particular morphological formations.

Words where the accent remains on the same syllable are said to have fixed accent. This includes thematic nouns (nouns whose inflected stem ends in a thematic vowel), and also a minority of athematic nouns. Nouns with fixed accent are divided into barytones if they are accented on the first syllable and oxytones if they are accented on the last syllable:

- PIE barytone *wĺ̥kʷos 'wolf' > Sanskrit nom. sg. vṛ́kas, gen. sg. vṛ́kasya, nom. pl. vṛ́kās
- PIE oxytone *suHnús 'son' > Sanskrit nom. sg. sūnús, gen. sg. sūnós, nom. pl. sūnávas

Words where the position of the accent changes throughout the inflectional paradigm are said to have mobile accent. This category includes most athematic nouns. This quality persisted in Vedic Sanskrit and Ancient Greek, as in the declension of the nouns descended from PIE *pṓds 'foot, step':

- PIE nom. sg. *pṓds > Sanskrit pā́t, Ancient Greek πούς
- PIE gen. sg. *pedés > Sanskrit padás, Ancient Greek ποδός
- PIE acc. sg. *pódm̥ > Sanskrit pā́dam, Ancient Greek πόδᾰ,

or in the conjugation of athematic verbs (compare Sanskrit root present first-person sg. émi, first-person plural imás).

=== Unaccented words ===
Some PIE lexical categories could be unaccented (clitics). These are chiefly particles (PIE *-kʷe 'and' > Vedic -ca, Latin que, Ancient Greek τε) and some forms of pronouns (PIE *moy 'to me' > Vedic me).

Vedic Sanskrit evidence also indicates that the Proto-Indo-European verb could be unaccented in some syntactical conditions, such as in finite position in the main clause (but not sentence-initially, where verbs would bear whatever accent they would have borne in subordinate clauses). The same is true of vocatives, which would be deaccented unless they appeared sentence-initially.

== Reflexes ==
The accent system of Vedic Sanskrit seems to reflect the position of the original PIE accent fairly faithfully. Avestan manuscripts do not have written accent, but we know indirectly that at some period the free PIE accent was preserved (e.g. Avestan *r is devoiced yielding -hr- before voiceless stops and after the accent — if the accent was not on the preceding syllable, *r is not devoiced (Note: Compare e.g. Avestan vəhrka- 'wolf' with devoicing, as opposed to Vedic vṛ́kas, Ancient Greek λύκος, but mərəta- 'dead' without devoicing, as opposed to Vedic mṛtás, Ancient Greek βροτός.)).

Ancient Greek also preserves the free PIE accent in its nouns (see Ancient Greek accent), but with limitations that prevent the accent from being positioned farther than the third syllable from the end (next from the end if the last vowel was long). However, Greek is almost completely worthless for reconstructing the PIE accent in verbs, because (other than in a few cases) it is consistently positioned as close to the start as the rules allow.

The PIE accent was lost in Proto-Germanic, but its position is attested indirectly in Germanic languages because of accent-sensitive sound changes that applied in pre-Proto-Germanic, such as Verner's law.

Anatolian languages show traces of the old PIE accent in the lengthening of the formerly accented syllable. Compare:

- PIE *dóru 'tree; wood' > Hittite, Luwian tāru
- PIE *wódr̥ 'water' > Hittite wātar, but PIE *wedṓr 'waters' (collective) > Hittite widār

Some Balto-Slavic languages also retain traces of the free PIE accent. For the reconstruction of the Proto-Balto-Slavic accent, the most important evidence comes from Lithuanian, from Latvian (traditionally Lithuanian is thought as more relevant, but that role is being increasingly being taken over by Latvian), and from some Slavic languages, especially Western South Slavic languages and their archaic dialects. The Balto-Slavic accent is continued in the Proto-Slavic accent. Accentual alternations in inflectional paradigms (both verbal and nominal) are also retained in Balto-Slavic. It used to be held that Balto-Slavic has an innovative accentual system, but nowadays, according to some researchers, Balto-Slavic is taking a pivotal role in the reconstruction of the PIE accent (see below).

== Interpretation ==
According to traditional reconstructions, the following can be said of the PIE accentual system:

- PIE thematic nominals all had fixed accent (the same syllable was accented in all of the word's inflected forms). Thematic verbal stems appear to have also had fixed accent for the most part; however, this is less clear in the case of simple thematic presents.
- The majority of athematic nominals and verb stems had alternating accent, which surfaced to the left in the nominative and accusative (for nouns) or the active singular (for verbs), and to the right in other forms. Alternating accent followed various specific patterns. A minority of athematic nominals and verb stems had fixed accent, which usually fell on the root.

Per Ringe (2006), these patterns can be explained as resulting from a system where both stems and endings can potentially bear an underlying accent. In a word with multiple underlying accents, the leftmost underlying accent is realized as the surface accent. In a word with no underlying accent, the leftmost syllable receives the surface accent.

== Alternative theories ==
Traditionally the PIE accent has been reconstructed in a straightforward way, by the comparison of Vedic, Ancient Greek and Germanic; e.g. PIE *ph₂tḗr 'father' from Sanskrit pitā́, Ancient Greek πατήρ, Gothic fadar. When the position of the accent matched in these languages, that was the accent reconstructed for "PIE proper". It was taken for granted that the Vedic accent was the most archaic and the evidence of Vedic could be used to resolve all the potentially problematic cases.

It was shown, however, by Vladislav Illich-Svitych in 1963 that the Balto-Slavic accent does not match the presupposed PIE accent reconstructed on the basis of Vedic and Ancient Greek — the Greek-Vedic barytones correspond to Balto-Slavic fixed paradigms (or barytone, or 1 accent paradigm), and Greek-Vedic oxytones correspond to Balto-Slavic mobile paradigms (or 2 accent paradigm, with orthotonic word-forms and forms-enclinomena). Moreover, in about a quarter of all cognate Vedic and Ancient Greek etymons accents do not match at all; e.g.

- PIE *h₂éǵros 'field' > Ancient Greek ἀγρός : Vedic ájras
- PIE *swéḱuros 'father-in-law' > Ancient Greek ἑκυρός : Vedic śváśuras
- PIE *kʷóteros 'which' > Ancient Greek πότερος : Vedic katarás

=== Valence theory ===
In 1973 (an early version of the hypothesis was presented in 1962), the Moscow accentological school, headed by linguists Vladimir Dybo and Sergei Nikolaev, reconstructed the PIE accentual system as a system of two tones or valences: + (dominant) and − (recessive). Proto-Indo-European would thus not have, as is usually reconstructed, a system of free accent such as is found in Vedic, but instead every morpheme would be inherently dominant or recessive, and the position of the accent would be later determined in various ways in the various daughter languages (depending on the combinations of (+) and (−) morphemes), so that Vedic would certainly not be the most archaic language. Many correspondences among IE languages, as well as certain phenomena in individual daughters dependent on PIE tones, should corroborate this interpretation. (Note: For example, the problem of secondary reflexes in Italo-Celtic of PIE *R̥H of an, ar, al (there are no examples for *am) beside the usual mā, nā, rā, lā that are usually reconstructed. According to Dybo, such dual reflexes are based on the old opposition of two PIE tones; the reflexes of type Rā match the Balto-Slavic fixed accent paradigm, whereas the reflexes of type aR match the Balto-Slavic mobile accent paradigm.)

Dybo lists several shortcomings in the traditional approach to the reconstruction of PIE accent. (Note: Cited after) Amongst others, incorrect belief in the direct connection between the PIE accent and ablaut, which in fact does not explain the position of PIE accent at all. Usually, for example, it is thought that zero-grade should be unaccented, but that is evidently not valid for PIE (e.g. *wĺ̥kʷos 'wolf', *septḿ̥ 'seven' etc.) according to the traditional reconstruction. Furthermore, Dybo claims that there is no phonological, semantic or morphological reason whatsoever for the classification of certain word to a certain accentual type, i.e. the traditional model cannot explain why Vedic vṛ́kas 'wolf' is barytone and Vedic devás 'deity' is oxytone. According to Dybo, such discrepancies can only be explained by presupposing lexical tone in PIE.

== See also ==
- Proto-Indo-European nominals § Athematic accent/ablaut classes

== Sources ==
- Ringe, Don (2006). From Proto-Indo-European to Proto-Germanic (PDF). New York: Oxford University Press. ISBN 978-0-19-928413-9. OCLC 64554645. OL 7405151M.
- Dybo, V. A. (1981). Ivanov, V. V. (ed.). Славянская акцентология: Опыт реконструкции системы акцентных парадигм в праславянском (PDF) (in Russian). Moscow: Nauka.
- Kapović, Mate (2008). Uvod u indoeuropsku lingvistiku (in Croatian). Zagreb: Matica hrvatska. ISBN 978-953-150-847-6.
- Probert, Philomen (2006). Ancient Greek Accentuation: Synchronic Patterns, Frequency Effects, and Prehistory. Oxford University Press.
- Nikolaev, S. L. (1989). "The Balto-Slavic Accentuation System and its Indo-European Origins" (PDF). Historical Accentology and the Comparative Method (in Russian). Moscow: Nauka: 46–109.
- Sukač, Roman, Introduction to Proto-Indo-European and Balto-Slavic Accentology. Newcastle upon Tyne: Cambridge Scholars Publishing, 2013.
- Starostin, S. A.; Dybo, V. A.; Nikolaev, S. L. (1978). "A tonological hypothesis on the origin of paradigmatic accent systems" (PDF). Estonian Papers in Phonetics. Tallinn: 16–20.
