= Vedic accent =

Sanskrit language feature

The pitch accent of Vedic Sanskrit, or Vedic accent (Vedic: स्वराः svarāḥ) for brevity, is traditionally divided by Sanskrit grammarians into three qualities, udātta उदात्त "raised" (acute accent, high pitch), anudātta अनुदात्त "not raised" (unstressed, or low pitch, grave accent) and svarita स्वरित "sounded" (high falling pitch, corresponds to the Greek circumflex accent). It is most similar to the pitch-accent system of modern-day Japanese.

== Accents ==
In Vedic Sanskrit, most of the words have one accented syllable, which is traditionally called udātta ("raised") and written with an acute mark ⟨◌́⟩ in the transcription. The position of that accent in inherited words generally reflects the position of Proto-Indo-European accent, which means it was free and so not phonologically predictable from the shape of the word. Some words (finite verbs of main clauses, vocatives that do not occur sentence initially, and certain pronouns and particles) do not have an accented syllable, consisting entirely of unaccented syllables.

Unaccented syllables are called anudātta ("not raised") and are not marked in the transcription. Phonetically, accented Rigvedic syllable was characterized by height (rather than prominence) as a "high tone", immediately falling in the next syllable. The falling tone in the post-tonic syllable is called svarita ("sounded"). For example, in the first pada of the Rigveda, the transliteration

agním īḷe puróhitaṃ अ॒ग्निम् ईळे पु॒रोहि॑तं (classical: अग्निम् ईडे पुरोहितं)
"Agni I praise, the high priest."

means that the eight syllables have an intonation of

A-U-S-A-A-U-S-A (where A=anudātta, U=udātta, S=svarita),

or iconically,

_¯\__¯\_

īḷe ईळे (classical: ईडे) is a finite verb and thus has no udātta, but its first syllable is svarita because the previous syllable is udātta. Vedic meter is independent of Vedic accent and exclusively determined by syllable weight, so that metrically, the pada reads as

-.--.-.x (the second half-pada is iambic).

When the Vedas were composed, svarita was not phonologically relevant. However, linguistic changes in oral transmission of the samhita before it was written down, mostly by the loss of syllabicity of high vowels when followed by a vowel, the tone has become relevant and is called an independent svarita. In transcription, it is written as a grave mark ⟨◌̀⟩. Such svarita may follow an anudātta. For example, in RV 1.10.8c,

jéṣaḥ súvarvatīr apá जेषः॑ सुव॑र्वतीर् अ॒प
U-S-U-S-A-A-A-U
¯\¯\___¯

became

jéṣaḥ svàrvatīr apá जेषः॑ स्व॑र्वतीर् अ॒प
U-S-S-A-A-A-U
¯\\___¯

Independent svarita is caused by sandhi of adjacent vowels. There are four variants of it:

- jātya (= "innate") (from changes within a word, as in kvà for kúa, as in the example above (u becomes v before a vowel)
- kṣaipra (= "caused by quickness") (u becoming v or i becoming y where two words meet, as in vy-ā̀pta for ví-āpta) (i becomes y before a vowel)
- praśliṣṭa (= "coalescence") (vowel contraction where two words meet, as in divī̀va for diví-iva)
- abhinihita (= "close contact") (prodelision with avagraha, where two words meet, as in tè-'bruvan for té-abruvan).

Independent svarita occurs about 1300 times in the Rigveda, or in about 5% of padas.

== Notation ==
In Latin script transcription, udātta is marked with an acute accent, independent svarita is marked with a grave accent, and other syllables are unaccented, and not marked.

In Devanagari editions of the Rigveda samhita:

- svarita is marked with a small upright stroke above a syllable: ◌॑ (Unicode: U+0951).
- anudātta is marked.
  - If it is right before an udātta or an independent svarita, it is marked with a horizontal line below the syllable: ◌॒ (Unicode: U+0952).
  - If the first syllable in a pada is anudātta, that syllable and all following syllables that are anudātta are marked with the horizontal line up to but not including the first syllable not an anudātta.
- If an independent svarita syllable is right before an udātta syllable, instead of putting the anudātta mark and the svarita mark on the same syllable, a numeral 1 (१) (if the svarita vowel is short) or a numeral 3 (३) (if the svarita vowel is long) is written between the syllables in question, and the numeral bears both the svarita mark and the anudātta mark: अ॒प्सु (apsú) + अ॒न्तः (antáḥ) → अ॒प्स्व१॒॑न्तः (apsvà(1)ntáḥ), or क्व॑ (kvà) + इ॒दानीं॑ (idā́nīṃ) → क्वे३॒॑दानीं॑ (kvè(3)dā́nīṃ)
- All other syllables are unmarked.

== See also ==
- Proto-Indo-European accent
- Pitch-accent language
- Mobile accent in Slavic
- Shiksha
- Vedic chant
