= Heteroclite =

== See also ==
- Proto-Indo-European noun: Heteroclitic stems
