= Proto-Indo-European root word =

A Proto-Indo-European (PIE) root word may be:

- Proto-Indo-European root noun
- Root aspect (root present and root aorist) in a Proto-Indo-European verb

== See also ==
- Proto-Indo-European root
