= Narten present =

Proposed inflectional class of the Proto-Indo-European verb

Narten present is a proposed inflectional class of the Proto-Indo-European verb, named after the Indo-Iranianist Johanna Narten who posited its existence in 1968. It is characterized by accent on the root in all of the person-number forms.

Roots having Narten presents always possess a surface accent, having a lengthened grade R(ḗ) in the singular active, and a full-grade R(é) in the rest of the active forms, as well as the mediopassive. The proposed examples of roots having such acrostatic presents include the following:

*h₁ḗd- ~ h₁éd- "to eat"
- h₁ḗh₂gʷʰ- ~ *h₁éh₂gʷʰ- "to drink"
- ḱḗHs- ~ *ḱéHs- "to instruct"
- dḗHḱ- ~ *déHḱ- "to honor"
- wḗḱ- ~ *wéḱ- "to ask, demand"
- wḗh₂- ~ *wéh₂- "to turn"

Narten present in the PIE root *stew- "to praise; declare"
person-number-tense	Sanskrit	Ancient Greek	PIE	Root form
3rd-person singular active	stáuti	-	*stḗw-ti	R(ḗ), i.e., strong
3rd-person-singular-middle	stáve	στεύται (steútai)	*stéw-(t)oy	R(é), i.e., weak

These forms are best reflected in Indo-Iranian and Hittite, with relics surviving in other languages, particularly in the root "to eat".

== Narten roots ==
In 1994 Jochem Schindler suggested the existence of what is called Narten roots – roots exhibiting a systematic *R(ḗ) ~ *R(é) ablaut in both nominal and verbal derivations, as opposed to the more common R(e) ~ R(Ø) pattern. These roots always carried a surface accent, and such ablaut is called more generally Narten ablaut. The other roots would then be non-Narten roots, exhibiting the R(e) ~ R(Ø) ablaut and allowing the accent to move away from the root. However, the linguist Michiel de Vaan reviewed the Avestan words cited in support of Schindler's theory, concluding that none of the adduced Avestan forms [remain] as trustworthy evidence for PIE 'upgraded' ablaut." Certain terms such as the noun *h₃rḗǵs, which exists beside the Narten verb *h₃rḗǵ-ti (whence Sanskrit rā́ṣṭi), have been cited in support of the existence of so-called Narten roots. However, the philologist Michael Weiss suggests that these nominal formations with Narten-ablaut were perhaps remodeled analogically after the verb, a phenomenon that—according to the linguist H. Craig Melchert—is not unusual for Indo-European languages. According to the linguist Melanie Malzahn, the presumption of analogically innovated lengthened grades can help explain the development of certain Tocharian terms, such as yesti ("piece of cloth"), which—according to Malzahn—perhaps reflects earlier pre-Proto-Tocharian *wḗstoy, which itself perhaps underwent influence from the Narten verb *wḗsti ~ *wésn̥ti. Though, Malzahn does not consider these terms sufficient evidence for the existence of "Narten roots," but instead merely reflective of an occasional analogical process.

It has also been shown that verbal roots exhibiting Narten ablaut occur in the same morphophonological environments as the roots with mobile accentuation and, furthermore, that nominal stems exhibiting acrostatic Narten ablaut *R(ḗ) ~ *R(é) occur in the same morphophonological environments as roots undergoing the more usual R(ó) ~ R(é) type. This insight has led to the development of modern theories regarding the relation of PIE accent, ablaut and the resulting ablaut classes: all roots, suffixes and inflectional endings (desinences) can be inherently "accented" or not, and the surfacing stress (i.e. the accent of the PIE word) falls on only one syllable, depending on the interplay of underlying accentuation of the combining morphemes.

== Function ==
Melchert argues that Narten verbs were actually characterized presents expressing a unique lexical aspect that existed alongside ordinary root presents. In support of this theory, Melchert notes the existence of Hittite ú-e-ek-zi ("to demand"), which perhaps reflects a Narten verb *wḗḱti, whereas a Sanskrit form váṣṭi ("to wish") derives from *wéḱti, a separate athematic present belonging to the same root. Regarding this particular example, Melchert argues that the Hittite and Sanskrit verbs showcase distinct semantics, with the Hittite form exclusively expressing the eventive meaning "to desire," whereas the Sanskrit form displays the stative meaning "to wish." However, the etymology of the Hittite word is not uncontroversial: Kloekhorst alternatively opts to derive the form from the same original root present as Sanskrit, though this theory is rejected by Melchert. Regarding the semantics of the Hittite term, Melchert proposes that the original Narten verb expressed an inceptive meaning "to initiate a wish," which evolved into "to demand," in the same fashion as English want (i.e. in statements such as "I want it").

The linguist Martin Kümmel suggests that the Narten-type perhaps formed imperfective verbs from root aorists, as there are Narten presents such as *dḗḱti (see Sanskrit dā́ṣṭi) that may have coexisted alongside aorists such as *déḱt (see Ancient Greek δέκτο, “dékto”). However, regarding this particular example, Beekes alternatively reconstructs an original reduplicated present stem *dédḱ- as the source of the Sanskrit forms, thereby rejecting the existence of an original Narten-type verb. Kümmel argues that the Narten verbs displayed a durative value in contrast to the telic value of the aorists, as indicated by forms such as *tḗtḱti ("to be creating"), which belongs to the root *tetḱ- ("to create, craft"). Alternatively, the linguists Petr Kocharov and Andrey Shatskov argue that Narten verbs formed causative verbs from the intransitive equivalents of transitive roots. In support of this theory, they cite formations such Sanskrit dā́ṣṭi, which derives from the Narten form *dḗḱ-ti, itself from the root *deḱ- ("to notice"). The intransitive counterpart of the original root sense would have been something such as "to become noticed/noticeable," the causative of which would have been "to make noticed/noticeable," whence perhaps the ultimate Sanskrit sense of "to venerate."

== Internal reconstruction ==
Narten presents were possibly archaic within Indo-European, as the class is attested in word equations between ancient Indo-European languages, such as Hittite ú-e-eš-ta, Ancient Greek εἷμαι (heîmai), and Sanskrit váste, all of which reflect a Proto-Indo-European deponent Narten mediopassive present *wéstor. However, Kocharov and Shatskov argue that a more recent date for the creation of the Narten-type is evidenced by the limited productivity of the verbal class, which is largely confined to a select few Indo-European branches, such as Indo-Iranian.

Regarding the origin of the type within IE, Kocharov and Shatskov propose that Proto-Indo-European originally marked the default meaning of a verb with the full-grade in either the active or middle singular. Thus, as they argue, a mediopassive verb such as *ḱéytor ("to be lying flat") formed a present with a full grade in the singular, while an active verb such as *h₁éyti contained the full grade in the active singular. Within this theory, a verb with a default active transitive meaning could form an intransitive mediopassive counterpart marked by the zero-grade in the singular. Thus, the active verb *mléwHti ("to say") exists in contrast to the intransitive mediopassive form *mluHtór ("to be called"). Essentially, this theory maintains that, for active verbs, the ablaut alternation between full grade in the active singular and the zero-grade in the mediopassive singular encoded a shift in transitivity. Ultimately, Kocharov and Shatskov suggest that the Narten-class was back-formed the aforementioned full grade mediopassive terms and acquired the *ḗ ~ é ablaut by analogy to the pattern of active transitive verbs. Alternatively, these full grade mediopassive terms have been interpreted as merely the middle forms of a Narten verb.

Narten-type ablaut with a lengthened-grade singular and a full grade elsewhere is speculated to have been the original form of the Proto-Indo-European s-aorist, which had the root in the lengthened e-grade in Indo-Iranian, Italic and Slavic, but in the full-grade in Greek and the Indo-Iranian middle.

Proto-Indo-European long-vowel preterites with */ē/ in the root are according to some originally imperfects of Narten presents, which explains the lengthened grade.

== Acceptance and criticism ==
The existence of Narten roots has been disputed in recent years. According to Kümmel (1998) the lengthened grade stem in the singular was formed complementary to root aorist, replacing the secondary endings by primary endings and changing the ablaut vowel. de Vaan (2004) analyzes the evidence collected by Schindler and Narten on acrostatic inflection in Avestan and PIE and concludes that "the concept of 'Narten' roots can be abandoned altogether.". On the other hand, Lexikon der indogermanischen Verben classifies Narten roots under the type (1b) "acrodynamic present", reconstructing in total 52 PIE roots belonging to this inflectional class, of which 32 are marked as "certain" and 20 as "uncertain".

== See also ==
- Proto-Indo-European language
- Proto-Indo-European verbs
