= Shloka =

Sanskrit verse in Anustubh metre

A shloka of Krishna recited by a devotee

Shloka or śloka (Sanskrit: श्लोक śloka, from the root श्रु śru, lit. 'hear') in a broader sense, according to Monier-Williams's dictionary, is "any verse or stanza; a proverb, saying"; but in particular it refers to the 32-syllable verse, derived from the Vedic anuṣṭubh metre, used in the Bhagavad Gita and many other works of classical Sanskrit literature.

In its usual form it consists of four pādas or quarter-verses, of eight syllables each, or (according to an alternative analysis) of two half-verses of 16 syllables each. The metre is similar to the Vedic anuṣṭubh metre, but with stricter rules.

The śloka is the basis for Indian epic poetry, and may be considered the Indian verse form par excellence, occurring as it does far more frequently than any other metre in classical Sanskrit poetry. The śloka is the verse-form generally used in the Mahabharata, the Ramayana, the Puranas, Smritis, and the scientific treatises of Hinduism such as Sushruta Samhita and Charaka Samhita. The Mahabharata, for example, features many verse metres in its chapters, but 95% of the stanzas are ślokas of the anuṣṭubh type, and most of the rest are tristubhs.

The anuṣṭubh is found in Vedic texts, but its presence is minor, and triṣṭubh and gāyatrī metres dominate in the Rigveda. A dominating presence of ślokas in a text is a marker that the text is likely post-Vedic.

The traditional view is that this form of verse was involuntarily composed by Vālmīki, the author of the Rāmāyaṇa, in grief on seeing a hunter shoot down one of two birds in love. On seeing the sorrow (śoka) of the widowed bird, he was reminded of the sorrow Sītā felt on being separated from Shri Rama and began composing the Ramayana in shlokas. For this he is called the Ādikavi (first poet.)

In addition to the Sanskrit śloka, several Indian vernacular languages utilize this form in the maṅgaḷācaraṇam, a set of benedictory verses that precede a work of poetry or technical writing.

== Metrical pattern ==
Each 16-syllable hemistich (half-verse), of two 8-syllable pādas, can take either a pathyā ("normal") form or one of several vipulā ("extended") forms. The form of the second foot of the first pāda (II.) limits the possible patterns the first foot (I.) may assume.

The scheme below, given by Macdonell, shows his understanding of the form of the śloka in the classical period of Sanskrit literature (4th–11th centuries CE):

In poems of the intermediate period, such as the Bhagavad Gita, a fourth vipulā is found. This occurs 28 times in the Bhagavad Gita, that is, as often as the third vipulā. When this vipulā is used, there is a word-break (caesura) after the fourth syllable:

| u u u –, | – u – u ||

Two rules that always apply are:

1. In both pādas, in syllables 2–3, u u is not allowed.
2. In the second pāda, in syllables 2–4, – u – is not allowed

The pathyā and vipulā half-verses are arranged in the table above in order of frequency of occurrence. Out of 2579 half-verses taken from Kalidasa, Bharavi, Magha, and Bilhana, each of the four admissible forms of śloka in this order claims the following share: 2289, 116, 89, 85; that is, 89% of the half-verses have the regular pathyā form.

The various vipulās, in the order above, are known to scholars writing in English as the first, second, third and fourth vipulā, or the paeanic, choriambic, molossic, and trochaic vipulā respectively. In Sanskrit writers, they are referred to as the na-, bha-, ma-, and ra-vipulā. A fifth vipulā, known as the minor Ionic, in which the first pāda ends | u u – x |, is sometimes found in the Mahābhārata, although rarely.

Macdonell's chart given above is in fact too restrictive with regard the first four syllables in a vipulā verse. For example, the first quarter verse of the Rāmayaṇa (critical edition) contains a na-vipulā and scans ⏑ – – – ⏑ ⏑ ⏑ – (tapaḥsvādhyāyanirataṃ). Other examples are easy to find among classical poets, e.g., Rāmacarita 1.76 manyur dehāvadhir ayaṃ – – – – ⏑ ⏑ ⏑ –. In the ma-vipulā, a caesura is not obligatory after the fifth syllable, e.g., Śiśupālavadha 2.1a yiyakṣamāṇenāhūtaḥ ⏑ – ⏑ – – – – –.

Noteworthy is the avoidance of an iambic cadence in the first pāda. By comparison, syllables 5–8 of any pāda in the old Vedic anuṣṭubh metre typically had the iambic ending u – u x (where "x" represents an anceps syllable).

Statistical studies examining the frequency of the vipulās and the patterns in the earlier part of the pāda have been carried out to try to establish the preferences of various authors for different metrical patterns. It is believed that this may help to establish relative dates for the poems, and to identify interpolated passages.

The Kannada śloka described by Nāgavarma I in his Chandombudhi allows any light (laghu) or heavy (guru) syllable in the first four and the eighth syllable, requires a light and heavy syllable in the fifth and sixth respectively, and alternates the seventh as long in odd-numbered pādas and short in even-numbered ones. The eighth syllable is often heavy, but it is not mandatory. Nāgavarma does say, however, that the seventh syllable may be also long across all four pādas, citing the practice of earlier poets.

== Examples ==
A typical śloka is the following, which opens the Bhagavad Gita:

dharma-kṣetre kuru-kṣetre
samavetā yuyutsavaḥ
māmakāḥ pāṇḍavāś caiva
kim akurvata sañjaya

| – – – – | u – – – |
| u u – – | u – u – ||
| – u – – | u – – u |
| u u – u | u – u u ||

"(Dhṛtaraṣṭra said:) In the place of righteousness, at Kurukṣetra,
gathered together and desiring battle,
my sons and the sons of Pandu,
what did they do, Sanjaya?"

From the period of high classical Sanskrit literature comes this benediction, which opens Bāṇabhaṭṭa's biographical poem Harṣacaritam (7th century CE):

namas-tuṅga-śiraś-cumbi- candra-cāmara-cārave /
trailokya-nagarārambha- mūla-stambhāya śambhave //

| u – – u | u – – u | – u – u | u – u – ||
| – – u u | u – – u | – – – – | u – u – ||

"Praise be to Śambhu, beautified by the chowrie moon touching his lofty head;
like a foundation pillar of a city that is the universe."

When a śloka is recited, performers sometimes leave a pause after each pāda, at other times only after the second pāda. (See External links.)

== Difference between shloka and mantra ==
A Shloka has to be composed in a specific metre (chhanda), with a specific number of lines with a specific number of words per line, each word could be a mantra. For example, viṣṇu sahastranāma is in anuṣṭup chhanda (two lines of four words each).

A mantra, on the other hand, is prefixed by omkara (primordial sound) and suffixed by the essential nama (name) and the salutary word nama (salutation) between the prefix and the suffix. No metre is prescribed. The lyrics in any Vārnic or matric metres are shlokas, but stanzas from Vedic hymns are not shloka, despite it being a common mistake to think this.

== Names and people ==
The word “Shloka” can also be found as a name in various parts of India. The Hindu name “Shloka” can directly be translated to “poems of god”

Some historical figures or people with this name:

- Shloka Mehta Ambani (daughter of diamanteer Russell Mehta and wife of Akash Ambani)
  - Shloka Birla: A member of the prominent Birla business family of India; she is the daughter of industrialist Yashovardhan Birla.
  - Shloka Chandra : Shloka is a 15 -year-old female originally from kerala, India. Named after the traditional Sanskrit word for a sacred verse, she carries an identity that beautifully bridges a rich cultural heritage with a modern outlook. She was raised by her parents, Satish chandran ( co-founder and CEO of dicode technologies LLC) and Saranya Satish ,who instilled in her the core values of dedication and community. Today, Shloka resides in Dubai where she continues to carve out her own path while remaining deeply grounded in her roots and family values.
