= Karl Hoffmann (linguist) =

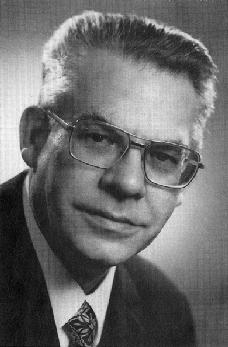
- Karl Hoffmann (date unknown).
- Born: 26 February 1915; Hof
- Died: 21 May 1996 (aged 81); Erlangen

Academic background
- Education: Ludwig-Maximilians-Universität München
- Thesis: Die altindoarischen Wörter mit -ṇḍ- besonders im Ṛgveda (1941)

Academic work
- Discipline: Linguistics
- Sub-discipline: Indo-European and Indo-Iranian studies
- Institutions: Saarland University; University of Erlangen–Nuremberg
- Doctoral students: Johanna Narten

Karl Hoffmann (26 February 1915 – 21 May 1996) was a German linguist who specialized in Indo-European and Indo-Iranian studies. He is most recognized for his achievements in his studies of Vedic Sanskrit, Avestan and Old Persian languages.

== Biography ==
=== Early life ===
Karl Hoffmann was born the son of a railway official, during World War I in Hof, Upper Palatinate, Kingdom of Bavaria, German Empire. His family later moved to the state capital of Munich, where he remained for the duration of his childhood.

=== World War II ===
In 1934, Hoffmann began his education in Indo-European studies, which he continued until he was called in for military service for Nazi Germany at the start of World War II in 1939. Hoffmann took his leave from the war during 1941, just long enough to receive his doctorate for his unpublished dissertation, titled Die altindoarischen Wörter mit -ṇḍ- besonders im Ṛgveda. Hoffmann was at the Russian front until 1943, after which he joined the Indian Legion (Indische Legion), together with other German Indologists, such as Paul Thieme and Gustav Roth.

=== After the war ===
Once World War II had ended in 1945, Hoffmann returned to Munich in Occupied Germany, and was able to continue his academic work at the Ludwig-Maximilians-Universität München in Indo-Iranian studies. In 1951, he qualified as a university lecturer with his habilitation thesis, Der Injunktiv im Veda.

In 1952, Hoffmann moved to Saarbrücken, Saarland (then under the Saar Protectorate), where he taught Indo-European linguistics to his students at Saarland University. He continued teaching this course until 1955, when he accepted the chair of comparative linguistics at Friedrich-Alexander-University, Erlangen-Nuremberg. He was offered a position at the University of Bonn in 1962, but refused, and thus remained in Erlangen until his retirement in 1983. His notable students include Johanna Narten, discoverer of the Indo-European Narten present.

== Bibliography ==
- Hoffmann, Karl, Der Injunktiv im Veda: Eine synchronische Funktionsuntersuchung (1967), C. Winter. ISBN 3-8253-0681-X
- Hoffmann, Karl, Aufsätze zur Indoiranistik (1975, 1976, 1992), Reichert. ISBN 3-920153-47-2
- Hoffmann, Karl; Narten, J., Der Sasanidische Archetypus: Untersuchungen zu Schreibung und Lautgestalt des Avestischen (1989), Wiesbaden. ISBN 3-88226-470-5
- Forssman, Bernhard; Hoffman, Karl, Avestische Laut- und Flexionslehre (1996), Innsbruck. ISBN 3-85124-652-7
