= Johanna Narten =

German linguist (1930–2019)

- Born: 5 October 1930; Hanover, Weimar Republic (now Germany)
- Died: 15 July 2019 (aged 88); Uttenreuth, Germany
- Known for: Narten presents

Academic background
- Education: University of Saarland
- Thesis: Die sigmatische Aoriste im Veda (1964)
- Doctoral advisor: Karl Hoffmann

Academic work
- Discipline: Linguist
- Sub-discipline: Indo-European linguistics
- Institutions: University of Erlangen-Nuremberg

Johanna "Jo" Narten (5 October 1930 – 15 July 2019) was a German Indo-Europeanist and Indo-Iranian linguist who discovered the reconstructed morphological category in Proto-Indo-European now known as the Narten present. She was Professor of Indo-European and Indo-Iranian Linguistics at Friedrich-Alexander-Universität Erlangen-Nürnberg and a member of the Bayerische Akademie der Wissenschaften.

== Early life ==
Johanna Narten, known as "Jo", was born in Hanover on 5 October 1930 to Herta and Karl Narten, who had met while studying chemistry in Berlin. During World War II, she and her mother were evacuated to stay with family in Eisenberg; her father had been recruited into the German army. While in Eisenberg, Narten began learning Latin with her grandfather. Following the war the family returned to Hannover, where Narten attended the Wilhelm-Raabe-Schule, graduating in 1950.

== Academic career ==
Narten originally learned Greek and Hebrew in order to study theology at university, but ultimately studied classical philology instead. In 1951 she enrolled at the University of Saarland in 1951, first studying with Ernst Zinn and then switching to studying Indo-European linguistics, in particular Indo-Iranian linguistics (especially Vedic Sanskrit and Avestan), with Karl Hoffmann, who became the Chair of Indo-European Studies at the university in 1952. In 1955, Narten moved with Hoffman to the University of Erlangen, where he supervised her PhD dissertation, "Entstehung und Ausbreitung der sigmatischen Aoriste in der vedischen Literatur" ["Development and distribution of the sigmatic aorists in Vedic literature"], awarded in 1961 and published in 1964. Narten's Habilitation thesis, completed in 1971, was a philological and linguistic study of the Zoroastrian sacred text Yasna Haptaŋhāiti. She was appointed to a teaching position at the University of Erlangen in 1973, followed by an appointment in 1978 to a personal chair as Professor of Indo-European and Indo-Iranian Linguistics, which she held until she retired in 1993.

In 1995, she became the first woman admitted as a full member of the Class for Philosophy and History of the Bayerische Akademie der Wissenschaften (Bavarian Academy of Sciences and Humanities), alongside Regine Kahmann as the first woman admitted in the Class for Mathematics and the Natural Sciences.

== Scholarship ==
Narten's first book, based on her PhD dissertation, was published in 1964, and is described by Almut Hintze as a 'masterpiece' which 'has remained an essential tool for grammatical analysis in Vedic and Indo-Iranian Studies to the present day'. Her 1968 article "On the 'proterodynamic' root present' ("Zum 'proterodynamischen' Wurzelpräsens"), in which she showed the existence of a class of verbs that feature a lengthened e-grade in the present, is described by Hintze as a "seminal" article, due to which "her name has become a sort of hallmark far beyond the remit of Indo-Iranian Studies": this verb-form is now known as the Narten present. Her later work included monographs on Zoroastrian religion and religious texts, in particular the Yasna Haptaŋhāiti, which had been the subject of her Habilitation thesis, and (with Karl Hoffman) on the Avestan script, as well as numerous articles in the field of Indo-Iranian studies.

A Festschrift was published in 2000 to honour Narten's 70th birthday, entitled Anusantatyai: Festschrift für Johanna Narten zum 70. Geburtstag.

== Selected publications ==
- Narten, Johanna (1964). Die sigmatischen Aoriste im Veda. Wiesbaden: Otto Harrassowitz.
- Narten, Johanna (1982). Die Ameṣ̌a Speṇtas im Avesta. Wiesbaden: O. Harrassowitz. ISBN 3447022000.
- Narten, Johanna (1986). Der Yasna Haptanhāiti. Wiesbaden: L. Reichert. ISBN 3882262834.
- Narten, Johanna; Hoffmann, Karl (1989). Der Sasanidische Archetypus: Untersuchungen zu Schreibung und Lautgestalt des Avestischen. Wiesbaden: Reichert Verlag. ISBN 9783882264708.
- Narten, Johanna (1995). Kleine Schriften (hrsg. von Marcos Albino und Matthias Fritz). Wiesbaden: Reichert Verlag. ISBN 9783882268485.
