= Oswald Szemerényi =

Hungarian-British linguist (1913–1996)

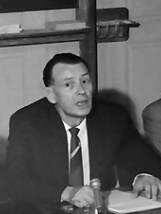
- Szemerényi at the University of Freiburg in 1966
- Born: 7 September 1913; London, United Kingdom
- Died: 29 December 1996 (aged 83); Freiburg im Breisgau, Germany
- Occupations: Indo-Europeanist; linguist
- Known for: Szemerényi's law
- Spouse: Elizabeth Kövér (m. 1940)
- Children: 1

Oswald John Louis Szemerényi FBA (Hungarian pronunciation: [ˈsɛmɛreːɲi]; 7 September 1913 – 29 December 1996) was a Hungarian-British historical linguist and Indo-Europeanist. He is best known as the namesake of Szemerényi's law, a potential early sound law in the Proto-Indo-European language.

== Biography ==
Szemerényi was born in London to Hungarian parents. When the First World War began, he and his mother were expelled to Hungary; neither of them had ever seen the country before as his mother was born in Bonn and moved to London two years after she was born. His father was interned on the Isle of Man for the entirety of the war. The family found patronage from the Countess Széchenyi and his mother began working for her in Budapest. When his father returned, he found gainful employment at the Hotel Gellért as the head waiter, due to his exceptional English.

In 1931, Oswald was made a fellow at Eötvös Loránd University based on the success of his primary examination. There, he learned French, Sanskrit, Gothic, and Old Church Slavonic. He received his PhD in Indo-European linguistics in 1936 and published his first book publication, Liquid Sonants in Latin, in 1941, edited by Gyula Laziczius. On 5 November 1940, he married Elizabeth Kövér in Beregszász (now Berehove, Ukraine). During 1942, he was drafted and sent eastward to the Soviet border regions around Shostka, in modern-day Ukraine near its border with Russia. There, he learned Russian and saw no combat; he later joked that his time in the war was "just a nice study leave to learn the [Russian] language". In October of the same year, he received news that his wife had given birth to his son – Zoltán – who very quickly required a major surgery, leaving him with a massive scar. Oswald was relieved of duty in August 1943.

After the fall of Budapest in 1945, Szemerényi was placed in charge of a university institute and had his apartment quartered for Russian medical personnel. Initially, he had supported the Hungarian Communist Party, believing that they could implement the rapid change that was necessary for Hungary after losing the war and that it would be ultimately a transient effort, though he quickly became disillusioned and, by his own admission, never read any communist literature. In 1948, he moved to Italy, where he applied to have his British citizenship recognized for repatriation. This request was granted and he and his family moved to the United Kingdom in October 1948. During his first years in the United Kingdom, he had several varied jobs, mostly working as a translator in various capacities as Cold War tensions increased. He worked as a translator for the BBC in Caversham, Reading before moving to London to work for Reuters after beating out the reporters they had stationed in Hungary at the time. Eventually, he resumed his intellectual pursuits professionally when in 1952, Otto Skutsch requested that he give a course in philology, with the understanding that it would later develop into a teaching post. Ultimately, he was able to reestablish himself in academia, becoming the university chair for comparative philology at University College London in 1960.

== Selected works ==
- 1960 Studies in the Indo-European System of Numerals, Heidelberg
- 1964 Syncope in Greek and Indo-European and the Nature of Indo-European Accent, Napoli
- 1970 Einführung in die vergleichende Sprachwissenschaft, Darmstadt
  - 1989 3., vollständig neu bearbeitete Auflage
  - 1996 Introduction to Indo-European Linguistics, Oxford
- Richtungen der modernen Sprachwissenschaft
  - 1971 Teil I: Von Saussure bis Bloomfield, 1916-1950, Heidelberg
  - 1982 Teil II: Die fünfziger Jahre, 1950-1960, Heidelberg
- 1972 Comparative Linguistics (Current Trends of Linguistics)
- 1977 Studies in the Kinship Terminology of the Indo-European Languages, Leiden
- 1980 Four Old Iranian Ethnic Names: Scythian - Skudra - Sogdian - Saka, Vienna
- Scripta Minora: selected essays in Indo-European, Greek, and Latin, edited by Patrick Considine and James T. Hooker, Innsbruck,
  - 1987 Vol. I: Indo-European
  - 1987 Vol. II: Latin
  - 1987 Vol. III: Greek
  - 1991 Vol. IV: Indo-European Languages other than Latin and Greek (1991)
- 1989 An den Quellen des lateinischen Wortschatzes, Innsbruck
- 1991 Summing Up a Life

== See also ==
- Szemerényi's law
