= Jochem Schindler =

Austrian Indo-Europeanist (1944–1994)

- Born: 8 November 1944; Amstetten, Nazi Austria
- Died: 24 December 1994 (aged 50); Prague, Czech Republic
- Spouse: Hermione
- Children: 1

Academic work
- Discipline: Linguistics

Jochem "Joki" Schindler (8 November 1944 – 24 December 1994) was an Austrian Indo-Europeanist. In spite of his comparatively thin bibliography, he made important contributions, in particular to the theory of Proto-Indo-European nominal inflection and ablaut. He taught at University of Vienna from 1972 to 1978, as a professor at Harvard University from 1978 to 1987, then at Vienna. A meticulous scholar, he also recognized that mistakes were inevitable, and his phrase "courage to err" (German: Mut zum Irrtum) became popular with his colleagues, including Calvert Watkins. With Watkins and others, he was a founding member of the East Coast Indo-European Conference in 1982.

== Partial bibliography ==
- 1966 ‘Germanisch selχaz "Seehund"’, Die Sprache 12, pp. 65–6.
- 1966 'Bemerkungen zum idg. Wort für “Schlaf”', Die Sprache 12, pp. 67–76.
- 1966 ‘Hethittisch lissi "Leber"’, Die Sprache 12, pp. 77–78.
- 1969 'Die idg. Worter fur “Vogel” und “Ei”', Die Sprache 15, pp. 144-67.
- 1970. Review of Raimo Anttila's Proto-Indo-European Schebeablaut Berkeley, U. California Press. 1969, in Kratylos 15, pp. 146–52.
- 1972 'L'apophonie des noms racines indo-européens', Bulletin de la Société Linguistique de Paris 67, 1–10.
- 1973 'Bemerkungen zur Herkunft der idg. Diphthongstamme und zu den Eigentiimlichkeiten ihrer Kasusformen', Die Sprache 19, pp. 148-57.
- 1973 'Wortbildungsregeln', Die Sprache 19, pp. 39-52
- 1975 ‘Zu hethitisch nekuz’, Die Sprache 21, pp. 289-303.
- 1975a ‘L'apophonie des thèmes indo-européens en -r/n’, Bulletin de la Société Linguistique de Paris 70, pp. 1–10.
- 1975b 'Zum Ablaut der neutralen s-Stämme des Indogermanischen,' in Flexion und Wortbildung. Ed. Helmut Rix. Wiesbaden: Reichert, pp. 259–67.
- 1976 'On the Greek type ππεύς', in Studies in Greek, Italic and Indo-European linguistics offered to L. R. Palmer on the occasion of his seventieth birthday. Eds. A. Morpurgo Davies & W. Meid. Innsbruck: Institut für Sprachen und Literaturen der Universität Innsbruck, pp. 349-352.
- 1977a. 'A thorny problem', Die Sprache 23, pp. 25–35.
- 1977b. 'Notizen zum Sieversschen Gesetz,' Die Sprache 23, pp. 56–65.
- 1980. 'Zur Herkunft der altindischen cvi-Bildungen', in Lautgeschichte und Etymologie: Akten der VI. Fachtagung der Idg. Gesellschaft. Eds. M. Mayrhofer, M. Peters, & O. E. Pfeiffer. Wiesbaden: Reichert, pp. 386-93.
- 1986 “Zu den homerischen ροδοδακτυλος-Komposita”, in O-o-pe-ro-si: Festschrift für Ernst Risch zum 75 Geburtstag. Ed. Annemarie Etter. Berlin: de Gruyter, pp. 393-401.
- 1994. 'Alte und neue Fragen zum indogermanischen Nomen', in In Honorem Holger Pederson. Ed. Jens E. Rasmussen. Wiesbaden: Reichert, pp. 397–400,.
