= Pada (foot) =

Sanskrit term for "foot"

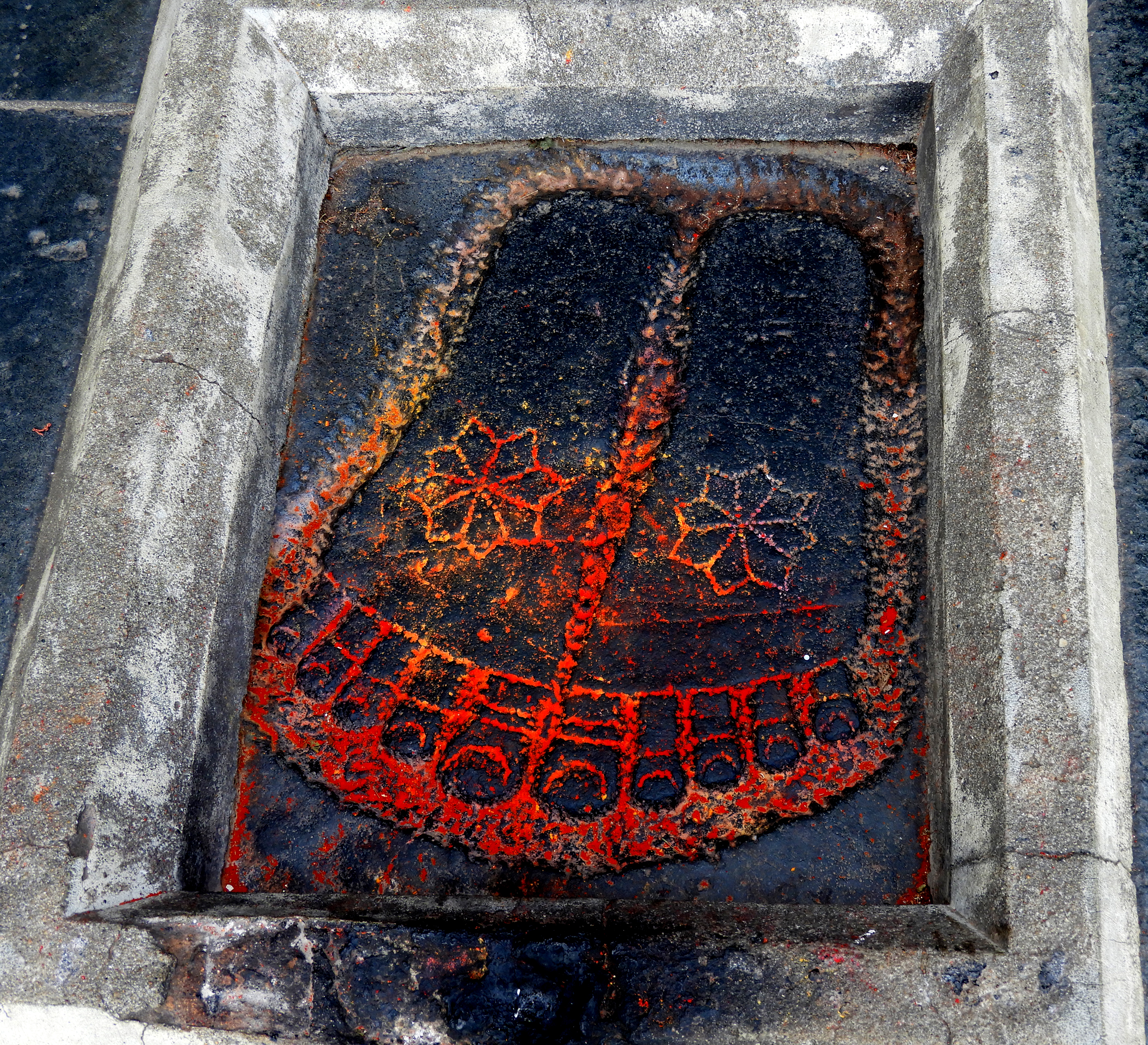
Ceremonial footprints of Vishnu, Chennakeshava Temple.

Pāda is the Sanskrit term for "foot" (cognate to English foot, Latin pes, Greek pous), with derived meanings "step, stride; footprint, trace; vestige, mark". The term has a wide range of applications, including any one of four parts (as it were, one foot of a quadruped), or any sub-division more generally, e.g. a chapter of a book (originally a section of a book divided in four parts).

In Sanskrit metre, pāda is the term for a quarter of a stanza. Thus in the shloka it is any of the eight-syllable sections of the 32-syllable stanza.

As a measure of length, a pada amounts to 12 or 15 fingers' breadth, or 1/2 or 1/3 or 3/7 of a Prakrama.

In Sanskrit grammar, a pada is any inflected word (noun or verb).

In Buddhism, pāda is the term for a Buddha footprint. Gautama Buddha's footprints symbolized his presence, and his image and iconography developed several centuries after he had died. There are also several landmarks venerated as "footprints" (pāda, also pādamudrā) of Hindu deities. For example, Si Pada on Adam's Peak is a rock formation in Sri Lanka venerated as the footprint of Buddha in Buddhist tradition, the footprint of Shiva in Hinduism, and the footprint of Adam in Muslim tradition.

== See also ==
- Mudra
- Paduka
- Petrosomatoglyph
