= Proto-Indo-European pronouns =

Pronouns in the theorized common ancestor of the Indo-European language family

Proto-Indo-European pronouns have been reconstructed by modern linguists, based on similarities found across all Indo-European languages. This article lists and discusses the hypothesised forms.

Proto-Indo-European (PIE) pronouns, especially demonstrative pronouns, are difficult to reconstruct because of their variety in later languages.

== Grammatical categories ==
PIE pronouns inflected for case and number, and partly for gender. For more information on these categories, see the article on Proto-Indo-European nominals.

== Personal pronouns ==
PIE had personal pronouns in the first and second person, but not the third person, where demonstratives were used instead. They were inflected for case and number (singular, dual, and plural), but not for gender. The personal pronouns had their own unique forms and endings, and some had two distinct stems; this is most obvious in the first person singular, where the two stems are still preserved, as for instance in English I and me. There were also two varieties for the accusative, genitive and dative cases, a stressed and an enclitic form. Many of the special pronominal endings were later borrowed as nominal endings.

The following tables give the paradigms as reconstructed by Beekes and by Sihler.

Beekes' reconstruction of PIE personal pronouns
		First person		Second person	
		Singular	Plural	Singular	Plural
Nominative		*h₁eǵ(oH/Hom)	*uei	*tuH	*iuH
Accusative	stressed	*h₁mé	*nsmé	*tué	*usmé
Accusative	enclitic	*h₁me	*nōs	*te	*uōs
Genitive	stressed	*h₁méne	*ns(er)o-	*teue	*ius(er)o-
Genitive	enclitic	*h₁moi	*nos	*toi	*uos
Dative	stressed	*h₁méǵʰio	*nsmei	*tébʰio	*usmei
Dative	enclitic	*h₁moi	*ns	*toi	*?
Instrumental		*h₁moí	*?	*toí	*?
Ablative		*h₁med	*nsmed	*tued	*usmed
Locative		*h₁moí	*nsmi	*toí	*usmi

Sihler's reconstruction of PIE personal pronouns
		First person			Second person		
		Singular	Dual	Plural	Singular	Dual	Plural
Nominative		*eǵoH	*weh₁	*we-i	*tī̆ (*tū̆)	*yuh₁ (*yūh₁?)	*yūs (*yuHs?)
Accusative	tonic	*m-mé (> *mé)	*n̥h₁-wé	*n̥smé	*twé	*uh₁-wé	*usmé
Accusative	enclitic	*me	*nō̆h₁	*nō̆s	*te	*wō̆h₁	*wō̆s
Genitive	tonic	*mé-me	*nō̆h₁	*n̥sóm	*té-we	*wō̆h₁	*usóm
Genitive	enclitic	*mos (adj.)	*nō̆h₁	*nō̆s	*tos (adj.)	*wō̆h₁	*wō̆s
Dative	tonic	*mébhi	*nō̆h₁	*n̥sm-éy	*tébhi	*wō̆h₁	*usm-éy
Dative	enclitic	*mey, *moy?	*nō̆h₁	*nō̆s	*tey, *toy	*wō̆h₁	*wō̆s
Ablative		*mm-ét (> *mét)	*nō̆h₁	*n̥sm-ét	*tw-ét	*wō̆h₁	*usm-ét

Other reconstructions typically differ only slightly from Beekes and Sihler (see for example Fortson 2004).

== Demonstrative pronouns ==
As for demonstratives, Beekes tentatively reconstructs a system with only two pronouns: *so "this, that" and *h₁e "the (just named)" (anaphoric, reconstructed as *ei- by Fortson). He gives the following paradigms:

	Demonstrative pronouns (Beekes)					
	Singular			Plural		
	Masculine	Neuter	Feminine	Masculine	Neuter	Feminine
Nominative	*so	*tod	*seh₂	*toi	*teh₂	*seh₂i??
Accusative	*tóm	*tod	*teh₂m	*tons	*teh₂	*teh₂ns
Genitive	*(to)sio		*(t)eseh₂s	*tesom?		*tesom?
Ablative	*tosmōd			*toios?		
Dative	*tosmōi		*tesieh₂ei	*toimus		*teh₂mus?
Locative	*tosmi		*tesieh₂i	*toisu		*teh₂su?
Instrumental	*toi?		*toi?	*toibʰi		*teh₂bʰi?
Nominative	*h₁e	*(h₁)id	*(h₁)ih₂	*h₁ei	*ih₂	*ih₂es
Accusative	*im	*(h₁)id	*ih₂m	*ins	*ih₂	*ih₂ns
Genitive	*h₁éso		*h₁eseh₂s?	*h₁es(om)		
Ablative	*h₁esmōd			*h₁eios?		
Dative	*h₁esmōi		*h₁esieh₂ei	*h₁eimus		
Locative	*h₁esmi		*h₁esieh₂i	*h₁eisu		
Instrumental	*h₁ei?			*h₁eibʰi		

Beekes also postulates three adverbial particles, from which demonstratives were constructed in various later languages: *ḱi "here" (reconstructed as a demonstrative *ḱi- "this" by Fortson) *h₂en "there" and *h₂eu "away, again",

	Demonstrative pronouns (Sihler)					
	Singular			Plural		
	Masculine	Neuter	Feminine	Masculine	Neuter	Feminine
Nominative	*so	*tod	*seh₂, *sih₂	*toy	*teh₂	*teh₂s
Accusative	*tom	*tod	*teh₂m	*toms	*teh₂	*teh₂ms
Genitive	*tosyo		*tosyeh₂s	*toysō̆m		*teh₂sō̆m
Ablative	*tosmōd		*tosyeh₂s	*toybʰ-		*teh₂bʰ-
Dative	*tosmey		*tosyeh₂ey	*toybʰ-		*teh₂bʰ-
Locative	*tosmi		*?	*toysu		*teh₂su
Instrumental	*?		*?	*?		*?
Nominative	*is	*id	*ih₂	*eyes	*ih₂	*ih₂es
Accusative	*im	*id	*ih₂m	*ins	*ih₂	*ih₂ms
Genitive	*esyo		*esyeh₂s	*eysom		
Ablative	*esmod		*esyeh₂s	*eybʰ-		
Dative	*esmey		*esyeh₂ey	*eybʰ-		
Locative	*esmi		*?	*eysu		
Instrumental	*?			*?		

== Reflexive pronoun ==
A third-person reflexive pronoun *s(w)e-, parallel to the first and second person singular personal pronouns, also existed, though it lacked a nominative form:

Reflexive pronoun (Beekes)
Accusative	*se
Genitive	*seue, *sei
Dative	*sebʰio, *soi

== Relative pronoun ==
PIE had a relative pronoun with the stem *(H)yo-.

== Interrogative/indefinite pronoun ==
There was also a pronoun with the stem *kʷe- / *kʷi- (adjectival *kʷo-) used both as an interrogative and an indefinite pronoun.

Interrogative pronoun (Sihler)
	Pronominal				Adjectival					
	Singular		Plural		Singular			Plural		
	Masc./Fem.	Neuter	Masc./Fem.	Neuter	Masculine	Neuter	Feminine	Masculine	Neuter	Feminine
Nominative	*kʷis	*kʷid	*kʷeyes	*kʷih₂	*kʷos	*kʷod	*kʷeh₂	*kʷoy	*kʷeh₂	*kʷeh₂(e)s
Accusative	*kʷim	*kʷid	*kʷims	*kʷih₂	*kʷom	*kʷod	*kʷeh₂m	*kʷoms	*kʷeh₂	*kʷeh₂ms
Dative	*kʷesmey		*kʷeybh-		*kʷosmey		?	?		
Genitive	*kʷesyo		*kʷeysom		*kʷosyo		?	?		
Locative	*kʷesmi		*kʷeysu		?		?	?		

== Pronominal adjectives ==
Proto-Indo-European possessed few adjectives that had a distinct set of endings, identical to those of the demonstrative pronoun above but differing from those of regular adjectives. They included at least *h₂élyos "other, another".

== Reflexes ==
Reflexes, or descendants of the PIE reconstructed forms in its daughter languages, include the following.

Type	Reconstruction	Reflexes
1st sg. nom.	*eǵoH	Hitt. ūk, Ved. ahám, Av. azəm, Gk. ἐγώ(ν), Lat. ego, Goth. ik, Eng. I, Gm. ich, Du. ik, Alb. u-në, Bulg. аз\az, Russ. я\ja, Kamviri õc, Carian uk, Osset. æz/æz, Umb. eho, ON ek, Lith. aš, Venet. ego
1st sg. oblique	*me	Ved. mām, Av. mąm, Gk. ἐμέ, Lat. mē, Eng. mec/me, Gm. mih/mich, Du. mij, Osset./Pers. mæn, Umb. mehe, Ir. mé, Welsh mi, Russ. mne, Alb. mua, Lith. mane, Venet. mego
1st pl. nom.	*we-i	Hitt. wēš, Ved. vayám, Av. vaēm, Goth. wit (dual), weis, Toch. was/wes, Eng. we, Gm. wir, Du. wij, Pers. vayam/?, ON vér, Lith. vedu
1st pl. oblique	*nō̆s	Hitt. anzāš, Gk. νώ (dual), Lat. nōs, Goth. uns, Toch. ñäś (sg.), Gm. uns, Eng. us, Du. ons, Skr. nas, Av. nō, Pers. amaxām/?, ON oss, okkr, Old Ir. ni, Welsh ni, OPruss. noūson, Lith. nuodu, Pol., Russ. nas, Alb. ne
2nd sg.	*tī̆ (*tū̆) / *te	Hitt. zīk, Ved. tvám, Av. tū, Gk. σύ, Doric τύ, Lat. tū, Goth. þu, Toch. tu/tuwe, OCS ty Gm. du, Eng. thou, Pers. tuva/to, Osset. dy, Kashmiri tsū', Kamviri tü, Umb. tu, tui, Osc. tuvai, ON þú, Ir. tú/thú, Welsh ti, Arm. tu/du, OPruss. toū, Pol. ty, Russ. ty, Lith. tu, Ltv. tu, Alb. ti
2nd pl. nom.	*yū(H)s	Ved. yūyám, Av. yūš, Gk. ὑμεῖς, Goth. jūs, Toch. yas/yes, Eng. gē/ye; ēow/you, Gm. ir/ihr, Du. jij / gij, ON ykkr, yðr, Arm. dzez/dzez/cez, OPruss. ioūs, Lith. jūs, Ltv. jūs, Alb. juve, ju
2nd pl. oblique	*wō̆s	Lat. vōs, Skr. vas, Av. vō, Umb. uestra, OPruss. wans, Pol. wy, was, Russ. vy, vas, Alb. u
Demonstrative ("this, that")	*so (m), *se-h₂ (f), *to-d (n)	Ved. sá, sā, tád, Av. hō, hā, tat̰, Gk. ὁ, ἡ, τό, Goth. sa, so, þata, Icel. sá, sú, það, TochB. se, sā, te Old Eng. se, seo, thæt, Russ. tot, ta, to, Lith. tas, ta, tai
Demonstrative ("the just named; this")	*h₁e / *ei-	Ved. ay-ám, id-ám, Av. īm "him", Lat. is, ea, id, Alb. aì (he, that), ajò (she, that), Goth. is "he" Skr. it
Demonstrative / adverbial particle	*ḱi(-)	Lat. cis, Eng. he, Gm. heute "on this day, today", OCS sĭ, Lith. šìs, ON hér, Goth. hita, Eng. it, Gm. hier, Russ. sije
Reflexive	*s(w)e-	Ved. sva-yám, Av. xᵛāi, Gk. ἑ-, Lat. sē, sibi, suus, Old Ir. fa(-dessin), Ir. féin, OCS sę, Gm. sih/sich, sin/sein, Du. zich, zijn Carian sfes, Lyd. śfa-, Osc. sífeí, Umb. seso, ON sik, sinn, Goth. sik, Arm. ink῾s, OPruss. sien, sin, Lith. savęs, Latv. sevi, Russ. sebe, -sja, Alb. vetë, u, Phryg. ve
Relative	*(H)yo-	Ved. yá-, Av. ya-, Gk. ὅ-, Proto-Celtic *yo-
Interrogative pronoun	*kʷi-s (m, f), *kʷi-d (n)	Hitt. kuiš, Luw. kuiš, Gk. τίς, Lat. quis, quid, Ir. cia, Eng. hwī/–, OCS čĭto Lyc. tike, Lyd. qi-, Osset. či, Pers. čiy/ki, Osc. pisi, Umb. púí, svepis, ON hverr, Welsh pwi, Russ. čto, Alb. çë
Interrogative adjective	*kʷo-s (m), *kʷe-h₂ (f), *kʷo-d (n)	Ved. kás, Av. kō, Gk. ποῦ "where?", pōs "somehow", Goth. ƕas, Lith. kàs, OCS kŭto Eng. hwā/who; hwæt/what, Gm. hwër/wer, Du. wie / wat, Carian kuo, Kashmiri kus, Kamviri kâča, Lat. qui, quae, quod; Arm. ov, inč῾, Toch. kus/kŭse, Ltv. kas, Pol. kto, Russ. kto, Alb. ku, kush, Phryg. kos
"(an)other"	*alyo-	Gk. ἄλλος, Lat. alius, Goth. aljis, Ir. ail/eile, Toch. ālak/alyek, Gm. eli-lenti "in another land, expelled" / elend "miserable, wretched", Eng. elles/else, Lyd. aλaś, Skr. araṇa, Osc. allo, ON elligar, Gaul. alla, Arm. ayl

In the following languages, two reflexes separated by a slash means:

- English: Old English / Modern English
- German: Old High German / New High German
- Irish: Old Irish / Modern Irish
- Persian: Old Persian / Modern Persian
- Tocharian: Tocharian A / Tocharian B

== Sources ==
- Beekes, Robert S. P. (2011), Comparative Indo-European Linguistics: An Introduction, John Benjamins, ISBN 978-90-272-1185-9
- Fortson, Benjamin W. IV (2004), Indo-European Language and Culture, Blackwell Publishing, ISBN 1-4051-0316-7
- Grebe, Paul (1963), Duden Etymologie (in German), Mannheim: Bibliographisches Institut, ISBN 3-411-00907-1
- Ringe, Don (2006). From Proto-Indo-European to Proto-Germanic. A Linguistic History of English. Vol. 1 (1st ed.). New York City: Oxford University Press. ISBN 978-0-19-928413-9. OCLC 64554645. OL 7405151M. Wikidata Q131605459.
- Sihler, Andrew L. (1995), New Comparative Grammar of Greek and Latin, Oxford University Press, ISBN 0-19-508345-8
