= Stang's law =

Proto-Indo-European language sound law

Stang's law is a Proto-Indo-European (PIE) phonological rule named after the Norwegian linguist Christian Stang.

== Overview ==
The law governs the word-final sequences of a vowel, followed by a semivowel (*y or *w) or a laryngeal (*h₁, *h₂, *h₃), followed by a nasal. According to the law these sequences are simplified such that laryngeals and semivowels are dropped, with compensatory lengthening of a preceding vowel.

This rule is usually cited in more restricted form as: *Vwm > *Vːm and *Vh₂m > *Vːm (*V denoting a vowel and *Vː a long vowel).

Often the rules *Vmm > *Vːm and also *Vyi > *Vːy are added:

- PIE *dyéwm 'sky' (accusative singular) > *dyḗm > Sanskrit dyā́m, acc. sg. of dyaús, Latin diem (which served as the basis for Latin diēs 'day'), Greek Ζῆν (Zên) (reformed after Homeric Greek to Ζῆνα Zêna, subsequently Δία Día), acc. of Ζεύς (Zeús)
- PIE *gʷowm 'cow' (acc. sg.) > *gʷōm > Sanskrit gā́m, acc. sg. of gaús, Greek (Homeric and dialectal) βών (bṓn), acc. sg. of βοῦς (boûs) 'cow'
- acc. sg. of PIE *dom- 'house' is *dṓm, not *dómm̥.
- acc. sg. of PIE *dʰoHn-éh₂ 'grain' after laryngeal colouring is the disyllabic *dʰoHnā́m, not trisyllabic *dʰoHnáh₂m̥ > **dʰoHnā́m̥

== See also ==
- Glossary of sound laws in the Indo-European languages
- Szemerényi's law
