= Szemerényi's law =

Proto-Indo-European language sound law

Szemerényi's law (Hungarian pronunciation: [ˈsɛmɛreːɲi]) is both a sound change and a synchronic phonological rule that operated during an early stage of the Proto-Indo-European language (PIE). Though its effects are evident in many reconstructed as well as attested forms, it did not operate in late PIE, having become morphologized (with exceptions reconstructible via the comparative method). It is named for Hungarian-British linguist Oswald Szemerényi.

== Overview ==
The rule deleted coda fricatives *s or laryngeals *h₁, *h₂ or *h₃ (cover symbol *H), with compensatory lengthening occurring in a word-final position after resonants. In other words:

*/-VRs/, */-VRH/ > *-VːR
*/-VRH-/ > *-VR- (no examples of s-deletion can be reconstructed for PIE)

== Morphological effects ==
The law affected the nominative singular forms of the many masculine and feminine nouns whose stem ended in a resonant:

- PIE *ph₂térs "father" > *ph₂tḗr (Ancient Greek patḗr, Sanskrit pitā́)
- PIE *ǵénh₁tors "parent" > *ǵénh₁tōr (Ancient Greek genétōr, Latin genitor)
- PIE *dʰéǵʰoms "earth" > *dʰéǵʰōm (Ancient Greek khthṓn, Sanskrit kṣa, Hittite te-e-kán)

The rule also affected the nominative-accusative forms of neuter plural/collective nouns, which ended in *-h₂:

- PIE *ǵénh₁monh₂ "seeds" > *ǵénh₁mōn > *ǵénh₁mō (on n-deletion see below)

Also in the third-person plural perfect ending:

- PIE *-ers (the third-person plural perfect ending) > *-ēr (Latin ēr-e, Hittite -er, -ir)

Compare:

- PIE *werh₁-dʰh₁-om "word" > *werdʰh₁om (Latin verbum)

== Further effects ==
According to another synchronic PIE phonological rule, word-final *n was deleted after *ō, usually by the operation of Szemerényi's law:

- PIE *ḱwóns "dog" > *ḱwṓn > *ḱwṓ (Sanskrit ś(u)vā́, Old Irish cú)

The PIE reconstruction for "heart" is the single instance where *d is deleted after *r, with compensatory lengthening of the preceding vowel. It is not clear whether that is an isolated example or a part of a broader process.

- PIE *ḱérd "heart" > *ḱḗr (Ancient Greek kêr, Hittite ker)

== Exceptions ==
Some cases were apparently not affected by Szemerényi's law:

- The accusative plural *-ons of thematic nominals.
- The genitive singular of stems ending in sonorants, such as *déms "of the house" (fossilised in the phrase *dems potis "master of the house").
- Secondary 2nd person singular verb ending *-s with verbs ending in sonorants, such as *gʷéms (from the root *gʷem- "to step, to come").

== Morphologization ==
In PIE, the resulting long vowels had already begun to spread analogically to other nominative singular forms that were not phonologically justified by the law (PIE *pṓds 'foot'). The word-final sonorants other than *-n were sometimes dropped as well, which demonstrates that this law was already morphologized in the period of "PIE proper", and the long vowel produced was no longer synchronically viewed as the outcome of a process of fricative deletion. Exceptions to Szemerényi's law are found in word-final:

- PIE *gʷénh₂s "woman" > *gʷḗn (Old Irish bé) but also *gʷénh₂ (Sanskrit jáni)

as well as medial positions:

- PIE *gen- > Sanskrit janman, PIE *genh₁- > Sanskrit jánitrī

The forms without a laryngeal are considered to be more archaic and were likely to have been lexicalized at a later stage of PIE.

== See also ==
- Glossary of sound laws in the Indo-European languages
- Stang's law
