= Jasanoff =

Jasanoff is a surname. Notable people with the surname include:

- Jay Jasanoff (born 1942), American linguist
- Maya Jasanoff (born 1974), American historian
- Sheila Jasanoff (born 1944), Indian-born American social scientist
