= Proto-Indo-European verbs =

Proto-Indo-European verbs reflect a complex system of morphology, more complicated than the substantive, with verbs categorized according to their aspect, (Note: stative, imperfective, or perfective) using multiple grammatical moods and voices, and being conjugated according to person, number and tense. In addition to finite forms thus formed, non-finite forms such as participles are also extensively used.

The verbal system is clearly represented in Ancient Greek and Vedic Sanskrit, which closely correspond in nearly all aspects of their verbal systems, and are two of the most well-understood of the early daughter languages of Proto-Indo-European.

== Basics ==
The reconstruction of verb conjugation in Proto-Indo-European is controversial. The system described here is known as the "Cowgill–Rix" system, which explains fairly well the data found in most subfamilies of Indo-European. However, this reconstruction encounters significant difficulties when applied to the Anatolian and to some extent the Tocharian branch. (Note: In particular, despite the fact that the Anatolian languages are the earliest-attested IE languages, much of the complexity of the Cowgill–Rix system is absent from them. In addition, contrary to the situation with other languages with relatively simple verbal systems, such as Germanic, there is little or no evidence of the "missing" forms having ever existed. Furthermore, many of the forms that do exist have a significantly different meaning from elsewhere. For example, the PIE perfect/stative conjugation shows up simply as a present-tense conjugation known as the ḫi-present, with no clear meaning; on the other hand, the PIE nu-present, which in other languages is a primary verb suffix with no clear meaning, is in Hittite a productive secondary verb suffix that forms causative verbs. On the other hand, Germanic, among others, has a class of present-tense verbs derived from PIE perfect/stative verbs, and both Germanic and Balto-Slavic have a class of secondary n- verbs with a clear meaning, derived originally from nu- and/or neH- verbs, so it is possible that many of the Anatolian differences are innovations.) For this reason, this system is often thought to have formed not in PIE proper, but at a later stage, after Anatolian and possibly Tocharian had split off. Even so, there is no consensus concerning what the ancestral system of verb conjugation prior to the split-off of Anatolian looked like, and which Anatolian differences are innovations vs. archaisms.

The Cowgill-Rix system involves the interplay of six dimensions (number, person, voice, mood, aspect and tense) with the following variables:

3 numbers	singular, dual, plural
3 persons	first, second, third
2 voices	active, middle (or medio-passive)
4-5 moods	indicative, subjunctive, optative, imperative, possibly injunctive
3 aspects	imperfective ("present"), perfective ("aorist"), stative ("perfect")
2 tenses	present, past ("imperfect")

Further, participles can be considered part of the verbal systems although they are not verbs themselves, and as with other PIE nouns, they can be declined across seven or eight cases, for three genders and three numbers.

== Building blocks ==
=== Roots ===
The starting point for the morphological analysis of the PIE verb is the root. PIE roots are morphemes with lexical meanings, which usually consist of a single vowel flanked by one or more consonants arranged to very specific rules.

=== Stems and stem formation ===
Before the final endings—to denote number, person, etc.—can be applied, additional elements (S) may be added to the root (R). The resulting component here after any such affixion is the stem, to which the final endings (E) can then be added to obtain the conjugated forms. (Note: A clear difference with nominals is that verbs derived directly from roots, with no suffix (or only a thematic vowel), were very common. Such verbs expressed the basic verbal meaning of the root. Various suffixes were available to derive new verbs, either by affixing to the root, or by affixing to an existing verbal or nominal stem.)

$$\underbrace{\underbrace{\mathrm{root+suffix}}_{\mathrm{stem}} + \mathrm{ending}}_{\mathrm{word}}$$

=== Athematic and thematic stems ===
Verbs, like nominals, made a basic distinction based on whether a short, ablauting vowel -e- or -o-, (Note: normally written -e/o-) called the thematic vowel was affixed to the root before the final endings added.

In the case of the thematic conjugations, some of the endings differed depending on whether this vowel was present or absent, but by and large the endings were the same for both types. (Note: The thematic vowel was either e or o, according to a predictable distribution: e appeared before coronal consonants and word-finally (in the second-person singular imperative, which had no ending), and o elsewhere.)

The athematic system is much older and exhibits ablaut within the paradigm. In the descendant languages, athematic verbs were often extended with a thematic vowel, likely because of the complications resulting from the consonant clusters formed when the mostly consonant-initial endings were added directly onto the mostly consonant-final stems.

Consequently, the athematic verbs became a non-productive relic class in the later Indo-European languages. In groups such as Germanic and Italic, the athematic verbs had almost gone entirely extinct by the time of written records, while Sanskrit and Ancient Greek preserve them more clearly.

== Proposed endings ==
At least the following sets of endings existed:

- Primary ("present") endings used for:
  - Present tense of the indicative mood of imperfective verbs.
  - Subjunctive mood
- Secondary ("past" or "tenseless") endings used for:
  - Past tense of the indicative mood of imperfective verbs.
  - Indicative mood of perfective verbs.
  - Optative mood
- Stative endings used for
  - Indicative mood of stative verbs.
- Imperative endings used for
  - Imperative mood of all verbs.

Note that, from a diachronic perspective, the secondary endings were actually the more basic ones, while the primary endings were formed from them by adding a suffix, originally -i in the active voice and -r in the middle voice.

The more central subfamilies of Indo-European have innovated by replacing the middle-voice -r with the -i of the active voice.

Traditional accounts say that the first-person singular primary ending is the only form where athematic verbs used a different ending from thematic verbs. Newer accounts by Sihler (1995) and Ringe (2006) are similar, with the proto-forms modernized using laryngeal notation.

The linguist Andrew Sihler, however, notes that many of the most archaic languages have third-person singular forms missing a t and proposes an alternative t-less thematic ending along with the standard ending. Greek and Balto-Slavic have t-less forms in thematic actives, whereas Vedic and Hittite have t-less athematic middle forms.

Beekes (2011) uses the t-less forms as the starting point for a radical rethinking of the thematic endings, based primarily on Greek and Lithuanian. These proposals are still controversial, however.

=== Active eventive endings ===
		Sihler (1995)	Beekes (2011)	Fortson (2010)	Ringe (2006)
Primary
Singular	1st	*-mi, *-oh₂	*-mi, *-oH	*-mi, *-oh₂	*-mi, *-oh₂
Singular	2nd	*-si	*-si, *-eh₁i	*-si	*-si
Singular	3rd	*-ti, *-i	*-ti, *-e	*-ti	*-ti
Dual	1st	*-wos	*-wes	*-we-	*-wos
Dual	2nd	*-th₁es	*-tHes/*-tHos	*-to-	*-tes
Dual	3rd	*-tes	*-tes	*-to-	*-tes
Plural	1st	*-mos	*-mes, *-omom	*-me-	*-mos
Plural	2nd	*-te	*-th₁e	*-te(-)	*-te
Plural	3rd	*-nti	*-nti, *-o	*-nti	*-nti
Secondary
Singular	1st	*-m	*-m	*-m	*-m
Singular	2nd	*-s	*-s	*-s	*-s
Singular	3rd	*-t	*-t	*-t	*-t
Dual	1st	*-we	*-we	*-we-	*-we
Dual	2nd	*-tom	*-tom	*-to-	*-tom
Dual	3rd	*-tām	*-teh₂m	*-teh₂-	*-tām
Plural	1st	*-me	*-mo/e	*-me-	*-me
Plural	2nd	*-te	*-te	*-te(-)	*-te
Plural	3rd	*-nt, *-(ē)r	*-nt	*-nt	*-nt
Imperative
Singular	1st	—	—	—	—
Singular	2nd	*-∅, *-dʰi	*-∅, *-dʰi, *-tōd	*-∅, *-dʰi	*-∅, *-dʰi, *-tōd
Singular	3rd	*-(t)u	*-tu, *-tōd	*-tu, *-tōd	*-tu (*-tow?), *-tōd
Dual	1st	—	—	—	—
Dual	2nd	?	?	?	*-tom
Dual	3rd	?	?	?	*-tām
Plural	1st	—	—	—	—
Plural	2nd	*-te	*-te, *-tōd	*-te	*-te
Plural	3rd	*-ntu	*-ntu	*-ntu, *-ntōd	*-ntu (*-ntow?)
Participle
		*-ont- ~ *-nt-, *-ont-	*-ent- ~ *-nt-, *-ont-	*-ent- ~ *-nt-, *-ont-	*-ont- ~ *-nt-, *-ont-

=== Middle eventive endings ===
		Sihler (1995)	Beekes (2011)		Fortson (2010)	Ringe (2006)
Primary
Singular	1st	*-h₂or	—		*-h₂er	*-h₂er
Singular	2nd	*-th₂or	—		*-th₂er	*-th₂er
Singular	3rd	*-(t)or	—		*-or	*-(t)or
Dual	1st	*-wosdʰh₂?	—		?	*-wosdʰh₂
Dual	2nd	*-Htoh₁?	—		?	?
Dual	3rd	*-Htē?	—		?	?
Plural	1st	*-mosdʰh₂	—		*-medʰh₂?	*-mosdʰh₂
Plural	2nd	*-dʰh₂wo	—		*-dʰh₂we-?	*-dʰh₂we
Plural	3rd	*-(ē)ror, *-ntor	—		*-ro(r?)	*-ror, *-ntor
Secondary
			Intransitive	Transitive		
Singular	1st	*-h₂o	*-h₂	*-m̥h₂	*-h₂e	*-h₂e
Singular	2nd	*-th₂o	*-th₂o	*-sth₂o	*-th₂e	*-th₂e
Singular	3rd	*-(t)o	*-o	*-to	*-o	*-(t)o
Dual	1st	*-wedʰh₂?	*-wedʰh₂		?	*-wedʰh₂
Dual	2nd	*-teh₁?	*-(e)Hth₁-?		?	?
Dual	3rd	*-tē?	*-(e)Hteh₂?		?	?
Plural	1st	*-medʰh₂	*-medʰh₂	*-me(s)dʰh₂	*-medʰh₂?	*-medʰh₂
Plural	2nd	*-dʰh₂wo	*-dʰh₂we	*-tdʰh₂we	*-dʰh₂we-?	*-dʰh₂we
Plural	3rd	*-(ē)ro, *-nto	*-ro	*-ntro	*-ro	*-ro, *-nto
Imperative
			Intransitive	Transitive		
Singular	1st	—	—		—	—
Singular	2nd	*-so	*-swe?	—	?	?
Singular	3rd	*-to	*-to?	*-o?	?	?
Dual	1st	—	—		—	—
Dual	2nd	?	?		?	?
Dual	3rd	?	?		?	?
Plural	1st	—	—		—	—
Plural	2nd	*-dʰwo	*-dʰwe	—	?	*-dʰh₂we
Plural	3rd	*-nto	*-ro?	*-nto?	?	?
Participle
		*-m(e)no-	*-mh₁no-		*-m(e)no-, *-mh₁no-	*-mh₁no-

=== Stative endings ===
		Sihler (1995)	Beekes (2011)	Fortson (2010)	Ringe (2006)
Indicative
Singular	1st	*-h₂e	*-h₂e	*-h₂e	*-h₂e
Singular	2nd	*-th₂e	*-th₂e	*-th₂e	*-th₂e
Singular	3rd	*-e	*-e	*-e	*-e
Dual	1st	?	?	?	*-we
Dual	2nd	?	?	?	?
Dual	3rd	?	?	?	?
Plural	1st	*-me-	*-me	*-me-	*-me
Plural	2nd	*-e	*-(h₁)e	*-e	*-e
Plural	3rd	*-ēr	*-(ē)r	*-ēr, *-r̥s	*-ēr
Participle
		*-wos- ~ *-us-	*-wos- ~ *-us-	*-wos- ~ *-us-	*-wos- ~ *-us-

A second conjugation has been proposed in Jay Jasanoff's h₂e-conjugation theory. Svensson (2001) suggests *-h₂éy for the second and third dual stative endings, on the basis of evidence from Indo-Iranian, Tocharian, and Gaulish.

== Verb aspects ==
The standard reconstruction of Proto-Indo-European verbal morphology outlines a system primarily defined by aspectual opposition rather than tense. However, in the most ancient attested Indo-European languages, this system had largely faded and a new emphasis on a past—non-past distinction had emerged. The most archaic known Indo-European language, Hittite, primarily distinguishes between past and non-past forms and bears no trace of any earlier aspectual opposition. There are other Indo-European languages that have largely simplified their verbal morphologies, though it is unusual for an exceptionally ancient Indo-European language such as Hittite to bear little trace of the presumed importance of aspect within PIE. According to the linguists Jesse Lundquist and Anthony Yates, the evidence from Hittite implies the existence of an earlier system primarily centered around lexical rather than grammatical aspect. Yates and Lundquist note the wide variety of verbal classes in Core Indo-European that appear to lack much semantic difference, implying a merger of earlier formations.

Proto-Indo-European verbs belonged to one of three aspect classes:

- Stative verbs depicted a state of being.
- Eventive verbs expressed events. These could be further divided between:
  - Perfective verbs depicting actions viewed as punctual, an entire process without attention to internal details, completed as a whole or not completed at all. No distinction in tense was made.
  - Imperfective verbs depicting durative, ongoing or repeated action, with attention to internal details. This included the time of speaking; separate endings were used for present or future events in contrast to past events.

The terminology around the stative, perfective and imperfective aspects can be confusing. The use of these terms here is based on the reconstructed meanings of the corresponding forms in PIE and the terms used broadly in linguistics to refer to aspects with these meanings.

In traditional PIE terminology, the forms described here as stative, perfective and imperfective are known as the perfect, aorist and present systems:

- Stative = Perfect
- Perfective = Aorist
- Imperfective = Present

The present/imperfective system in turn can be conjugated in two tenses, described here as present and past but traditionally known as present and imperfect. The traditional terms are based on the names of the corresponding forms in Ancient Greek (also applied to Sanskrit), and are still commonly encountered. Furthermore, there is a separate secondary-verb form commonly known as the "stative" and marked by a suffix *-eh₁-, which has no connection with the stative/perfect described here.

The following table shows the two systems of terminology.

Process	Aspect	Aspect (traditional name)	Tense	Tense (traditional name)
Stative	Stative	Perfect	(unmarked)	Perfect tense
Eventive	Perfective, punctual	Aorist	(unmarked)	Aorist tense
Eventive	Imperfective, durative	Present	Present	Present tense
Eventive	Imperfective, durative	Present	Past or tenseless	Imperfect tense

In Proto-Indo-European, the aspects had no tense meaning, which later developed in the descendant languages. In Ancient Greek, for example, the perfect carried the meaning of a state resulting from a past action, but the PIE stative referred to the state alone. Likewise, the aorist, though having a tense-like meaning in Ancient Greek, had none in PIE. Perfective and stative verbs were effectively tenseless, or indifferent to time.

=== Eventive verbs ===
The perfective ("aorist") and imperfective ("present") aspect classes are together known as eventive, or verbs that depict events, to distinguish them from stative (verbs that depict a state of being). Broadly, the imperfective described actions with internal structure, be they continuous, iterative, habitual, or any other type. Sihler generalizes the meaning of the imperfective class as durative, meaning that it encompassed continuous actions. This class was further subdivided into present imperfective and past imperfective categories, the former of which denoted actions occurring during the present or the future (i.e., is doing), whereas the latter described actions that were occurring continuously in the past (i.e., was doing). In contrast, the perfective class denoted events without any such structure, perhaps either due to the speaker's lack of care for or knowledge of these details. Sihler ascribes a punctual value to the aorist, meaning that it referred to actions that did not necessarily span over extended periods of time. Since the punctual aspect is generally incompatible with descriptions of present occurrences, it is likely that the aorist largely described past actions.

There was perhaps an association between telic roots, such as *bʰuH- (“to become”), and root aorists, whereas atelic roots, such as *h₁es- (“to be”) were perhaps connected with root presents. However, there are various exceptions that contradict this model. For instance, the roots *peh₃- (“to drink”) and *steh₂- ("to stand"), in spite of seemingly atelic semantics, form a root aorist rather than the expected present. It is theoretically possible to resolve at least some of these issues by presuming that these roots had different original meanings. In the case of *peh₃- and *steh₂-, they perhaps once possessed telic meanings such as "to take a sip" and "to take a stand" respectively. Yet the linguist Daniel Kölligan has criticized these attempts to adjust the semantics of possible counterexamples, arguing that they may constitute circular reasoning—they presume that a root aorist must indicate a telic root because of the theory that root aorists belonged to telic roots. According to the linguist Petr Kocharov, it is ultimately difficult to reconstruct the telicity of any given PIE formation as the corresponding arguments can scarcely be confidently determined. The linguist Andreas Willi has suggested that telicity often emerges in verbal phrases rather than individual terms themselves, perhaps allowing for the context of a sentence to interfere with the perceived telicity of a root. According to this hypothesis, a root such as *gʷeh₂- ("to go"), despite an originally atelic meaning, perhaps came to form a root aorist due to frequent usage in telic phrases. Kölligan has also criticized this hypothesis, arguing that, though this theory necessitates that the motivation underlying the usage of a root in a telic or atelic context did not depend upon inherent feature of the word, it fails to provide an alternative to explain the impetus for choosing any particular context for any root. Moreover, regarding the particular example of the root *gʷeh₂-, it remains unclear why it should form a root aorist while the term *h₁ey- ("to go") formed a root present.

Both types of eventive verb shared the same conjugation, with some small differences. The main difference was that the present imperfective allowed the use of special present-tense (primary) endings, while past imperfective and perfective verbs utilized the default tenseless (secondary) endings. Morphologically, the indicative of perfective verbs was indistinguishable from the past indicative of imperfective verbs, and it is likely that in early stages of PIE, these were the same verb formation. At some point in the history of PIE, the present tense was created by developing the primary endings out of the secondary endings. Not all verbs came to be embellished with these new endings; for semantic reasons, some verbs never had a present tense. These verbs were the perfective verbs, while the ones that did receive a present tense were imperfective.

In Ancient Greek, Armenian and Indo-Iranian, the secondary endings came to be accompanied by a prefixing particle known as the augment, reconstructed as *e- or *h₁e-. The function of the augment is unclear (it is usually thought to be connected to the meaning of 'past'), but it was not a fixed part of the inflection as it was in the later languages. In Homeric Greek and Vedic Sanskrit, many imperfect (past imperfective) and aorist verbs are still found lacking the augment; its use became mandatory only in later Greek and Sanskrit.

=== Stative verbs ===
The stative aspect differed from the eventives by being marked formally with its own personal endings, a participle marked by the element *-wos-, having a root in the singular in o-grade, but elsewhere in zero-grade, and typically by exhibiting reduplication. This class is traditionally known as the perfect, a name which was assigned based upon the Latin tense before the stative nature of the PIE form was fully known. The Proto-Indo-European perfect shows reflexes in various Indo-European branches, including particularly archaic languages such as Ancient Greek. However, the Anatolian branch—the most ancient group of the Indo-European family—does not showcase any attestation of the PIE perfect, though it does contain a class of hi-verbs that displays a similar set of inflectional endings and is perhaps ultimately derived from the same source as the perfect. Nevertheless, the precise details of the relationship between the hi-conjugation class and the perfect remain unclear. According to the linguist Martin Joachim Kümmel, it is perhaps possible that the perfect was an innovation of the 'Core' (i.e., non-Anatolian) Indo-European languages. There are certain lexical items in Hittite that may derive from original Proto-Indo-European stative verbs. For instance, the verb šipānti perhaps reflects a Proto-Indo-European stative *spe-spónd-e, which itself may be the source of Latin spepondī. Kloekhorst, however, doubts this word equation, arguing that, should šipānti have perfect origins, it would likely differ semantically from its counterpart išpānti, yet—according to Kloekhorst—no such difference in meaning exists.

The Hittite hi-verbs do not appear to showcase any semantic difference from the class of m-verbs—they merely function as another type of present verbal formation. Nevertheless, based on the other Indo-European languages, a type of stative verb that signified a current state of being rather than events can perhaps be reconstructed. Unlike the imperfective, only one set of inflectional endings can be reconstructed for the entirety of the perfect paradigm, seemingly without any distinction between forms utilized to describe past and present time. The original present sense of the IE stative is seen in the Germanic preterite-present verbs such as Gothic wait "I know" (< PIE *wóyde "to know," perhaps from “to be in a state as a result of having seen/found”), with exact cognates in Sanskrit véda and Ancient Greek οἶδα (oĩda). Certain lexical archaisms within Homeric Greek may also preserve stative semantics, such as the perfect form τέθνηκε (téthnēke, “is dead”) or ἕστηκε (héstēke, “is standing”). There are also several stative perfects in Latin, such as memini ("to remember"), odi ("to hate"), and novi ("to know"). However, many Proto-Indo-European roots with a seemingly inherent stative meaning, such as *h₁es- ("to be"), formed root presents instead of perfects. Ringe suggests that imperfective verbs perhaps encroached upon the semantic domain of the perfect as states can also be defined as an "event extending over time."

In its most archaic function, the oldest form of the perfect may have expressed a fundamentally subject-oriented, intransitive meaning. For instance, the Ancient Greek perfect τέτοκα (tétoka, "has given birth"), which was primarily used of women, whereas the simplex τίκτω (tíktō, "to beget, give birth") could apply to anyone. It is possible that the default function of the perfect was similar to the middle voice, and it is also possible that the perfect had no separate mediopassive paradigm alongside the set of active inflectional endings. There are no perfect passive inflectional endings in Latin and Gothic and, in Tocharian, the preterite participle—the only surviving remnant of the perfect—is used to express both active and passive meanings. The Indo-Iranian and Greek languages do have separate inflectional endings for the perfect mediopassive, though—according to Drinka—these are an innovation resulting from the grafting of the present middle endings onto the perfect. Consequently, the perfect may have acquired both an active and mediopassive inflection, perhaps allowing for the expression of both transitive and intransitive meanings, which itself possibly enabled the creation of entirely new transitive perfects to terms that previously lacked such forms. Sihler is however more critical of the interpretation of the perfect as intransitive, arguing that archaic stative verbs such as *wóyde showcase transitive meanings. James Clackson notes that, in early Homeric Greek and Vedic Sanskrit, perfect forms with the "active" set of inflectional endings coexist with mediopassive presents. For example, the deponent Greek verb γίγνομαι (gígnomai) forms a perfect γέγονα (gégona) and the deponent Sanskrit verb rócate likewise is associated with an active perfect ruroca.

There is a plethora of attested stative forms in Proto-Indo-European that appear to have designated a state resulting from the completion of a prior action, for instance the stative form *memóne (perhaps "to have in mind, remember" or "is mindful"), which derives from the root *men- ("to think"). According to the linguist Mate Kapović, it is possible that the resultative meaning emerged as a later development—perhaps within late PIE—succeeding an original more purely stative function. Kümmel suggests that the resultative meaning was applied to perfect verbs derived from telic roots. Thus, a root such as *leykʷ- ("to leave") may produce perfects forms such as Ancient Greek λέλοιπα (léloipa) and Sanskrit riréca, both meaning "is gone, has left." According to the Lexikon der Indogermanischen Verben, both of these formations are attributable to a Proto-Indo-European perfect verb of the shape *lelóykʷe. In the case of λέλοιπα (léloipa), the original stative meaning may coexist alongside a newer resultative meaning: The form can mean both "to be missing" and "to have left behind." Alternatively, Sihler argues that the ‘resultative’ view of the perfect is likely inaccurate, as—according to him—resultative semantics are not present in several attested perfects and it is easy to wrangle any predicate to fit a supposedly resultative meaning.

== Other verbal categories ==
=== Voice ===
Verbs originally had two voices: active and mediopassive. In some daughter languages (e.g., Sanskrit) this was supplemented with a passive voice; in others (e.g., Latin) the mediopassive evolved to have a passive meaning for roots that were also used in the active voice, but retained its mediopassive character for so-called deponent roots.

=== Mood ===
The moods of PIE included indicative, imperative, subjunctive, optative and perhaps injunctive.

==== Indicative ====
The indicative mood was the default mood, and, alongside the imperative, the oldest. It was used for simple statements of fact.

- Imperfective verbs. The indicative mood was the only mood to have distinctions in tense in imperfective verbs, all other moods were tenseless.
  - The present tense used the primary endings.
  - The past tense used the secondary endings.
- Perfective verbs
  - The indicative of perfective verbs used secondary endings.
- Stative verbs
  - They used their own, entirely different set of endings in the indicative mood.

==== Imperative ====
The imperative mood was used for commands directed towards other people, and therefore only occurred in the second and third person. It used its own set of special imperative endings.

==== Subjunctive ====
The subjunctive mood was used to describe completely hypothetical events, along the lines of "suppose that I oversleep...". It was also sometimes used for future events (which are by definition hypothetical rather than actual) for this reason.

The subjunctive for athematic verbs was formed via the addition of the thematic vowel to the stem and the corresponding thematic inflectional endings. Thus, the athematic root present *h₁ésti ("to be") had subjunctive forms such as *h₁éseti. The original short-vowel nature of the athematic subjunctive is preserved faithfully in certain Sanskrit and Latin terms. In Latin, for instance, the future forms of the verb sum ("to be") continue the original PIE subjunctive, thus forms such as eris and erit reflect PIE *h₁ésesi and *h₁éseti. Sanskrit terms such as ásati and ásasi also reflect the PIE subjunctive, though Rigvedic Sanskrit additionally contains alternative forms such as ásat and ásaḥ, which display secondary endings instead of the primary endings. It is thus unclear whether the original Proto-Indo-European subjunctive ought to be reconstructed with primary or secondary endings. There are also fragments of the original short-vowel athematic subjunctive in Homeric Greek and in certain other Greek dialects, where terms such as φθίεται (phthíetai, "perished") appear occasionally. However, in Attic Greek, the short-vowel athematic subjunctive was replaced by the long-vowel of the thematic subjunctive, thereby producing forms such as δύνωμαι (dúnōmai), the subjunctive to the athematic verb δύναμαι (dúnamai, "to be able to, capable of").

To form their subjunctives, thematic verbs seemingly doubled the thematic vowel, which contracted into a long vowel. Thus, a verb such as *bʰéreti ("to bear, carry") had subjunctive forms such as *bʰérēti. Ordinary thematic verbs in Greek contain an alternating η (ē)/ω (ō) vowel in the inflectional endings, such as in the forms λύητον (lúēton) and λύωσι (lúōsi). In contrast, in Latin, the future forms for third and fourth conjugation verbs—which also reflect the PIE subjunctive—contain a generalized ē vowel, as in forms such as legēmus. The original PIE subjunctive might be reconstructed with vowel alternation of Greek, in which case the fixed ē-vowel in Latin would have to be the result of a later generalization. However, Sihler argues that such an alternating subjunctive vowel would so closely match the ordinary thematic inflectional endings, that it could only ever be replaced under the pressure of an exceptionally powerful source of analogical influence. Yet, according to Sihler, no such model exists, indicating that the Latin forms more accurately reflect the PIE situation, and the Greek subjunctive secondarily emerged under the influence of the thematic indicative.

According to the linguist Robert Beekes, there is evidence indicating that in the most archaic layers of Indo-European, the subjunctive was once separate from the paradigms of the main verbs. For instance, the athematic subjunctive displays a fixed full-grade even in the mediopassive, whereas the athematic indicative displays ablauting full and zero-grade. Thus, in Sanskrit, even though mediopassive indicative forms such as brūté are consistently zero-grade, mediopassive subjunctive forms such as brávate display the full grade. The discrepancy in ablaut grade implies that the mediopassive subjunctive was a secondary development. Furthermore, in the Vedas, there is evidence for active subjunctive forms besides otherwise mediopassive verbs, such as the active subjunctive várat beside the mediopassive indicative ávri. Certain Archaic Latin and Sanskrit subjunctives appear to have been formed directly from the root, rather than from the stem of the present verb, such as the Sanskrit subjunctive karat(i), which exists beside the verb kṛṇóti ("to do, make"), and also Old Latin forms such as tagam beside the present tangō ("to touch, grasp"). Anatolian contains few if any traces of the PIE subjunctive, and is entirely possible that the formation is a post-PIE development common to the non-Anatolian branches.

==== Optative ====
The optative mood was used for wishes or hopes, like the English "may I sleep well". It was formed with an athematic ablauting suffix -yéh₁- ~ -ih₁- attached to the zero-grade of the stem.

In Vedic Sanskrit, optatives were very rarely found for characterized stems (primary and secondary derivations); most occurrences of the optative are in root verbs. This is taken by Sihler to indicate that the optative was not really a mood in PIE, but a separate verb, and was thus restricted to being derived directly from roots only, not from already-derived verbs. In addition, it appears that in PIE itself, stative verbs did not have the optative mood; it was limited to eventive verbs. Early Indo-Iranian texts mostly lack attestations of stative optative forms.

==== Injunctive ====
The place of the injunctive mood, of obscure function, is debated. It takes the form of the bare root in e-grade with secondary endings, without the prefixed augment that was common to forms with secondary endings in these languages. The injunctive was thus entirely without tense marking. This causes Fortson (among others) to suggest that the use of the injunctive was for gnomic expressions (as in Homer) or in otherwise timeless statements (as in Vedic).

== Verb formation ==
From any particular root, verbs could be derived in a variety of means.

In the most conservative Indo-European languages (e.g., Ancient Greek, Sanskrit, Tocharian, Old Irish), there is a separate set of conjugational classes for each of the tense/aspect categories, with no general relationship obtaining between the class of a given verb in one category relative to another. The oldest stages of these languages (especially Vedic Sanskrit) reveal clear remains of an even less organized system, where a given verb root might have multiple ways, or no way at all, of being conjugated in a given tense/aspect category—sometimes with meanings that differ in unpredictable ways.

This clearly suggests that the tense/aspect categories originated as separate lexical verbs, part of a system of derivational morphology (compare the related verbs "to rise" and "to raise", or the abstract nouns "produce", "product", "production" derived from the verb "to produce"), and only gradually became integrated into a coherent system of inflectional morphology, which was still incomplete at the time of the proto-language.

There were a variety of means by which new verbs could be derived from existing verbal roots, as well as from fully formed nominals. Most of these involved adding a suffix to the root (or stem), but there were a few more peculiar formations. One formation that was relatively productive for forming imperfective verbs, but especially stative verbs, was reduplication, in which the initial consonants of the root were duplicated. Very few roots in Proto-Indo-European can be reconstructed that display a sequence of two identical consonants surrounding a vowel, though there are several exceptions, such as *ses-. Regardless, given the rarity of such roots, it is possible that any sequence of two identical consonants flanking a central vowel would have immediately been recognized as a reduplicated form, possibly explaining the widespread use of reduplication as a morphological marker in Proto-Indo-European. Another notable way of forming imperfective verbs was the nasal infix, which was inserted within the root itself rather than affixed to it.

=== Root verbs ===
The most basic verb formation was derived directly from the root, with no suffix, and expressed the meaning of the root itself. Such "root verbs" could be either athematic or thematic; it was not predictable which type was used. The aspect of a root verb was determined by the root itself, which had its own "root aspect" inherent in the basic meaning of the root. Thus, there were verbal roots whose default meaning was durative, ongoing, or iterative, and verbs derived from them were generally imperfective in aspect. Roots whose meaning was punctiliar or discrete created perfective-aspect verbs. Stative roots were rare; perhaps the only reconstructible stative root verb was *wóyd- "know".

There are numerous unexplained surprises in this system, however. The common root *h₁es- meant "to be", which is an archetypically stative notion. Yet, aspect-wise, it was an imperfective root, and thus formed an imperfective root verb *h₁és-ti, rather than a stative verb.

=== Primary derivations ===
In early PIE, the aspect system was less well-developed, and root verbs were simply used in their root aspects, with various derivational formations available for expressing more specific nuances. By late PIE, however, as the aspect system evolved, the need had arisen for verbs of a different aspect than that of the root. Several of the formations, which originally formed distinct verbs, gradually came to be used as "aspect switching" derivations, whose primary purpose was to create a verb of one aspect from a root of another aspect.

This led to a fundamental distinction in PIE verb formations, between primary and secondary formations. Primary formations included the root verbs and the derivational formations that came to be used as aspect switching devices, while secondary formations remained strictly derivational and retained significant semantic value. For example, the secondary suffix *-éye- derived causative verbs, and retained this purpose and meaning throughout the descendants of PIE. The common primary suffix *-ye-, however, came to be used for the majority of verb formations in Latin, without any discernible meaning being conveyed by the suffix; its function had become purely morphological.

A verb needed no derivational or aspect-switching markers for its own root aspect. Affixes of various types were used to switch the inherent aspect to a different type. Such affixes created "characterized" verb formations, contrasting with the basic "root" or "uncharacterized" formation. Examples of aspect switching affixes include -yé-, -sḱé-, and the nasal infix, all of which were used to derive imperfective verbs from roots whose inherent aspect was not already imperfective. Conversely, the "s-aorist" formation (retained most notably in Greek) used the suffix -s- to create perfective verbs. Many roots were "hyper-characterized", however, with an aspect marker added to a root that already had the correct aspect. This may have been done in order to emphasize the aspect. For example, the s-aorist also seemed to have been used when the verb root was inherently perfective already.

A root did not necessarily have verbs to express all three aspects. There were many roots that seem to have had verbs for only one or two aspects in PIE. For example, the root *h₁es- "to be" seems to have formed only an imperfective verb, no perfective or stative verbs derived from this root can be reconstructed. Various later languages amended this situation differently as needed, often by using entirely different roots (suppletion). Latin used the root *bʰuH- "to become" to fill in as the perfective aspect of *h₁es-, while the Germanic languages used the root *h₂wes- "to live, to reside" in that role.

While several aspect switchers were available to be added to the root, particular markers were not exclusively assigned to any root. Certain roots did show a preference for the same markers in multiple daughter languages, but the use of a particular marker was not exclusive, and a variety of formations are often found for the same root. For example, the basic root for "stand", *steh₂-, was a perfective root. Therefore, the root verb had the punctual sense of "come to a standing position; to rise from a sitting position". In order to speak about "standing" in a present, durative sense ("be in a standing position"), the root verb required a derivational marker to put it into the imperfective aspect. For this root, the imperfective aspect switcher was often reduplication (Ancient Greek hístēmi, Sankskrit tíṣṭhati), but the Germanic languages also show a nasal infix or suffix for this root (Gothic present ik standa vs. preterite ik stōþ), at least by a later period. The Slavic languages, meanwhile, also have a form derived with the -yé- suffix. Such discrepancies suggest that in PIE proper, this root had no imperfective verb at all, and the aspect-switched verbs we see in the later descendants were formed independently of each other.

Many primary formations retained some "residue" of their original derivational function and meaning, and significant relics of this earlier derivational system can be reconstructed for PIE. The perfective root *gʷem- "to step" is reconstructible with two different imperfective derivations: *gʷm̥-sḱé- (Ancient Greek báskō, Sanskrit gácchati) and *gʷm̥-yé- (Ancient Greek baínō, Latin veniō). Both formations survived side by side in Greek, suggesting that they did not overlap significantly enough in meaning throughout their history for one or the other to fall out of use.

=== Secondary derivations ===
Secondary verbs were formed either from primary verb roots (so-called deverbal verbs) or from nouns (denominal verbs or denominative verbs) or adjectives (deadjectival verbs). (In practice, the term denominative verb is often used to incorporate formations based on both nouns and adjectives because PIE nouns and adjectives had the same suffixes and endings, and the same processes were used to form verbs from both nouns and adjectives.) Deverbal formations included causative ("I had someone do something"), iterative/inceptive ("I did something repeatedly"/"I began to do something"), desiderative ("I want to do something").

The formation of secondary verbs remained part of the derivational system and did not necessarily have completely predictable meanings (compare the remnants of causative constructions in English—to fall vs. to fell, to sit vs. to set, to rise vs. to raise and to rear).

They are distinguished from the primary formations by the fact that they generally are part of the derivational rather than inflectional morphology system in the daughter languages. However, as mentioned above, this distinction was only beginning to develop in PIE. Not surprisingly, some of these formations have become part of the inflectional system in particular daughter languages. Probably the most common example is the future tense, which exists in many daughter languages but in forms that are not cognate, and tend to reflect either the PIE subjunctive or a PIE desiderative formation.

Secondary verbs were always imperfective, and had no corresponding perfective or stative verbs, nor was it possible (at least within PIE) to derive such verbs from them. This was a basic constraint in the verbal system that prohibited applying a derived form to an already-derived form. Evidence from the Rig Veda (the earliest attestation of Sanskrit) indicates that secondary verbs in PIE were not conjugated in the subjunctive or optative moods. This suggests that these moods follow the same constraint, and are derivational in origin. The later Indo-European languages worked around these limitations, but each in their own way.

== Formation types ==
The following gives a list of the most common verb types reconstructed for (late) PIE.

=== Primary imperfective ===
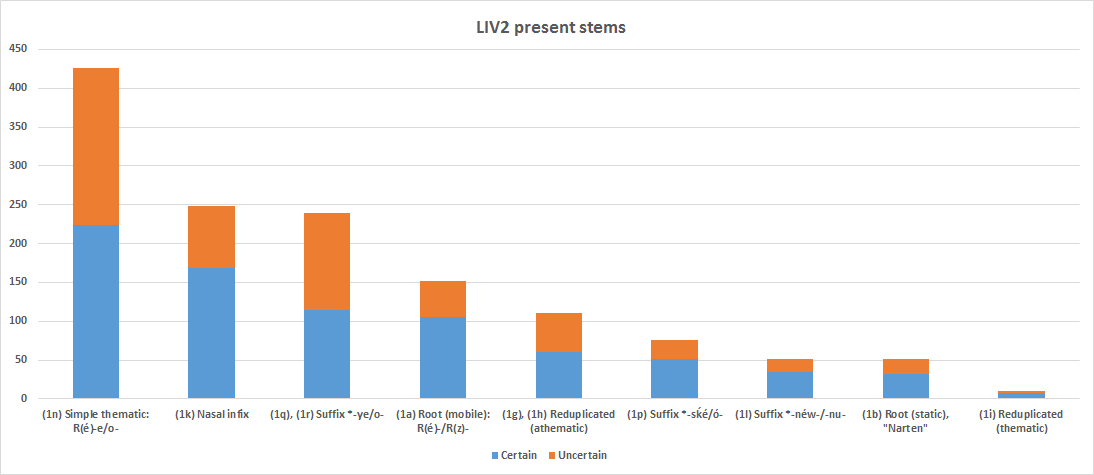
The most common present stems types according to LIV^{2}.

==== Root athematic ====
Also called "simple athematic", this formation derived imperfective verbs directly from a root. It can be divided into two subtypes:

1. Normal type: *(é)-ti ~ *(∅)-énti. Alternating between accented e-grade root, and zero-grade root with accent on the endings.
2. Narten type: *(ḗ/é)-ti ~ *(é)-nti. Also called acrostatic presents, this type is defined by a fixed root-accent and alternating lengthened e-grade in the singular and regular e-grade in the plural.

The normal type is the most common by far.

Examples: *h₁ésti.

==== Root thematic ====
This class functioned the same as the root athematic verbs. There were also two types:

1. simple thematic type: *(é)-eti ~ *(é)-onti. Accented e-grade root.
2. tudati type: *(∅)-éti ~ *(∅)-ónti. Zero-grade root, accent on theme vowel.

The "tudati" type is named after the Sanskrit verb that typifies this formation. It is much rarer than the normal type. The imperfect form of the tudati-type present is identical with the thematic aorist, perhaps indicating that zero-grade root presents emerged from such aorists. It is perhaps possible that zero-grade root presents existed in the Anatolian branch, as Hittite šuwe-zzi ("to push, shove") may reflect a Proto-Indo-European tudati-present of the shape *suh₁-é-ti. However, due to the lack of other thematic formations in Hittite, the philologist Alwin Kloekhorst prefers to derive the Hittite term from *sHu-yé-.

Examples: *bʰéreti.

==== Reduplicated presents ====
===== Reduplicated athematic =====
The root is prefixed with a copy of the initial consonant(s) of the root, separated by a vowel. The accent was perhaps fixed on this prefix, but the root grade alternates as in root athematic verbs. The vowel can be either e or i:

1. e-reduplication: *(é)-(e)-ti ~ *(é)-(∅)-nti
2. i-reduplication: *(í)-(e)-ti ~ *(í)-(∅)-nti

Examples: *h₁íh₁eyǵʰti, *dédeh₃ti

===== Reduplicated thematic =====
*(í)-(∅)-eti ~ *(í)-(∅)-onti. Like the athematic equivalent, but the vowel is i and the root is in zero-grade.

Examples: *sísdeti.

==== éy-presents ====
*(∅)-éy-ti ~ (∅)-y-énti. Athematic, affixed to the zero-grade of the root, with an ablauting suffix. The accent varies between the suffix in the strong stem and the inflectional endings in the weak stem.

Examples: *tḱéyti

==== Nasal infix ====
*(né)-ti ~ *(n)-énti. This peculiar formation consists of an infix -né- ~ -n- that is inserted before final consonant of the zero-grade root, and inflected with athematic inflection. The infix itself ablauts like root athematic verbs. This formation is limited to roots ending in a stop or laryngeal, and containing a non-initial sonorant. This sonorant is always syllabified in the zero-grade, the infix is never syllabic.

Examples: *linékʷti, *tl̥néh₂ti.

==== nw-suffix ====
*(∅)-néw-ti ~ *(∅)-nw-énti. Formed with an ablauting athematic suffix *-néw- ~ *-nw- attached to the root. These are sometimes considered to be a special case of the nasal-infix type.

Examples: *tn̥néwti.

==== ye-suffix ====
This thematic formation exists in two types:

1. *(é)-y-eti ~ *(é)-y-onti. Accented root in e-grade.
2. *(∅)-y-éti ~ *(∅)-y-ónti. Zero-grade root with accent on the thematic vowel.

Examples: *swidyéti, *gʷʰédʰyeti.

==== sḱé-suffix ====
*(∅)-sḱ-éti ~ *(∅)-sḱ-ónti. Thematic, with zero-grade root and accent on the suffix.

Examples: *gʷm̥sḱéti, *pr̥sḱéti.

==== s-suffix ====
*(é)-s-eti ~ *(é)-s-onti. Thematic, with accented e-grade root. There are a scant number of terms in the Indo-European languages that attest to the thematic formation, though Fortson cites examples such as ἀέξω (aéxō). Kölligan and Jasanoff, however, explain this form as derived from an original sigmatic desiderative.

Examples: *h₂lékseti.

=== Secondary imperfective ===
==== eh₁-stative ====
*(∅)-éh₁-ti ~ *(∅)-éh₁-n̥ti. This formed secondary stative verbs. In daughter languages, this suffix is varyingly utilized to form new terms from both verbal and adjectival roots. For instance, the Hittite verb maršē-^{zi} (“to be desecrated”) is perhaps derived from the adjective marš-a- (“deceitful, unholy”), and the Latin stative albēre (“to be white”) coexists with the adjective albus (“white”). Moreover, these verbs were often associated with roots that also formed Caland-system adjectives. For example, the root *h₁rewdʰ- formed a Caland-adjective *h₁rudʰrós and a stative verb *h₁rudʰéh₁ti. Despite their stative meaning, these verbs were, nonetheless, imperfective. This suffix was thematicised in most descendants with a -ye- extension, thus -éh₁ye- as attested in most daughter languages. It is unclear if the verb ablauted; most indications are that it did not, but there are some hints that the zero-grade did occur in a few places (Latin past participle, Germanic class 3 weak verbs). Some scholars, including the editors of the Lexikon der indogermanischen Verben, believe that the eh₁-stem was originally an aorist stem with 'fientive' meaning ('to become X'), whereas the -ye- extension created the present with 'essive' meaning, 'to be x'.

Examples: *h₁rudʰéh₁ti.

==== éye-causative/iterative ====
*(o)-éye-ti ~ *(o)-éyo-nti. Thematic, affixed to the o-grade of the root, with accent on the suffix.

Examples: *sodéyeti, *h₃roǵéyeti, *monéyeti.

==== Desiderative formations ====
===== (h₁)se-desiderative =====
This thematic suffix formed desiderative verbs, meaning "to want to do". Two formations are attested:

1. *(é)-(h₁)s-eti ~ *(é)-(h₁)s-onti. Accented full grade of the root.
2. *(í)-(∅)-(h₁)s-eti ~ *(í)-(∅)-(h₁)s-onti. Reduplicated with i, accent on the reduplicated prefix, zero-grade root.

Examples: *wéydseti, *ḱíḱl̥h₁seti.

===== sye-desiderative =====
*(∅)-sy-éti ~ *(∅)-sy-ónti. Alternatively, Lundquist and Yates reconstruct the suffix as *h₁s-ye-ti. Regardless, it is similar to above, but perhaps with an accented thematic vowel and zero-grade root. This verbal formation is reflected in the Sanskrit future-forming suffix -syáti and possibly also the Lithuanian future paradigm. Given the restriction to one specific area of the Indo-European world, it may have been a dialectal regionalism within the proto-language.

Examples: *bʰuHsyéti.

==== dʰ-presents ====
*(é)-dʰeti ~ *(é)-dʰonti. Thematic, with a full-grade accented root.

Examples: *pléh₁dʰeti

==== ye-denominative ====
*-y-eti ~ *-y-onti. Ringe provides a pre-form of the shape *y-éti ~ *y-ónti, in which case the accent would be placed upon the suffix. Other Indo-Europeanists, however, do not specify the accent—Sihler, Kloekhorst, and Melchert all reconstruct *-y-eti ~ *y-onti.

Examples: *h₂ḱh₂owsyéti

==== h₂-factitive ====
*-h₂-ti ~ *-h₂-n̥ti. This formed transitive factitive verbs from thematic adjective stems. As above, the thematic vowel was retained, as e. For instance, the adjective *néwos may have produced a factitive form of the shape *néwe-h₂ti, though Beekes expresses doubt regarding the antiquity of this form, arguing that the adduced forms may constitute parallel innovations. Regardless, this type of verbal formation remained productive in Hittite, where it was continued as the suffix -aḫḫ-^{i}. However, in various other daughter languages, it was replaced by or conflated with the denominative suffix *-eh₂yé-.

Examples: *néweh₂ti.

==== ye-factitive ====
*-y-éti ~ *-y-ónti. Very similar to the denominative, but formed from adjectives only. The thematic vowel is retained, but this time as o. The existence of this type in PIE is uncertain.

=== Perfective ===
==== Root athematic ====
*(é)-t ~ *(∅)-ént. According to Ringe, this type was the most common aoristic formation in Proto-Indo-European. It was formed similarly to root athematic verbs, though it had secondary endings.

Examples: *gʷémt, *léykʷt, *bʰúHt.

==== Root thematic ====
*(∅)-ét ~ *(∅)-ónt. The formation seemed to have zero-grade of the root and accent on the thematic vowel, like the tudati type.

Examples: *likʷét.

==== Reduplicated thematic ====
*(é)-(∅)-et ~ *(é)-(∅)-ont. This formation utilized e-reduplication, with the accent on the initial reduplicant, the root in the zero-grade, and the thematic inflectional endings.

Examples: *wéwket.

==== s-suffix ====
*(ḗ)-s-t ~ *(é)-s-n̥t. Inflected as the "Narten" athematic type, with lengthened grade in the singular and fixed accent.

Examples: *dḗyḱst,*wḗǵʰst.

=== Stative ===
==== Root ====
*(ó)-e ~ *(∅)-ḗr. The only reconstructable Proto-Indo-European root perfect is *wóyde. It is perhaps possible that the verb *wóyde had emerged from the loss of reduplication, in which the original reduplicated paradigm may be preserved by Sanskrit vidvāṃs, Ancient Greek εἰδώς (eidṓs), and Gothic weitwods—all of which are perfect participles. However, Sihler argues that it is more likely that these participles were created innovatively according to the more regular model of reduplicated perfects found throughout these languages. Moreover, there is, in Hittite, a class of hi-verbs that showcases similar ablaut gradation and endings to that of the unduplicated stative, perhaps indicating that this formation was of great antiquity within PIE. Still, it is quite possible that the Hittite hi-class of verbs is not the direct continuation of the root perfect type, as many hi-verbs do not showcase perfect semantics. There are several Hittite hi-verbs that do display stative meanings: šākki ("knows") and dākki ("resembles"). However, there is also a great multitude of hi-verbs that can describe the same non-stative functions as those covered by the mi-conjugation.

Examples: *wóyde.

==== Reduplicated ====
*(e)-(ó)-e ~ *(e)-(∅)-ḗr. Whereas the ablaut alternation of an o-grade singular and a zero-grade plural is unique and likely archaic, the connection between o-grade vocalism and reduplication is perhaps not equally as ancient. Reduplication as a morphological marker for the perfect is most prevalent in Greek, Phrygian, Indo-Iranian, and the participles of Tocharian. There is more limited, yet still considerable, evidence for reduplicated perfects in the Italic, Celtic and Germanic branches. However, there is scant evidence for reduplicated perfects in Armenian, Albanian, Balto-Slavic and Hittite. Based on the supposed paucity of reduplicated forms in these branches, Drinka suggests that the reduplicated perfect was likely not particularly productive, though still present, in the earliest forms of Proto-Indo-European. According to this model, the almost exclusive usage of reduplication as the marker of the perfect tense was perhaps a development restricted to Indo-Iranian and Greek. In contrast, Jasanoff notes the existence of a reduplicated Hittite form wewakk- ("demand"), which may derive from a reduplicated stative *we-wóḱ-e, perhaps whence also Sanskrit vavákṣi. If this word equation is accepted, it would imply the existence of the reduplicated stative class in archaic Proto-Indo-European. Kloekhorst, however, considers the connection between wewakk- and the Proto-Indo-European perfect to lack "merit," as the Hittite verb is semantically iterative-intensive, not stative. According to Kloekhorst, the term is better classified as an innovative formation aligned with the productive class of reduplicated iterative-intensive verbs in Hittite.

Examples: *bʰebʰówdʰe, *gʷegʷóme.

== Examples ==
=== *leykʷ- ===
The following is an example paradigm, based on Ringe (2006), of the verb *leykʷ-, "leave behind" (athematic nasal-infixed present, root aorist, reduplicated perfect). Two sets of endings are provided for the primary medio-passive forms (subjunctive and primary indicative) — the central dialects (Indo-Iranian, Greek, Germanic, Balto-Slavic, Albanian and Armenian) use forms ending in *y, while the peripheral dialects (Italic, Celtic, Hittite and Tocharian) use forms ending in *r, which are generally considered the original forms.

Ringe makes certain assumptions about synchronic PIE phonology that are not universally accepted:

1. Sievers' Law applies in all positions and to all resonants, including i, *u, *r, *l, *n, *m.
2. Word-final *t becomes *d when adjacent to a voiced segment (i.e., vowel or voiced consonant).

The effects of the generally accepted synchronic boukólos rule whereby *kʷ becomes *k next to *u or *w are shown.

Imperfective nasal-infix verb
Active voice
	Present indic.	Past indic.	Subjunctive	Optative	Imperative
1 sg.	*linékʷmi	*linékʷm̥	*linékʷoh₂	*linkʷyéh₁m	—
2 sg.	*linékʷsi	*linékʷs	*linékʷesi	*linkʷyéh₁s	*linékʷ, *linkʷdʰí
3 sg.	*linékʷti	*linékʷt	*linékʷeti	*linkʷyéh₁t	*linékʷtu
1 du.	*linkwós	*linkwé	*linékʷowos	*linkʷih₁wé	—
2 du.	*linkʷtés	*linkʷtóm	*linékʷetes	*linkʷih₁tóm	*linkʷtóm
3 du.	*linkʷtés	*linkʷtā́m	*linékʷetes	*linkʷih₁tā́m	*linkʷtā́m
1 pl.	*linkʷm̥ós	*linkʷm̥é	*linékʷomos	*linkʷih₁mé	—
2 pl.	*linkʷté	*linkʷté	*linékʷete	*linkʷih₁té	*linkʷté
3 pl.	*linkʷénti	*linkʷénd	*linékʷonti	*linkʷih₁énd	*linkʷéntu
participle	*linkʷónts, *linkʷn̥tés; *linkʷóntih₂, *linkʷn̥tyéh₂s				
Middle voice
	Present indic.	Past indic.	Subjunctive	Optative	Imperative
1 sg.	*linkʷh₂ér, *-h₂éy	*linkʷh₂é	*linékʷoh₂er, *-oh₂ey	*linkʷih₁h₂é	—
2 sg.	*linkʷth₂ér, *-th₂éy	*linkʷth₂é	*linékʷeth₂er, *-eth₂ey	*linkʷih₁th₂é	?
3 sg.	*linkʷtór, *-tóy	*linkʷtó	*linékʷetor, *-etoy	*linkʷih₁tó	?
1 du.	*linkwósdʰh₂	*linkwédʰh₂	*linékʷowosdʰh₂	*linkʷih₁wédʰh₂	—
2 du.	?	?	?	?	?
3 du.	?	?	?	?	?
1 pl.	*linkʷm̥ósdʰh₂	*linkʷm̥édʰh₂	*linékʷomosdʰh₂	*linkʷih₁médʰh₂	—
2 pl.	*linkʷdʰh₂wé	*linkʷdʰh₂wé	*linékʷedʰh₂we	*linkʷih₁dʰh₂wé	*linkʷdʰh₂wé
3 pl.	*linkʷn̥tór, *-n̥tóy	*linkʷn̥tó	*linékʷontor, *-ontoy	*linkʷih₁ró	?
participle	*linkʷm̥h₁nós				

Perfective root athematic verb
Active voice
	Indicative	Subjunctive	Optative	Imperative
1 sg.	*léykʷm̥	*léykʷoh₂	*likʷyéh₁m	—
2 sg.	*léykʷs	*léykʷesi	*likʷyéh₁s	*léykʷ, *likʷdʰí
3 sg.	*léykʷt	*léykʷeti	*likʷyéh₁t	*léykʷtu
1 du.	*likwé	*léykʷowos	*likʷih₁wé	—
2 du.	*likʷtóm	*léykʷetes	*likʷih₁tóm	*likʷtóm
3 du.	*likʷtā́m	*léykʷetes	*likʷih₁tā́m	*likʷtā́m
1 pl.	*likʷmé	*léykʷomos	*likʷih₁mé	—
2 pl.	*likʷté	*léykʷete	*likʷih₁té	*likʷté
3 pl.	*likʷénd	*léykʷonti	*likʷih₁énd	*likʷéntu
participle	*likʷónts, *likʷn̥tés; *likʷóntih₂, *likʷn̥tyéh₂s			
Middle voice
	Indicative	Subjunctive	Optative	Imperative
1 sg.	*likʷh₂é	*léykʷoh₂er, *-oh₂ey	*likʷih₁h₂é	—
2 sg.	*likʷth₂é	*léykʷeth₂er, *-eth₂ey	*likʷih₁th₂é	?
3 sg.	*likʷtó	*léykʷetor, *-etoy	*likʷih₁tó	?
1 du.	*likwédʰh₂	*léykʷowosdʰh₂	*likʷih₁wédʰh₂	—
2 du.	?	?	?	?
3 du.	?	?	?	?
1 pl.	*likʷmédʰh₂	*léykʷomosdʰh₂	*likʷih₁médʰh₂	—
2 pl.	*likʷdʰh₂wé	*léykʷedʰh₂we	*likʷih₁dʰh₂wé	*likʷdʰh₂wé
3 pl.	*likʷn̥tó	*léykʷontor, *-ontoy	*likʷih₁ró	?
participle	*likʷm̥h₁nós			

Reduplicated stative verb
	Indicative	Subjunctive	Optative	Imperative
1 sg.	*lelóykʷh₂e	*leléykʷoh₂	*lelikʷyéh₁m	—
2 sg.	*lelóykʷth₂e	*leléykʷesi	*lelikʷyéh₁s	?, *lelikʷdʰí
3 sg.	*lelóykʷe	*leléykʷeti	*lelikʷyéh₁t	?
1 du.	*lelikwé	*leléykʷowos	*lelikʷih₁wé	—
2 du.	?	*leléykʷetes	*lelikʷih₁tóm	?
3 du.	?	*leléykʷetes	*lelikʷih₁tā́m	?
1 pl.	*lelikʷmé	*leléykʷomos	*lelikʷih₁mé	—
2 pl.	*lelikʷé	*leléykʷete	*lelikʷih₁té	?
3 pl.	*lelikʷḗr	*leléykʷonti	*lelikʷih₁énd	?
participle	*lelikwṓs, *lelikusés; *lelikwósih₂, *lelikusyéh₂s			

=== *bʰer- ===
The following is an example paradigm, based on Ringe (2006), of the verb *bʰer- "carry" in the simple thematic present tense. Two sets of endings are provided for the primary middle forms, as described above.

The above assumptions about PIE phonology apply, in addition to a rule that deletes laryngeals which occur in the sequence -oRHC or -oRH#, where R stands for any resonant, H any laryngeal, C any consonant and # the end of a word. The most important effect of this rule is to delete most occurrences of *h₁ in the thematic optative.

Imperfective root thematic verb
Active voice
	Present indic.	Past indic.	Subjunctive	Optative	Imperative
1 sg.	*bʰéroh₂	*bʰérom	*bʰérōh₂	*bʰéroyh₁m̥	—
2 sg.	*bʰéresi	*bʰéres	*bʰérēsi	*bʰéroys	*bʰére
3 sg.	*bʰéreti	*bʰéred	*bʰérēti	*bʰéroyd	*bʰéretu
1 du.	*bʰérowos	*bʰérowe	*bʰérōwos	*bʰéroywe	—
2 du.	*bʰéretes	*bʰéretom	*bʰérētes	*bʰéroytom	*bʰéretom
3 du.	*bʰéretes	*bʰéretām	*bʰérētes	*bʰéroytām	*bʰéretām
1 pl.	*bʰéromos	*bʰérome	*bʰérōmos	*bʰéroyme	—
2 pl.	*bʰérete	*bʰérete	*bʰérēte	*bʰéroyte	*bʰérete
3 pl.	*bʰéronti	*bʰérond	*bʰérōnti	*bʰéroyh₁end	*bʰérontu
participle	*bʰéronts, *bʰérontos; *bʰérontih₂, *bʰérontieh₂s				
Middle voice
	Present indic.	Past indic.	Subjunctive	Optative	Imperative
1 sg.	*bʰéroh₂er, *-oh₂ey	*bʰéroh₂e	*bʰérōh₂er, *-ōh₂ey	*bʰéroyh₂e	—
2 sg.	*bʰéreth₂er, *-eth₂ey	*bʰéreth₂e	*bʰérēth₂er, *-ēth₂ey	*bʰéroyth₂e	?
3 sg.	*bʰéretor, *-etoy	*bʰéreto	*bʰérētor, *-ētoy	*bʰéroyto	?
1 du.	*bʰérowosdʰh₂	*bʰérowedʰh₂	*bʰérōwosdʰh₂	*bʰéroywedʰh₂	—
2 du.	?	?	?	?	?
3 du.	?	?	?	?	?
1 pl.	*bʰéromosdʰh₂	*bʰéromedʰh₂	*bʰérōmosdʰh₂	*bʰéroymedʰh₂	—
2 pl.	*bʰéredʰh₂we	*bʰéredʰh₂we	*bʰérēdʰh₂we	*bʰéroydʰh₂we	*bʰéredʰh₂we
3 pl.	*bʰérontor, *-ontoy	*bʰéronto	*bʰérōntor, *-ōntoy	*bʰéroyro	?
participle	*bʰéromnos (< *-o-mh₁no-s)				

== Post-PIE developments ==
The various verb formations came to be reorganised in the daughter languages. The tendency was for various forms to become integrated into a single "paradigm" which combined verbs of different aspects into a coherent whole. This process proceeded in steps:

1. Combining different forms with similar meanings into a system of three major aspects. The result of this was the so-called "Cowgill–Rix" system described above, which was completed in late PIE, shortly after Tocharian had split off and well after the Anatolian split. At this stage, formations that originally had various purposes had their semantics largely harmonized into one of the aspect classes, with a clear distinction between primary and secondary derivations. These formations, however, were still separate lexical verbs, still sometimes with idiosyncratic meanings, and for a given aspect a root could still form multiple verbs or no verbs in that particular aspect. This is the stage visible in early Vedic Sanskrit.
2. Combining the various aspects under a single unified verb, with a clear distinction between inflectional and derivational forms. This involved pruning multiple verbs formed from the same root with the same aspect, and creating new verbs for aspects that were missing for certain roots. At this stage a single verb was defined by a set of principal parts, each of which (approximately) defined the type of formation used in each of its aspects. This stage was in process in Vedic Sanskrit and was largely completed in Ancient Greek, although even in this language there are still verbs lacking some of the aspects, as well as occasional multiple formations for the same aspect, with distinct and idiosyncratic meanings. Many remnants of this stage are also found in Old Church Slavonic, which still had distinct stems for the present, aorist and infinitive/participle. Most Slavic languages later lost the aorist, but verbs still have distinct (and unpredictable) present and infinitive stems up to the present day.
3. Regularizing the formations into "conjugations" that applied across the whole system, so that a verb belonged to a single conjugational class rather than one class for each aspect formation. This stage was partly complete in Latin, in particular in regards to the -āre, -ēre, -īre (first, second, fourth) conjugations. The older system, however, is still clearly visible in the -ere class, with each verb in this class, and some in the other classes, needing to be defined by separate present, perfect and supine formations.
  In Proto-Germanic, this process seemed to have been largely completed, with only a few relic formations such as j-presents and n-infix presents remaining as "irregular" verbs. However, a clear distinction was still maintained between primary and secondary verbs, since the lack of multiple aspect stems in the latter eventually led to the creation of the weak verbs, with most of the original primary verbs becoming strong verbs. A small minority of statives retained their perfect/stative inflection, becoming the preterite-present verbs.
4. Gradual reduction in the number of conjugational classes, as well as the number of productive classes. This development is very clearly attested in the later Germanic languages. Afrikaans is an extreme example, where almost all verbs follow the same conjugational pattern. English is also a strong example, where all weak verb classes have merged, many older strong verbs have become weak, and all other verbs are considered irregular relic formations. Dutch and German also show this development, but the non-productive strong verb classes have remained more regular. Swedish still retains two weak verb classes, although only one is productive.
  In the Romance languages, these developments have also occurred, but to a lesser degree. The classes -āre -ēre -ere -īre remain productive; the fourth (-īre) though is generally only marginally productive.

The gradual tendency in all of the daughter languages was to proceed through the stages just described, creating a single conjugational system that applied to all tenses and aspects and allowing all verbs, including secondary verbs, to be conjugated in all inflectional categories. Generally, the primary verbs were largely all lumped together into a single conjugation (e.g., the Latin -ere conjugation), while different secondary-verb formations produced all other conjugations; for the most part, only these latter conjugations were productive in the daughter languages. In most languages, the original distinction between primary and secondary verbs was obscured to some extent, with some primary verbs scattered among the nominally secondary/productive conjugations. Germanic is perhaps the family with the clearest primary/secondary distinction: Nearly all "strong verbs" are primary in origin while nearly all "weak verbs" are secondary, with the two classes clearly distinguished in their past-tense and past-participle formations.

=== Developments of the various verb classes ===
NOTE: A blank space means the reflex of the given class in the given language is undetermined.

Primary imperfective
PIE	Sanskrit	Greek	Latin	Germ	OCS	Lith	OIr	Arm	Alb	Toch	Hitt
Root athematic	class II (130)	two-syllable -mi verbs (9)	4 or 5 verbs	"to be" (*immi), "to do/put" (*dōmi)	class V (4 -mĭ verbs)	-mi verbs in OLith.			3 verbs	class I	common
Root thematic	2a: class I; 2b: class VI	many -ō verbs	many -ere verbs	most strong verbs	class I		class B I			class II; class III, IV (deponent)	no
Reduplicated athematic	class III	a few prominent -mi verbs (Note: most prominently, títhēmi "to put" < *dʰi-dʰeh₁-mi, dídōmi "to give" < *di-deh₃-mi, hístēmi "to stand" < *sti-steh₂-mi, híēmi "to send" < *yi-yeh₁-mi.)									
Reduplicated thematic (Note: Many verbs in this class were thematized in individual languages from original athematic verbs, cf. Sanskrit thematic tíṣṭhati "to stand", Latin thematic sistō "to set up" vs. Greek athematic hístēmi "to stand". The cognates of Sanskrit sī́dati "to sit" and píbati "to drink" are thematic in all languages and may be original formations.)	a few verbs (Note: e.g. tíṣṭhati "to stand" < *sti-sth₂-eti, sī́dati "to sit" < *si-zd-eti, píbati "to drink" < *pi-bh₃-eti < *pi-ph₃-eti.)	a few verbs (Note: e.g. gígnomai "to be born", mímnō "to stay", hízdō "to sit" < *si-sd-.)	a few verbs (Note: e.g. gignō "to beget", sistō "to set up", sīdō "to sit down" < *si-sd-, bibō "to drink" < *bi-bh₃- < *pi-bh₃-, serō "to sow" < *si-sh₁-, reddō "to give back" < *rededō < re- + *de-dh₃- (Sihler 1995, p. 496).)				relics (Note: ibid "to drink" < *pibh₃-.)				
nasal infix	class VII	CV-n-C-ánō verbs	CV-n-Cō verbs	relics	relics	n-infix verbs	class B III	-an- verbs		class VII	causative -nin- verbs?
nasal infix + laryngeal	class IX	-nēmi verbs	a few -n verbs	4th weak (fientive)	class II (semelfactive -nǫ- verbs)		class B IV			class VI	no?
nu-suffix	class V, VIII	-nūmi verbs	relics	relics	class II (semelfactive -nǫ- verbs)		class B V				causative -nu- verbs
ye-suffix	5a: class IV; 5b: passive verbs	many *-Cyō verbs	3rd conj. i-stem; part of 4th conj.	strong verbs with -j- present	a few -ī/ī verbs	many verbs?	class B II	5b: passive -i- verbs		class IV subjunctive	
sḱe-suffix	9a: 13 -cchati verbs	9a: relics; 9b: several verbs	9a: several verbs; 9b: only discō "learn"								
combined eh₁-sḱe-suffix			stative inchoative in -ēscere (productive)					-čʻ- morpheme	a few -oh verbs		perhaps connected to the -ēšš- suffix
other sḱe		Homeric habitual past -esk- verbs	inchoative in -(ī)scere (productive)					c`-aorist, -ic`-subjunctive		class IX in B; causative in -ṣṣ- (very productive)	habitual, durative in -šk- (very productive)
se-suffix	relics	relics	relics	relics	relics	relics	relics	relics	relics	class VIII esp. in A	
Secondary imperfective
PIE	Sanskrit	Greek	Latin	Germ	OCS	Lith	OIr	Arm	Alb	Toch	Hitt
eh₁(ye)-stative		-(th)ē- aorist passive	most 2nd conj. verbs	most 3rd weak verbs	-ěj/ě- verbs; impf. -ě- > -a- suffix						
éye-causative	caus. verbs (very productive)	CoC-eō verbs: some iter., a few caus.	-ēre caus. verbs	caus. 1st weak (common)	caus./iter. -ī/ī verbs		caus. weak i- verbs (class A II)				
(h₁)se-desiderative	esp. 10b: desid. verbs (productive)	10a: future tense	relics	no?			10b: future tense				
(h₁)sye-desiderative	future tense		no?	no?	relic: byšęštĭ	future tense	Gaulish future tense				
ye-denominative	-yáti verbs	many *-Cyō verbs (e.g., -ainō, -izdō, -eiō); -iō, -uō								class XII from n-nouns	
(e)-ye-denominative	class X; denom. -a-yáti verbs	many -eō contract verbs	many -īre, a few -ēre verbs	denom. 1st weak	denom. -ī/ī verbs		denom. weak i-verbs (class A II)				
(e)h₂(ye)-factitive/denominative	-āyati verbs	-aō contract verbs	-āre verbs (1st conj.)	2nd weak in -ō-	-aj/a- verbs (class III Aa)		weak a-verbs (class A I)				6b: athem. factitive
(o)-ye-factitive?		-oō contract verbs?		factitive 3rd weak verbs?							"a class of Anatolian denominatives"?
Perfective
PIE	Sanskrit	Greek	Latin	Germ	OCS	Lith	OIr	Arm	Alb	Toch	Hitt
Root athematic	class I (predominant in early Vedic; c. 130 attested verbs)	root aorist: well-attested			no	no?			< 20	class I preterite	a few presents
Root thematic	class II (more common in later Vedic)	second aorist		"aorist-present" verbs (relics) > thematic presents	"root aorist" to class I, II				highly productive	class VI preterite	
Reduplicated	class III (to causatives)	aorist to causatives							only dua 'to love'	class II preterite in Toch. A (usually causative)	
s-suffix	classes IV, V, VI, VII	first aorist	s-perfect (to many primary -ere verbs)	no	sigmatic, productive aorist	no	s- and t-preterite; in subj., s-subjunctive		sigmatic sh-aorist	class III preterite	
Stative
PIE	Sanskrit	Greek	Latin	Germ	OCS	Lith	OIr	Arm	Alb	Toch	Hitt
Root (only *wóyde)	vétti "to know"	oîda "to know"	vīdī "have seen"	*witaną "to know"	věděti "to know"	no?		gitem "to know"			
Reduplicated	perfect tense (in Vedic, with present meaning)	perfect tense (often with present meaning, esp. in Homer)	reduplicated perfect (many verbs); a few perfect-presents	preterite tense; preterite-presents (15 verbs)		no?	redup. preterite	no		some class III preterites; perfect ptc.	ḫi-presents
Participles
PIE	Sanskrit	Greek	Latin	Germ	OCS	Lith	OIr	Arm	Alb	Toch	Hitt
-nt- participle: usually active present ptc.	yes	yes	yes	yes	yes	yes	only relics	no		yes	meaning like a t-participle
-mh₁n- participle: usually middle present ptc.	yes	yes	only relics	no?	present passive ptc. in *-mo-	yes in OPrus; present passive ptc. in *-mo-	only relics			present passive ptc. in *-m-?	
-wos- participle: usually active past ptc.	yes	yes	-v- perfects?	no	yes	yes		no		yes	
-t- past participle (passive for trans. verbs, active for intrans.)	to most verbs	yes, adjectival force?	yes	to weak verbs, some adjectives	yes	yes	passive preterite	no			no
-n- past participle (same meaning as t-participle)	to some verbs		only relics	to strong verbs	yes	only relics	only relics	no?			no
-l- past participle	(Note: Not in recorded Sanskrit, but has survived to modern use, found in outer Indo Aryan languages.)	no	no	no	active "resultative"	no	no	passive	no	Toch. A gerundive	no
Other formations
PIE	Sanskrit	Greek	Latin	Germ	OCS	Lith	OIr	Arm	Alb	Toch	Hitt
subjunctive	subjunctive (future meaning)	subjunctive	future of 3rd, 4th conj.		no	no?	a-subj.?; s-subjunctive < aorist subj.			yes	
optative	optative	optative	im-subj. to athematic verbs	subjunctive; also wiljaną "want"	imperative	imperative ("permissive"?)	no		optative; plural imperfect	optative; imperfect	no
imperative	yes	yes	yes	yes	yes	no	no	yes	yes	yes	yes
lengthened perfect/aorist in -ē-	?	?	long-vowel perfect	?	?	?	?	?	?	class II preterite in Toch. B	?
imperfect	imperfect tense (in Vedic, with aorist meaning)	imperfect tense	no?	only dōną "do"	no?	no?	no?	aorist, imperfect	singular imperfect	no?	preterite tense?
middle voice	in -i-	in -i-	in -r-, passive meaning	in -i-, passive meaning	no?	no?	in -r-	in -i-	in -i-	primary endings in -r-, secondary in -i-	in -r-
deponent (middle-only) verbs	yes	yes	yes	no (*haitaną "to call" in post-Northwest Germanic)						yes	
dual verbs	yes	2nd/3rd person only	no	1st/2nd person only	yes	yes	no (nouns only)			yes	

=== Germanic ===
In Germanic, all eventive verbs acquired primary indicative endings, regardless of the original aspectual distinction. These became the "present tense" of Germanic. Almost all presents were converted to the thematic inflection, using the singular (e-grade) stem as the basis. A few tudati-type athematic verbs survived (*wiganą "to battle", *knudaną "to knead"), but these were usually regularised by the daughter languages. Of the athematic verbs, only three verbs are reconstructable:

- *wesaną "to be" (present *immi, *isti, from imperfective *h₁ésmi, *h₁ésti),
- *beuną "to be, to become" (present *biumi, *biuþi, from perfective **bʰewHm, **bʰewHt)
- *dōną "to do, to put" (present *dōmi, *dōþi, from perfective *dʰéh₁m̥, *dʰéh₁t).

The merger of perfective and imperfective verbs brought root verbs in competition with characterized verbs, and the latter were generally lost. Consequently, Germanic has no trace of the s-suffix perfectives, and very few characterized primary imperfectives; by far the most primary verbs were simple root verbs. Some imperfectives with the ye-suffix survived into Proto-Germanic, as did one nasal-infix verb (*standaną "to stand" ~ *stōþ), but these were irregular relics. Other characterized presents were preserved only as relic formations and generally got converted to other verbal formations. For example, the present *pr̥skéti "to ask, to question" was preserved as Germanic *furskōną, which was no longer a simple thematic verb, but had been extended with the class 2 weak suffix -ō-.

Stative verbs became the "past tense" or "preterite tense" in Germanic, and new statives were generally formed to accompany the primary eventives, forming a single paradigm. A dozen or so primary statives survived, in the form of the "preterite-present verbs". These retained their stative (in Germanic, past or preterite) inflection, but did not have a past-tense meaning. The past tense ("imperfect") of the eventive verbs was entirely lost, having become redundant in function to the old statives. Only one single eventive past survives, namely of *dōną: *dedǭ, *dedē, from the past reduplicated imperfective *dʰédʰeh₁m̥, *dʰédʰeh₁t.

Secondary eventives (causatives, denominatives etc.) did not have any corresponding stative in PIE and did not acquire one in Germanic. Instead, an entirely novel formation, the so-called "dental past", was formed to them (e.g., *satjaną "to set" ~ *satidē). Thus, a clear distinction arose between "strong verbs" or primary verbs, which had a past tense originating from the statives, and "weak verbs" or secondary verbs, whose past tense used the new dental suffix. The original primary statives (preterite-presents) also used the dental suffix, and a few primary ye-suffix presents also came to use the weak past rather than the strong past, such as *wurkijaną "to work" ~ *wurhtē and *þunkijaną "to think, to consider" ~ *þunhtē. However, these verbs, having no secondary derivational suffix, attached the dental suffix directly to the root with no intervening vowel, causing irregular changes through the Germanic spirant law. Ending-wise, the strong and weak pasts converged on each other; the weak past used descendants of the secondary eventive endings, while the strong past preserved the stative endings only in the singular, and used secondary eventive endings in the dual and plural.

=== Balto-Slavic ===
The stative aspect was reduced to relics already in the Balto-Slavic, with very little of it reconstructable. The aorist and indicative past tense merged, creating the Slavic aorist. Baltic lost the aorist, while it survived in Proto-Slavic.

Modern Slavic languages have since mostly lost the aorist, but it survives in Bulgarian, Macedonian, Serbo-Croatian and Sorbian. Slavic innovated a new imperfect tense, which appeared in Old Church Slavonic and still exists in the same languages as the aorist. A new past tense was also created in the modern languages to replace or complement the aorist and imperfect, using a periphrastic combination of the copula and the so-called "l-participle", originally a deverbal adjective. In many languages today, the copula was dropped in this formation, turning the participle itself into the past tense.

The Slavic languages innovated an entirely new aspectual distinction between imperfective and perfective verbs, based on derivational formations.

== See also ==
- Sanskrit verbs
- Ancient Greek verbs
- Indo-European copula
- Lexikon der indogermanischen Verben (Lexicon of the Indo-European Verbs)

== Sources ==
- Beekes, Robert S. P. (2011), de Vaan, Michiel (ed.), Comparative Indo-European Linguistics (Second ed.), Amsterdam: John Benjamins, ISBN 90-272-2150-2
- Beekes, Robert S. P. (2010), Etymological Dictionary of Greek, Leiden Indo-European Etymological Dictionary Series, vol. 10, with the assistance of Lucien van Beek, Leiden, Boston: Brill, ISBN 9789004174207
- Buck, Carl Darling (1933), Comparative Grammar of Greek and Latin (PDF), University of Chicago Press, ISBN 0-226-07931-7
- Burrow, T (2001). The Sanskrit Language (2001 ed.). Motilal Banarsidass. ISBN 81-208-1767-2.
- Clackson, James (2007). Indo-European Linguistics. Cambridge. doi:10.1017/CBO9780511808616. ISBN 978-0-521-65313-8.
- Cohen, Paul S.; Wald, Benji (31 December 2022). "On the PIE root-structure constraint prohibiting repeated consonants". Papers in Historical Phonology. 7. doi:10.2218/pihph.7.2022.8959. ISSN 2399-6714.
- Comrie, Bernard (1998), "The Indo-European Linguistic Family: Genetic and Typological Perspectives", in Ramat, Anna Giacalone; Ramat, Paolo (eds.), The Indo-European Languages, Routledge, doi:10.4324/9780203880647, ISBN 9781134921874
- Cser, András (2009). "The history of perfective reduplication and stem-initial patterns in Latin". Acta Antiqua Academiae Scientiarum Hungaricae. 49 (2): 107–115. doi:10.1556/AAnt.49.2009.2.1. ISSN 0044-5975.
- de Vaan, Michiel (2011). "PIE i-presents, s-presents, and their reflexes in Latin". Glotta. 87: 23–36. ISSN 0017-1298.
- Drinka, Bridget, ed. (2017), "Sources of the Perfect in Indo- European", Language Contact in Europe: The Periphrastic Perfect through History, Cambridge Approaches to Language Contact, Cambridge: Cambridge University Press, pp. 73–93, doi:10.1017/9781139027694.005, ISBN 978-1-139-02769-4
- Fortson, Benjamin W. IV (2010), Indo-European Language and Culture (Second ed.), Wiley-Blackwell, ISBN 978-1-4051-8896-8
- Jasanoff, Jay H. (2003), Hittite and the Indo-European Verb, Oxford University Press, ISBN 0-19-924905-9
- Jasanoff, Jay H. (2 December 2019). "The sigmatic forms of the Hittite verb". Indo-European Linguistics. 7 (1): 13–71. doi:10.1163/22125892-00701001. ISSN 2212-5884.
- Kapović, Mate (2017), "Proto-Indo-European morphology", in Kapović, Mate (ed.), The Indo-European Languages, Routledge Language Family Series (2nd ed.), Abingdon, Oxon: Routledge, ISBN 9781317391531
- Kloekhorst, Alwin (2008). Lubotsky, Alexander (ed.). Etymological Dictionary Of The Hittite Inherited Lexicon (PDF). Leiden Indo-European Etymological Dictionary Series. Vol. 5. Brill. ISBN 978-90-04-16092-7. ISSN 1574-3586.
- Kocharov, Petr (2016). "Proto-Indo-European lexical aspect and stem patterns". Faits de Langues. 47 (1): 75–88. doi:10.1163/19589514-047-01-900000005. ISSN 1244-5460.
- Kölligan, Daniel (5 December 2018). "A new look at the Greek desiderative". Indo-European Linguistics. 6 (1): 95–116. doi:10.1163/22125892-00601006. ISSN 2212-5884.
- Kölligan, Daniel (21 June 2019). "Greek and the Indo-European Verb". Mnemosyne. 72 (4): 673–702. doi:10.1163/1568525x-12342700. ISSN 0026-7074.
- Kümmel, Martin Joachim (23 September 2020), "The development of the perfect within IE verbal systems: An overview", in Crellin, Robert; Jügel, Thomas (eds.), Perfects in Indo-European Languages and Beyond, Current Issues in Linguistic Theory, vol. 352, Amsterdam: John Benjamins Publishing Company, pp. 15–48, doi:10.1075/cilt.352.02kum, ISBN 978-90-272-0737-1
- Lazzeroni, Romano (1998), "Sanskrit", in Ramat, Anna Giacalone; Ramat, Paolo (eds.), The Indo-European Languages, Routledge, doi:10.4324/9780203880647, ISBN 9781134921874
- Lundquist, Jesse; Yates, Anthony D. (11 June 2018), "122. The morphology of Proto-Indo-European" (PDF), in Klein, Jared; Joseph, Brian; Fritz, Matthias (eds.), Volume 3 Handbook of Comparative and Historical Indo-European Linguistics, De Gruyter Mouton, pp. 2079–2195, doi:10.1515/9783110542431-043, ISBN 978-3-11-054243-1
- Melchert, H. Craig (2017), "Anatolian", in Kapović, Mate (ed.), The Indo-European Languages, Routledge Language Family Series (2nd ed.), Abingdon, Oxon: Routledge, ISBN 9781317391531
- Rasmussen, Jens Elmegård (1997). "Processes of grammaticalization in ludo-European verbal derivation". In Lubotsky, Alexander (ed.). Sound Law and Analogy: Papers in honor of Robert S.P. Beekes on the occasion of his 60th birthday. Leiden Studies in Indo-European. Vol. 9. Brill. pp. 249–262. doi:10.1163/9789004658844_028. ISBN 978-90-04-65884-4.
- Ringe, Don (2006). From Proto-Indo-European to Proto-Germanic. A Linguistic History of English. Vol. 1 (1st ed.). New York City: Oxford University Press. ISBN 978-0-19-928413-9. OCLC 64554645. OL 7405151M. Wikidata Q131605459.
- Rix, Helmut (2001) [1998], Lexikon der Indogermanischen Verben [Lexicon of Indo-European Verbs] (in German), L. Reichert, ISBN 3-89500-219-4, OCLC 47295102
- Sihler, Andrew L. (1995), New Comparative Grammar of Greek and Latin, Oxford University Press, ISBN 0-19-508345-8
- Watkins, Calvert (1969), Indo-European Origins of the Celtic Verb, Dublin Institute for Advanced Studies, ISBN 0-901282-24-3
- Watkins, Calvert (1998). "Proto-Indo-European: Comparison and Reconstruction". In Ramat, Anna Giacalone; Ramat, Paolo (eds.). The Indo-European languages. Routledge. ISBN 978-0-415-06449-1.
- Weiss, Michael L. (2009). Outline of the historical and comparative grammar of Latin. Ann Arbor: Beech Stave Press. ISBN 978-0-9747927-5-0.
- Yakubovich, Ilya (2014). "Reflexes Of Indo-European ' Ē -Statives' In Old Indic". Transactions of the Philological Society. 112 (3): 386–408. doi:10.1111/1467-968X.12039. ISSN 0079-1636.
