= Proto-Indo-European aorist =

Grammatical aspect

In Proto-Indo-European language, there are several distinct types of reconstructable aorist verb formations. Of these, the athematic root aorist—which demonstrated the full-grade in the singular and the zero-grade in the plural—was seemingly the most common.

There was a thematic root aorist formation, which displayed fixed zero-grade in the root and the accent on the suffix with the thematic inflectional endings. This type may have been extremely rare in the original proto-language and it is possible that many later examples of thematic root aorists are post-PIE innovations.

Another type of thematic aorist, the reduplicated thematic aorist, was also uncommon and is largely confined to the Greek, Indo-Iranian, and potentially Armenian branches. The sigmatic aorist, which displayed Narten-type ablaut, is widely attested throughout the Indo-European family, though there are few examples of this formation that can be confidently reconstructed in the original Proto-Indo-European language itself.

== Root athematic ==
According to Ringe, this type was the most common aoristic formation in Proto-Indo-European. It was formed similarly to root athematic verbs, though it had secondary endings. The linguist Melanie Malzahn notes that there is evidence that the root aorist paradigm originally showcased the full-grade in the singular and the dual, while demonstrating the zero-grade in the plural. For instance, in Ancient Greek, aoristic forms such as ἔβητον ("ébēton") and ἔβημεν ("ébēmen") perhaps reflects the pre-forms *gʷéh₂tom and *gʷéh₂me respectively. Such an ablaut sequence would be highly unusual for Proto-Indo-European verbs, as all other known formations either display fixed ablaut or the full-grade in the singular and the zero-grade in both the dual and the plural. It is unclear whether this irregularity dates back to the Proto-Indo-European period or is instead the result of a secondary reintroduction of the full-grade due to analogical pressures. Homeric Greek also reveals a third-person dual form of the shape βάτην ("bátēn"), which may preserve original zero-grade vocalism in contrast to the later variant ἐβήτην ("ebḗtēn").

== Root thematic ==
The formation seemed to have zero-grade of the root and accent on the thematic vowel, like the "tudati" type. It is possible that the thematic root aorist originated as the past imperfect of tudati-type presents, though it also possible that the tudati-presents were secondarily created on the model of these aorists. It is possible that certain examples of thematic root aorists in Ancient Greek served as replacements for older athematic root aorists, such as the form ἔκλυον ("ékluon"), which replaced the athematic variant κλῦτε ("klûte"). According to Beekes, there is a corresponding thematic aorist formation in Sanskrit śruvam, though Beekes explains both the Indo-Aryan and Greek forms as innovations. Within Ancient Greek, thematic root aorists often cooccur with double-nasal presents, such as the aorist ἔλαθον ("élathon") which is beside the present λανθάνω ("λανθάνω"). Such a pattern is perhaps also present in Armenian, where the nasal-infix present lkʻanem—which parallels Ancient Greek λιμπάνω ("limpánō")—also showcases a thematic root aorist elikʻ, which corresponds to Ancient Greek ἔλιπον ("élipon"), itself perhaps from *likʷét. Another example perhaps derives from Old Armenian egit, which belongs to the nasal-infix present gtanem.

Few examples of this formation are reconstructable, though—according to Yates and Lundquist—examples such as *h₁ludʰét and *widét strongly indicate that this type of aorist is of PIE date. The term *h₁ludʰét is particularly suggestive of the antiquity of this type, since the verb is continued by terms such as Old Irish luid and Tocharian B lac, both of which belonged to languages where the thematic root aorist type is otherwise absent. Jasanoff suggests that the formation was almost certainly rare, as—should it have been common—then it likely would have left far more traces in the Indo-European family. The formation was completely abandoned in the Germanic branch, indicating that it was used so infrequently as to be completely dropped from the verbal system of some of the daughter languages. There are other such aorists present in the Indo-European languages, particularly the Greek, Armenian, and Indo-Iranian branches, such as Ancient Greek ἔφυγον ("éphugon") and Armenian ebarj. According to the linguist George Cardona, the majority of these terms are later innovations, though Yates and Lundquist argue that the ability to confidently reconstruct multiple instances of this formation implies that there were additional examples of this class in PIE.

== Reduplicated thematic ==
In Ancient Greek, there several verbs that demonstrate a rare type of reduplicated zero-grade aorist. The reduplicated aorist may have remained productive up until the Proto-Greek period, as forms such as λέλαθον (lélathon) derive from roots that potentially emerged later in the development of the Proto-Indo-European language, such as *leh₂-dʰ. Regardless, these terms were already rare by the time of Homer, and they had almost completely disappeared from non-poetic contexts by the Classical period. In Ancient Greek literature, it was common to replace reduplicated aorists with sigmatic forms. For instance, the reduplicated aorist πέπιθον (pépithon) was replaced by ἔπεισα (épeisa) and the reduplicated aorist form πέφραδον (péphradon) was replaced by ἔφρασα (éphrasa). Willi proposes that the few reduplicated aorists that survived into Classical antiquity—such as εὗρον (heûron)—were likely preserved partially because phonological shifts had rendered them synchronically unidentifiable as reduplicated formations. Though, according to Willi, certain reduplicated aorists—such as Homeric κεκύθωσι (kekúthōsi)—may constitute later formations created for poetic purposes. Etymologically, these forms may connect to the Indo-Iranian reduplicated aorist. For instance, terms such as Avestan nąsat̰ and Sanskrit ávocat may serve as direct cognates to Ancient Greek ἤνεγκα (ḗnenka) and εἶπον (eîpon) respectively. Additionally, Old Armenian arar-, the aorist stem of aṙnem, may directly parallel the Ancient Greek reduplicated aorist form ἄραρον (áraron), which may trace back to Proto-Indo-European *h₂e-h₂r-e/o-, itself formed from the root *h₂er-. Further comparanda may be identified in the Tocharian class II preterite, which—in Tocharian A—is reserved for causative verbs. This causative meaning may semantically align with the similar causative restriction of the Sanskrit forms and the typically factitive function of the Ancient Greek reduplicated aorist. Though, the prehistory of this class in Tocharian A is not uncontroversial and the connection with the reduplicated aorist is heavily disputed.

In Sanskrit, reduplicated aorists remained only productively capable of forming new terms from causatives, such as the aorist term ábūbudhat ("has awakened"), which derives from the causative bodháyati ("to wake up"). However, the reduplication vowel for this type of aorist was usually /i/ or /u/, whereas in Ancient Greek it is always /e/, thereby complicating an etymological relationship. According to the philologist Andreas Willi, the Indo-Iranian forms may have merely analogically remodeled themselves according to the i-reduplicated present stems, such as zīzanəṇti. Such a development may have been partially spurred by the semantics of this class, which typically possessed factitive—and therefore highly-transitive—meanings. Morphologically, present-stem reduplication in Proto-Indo-European was also associated with transitivity, perhaps aiding in the conflation of the two classes. According to the linguist Ondřej Šefčík, it is possible that the causative aorist of Sanskrit is an Indo-Aryan innovation, as this class does not appear to have existed in Indo-Iranian.

Besides the productive class of Sanskrit causative aorists, other Indo-Iranian aorists appear to have more accurately preserved the original type of Proto-Indo-European formation. The archaic reduplicated aorists in Vedic Sanskrit often display thematic endings, perhaps hinting at an originally thematic paradigm. For instance, Avestan -jaγnəṇte and Ancient Greek πέφνε (péphne) may both reflect a thematic form *gʷʰé-gʷʰn-e-t, which derives from the root *gʷʰen-. In Ancient Greek, thematic and athematic reduplicated aorists often coexist with each other: Homer, for instance, utilizes the thematic first-person singular form ἔειπον (éeipon) and the athematic second-person singular form ἔειπας (éeipas). Likewise, the thematic first-person singular form ἤνεγκον and the third-person singular imperative form ἔνεικε exist alongside the athematic second-person singular form ἤνεγκας (ḗnenkas) in Greek literature. Willi argues that the attested thematic forms generally occupy parts of the paradigm that are resistant to change, and therefore it is more likely that the thematic forms reflect the original situation in Proto-Indo-European. Moreover, according to Willi, the athematic forms generally appear in words such as ἤνεικα (ḗneika), which had been rendered synchronically unanalyzable as reduplicated formations and therefore may have been remodeled after the more standard athematic aorists.

Certain archaic Sanskrit reduplicated aorists display athematic flexion, such as susrot or ájagan, which may derive from earlier *se-srew-t or *gʷe-gʷem-t respectively, themselves from the roots *srew- and *gʷem-. The athematic character of these forms may imply the existence of an inherited class of athematic reduplicated aorists. Alternatively, Willi suggests that these terms may have been reshaped analogically according to the Vedic pluperfect, which—like the aorist—displays secondary endings and expresses anterior meanings. Such similarities may have also allowed for new aoristic formations to arise on the model of the pluperfect, such as the aorist form ápaptat, which may have been fashioned after the pluperfect form ápaptuḥ. Other Sanskrit causative reduplicated aorists show athematic endings, such as ájīgar, which may derive from earlier *(h₁e-)gi-h₁ger-t. These forms may have secondarily acquired athematic character under the influence of the reduplicated i-presents, which were themselves athematic.

Regarding the semantics of this class, Willi argues that—in Ancient Greek—reduplicated aorists exclusively possess transitive meanings. In certain cases, the transitivity was already inherent to the basic root of the verb. For instance, the reduplicated aorist form πέφαται (péphatai, "kill") may derive from a Proto-Indo-European reduplicated aorist *gʷʰe-gʷʰn-e/o-, itself from the root *gʷʰen-, which possessed the transitive meaning "to kill." However, the verb ἀραρίσκω (ararískō), which normally holds an intransitive meaning "to fit," displays a reduplicated aorist ἄραρον (áraron), which showcases a transitive-factitive meaning of "to adapt, make fit." Willi suggests that this transitive-factitive value extends to the mediopassive forms of reduplicated aorists. In particular, Willi cites the form πεπυθέσθαι (peputhésthai, "find out, learn"), which may derive from Proto-Indo-European *bʰe-bʰudʰ-e/o-, itself from the root *bʰewdʰ- ("to be awake, aware"), whence also πυνθάνομαι (punthánomai, "to learn"). According to Willi, the mediopassive of the reduplicated aorist likely meant "to make oneself aware," hence to "to learn."

However, Ancient Greek terms such as εὗρον (heûron, "found") or ἄραρον (áraron, "fit")—which are among the few reduplicated aorists have strong candidates for other Indo-European cognates—generally, according to Willi, are also among the least associated with factitivity. Thus, Willi argues that the confinement to the factitive domain was a later development not necessarily present in the earliest stages of the Proto-Indo-European language. The factitive meaning may have evolved from a more generally perfective significance, which—following the loss of the productivity of the reduplicated aorist—was then usurped by other aoristic formations. Such a development may obey the fourth law of analogy outlined by the linguist Jerzy Kuryłowicz, which decrees that an older formation—when replaced by a newer one—is typically relegated to a more minor role, whereas the newer formation assumes the original, more basic function.

The factitive meaning of the reduplicated aorist overlaps with the semantics of the sigmatic aorist, which could also express factitivity. Thus, Willi suggests that the reduplicated aorist is likely the more ancient formation, as—should it have arisen after the s-aorist—it would have fulfilled no special role not already performed by a far-productive paradigm. Kölligan argues that other languages feature multiple causative forms with similar semantic properties. In particular, Kölligan cites the German language, which contains distinct causative verbs such as setzen ("to make sit;" causative of sitzen, "to sit") and also expresses factitivity through periphrastic constructions with verbs such as machen. According to Kölligan, the scarce attestation of the reduplicated aorist type, especially outside of Greek and Indo-Iranian, indicates that this aoristic class was a later development. In contrast, Willi interprets the paucity of the material as further evidence for the antiquity of the formation. Willi suggests that examples of reduplicated aorists are rare precisely because the majority were replaced by later innovations. Within this hypothesis, the few surviving examples—such as εἶπον (eîpon)—were likely common terms that had become deeply embedded in typical speech, thereby allowing for their continuance even after their broader morphological class had become outdated. Though, Kölligan proposes that these few persistent forms may also reflect the early stages of a newly productive type, rather than the fragments of an extremely archaic class.

== Sigmatic aorist ==
This formation was perhaps inflected as the "Narten" athematic type, with lengthened grade in the singular and fixed accent. The most archaic ablaut pattern in the Indo-Iranian languages consists of the lengthened grade in the active indicative and injunctive and the e-grade in the subjunctive and the middle indicative. In Ancient Greek, there is no ablaut within the indicative endings of the sigmatic aorist; it almost always takes either the e-grade or the same ablaut grade as the present stem. There are certain relics in Greek that seemingly reflect the older specifically lengthened-grade forms, such as the Homeric form ἐγήρα ("egḗra"), which perhaps reflects *ǵḗrh₂-s-t. The sigmatic suffix is widely attested throughout most Indo-European languages: It became a particularly common means of forming aorists in the Greek, Slavic, and Indo-Iranian languages and there are fragments of the sigmatic aorist in the Italic and Celtic branches. Though widely attested, there are few word equations between sigmatic aorists in the western and eastern branches of the Indo-European family, with the exception of two forms that are frequently cited as the most solidly reconstructed examples of this class: *dḗyḱst and *wḗǵʰst. However, according to Willi, given the highly productive nature of the sigmatic aorist in the daughter, it is not fully clear whether the aforementioned examples are genuinely archaic. On the basis of potential cognates such as Greek ὤρεξα ("ṓrexa"), Latin rēxī, and Tocharian B reksa, and Old Irish atrecht, a third potential archaic sigmatic aorist *h₃rḗǵst may be reconstructed. Despite the difficulties in producing word equations, the morphological correspondences between the s-aorists of the differing branches imply that such a formation did exist in PIE.

== See also ==
- Aorist#Proto-Indo-European
- Proto-Indo-European language
- Proto-Indo-European verbs
