= H₂e-conjugation theory =

Theory of Proto-Indo-European declension

The *h₂e-conjugation theory adds a third conjugation to the two generally accepted conjugations of the Proto-Indo-European language (PIE), the thematic and athematic conjugations.

The symbol *h₂ refers to a particular example of a class of sounds known as "laryngeals" in the theory of PIE linguistics; it is believed to have been a pharyngeal fricative such as [ħ] or [ʕ]; the uvular fricative [χ] or the voiceless velar fricative [x] have also been suggested.

== History of the theory ==
Proposed by Jay Jasanoff in 1979 and presented in its most elaborate form in Jasanoff (2003), the evidence for the "new" verbal conjugation in PIE is based on the attested existence of the similar ḫi-conjugation in Hittite and other Anatolian languages. Whereas the Anatolian ḫi-conjugation has traditionally been seen as an innovation in the Anatolian branch of the Indo-European family of languages, Jasanoff presents evidence and arguments to place it as a conjugation already established in PIE proper. Hittitologist Alwin Kloekhorst has argued that the ḫi-conjugation of Hittite is virtually the same as the reconstructed perfect (or stative) of Proto-Indo-European, but without any reduplication.

== The problem ==
The following table serves to give an understanding of the problem that the theory tries to solve.

	Hittite present		PIE present		PIE "ḫi-conjugation candidates"			Jasanoff's solution
	-mi conj.	-ḫi conj.	ath. conj.	???	perfect	middle	thematic present	"3rd conj." pres.ind.act.
1st pers.	-mi	-ḫi	*-mi	???	*-h₂	*-h₂	*-oh₂	*-h₂e
2nd pers.	-ši	-ti	*-si	???	*-th₂e	*-th₂e	-esi	*-th₂e
3rd pers.	-zi	-i	*-ti	???	*-e	*-o	-eti	*-e

The origin of the Hittite mi-conjugation (in the singular of the present indicative active) is not controversial. It can easily be identified as a descendant of the corresponding forms in the ancestral PIE language.

The question is, where does the ḫi-conjugation come from (represented in the table as question marks)? A very common solution (Eichner and others) has been to derive it from the PIE perfect. The second most common candidate has been the PIE middle (Rozenkranz, Kuryłowicz). (Why the PIE perfect and middle endings resemble each other so much is a major question in itself, and of course of great interest vis-à-vis the Hittite ḫi-conjugation). Deriving the Hittite ḫi-conjugation directly from the PIE thematic presents (like Couvreur did) involves huge problems, but that there is some connection seems very probable (in line with Pedersen and Watkins).

All these three solutions, according to Jasanoff, present massive problems, not the least of which being that the way verbs are distributed between the two Hittite conjugations seems arbitrary, by and large, compared to the other PIE daughter languages. Even for this reason, it seems more probable that two categories serving one function have largely merged in the other languages (Sanskrit, Greek, Latin, etc.).

Thus, the theory does not dispute that the present of the PIE 3rd conjugation is related to the traditional middle and perfect endings, it just moves the common ancestry back to a time before that of PIE proper.

(The table is greatly simplified for the sake of presentation. The plural is omitted altogether because it presents significantly greater problems than the singular, as the "normal" forms were generalized from the Hittite mi-conjugation to the ḫi-conjugation, probably by analogy.)
