= Sheila Jasanoff =

American social scientist (born 1944)

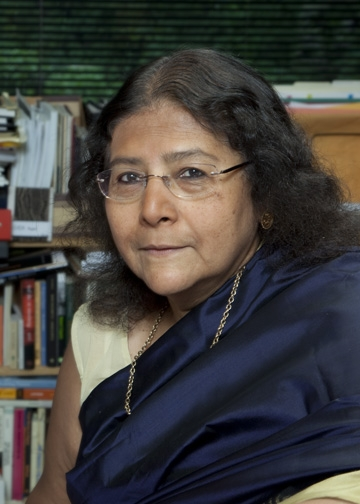
- Sheila Jasanoff in 2010
- Born: 15 February 1944 (age 82); Kolkata, India
- Education: Harvard University (BA, PhD, JD); University of Bonn (MA)
- Occupations: American social scientist, science and technology studies
- Employer(s): Cornell University, Harvard University
- Spouse: Jay Jasanoff
- Children: 2, including Maya
- Website: Official website

Sheila Sen Jasanoff (born 15 February 1944) is an Indian-American academic in the field of Science and Technology Studies. In 2021 she was elected to the American Philosophical Society. Her research has been recognized with many awards, including the 2022 Holberg Prize "for her groundbreaking research in science and technology studies."

== Early life and education ==
Jasanoff was born in Kolkata, and lived in Ballygunge with her family. She moved to Bombay in 1954 with her family, where she lived for two years before moving to the United States. Her father was Sudhir Sen, an economist working for the United Nations, while her mother Kamala was involved with the United Nations Women's Guild..

Jasanoff attended Radcliffe College of Harvard University, where she studied mathematics as an undergraduate, receiving her bachelor's degree in 1964. She then studied linguistics, receiving her M.A. at the University of Bonn (then part of West Germany). She returned to Harvard to complete a Ph.D. in linguistics in 1973, on the grammar of the Bengali language, elucidating why Bangla did not share certain features with its closest relatives in the Eastern Indo-Aryan language family, Assamese and Odia.

She completed her J.D. at Harvard Law School in 1976. She practiced environmental law in Boston from 1976 to 1978. She and her husband then accepted positions at Cornell University, where she shifted her focus to Science and Technology Studies. In 1998, Jasanoff joined the John F. Kennedy School of Government at Harvard University as a professor of public policy. In 2002, she became Pforzheimer Professor of Science and Technology Studies.

== Work ==
Jasanoff founded and directs the Program on Science, Technology, and Society at the John F. Kennedy School of Government at Harvard University. Her research focuses on science and the state in contemporary democratic societies. Her work is relevant to science & technology studies, comparative politics, law and society, political and legal anthropology, sociology and policy analysis. Jasanoff's research has considerable empirical breadth, spanning the United States, the United Kingdom, Germany, the European Union, and India, as well as emerging global regimes in areas such as climate and biotechnology.

One line of Jasanoff's work demonstrates how the political culture of different democratic societies influences how they assess evidence and expertise in policymaking. Her first book (with Brickman and Ilgen), Controlling Chemicals (1985), examines the regulation of toxic substances in the United States, Germany, and the United Kingdom. The book showed how the routines of decision making in these countries reflected different conceptions of what counts as evidence and of how expertise should operate in a policy context. In Designs on Nature: Science and Democracy in Europe and the United States (2005), she has shown how different societies employ different modes of public reasoning when making decisions involving science and technology. These differences, which in part reflect distinct "civic epistemologies," are deeply embedded in institutions and shape how policy issues are framed and processed by the bureaucratic machinery of modern states.

Jasanoff has also contributed to scholarship on the interaction of science and law. Science at the Bar (1995), for example, reached beyond the prevailing diagnoses of structural incompatibilities between science and law to explore how these socially embedded institutions interact and, to a certain extent, mutually constitute each other. The concept of regulatory science, conducted for the purposes of meeting legally mandated standards, and the "boundary" drawing activities of science advisory committees are analyzed in The Fifth Branch (1990). More recently, she has explored the "rise of the statistical victim" in toxic torts, as the law with its individualistic orientation has increasingly encountered, and sought ways to accommodate, the statistical vision of such fields as epidemiology. In her work on science and law, as well as her research on science in the state, she takes an approach that links ideas from constitutional law, political theory, and science studies to consider the "constitutional" role of science in modern democratic states.

Jasanoff has considered the politics of science not only in a comparative but also in a global context. Examples include her work on the transnational aspects of the Bhopal disaster (Learning from Disaster 1994); her research on the formation and politics of global scientific advisory bodies such as the Intergovernmental Panel on Climate Change; and her research on national and global environmental movements (e.g., Earthy Politics, 2004).

Jasanoff also has contributed to popularising and refining Science and Technology Studies as a field. Prior to moving to Harvard, she was the founding chair of the Department of Science & Technology Studies at Cornell University. She is also the founder of the Science and Democracy Network, a group of scholars interested in the study of science and the state in democratic societies that has met annually since 2002. Her research has been recognized with many awards, including the 2004 Bernal Prize from the Society for Social Studies of Science, a Guggenheim Fellowship, and the 2018 Albert O. Hirschman Prize from the Social Science Research Council.

In March 2022 she was awarded the 2022 Holberg Prize "for her groundbreaking research in science and technology studies."

== Personal life ==
Jasanoff's brother is Shankar Sen, a professor of mathematics at Cornell University. She is married to Jay H. Jasanoff, and has two children, Maya Jasanoff, who is a professor in the Department of History at Harvard, and Alan Jasanoff, who is a professor in the Department of Biological Engineering at MIT. Alan Jasanoff is married to Luba Katz, the daughter of Boris Katz.

In February 2022, Jasanoff was one of 38 Harvard faculty to sign a letter to the Harvard Crimson defending Professor John Comaroff, who had been found to have violated the university's sexual and professional conduct policies. The letter defended Comaroff as "an excellent colleague, advisor and committed university citizen" and expressed dismay over his being sanctioned by the university. After students filed a lawsuit with detailed allegations of Comaroff's actions and the university's failure to respond, Jasanoff was one of several signatories to say that she wished to retract her signature.

== Selected publications ==
- Can Science Make Sense of Life?. Cambridge, UK: Polity Press. 2019. ISBN 978-1-509-52271-2.
- The Ethics of Invention: Technology and the Human Future. New York, USA: W. W. Norton & Company. 2016. ISBN 978-0-393-07899-2.
- States of Knowledge: The Co-Production of Science and the Social Order. Oxford, UK: Taylor & Francis. 2004. ISBN 978-0-415-40329-0.
- The Fifth Branch: Science Advisers as Policymakers. Cambridge, USA: Harvard University Press. 1998. ISBN 978-0-674-30062-0.
