= Maya Jasanoff =

American historian (born 1974)

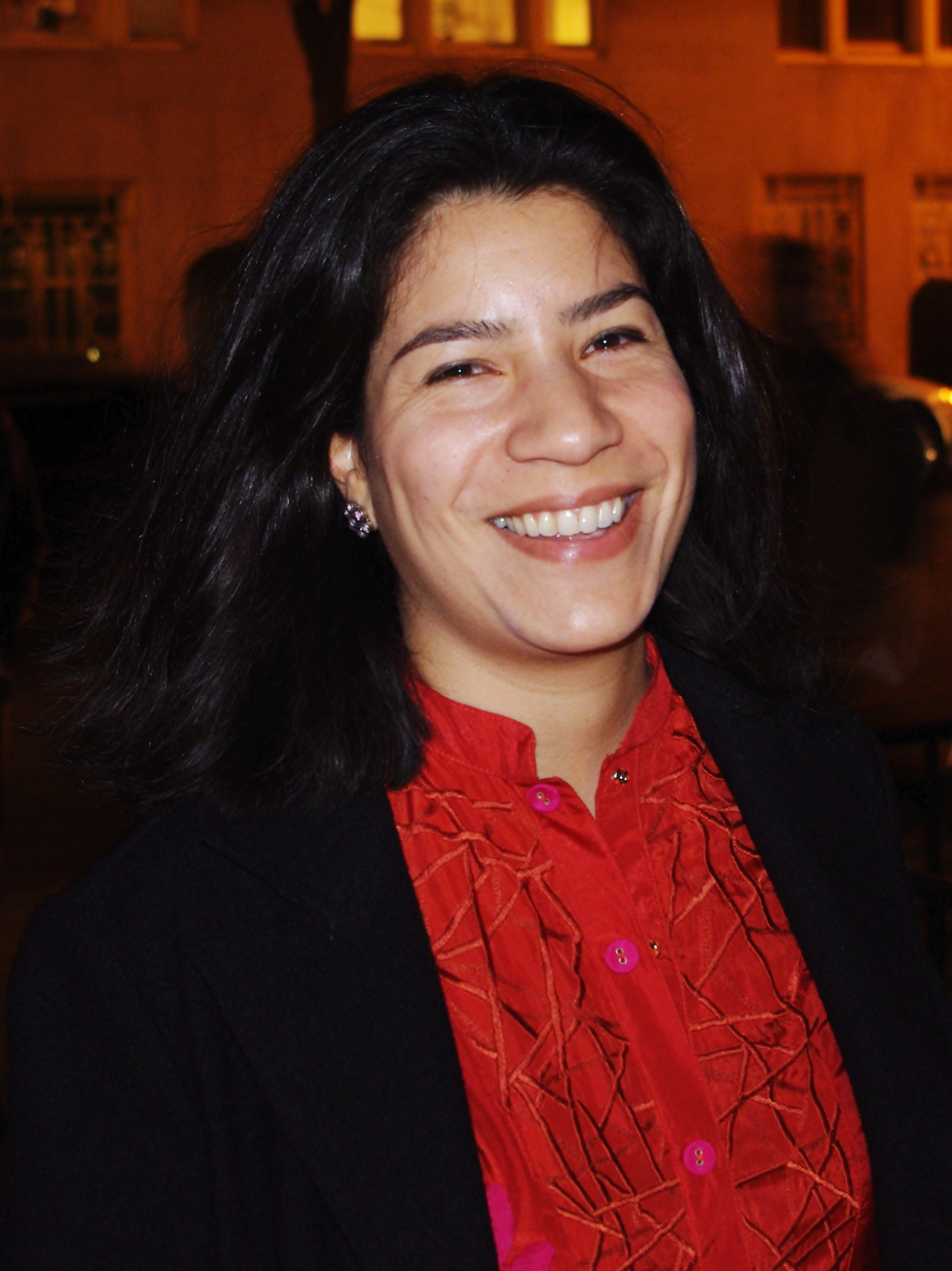
- Maya Jasanoff in 2012
- Born: October 12, 1974 (age 52); Boston, Massachusetts, U.S.
- Occupations: Historian, author
- Employer: Harvard University
- Title: Coolidge Professor of History
- Parents: Jay Jasanoff (father); Sheila Jasanoff (mother)
- Awards: Guggenheim Fellowship; Windham-Campbell Literature Prize

Academic background
- Education: Harvard University (BA); University of Cambridge (MPhil); Yale University (PhD)

Academic work
- Institutions: University of Michigan; University of Virginia; Harvard University
- Notable works: Edge of Empire (2005); Liberty's Exiles (2011)

Maya R. Jasanoff (born 1974) is an American academic and historian, and the Coolidge Professor of History at Harvard University, where she focuses on the history of Britain and the British Empire.

== Early life ==
Jasanoff grew up in Ithaca, New York, and comes from a family of academics. She is of Eastern European Jewish descent on her father's side and Indian-Bengali descent on her mother's side. Her parents, Sheila and Jay Jasanoff, are both Harvard professors, and her brother Alan is a professor at the Massachusetts Institute of Technology.

She was educated at Harvard College before studying for a master's degree at Cambridge, where she worked with Christopher Bayly. She earned her PhD at Yale University studying with Linda Colley, completing the thesis French and British imperial collecting in Egypt and India, 1780–1820 in 2002.

== Career ==
Prior to joining the faculty at Harvard, Jasanoff was a fellow at the University of Michigan Society of Fellows. She later taught at the University of Virginia.

Jasanoff chaired the 2021 Booker Prize jury; the other judges were writer and editor Horatia Harrod, actor Natascha McElhone, novelist and professor Chigozie Obioma, and writer and former archbishop Rowan Williams.

In February 2022, Jasanoff was one of 38 Harvard faculty to sign a letter to the Harvard Crimson defending professor John Comaroff, who had been found to have violated the university's sexual and professional conduct policies. After students filed a lawsuit with detailed allegations of Comaroff's actions and the university's failure to respond, Jasanoff was one of several signatories to say that she wished to retract her signature. In an e-mail, Jasanoff wrote: "I signed the letter without properly considering its impact on students and, obviously, without fuller information. This was a serious lapse in judgment and I apologize unreservedly for my mistake."

Her guest essay in The New York Times on the day of the death of Elizabeth II in which she wrote that the Queen had "helped obscure a bloody history of decolonisation" prompted a backlash on social media, including from the paper's readers. She appeared as an interviewed historian in The American Revolution (TV series), a 2025 television documentary miniseries about the American Revolution directed by Ken Burns.

=== Books ===
==== Edge of Empire ====
Jasanoff published her first book, Edge of Empire: Lives, Culture, and Conquest in the East, 1750–1850, with Alfred A. Knopf in 2005 and received mostly favorable reviews. In the London Review of Books, UCLA history and political science professor Anthony Pagden called the work a "brilliant contribution" to the historical investigation of the complexities of empire; in The Guardian, Richard Gott called it "a riveting and original book." However, in The American Historical Review, University of Pennsylvania English professor Suvir Kaul said Jasanoff's history of "objects and individuals, no matter how lovingly recollected, do not add up to an argument that historians should think of empire as instantiating 'the essential humanity of successful international relationships'," and underestimate the "concerns of those peoples who were at the receiving end of imperial power, whether that power was exerted by Europeans or by the native elites who functioned increasingly at their command." In The New York Times, Columbia University history professor Mark Mazower found "a high degree of wishful thinking" in Jasanoff's casting 18th- and early 19th-century empire as less asymmetrical domination and more "the kind of happy cross-cultural fusion that we dream about today."

==== Liberty's Exiles ====
Jasanoff published Liberty's Exiles: American Loyalists in the Revolutionary World in 2011, also with Alfred A. Knopf. The book describes the trajectories of the approximately 60,000 American Loyalists who fled the Thirteen Colonies to relocate to other parts of the British Empire; some 8,000 of those who elected to relocate were free black people, but 15,000 enslaved African-Americans were also forcibly moved when their Loyalist owners chose to go. Liberty's Exiles was widely and favorably reviewed. In The New York Times, Thomas Bender called it a "richly informative account" and "smart, deeply researched and elegantly written."

==== The Dawn Watch ====
Jasanoff's 2017 book, The Dawn Watch: Joseph Conrad in a Global World, published by Penguin Press and in the UK by William Collins centers on the life and times of novelist Joseph Conrad. The Times lauded the book as the "Conrad for our time," and The Spectator called her an "enviably gifted writer [...] her historian's eye can untie knots that might baffle the pure critic," noting that she "steers us securely and stylishly through those latitudes where Conrad witnessed the future scupper the past." In the judgment of the Financial Times: "This is an unobtrusively skilful, subtle, clear-eyed book, beautifully narrated," while the Literary Review observed: "Written with a novelist's flair for vivid detail and a scholar's attention to texts, The Dawn Watch is by any standard a major contribution to our understanding of Conrad and his time." Reviewing the book in The Guardian, Patrick French began: "The Dawn Watch will win prizes, and if it doesn't, there is something wrong with the prizes." In The Hindu, Sudipta Datta wrote that Jasanoff's approach to Conrad makes for a "remarkable retelling of Joseph Conrad's life and work and its resonance with the present dysfunctional world." In The Guardian, William Dalrymple named the book to his list of best holiday reads of 2017. According to the Wall Street Journal's reviewer, "The Dawn Watch is the most vivid and suggestive biography of Conrad ever written." In The New York Times, Ngũgĩ wa Thiong'o applauded the book as "masterful." Thiong'o wrote that Jasanoff succeeded where "An Image of Africa: Racism in Joseph Conrad's Heart of Darkness", Chinua Achebe's classic Conrad essay, had failed, specifically in bringing into clear relief "Conrad's ability to capture the hypocrisy of the 'civilizing mission' and the material interests that drove capitalist empires, crushing the human spirit." "The Dawn Watch", Thiong'o wrote, "will become a creative companion to all students of his work. It has made me want to re-establish connections with the Conrad whose written sentences once inspired in me the same joy as a musical phrase." The Dawn Watch was BBC Radio 4's Book of the Week.

As part of the project, Jasanoff blogged a journey on a cargo ship sailing from China to Europe. She also published an essay in The New York Times describing the portion of her journey in the Democratic Republic of Congo; the piece drew criticism. In a letter to the editor, Boston University professor Timothy Longman said the essay "reeks of condescension" and "continues the widespread practice of ignoring the voices of Congolese intellectuals, many of whom write about their homeland with nuance."

== Honors and awards ==
In 2005, Jasanoff won the Duff Cooper Prize for Edge of Empire. She won both the 2011 National Book Critics Circle Award for Nonfiction and 2012 George Washington Book Prize for Liberty's Exiles.

Jasanoff won a Guggenheim Fellowship in 2013, and in 2017, she was awarded the Windham–Campbell Literature Prize for Non-Fiction. Jasanoff won the 2018 Cundill History Prize for The Dawn Watch: Joseph Conrad in a Global World.

== Publications ==
=== Books ===
- Edge of Empire: Lives, Culture, and Conquest in the East, 1750–1850. New York: Alfred A. Knopf. 2005. ISBN 978-1-4000-4167-1.
- Liberty's Exiles: American Loyalists in the Revolutionary World. New York: Alfred A. Knopf. 2011. ISBN 978-1-4000-4168-8.
- The Dawn Watch: Joseph Conrad in a Global World. New York: Penguin Books. 2017. ISBN 978-1-59420-581-1.

=== Selected articles ===
- "A passage from India: Ruth Prawer Jhabvala and the art of ambivalence". The Critics. A Critic at Large. The New Yorker. Vol. 94, no. 43. January 7, 2019. pp. 62–67.
