= Jay Jasanoff =

American linguist (born 1942)

- Born: Jay Harold Jasanoff; June 12, 1942 (age 84)
- Title: Diebold Professor of Indo-European Linguistics and Philology
- Spouse: Sheila Jasanoff
- Children: 2, including Maya
- Awards: Fellow, American Academy of Arts and Sciences (2011); Fellow, Linguistic Society of America (2008); William Channing Cabot Fellowship, Harvard University (2004-2005); Hermann and Klara Collitz Professor, Linguistic Institute, University of California, Santa Cruz (1991)

Academic background
- Education: Harvard University (BA, PhD)
- Doctoral advisor: Calvert Watkins

Academic work
- Discipline: Linguistics
- Sub-discipline: Indo-European, Historical linguistics
- Institutions: Harvard University (1998-present); Cornell University (1978-1998); Harvard University (1970-1978); University of California, Berkeley (1969-1970)
- Notable students: Mary Beckman; Claire Bowern; Craig Melchert; Alan Nussbaum
- Notable works: Hittite and Indo-European Verb; The Prehistory of the Balto-Slavic Accent
- Notable ideas: H₂e-conjugation theory
- Website: http://www.people.fas.harvard.edu/~jasanoff/

Jay Harold Jasanoff (/ˈdʒæzənɒf/ or /ˈdʒæsənɒf/) is an American linguist and Indo-Europeanist, best known for his h_{2}e-conjugation theory of the Proto-Indo-European verbal system. He teaches Indo-European linguistics and historical linguistics at Harvard University.

== Career ==
Jasanoff received both his bachelor's degree (in 1963) and his Ph.D. (in 1968) from Harvard. After working for one year as an assistant professor at the University of California, Berkeley, he returned to Harvard to teach as an assistant professor and, later, associate professor from 1970 to 1978. He then moved to Ithaca, New York, to teach at Cornell University, where he was promoted to full professor in linguistics. He taught at Cornell for twenty years, including a number of years as the department chair. Since 1998 he has been the Diebold Professor of Indo-European Linguistics and Philology at Harvard, and was the department chair from 1999 to 2008.

In his research, he has examined, in addition to the Indo-European verb, such issues as the origin of the Balto-Slavic pitch accent and the internal reconstruction of the earliest stages of the Proto-Indo-European language.

== Research ==
Jasanoff’s research since the 1970s has focused on Indo-European verbal morphology, especially the reconstruction of the Proto-Indo-European middle endings (“proto-middle”). In addition to the Indo-European verb, he has treated such issues as the origin of the Balto-Slavic pitch accent, Germanic and Celtic nominal morphology, and the internal reconstruction of the earliest stages of the Proto-Indo-European language. He has emphasized the importance of the Hittite and Tocharian evidence for Proto-Indo-European reconstruction, as these languages were not available to 19th century Indo-Europeanist reconstruction. His research has contributed to integrating Hittite and Tocharian verbal morphology into the reconstruction of the Indo-European verbal system, though he emphasizes that “the post-h_{2}e-conjugation model of the PIE verb is (…) in many respects extremely conservative” and “The novelty of the ‘new’ system is entirely at the formal level.” His novel reconstruction of the Proto-Indo-European middle in the context of the *h_{2}e-conjugation theory as proposed in Hittite and the Indo-European verb and subsequent articles has been adopted by several textbooks and has been generally well-received.

=== The h_{2}e-conjugation theory ===
Jasanoff has argued that certain ablaut properties and inflectional endings found in the Hittite and Tocharian verbal systems require the revision of the traditionally reconstructed middle endings and their relationship with the endings of the PIE perfect and the thematic conjugation. Specifically, he proposes that the PIE inflectional endings for the primary (nonpast) active and middle should be reconstructed as follows:

Primary athematic active & middle sg. and pl. endings, “new model” (Jasanoff 2003)
	Active		Middle	
	Sg.	Pl.	Sg.	Pl.
1	*-m-i	*-me-	*-h_{2}e-r	*-med^{h}h_{2} (?)
2	*-s-i	*-te(-)	*-th_{2}e-r	*-d^{h}uwe- (?)
3	*-t-i	*-(é)nt-i	*-o-r, (*-to-r )	*-ro(-r), (*-nto-r)

While the reconstruction of the active endings continues the “Brugmannian” model, the middle endings differ from older reconstructions in 1) the reconstruction of the primary middle hic-et-nunc marker as *-r (rather than *-i), 2) the reconstruction of originally “dentalless” third singular and plural forms *-o(-r) and *-ro(r), which were remodeled as *-to(r) and *-nto(r) already at the PIE stage in analogy with the third person active forms, but were preserved as designated passive or “stative” endings in Indo-Iranian (Ved. 3sg. "stative" -e < *-o-i), Anatolian (Hitt. 3sg. -a(ri) < *-o(ri)) and Old Irish (3sg. pass. -ar < *-or), among others.

Concerning ablaut, Hittite and the Indo-European verb proposes a novel type of present with o/e-ablaut (later o/ø-ablaut of the root, the so-called “mólh_{2}-e-type” (*melh_{2} ‘to grind’), named after the *h_{2}e-conjugation 3sg. present *mólh_{2}-e reflected in the Hittite 3sg. present malli ‘grinds’, Lith. malù 'grind' and Gothic malan ‘to grind’ according to Jasanoff. This type has been added to the Addenda of the LIV. Jasanoff has also argued for proto-middle *h_{2}e-conjugation aorists with o/e-ablaut (later o/ø-ablaut) of the root, which gave rise to the Indo-Iranian passive aorist and the Tocharian subjunctive V, among others.

=== The sigmatic aorist ===
The Proto-Indo-European sigmatic aorist is traditionally reconstructed with Narten-ablaut of the root (ē/e), an invariant stem-forming suffix *-s-, and the athematic secondary endings. However, the corresponding active preterit categories in Hittite and Tocharian show an *-s- only in the third person singular, as well as evidence of an unexpected o-grade of the root throughout the paradigm. Jasanoff argues that this situation reflects an archaism and that the classical s-aorist emerged from an older *h_{2}e-conjugation aorist with o-grade of the root, whose 3sg. active form was replaced by an intrusive Narten-imperfect form to disambiguate it from the newly emerging *h_{2}e-conjugation middle aorists of the same shape. The proposed original paradigm thus looked as follows:

Pre-sigmatic aorist paradigm
Sg.		Pl.	
1	*próḱ-h_{2}e	1	*próḱ-me-
2	*próḱ-th_{2}e	2	*próḱ-(t)e-
3	*prḗḱ-s-t	3	*préḱ-r̥s

After Anatolian and Tocharian split off, the third singular active form became the starting point for the development of the “classical” s-aorist found in Indo-Iranian, Greek, Latin, etc. This reconstruction is elaborated and defended in Jasanoff (2019).

== Personal life ==
Jasanoff was born in New York City to Milton and Edith Jasanoff, both of Eastern European Jewish descent. He has a younger sister, Joan Reyna. His wife, Sheila Jasanoff, is a professor at the Harvard Kennedy School. His son, Alan Jasanoff, is a neuroscientist at MIT, and his daughter, Maya Jasanoff, is a professor in the Department of History at Harvard.

== Publications ==
=== Books ===
- Stative and Middle in Indo-European. Innsbrucker Beiträge zur Sprachwissenschaft 23. Innsbruck: Institut für Sprachwissenschaft, 1978. ISBN 3-85124-540-7.
- Mír Curad. Studies Presented to Calvert Watkins, edited by Jay Jasanoff, H. Craig Melchert, and Lisi Oliver. Innsbrucker Beiträge zur Sprachwissenschaft 92. Innsbruck: Institut für Sprachwissenschaft, 1998. ISBN 3-85124-667-5.
- Harvard Working Papers in Linguistics, vol. 8, edited by Cedric Boeckx, Claire Bowern and Jay Jasanoff. Cambridge, MA, 2003.
- Hittite and the Indo-European Verb. Oxford–New York: Oxford University Press, 2003. ISBN 0-19-928198-X.
- The Prehistory of the Balto-Slavic Accent. Leiden–Boston: Brill, 2017.

=== Selected articles ===
- "The sigmatic forms of the Hittite verb". Indo-European Linguistics 7 (2019), 13-71.
- "What happened to the perfect in Hittite? A contribution to the theory of the h_{2}e-conjugation". In Elisabeth Rieken (ed.), Morphosyntaktische Kategorien in Sprachgeschichte und Forschung: Akten der Arbeitstagung der Indogermanischen Gesellschaft vom 21. bis 23. September 2015 in Marburg (Wiesbaden: Reichert, 2018), 137–156.
- "The phonology of Tocharian B okso ‘ox’". In Lucien Beek, Alwin Kloekhorst, Guus Kroonen, Michaël Peyrot & Tijmen Pronk (eds.), Farnah. Indo-Iranian and Indo-European Studies in Honor of Sasha Lubotsky (Ann Arbor: Beech Stave, 2018), 72–76.
- "The Tocharian subjunctive and preterite in *-a-". In Adam I. Cooper, Jeremy Rau & Michael Weiss (eds.), Multi Nominis Grammaticus: Studies in Classical and Indo-European Linguistics in Honor of Alan J. Nussbaum on the Occasion of his Sixty-fifth Birthday (Ann Arbor: Beech Stave, 2013), 105-120.
- "The accentual type *vèdō, *vedetí and the origin of mobility in the Balto-Slavic verb", Baltistica 43/3 (2008), 339-379.
- "The ending of the PIE 2 sg. middle imperative", Die Sprache 46 (2006 [2008]), 203-212.
- "From reduplication to ablaut: the class VII strong verbs of Northwest Germanic", Historische Sprachforschung 120 (2007), 241-284.
- "Balto-Slavic accentuation: telling news from noise", Baltistica 39/2 (2004), 171-177.
- "'Stative' *-ē- revisited", Die Sprache 43 (2002-03 [2004]), 127-170.
- "Some relative forms of the verb in Old Irish". In Heiner Eichner & Hans Christian Luschützky (eds.), Compositiones Indogermanicae: In Memoriam Jochem Schindler (Prague: Enigma, 1999), 205-222.
- "The thematic conjugation revisited". In Jay Jasanoff, H. Craig Melchert & Lisi Oliver (eds.), Mír Curad. Studies in Honor of Calvert Watkins (Innsbruck: Institut für Sprachwissenschaft der Universität Innsbruck, 1998), 301-316.
- "Aspects of the internal history of the PIE verbal system". In George E. Dunkel, Gisela Meyer, Salvatore Scarlata & Christian Seidl (eds.), Früh-, Mittel-, und Spätindogermanisch. Akten der IX. Fachtagung der Indogermanischen Gesellschaft vom 5. bis 9. Oktober 1992 in Zürich (Wiesbaden: Reichert,1994), 149-168.
- "The ablaut of the root aorist optative in Proto-Indo-European", Münchener Studien zur Sprachwissenschaft 52 (1991), 101-122.
- "Old Irish bé 'woman'", Ériu 40 (1989), 135-141.
- "Language and gender in the Tarim Basin: the Tocharian 1 sg. pronoun", Tocharian and Indo-European Studies 3 (1989), 125-148.
- "The r-endings of the IE middle," Die Sprache 24 (1977), 159-170.
- "The Germanic third weak class", Language 49 (1973), 850-870.
