= Marrucinian language =

Ancient Italian language

Marrucinian
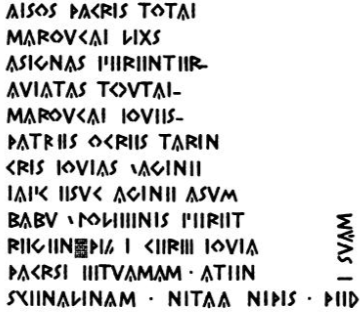
- The text of the Rapino Bronze, an inscription in the Marrucinian language
- Region: Italy
- Ethnicity: Marrucini
- Era: 2nd century BC
- Language family: Indo-European: Italic; Osco-Umbrian; Oscan; Marrucinian
- Writing system: Old Italic alphabet

Language codes
- ISO 639-3: umc
- Glottolog: marr1267

Marrucinian is an extinct Osco-Umbrian language formerly spoken by the Marrucini.

A few inscriptions in the Marrucinian language survive. They indicate that the language was a member of the Sabellian group, probably closely related to Paelignian. Most of the inscriptions are very short, but there is one longer inscription, a bronze tablet inscribed with a text of 35 words. This was found at Rapino, and known as the "Aes Rapinum" ("Bronze of Rapino"). It is dated to about the middle of the 3rd century BC. It was formerly in the Museum of Antiquities in Berlin, but appears to have been lost during the Second World War. The opening of the Aes Rapinum reads Aisos pacris toutai maroucai lixs asignas ferenter auiatas toutai maroucai ioues patres ocres tarin cris iouais. agine.

The name of the city or tribe that it gives is touta marouca, and it mentions also a citadel with the epithet tarin cris. Several of its linguistic features, both in vocabulary and in syntax, are of considerable interest to the student of Latin or Italic grammar (e.g. the use of the subjunctive, without any conjunction, to express purpose, a clause prescribing a sacrifice to Ceres being followed immediately by pacrsi eituam amatens).

The form of the name is of interest, as it shows the suffix -NO- superimposed on the suffix -CO-, a change that probably indicates some conquest of an earlier tribe by the invading Safins (or Sabini).
