= Proto-Italic language =

Ancestor of Latin and other Italic languages

Proto-Italic
- Reconstruction of: Italic languages
- Region: Italian Peninsula
- Era: c. 1000 BC
- Reconstructed ancestor: Proto-Indo-European
- Lower-order reconstructions: Proto-Latino-Faliscan; Proto-Sabellic

The Proto-Italic language is the ancestor of the Italic languages, most notably Latin and its descendants, the Romance languages. It is not directly attested in writing but has been reconstructed to some degree through the comparative method. Proto-Italic descended from the earlier Proto-Indo-European language.

== History ==
Although an equation between archaeological and linguistic evidence cannot be established with certainty, the Proto-Italic language is generally associated with the Terramare (1700–1150 BC) and Proto-Villanovan cultures (1200–900 BC).

On the other hand, work in glottochronology has argued that Proto-Italic split off from the western Proto-Indo-European dialects some time before 2500 BC. It was originally spoken by Italic tribes north of the Alps before they moved south into the Italian Peninsula during the second half of the 2nd millennium BC. Linguistic evidence also points to early contacts with Celtic tribes and Proto-Germanic speakers.

== Development ==
A list of regular phonetic changes from Proto-Indo-European to Proto-Italic follows. Because Latin is the only well-attested Italic language, it forms the main source for the reconstruction of Proto-Italic. It is therefore not always clear whether certain changes apply to all of Italic (a pre-PI change), or only to Latin (a post-PI change), because of lack of conclusive evidence.

=== Obstruents ===
- Palatovelars merged with plain velars, a change termed centumization: *ḱ > *k, *ǵ > *g, *ǵʰ > *gʰ
  - Sequences of palatovelars and *w merged with labiovelars: *ḱw, *ǵw, *ǵʰw > *kʷ, *gʷ, *gʷʰ
- Perhaps *ke > *ka, or, in other words, *e > *a in front of pure velars. Given the existence of Oscan carneis and Umbrian karu beside Latin carō ("flesh, meat"), this sound change may date back to Proto-Italic. The linguist Peter Schrijver also explains Latin scelus ("an evil deed") as a derivative of a root *(s)kh₁el-, which would indicate that this sound change predated the loss of laryngeals between a consonant and a vowel, in which case the development would still be early. De Vaan, however, alternatively reconstructs the root of scelus as *skel-, arguing that the reconstruction preferred by Schrijver is unjustified.
- *p...kʷ assimilates to *kʷ...kʷ, a change also found in Celtic. It is possibly an Italo-Celtic development, or perhaps an independent innovation. The development of quercus ("an oak"), which reflects PIE *pérkʷus, appears to showcase that the assimilation of *p to *kʷ precedes the development of *kʷu to *ku. Alternatively, it is possible that the dissimilation of *kʷu to *ku was already a PIE development, in which case Italic must have regularly undergone the assimilation in the oblique cases (i.e. gen.sg. *pr̥kʷéw-), which then spread analogically to the other case forms. If this theory is accepted, then this particular lexical item provides no information regarding the relative chronology of these sound changes.
- Two adjacent dentals become two adjacent sibilants (TT > TsT > ss).
- Obstruent consonants become (unaspirated) voiceless before another voiceless consonant (usually *s or *t).
- *-kn- > *-gn-. This development appears in both Latin signum ("sign") and Oscan segúnú ("statues").
- Possible development of *k > *χ before an obstruent, followed by the loss of the nasal before the fricative and compensatory lengthening of the preceding vowel. As an example of this development, Meiser cites Oscan saahtúm ("sacred"), Umbrian sahatam, and sānctus ("sacred"). According to Meiser, these terms reflect a pre-form *sanktos, which developed into *sānxtos. Alternatively, the linguists Alessandro De Angelis and Annamaria Chilà reconstruct a development of *-Vnkt- > *-Ṽːkt-, adducing as evidence certain dialectal Latin terms that appear to showcase the loss of *-n-, such as sactus, which is attested in Minturnus. However, according to the linguist Ollie Sayeed, South Picene forms such as deíktam showcase that spirantization must postdate Proto-Italic. Moreover, Sayeed argues that the lengthening must have operated after the Common Italic period, as otherwise it would have been affected by Osthoff's Law, and also since—according to Sayeed—terms such as anhēlō ("to breathe out") show that it must postdate the specifically Latin a-weakening. Sayeed further notes that the spirantization rule operates in different conditions within the various Italic languages: In Sabellic, for instance, *pt sequences are affected (e.g. Umbrian screhto beside scriptus), whereas in Latin the development exclusively applies to *-nkt- sequences. Moreover, a change of *kt and *ks to *χt and *χs would then require a subsequent shift of *χt and *χs back to kt and ks in Latin.

- *tl > *kl word-medially. The existence of Sabellic forms such as Oscan sakaraklúm ("sanctuary") indicates that this development was shared between Latin and Osco-Umbrian, implying that it occurred at an early date. In Latin, the suffix *-klom was later modified by epenthesis, producing -culum (e.g. curriculum, "a race"). This development, however, may not have occurred in Venetic, where forms such as klovetlo perhaps shows the unchanged suffix *-tlom, in contrast to the Italic languages. The Etruscan form putlumza is probably related to Latin pōculum ("drinking cup"), from which it may have been borrowed, though it is also possible that it more specifically derives from an unattested equivalent word in another Italic language. In any case, the Etruscan form appears to have been borrowed at a stage prior to the shift of *tl > *kl.
- Final *t became *d. Bakkum posits that this development occurred prior to the apocope of final *i. Thus, the PIE secondary ending *-t became Proto-Italic *-d, but the primary ending *-ti became Proto-Italic *-t.
- Initial /mC/ > /bC/.
- CCCC > CaCCC. This development did not apply to word-initial position, as indicated by the development of PIE *n̥bʰrís to Latin imber ("rain") not *amber. Chronologically, it must have occurred after the vocalization of the syllabic resonants, as otherwise PIE *h₂ŕ̥ǵn̥tom ("silver") would have yielded *h₂ragnto-, which should have produced Latin *ragentum instead of the attested form argentum ("silver"). Nevertheless, the *ə that emerged from the vocalization of syllabic nasals would still develop into *a when followed by three consonants, thus PIE *h₂n-n̥-ḱ-y > *h₂n-ən-ḱ-y > Latin nancīscor ("to meet with"). The sound law also must have occurred after the shift of CRHC > CRəHC, thus explaining the development of PIE *ǵn̥h₁tós ("begotten") to nātus ("born"). Additionally, it must postdate the development of CRHTC > CRaTC, as otherwise PIE *gʰl̥Hdʰ-ro- would have yielded *gʰlaHdʰ-ro-, which would have produced *glāber instead of glaber ("smooth"). In any case, Schrijver suggests that the *a was probably not phonemic until after the vocalization of *CHC > *CaC.

==== Fricatives ====
- Voiced aspirates become fricatives. Word-initially, they become voiceless, while they are allophonically voiced word-medially. The PIE voiced aspirates became voiceless fricatives in both Latin and Sabellic, but voiced stops in Latin and voiced fricatives in Sabellic, which is explained by a reconstructed Proto-Italic system of initial voiceless fricatives and internal voiced fricatives.
  - Word-initial developments:
    - *bʰ > *pʰ > *f. See Latin frātēr ("brother") and Umbrian fratrom, from Proto-Italic *frātēr, from *bʰréh₂tēr. Venetic may also show evidence of the same sound change, such as perhaps in the form fouxontia, a personal name that may reflect PIE *bʰewg- ("to flee").
    - *dʰ > *f. See Latin faciō ("to make") and Oscan fakiiad, both from Proto-Italic *fakjō, from PIE *dʰh₁k-. This sound change also likely occurred in Venetic, as indicated by forms such as vhagsto (/faɡsto/, "offered"). De Vaan suggests that *θ served as a temporary intermediary between *dʰ and f.
    - *gʰ > *h. For evidence of this sound change, see Latin horior ("to encourage") and Oscan herest, from PIE *gʰer-. This same PIE root perhaps also yielded Venetic horeionte ("congratulating, glad"?).
    - *gʷʰ > *f
  - Word-medial developments:
    - *bʰ > *β. For evidence of this sound development, see Latin albus ("white") and Umbrian alfir, from PIE *albʰós.
    - *dʰ > *ð. For evidence of this sound development, see Latin medius ("middle") and Oscan mefiaí, from PIE *médʰyos.
    - *gʰ > *ɣ
    - *gʷʰ > *ɣʷ
- Development of *dʰw- > *fw- > *f-. According to Schrijver, this sound change must predate the shift of *wo- to *wa- in open syllables, so as to explain the development of PIE *dʰwor-om to *fworom, which then evolved into *forom, whence ultimately Latin forum.
- According to De Vaan, PIE *-ddʰ- yielded pre-Latin *-dzd-, which later became *-zd-, before eventually undergoing the regular deletion of *-z- accompanied by the compensatory lengthening of a preceding vowel. De Vaan postulates this development to explain Latin crēdō ("to trust"), which reflects PIE *ḱréddʰeh₁ti ("to believe, trust").

===== Sibilants =====
- *s was possibly allophonically voiced to *z in intervocalic position. The *z usually—with only a select few apparent exceptions—underwent rhotacism in Latin, though the original nonrhotic forms are preserved in Old Latin inscriptions, such as iovesāt, an archaic variant of iūrat ("to confirm formally"). Rhotacism also occurred in Umbrian and Faliscan, also indicating the existence of a voiced *z in the prehistory of these languages that would have served as the first stage of the sound change. Such a development did not occur in Oscan, where the appearance of forms such as egmazum indicates that only the voicing of *s had been completed during the phase of Italic unity, followed by later rhotacism in some of the daughter languages. Other linguists have expressed doubts regarding the Proto-Italic nature of the development—the linguist Gabriel Bakkum, for instance, argues that intervocalic voicing is a common phenomenon crosslinguistically, allowing for the possibility that these sound changes occurred independently in the various Italic languages rather than at the Proto-Italic stage itself. According to another philologist, Nicholas Zair, though it is possible for the voicing to have occurred independently, there is still no particular reason why it cannot belong to an early period.

Weiss argues that Latin maximus ("highest") implies that intervocalic *s remained unvoiced at the time of certain Latin syncopations, provided that this term had emerged from earlier *magisomos. Weiss does also mention the possibility of a development *magizomos > *magzomos > maximus. Nevertheless, on the basis, Weiss argues that the voicing was probably not a Proto-Italic sound change, but instead an independent innovation that spread across multiple languages. Fortson accepts this line of reasoning, stating that Weiss is "probably right," though Schrijver dismisses his arguments as "uncompelling," stating that *-gz- could easily have become -ks- provided that *s still "had a wide allophonic spectrum." Weiss would later specify that *s must have remained to trigger the devoicing of *g to *k, thereby showcasing that the voicing of intervocalic *s must have occurred after the syncope of *-i-. However, according to the linguist Teigo Onishi, phonemic */magisomo-/ was phonetically realized as *[magizomo-], but—following the syncope of *-i-—the underlying */s/ was realized as *[s] phonetically, thereby allowing for the same devoicing to occur within Latin.
Weiss notes that voicing of intervocalic *s is always, at least to his knowledge, accompanied by the voicing of *s in postvocalic and presonorant position. There is evidence for such a development in Oscan, where the form αιζνιω ("aizniō," "of bronze") might reflect *aeznos. According to Onishi, *s may not just have already been realized as *z before *n in Proto-Italic, but also before any liquid or nasal (i.e. *-sn-, *-sm-, *-sl-, *-sr- were realized as *-zn-, *-zm-, *-zl-, *-zr-), though he notes that there is little evidence available to allow an assessment of *-sl- and *-sm- sequences in Proto-Italic. There was a development within Latin whereby word-medial *s was lost before *-l-, *-n-, or *-m-, followed by the compensatory lengthening of the preceding vowel. Weiss more specifically connects this development to the loss of a putative voiced *z in these sequences. Thus, according to Weiss, a pre-form *kaznos yielded Latin cānus ("white"), which is cognate with Paelignian casnar. Onishi, likewise, accepts this sound change, arguing—for instance—that a pre-form *prīsmo- yielded Proto-Italic *prīzmo-, which eventually produced Latin primus ("first") and Paelignian Prismu. However, Onishi also suggests that this compensatory lengthening does not require *z as an intermediary stage, and therefore cannot be used as definitive evidence to support the existence of voiced *z in this position at the Proto-Italic level.
The linguist Gerhard Meiser suggests that *s also became voiced when adjacent to liquids, though another philologist—Jane Stuart-Smith—notes that this development may not appear in Umbrian, which implies that the voicing in this particular environment was not a Proto-Italic sound change but instead an independent development occurring independently within various languages. Stuart-Smith also notes that the only evidence for an inherited cluster consisting of an *s adjacent to a liquid in Umbrian is the term tursitu ("to scare away"), which potentially reflects *torsetōd. According to Stuart-Smith, there is no evidence indicating that the -s- in the Umbrian term was voiced, and—even if it became voiced at some point within Umbrian—such a development must not have happened during Proto-Italic. Otherwise, original *-rs- would have merged with the innovative *-rs- sequences within Umbrian (i.e. clusters of *-rs- in pre-Umbrian that were not directly inherited but emerged secondarily from other Proto-Italic sequences). These secondary *-rs- sequences were perhaps realized as [-rz-] and may appear in attested Umbrian texts as -⟨rf⟩- (e.g. parfam, from *parezam). On the basis of this Umbrian evidence, Stuart-Smith completely dismisses the idea that voicing adjacent to a liquid had already occurred within Proto-Italic.
In contrast to Stuart-Smith, Onishi—according to his proposed syllabification rules—supports a general devoicing of *[z] in front of *-r- in Umbrian linguistic prehistory, thereby preventing the existence of any sequence *-rzV- in pre-Umbrian. Moreover, the veracity of the change of Proto-Italic *-rVz- to Umbrian -⟨rf⟩- is disputed, with linguists such as Blanca María Prósper entirely rejecting the existence of this development. Regardless, according to Onishi, evidence from Latin still indicates that the *s in original *-rs- sequences remained unvoiced. In Latin, *-rs- clusters assimilated into -rr-, whereas *-sr- sequences developed into -br- (e.g. PIE *ḱerh₂srom > Latin cerebrum). Onishi argues that, should both of these sequences contained voiced *z, it would be unclear why *z yielded Latin b only when positioned before *-r-, whereas medial PIE *-dʰ- yielded b both before and after *-r-. The Latin development of *-rs- and *-ls- sequences to -rr- -ll- have been explained through an intermediary *[-Rz-], though Onishi suggests that these assimilatory developments could have occurred without such a pre-form.

- Proposed rhotacism of *sw > *rw already within Proto-Italic. This sound law was first posited by the linguist Helmut Rix in order to explain the development of terms such as Latin Minerva, Oscan Menere(vas), and Paelignian Minerua. Rix derives these terms from earlier *Menerwā, itself perhaps from *menes-wéh₂, which emerged from *ménos ("mind"). Worship of the Etruscan goddess Menerva is attested in the 6h-century BCE, showcasing that the sound change—if accepted—must predate this time, yet—as Rix argues—this period precedes the regular innovative rhotacism in the Italic daughter languages. Another major piece of evidence for the operation of this sound law in Italic is the Latin word caterva ("crowd, band, retinue") and the Umbrian denominative verb kateramu ("to arrange oneself in ranks"), both of which may derive from a pre-form *katerwā ("company, band of people"), itself perhaps from the neuter s-stem *katos ("chain"). Furthermore, Rix adduced as evidence several Latin terms without any known Italic cognates, those being acervus ("heap"), protervus ("violent"), and furvus ("dark, gloomy").

The existence of this rule is contested, and the evidence cited by Rix has been thoroughly criticized. Fortson argues that the etymology of the name Minerva is not easily connectable with PIE *men- ("to think") as others have stipulated, noting that she was worshipped in Etruria before coming to Rome, and that her earliest characterization was as a goddess of lightning and war, whereas her associations with wisdom emerged after she had been equated with Athena. Moreover, Fortson argues that Umbrian mersus ("correct") reflects earlier *medes-wo-, implying that the sound change postdates the Proto-Italic period. In contrast, Meiser argues that Etruscan Mera provides indirect evidence for an Umbrian form that showcases that sound change of *-sw- to *-rw-. According to Meiser, an Umbrian word of the shape *menerra was borrowed into Etruscan, before syncopating into *menerra and then assimilating into *menra. Regarding caterva, the linguist John Clayton alternatively explains the term as the result of a pre-Proto-Italic sound law whereby *rw metathesized into *rw when in onsets within a syllable. For instance, Clayton proposes that a PIE heteroclitic noun *ḱátwr̥ ("hostility") underwent thematicization into *katwr-ā- in pre-Proto-Italic, before then metathesizing into Proto-Italic *katr̥wā (syllabified as *katr̥·wā). The secondary Proto-Italic *r̥ then evolved into *er, yielding Latin caterva.

=== Vowels and sonorants ===
- V̄LV́ > V̆LV. Otherwise known as Dybo's Law, this sound change maintains that post-PIE long-vowels shortened before a liquid and a stressed vowel. Thus, PIE *wiHró- yielded Proto-Italic *wiros ("a man"). This sound law is common to Italic and Celtic, perhaps allowing for the possibility that it dates to the Italo-Celtic period. The conditions for Dybo's Law require that *VH had already yielded *V̄ beforehand, which would naturally indicate that this development is also of Italo-Celtic date.
- V̄RC > V̆RC. Otherwise known as Osthoff's Law, this sound change predicts the shortening of a long vowel prior to a resonant followed by a consonant. Thus, PIE *h₂wéh₁-n̥t- yielded *wēnto-, whence later *wento-, ultimately producing ventus. However, alternative explanations exist for ventus. According to Sayeed, the PIE sequence *eHRC should have been syllabified as [*eHR̥C], which could undergo the loss of the laryngeal without any other developments, as laryngeals in Proto-Indo-European only induced compensatory lengthening when in coda position. Thus, the sequence [*eHR̥C] could yield *eR̥C, which may itself evolve directly eRC, thereby negating the need for Osthoff's law. Alternatively, it is still possible that speakers would preserve the weight and duration of the vowel in *eR̥C, thus prompting a shift to *ēR̥C, in which case it could then still undergo Osthoff shortening to produce eR̥C. Forms such as Oscan stahínt (< PIt *sta(j)ēnt) may actively contradict the existence of Osthoff's law, though it is alternatively possible that the vocalism of this term in particular was analogically introduced from the third-person singular form staít.
- *RDC > *RaDC. This rule explains the development of Proto-Italic *magnos from PIE *mǵ-no-. This sound change date back to the Italo-Celtic period.
- *owV > *awV in pretonic position. Otherwise known as Thurneysen–Havet's law. Since PIE *ew did not yield Latin *av, this sound law must predate the change of *ew > *ow. Furthermore, since this sound law requires a mobile accent to function properly, it most likely occurred at an extremely archaic date before the word-initial accent of Proto-Italic. The Umbrian term sauitu ("to wound"?), which might reflect PIE *ksow-éye-ti, perhaps serves as additional evidence for this development in Italic.
- *mo > *ma and *wo > *wa in open syllables. This development explains terms such as Latin mare ("sea"), which reflects PIE *móri. Terms such as mola ("millstone"), which may reflect PIE *molh₂éh₂, and vorō (" devour"), which is potentially a denominative to *gʷorh₃éh₂, perhaps do not show this sound change as the syllable was originally closed before the word-medial laryngeal. If this proposition is accepted, it would imply that these sound changes occurred prior to the development of *CHV > *CV.
- Possible apocope of final *i in certain conditions. This change seemingly affected the PIE second and third-person endings of verbs *-si, *-ti, and *-nti, all of which became -s, -t, and -nt. Such apocope was not limited to verbs exclusively; it is also, for instance, present in Proto-Italic *et ("and"), from *éti. There are, however, certain attested forms that may showcase the preservation of final *-i. In the Carmen Saliare, there appears an archaic Old Latin form tremonti, which possibly continues the original PIE third-person plural ending *-nti. Another inscription composed in the possibly Italic Elymian language includes the word εμι ("emi," "I am"), which contradicts the first-person singular form *ezom reconstructable for the other Italic languages. The linguist Michael Weiss thus doubts whether the apocope was truly a Proto-Italic development, suggesting that it was perhaps alternatively a "diffused change."

The apocope was perhaps conditioned by accent placement; the unstressed verbal endings, for instance, underwent this sound change, whereas it did not affect terms such as ante ("before"), which is cognate with Ancient Greek ἀντί (antí, "opposite"). In the case of a term such as pede, the ablative singular of pēs ("foot"), the retention of final *-i is explained as the result of inheritance from a PIE locative singular form *pedí. If this theory is accepted, then it would imply that the sound change occurred prior to the development of word-initial stress in Italic. However, the linguists James Clackson and Geoffrey Horrocks argue that not all locative singular forms contained a stressed final *-í and Latin neuter nouns such as mare ("sea," from *mori) most likely never placed the accent on the final *-i. As noted by the Indo-Europeanist scholar Helmut Rix, one problematic term is the ablative singular form genere, which belongs to the noun genus ("race, kind"). The ablative singular form specifically should reflect *ǵénh₁esi, the expected outcome of which—according to the accent-conditioned theory of the apocope—would be *genis. To resolve these issues, the theory would have to rely on a widespread analogically motivated restoration of final *-i throughout multiple inflectional paradigms.

- Possible loss of *w after labial obstruents. This development is attested in probus ("good"), Oscan prúfatted ("to approve"), and Paelignian pros, which all derive Proto-Italic *proβos, from earlier *proβwos, probably from PIE *probʰHwós.
- Developments concerning *y:
  - *-mj- > *-nj-. Chronologically, this sound development must have occurred at a period where the consonantal yod remained after *m. This development is exemplified by the change of *gʷm̥yóh₂ to *gʷenjō, which ultimately yielded Latin veniō ("to come"). The rule did not, however, affect dormiō (< *dr̥m-yé-ti), probably as a consequence of PIE syllabification laws. The sequence *gʷm̥y-, with a syllabic *m̥, yields veni-, whereas *dr̥my-—with a syllabic *r̥—yields dormi-. Had the original PIE form been syllabified as *drm̥y-, the expected Latin outcome would have been *dreniō. Certain linguists have expressed doubt regarding the existence of this sound law—the philologist Benjamin Fortson IV notes that is essentially only supported by veniō, with the possible additional example of quoniam (< *kʷom-jam?), though this conjunction is not necessarily ancient. Both of these examples have alternative explanations: quoniam may result from a labial dissimilation and veniō perhaps underwent remodeling after the PIE aorist *gʷémt ("to step, come"). Another theory, posited by Sihler, attributes the sound change of *gʷem- > *gʷen- to a dissimilatory development. Furthermore, Fortson argues that the rule is potentially contradicted by the derivation of moveō ("to move, set in motion") from *myewh₁- ("to move"). To resolve this issue, Weiss postulates separate developments for word-initial and word-medial *mj, with the former yielding Latin *m- and the latter evolving into Proto-Italic *-nj-.
  - Possible assimilation of *-gy- to *-yy- and *-dy- to *-yy-. Oscan terms such as mais (< *majjos < *mag-jos) provide evidence that the sound shift of *-gy- to *-yy- also occurred in Sabellic, thereby indicating that this development is of Proto-Italic date. The Umbrian term aiu may provide additional evidence of this sound development in Sabellic, though the etymology of this term is unclear. However, this sound law is perhaps contradicted by fugiō ("to flee"), which may reflect PIE *bʰug-yé-ti. Schrijver interprets this form as further evidence for his proposed class of athematic i-presents, arguing that this issue is easily resolvable if it is presumed that the formed lacked consonantal yod. Alternatively, Sihler suggests that it may have been formed innovatively within Italic after the operation of the sound law. There is also evidence for the shift of *-dy- to *-yy- in Oscan, as indicated by the term oiim ("hate"), which may reflect *ojjom, from *odjom. This development must have occurred prior to the Latin shift of word-medial *dʰ > *d, as it does not affect Latin medius ("middle").
  - Treatment of *j following a consonant. In the prehistory of Latin, all *-Cj- evolved into *-Cij-. This sound development perhaps occurred over two different stages, with the first phase exclusively affecting consonantal yod when situated after heavy syllables. Latin showcases a second anaptyxis during which all remaining *-Cj- sequences still eventually vocalized to *-Ciy- (e.g. *médʰyos > Latin medius ("middle"). Sabellic, however, may showcase the preservation of other *-Cj- clusters. In the scripts of the Osco-Umbrian languages, the glide *-j- is perhaps transcribed orthographically by the grapheme -i-.
  - *j is lost between vowels. The resulting vowels in hiatus contract into a long vowel if the two vowels are the same. For an example of this sound change, Meiser cites Oscan trís and Latin trēs ("three"), both from PIE *tréyes. According to Nishimura, it is possible that the intervocalic *j, though lost phonemically, was possibly retained allophonically.

- Possible developments leading to the differentiation between the third-conjugation iō-verbs and the fourth conjugation:

- Possible reduction of unstressed *-ey- to *-iy-. The linguist Brent Vine posits this rule to explain the development of fourth-conjugation denominatives to thematic nouns in Italic. According to Vine, a verb such as *serwiō ("to observe") reflects *serwiye-, itself from *serweyé-, which was itself formed as a standard denominative in *-yéti to a thematic noun. Moreover, this rule also justifies his proposed derivation of sōpiō ("to put to sleep") from *swṓp-eye-ti, which—according to Vine—first evolved into *swṓp-ije-ti before eventually contracting into the attested form sōpiō. If accepted, this rule would have to operate at an extremely early period, prior to the establishment of fixed initial stress and the loss of intervocalic yod.
- Epenthesis of *i before *y after, according to Weiss, a heavy syllable. Such a sound law is partially evidenced by the distribution of third conjugation iō-verbs and fourth conjugation terms according to syllable structure—All verbs of the former class, in Latin, have short root syllables (i.e. of the shape CVC), whereas all terms of the latter type have long roots (i.e. of the shapes CVCC, CV̄C, CVi/uC). Weiss argues that since, according to this rule, syllables ending in a sonorant behave like heavy syllables, it is probable that syllable-final sonorants were moraic, but obstruents in the same position were not. Chronologically, this sound change must have preceded the assimilation of *-gy-, as otherwise PIE *séh₂gyeti ("to seek out") would not have yielded Latin sāgiō ("to perceive"). According to this sound law, PIE *gʷm̥yési should yield early Proto-Italic *gʷenijesi and PIE *sént-ye-si should yield early Proto-Italic *sent-ije-si. This development is reminiscent of Siever's Law, though it is perhaps a separate, albeit similar phenomenon unique to Italic.
- Development of *-Cije- to *-Cī-. Weiss proposes a model whereby *-Cije- syncopated to *-Cij-, which eventually contracted to *-Cī-. However, it has also been proposed that the *e in *-ije- sequences assimilated to the preceding *i in an open syllable when in an unaccented position, thus allowing for a development of *-ije- to *-iji-, which nevertheless still contracted to *-ī-. In any case, early Proto-Italic *gʷenijesi yielded *gʷenīs, whence Latin venīs. If Oscan diíviiaí is connected with Latin dīus ("radiant, divine") and derived from Proto-Italic *dīwijos, from PIE *diyew-iyo-, then it would imply that this reduction had occurred prior to the shift of *ew > *ow. Furthermore, if Gaulish diíiuion is connected to the aforementioned forms, then it might illustrate that this reduction is of Proto-Italo-Celtic date.
- In open syllables, *-Cje- became *-Ci-. Thus, early Proto-Italic *fakjetōd became later *fakitōd, which developed into Oscan factud and Latin facitō. The linguist Reiner Lipp supports a model by which, in open unstressed syllables, *-Cje- reduced to *-Cji- and then developed into *-Ci-. According to Lipp, such a development necessitates that the fixed initial-stress system had already emerged. Weiss, however, explains this development as the result of the syncopation of the *-e- after *-i- in an open syllable. The sequence *-Cjo- does not appear to have been affected by a similar change, as indicated by the genitive singular ending -osio in archaic Latin and Faliscan (i.e. Faliscan kaisiosio), in which case forms such as Latin capimus (<*kapjomos) must have emerged analogically after other terms such as capitis. Vine extends the ruler to closed syllables, arguing that syncope also occurred in the sequence *-eyes, which he suggests developed into *-ijes according to his proposed reduction rule, before syncopating into the archaic nominative plural -īs (e.g. in Marrucinian pacris). However, Fortson doubts the operation of this syncope in open syllables, citing participle forms in -iēns and gerunds in -iendus, as possible counterevidence.
Many of these sound changes explain the split between the third conjugation iō-type and the fourth conjugation in the Italic languages. Thus, if accepted, they are thus at least of Proto-Italic date, considering that both Latin and Sabellic contain these two separate conjugation classes. However, Schrijver rejects the aforementioned developments, arguing that certain terms imply the preservation of consonantal yod in *ye-presents up to the Proto-Italic period. For instance, Schrijver cites the verb sepeliō ("to bury"), from earlier *sepel-jV, must have retained the nonsyllabic post-consonantal *j to explain the non-operation of Exon's Law, a sound development in archaic Latin whereby tetrasyllabic sequences with two light medial syllables (e.g. sequences of the shape *XX̆X̆X) in Proto-Italic underwent the syncopation of the second vowel. One method to resolve this issue in accordance with the theory of i-epenthesis is to presume that the verb was originally third conjugation but later remodeled into a fourth conjugation form. Schrijver further argues that the theory of epenthesis fails to account for the coexistence of third and fourth conjugation verbs containing roots ending in the resonant -r, such as the third conjugation verbs morior ("to die") and pariō ("to beget") and the fourth conjugation terms operiō ("to cover") and feriō ("to hit, strike"). Weiss tentatively explains this variation as the result of some analogical development, noting that many of these verbs belong to the same semantic field. For instance, the verb pariō can be construed as the causative to orior ("to rise, be born"), to which morior is an antonym.
De Vaan also disputes the notion that third-conjugation iō-verbs are connectable with the PIE thematic *ye-suffix, instead opting to derive verbs of this type from an ablauting athematic PIE *i-present class of the shape *CC-éy-ti ~ *CC-y-énti. According to this theory, the zero-grade suffix was generalized throughout the paradigm, and the original athematic first-person singular and third-person plural endings were thematicized. For instance, regarding the example of Latin capiō ("to take, capture"), Schrijver reconstructs a Proto-Italic form *kapiti ~ *kapienti, and De Vaan further connects the verb to a PIE form *kh₂p-i- or *kap-i-. The LIV, however, connects this verb to *kh₂pyéti ("to be grasping"), whence also Ancient Greek κάπτω ("káptō," "to gulp down") and Gothic hafjan ("to lift, raise"). According to Schrijver, the athematic i-presents were thematicized to ordinary ye-presents in compounds, thus explaining the existence of many simplex third conjugation iō-verbs beside compounded fourth conjugation terns. For example, pariō ("to bear, give birth") exists beside forms such as comperiō ("to learn, discover"). Furthermore, in the case of orior, De Vaan notes the existence of third conjugation forms such as oritur beside fourth conjugation forms such as orīrī, which he explains as the result as of an original athematic i-present *h₃r-i-. In this particular example, De Vaan further cites Hittite a-ra-a-i (< *h₃r-oi- ~ *h₃r-i-) as evidence for an original PIE ablauting i-stem. Weiss, however, argues that the proposed phonological changes motivating the distinction between the third conjugation iō-type and the fourth conjugation are attested in other words not related to any verbal paradigm, rendering it uneconomical to posit an entirely new morphological class to justify developments already explained by sound law.

- *ew > *ow. This sound change is attested for both Latino-Faliscan and Sabellic. However, there a select few odd forms that appear to lack this sound development. For instance, the term Leucesie appears in the Carmen Saliare, though De Vaan argues that it cannot overrule the other evidence for the Proto-Italic nature of the *ew > *ow shift, on account of its uncertain meaning and etymology. The forms neuen and neuna, which are attested at Ardea and Tor Tignosa respectively, also seemingly contradict this sound shift, though it also possible that they underwent a secondary development of *ow > *ew, which has also occurred in British English. Weiss notes that all of the unusual forms contain the -eu- after a coronal consonant, thereby allowing for the possibility of a dialectal change of *ow > *ew in front of a coronal.
- *l̥, *r̥ > *ol, *or. This sound change seemingly also occurred in Venetic terms such as murtuvoí ("dead"), which may reflect PIE *mr̥twós.

=== Laryngeals ===
The laryngeals are a class of hypothetical PIE sounds *h₁, *h₂, *h₃ that usually disappeared in late PIE, leaving coloring effects on adjacent vowels. Their disappearance left some distinctive sound combinations in Proto-Italic. In the changes below, the # follows standard practice in denoting a word boundary; that is, # at the beginning denotes word-initial. H denotes any of the three laryngeals.

The simpler Italic developments of laryngeals are shared by many other Indo-European branches:

- *h₁e > *e, *h₂e > *a, *h₃e > *o
- *eh₁ > *ē, *eh₂ > *ā, *eh₃ > *ō
- *iH > *ī, *oH > *ō, *uH > *ū
- Sometimes CHiC > Cī
- *H > *a between consonants. This development also occurs in Celtic and is therefore possibly of Italo-Celtic date.
- Possible development of *HTC > *aTC. There are only two potential examples of this sound change: aiō and apiō, both of which have somewhat contentious etymologies. Nevertheless, if accepted, Schriver suggests that it is comparable to the sound change of *RDC > *RaDC.
- Laryngeals are lost word-initially before a consonant.
- Laryngeals are lost word-medially between stops. Given the correspondence between Oscan futír and Gaulish duxtir (< PIE *dʰugh₂tḗr), this sound law is perhaps of Italo-Celtic date.
- Possible delabialization of *h₃ before *w. According to this sound law, the laryngeal *h₃ lost its labial quality prior to *w, thus shifting into *h₂. Schrijver posits this rule to explain forms such as octāvus ("eighth"), which may reflect PIE *h₃ḱteh₃-wo-. If accepted, it must have occurred at an extremely early date, as it requires that *-eh₃- and *-ō- remained distinct. It has also been suggested the sequence *-eh₃w- evolved into *-ōw-, which then unrounded to *-āw-. However, such a development would not explain the vocalism of ōvum ("egg"), which continues PIE *h₂ōwyóm. There is another formulation of the *-ōw- > *-āw- shift whereby the development was stress conditioned and thus only affected non-initial syllables.

More characteristic of Italic are the interactions of laryngeals with sonorant consonants. Here, R represents a sonorant, T a plosive, L a liquid, and C a consonant.

- #HLC > #aLC. This development appears in Latin argentum, from PIE *h₂ŕ̥ǵn̥tom. The Oscan term aragetud ("money") attests to an identical sound change in Sabellic. However, Latin ursus ("bear"), which reflects *h₂ŕ̥tḱos, conflicts with this development. Schrijver notes that, even if one assumes a regular sound change of *HLC- > *oLC, the form ursus would still be unusual as *orsus would be expected. This particular word was possibly affected by some sort of tabooistic distortion, such as the kind potentially also present in lupus ("wolf," from *wĺ̥kʷos). Given the extreme irregularity of the formation, Schrijver sees fit to discard it as evidence for the standard development of PIE *#HLC sequences. The vocalism of orior ("to rise, get up") and ortom ("risen"), which perhaps reflect *h₃r̥-yé-ti, may also conflict with this sound law. To remedy this issue, Schrijver notes that there are other full-grade ye-presents, such as sāgiō ("to perceive"), thereby also allowing for the possibility that orior continues the e-grade of the PIE root. Nevertheless, Schrijver suggests a possible double reflex of *#HLC wherein *#h₁LC and *#h₂LC yielded #aLC and *#h₃LC yielded #oLC, perhaps via a development of *#h₃LC > *#h₃aLC > #oLC. There are other examples that seemingly contradict a rule *#h₃LC > oLC, such as arbor ("tree") (< perhaps from *h₃r̥dʰ-ōs) and arduus (< *h₃r̥dʰ-wó-s), though Schrijver considers the etymology of both these terms to be problematic. For a possible reflex of PIE *#h₁LC, Schrijver cites ariēs ("ram"), which may reflect PIE *h₁r-i-(e)t-, though the Umbrian cognate erietu has problematic e-vocalism and De Vaan allows for the possibility of a Proto-Italic pre-form either of the shape *ariēts or *eriēts.
- There was possibly a triple reflex of PIE *#HNC. If accepted, the following developments would have occurred:
  - *h₁NC- > *h₁əNC- > *əNC-. Schrijver suggests that *h₁ was lost a segment prior to the sound law *CəCCC > *CaCCC, as this is necessary to explain the development of Latin ignis. According to Schrijver, it follows a development of *h₁n̥gʷni- > *h₁əngʷni- > *əngʷni- > ignis.
  - *h₂NC- > *h₂əNC- > *aNC-. For example, PIE *h₂m̥bʰí ("around") > PIt *amβi- > La. ambi- and Um. am-.
  - *h₃NC- > *h₃əNC- > *oNC-. The examples unguis ("fingernail"), which may reflect *h₃n̥gʰ-u-, and also umbilīcus ("navel"), which may reflect *h₃m̥bʰ-, the zero-grade of *h₃nóbʰōl ("navel"), are considered by the linguist Stefan Höfler to constitute particularly compelling evidence for the operation of this sound law in Latin. Nevertheless, Höfler suggests that these forms may instead reflect schwebeablaut rather than the PIE zero-grade, though—in both cases—Schrijver argues that schwebeablaut is unlikely as the phenomenon would not have operated within a single paradigm.

This sound law is contested by Höfler, who argues that the syllabic resonants merely vocalized normally to either eN or oR. Höfler cites examples such as ēnsis ("dagger"), which may reflect *h₂n̥sís, though the etymology of this term is controversial.

- CLHV > CaLV. There is some evidence, albeit scant, attesting to this same sound development in Sabellic: Compare Umbrian carsitu to Latin calō ("to call"). This sound change must have occurred prior to the development of *l̥, *r̥ > *ol, *or, as otherwise *CLHV should have yielded *CoLHV, which itself would have produced CoL(V). Moreover, it occurred after the vocalization of syllabic resonants and the loss of laryngeals.
- h₂s# > ks# after an unstressed vowel. This sound law was proposed by André Martinet to explain senex ("old") and -trĩx without the need of an additional *-k- suffix of unknown meaning that would only be seen in Italic. The lengthed vowel in the suffix -trĩx could be explained by a restoration from a lost **-trī suffix. If this law were to be accepted, it would be the only example of a laryngeal being realized as a consonant in Italic.

==== *CRHC sequences ====
- CRHTC > CRaTC. Schrijver utilizes this rule to explain terms such as fragrō ("to emit a smell") and glaber. To explain this sound law, De Vaan suggests that the laryngeal might have disappeared "before the putative allophonic prop vowel was phonologized." All known instances of this development occur with a sequence containing a liquid.
- CRHC > CRāC. According to Schrijver, the development was more specifically *CRHC > *CRəHC > *CRāC. This sound development must have occurred prior to the general vocalization of *n̥ and *m̥ in order to explain trāns ("across") from *tr̥h₂n̥t-s, as otherwise the PIE term in question would have developed into *tr̥Hens and then *tarens. Phonologically, this sound law faces issues when dealing with *ClHw sequences, which should have yielded Proto-Italic *Clāw- according to this rule. However, the PIE pre-forms *sl̥H-wo- and *kl̥H-wo- may have actually yielded *salVwos and *kalVwos respectively. To remedy this issue, it has been suggested that some of these terms alternatively reflect pre-forms with a thematicized suffix *-ewo-, as in a putative form *sl̥H-ewo-, which may have emerged from the thematicization of an ablauting stem *solH-us ~ *sl̥H-éw-. However, Prósper criticizes this explanation as "artificial," noting that the Italic forms would be the only trace of earlier stem ablaut. Other sonorants were seemingly unaffected by this unusual development, as indicated by gnāvus (< *ǵn̥h₃wós) and rāmus (< *wr̥h₂dmos). It is theoretically possible that these forms reflect the full-grade, though—according to Prósper—there is no basis for such an assumption.
- Perhaps *CṚ́HC.C > *CəR.Hə.C > *CaRa.C. Otherwise known as the palma-rule, this sound law explains the form palma ("palm of the hand") as opposed to Proto-Celtic *ɸlāmā. It is, however, controversial, with only the form palma itself serving as a clear example. If the coexistence of two separate stress-based outcomes of *CRHC sequences in Italic is accepted, then it would imply the existence of a mobile accent in an archaic layer of Italic. Schrijver harshly criticizes the sound law on this exact basis—it is reliant upon specific accent placements, for which there is rarely significant supporting evidence. Little is known about the accent rules of pre-Proto-Italic, and any assumption made about prehistoric Proto-Italic accent is invariably at least somewhat premised upon the existence of an exact correspondence in another Indo-European branch that contains for evidence for the PIE accent system. Similarly, Prósper has argued that the relation between the palma-rule and stress is usually ascribed ex post facto to explain the attested forms. Moreover, Prósper has criticized the rule for necessitating an "unsupported" syncope of the second *a.

Alternatively, Prósper has proposed a development *CṚ́C.C > *Cə́RC.C > *CáR.C. According to Prósper, this sound change, if accepted, would merely serve as an example of the CCCC > CaCCC rule advocated by Schrijver. Prósper proposes that all PIE *CRC.C sequences developed an epenthetic schwa vowel due to the vocalization of the syllabic resonant, thus becoming *CəRC.C. For instance, such a development is visible in sarciō, which may reflect PIE *sr̥ḱ-yé-ti. In specifically *CRH.C sequences, the added schwa vowel provided a new syllabic nucleus, ultimately allowing the laryngeal to function as a normal consonant. Once the sequence *Cə́RC.C had emerged, the central vowel—according to Prósper—then lowered under the stress.

- Perhaps *ClH.C > *Col.C when the *l is in a labial environment and when the second consonant is prevocalic stop. More specifically, this development would involve the insertion of a phonetic schwa vowel between the consonant and the *l, creating a [CəlHC] sequence, which would then follow the same development as *CR̥C sequences. According to Prósper, since sounds in the coda of the same syllable are particularly vulnerable to fusion, the *l sound became velarized or pharyngealized, resulting in the subsequent loss of the laryngeal. The form plānus ("level, flat"), which may reflect *pl̥h₂-nó-s, is perhaps contradictory to this rule, though Prósper suggests that if the sound change originally only served to repair unstable clusters such as *ml-, *kʷl-, and *wl-, whereas the more stable *pl- sequences were unaffected. Overall, Prósper posits this entire sound development on the basis of forms such as cultus ("tilled, cultivated"), which—if this rule is accepted—could regularly continue *kʷl̥h₁-tós. However, such forms have been alternatively explained as innovative inner-Italic developments created analogically to other perfect participles, though Prósper argues that such a theory does not explain the tendency for these diachronically unusual participle forms to belong to roots with a labial preceding a laryngeal.

=== Morphology ===
- General loss of the dual, with only a few relics remaining.
- Loss of the instrumental case.
- Formation of the subjunctive in imperfect subjunctive in *-sē-.
- Formation of the imperfect indicative in *-βā-.
- Creation of the gerundive.

== Phonology ==
=== Consonants ===
Proto-Italic consonants
Type	Bilabial	Dental	Alveolar	Palatal	Velar	Labial–velar
Nasal	m		n		ŋ	
Plosive	p b	t d			k ɡ	kʷ ɡʷ
Fricative	ɸ β	θ ð	s z		x ɣ	xʷ ɣʷ
Trill			r			
Lateral			l			
Approximant				j		w

- [ŋ] was an allophone of /n/ before a velar consonant.
- The voiced fricatives [β], [ð], [ɣ], [ɣʷ] and [z] were in complementary distribution with word-initial voiceless fricatives [ɸ], [θ], [x], [xʷ] and [s], and were thus originally simply allophones of each other. However, at some point in the Proto-Italic period, the allophony was somewhat disrupted by the loss of the voiceless allophones [θ] and [xʷ], which merged with [ɸ]. Scholars disagree on whether to reconstruct Proto-Italic with the phonemes /θ ~ ð/ and /xʷ ~ ɣʷ/ still present (hence assuming that the merger with [ɸ] was a later areal change that spread across all extant dialects, possibly occurring simultaneous with or after the loss of the corresponding voiced fricatives), or to reconstruct Proto-Italic with the phonemes' voiceless allophones merged into /ɸ ~ β/, and their voiced allophones becoming independent phonemes /ð/, /ɣʷ/. Both of these sounds are relatively uncommon cross-linguistically, and eventually they were eliminated in all later languages, but differently in each.

=== Vowels ===
Short vowels
Type	Front	Central	Back
Close	i		u
Mid	e	o	
Open	a		

Long vowels
Type	Front	Central	Back
Close	iː		uː
Mid	eː		oː
Open	aː		

- The Proto-Indo-European syllabic nasals *m̥ and *n̥ appear in Latin as *em, *en or *im, *in, but also as *am, *an in Osco-Umbrian alongside *em, *en. On the basis of these discrepancies, Meiser reconstructs a nasal vowel /ẽ/ as this prop vowel, citing how Old French /ẽ/ evolved to modern French /ɑ̃/ as a parallel. Word-initial *n̥- in Proto-Indo-European evolved into Sabellic an- and Latin im-, leading some linguists to reconstruct *n̥- as a distinct syllabic resonant at the Proto-Italic stage as well. Older research by the philologist James Wilson Poultney instead suggests that Proto-Indo-European *m̥ and *n̥ evolved into *em and *en.

Proto-Italic had the following diphthongs:

- Short: *ai, *ei, *oi, *au, *ou
- Long: *āi, *ēi, *ōi

Osthoff's law remained productive in Proto-Italic. This caused long vowels to shorten when they were followed by a sonorant and another consonant in the same syllable: VːRC > VRC. As the long diphthongs were also VːR sequences, they could only occur word-finally, and were shortened elsewhere. Long vowels were also shortened before word-final *-m. This is the cause of the many occurrences of short *-a- in, for example, the endings of the ā-stems or of ā-verbs.

=== Prosody ===
Proto-Italic words may have had a fixed stress on the first syllable, a stress pattern which probably existed in most descendants in at least some periods. In Latin, initial stress is posited for the Old Latin period, after which it gave way to the "Classical" stress pattern. However, fixed initial stress may alternatively be an areal feature postdating Proto-Italic, since the vowel reductions which it is posited to explain are not found before the mid-first millennium BC. Furthermore, the persistence of Proto-Indo-European mobile accent is required in early Proto-Italic for Brent Vine's reformulation of Thurneysen-Havet's law (where pre-tonic *ou > *au) to work.

== Grammar ==
=== Nouns ===
Nouns could have one of three genders: masculine, feminine and neuter. They declined for seven of the eight Proto-Indo-European cases: nominative, vocative, accusative, genitive, dative, ablative and locative. The instrumental case had been lost. Nouns also declined for number in singular and plural. The dual number was no longer distinguished, although a few remnants (like Latin duo, ambō) still preserved some form of the inherited dual inflection.

==== o-stems ====
This class corresponds to the second declension of Latin, basically divided into masculine and neuter nouns. It descends from the Proto-Indo-European thematic declension. Most nouns in this class were masculine or neuter, but there may have been some feminine nouns as well (e.g., names of plants such as Latin "papyrus").

o-stem declension
Case	*agros m. "field"		*jugom n. "yoke"	
Case	Singular	Plural	Singular	Plural
Nominative	*agros < PIE *h₂éǵros	*agrōs < PIE *h₂éǵroes ( *agroi)	*jugom < PIE *yugóm	*jugā < PIE *yugéh₂
Vocative	*agre < *h₂éǵre	*agrōs < *h₂éǵroes ( *agroi)	*jugom < PIE *yugóm	*jugā < PIE *yugéh₂
Accusative	*agrom < *h₂éǵrom	*agrons < *h₂éǵroms	*jugom < PIE *yugóm	*jugā < PIE *yugéh₂
Genitive	*agrosjo < *h₂éǵrosyo *agrī	*agrom < *h₂éǵroHom	*jugosjo < *yugósyo *jugī	*jugom < *yugóHom
Dative	*agrōi < *h₂éǵroey	*agrois < *h₂éǵrobʰos	*jugōi < *yugóey	*jugois < *yugóbʰos
Ablative	*agrōd < *h₂éǵread	*agrois < *h₂éǵrobʰos	*jugōd < *yugéad	*jugois < *yugóbʰos
Locative	*agroi? < *h₂éǵroy *agrei? < *h₂éǵrey	*agrois < *h₂éǵroysu?	*jugoi? < *yugóy *jugei? < *yugéy	*jugois < *yugóysu?

- The nominative singular ending *-os is preserved into Old Latin forms such as sakros ("cursed"). In Sabellic, the o-vowel underwent syncope, producing forms such as the Oscan nominative singular húrz ("enclosure").
- The nominative plural was originally *-ōs for nouns and adjectives, and *-oi for pronominal forms. The *-ōs ending was replaced altogether in Latin in favour of *-oi, whence the classical -ī. In Osco-Umbrian, the reverse happened, where *-oi was replaced with *-ōs, whence Oscan -ús, Umbrian -us.
- The vocative singular ending *-e remains unchanged from PIE in both Latin and Sabellic (e.g. Latin puere, vocative of puer; Umbrian Tefre). However, Latin also shows vocatives in -ī to stems in -ios, such as the form Tatī, which is the vocative of Tatius. According to Weiss, this particular ending might reflect earlier *-ije, which may have already syncopated to *-ī within Proto-Italic. In certain Sabellic and Latin forms, the final *-e underwent analogical restoration, such as in Latin fīlie and Oscan Statie.
- The accusative singular ending *-om is preserved in Old Latin forms such as oino(m) and Sabellic forms such as Oscan húrtúm.
- The accusative plural ending *-ons is reflected in Sabellic by forms such as vitluf ("calves"), with the regular sound change of final *-ns to *-f. In Latin, however, it developed into -ōs.
- The genitive singular in *-ī is of unknown origin, but is found in both Italic and Celtic. It mostly ousted the older inherited genitive in *-osjo in Latin. The older form is found in a few inscriptions, such as popliosio valesiosio on the Lapis Satricanus, likely rendered as Publii Valerii in classical Latin. It is also continued in some pronominal genitives, such as cuius < *kʷojjo-s < PIE *kʷosjo, with *-s added by analogy with the consonant stem genitive in *-os. In Osco-Umbrian, neither ending survives, being replaced with *-eis, the i-stem ending.
- The genitive plural ending *-om is preserved in a select few Old Latin term as well as a few fragments in later Latin, such as the term deum. Latin otherwise replaced the ending with innovative -ōrum on the model of the first-declension genitive plural desinence -ārum. However, in Sabellic, the original ending is preserved more faithfully, as demonstrated by terms such as Umbrian pihaklu ("of the purification rites").
- The dative singular ending *-ōi is continued in a select few extremely archaic Latin words, such as Numasiōi. It remained in widespread usage within Sabellic, where it remains in forms such as húrtúí.
- The ablative singular ending *-ōd is continued in Old Latin by forms such as poplicod and in Sabellic by forms such as Oscan sakaraklúd ("sanctuary").
- The original PIE dative-ablative plural ending was *-obʰos, which is preserved in Venetic louderobos ("to the children"). However, the Old Latin and Sabellic ending -ois instead continues the old PIE instrumental plural ending *-ōys, which may have undergone shortening due to Osthoff's Law. It is possible that the original locative plural ending *-oysu contributed to this development.
- Neuter o-stems also had a dual ending -oi (< *-oyh₁), surviving in some Latin relics like caelum "sky", frēnum "bridle" and rāstrum "rake", whose plurals end in -ī instead of -a.

==== ā-stems ====
This class corresponds to the first declension of Latin. It derives primarily from Proto-Indo-European nouns in *-eh₂-, and contained mostly feminine nouns, and maybe a few masculines, such as names of jobs in Classical Latin, some of them being loanwords from Ancient Greek (e.g., incola, nauta, poeta).

ā-stem declension
Case	*wiā, f. beard	
Case	Singular	Plural
Nominative	*wiā < PIE *wih₁éh₂	*wiās < PIE *wih₁éh₂es
Vocative	*wia < *wih₁éh₂	*wiās < PIE *wih₁éh₂es
Accusative	*wiām < *wih₁ā́m	*wians < *wih₁éh₂m̥s
Genitive	*wiās < *wih₁éh₂s	*wiāzom < PIE *wih₁éh₂soHom < *wih₁éh₂oHom
Dative	*wiāi < *wih₁éh₂ey	*wiais < *wih₁éh₂bʰos
Ablative	*wiād < *wih₁éh₂s	*wiais < *wih₁éh₂bʰos
Locative	*wiāi < *wih₁éh₂i	*wiais < *wih₁éh₂su?

- The long ā-vowel of the nominative singular is continued in Sabellic with regular rounding in word-final position, thereby producing forms such as Oscan -ú. In Latin, however, it underwent shortening for unclear reasons.
- The nominative plural ending -ās is preserved in Sabellic forms such as Oscan aasas ("altars") and Umbrian urtas ("arisen"), though it was replaced in Latin with the innovative ending -ae.
- The long vowel of the accusative singular ending underwent regular shortening prior to final -m in Latin, though it is preserved in Oscan forms such as paam, which is equivalent to Latin quam.
- The genitive singular in -s, still used in Old Latin, went extinct in Classical Latin except in the fixed expression "Pater familias."
- The genitive plural ending was originally a pronominal form, PIE *-eh₂-soHom.
- The dative-ablative plural was analogically remodeled after the ending *-ois of the first declension.

==== Consonant stems ====
This class contained nouns with stems ending in a variety of consonants. They included root nouns, n-stems, r-stems, s-stems and t-stems among others. It corresponds to the third declension of Latin, which also includes the i-stems, originally a distinct class.

Masculine and feminine nouns declined alike, while neuters had different forms in the nominative/accusative/vocative.

Consonant stem declension
Case	*sniks f. "snow"		*kord n. "heart"	
Case	Singular	Plural	Singular	Plural
Nominative-Vocative	*sniks < PIE *snéygʷʰs	*sniɣʷes < PIE *snéygʷʰes	*kord < PIE *ḱr̥d	*kordā < PIE *ḱérdh₂
Accusative	*sniɣʷəm < *snéygʷʰm̥	*sniɣʷəns < *snéygʷʰm̥s	*kord < PIE *ḱr̥d	*kordā < PIE *ḱérdh₂
Genitive	*sniɣʷes < *snigʷʰés *sniɣʷos	*sniɣʷom < *snigʷʰóHom	*kordes < *ḱr̥dés *kordos	*kordom < *ḱr̥dóHom
Dative	*sniɣʷei < *snigʷʰéy	*sniɣʷ(V?)βos < *snigʷʰmós	*kordei < *ḱr̥déy	*kord(V?)βos < *ḱr̥dmós
Ablative	*sniɣʷi < *snigʷʰés (*sniɣʷa?)	*sniɣʷ(V?)βos < *snigʷʰmós	*kordi < *ḱr̥dés (*korde?)	*kord(V?)βos < *ḱr̥dmós
Locative	*sniɣʷi < *snéygʷʰi	*sniɣʷ(V?)βos < *snigʷʰmós	*kordi < *ḱérdi	*kord(V?)βos < *ḱr̥dmós

Nouns in this class often had a somewhat irregular nominative singular form. This created several subtypes, based on the final consonant of the stem.

- For most consonant stem nouns, the ending of the nominative/vocative singular was -s for masculine and feminine nouns. This ending would cause devoicing, delabialisation and/or hardening of the stem-final consonant, as seen in *sniks above. Neuter nouns had no ending.
- n-stems generally had the ending *-ō, with the infix *-on- (or maybe *-en-) in the other cases; e.g., PIt *sermō, sermōnes, in which *-mō derives from PIE *-mō < **-mons. On the other hand, neuters had *-ən in the nom/voc/acc singular, while the stem of the remaining forms is unclear. An example is *kreimən, *kreimənVs, from PIE *kréymn̥, in which -mn̥ is related to **-mons.
- r-stems had *-ēr, alternating with *-(e)r-. The alternation in vowel length was lost in Latin, but is preserved in Oscan.
- s-stems had *-ōs (for masculines and feminines) or *-os (for neuters). This alternated with *-ez- (or maybe *-oz- in some masculine/feminine nouns) in the other forms.
- The r/n-stems were a small group of neuter nouns. These had *-or in the nominative/vocative/accusative singular, but *-(e)n- in the remaining forms.

Other notes:

- The genitive singular had two possible endings. Both are attested side by side in Old Latin, although the ending -es/-is may also be from the i-stems (see below). In Osco-Umbrian, only the i-stem ending -eis is found.
- The Latin masculine nominative plural ending -ēs (with a long vowel) was taken from the i-stems.
- The neuter nominative/vocative/accusative plural originally had short *-a as the ending, or lengthening of the vowel before the final consonant. Already in Italic, this was replaced with the o-stem ending *-ā.
- The dative (and ablative/locative?) plural ending would have originally been added directly to the stem, with no intervening vowel. In Latin, there is an intervening -e- or -i-, while in Osco-Umbrian the ending is replaced altogether. It's not clear what the Proto-Italic situation was.

==== i-stems ====
This class corresponds to the nouns of the Latin third declension that had the genitive plural ending -ium (rather than -um). In Latin, the consonant stems gradually merged with this class. This process continued into the historical era; e.g. in Caesar's time (c. 50 BC) the i-stems still had a distinct accusative plural ending -īs, but this was replaced with the consonant-stem ending -ēs by the time of Augustus (c. AD 1). In Proto-Italic, as in the other Italic languages, i-stems were still very much a distinct type and showed no clear signs of merging.

Masculine and feminine nouns declined alike, while neuters had different forms in the nominative/accusative/vocative.

Endings
Case	*mentis f. "mind"		*mari n. "sea, lake"	
Case	Singular	Plural	Singular	Plural
Nominative-Vocative	*mentis < PIE *méntis	*mentēs < PIE *ménteyes	*mari < PIE *móri	*marjā (*-īā?) < *marī < PIE *mórih₂
Accusative	*mentim < *méntim	*mentins < *méntims	*mari < PIE *móri	*marjā (*-īā?) < *marī < PIE *mórih₂
Genitive	*mənteis < *mn̥téys *məntjes	*məntjom < *mn̥téyoHom	*mareis < *m̥réys *marjes	*marjom < *m̥réyoHom
Dative	*məntēi < *mn̥téyey	*məntiβos < *mn̥tímos	*marēi < *m̥réyey	*mariβos < *m̥rímos
Ablative	*məntīd < *mn̥téys	*məntiβos < *mn̥tímos	*marīd < *m̥réys	*mariβos < *m̥rímos
Locative	*məntei < *mn̥téy	*məntiβos < *mn̥tímos	*marei < *m̥réy	*mariβos < *m̥rímos

- There were apparently two different forms for the genitive singular. The form -eis is found in Osco-Umbrian. However, -es appears in early Latin, while there is no sign of *-eis. This could reflect the consonant-stem ending, but it could also come from *-jes. Compare also *-wos of the u-stems, which is attested in Old Latin, and may represent a parallel formation.
- The original form of the neuter nominative/vocative/accusative plural was *-ī, from PIE *-ih₂. Already in Italic, this was extended by adding the o-stem ending to it, thus culminating into either *-īā or *-jā.

==== u-stems ====
This class corresponds to the fourth declension of Latin. They were historically parallel to the i-stems, and still showed many similar forms, with j/i being replaced with w/u. However, sound changes had made them somewhat different over time.

Endings
Case	*portus m. "harbour, port"		*peku n. "cattle"	
Case	Singular	Plural	Singular	Plural
Nominative-Vocative	*portus < PIE *pértus	*portowes? < PIE *pértewes *portous?	*peku? (*-ū?) < PIE *péḱu	*pekwā (*-ūā?) < *pekū < PIE *péḱuh₂
Accusative	*portum < *pértum	*portuns < *pértums	*peku? (*-ū?) < PIE *péḱu	*pekwā (*-ūā?) < *pekū < PIE *péḱuh₂
Genitive	*portous < *pr̥téws *portwos *portwes	*portwom < *pr̥téwoHom	*pekous < *pḱéws *pekwos *pekwes	*pekwom (-owom?) < *pḱéwoHom
Dative	*portowei < *pr̥téwey	*portuβos < *pr̥túmos	*pekowei < *pḱéwey	*pekuβos < *pḱúmos
Ablative	*portūd < *pr̥téws	*portuβos < *pr̥túmos	*pekūd < *pḱéws	*pekuβos < *pḱúmos
Locative	*portowi? < *pr̥téwi	*portuβos < *pr̥túmos	*pekou? < *pḱéw *pekowi? < *pḱéwi	*pekuβos < *pḱúmos

- The neuter nominative/vocative/accusative singular must have originally been short *-u, but in Latin only long -ū is found. It is unclear what the origin of this could be. It may be a remnant of a dual ending, considering that neuter u-stems were rare, and the few that survived tended to occur in pairs.
- Like the i-stems, the u-stems had two possible types of genitive singular ending, with an unclear distribution. *-ous is found in Oscan, and it is also the origin of the usual Latin ending -ūs. However, the Senatus consultum de Bacchanalibus inscription attests senatvos, and the ending -uis (from *-wes) is also found in a few sources.
- The masculine/feminine nominative/vocative plural is not securely reconstructable. Latin -ūs seems to reflect *-ous, but from PIE *-ewes the form *-owes (Latin *-uis) would be expected. The ending is not attested in Osco-Umbrian or Old Latin, which might have otherwise given conclusive evidence.
- The original form of the neuter nominative/vocative/accusative plural was *-ū. Already in Italic, this was extended by adding the o-stem ending to it, like in the i-stems, thus culminating in either *-wā or *-ūā.

=== Adjectives ===
Adjectives inflected much the same as nouns. Unlike nouns, adjectives did not have inherent genders. Instead, they inflected for all three genders, taking on the same gender-form as the noun they referred to.

Adjectives followed the same inflectional classes of nouns. The largest were the o/ā-stem adjectives (which inflected as o-stems in the masculine and neuter, and as ā-stems in the feminine), and the i-stems. Present active participles of verbs (in *-nts) and the comparative forms of adjectives (in *-jōs) inflected as consonant stems. There were also u-stem adjectives originally, but they had been converted to i-stems by adding i-stem endings onto the existing u-stem, thus giving the nominative singular *-wis.

*alβos, -ā, -om (white)
Case	Masculine	Feminine	Neuter	Masculine (pl.)	Feminine (pl.)	Neuter (pl.)
Nom.	*alβos < PIE *albʰós	*alβā < PIE *albʰéh₂	*alβom < PIE *albʰóm	*alβōs < *albʰóes (*alβoi)	*alβās < *albʰéh₂es	*alβā < *albʰéh₂
Gen.	*alβosjo < *albʰósyo (*alβī)	*alβās < *albʰéh₂s	*alβosjo < *albʰósyo (*alβī)	*alβom < *albʰóHom	*alβāzōm < PIE *albʰéh₂soHom ( < *albʰéh₂oHom)	*alβom < *albʰóHom
Dat.	*alβōi < *albʰóey	*alβāi < *albʰéh₂ey	*alβōi < *albʰóey	*alβois < *albʰóysu	*alβais < *albʰéh₂su	*alβois < *albʰóysu
Acc.	*alβom < *albʰóm	*alβam < *albʰā́m	*alβom < *albʰóm	*alβons < *albʰóms	*alβans < *albʰéh₂m̥s	*alβā < *albʰéh₂
Voc.	*alβe < *albʰé	*alβa < *albʰéh₂	*alβom < *albʰóm	*alβōs < *albʰóes (*alβoi)	*alβās < *albʰéh₂es	*alβā < *albʰéh₂
Abl.	*alβōd < *albʰéad	*alβād < *albʰéh₂s	*alβōd < *albʰéad	*alβois < *albʰóysu	*alβais < *albʰéh₂su	*alβois < *albʰóysu
Loc.	*alβei < *albʰéy	*alβāi < *albʰéh₂i	*alβei < *albʰéy	*alβois < *albʰóysu	*alβais < *albʰéh₂su	*alβois < *albʰóysu

=== Pronouns ===
Declension of Personal Pronouns:

Singular	1st Person	2nd Person	Reflexive
Nominative	*egō < PIE *éǵh₂	*tū < PIE *túh₂	—
Accusative	*mē, *me < *me	*tē, *te < *twé ~ *te	*sē, *se < PIE *swé ~ *se
Genitive	*moi, *mei < *moy	*toi, *tei < *toy, *téwe	*soi, *swei < *soy, *séwe
Dative	*meɣei < *méǵʰye	*teβei < *tébʰye	*seβei < *sébʰye
Ablative	*med < *h₁med	*ted < *twét	*sed < *swét
Possessive	*meos < PIE *mewos? *meyos? < *h₁mós	*towos < PIE *tewos < *twos	*sowos < PIE *sewós < *swós
Plural	1st Person	2nd Person	Reflexive
Nominative	*nōs < *nos	*wōs < *wos	—
Accusative	*nōs < *nos	*wōs < *wos	*sē, *se
Genitive	*nosterom? < *n̥s(er)o-?	*westerom? < *yus(er)o-?	*soi, *swei
Dative	*nōβei < *n̥smey	*wōβei < *usmey	*seβei
Ablative	*nōβei < *n̥smey	*wōβei < *usmey	*sed
Possessive	*nosteros < *nsteros?	*westeros < *usteros?	*sowos

Note: For the third person pronoun, Proto-Italic *is would have been used.

Declension of Relative Pronouns:

Singular	Masculine	Neuter	Feminine
Nominative	*kʷoi < PIE *kʷós?*kʷó?	*kʷod < PIE *kʷód	*kʷāi < PIE *kʷéh₂
Accusative	*kʷoi < PIE *kʷós?*kʷó?	*kʷod < PIE *kʷód	*kʷāi < PIE *kʷéh₂
Genitive	*kʷojjos < *kʷósyo		
Dative	*kʷojjei, *kʷozmoi < *kʷósmey		
Ablative	*kʷōd < *kʷósmōd?		*kʷād < ?
Locative	? < *kʷósmi	? < *kʷósmi	?
Plural	Masculine	Neuter	Feminine
Nominative	*kʷoi, *kʷōs	*kʷā, *kʷai	*kʷās
Accusative	*kʷons	*kʷā, *kʷai	*kʷāns
Genitive	*kʷozom		*kʷazom
Dative	*kʷois		
Ablative	*kʷois		
Locative	*kʷois		

Declension of Interrogative Pronouns:

Singular	Masculine	Feminine	Neuter
Nominative	*kʷis < PIE *kʷís		*kʷid < PIE *kʷíd
Accusative	*kʷim < *kʷím		*kʷid < PIE *kʷíd
Genitive	*kʷejjos < *kʷésyo		
Dative	*kʷejjei, *kʷezmoi < *kʷésmey		
Ablative	*kʷōd < *kʷéd?	*kʷād < *kʷéd?	*kʷōd < *kʷéd?
Locative	? < *kʷésmi	? < *kʷésmi	? < *kʷésmi
Plural	Masculine	Feminine	Neuter
Nominative	*kʷēs < *kʷéyes		*kʷī, *kʷia < *kʷíh₂
Accusative	*kʷins < *kʷíms		*kʷī, *kʷia < *kʷíh₂
Genitive	*kʷejzom?, *kʷozom? < *kʷéysom		
Dative	*kʷiβos < kʷeybʰ-		
Ablative	*kʷiβos < kʷeybʰ-		
Locative	*kʷiβos < kʷeybʰ-		

Declension of Demonstrative Pronouns:

*is "this, that"

Singular	Masculine	Neuter	Feminine
Nominative	*is < PIE *ís	*id < PIE *íd	*ejā < PIE *íh₂
Accusative	*im < *ím	*id < PIE *íd	*ejām < *íh₂m
Genitive	*ejjos < *ésyo		
Dative	*ejjei, *esmoi < *ésyeh₂ey, *ésmey		
Ablative	*ejōd < *ésmod		*ejād < *ésyo
Locative	? < *ésmi	? < *ésmi	?
Plural	Masculine	Neuter	Feminine
Nominative	*ejōs, *ejoi < *éyes	*ejā < *íh₂	*ejās < *íh₂es
Accusative	*ejons < *íns	*ejā < *íh₂	*ejans < *íh₂ms
Genitive	*ejozom < *éysom		*ejazom < *éysoHom
Dative	*ejois < *éymos?		*ejais < *íh₂mos?
Ablative	*ejois < *éymos?		*ejais < *íh₂mos?
Locative	? < *éysu	? < *éysu	? < *íh₂su

=== Numbers ===
Number	PIt	PIE
One (1) [I]	*oinos	*h₁óynos
Two (2) [II]	*duō	*dwóh₁
Three (3) [III]	*trejes > *trēs	*tréyes
Four (4) [IV]	*kʷettwōr	*kʷetwṓr (gen. plur.) < *kʷetwóres
Five (5) [V]	*kʷenkʷe	*pénkʷe
Six (6) [VI]	*seks	*swéḱs
Seven (7) [VII]	*septem	*septḿ̥
Eight (8) [VIII]	*oktō	*oḱtṓw
Nine (9) [IX]	*nowem	*h₁néwn̥
Ten (10) [X]	*dekem	*déḱm̥t

=== Verbs ===
To mark the imperfect, a new past indicative suffix of *-βā- was created in the Italic languages. This morpheme is continued in Latin terms such as portābant and possibly by the Oscan form fufans ("they were"). It is also potentially present in the form profafạ-, which appears on a broken inscription in the Vestinian language. The new suffix was itself perhaps from the combination of the root *bʰuH- ("to be") and the same *ā-extension found in the imperfect forms of the verb sum (i.e. erās).

During the transition from Proto-Indo-European to Latin and Sabellic, the subjunctive and optative were merged, resulting in the general Italic subjunctive. However, the linguist Frederick Kortlandt disputes whether the optative had been lost by the time of Proto-Italic, noting that the continuation of optative forms may be attested in terms such as Latin faxīm, which perhaps continues the Proto-Indo-European athematic optative infix *-yéh₁-. It is possible that the original Proto-Indo-European optative forms the basis for the mood known in Latin as the subjunctive, whereas the original Proto-Indo-European subjunctive paradigm gave rise to the standard Latin future. The Italic languages innovated an imperfect subjunctive marker *-sē-, as reflected by Paelignian upsaseter, Oscan patensíns, and the Latin panderent. It is, however, unattested in Venetic or Umbrian. In Latin, the suffix underwent rhotacism, thereby surfacing as -rē- (e.g. amārēs), though the form essēs perhaps preserves the original sigmatic nature of the morpheme.

Proto-Italic may have developed a type of sigmatic future formation, which is itself possibly reflected in the Old Latin and Sabellic sigmatic futures. For instance, compare the Old Latin sigmatic future form faxō to the standard Classical Latin non-sigmatic future faciam. The ultimate source of the sigmatic forms is unclear. The Old Latin sigmatic future has been related to a Proto-Indo-European s-desiderative suffix. There is semantic precedent in other Indo-European languages for a shift from a desiderative to a future meaning—compare the Ancient Greek s-future, such as in the Ancient Greek future form δήξομαι ("dḗxomai"), which may derive from the desiderative suffix *-(h₁)seti. The sigmatic future indicative may have derived from the subjunctive of a Proto-Indo-European sigmatic aorist, and the Latin sigmatic aorist subjunctive may have derived from the optative of a Proto-Indo-European sigmatic aorist. If this theory is accepted, then the first sigmatic forms may have emerged prior to the aorist-perfect merger in Latin.

During the transition from Proto-Indo-European into the Sabellic and Latino-Faliscan languages, the aorist and perfect merged into a single tense, referred to as the perfect in Latin and Sabellic grammar. In Latin and Sabellic, the perfect tense of a verb consists of a unique perfect stem to which the inflectional endings are affixed. To form these perfect stems, both Italic branches often reused original aorist or perfect stems. In addition, there were some new innovations within the perfective aspect, with the -v- perfect (in Latin amō, amāvī) and the -u- perfect (moneō, monuī) being later innovations, for example. Latin more typically preserved original sigmatic aorists, such as in the case of dīx-, whereas Sabellic often preserved original root aorists. However, neither Italic branch exclusively preserved one type of aorist or perfect stem: The Latin perfect stem dīx- continues the Proto-Indo-European s-aorist *dḗyḱst, but the perfect stem peper- continues the Proto-Indo-European reduplicated perfect *pepórh₃e, and the perfect stem iēc- continues the full-grade k-aorist *(H)yéh₁kt. Moreover, the chosen stems in the two Italic branches are usually opposite: Where Latin continues an original perfect form, Sabellic typically preserves an aorist, and vice versa. According to Rix, if a verb stem is present in both the Latino-Faliscan and Sabellic branches, the present stem is identical in 90% of cases, but the perfect in only 50% of cases.

Due to the vast array of morphological distinctions between the perfect in Sabellic and Latino-Faliscan, it is generally held in the field of Italic linguistics that the aorist-perfect merger was completed independently in the Italic daughter languages, thereby preventing the branches from inheriting one unified system common to Proto-Italic. Furthermore, since Latino-Faliscan and Sabellic consistently continue opposite perfect and aorist stems, Meiser argues that most Proto-Italic verbs likely had both perfect and aorist forms. Meiser concludes that—in Proto-Italic—these stems may not have differed significantly in meaning, and thus, a given form was selected for preservation in the daughter languages based on morphology rather than meaning. However, the linguist Reuben Pitts proposes that Old Latin, Faliscan, and the Sabellic languages shared far more morphological similarities than linguists such as Meiser suggest. If these theories are accepted, then this may indicate a later date for the divergences between the Sabellic and Latino-Faliscan perfect systems.

== Post-Italic developments ==
Further changes occurred during the evolution of individual Italic languages. This section gives an overview of the most notable changes. For complete lists, see History of Latin and other articles relating to the individual languages.

- *x debuccalises to [h]. *ɣ similarly becomes [ɦ] between vowels, but remains elsewhere. This change possibly took place within the Proto-Italic period. The result, whether [h] or [ɦ], was written h in all Italic languages. Initial *xl, *xr are reflected (in Latin at least) as gl, gr
- *θ(e)r, *ð(e)r > *f(e)r, *β(e)r in all but Venetic. Compare Venetic louder-obos to Latin līber, Faliscan loifir-ta, Oscan lúvfreis.
- *β, *ð> Latin b, d. In Osco-Umbrian the result is f (probably voiced) for both. In Faliscan, *β remains a fricative.
- *ɣʷ > *gʷ in Latin, which then develops as below. > f in Osco-Umbrian.
- *dw > b in classical Latin, although still retained in the archaic (see Duenos inscription)
- *kʷ, *gʷ > p, b in Osco-Umbrian. They are retained in Latino-Faliscan and Venetic. In Latin, *gʷ > v [w] except after *n.
- *z > r in Classical Latin and Umbrian, but not in Old Latin or Oscan.
- Final -ā (fem. sg. nom., neut. pl. nom./acc.) > [oː] in Osco-Umbrian, (Note: Written o in the Latin alphabet, but ú in the native Oscan alphabet, and u or sometimes a in the native Umbrian alphabet. See Sihler 1995:266.) but becomes short -a in Latin.
- Final *-ns (acc. pl. of various noun classes), *-nts (masc. nom. sg. of participles), and *-nt (neut. nom./acc. sg. of participles) developed in complex ways:

PItal	Pre-O-U	Oscan	Umbrian	Pre-Latin	Latin
*-ns	*-ns	-ss	-f	*-ns	-s
*-nts	*-ns	-ss	-f	*-nts	-ns
*-nt	*-nts	-ns	—	*-nts	-ns

- Latin vowel reduction, during the Old Latin period. This merged many of the unstressed short vowels; most dramatically, all short vowels merged (usually to /i/) in open medial syllables. Furthermore, all diphthongs became pure vowels except for *ai and *au (and occasionally *oi) in initial syllables.

== See also ==
- History of Latin
- Italo-Celtic
