= Sabine language =

Ancient Italic language

Sabine
- lingua Sabina
- Pronunciation: [saˈbiːna]
- Native to: Sabina (Sabinum)
- Region: Central Italy
- Ethnicity: Sabines
- Era: 1st millennium BC – 1st millennium AD
- Language family: Indo-European: Italic; Osco-Umbrian; Umbrian?; Sabine
- Writing system: Latin alphabet

Language codes
- ISO 639-3: sbv
- Glottolog: sabi1245
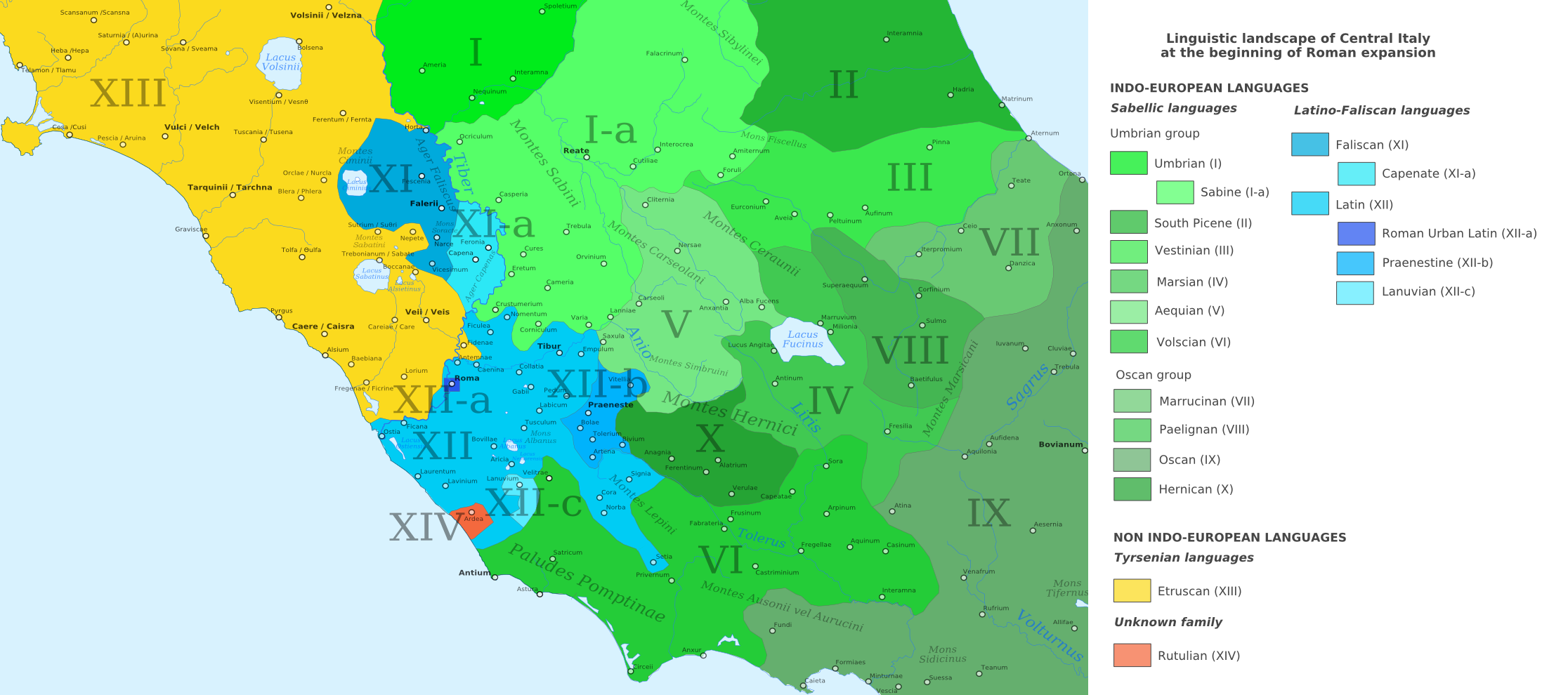
- The linguistic landscape of Central Italy at the beginning of Roman expansion

The Sabine language is an extinct Osco-Umbrian language. There is little record of it; however, there are some glosses by ancient commentators, and one or two inscriptions have been tentatively identified as Sabine. There are also personal names in use on Latin inscriptions from the Sabine country, but these are given in Latin form. Robert Seymour Conway, in his Italic Dialects, gives approximately 100 words which vary from being well-attested as Sabine to being possibly of Sabine origin. In addition to these he cites place names derived from the Sabine, sometimes giving attempts at reconstructions of the Sabine form. Based on all the evidence, Glottolog classifies it as an Old Sabellic dialect alongside South Picene and Pre-Samnite.
