= Benjamin Fortson =

Benjamin Fortson may refer to:

- Benjamin W. Fortson Jr. (1904–1979), former Secretary of State of Georgia
- Benjamin W. Fortson IV, American linguist
