= Aequian language =

Extinct Italic language northeast of Rome

Aequian
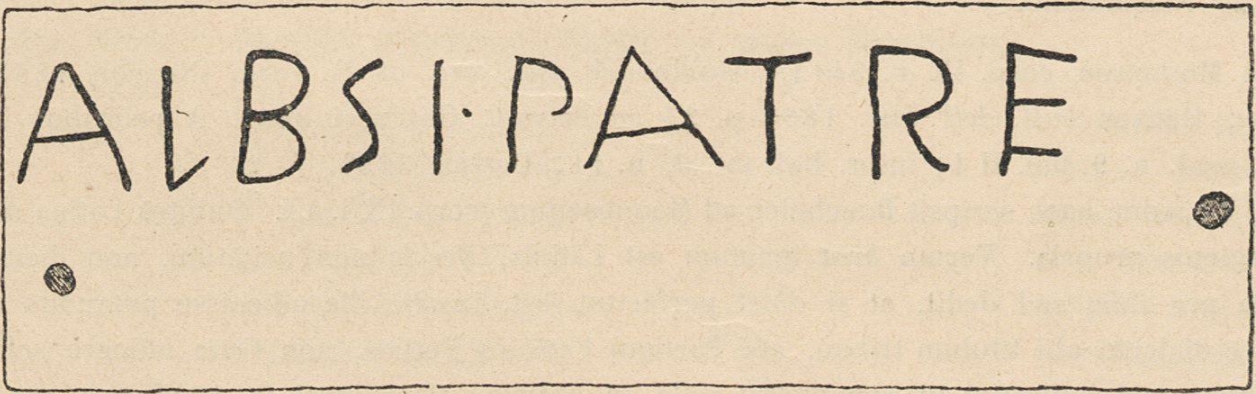
- Alba Fucens inscription
- Native to: Aequian country
- Region: Latium, east-central Italy
- Ethnicity: Aequi
- Era: attested 5th to 3rd century BC
- Language family: Indo-European: Italic; Osco-Umbrian?; Umbrian?; Aequian

Language codes
- ISO 639-3: xae
- Glottolog: aequ1239
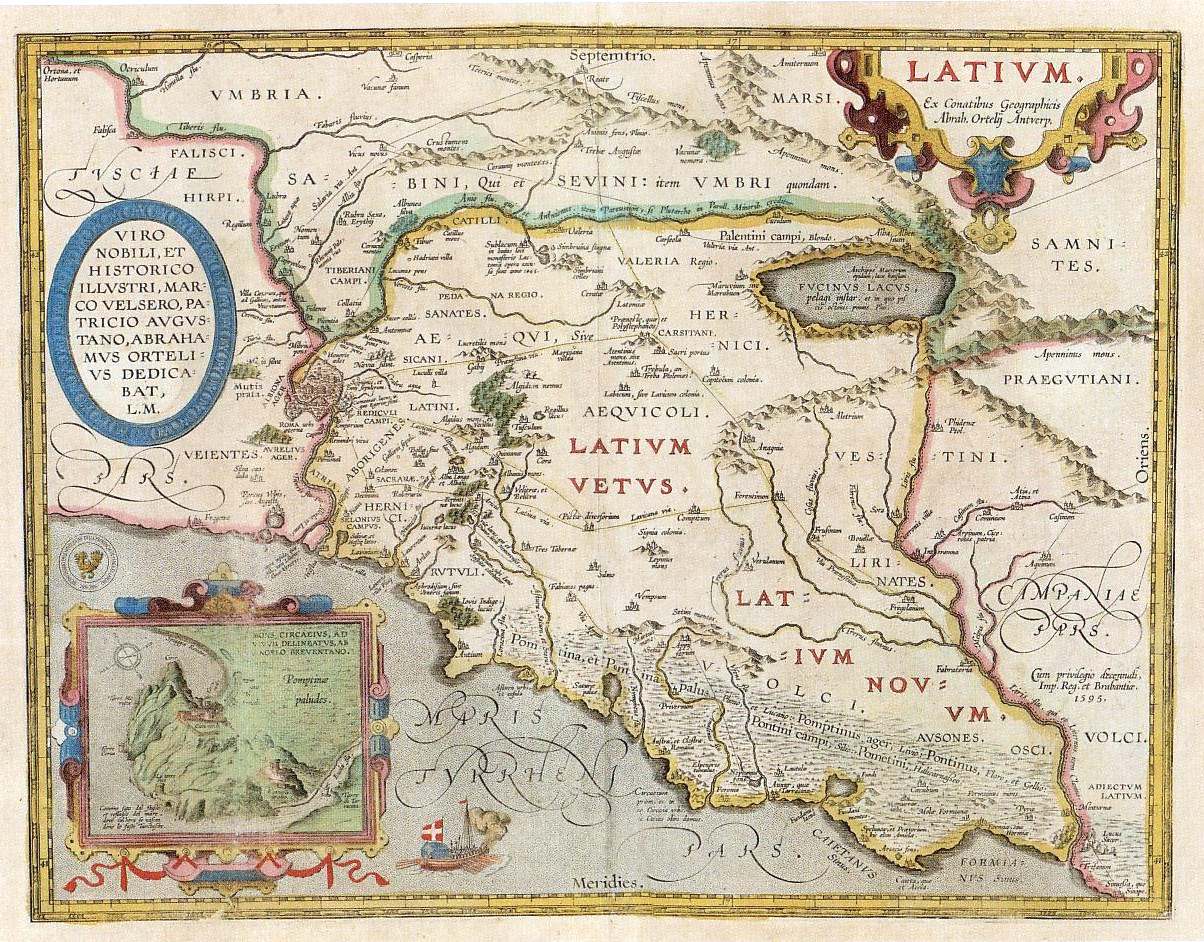
- Abraham Ortelius's map of ancient Latium, published in 1595

Aequian is an extinct Italic language presumed spoken by the people the Romans termed Aequi and Aequicoli living in the Alban Hills of northeast Latium and the central Apennines east of them during the early and middle Roman Republic; that is, approximately from the 5th to the 3rd century BC, when they were defeated by the armies of Rome and were subsequently Romanized. As the area was heavily colonized by Latin speakers from Rome, most of the inscriptions from there are in Latin. Two undated inscriptions appear to be in a different dialect, termed Aequian by the scholars with the presumption that in fact they represent the language of the entire pre-Roman tribe. Not enough text survives to deduce any more than that it belonged to the Italic branch of the Indo-European language family.

== Corpus ==
Aequian is scantily documented by two inscriptions. Conway's publication of Italic inscriptions adds a gloss, several place names and several dozen personal names, but it does not distinguish which of these are certainly endonyms and which are Latin exonyms in use by the Latin-speaking population.

The inscription of Alba Fucens is a bronze plate inscribed with ALBSI PATRE. This text has since been lost; its contents survive only in a drawing. Conway reconstructs the first word as *albe(n)si, a dative case. Baldi translates the text into Latin as Albano patri, two datives, and into English as "To the (god named) Alban Father." According to Conway, the alphabet itself provides no indication as to the date of the text, though he surmises that it is relatively young.

The second document is the Inscription of Cliternia (Capradosso) in Petrella Salto, an inscribed stone in a spring dissociated from context by nature (it rolled down a hill). The text is:

VIA INFERIOR | PRIVATAST | T VMBRENI C F |
PRECARIO | ITVR | PECVS PLOSTRV | NIQVIS AGAT

It is a notice stating that the road is private, passage by permission of Titus Umbrenus, son of Gaius, but beasts of burden are forbidden.

== Bibliography ==
- Baldi, Philip (2002). The Foundations of Latin. Trends in Linguistics: Studies and Monographs. Berlin: Mouton de Gruyter.
- Conway, Robert Seymour (1897). The Italic Dialects. Cambridge: Cambridge University Press.
- Ernout, Alfred (2009) [1916]. Recueil de Textes Latins Archaïques (in French). Internet Archive.
- Stuart-Smith, Jane (2004-06-17). Phonetics and Philology: Sound Change in Italic (1 ed.). Oxford University Press. doi:10.1093/acprof:oso/9780199257737.001.0001. ISBN 978-0-19-925773-7.
