= Osco-Umbrian languages =

Group of Italic languages

Osco-Umbrian
- Sabellic, Sabellian
- Geographic distribution: Ancient south and central Italy
- Extinct: 1st millennium BC-1st millennium AD
- Linguistic classification: Indo-European: Italic; Osco-Umbrian
- Early forms: Proto-Indo-European: Proto-Italic
- Subdivisions: Oscan †; Umbrian †; Volscian †; Sabine †; South Picene †; Marsian †; Paeligni †; Hernican †; Marrucinian †; Pre-Samnite †

Language codes
- Glottolog: sabe1249
- Ethnolinguistic map of Italy in the Iron Age, before the Roman expansion and conquest of Italy

The Osco-Umbrian, Sabellic or Sabellian languages are an extinct group of Italic languages, the Indo-European languages that were spoken in central and southern Italy by the Osco-Umbrians before being replaced by Latin, as the power of ancient Rome expanded. Their written attestations developed from the middle of the 1st millennium BC to the early centuries of the 1st millennium AD. There is one text of about 4,000 words in Umbrian, but otherwise the languages are known almost exclusively from inscriptions, principally of Oscan and Umbrian, but there are also some Osco-Umbrian loanwords in Latin. Besides the two major branches of Oscan and Umbrian (and their dialects), South Picene may represent a third branch of Sabellic. The whole linguistic Sabellic area, however, might be considered a dialect continuum. Paucity of evidence from most of the "minor dialects" contributes to the difficulty of making these determinations.

== Relationship with the Italic languages ==
Following an original theory by Antoine Meillet, the Osco-Umbrian languages were traditionally considered a branch of the Italic languages, a language family that grouped Latin and Faliscan together with several other related languages. This unitary scheme was criticized by, among others, Alois Walde, Vittore Pisani and Giacomo Devoto, who proposed a classification of the Italic languages into two distinct Indo-European branches. This view gained some acceptance in the second half of the 20th century, although the exact processes of formation and penetration into Italy remains the object of research. Proponents such as Rix later rejected the idea, and the unitary theory (proposing the descent of all Italic languages from a unique common ancestor) remains dominant. In any case, it is plausible that the spread of all those languages took place through progressive inflows of Indo-European populations of eastern origin, with Osci and Umbri reaching the Italian peninsula after Latins and Falisci, but before Iapygians such as the Messapians.

== Historical, social and cultural aspects ==
The two main branches of the Sabellic languages, spoken in the heart of the Italian peninsula, are Oscan in the south and Umbrian to the north of Oscan. Included among the Sabellic languages are: Volscian, Sabine, South Picene, Marsian, Paeligni, Hernican, Marrucinian and Pre-Samnite.

Aequian and Vestinian have traditionally been ascribed to either the Oscan group or the Umbrian group. However, they are all poorly attested, and such a division is not supported by evidence. It appears that they may have formed part of a dialect continuum, with Umbrian in the north, Oscan in the south and the 'Sabellic' languages in between (see next section) having features of both.

However, there were also colonies that spoke Oscan, scattered throughout southern Italy and Sicily. Oscan was the language of the Samnite tribes, powerful enemies of the Romans, who took years to subdue them (the Samnite wars took place from 370 BC to 290 BC).

These languages are known from a few hundred inscriptions dating from between 400 BC and the 1st century AD. In Pompeii there are numerous Oscan inscriptions, such as dedications in public buildings and signs.

Umbrian began a process of decline when the Umbrians were subdued by the Romans and the process of Romanisation led to its demise. Of all the Osco-Umbrian languages, it is the one that is the best known, mainly because of the Iguvine Tablets.

== Distribution ==
These languages were spoken in Samnium and in Campania, partly in Apulia, Lucania and Bruttium, as well as by the Mamertines in the Sicilian colony of Messana (Messina).

== Past usage ==
Sabellic was originally the collective ethnonym of the Italic people who inhabited central and southern Italy at the time of Roman expansion. The name was later used by Theodor Mommsen in his Unteritalische Dialekte to describe the pre-Roman dialects of Central Italy that were neither Oscan nor Umbrian.

The term is currently used for the Osco-Umbrian languages as a whole. The word "Sabellic" was once applied to all such minor languages, Osco-Umbrian or not. North Picene was included, even though it remains unclear whether it is related.

== Classification ==
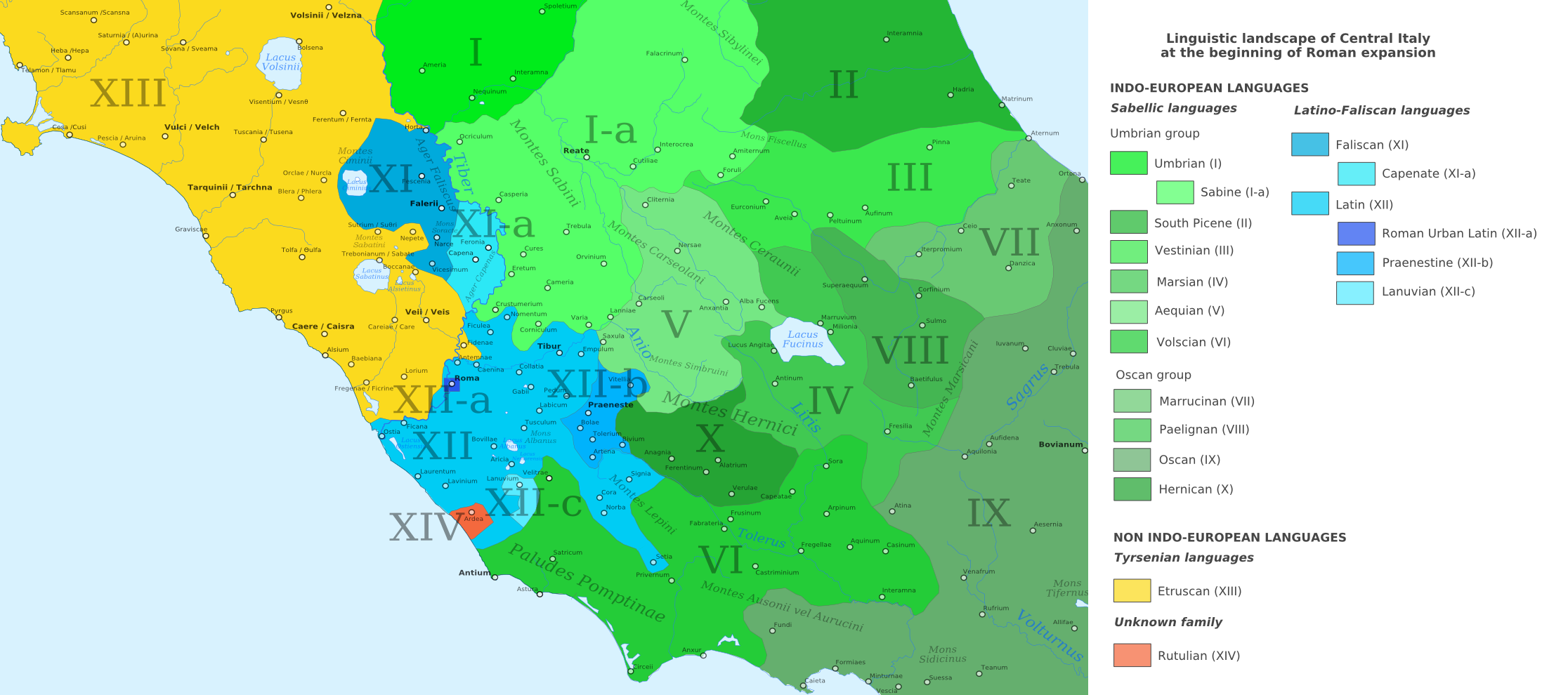
Linguistic landscape of Central Italy at the beginning of Roman expansion

The Osco-Umbrian languages or dialects of which testimony is preserved are:

- Oscan, with spoken languages in the southern central region of the Italian peninsula, which includes:
  - Oscan is the best documented language of the group, along with other varieties that are poorly known and considered related to Oscan:
    - Marrucinian
    - Paeligni
- Umbrian, with languages spoken in the northern central region of the peninsula.
  - Umbrian
  - Marsian
  - Sabine
  - Volscian
  - Hernican
- Picene-Pre-Samnite
  - South Picene
  - Pre-Samnite, a language documented in the south, but which seems to contain characteristics closer to South Picene than to Oscan.
- Unknown
  - Aequian
  - Vestinian (Most likely Oscan, like their neighbors Paeligni and Marrucini, whom the Vestini were closely connected with.)

Little-documented variants collectively known as "Sabellic dialects" are ascribed without much evidence to the two main groups. Some authors doubt such traditional classification, placing, for example, Aequian and Vestinian in opposite branches, instead of grouping them together.

== Linguistic description ==
The Osco-Umbrian languages were fusional inflected languages with 7 different morphological cases in the singular of substantives, similar to those of Latin.

=== Differences from Latin ===
Although the Osco-Umbrian languages are far more poorly attested than Latin, a corpus of a few thousand words' worth of inscriptions has allowed linguists to deduce some cladistic innovations and retentions. For example, while Proto-Indo-European aspirates appear as b, d and h/g between vowels in Latin (medius < *medʰyos), the aspirates all appear in Sabellic as f (Oscan mefiai < *medʰyos). In addition, while Latin retained the Proto-Indo-European labiovelar series ("Q-Italic"), the Osco-Umbrian languages merged them with the labials ("P-Italic"): Latin quattuor, Oscan petora both 'four'.

== See also ==
- Italic peoples
