= Siculian =

Extinct Indo-European language from Sicily

- Sicel
- Region: Sicily
- Ethnicity: Sicels
- Era: attested late 6th century to 4th century BCE
- Language family: Indo-European: Italic (?); Siculian
- Writing system: Greek alphabet

Language codes
- ISO 639-3: scx
- Glottolog: sicu1234
- Ethnolinguistic map of Italy in the Iron Age, before the Roman expansion and conquest of Italy

Siculian (or Sicel) is an extinct Indo-European language spoken in central and eastern Sicily by the Sicels. It is attested in fewer than thirty inscriptions in eastern Sicily from the late 6th century to 4th century BCE, and in around twenty-five glosses from ancient writers.

== Classification ==
Ancient sources state that Siculians entered Sicily from the Italian Peninsula either around the 13th century or the middle of the 11th century BCE (or in two waves), driving the prior inhabitants, the Sicanians and Elymians, to the west of the island.

Due to its limited attestation, it is difficult to determine much about this language beyond that it was Indo-European. The prevalent modern view is that Siculian was an Italic language, although the scarcity of sources and the difficulties in interpreting inscriptions and glosses make it impossible to come to a definitive conclusion.

Some inscriptions may reveal Italic elements, such as geped ('had'), which is comparable to the Oscan hipid; dedaxed ('made' ?), perhaps a reduplicated k-extended form of the root *dʰeh₁- similar to Volscian fhe:fhaked and Oscan fefacid; and the female name Kup(a)ra, which evokes the Sabellic *kupro- ('good').

If Siculian is indeed classified as Italic, it would diverge from all its relatives in showing voiced reflexes of the Proto-Indo-European voiced aspirates in initial position, in contrast to the sound changes f < *dʰ / *bʰ and h- < *gʰ / *ǵʰ, attested in Sabellic, Latin and Venetic.

== Attestations ==
They used the Greek alphabet, along with a native one based upon Western Greek scripts, probably the Euboic-Chalkidic version. According to scholar Markus Hartmann, "of the fewer than thirty inscriptions in total, only six appear to be at least in part intelligible and to be Siculian (i.e., most certainly neither Greek nor belonging to some other Italic or pre-Italic language)."

ΝΕΝΔΑΣ Π̣Υ̣[----]Σ ΤΕΒΕΓ ΠΡΑΑΡΕΙ ΕΝ ΒΟ[.]ΡΕΝΑΙ ϜΙΔΕ ΠΑΓΟΣΤΙΚΕ ΑΙΤΕ[--]ΛΥΒΕ
nendas ˌ puṛẹṇọṣ ˌ tebeg ˌ praarei ˌ en ˌ bo?renai ˌ vide ˌ pagostike ˌ aite?ṇ?ụbe.

— Stele from Sciri Sottano (late 6th – early 5th century BCE)

tamuraabesakedqoiaves ˌ eurumakes ˌ agepipokedḷutimbe levopomanatesemaidarnakei- buṛeitaṃomịaetiurela

— Amphora from Montagna di Marzo (late 6th – early 5th century BCE)

ΙΑΜ ΑΚΑΡΑΜ ΕΠΟΠΑΣ ΚΑΑΓΙΙΕΣ ΓΕΠΕΔ ΤΟΥΤΟ FΕΡΕΓΑΙ ΕΣΗΕΙΚΑΔ[.] ΑΛΑ
iamˌakaramˌe?p??asˌkaag?esˌgẹpẹḍ2te?toˌveregai- es? ˌ eka ˌ doara[ịẹạḍ]

— Block of sandstone from Mendolito (late 6th century BCE)

nunus ˌ teṇti ˌ mím ˌ arustainam ˌ íemitom ˌ esti ˌ durom ˌ nanepos ˌ durom ˌ íemitom ˌ esti ˌ velíom ˌ ned ˌ emponitantom ˌ eredes ˌ vịino ˌ brtome

— Guttus (or askos) from Centorbi (early 5th century BCE)

Some inscriptions, written in Sicilian Doric Greek and displaying lexical items that appear to match Latin, such as lítra (comparable to Latin lībra 'pound') and kúbiton (paralleling Latin cubitum 'elbow'), are also suspected to be of Siculian origin.

== Bibliography ==
- Agostiniani, Luciano (1992). "Les parlers indigènes de la Sicile prégrecque". Lalies. 11: 125–157. ISSN 0750-9170.
- de Simone, Carlo (1999). "L'epigrafia sicana e sicula". Annali della Scuola Normale Superiore di Pisa: 499–507. ISSN 0392-095X.
- de Simone, Carlo (2006). "Ancora su Siculo e Sicano". In Michelini, Chiara (ed.). Guerra e pace in Sicilia e nel Mediterraneo antico (VIII−III sec. a.C.). Vol. 2. Pisa: Scuola Normale Superiore. pp. 689–692. ISBN 978-8876422102.
- Hartmann, Markus (2017). "Siculian". In Klein, Jared; Joseph, Brian; Fritz, Matthias (eds.). Handbook of Comparative and Historical Indo-European Linguistics. Vol. 3. Berlin: Walter de Gruyter. pp. 1854–1857. doi:10.1515/9783110542431-026. ISBN 978-3-11-054243-1. S2CID 242076323.
- Palmer, Leonard Robert (1988). The Latin Language. Norman, Oklahoma: University of Oklahoma Press. ISBN 978-0-8061-2136-9.
- Tribulato, Olga (2012). Language and Linguistic Contact in Ancient Sicily. Cambridge, England: Cambridge University Press. ISBN 978-1-139-85193-0.
- Weiss, Michael (2022). "Italic". In Olander, Thomas (ed.). The Indo-European Language Family. Cambridge University Press. ISBN 978-1-108-49979-8.
