= Paelignian language =

Oscan language

Paelignian
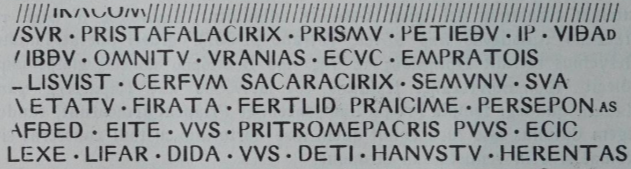
- The Herentas inscription, a text in the Paelignian language
- Native to: Samnium, Campania, Lucania, Calabria and Abruzzo
- Region: south and south-central Italy
- Extinct: 1st century BC
- Language family: Indo-European: Italic; Osco-Umbrian; Oscan; Paelignian
- Writing system: Latin alphabet

Language codes
- ISO 639-3: pgn
- Glottolog: pael1234

Paelignian is an extinct Oscan language formerly spoken by the Paeligni.

== Documentation ==
The Paelignian language is known from around sixty inscriptions dating to the 2nd and 1st centuries BCE, most of which come from Superaequum, Corfinium, and Sulmo. The majority of Paelignian inscriptions are short, with the longest one only containing thirty-six words. One feature of Paelignian is the use of postpositions, as in Vestine Poimunie-n, "in templo Pomonali"; pritrom-e, i.e. in proximum, "on to what lies before you". Others are the sibilation of consonantal i and the assibilation of -di- to some sound like that of English j (denoted by l- in the local variety of Latin alphabet), as in vidadu, "viamdö," i.e. "ad-viam"; Musesa = Lat. Mussedia; and the possible loss of d (in pronunciation) in the ablative, as in aetatu firata fertlid (i.e. aetate fertili finita).

== Classification ==
Paelignian may showcases evidence of medial vowel weakening: The form hospus, which has been compared with hospes ("guest, foreigner"), may have developed from earlier *hostipots, and the term hanustu—which has been connected with Latin honestus ("honorable")—might reflect a pre-form *hanostā. If the etymology of the latter form is accepted, then it would that—unlike Oscan—vowels in Paelignian underwent weakening when not adjacent to a labial. However, the etymology of both terms is uncertain: hospus, for instance, might have been leveled from a hypothetical genitive singular form itself from *-pot-s, which would have undergone weakening of the vowel in a medial syllable. Likewise, the connection between hanustu and Latin honestus is doubtful on account of the oscillation between the o and a vocalism.

The name Paeligni may belong to the NO-class of ethnica (see Marrucini), but the difference that it has no vowel before the suffix suggests that it may rather be parallel with the suffix of Latin privignus. If it has any connection with Latin paelex, "concubine", it is conceivable that it meant “halfbreeds” and was a name coined in contempt by the conquering Sabines, who turned the touta marouca into the community of the Marrucini. But, when unsupported by direct evidence, even the most tempting etymology is an unsafe guide. (Note: For the history of the Paeligni after 90 BC see the references given in C.I.L. ix. 290 (Sulmona, esp. Ovid, e.g. Fasti, iv. 79, Anior. ii. 16; Florus ii. 9; Julius Caesar Commentarii de Bello Civili i. 15) and 296 (Corfinium, e.g. Diodorus Siculus xxxvii. 2, 4, Caes., BC, i. 15).)

Paelignian and this group of inscriptions generally form the most important link in the chain of the Italic dialects, as without them the transition from Oscan to Umbrian would be completely lost. The unique collection of inscriptions and antiquities of Pentima and the museum at Sulmona were both created by Professor Antonio de Nino, whose devotion to the antiquities of his native district rescued every single Paelignian monument that survives.

== Dialects ==
However, the term aetatu exists in contrast the equivalent form aetate found in another Paelignian inscription, perhaps indicating that these texts represent distinct varieties of the language. Various explanations have been offered to explain this discrepancy: the variation aetatu may reflect an archaism, or perhaps a hypercorrection intentionally utilized to distinguish the Paelignian text from Latin writings, which itself may have been motivated by potential anti-Roman sentiments. The epitaph from which the aforementioned phrase is taken was found in Corfinio, the ancient Corfinium, and the perfect style of the Latin alphabet in which it is written shows that it cannot well be earlier than the last century BC: Eite uus pritrome pacris, puus ecic lexe lifar, Latin: ite vos porro pacati (cum bona pace), qui hoc scriptum [hbar, 3rd declination neut.] legistis. The form lexe (2nd plural perfect indicative) is closely parallel to the inflection of the same person in Sanskrit and of quite unique linguistic interest.
