= Italic languages =

Branch of the Indo-European language family

Italic
- Latino-Sabine, Italic–Venetic
- Geographic distribution: Originally the Italian Peninsula and parts of modern-day Austria and Switzerland, today worldwide
- Ethnicity: Originally the Italic peoples
- Native speakers: c. 900 million (Romance languages)
- Linguistic classification: Indo-European: Italo-Celtic?; Italic
- Proto-language: Proto-Italic
- Subdivisions: Latino-Faliscan (including Romance); †Belgic?; †Lusitanian?; †Sabellian; †Siculian?; †Venetic?

Language codes
- ISO 639-5: itc
- Glottolog: ital1284
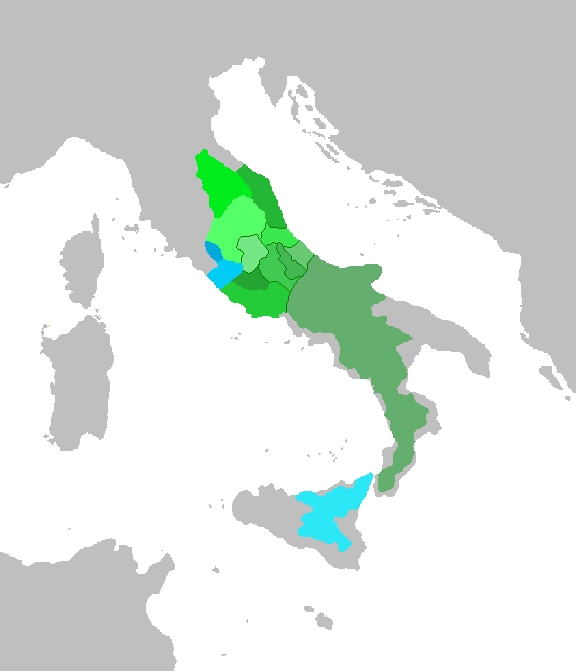
- Distribution of the Italic languages on the Italian Peninsula in the first millennium BC

The Italic languages form a branch of the Indo-European language family, whose earliest known members were spoken on the Italian Peninsula in the first millennium BC. The most important of the ancient Italic languages was Latin, the official language of ancient Rome, which conquered the other Italic peoples before the common era. The other Italic languages became extinct in the first centuries AD as their speakers were assimilated into the Roman Empire and shifted to some form of Latin. Between the third and eighth centuries AD, Vulgar Latin (perhaps influenced by substrata from the other Italic languages, and definitely by non-Italic languages) diversified into the Romance languages, which are the only Italic languages natively spoken today, while Literary Latin also survived.

Besides Latin, the known ancient Italic languages are Faliscan (the closest to Latin), Umbrian and Oscan (or Osco-Umbrian), and South Picene. Other Indo-European languages once spoken in the peninsula whose inclusion in the Italic branch is disputed are Venetic and Siculian. These long-extinct languages are known only from inscriptions in archaeological finds.

In the first millennium BC, several (other) non-Italic languages were spoken in the peninsula, including members of other branches of Indo-European (such as Celtic and Greek) as well as at least one non-Indo-European one, Etruscan.

It is generally believed that those 1st millennium Italic languages descend from Indo-European languages brought by migrants to the peninsula sometime in the 2nd millennium BC through Bell Beaker and Urnfield culture groups north and east of the Alps. However, the source of those migrations and the history of the languages in the peninsula are still a matter of debate among historians. In particular, it is debated whether the ancient Italic languages all descended from a single Proto-Italic language after its arrival in the region, or whether the migrants brought two or more Indo-European languages that were only distantly related.

With over 900 million native speakers, the Romance languages make Italic the second-most-widely spoken branch of the Indo-European family, after Indo-Iranian at 1.7 billion native speakers. However, in academia the ancient Italic languages form a separate field of study from the medieval and modern Romance languages. This article focuses on the ancient languages. For information on the academic study of the Romance languages, see Romance studies.

Most Italic languages (including Romance) are generally written in Old Italic scripts (or the descendant Latin alphabet and its adaptations), which descend from the alphabet used to write the non-Italic Etruscan language, which itself was derived from the Greek alphabet. The notable exceptions are Judaeo-Spanish (also known as Ladino), which is sometimes written in the Hebrew, Greek, or Cyrillic script, and some forms of Romanian, which are written in the Cyrillic script.

== History of the concept ==
Historical linguists have generally concluded that the ancient Indo-European languages of the Italian peninsula that were not identifiable as belonging to other branches of Indo-European, such as Greek, belonged to a single branch of the family, parallel for example to Celtic and Germanic. The founder of this theory is Antoine Meillet (1866–1936).

This unitary theory has been criticized by, among others, Alois Walde, Vittore Pisani and Giacomo Devoto, who proposed that the Latino-Faliscan and Osco-Umbrian languages constituted two distinct branches of Indo-European. This view gained acceptance in the second half of the 20th century, though proponents such as Rix later rejected the idea, and the unitary theory remains dominant in contemporary scholarship.

== Classification ==
The following classification, proposed by Michiel de Vaan (2008), is generally agreed on, although some scholars have recently disputed the inclusion of Venetic in the Italic branch.

- Proto-Italic (or Proto-Italo-Venetic)
  - Proto-Venetic
    - Venetic (550–100 BC)
  - Proto-Latino-Sabellic
    - Latino-Faliscan
      - Early Faliscan (7th–5th c. BC)
        - Middle Faliscan (5th–3rd c. BC)
          - Late Faliscan (3rd–2nd c. BC), strongly influenced by Latin
      - Old Latin (6th–1st c. BC)
        - Classical Latin (1st c. BC–3rd c. AD)
          - Late Latin (3rd–6th c. AD)
        - Vulgar Latin (2nd c. BC–3rd/4th c. AD)
          - Proto-Romance (3rd/4th–8th c. AD), the reconstructed ancestor of Romance languages; non-mutually intelligible with Latin by the 9th c. AD; Romance languages are the only Italic languages still spoken today
            - Gallo-Romance (attested from 842 AD), including French (the earliest attested Romance language) and Franco-Provençal
            - Italo-Dalmatian (c. 960), including Italian and Dalmatian
            - Occitano-Romance (c. 1000), including Catalan and Occitan
            - Ibero-Romance (c. 1075), including Spanish, Portuguese and Galician
            - Rhaeto-Romance (c. 1100), including Romansh, Ladin and Friulian
            - Sardinian (1102)
            - African Romance (extinct; spoken at least until the 12th c. AD)
            - Eastern Romance (1521), including Romanian and Aromanian
    - Sabellic (Osco-Umbrian)
      - Umbrian (7th–1st c. BC), including dialects such as Aequian, Marsian, and Volscian
      - Oscan (5th–1st c. BC), including dialects such as Hernican, North Oscan (Marrucinian, Paelignian, Vestinian), and Sabine (Samnite)
      - Picene languages
        - Pre-Samnite (6th–5th c. BC)
        - South Picene (6th–4th c. BC)
  - (?) Siculian
  - (?) Lusitanian

== History ==
=== Proto-Italic period ===
Proto-Italic was probably originally spoken by Italic tribes north of the Alps. In particular, early contacts with Celtic and Germanic speakers are suggested by linguistic evidence.

Bakkum defines Proto-Italic as a "chronological stage" without an independent development of its own, but extending over late Proto-Indo-European and the initial stages of Proto-Latin and Proto-Sabellic. Meiser's dates of 4000 BC to 1800 BC, well before Mycenaean Greek, are described by him as being "as good a guess as anyone's". Schrijver argues for a Proto-Italo-Celtic stage, which he suggests was spoken in "approximately the first half or the middle of the 2nd millennium BC", from which Celtic split off first, then Venetic, before the remainder, Italic, split into Latino-Faliscan and Sabellian.

Italic peoples probably moved towards the Italian Peninsula during the second half of the 2nd millennium BC, gradually reaching the southern regions. Although an equation between archeological and linguistic evidence cannot be established with certainty, the Proto-Italic language is generally associated with the Terramare (1700–1150 BC) and Proto-Villanovan culture (1200–900 BC).

=== Languages of Italy in the Iron Age ===
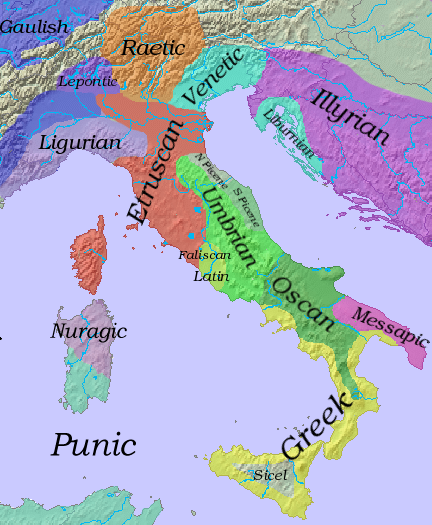
Main linguistic groups in Iron-Age Italy and the surrounding areas. Some of those languages have left very little evidence, and their classification is quite uncertain. The Punic language brought to Sardinia by the Punics coexisted with the indigenous and non-Italic Paleo-Sardinian, or Nuragic.

At the start of the Iron Age, around 700 BC, Ionian Greek settlers from Euboea established colonies along the coast of southern Italy. They brought with them the alphabet, which they had learned from the Phoenicians; specifically, what we now call the Western Greek alphabet. The invention quickly spread through the whole peninsula, across language and political barriers. Local adaptations (mainly minor letter shape changes and the dropping or addition of a few letters) yielded several Old Italic alphabets.

The inscriptions show that, by 700 BC, many languages were spoken in the region, including members of several branches of Indo-European and several non-Indo-European languages. The most important of the latter was Etruscan, attested by evidence from more than 10,000 inscriptions and some short texts. No relation has been found between Etruscan and any other known language, and there is still no clue about its possible origin (except for inscriptions on the island of Lemnos in the eastern Mediterranean). Other possibly non-Indo-European languages present at the time were Rhaetian in the Alpine region, Ligurian around present-day Genoa, and some unidentified languages in Sardinia. Those languages have left some detectable imprint in Latin.

The largest language in southern Italy, except Ionic Greek spoken in the Greek colonies, was Messapian, known from some 260 inscriptions dating from the 6th and 5th centuries BC. There is a historical connection of Messapian with the Illyrian tribes, added to the archaeological connection in ceramics and metals existing between both peoples, which motivated the hypothesis of linguistic connection. But the evidence of Illyrian inscriptions is reduced to personal names and places, which makes it difficult to support such a hypothesis.

It has also been proposed by some scholars, although not confirmed, that the Lusitanian language may have belonged to the Italic family.

=== Timeline of Latin ===
In the history of Latin of ancient times, there are several periods:

- From the archaic period, several inscriptions of the 6th to the 4th centuries BC, fragments of the oldest laws, fragments from the sacral anthem of the Salii, the anthem of the Arval Brethren were preserved.
- In the pre-classical period (3rd and 2nd centuries BC), the literary Latin language (the comedies of Plautus and Terence, the agricultural treatise of Cato the Elder, fragments of works by a number of other authors) was based on the dialect of Rome.
- The period of classical ("golden") Latin dated until the death of Ovid in AD 17 (1st century BC, the development of vocabulary, the development of terminology, the elimination of old morphological doublets, the flowering of literature: Cicero, Caesar, Sallust, Virgil, Horace, Ovid) was particularly distinguished.
- During the period of classical ("silver") Latin dated until the death of emperor Marcus Aurelius in AD 180, seeing works by Juvenal, Tacitus, Suetonius and the Satyricon of Petronius, during which time the phonetic, morphological and spelling norms were finally formed.

As the Roman Republic extended its political dominion over the whole of the Italian peninsula, Latin became dominant over the other Italic languages, which ceased to be spoken perhaps sometime in the 1st century AD. From Vulgar Latin, the Romance languages emerged.

The Latin language gradually spread beyond Rome, along with the growth of the power of this state, displacing, beginning in the 4th and 3rd centuries BC, the languages of other Italic tribes, as well as Illyrian, Messapian and Venetic, etc. The Romanisation of the Italian Peninsula was basically complete by the 1st century BC; except for the south of Italy and Sicily, where the dominance of Greek was preserved. The attribution of Ligurian is controversial.

== Origin theories ==
The main debate concerning the origin of the Italic languages mirrors that on the origins of the Greek ones, except that there is no record of any "early Italic" to play the role of Mycenaean Greek.

All that is known about the linguistic landscape of Italy is from inscriptions made after the introduction of the alphabet in the peninsula, around 700 BC onwards, and from Greek and Roman writers several centuries later. The oldest known samples come from Umbrian and Faliscan inscriptions from the 7th century BC. Their alphabets were clearly derived from the Etruscan alphabet, which was derived from the Western Greek alphabet not much earlier than that. There is no reliable information about the languages spoken before that time. Some conjectures can be made based on toponyms, but they cannot be verified.

There is no guarantee that the intermediate phases between those old Italic languages and Indo-European will be found. The question of whether Italic originated outside Italy or developed by assimilation of Indo-European and other elements within Italy, approximately on or within its current range there, remains.

An extreme view of some linguists and historians is that there never was a unique "Proto-Italic" whose diversification resulted in an "Italic branch" of Indo-European. Some linguists, like Silvestri and Rix, further argue that no common Proto-Italic can be reconstructed such that its phonological system may have developed into those of Latin and Osco-Umbrian through consistent phonetic changes and that its phonology and morphology can be consistently derived from those of Proto-Indo-European. However, Rix later changed his mind and became an outspoken supporter of Italic as a family.

Those linguists propose instead that the ancestors of the 1st millennium Indo-European languages of Italy were two or more different languages that separately descended from Indo-European in a more remote past and separately entered Europe, possibly by different routes or at different times. That view stems in part from the difficulty in identifying a common Italic homeland in prehistory, or reconstructing an ancestral "Common Italic" or "Proto-Italic" language from which those languages could have descended. Some common features that seem to connect the languages may be just a sprachbund phenomenon – a linguistic convergence due to contact over a long period, as in the most widely accepted version of the Italo-Celtic hypothesis.

== Characteristics ==
General and specific characteristics of the pre-Roman Italic languages:

- in phonetics: Oscan (in comparison with Latin and Umbrian) preserved all positions of old diphthongs ai, oi, ei, ou, in the absence of rhotacism, the absence of sibilants, in the development of kt > ht; a different interpretation of Indo-European kw and gw (Latin qu and v, Osco-Umbrian p and b); in the latter the preservation of s in front of nasal sonants and the reflection of Indo-European *dh and *bh as f; initial stress (in Latin, it was reconstructed in the historical period), which led to syncopation and the reduction of vowels of unstressed syllables;
- in the syntax: many convergences; In Osco-Umbrian, impersonal constructions, parataxis, partitive genitive, temporal genitive and genitive relationships are more often used;

=== Phonology ===
The most distinctive feature of the Italic languages is the development of the PIE voiced aspirated stops. In initial position, *bʰ-, *dʰ- and *gʷʰ- merged to /f-/, while *gʰ- became /h-/, although Latin also has *gʰ- > /w-/ and /g-/ in special environments.

In medial position, all voiced aspirated stops have a distinct reflex in Latin, with different outcome for -*gʰ- and *gʷʰ- if preceded by a nasal. In Osco-Umbrian, they generally have the same reflexes as in initial position, although Umbrian shows a special development if preceded by a nasal, just as in Latin. Most probably, the voiced aspirated stops went through an intermediate stage *-β-, *-ð-, *-ɣ- and *-ɣʷ- in Proto-Italic.

Italic reflexes of PIE voiced aspirated stops
	initial position				medial position			
	*bʰ-	*dʰ-	*gʰ-	*gʷʰ-	*-(m)bʰ-	*-(n)dʰ-	*-(n)gʰ-	*-(n)gʷʰ-
Latin	f-	f-	h-	f-	-b- -mb-	-d- (Note: Also -b- in certain environments.) -nd-	-h- -ng-	-v- -ngu-
Faliscan	f-	f-	h-	?	-f-	-f-	-g-	?
Umbrian	f-	f-	h-	?	-f- -mb-	-f- -nd-	-h- -ng-	-f- ?
Oscan	f-	f-	h-	?	-f-	-f-	-h-	?

The voiceless and plain voiced stops (*p, *t, *k, *kʷ; *b, *d, *g, *gʷ) remained unchanged in Latin, except for the minor shift of *gʷ > /w/. In Osco-Umbrian, the labiovelars *kʷ and *gʷ became the labial stops /p/ and /b/, e.g. Oscan pis 'who?' (cf. Latin quis) and bivus 'alive (nom.pl.)' (cf. Latin vivus).

=== Grammar ===
In grammar there are basically three innovations shared by the Osco-Umbrian and the Latino-Faliscan languages:

- A suffix in the imperfect subjunctive *-sē- (in Oscan the 3rd person singular of the imperfect subjunctive fusíd and Latin foret, both derivatives of *fusēd).
- A suffix in the imperfect indicative *-fā- (Oscan fufans 'they were', in Latin this suffix became -bā- as in portabāmus 'we carried').
- A suffix to derive gerundive adjectives from verbs *-ndo- (Latin operandam 'which will be built'; in Osco-Umbrian there is the additional reduction -nd- > -nn-, Oscan úpsannam 'which will be built', Umbrian pihaner 'which will be purified').

In turn, these shared innovations are one of the main arguments in favour of an Italic group, questioned by other authors.

=== Lexical comparison ===
Among the Indo-European languages, the Italic languages share a higher percentage of lexicon with the Celtic and the Germanic ones, three of the four traditional "centum" branches of Indo-European (together with Greek).

The following table shows a lexical comparison of several Italic languages:

Gloss	Latino-Faliscan			Osco-Umbrian		Proto- Italic	Proto- Celtic	Proto- Germanic
Gloss	Faliscan	Old Latin	Classical Latin	Oscan	Umbrian	Proto- Italic	Proto- Celtic	Proto- Germanic
'1'		oinos	ūnus	*𐌞𐌝𐌍𐌔 *úíns	𐌖𐌍𐌔 uns	*oinos	*oinos	*ainaz
'2'	du		duō	*𐌃𐌖𐌔 *dus	-𐌃𐌖𐌚 -duf	*duō	*dwāu	*twai
'3'	tris		trēs (m.f.) tria (n.)	𐌕𐌓𐌝𐌔 trís	𐌕𐌓𐌉𐌚 (m.f.) 𐌕𐌓𐌉𐌉𐌀 (n.) trif (m.f.) triia (n.)	*trēs (m.f.) *triā (n.)	*trīs	*þrīz
'4'			quattuor	𐌐𐌄𐌕𐌕𐌉𐌖𐌓 pettiur	𐌐𐌄𐌕𐌖𐌓 petur	*kʷettwōr	*kʷetwares	*fedwōr
'5'	*quique		quinque	*𐌐𐌞𐌌𐌐𐌄 *púmpe	*𐌐𐌖𐌌𐌐𐌄 *pumpe	*kʷenkʷe	*kʷenkʷe	*fimf
'6'	śex		sex	*𐌔𐌄𐌇𐌔? *𐌔𐌄𐌔𐌔? *sehs? *sess?	𐌔𐌄𐌇𐌔 sehs	*seks	*swexs	*sehs
'7'	*śepten		septem	*𐌔𐌄𐌚𐌕𐌄𐌌 *seftem		*septem	*sextam	*sebun
'8'	oktu		octō	*𐌞𐌇𐌕𐌖 *úhtu		*oktō	*oxtū	*ahtōu
'9'	*neven		novem	*𐌍𐌞𐌅𐌄𐌍 *núven	*𐌍𐌖𐌖𐌉𐌌 *nuvim	*nowen	*nawan	*newun
'10'			decem	*𐌃𐌄𐌊𐌄𐌌 *dekem	*𐌃𐌄𐌔𐌄𐌌 *desem	*dekem	*dekam	*tehun

The asterisk indicates reconstructed forms based on indirect linguistic evidence and not forms directly attested in any inscription.

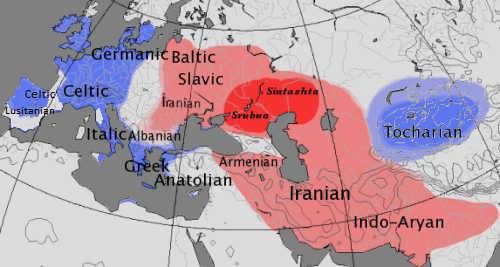
Map showing the approximate extent of the centum (blue) and satem (red) areals

From the point of view of Proto-Indo-European, the Italic languages are fairly conservative. In phonology, the Italic languages are centum languages by merging the palatals with the velars (Latin centum has a /k/) but keeping the combined group separate from the labio-velars. In morphology, the Italic languages preserve six cases in the noun and the adjective (nominative, accusative, genitive, dative, ablative, vocative) with traces of a seventh (locative), but the dual of both the noun and the verb has completely disappeared. From the position of both morphological innovations and uniquely shared lexical items, Italic shows the greatest similarities with Celtic and Germanic, with some of the shared lexical correspondences also being found in Baltic and Slavic.

=== P-Italic and Q-Italic languages ===
Similar to Celtic languages, the Italic languages are also divided into P- and Q-branches, depending on the reflex of Proto-Indo-European *kʷ. In the languages of the Osco-Umbrian branch, *kʷ gave p, whereas the languages of the Latino-Faliscan branch preserved it (Latin qu [kʷ]).

== See also ==
- Italo-Celtic
- Italic peoples
- List of ancient peoples of Italy
- Romance languages
- Indo-European languages
- Languages of Italy

== Sources ==
- Baldi, Philip (2017). "The syntax of Italic". In Klein, Jared; Joseph, Brian; Fritz, Matthias (eds.). Handbook of Comparative and Historical Indo-European Linguistics. Vol. 2. Walter de Gruyter. ISBN 978-3-11-054243-1.
- Bakkum, Gabriël C. L. M. (2009). The Latin Dialect of the Ager Faliscus: 150 Years of Scholarship. Amsterdam University Press. ISBN 978-90-5629-562-2.
- Bossong, Georg (2017). "The Evolution of Italic". In Klein, Jared; Joseph, Brian; Fritz, Matthias (eds.). Handbook of Comparative and Historical Indo-European Linguistics. Vol. 2. Walter de Gruyter. ISBN 978-3-11-054243-1.

de Vaan, Michiel (2008). Etymological Dictionary of Latin and the other Italic Languages. Brill. ISBN 978-90-04-16797-1.

- Fortson, Benjamin W. (2004). Indo-European Language and Culture. Blackwell. ISBN 978-1-4443-5968-8.
- Fortson, Benjamin W. (2017). "The dialectology of Italic". In Klein, Jared; Joseph, Brian; Fritz, Matthias (eds.). Handbook of Comparative and Historical Indo-European Linguistics. Vol. 2. Walter de Gruyter. ISBN 978-3-11-054243-1.
- Hartmann, Markus (2018). "105. Siculian". In Klein, Jared; Joseph, Brian; Fritz, Matthias (eds.). Handbook of Comparative and Historical Indo-European Linguistics. Vol. 3. Berlin: Walter de Gruyter. pp. 1854–1857. doi:10.1515/9783110542431-026. ISBN 978-3-11-054243-1. S2CID 242076323.
- Herman, Jozsef (2000). Vulgar Latin. Pennsylvania State University Press. ISBN 978-0-271-04177-3.
- Mallory, James P.; Adams, Douglas Q. (1997). "Italic Languages". Encyclopedia of Indo-European Culture. Fitzroy Dearborn. pp. 314–319. ISBN 978-1-884964-98-5.
- Meiser, Gerhard (2017). "47. The phonology of Italic". In Klein, Jared; Joseph, Brian; Fritz, Matthias (eds.). Handbook of Comparative and Historical Indo-European Linguistics. Vol. 2. Walter de Gruyter. pp. 743–751. doi:10.1515/9783110523874-002. ISBN 978-3-11-054243-1.
- Poccetti, Paolo (2017). "The documentation of Italic". In Klein, Jared; Joseph, Brian; Fritz, Matthias (eds.). Handbook of Comparative and Historical Indo-European Linguistics. Vol. 2. Walter de Gruyter. ISBN 978-3-11-054243-1.
- Posner, Rebecca (1996). The Romance Languages. Cambridge University Press. ISBN 978-0-521-28139-3.
- Schrijver, Peter (2016). "Ancillary Study: Sound Change, the Italo-Celtic Linguistic Unity, and the Italian Homeland of Celtic". In Koch, John T.; Cunliffe, Barry (eds.). Celtic from the West 3. Atlantic Europe in the Metal Ages: questions of shared language. Oxbow Books. pp. 489–502. ISBN 978-1-78570-227-3.
- Silvestri, Domenico (1998). "The Italic Languages". In Ramat, A. (ed.). The Indo-European Languages. pp. 322–344.
- Stuart-Smith, Jane (2004). Phonetics and Philology: Sound Change in Italic. Oxford University Press. ISBN 978-0-19-925773-7.
- Villar, Francisco (2000). Indoeuropeos y no indoeuropeos en la Hispania prerromana. Universidad de Salamanca. ISBN 978-84-7800-968-8.
- Vine, Brent (2017). "48. The morphology of Italic". In Klein, Jared; Joseph, Brian; Fritz, Matthias (eds.). Handbook of Comparative and Historical Indo-European Linguistics. Vol. 2. Walter de Gruyter. pp. 751–804. doi:10.1515/9783110523874-003. ISBN 978-3-11-054243-1.
