= Pre-Samnite language =

Ancient Italic language

Pre-Samnite
- A Pre-Samnite inscription from Nuceria found on a bucchero jug. The text reads "Bruties esum". Dated to the 6th-century BCE.
- Native to: Italy
- Region: Campania
- Era: 6th–5th centuries BC
- Language family: Indo-European: Italic; Osco-Umbrian; (unclassified); Pre-Samnite

Language codes
- ISO 639-3: None (mis)
- Glottolog: pres1240

Pre-Samnite was an ancient language spoken in southern Campania, in Italy. The name Pre-Samnite refers to the fact that the language was spoken in early times in an area that was later colonized by Samnites, who spoke Oscan. Pre-Samnite is recorded in a few short inscriptions dating from around 500 BC. The language belongs to the Osco-Umbrian group of languages, and may be closely related to Oscan, but shows a number of archaic features which were lost from Oscan. However, the material is too scant to enable a precise determination of the relation of Pre-Samnite either to Oscan or to the other Sabellian languages.

== Sample text ==
The following text is a proposed reconstruction of a Pre-Samnite inscription found in Tortora:

"[πον/πονν]ει ι[ι]οϝιιοι

fεfικεδ [ε]κ[υ] ρε[κ]

[τ]ισυμαδ αματες

[ν]ε πυσμοι αυνοι ϝι[τλοι]

[ε]ντρο[σ]δ οσερϝια[τοδ]

[2]ενς [ν]ει ϙοβετι[ϝ]το α [h]ιρνενι[α]

[ν]οι ϝολαισυμος fυfϝοδ ο fρι

ϙτο[ς] αστ εσ[μ]ι τερμανι[ν]

[πραι]τοϝτιδ νεπ ιες

σ[ϝ]εδ ϝολος fυfυϝοδ

νεπ ιστα[κ] ιοσϙτοδ

αα [h]ιρνενια"

The proposed translation for this text reads:

"Whenever one sacrificed (a yearling lamb) to Jovius, thus they very rightly decreed: no one shall observe this yearling lamb’s entrails by speaking; no one shall libate in the vase nor on the flawless roasted (entrails) by uttering words; and at this border sign before the city no one shall libate on these flawless (entrails) or pour broth on this vase."

Another proposed reconstruction of the Tortora inscriptions reads:

[5]ειι[.]οϝιιοι…[--

--]fεfικεδ[.]κ[.]ρε.[--

--]ισυμαδαματεσ[--

--]επυσμοιαυνοιϝι[--

--]ντρο[.]δοσερϝια[--

[2]ενσ[.]ειϙοβετι[.]τοα[.]ιρνενι[

--]οιϝολαισυμοσfυfϝοδο(vacat)fρι[?]

ϙτο[..]αστεσ[.]ιτερμανι[--

--]τοϝτιδνεπιεσε[--

--]σ[.]εδϝολοσfυfυϝοδ

νεπιστα[.]ιοσϙτοδ[--

--]αα[.]ιρνενια

[4-5]νια[.]ε[.]ιι[?]υ[.]αμ[.]υουϝ[6-9]

Another possibly Pre-Samnite inscription which was probably from Capua reads:

niumsies tanunies est

paplam tens atriiam fufuhud niumsis tanunis eises ulsu dunum dedum

The original text was written in scriptio continua and in the Oscan alphabet.
