= Vestinian language =

Extinct Italic language

Vestinian
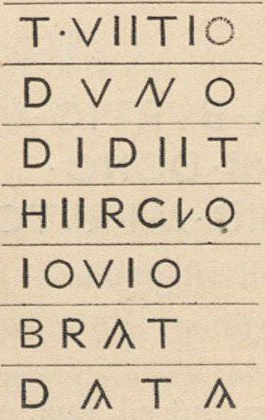
- Facsimile of a Vestinian inscription
- Region: East-central Italy
- Era: ca. 250–100 BC
- Language family: Indo-European: Italic; Osco-Umbrian; Oscan?; Vestinian

Language codes
- ISO 639-3: xvs
- Glottolog: vest1239

Vestinian is an extinct Italic language documented only in two surviving inscriptions of the Roman Republic. It is presumed to have been anciently spoken by the tribe of the Vestini, who occupied the region within current Abruzzo from Gran Sasso to the Adriatic Sea in east-central Italy during that time. Vestini is the Roman exonym for the people. Not enough of their presumed language survives to classify it beyond Italic. Vestinian is one of a number of scantily attested Italic languages spoken in small regions of the Apennines directly east of Rome called generally "the minor dialects". There is currently no agreement on their precise classification. However, de Vaan's consensus classification has it as Osco-Umbrian, closely related to Oscan (see Italic languages § Classification).

== Corpus ==
Only two inscriptions survive.

== Sample text ==
CIL 1^{2}.394 from near Navelli in the Abruzzo, dates from the mid-third-century BC. The inscription reads:

Vestinian text:

t.vetio | duno | didet | herclo | iovio | brat | data

Translation into Latin:

T. Vetius donum dedit Herculi Jovio. Grate data.

Translation into English:

Vettius gives a gift to Hercules son of Jupiter because of a favour given

== Bibliography ==
- Stuart-Smith, Jane (2004). Phonetics and philology: sound change in Italic. Oxford: Oxford University Press.
- Adams, J. N. (2007). The Regional Diversification of Latin 200 BC - AD 600. Cambridge: Cambridge University Press. ISBN 978-0-521-88149-4.
