= Benjamin W. Fortson IV =

American linguist

Benjamin Wynn Fortson IV is an American linguist. Fortson received his B.A. from Yale University in 1989 and his PhD from Harvard University in 1996. He is Professor of Greek and Latin Language, Literature and Historical Linguistics at the University of Michigan College of Literature, Science, and the Arts. Fortson specializes in the comparative linguistic study of the Indo-European languages, focusing primarily on the Italic, Hellenic, Indo-Iranian, Anatolian, Celtic, and Germanic branches. He was for many years Senior Lexicographer of The American Heritage Dictionary of the English Language, and is the Editor-in-Chief of Beech Stave Press.

== Selected bibliography ==
- Indo-European Language and Culture: An Introduction, 2004.
- Benjamin W. Fortson IV: Indo-European Language and Culture. An Introduction. Second edition. Wiley-Blackwell, Malden, MA / Chichester 2010 (First edition 2004), ISBN 978-1-4051-8896-8.
- Language and Rhythm in Plautus. De Gruyter, 2008.
