= Rapino =

- Comune
- Comune di Rapino
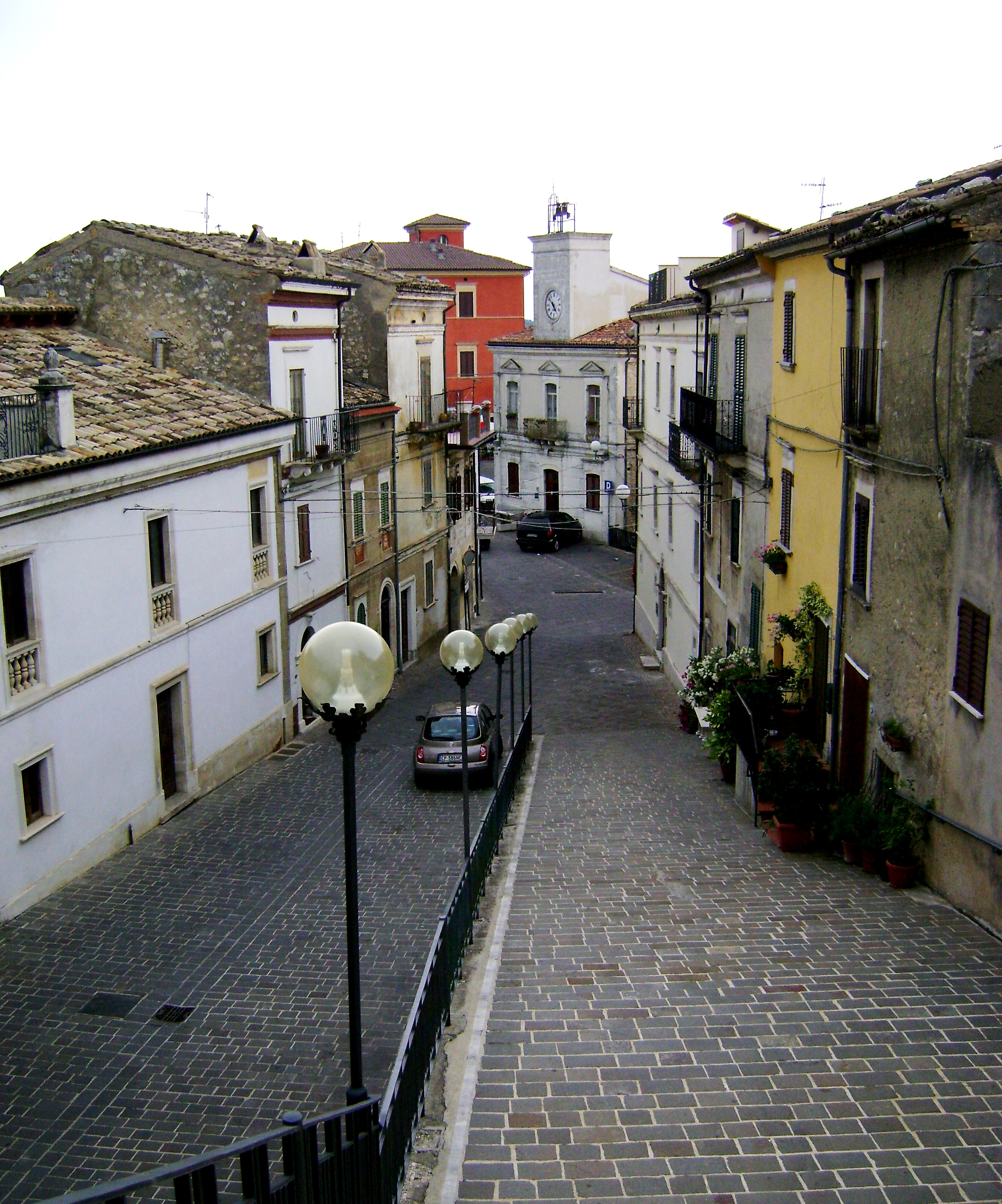
- Center of Rapino

- Location within Italy Location within Abruzzo
- Coordinates: 42°13′N 14°11′E
- Country: Italy
- Region: Abruzzo
- Province: Chieti (CH)
- Frazioni: Colle Case Nuove, Ortaglio, Piano, Terra, Vicenne

Area
  - Total: 20 km^{2} (7.7 sq mi)
- Elevation: 420 m (1,380 ft)

Population (1 January 2007)
  - Total: 1,471
  - Density: 74/km^{2} (190/sq mi)
- Demonym: Rapinesi
- Time zone: UTC+1 (CET)
  - Summer (DST): UTC+2 (CEST)
- Postal code: 66010
- Dialing code: 0871
- ISTAT code: 069071
- Patron saint: San Lorenzo
- Saint day: 10 August
- Website: Official website

Rapino is a comune (municipality) and town in the Province of Chieti in the Abruzzo region of Italy.
