= Philip Baldi =

American philologist

- Born: Scranton, Pennsylvania, US

Academic background
- Education: University of Scranton (BA); University of Rochester (MA, PhD)

Academic work
- Discipline: Linguist
- Sub-discipline: Indo-European studies
- Institutions: Pennsylvania State University

Philip Baldi (born 1946) is an American linguist and classical scholar specializing in Indo-European studies. He is Professor Emeritus of Linguistics and Classics at Pennsylvania State University.

== Biography ==
Baldi was born in Scranton, Pennsylvania in 1946. He received his B.A. from the University of Scranton in Classics in 1968, his M.A. and Ph.D. in Linguistics from the University of Rochester in 1971 and 1973, respectively. He was appointed Professor of Linguistics and Classics at Pennsylvania State University in 1981. Baldi specializes in Indo-European studies, on which he is the author of numerous books and articles.

== Works ==
- Baldi, Philip (1978). Readings in Historical Phonology: Chapters in the Theory of Sound Change. Pennsylvania State University Press. ISBN 978-0-271-00539-3.
- Baldi, Philip (1983). An Introduction to the Indo-European Languages. SIU Press. ISBN 978-0-8093-1091-3.
- Baldi, Philip (1990). Linguistic Change and Reconstruction Methodology. Walter de Gruyter. ISBN 978-3-11-088609-2.
- Baldi, Philip (1991). Patterns of Change - Change of Patterns: Linguistic Change and Reconstruction Methodology. Walter de Gruyter. ISBN 978-3-11-087189-0. (Condensed version of above, primarily for classroom use)
- Baldi, Philip (1999). The Foundations of Latin. Walter de Gruyter. ISBN 978-3-11-080711-0.
- Baldi, Philip; Dini, Pietro U. (2004). Studies in Baltic and Indo-European Linguistics: In Honor of William R. Schmalstieg. John Benjamins Publishing. ISBN 978-1-58811-584-3.
