= Paeligni =

Italic tribe in the Valle Peligna

The Paeligni or Peligni were an Italic tribe of Sabine origin who lived in the Valle Peligna, in what is now Abruzzo, central Italy.

== History ==
The Paeligni are first mentioned as a member of a confederacy that included the Marsi, Marrucini, and Vestini, with which the Romans came into conflict in the Second Samnite War, 325 BC. Like other Oscan-Umbrian populations, they were governed by supreme magistrates known as meddices (singular meddix). Their religion included deities, such as the Dioscuri, Cerfum (a water god), and Anaceta (the Roman Angitia), a goddess associated with snakes.

On the submission of the Samnites, they all came into alliance with Rome in 305–302 BC, the Paelignians having fought hard against even this degree of subjection. Each member of the confederacy entered the alliance with Rome as an independent unit, and in none was there any town or community politically separate from the tribe as a whole. Thus the Vestini issued coins of its own in the 3rd century; each of them appears in the list of the allies in the Social War. How purely Italic in sentiment these communities of the mountain country remained appears from the choice of the mountain fortress of Corfinium as the rebel capital. It was renamed Vitellio, the Oscan form of Italia, a name which appears, written in Oscan alphabet, on the coins struck there in 90 BC. The Paeligni were granted Roman citizenship after the Social War, and that was the beginning of the end of their national identity, as they began to adopt Roman culture and language.

=== Gentes of Paeligni origin ===
- Ovidia gens

== See also ==
- List of ancient Italic peoples
