= Marrucini =

Ancient Italic tribe in Abruzzo

The Marrucini were an Italic tribe that occupied a small strip of territory around the ancient Teate (modern Chieti), on the east coast of Abruzzo, Italy, limited by the Aterno and Foro Rivers. Other Marrucinian centers included Ceio (San Valentino in Abruzzo Citeriore), Iterpromium (whose ruins are under the Abbey of San Clemente at Casauria), Civitas Danzica (Rapino), and the port of Aternum (Pescara), shared with the Vestini.

== History ==
The tribe is first mentioned in history as a member of a confederacy with which the Romans came into conflict in the second Samnite War, 325 BC, and it entered the Roman Alliance as a separate unit at the end of that war (see further Paeligni).

== Language ==
=== Gentes of Marrucini origin ===
- Asinia gens

== Legacy ==
Corso Marrucino and Teatro Marrucino

The Corso Marrucino and the Teatro Marrucino are respectively the main historical promenade and theater in Chieti, with its old town lying on the hill of the ancient Teate Marrucinorum.

San Martino sulla Marrucina

San Martino sulla Marrucina is a town in the Province of Chieti, in the Abruzzo region

7515 Marrucino

7515 Marrucino is a main-belt asteroid discovered in 1986 by Giovanni de Sanctis at the European Southern Observatory
