= Testament of Vibius Adiranus =

2nd-century BCE Oscan inscription from Pompeii

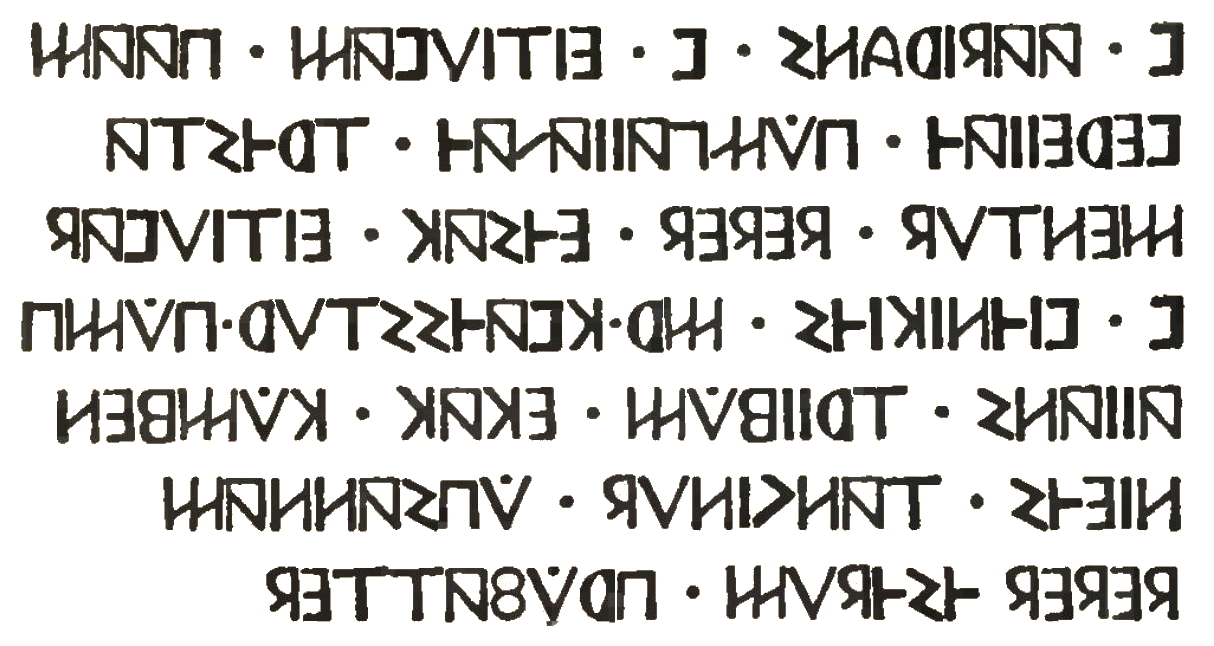
The text of the Testament of Vibius Adiranus as recorded in Questioni Pompeiane (1853, page 25a) by Raffaele Garrucci.

The Testament of Vibius Adiranus is an Oscan language inscription carved onto a travertine stone tablet that was discovered in the Samnite Palaestra section (a small excerise ground), near the Temple of Isis, in the ruins of Pompeii, by archaeologists in the 18th-century. The text records the donation of money by Vibius Adiranus in his will to the construction of a building in Pompeii.

The text is considered by scholars to be one of the best examples of Oscan epigraphy and they date its contents to the 2nd-century BCE in Pompeii. There is debate amongst scholars over whether the physical tablet is itself a 1st-century AD Latinized copy of the 2nd-century BCE Oscan original, or whether the tablet is actually the original 2nd-century BCE Oscan epigraph.

The original tablet is kept in the National Archaeological Museum, Naples.

== Text ==
In Oscan:

v(iíbis). aadirans. v(iíbieís). eítiuvam. paam
vereiiaí. púmpaiianaí. trístaamentud.
deded. eísak. eítiuvad
v(iíbis). viínikiís. m(a)r(aheis).
kvaísstur. púmpaiians.
trííbúm. ekak. kúmbennieís.
tanginud. úpsannam
deded. ísídum. prúfatted

In English, as translated by Katherine McDonald:

Vibis Aadirans, son of Vibis, gave money in his will to the vereiia- of
Pompeii; with this money Vibis Viínikiís, son of Maras, quaestor of
Pompeii, gave the construction of this building by decision of the
senate. The same man approved it

In English, as translated by James Clackson and Geoffrey Horrocks:

The money which Vibius Adiranus son of Vibius gave to the Pompeian state in his will, from this money Vibius Vinicius son of Mr., the Pompeian quaestor, arranged for this house to be built by the decision of the senate and the same man approved it.

=== Analysis of text ===
Much of the text was calqued (or borrowed) from Latin legal language, revealing an extensive Roman influence on contemporary Oscan society. The word "trístaamentud" was likely calqued from Latin "testamento" (meaning "testament"); the phrase "úpsannam deded. ísídum. prúfatted" closely parallels the Latin phrase "faciundas dederunt / eisdemque probaverunt;" and the sequence "kúmbennieís. tanginud" is equivalent in meaning to the Latin phrase "de senatus sententia".

The text is further unique in that the subject of the opening relative clause, Vibis Aadirans himself, and the object of that clause — the money ("eítiuvam") — are both situated at the beginning of the paragraph and precede the relative pronoun "paam" (meaning "which"). Furthermore, the object of the relative clause — which is also the antecedent — is mentioned once more within the later matrix clause — this time in the ablative case. This type of syntax structure is present in other Indo-European languages and thus may have been native to the language, though it may also have been borrowed from Latin. The British archaeologist and linguist Katherine McDonald has suggested that the phrase used within the inscription closely resembles the Latin legal phrase "pecunia quae ... ea pecunia ...."

== Dating ==
Scholars believe that the contents of the inscription implies that the text is Oscan and was originally created in the 2nd-century BCE in Pompeii. The text references the "kvaísstur", a political position likely borrowed from the Latin term, "quaestor". This position ceased to exist following 89 BCE, implying that the text was certainly written before this date.

Italian archaeologist and linguist Paolo Poccetti argues that unusual features of the typography of the text suggests a later date of composition of the tablet. Poccetti notes that the initials for the praenomina, which are at the beginnings of their respective paragraphs, are situated to the right of the text's justification. Pocceti proposes that the regularity and consistency of the letters throughout the text indicate a Latin influence, and thus that the tablet itself is a Latinized 1st-century AD copy of the original inscription. British archaeologist and linguist Katherine McDonald rejects Poccetti's theory, arguing that the textual style of the tablet is much more usual in Oscan than linguists such as Poccetti believe. McDonald compares the regularity of the letters to several Samnite-era Oscan language inscriptions from Pompeii that also feature very standardized orthographies. She also links the unusual text alignment to similar examples of indentation in other known Oscan writings.

McDonald further argues that the tablet lacks other features typical of the later Latinizing of original Oscan inscriptions. For instance, Oscan texts from Pompeii during the period following its Roman conquest after the Third Samnite War (298 to 290 BC), display rounder letters than those of the testament of Vibius. McDonald suggests that several other characteristics of the tablet are also consistent with known 2nd-century BCE Oscan texts, such as the usage of ligatures and word dividers. Additionally, the limestone material on which the tablet is written was frequently used during the 2nd-century BCE to create Oscan texts. The Italian archaeologist Alessandra Avagliano notes that the tablet was more specifically composed of travertine, a type of limestone which she believes is atypical for 2nd-century BCE Oscan writings.

=== Archaeological setting ===
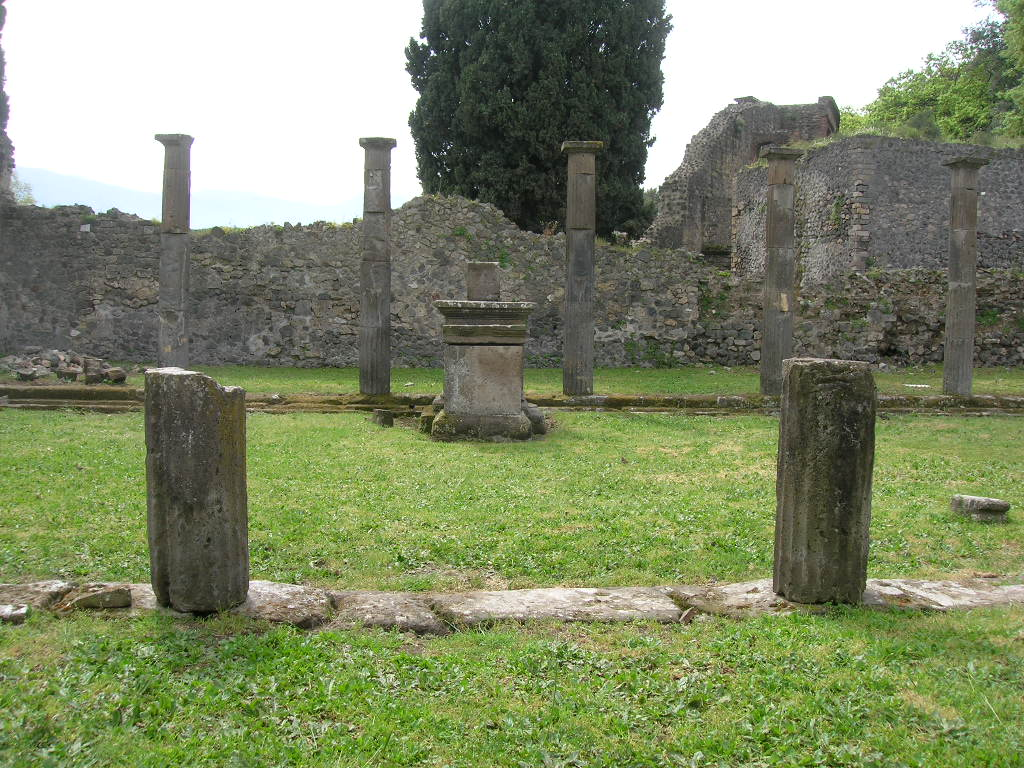
Samnite Palaestra in Pompeii

The original archaeological setting of the text is uncertain as 18th-century archaeologists rarely kept detailed records of their excavations and tended to displace artifacts from their surroundings. It is likely that the text was found within the building now referred to as the Samnite Palaestra, which is near the Temple of Isis, in Pompeii. Although the categorization of the building as a palaestra is still controversial, if the building is interpreted as a palaestra, then the organization to which the finances of Vibius Adiranus were to be left, a group referred to as the "vereiia-", may have functioned in a manner akin to the ephebes in Ancient Greek.

Furthermore, it is unclear whether the original tablet on which the text written was uncovered near, or within, a wall. According to McDonald, the presence of two small protrusions at the top of the tablet, which according to the historian Michael Crawford likely once depicted lions, may indicate that the tablet was not designed to be included within a wall. German classicist Monika Trümper argues that the 3.5-centimetre height of the tablet indicates that it was initially intended to be attached to a wall or a base.

Since the Samnite Palaestra was destroyed in the Pompeiian earthquake of 62 CE, Pocceti proposes that the tablet and inscription was recreated at a later date, thereby explaining the potential discrepancies between the 2nd-century BCE contents of the text and the 1st-century AD style. If Pocceti's proposal is correct, it implies the continued existence of the Oscan language, and Oscan epigraphy, into the Imperial era. However, McDonald suggests that — like with other Oscan inscriptions — it was likely reused as building material and held no particular cultural significance to the Romans. Trümper believes that the testament of Vibius Adiranus was most likely always displayed throughout the history of the Samnite Palaestra.

== See also ==
- Oscan Tablet
