= Women's Classical Committee UK =

Women's Classical Committee
- Abbreviation: WCC
- Formation: 8 March 2015; 11 years ago
- Founded at: Institute of Classical Studies, London
- Co-Chair: Katherine McDonald, Durham University - April 2025 to April 2028
- Co-Chair: Laura Donati, University of Liverpool - April 2024 to April 2026
- Key people: Victoria Leonard (co-chair, 2015); Helen Lovatt (co-chair, 2015-2016); Liz Gloyn; Katherine McDonald

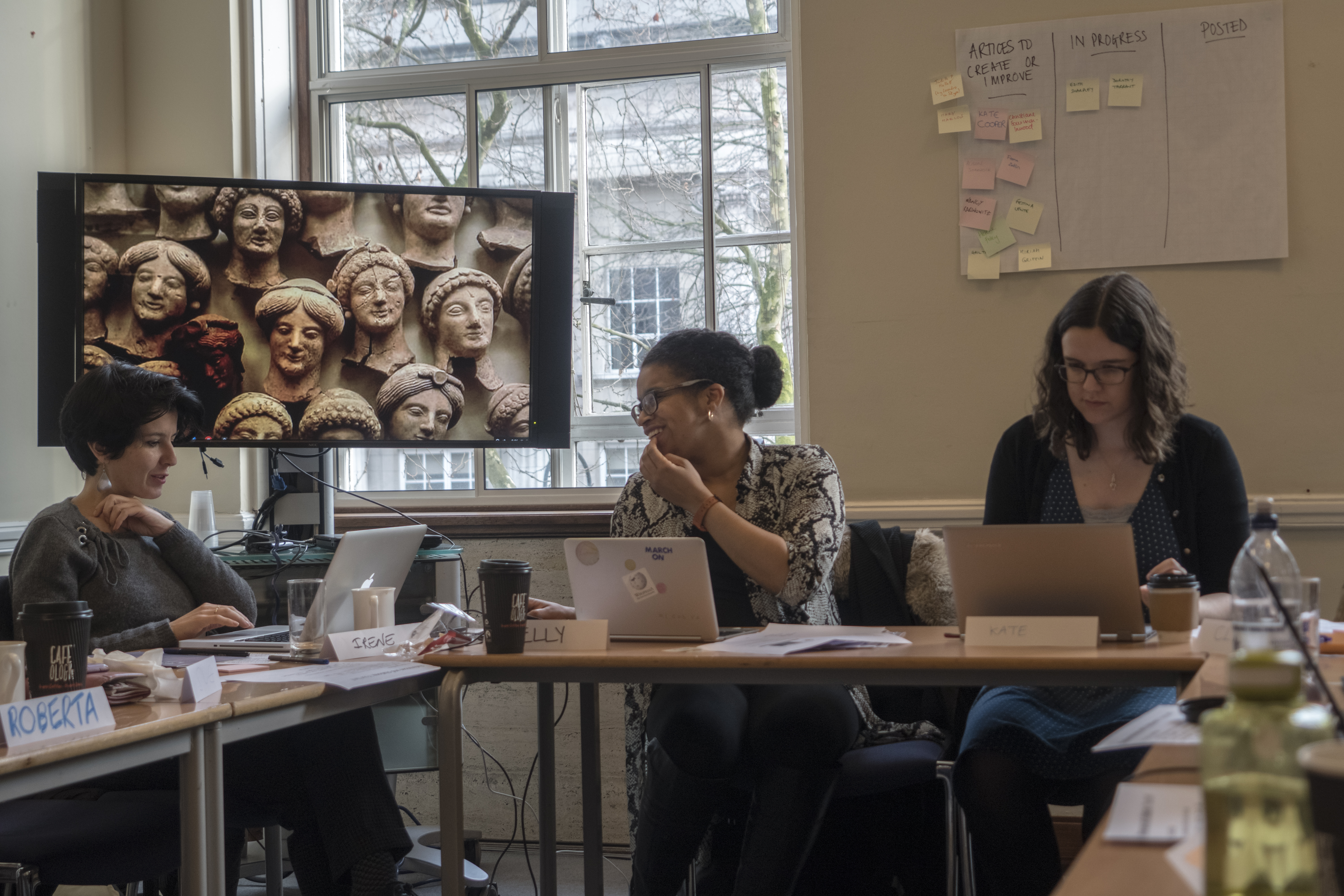
WCC Wikipedia Editathon at Senate House, London (January 2017)

The Women's Classical Committee UK (WCC) is a group of academics, students, and teachers who aim to support women in Classics, promote feminist and gender-informed perspectives in Classics, raise the profile of the study of women in antiquity and Classical reception, and advance equality and diversity in Classics.

== History and aims ==
The WCC was formed in 2015, on International Women's Day, at the Institute of Classical Studies, London. It was inspired by the Women's Classical Caucus in the United States and the Society for Women in Philosophy UK (SWIP). Membership of the WCC is open to all genders. The first chairpersons of the WCC were Victoria Leonard and Helen Lovatt.

The WCC held its launch event, 'Women in Classics: Past, Present and Future', at the Institute of Classical Studies on 11 April 2016. The WCC held its 2017 annual general meeting on 20 April 2017 at the Ioannou Centre, University of Oxford. The theme was 'Diversity in Classics'. The second WCC AGM was held at the Institute of Classical Studies again in April 2018, on the theme of activism with feminist classicists Nancy Sorkin Rabinowitz and Donna Zuckerberg (editor of online magazine Eidolon) as guest speakers.

== Activities ==
The first major event the WCC organised was 'Classics and Feminist Pedagogy: Practical Tips for Teaching', which took place at the University of Birmingham on 29 July 2016.

The WCC has organised careers advice workshops for early- and mid-career academics, and an alternative careers in and around classics event. In September 2017 the WCC organised an event on bullying and harassment in classics hosted by the University of Roehampton.

The WCC has organised a panel of papers at the 2017 Classical Association Conference at the University of Kent and the Classical Association Conference at the University of Leicester. It has sponsored two round table discussions on feminist pedagogy at the 2017 International Medieval Congress at the University of Leeds, and sponsored a double panel on empresses from Late Antiquity at the International Medieval Congress 2018.

During the Covid-19 pandemic, the WCC launched a small grants scheme to support members who had experienced loss of income. This scheme is still active and now supports members in a wide variety of circumstances.

== Activism ==
The WCC organises monthly remote Wikipedia editing sessions in order to continue to reverse the gender skew online and to mobilise change through digital tools as well as providing a positive example for others. Occasional group editing sessions are organised to bring people together to edit to improve the representation of women classicists on Wikipedia, often with training sessions delivered by trainers from the Wikimedia foundation. By June 2017, the WCC had added thirty-nine articles on female classicists to Wikipedia. In 2022, WCCWiki was recognised as Wikimedia UK Partnership of the Year.

In 2018, the WCC wrote to the organisers of the 2019 Fédération internationale des associations d'études classiques and Classical Association joint conference, criticizing their discouragement of proposals for all-female as well as all-male panels (also known as 'manels'). Their activism in this regard caused the organisers to revise their policy, stating that 'Following feedback and discussion we accept that we were wrong to initially discourage all women panels'. In recognition of their efforts towards gender fairness and inclusivity in the field of Classics, the organisation was invited to be a nominating body for the 2021 UK Research Excellence Framework assessment.

== See also ==
- Women's Classical Committee Wikipedia Project
