= Oscan Tablet =

3rd-century BC Oscan inscription

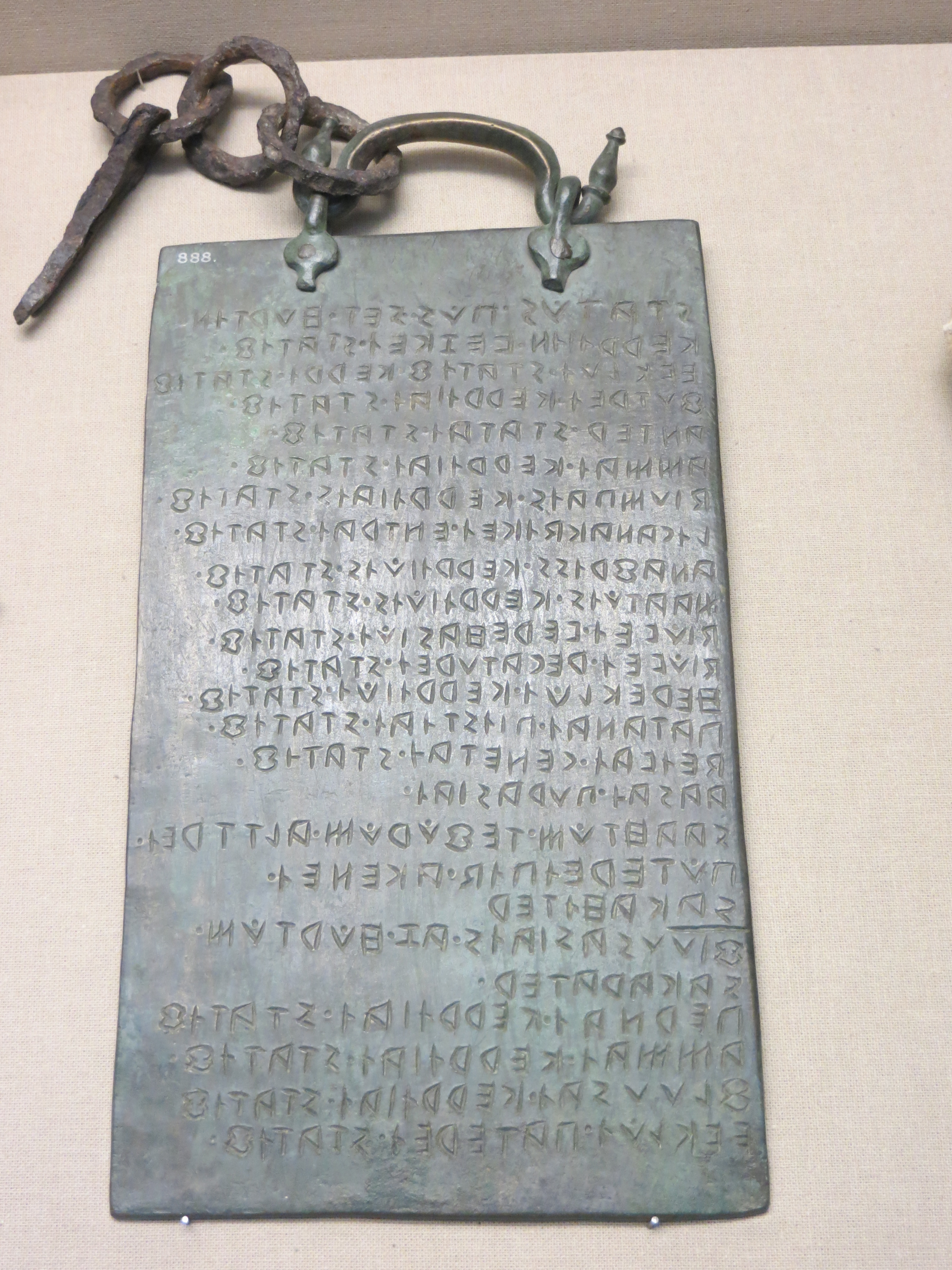
- The front side of the Oscan Tablet in the British Museum
- Material: Bronze
- Size: 28cm by 17cm
- Writing: Oscan
- Created: 300-100 BC
- Present location: British Museum, London
- Registration: 1873,0820.149

The Oscan Tablet (Latin Tabula Osca) or Agnone Tablet is a bronze inscription written in the Oscan alphabet that dates to the 3rd century BC. It was found near the town of Agnone in Molise, Italy. Since 1873, the original has been kept in the British Museum. It is, along with the Tabula Bantina and the Abellano Boundary Stone from Avella, one of the most important inscriptions extant in the long extinct Oscan language.

== Discovery ==
This small bronze tablet, attached to an iron chain, was discovered at Fonte di Romito, between Capracotta and Agnone in 1848. It was purchased from the dealer Alessandro Castellani by the British Museum in 1873.

== Inscription ==
Inscribed on both sides, the tablet chronicles a series of dedications to different deities or supernatural beings. The front side has 25 lines and describes the sacred place where religious ceremonies in honour of the goddess Ceres took place. It also explains that every year during the Floralia festival worshipers were expected to offer sacrifices to four different gods and that every other year a special ceremony was held at the sanctuary's altar. The other side of the tablet (with 23 lines) lists 17 different divinities that the local Samnite population were at any one stage devoted to. It also states that only those paying regular dues would be admitted to the sanctuary.

== See also ==
- Tabula Bantina
- Iguvine Tablets
