= Banzi =

- Comune
- Comune di Banzi
- Location within Italy Location within Basilicata
- Coordinates: 40°51′42″N 16°00′46″E
- Country: Italy
- Region: Basilicata
- Province: Potenza (PZ)

Government
  - Mayor: Nicola Vertone

Area
  - Total: 83.05 km^{2} (32.07 sq mi)
- Elevation: 571 m (1,873 ft)

Population (30 April 2017)
  - Total: 1,320
  - Density: 15.9/km^{2} (41.2/sq mi)
- Demonyms: Banzesi, Bantini
- Time zone: UTC+1 (CET)
  - Summer (DST): UTC+2 (CEST)
- Postal code: 85010
- Dialing code: 0971
- ISTAT code: 076009
- Website: Official website

Banzi (Lucano: Bànze) is a town and comune in the province of Potenza, Basilicata, southern Italy.

Called Bantia in antiquity, it was the site of the find of the bronze tablet known as the Tabula Bantina, which contains a fragment of the ancient Oscan language.
