= Diana Veteranorum =

Algerian village and ancient city

- Zana Ouled sbaâ
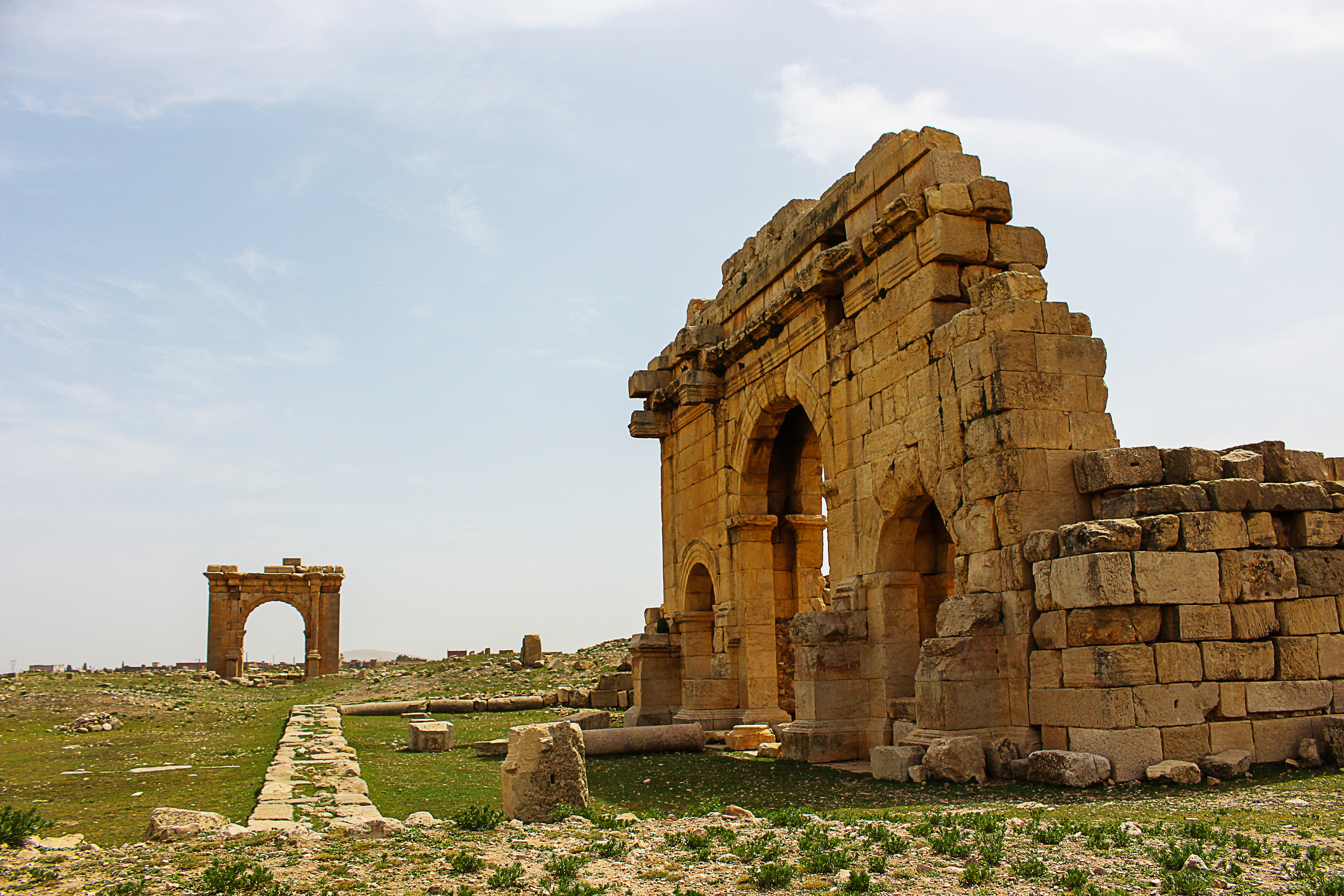
- Ruins of Diana Veteranorum (Zana), 2016

- Location within Algeria
- 35°46′46″N 6°04′31″E
- Location: Algeria
- Region: Batna Province

Diana Veteranorum, today a village called Ain Zana (Aïn Zana), was an ancient Roman-Berber city in Algeria. It was located around 40 km northwest of Lambaesis and 85 km southwest of Cirta.

== History ==
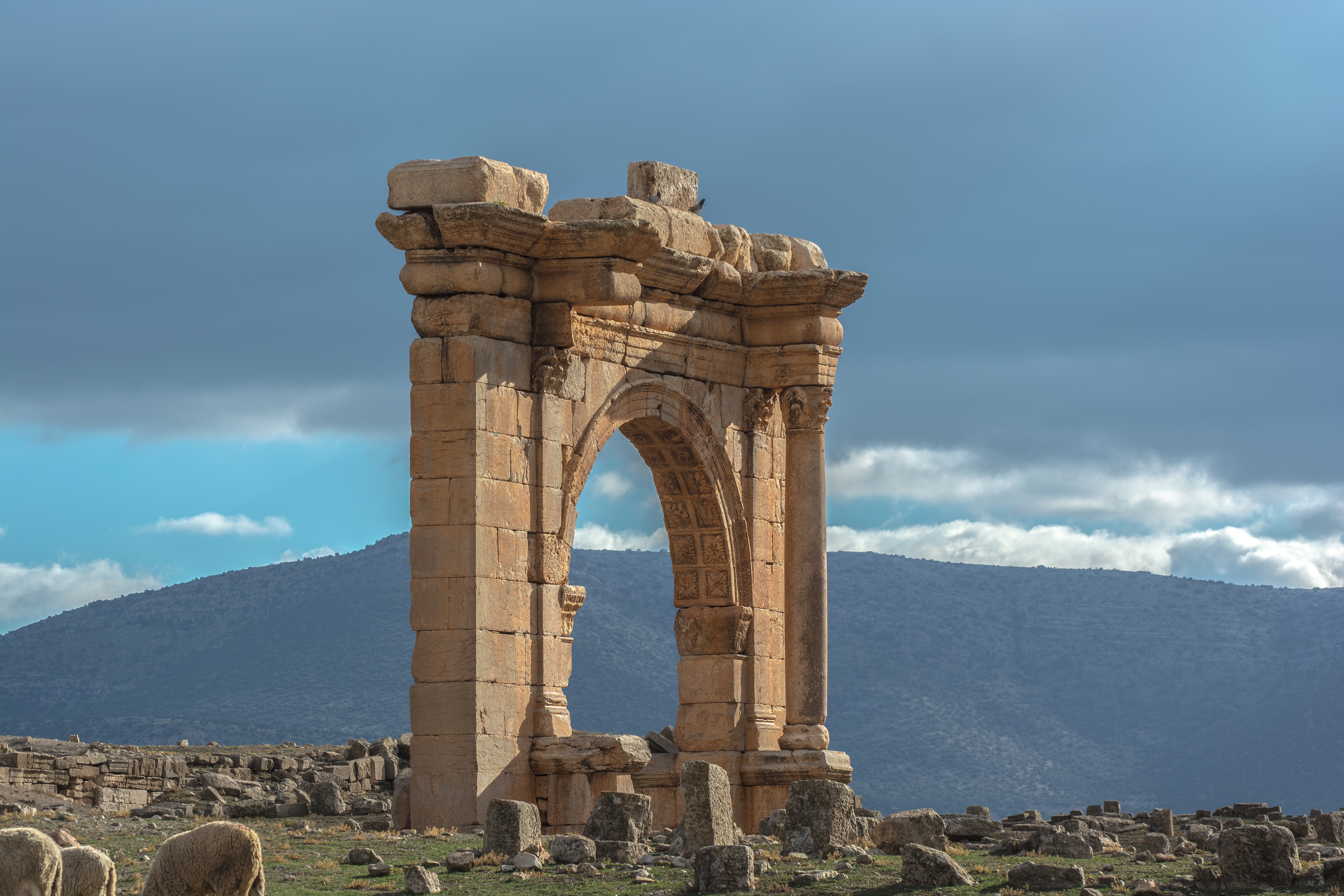
"Arc Diana Veteranorum".

Diana Veteranorum was founded in the connection with the settling of Roman veterans of the Legio III Augusta in northern Africa under the emperor Trajan (98-117). Originally probably only Roman vicus with a police station and a community council (described as rest publica Dianensium in an early inscription). It was later promoted to a municipium, but there's some debate, when that actually happened. While it is established that Diana Veteranorum was a municipium latest by 162, a later discovered inscription suggests that it has been a municipium in 149 already and Jacques Gascou concludes from this inscription that the original promotion happened under Trajan even.

Around 161/162 AD, during the governorship of D. Fonteius Frontinianus the city of Diana Veteranorum was granted the status of a municipium. In 164/165 AD the legate C. Maesius Picatianus issued the construction of a memorial arch for the emperors Marcus Aurelius and Lucius Verus. During these years, Diana Veteranorum saw various construction and renovation measures, however, it is not entirely clear which actual buildings were subject to them. In 217, a triumphal arch was erected for the emperor Macrinus.

A Christian community with a bishop existed since the middle of the third century.

In the Peutinger Table, a map of the Roman empire from the late 4th century, the city is called Ad Dianam. Later, it came under the control of the Byzantine Empire. During the Byzantine period, the city underwent significant changes, and some of the Roman buildings were replaced by or reused for new constructions. A church was built on the forum, and the triumphal arch for Macrinus was integrated into a small fort. In the second half of the 7th century, the city was captured by the expanding Arab empire.

== Archeological site ==
Archeological excavations at the site have yielded a large paved rectangular forum and an aqueduct. In the southeastern area, there are also the remains of a temple that may have been dedicated to the goddess Diana. Two arches have been found, the larger one of which features three openings. An inscription on it indicates that it was erected for the emperor Macrinus in 217. A number of other inscriptions have also been discovered, and in the western part of the city several mausolea have been found.

Three buildings from the Byzantine period have been identified. A small fort (20.2 x 16. m) that had been attached to the arch of Macrinus, and a larger fort (61 x 53 m) about 100 m east of the original forum. Finally a Christian church (33 x 17.1m), that had been built on top of the forum.

== Bibliography ==
- Marcel Le Glay: Diana Veteranorum (Zana) Algeria. In: The Princeton Encyclopedia of Classical sites. Princeton University Press, Princeton 1976 (online copy)
- Werner Huß: Diana Veteranorum. In: Brill's New Pauly. (online)
- Léon Renier: RUINES DE ZANA, L'ANCIENNE DIANA DE NUMIDIE. Revue Archéologique, 9e Année, No. 1 (15 AVRIL AU 15 SEPTEMBRE 1852), pp. 38–45 (French) (JSTOR)
- Anne-Marie Leydier-Bareil: Le Arcs de Triomphe dedies a Caracalla en Afrique Romaine. PhD thesis (Universite Nancy 2), 2006, Vol. II, pp. 309–317 (French) (online (pdf, pp. 64-72))
- Noël Duval: La «Basilique» de Zana (Diana Veteranorum): une nouvelle église à deux absides ou un monument à auges?. In: Mélanges de l’École française de Rome, 89, 1977, pp. 847–873 (online at Persée)
- G. Camps: Diana Veteranorum. In: Encyclopédie berbère, 15, 1995, 2295-2297 (French) (online copy)
- Marietta Horster: Bauinschriften römischer Kaiser. Franz Steiner Verlag 2001, ISBN 978-3-515-07951-8, p. 423-424 (German) (excerpt, p. 423, at Google Books)
- Roberta Marchionni: Eine neue Inschrift des D. Fonteius Frontinianus aus Diana Veteranorum. Zeitschrift für Papyrologie und Epigraphik, Bd. 162, (2007), pp. 290–292 (German) (JSTOR)

== See also ==
- Ain Zana
- List of cultural assets of Algeria
