= Victoria Leonard =

Classicist

Victoria Leonard FRHistS
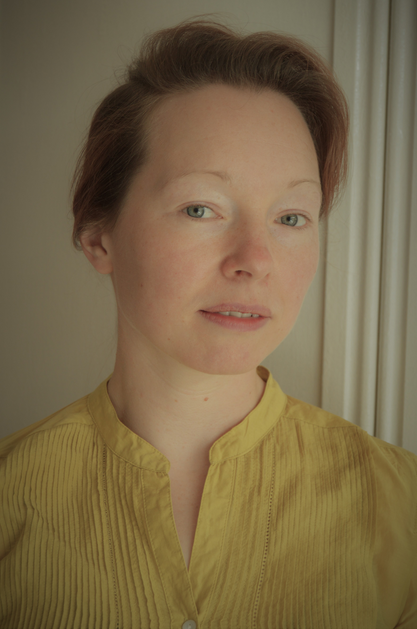

Academic work
- Discipline: Classics
- Sub-discipline: Late antiquity
- Institutions: Royal Holloway, University of London; Institute of Classical Studies

Victoria Leonard FRHistS is a British Classicist specialising in the study of religion, gender, and the body in Late antiquity. She was a Postdoctoral researcher at Royal Holloway, University of London, and is a Research Fellow at the Institute of Classical Studies. She holds a PhD from Cardiff University. Leonard was elected as a Fellow of the Royal Historical Society in July 2019.

She is a founding member and current steering committee member of the Women's Classical Committee UK, a group who aim to support women in Classics, promote feminist and gender-informed perspectives in Classics, raise the profile of the study of women in antiquity and Classical reception, and advance equality and diversity in Classics.

== Select bibliography ==
- Leonard, V. 2011. "Nefarious Acts and Sacrilegious Sacrifices: Live Burial in the Historia adversus paganos", in Alberto, J. Quiroga Puertas (ed) Hierà kaì lógoi. Estudios de literatura y de religión en la Antigüedad Tardía. 395–411.
- Leonard, V. June 2016. "How we doubled the representation of female classical scholars on Wikipedia", Times Higher Education.
- Leonard, V. 2017. "The Origin of Zealous Intolerance: Paulus Orosius and Violent Religious Conflict in the Early Fifth Century", Vigiliae Christianae 71(3), 261–284.
- Leonard, V. December 2018. "Female scholars are marginalised on Wikipedia because it's written by men", The Guardian
- Leonard, V. 2019. "Galla Placidia as ‘Human Gold’: Consent and Autonomy in the Sack of Rome, CE 410", Gender and History 31(2), 334–352. doi:10.1111/1468-0424.12423
- Leonard, V. and Bond, S. 2019. "Advancing Feminism Online: Online Tools, Visibility, and Women in Classics", Studies in Late Antiquity 3(1), 4–16. doi:10.1525/sla.2019.3.1.4
- Leonard, V. and J. Wood. 2020. "History-writing and Education in Late Antique and Early Medieval Iberia", in Heydemann, G., and Reimitz, H. (eds) Historiography and Identity II: Post-Roman Multiplicity and New Political Identities. Belgium: Brepols, pp. 237–67
- Leonard, V. 2020. "The Ideal (Bleeding?) Female: Hypatia of Alexandria and Distorting Patriarchal Narratives", in LaValle Norman, D., and Petkas, A. (eds) Hypatia of Alexandria: Her Context and Legacy. Mohr Siebeck. 171–192.
- Bradley, M., Leonard, V., and Totelin, L. (eds) 2021. Bodily Fluids in Antiquity. Routledge.
- Leonard, V. 2022. In Defiance of History: Orosius and the Unimproved Past. Routledge.
- Leonard, V. 2023. 'Gendered Violence, Victim Credibility and Adjudicating Justice in Augustine’s Letters'. Transactions of the Royal Historical Society. 2023;1:219-239. doi:10.1017/S0080440123000087
- Leonard, V. 2025. ‘Dividing the Later Roman Empire: Methodologies, Problems and Effects’, Brill’s Companion to Roman Prosopography, ed. by Richard Flower, Marietta Horster, Frédéric Hurlet and Ralph W. Mathisen (Leiden: Brill) 443-59
- Leonard, V., E. Manzo and C. Wachowich (eds) 2025, Orosius Through the Ages, Special Issue Bulletin of the Institute of Classical Studies (BICS) 0076-0730
