= Cippus Abellanus =

Stone slab inscribed in the Oscan language

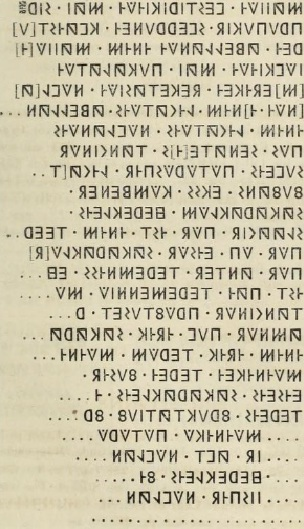
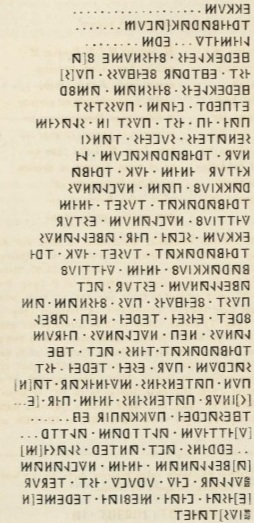
- Side A Side B Text of the Cippus Abellanus
- Material: stone
- Height: 192 centimetres (76 in)
- Width: 55 centimetres (22 in)
- Writing: Oscan script
- Created: c. 150 BCE
- Discovered: 1745; Avella
- Language: Oscan language

The Cippus Abellanus is a stone slab inscribed in the Oscan language. It is one of the most important examples of the Oscan language along with the Tabula Bantina.

The Cippus Abellanus is part of the collection of the History and Archaeology Museum of Nola in Nola, Italy.

== Discovery ==
The Cippus Abellanus was discovered on the site of the ancient town of Abella (now Avella) in 1745, being used as a base for a door.

== Description ==
The Cippus Abellanus is a limestone tablet 192 cm high (~ six feet) high by 55 cm wide and 27 cm thick. The engraved letters are 3.5 cm high on average. The date likely some time in the 2nd century BCE, probably around 150. These inscriptions use the Etruscan alphabet.

Cippus Abellanus is an agreement marking the limits between the cities of Abella and Nola around a temple dedicated to Heracles.

== Text ==
Side A

maiiúí vestirikiíúí mai(eís) sta(ttieís)
prupukid sverruneí kvaístu-
reí abellanúí, íním maiiúí
lúvkiíúí mai(eís) pakalatúí
[m]edíkeí deketasiúí núvl[a]
[núí], íním lígatúís abellan[úís]
íním lígatúís núvlanúís,
pús senateís tanginúd
suveís pútúrúspíd ligat[ús]
fufans, ekss kúmbened [am-?]

sakaraklúm herekleís [ú]p
slaagid púd íst, íním teer[úm]
púd úp eísúd sakaraklúd [íst],
púd anter teremníss eh[......]
íst, paí teremenniú mú[íníkad]
tanginúd prúftú set r[...5-6...]
amnúd, puz ídík sakar[aklúm]
íním ídík terúm múín[íkúm]
múíníkeí tereí fusíd, [íním]
eíseís sakarakleís [íním]
tere[í]s fruktatiuf múíníkú pútúrú[mpid]
[fus]íd. avt núvlan[úm es-]
[tud] herekleís fí[isnaíen dún-]

[úm p]íspíd núvlan[ús ....]
[...] íp p[...]ís [..........]

Side B

ekkum [svaí píd íússu íp]
trííbarak [avum hereset ant]
líimítú[m h]ernúm, [puf]
herekleís fíisnú mefi[ú]
íst, ehtrad feíhúss pú[s]
herekieís fiísnam amfr-
et pert víam pússtís,
paí íp íst pústin slagím,
senateís suveís tangi-
núd tríbarakavúm lí-/kitud.

íním íúk tríba-
rakkiuf pam núvlanús
tríbarakattuset íním
úíttiuf núvlanúm estud.

ekkum svaí píd abellanús
tríbarakattuset íúk trí-
barakkiuf íním úíttiuf
abellanúm estud.
avt
púst feíhúís pús fisnam am-
fret eíseí tercí nep abel-
lanús nep núvlanús pídum
tríbarakattins.
avt the-
savrúm púd e<í>seí tereí íst
pún patensíns máíníkad t[an]-
[g]ínúd patensíns; íním píd e[íseí]
thesavreí púkkapíd ee[stit]
[a]íttíúm alttram alttr[ús] /[h]erríns.

avt anter slag[ím]
[a]bellanam íním núvlanam
[s]ullad víú uruvú íst pedú(m) x[+?].
[e]ísaí víaí mefìaí tereme[n]-
[n]iú staíet.

== Translations ==
=== From Buck (1904) ===
Side A (numbers indicate lines)

1-10. Agreed as follows between the quaestor of Abella-- Majus Vestiricius (son) of Majus Statius, the previously agreed upon spokesman (sveruni)--and the meddix of Nola--Majus Luius (son) of Majus Paclatus--and the delegates of Abella and Nola, appointed by their respective senates:

11-23. That the temple (sakaraklum) of Hercules, which is on the border (slaagid) (between Abella and Nola), and the adjacent land within the outer boundaries which have been set around, be held in common, and the income from them be joint income of both cities.

Side B

27-48. If any one wishes (svai pid herieset) to erect a building on the land in front of the temple limits, outside the wall running about the fane (fiisnu) and across the road, it may be done with the sanction of the senate under whose jurisdiction the land falls.

If the Nolans build, the building and its income shall belong to them; to the inhabitants of Abella, if they build.

But behind the wall surrounding the fane, no one shall erect a building.

48-54. When they open (pún patensíns) the treasury which is in this territory, they are to open it by common consent, and whatever is in the treasury they are to share.

54-58. The boundary-stones are on the road between the territory of Abella and that of Nola."

=== From Pulgram ===
Side A (numbers indicate sections/paragraphs)

1. Maius Vestricius, (son of) Maius ?, designated (?) quaestor of Abella, and Maius Lucius, (son of) Maius ?, meddix of Nola, and the deputies of Abella, and the deputies of Nola, who by the decision of their senate [i. e., of their respective senates] were (fufans) deputies of either side, thus agreed [literally: To Maius Vestricius . . . it was thus suitable]:

2: The sanctuary (sakaraklum) of Hercules which lies by [i. e., amidst, athwart] the dividing line (slaagid)[separating the townships of Nola and Abella], and the land which lies by [i. e., amidst, inside] this sanctuary and which lies between [i. e., within] the external (?) boundaries, which boundaries are approved by common decision, ? so that this sanctuary and this common land should lie within land, and that the usufruct of this sanctuary and the usufruct of this land should be common of [i. e., belong to] both sides.

3: But the Nolans . . . the temple of Hercules, whatever

Nolan.

Side B

Likewise, if either party shall wish to build up to the boundaries where the temple of Hercules stands in the center, [albeit] outside the walls which surround the temple (fiisnu) of Hercules [and] which stand up to the path, which there is according to [i. e., follows] the dividing line, then let it be permitted to build [there] according to the decision of the senate of either concerned party.

5: And this building which the Nolans will have built shall also be [for] the use of the Nolans. Likewise, if the Abellans will have built anything, this building shall also be [for] the use of the Abellans.

6: But beyond [i. e., inside] the walls which surround the temple, on that land let neither the Abellans nor the Nolans build anything.

7: But the treasure, which is on this land, when they open it, let them open it by common decision, and whatever is contained in this treasure, let one side receive the other of the shares [i. e., let each side receive a share]. ?

8: But along the dividing line, wherever the path, ploughed, [i. e., the path bearing or continuing the plough-marked township boundary; or: ... wherever the path, the boundary . . .] is ten feet [wide], in the center of the path i.e, the township boundaries.

== Notes ==
Note that Pulgrum sakaraklum as "sanctuary," that is the entire temple compound or sacred area, while fiisnu is the building of the temple itself.

While most scholars take fufans in line 10 as a perfect of * fu < Proto-Indo-European *bʰuH- "be" plus a perfective ending from the same root, also seen in Latin -ba perfects such as da-ba-m "I was giving," Pizani analyzes this form as from PIE *b^{h}ud^{h}- "be aware, make aware" which in Western Indo-European developed meaning involving spoken agreements (or disagreements). So the meaning of the relevant phrase would be more like "the delegates from each side were provided with the power of attorney to negotiate."

The word slaagí- can mean either a boundary or the territory defined by that boundary. Joseph (1982) connects it etymologically with Greek le:go: "leave off, cease," from a substantization of the zero-grade abstract -i stem Proto-Indo-European *slH1g-i- meaning "the place where the territory leaves off or ceases."
