= Curse of Vibia =

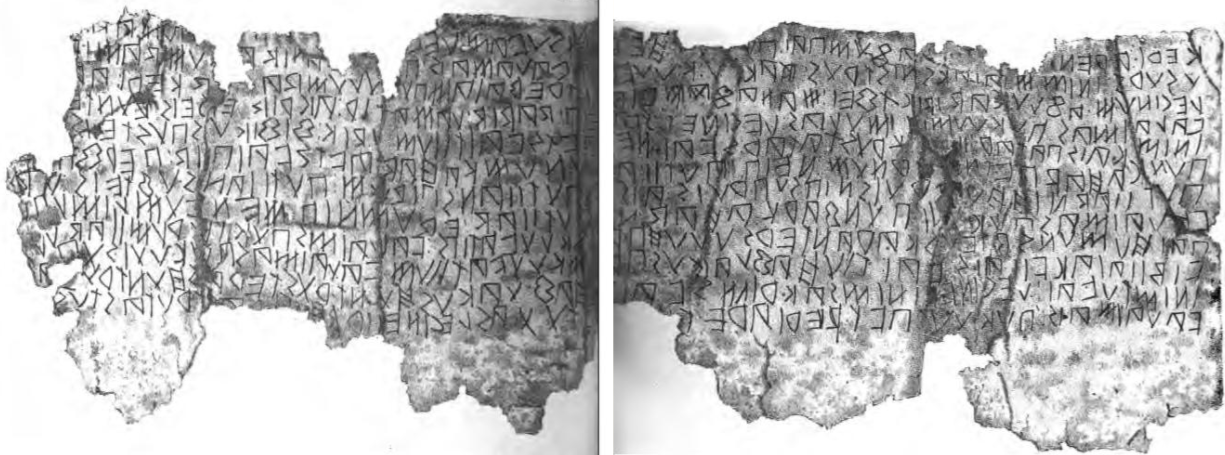
- Type: curse tablet
- Material: lead
- Size: about 0.22 by 0.08 metres (8.7 in × 3.1 in)
- Writing: Oscan language
- Created: 3rd-century BCE
- Discovered: 1876
- Place: Capua

The Curse of Vibia is an ancient inscription written in the Oscan language. It is one of the longest known Oscan texts. The inscription was first discovered in 1876 within the necropolis at the city of Capua. Following its discovery, the text was purchased by the classical archaeologist Friedrich von Duhn, who presented the artifact to the philologist Franz Bücheler.

== Description ==
The inscription was originally written on a rolled lead plate that, when unrolled, measures about 0.22 by 0.08 metres (8.7 in × 3.1 in) at the broadest part. The text consists of thirteen total lines all running right-to-left, twelve of which were written on one side of the tablet. These lines—which are each about 1/8 inch (0.32 cm) high—extend across the whole plate, leaving only about an inch of free space at the bottom. On the backside of the tablet, there is an additional single line that runs across the entire tablet. Much of the text is severely damaged: The top and bottom of the plate are fragmented, and the leftmost section of the text has also been completely broken off, forcing editors to judge the missing content based on attempted restorations. The tablet was originally rolled in such a way that the beginnings of the lines were placed near the center of the roll, thereby protecting them from the elements, yet also leaving the line ends more vulnerable. Consequently, the line ends have suffered significant damage from abrasion and corrosion over the centuries, rendering them illegible.

The inscription was written using a variant of the Oscan script, albeit carelessly, and with various peculiar features. For instance, it lacks the I with a side stroke ("𐌝"), and always writes the letter t as "," though it also often features more rectangular versions of certain letters, such as using "" instead of "." The inscription also does not include any double letters, containing words such as keri instead of kerrí, which is found in other Oscan texts. Moreover, it cannot be conclusively determined whether the text contained the U with a dot ("𐌞"); such letters might have existed once in the inscription, though the dot is in any case no longer visible, which has led most editors to unilaterally transcribe U in all instances. On the basis of the style of writing, the text likely dates back to the 3rd-century BCE, placing it amongst the earliest Oscan texts.

== Interpretation ==
The person responsible for inflicting the curse appears to be named Vibia Acuvia ("vibiiai akviiai"). Their last name, which in the Oscan script is rendered as akviiai, has been compared variously to Latin gentilicia Acuvia and Aquuia. According to the text of the inscription, the curser "sends" ("manafum," "I send") an individual named Pacius Clovatius, son of Valaima, to the underworld deity Keres Arentika ("keri arent[ikai]"). Alongside Keres, the curser invoked "her horde" ("ulas leginei"), presumably a group of other related deities. Collectively, these divine forces are directed to harm not just Pacius, but also others close to him, particularly the "usurs inim malaks nistrus." The translation of this exact sequence is controversial, though there is consensus that it does refer to the relatives of Pacuvius. However, whether the words "usurs inim malaks" mean "women and children" or "haters and malevolent (people)" is disputed. Within the opening lines, the author of the tablet includes the sequence paipu[i], a combination of pai—a feminine relative pronoun—and pui, a masculine pronoun. According to the philologist Carl Darling Buck, this particular sequence is stylistically comparable to the Latin phrase si deus si dea ("be they a god or a goddess").

In the following section of the text, the name Vibia ("Vibiiai") is mentioned, followed by the sequence Prebaiam. This sequence, Prebaiam, has received various interpretations: It has been compared to Latin praebia, a type of amulet described by Festus, in which case the overall sentence "vibiiai prebiam" might describe a type of apotropaic magic and could thus be translated as "protection for Vibia." Yet, linguistically speaking, an etymological connection between the Oscan and Latin term is difficult, as it requires that a Latin diphthong equate to Oscan E, which could only be explained provided that Oscan borrowed the word from a monophthongizing dialect. Moreover, this reading requires that the following sentence be reduced to only two words, which creates problems for its interpretation. Alternatively, the classicist Roland G. Kent interprets the word as the feminine form of a gentile name. According to another interpretation, the sequence Prebaiam ought to be split into Prebai and am, with the final am joined with the ensuing pu[z] to form a new word ampu[z]. Even if this version is accepted, the ultimate function of the individual Vibia Preba is unclear, though—according to the philologist Francesca Murano—she was probably an intermediary deity whose role is specifically to deliver the cursed individual to Keres.
