= Liz Gloyn =

Classicist

- Born: Elizabeth Gloyn; England
- Education: Newnham College; Cambridge; Rutgers
- Occupation: Scholar

Elizabeth Gloyn is a Reader in Latin Language and Literature at Royal Holloway, the University of London and a Senior Fellow of the Higher Education Academy. Her research focuses on the intersection between Latin literature, ancient philosophy (particularly Stoicism) and gender studies; as well as topics of classical reception, and the history of women in the field of Classics.

== Education and career ==
Gloyn completed her BA and MPhil at Newnham College Cambridge, and received a PhD from Rutgers (the State University of New Jersey) in 2011.

Between 2011 and 2013, she was a Teaching Fellow at the University of Birmingham, before moving to Royal Holloway. Prior to her current appointment as Reader in Latin Languages and Literature in 2020, Gloyn acted as a Lecturer (2013–2018) and a Senior Lecturer at Royal Holloway.

Gloyn is also a founding member of the Women's Classical Committee UK and served as Administrator from 2015 to 2022; and an Editorial Consultant for the online Companion to The Worlds of Roman Women. She was a trustee of the Classical Association from 2017 to 2022.

== Research and select publications ==
According to Gloyn, her research interests are "pretty broad". She has published widely on topics including Seneca the Younger, classical reception, the history of Classics, and issues of social and familial history within Latin literature more broadly.

She is the author of two books:

- (2019) Tracking Classical Monsters in Popular Culture, London: Bloomsbury Academic.
- (2017) The Ethics of the Family in Seneca, Cambridge: Cambridge University Press.

Her other recent publications include:

- (2019) "We Are What We Keep: The 'Family Archive', Identity and Public/Private Heritage", with Anna Woodham, Laura King, Vicky Crewe and Fiona Blair. Heritage & Society.
- (2018) "The Ties That Bind: Materiality, Identity and the Life Course in the 'Things' Families Keep", with Anna Woodham, Laura King and Vicky Crewe. Journal of Family History 43.2: 157–176.
- (2016) "This Is Not A Chapter About Jane Harrison: Classicists at Newnham College, 1882–1922". In Women Classical Scholars. Unsealing the Fountain from the Renaissance to Jacqueline de Romilly, eds. E. Hall and R. Wyles. Oxford University Press: 153–175.
- (2014) "Show Me The Way To Go Home: A Reconsideration of Seneca's De Consolatione ad Polybium". The American Journal of Philology135.3: 451-480.
- (2013) "Reading Rape in Ovid's Metamorphoses: A Test-Case Lesson". Classical World 106.4: 676–681.

Alongside her academic research, Gloyn also writes and publishes in non-traditional formats, including her personal blog entitled 'Classically Inclined'. Publications of this kind include:

- (2019) 'Invisible barriers keep many academics from the media', WonkHE.
- (2016) 'Seneca's Guide To Relaxing.' Iris Online.

== Media and public engagement ==
Gloyn has featured in the following print, radio, podcast, and television broadcasts:

- (2019) Guest interviewee on 'Woman's Hour', BBC Radio 4, interviewed by Jane Garvey.
- (2019) 'Talking head' for Monsters are Real documentary-short, released as a featurette on the DVD of Godzilla: King of Monsters (Warner Bros.).
- (2019) Guest interviewee on The History of Ancient Greece Podcast.
- (2019) Guest interviewee on The Endless Knot.
- (2018) Interviewed about Stoicism for episode 2 of BBC 4's Hacking Happiness ('Self-Harm Nation').
- (2017) 'Talking head' for five episodes of Myths and Monsters, a television series for 3DD Productions; released on Netflix UK/US/Canada on 23 December 2017.
- (2016) Interviewed for article in the Independent, 'Why do bridesmaids all dress the same?', on Roman marriage traditions.

Gloyn has also spoken at several public events, including:

- (2018) "Lessons in Stoic Leadership from Seneca", Stoicon 2018, London.
- (2018) "Do Fictional Monsters Reflect Our Reality?", The Royal Institution, London.
