= Ain Zana =

Coordinates: 36°24′02″N 8°11′28″E

- Commune and town
- Country: Algeria
- Province: Souk Ahras Province
- Time zone: UTC+1 (CET)

Ain Zana (Aïn-Zana) is a town and commune in Souk Ahras Province in north-eastern Algeria. It is the site of Diana Veteranorum, a former ancient city and bishopric in Numidia. It is now the Latin Catholic titular see, Diana.

== History ==
Diana was important enough in the Roman province of Numidia to become one of the many suffragan bishoprics no later than mid third century AD, yet was to fade.

=== Titular see ===
The diocese was nominally restored in 1933 as a Latin titular bishopric.

It has had the following incumbents, all of the lowest (episcopal) rank :

- Thomaz Franciszek Czapski, Cistercians (O. Cist.) (1726.07.01 – 1730.12.06)
- Hugh MacDonald (1731.02.12 – 1773.03.12)
- Andreas Stanislaus von Hattynski (1800.08.11 – 1837.10.02)
- Daniel Latussek (1838.02.12 – 1857.08.17)
- Félix Biet (畢天榮), Paris Foreign Missions Society (M.E.P.) (1878.07.23 – 1901.09.09)
- Charles-Eugène Parent (1944.03.11 – 1951.03.02) as Auxiliary Bishop of Rimouski (1944.03.11 – 1951.03.02), succeeded as Metropolitan Archbishop of Rimouski (Canada) (1951.03.02 – 1967.02.25), emeritate as Titular Archbishop of Vassinassa (1967.02.25 – 1970.11.26)
- Gérard Mongeau, Missionary Oblates of Mary Immaculate (O.M.I.) (1951.03.27 – 1976.06.12) as Bishop-Prelate of the Territorial Prelature of Cotabato (1951.03.27 – 1976.06.12), promoted first suffragan Bishop of Cotabato (Philippines) (1976.06.12 – 1979.11.05), promoted first Metropolitan Archbishop of Cotabato (1979.11.05 – 1980.03.14)
- Jacques Louis Léon Delaporte (1976.06.22 – 1980.03.25) as Auxiliary Bishop of Nancy (France) (1976.06.22 – 1980.03.25); later Metropolitan Archbishop of Cambrai (France) (1980.03.25 – 1999.11.21)
- Raymond Saint-Gelais (1980.07.05 – 1988.02.19)
- Marcel Germain Perrier (1988.04.15 – 2000.05.16)
- Alfonso Milián Sorribas (2000.11.09 – 2004.11.11)
- Pierre-André Fournier (2005.02.11 – 2008.07.03) as Auxiliary Bishop of Québec (Canada) (2005.02.11 – 2008.07.03); later Metropolitan Archbishop of Rimouski (Canada) (2008.07.03 – 2015.01.10)
- Thomas Löhr (2009.06.15 – ...), Auxiliary Bishop of Limburg (Germany)

== Sources and external links ==
- GCatholic with titular incumbent biography links
