= Avella =

- Comune
- Comune di Avella
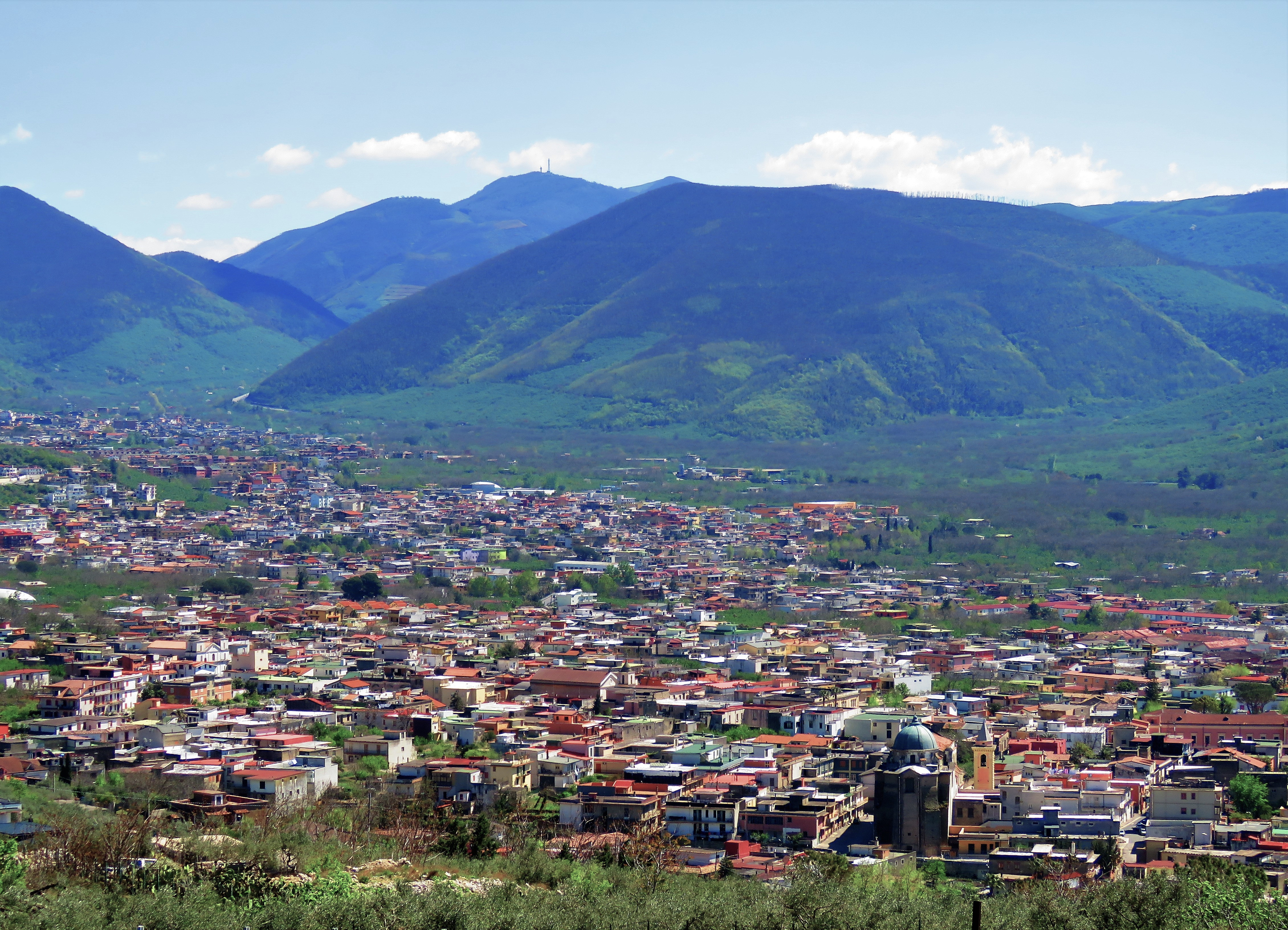

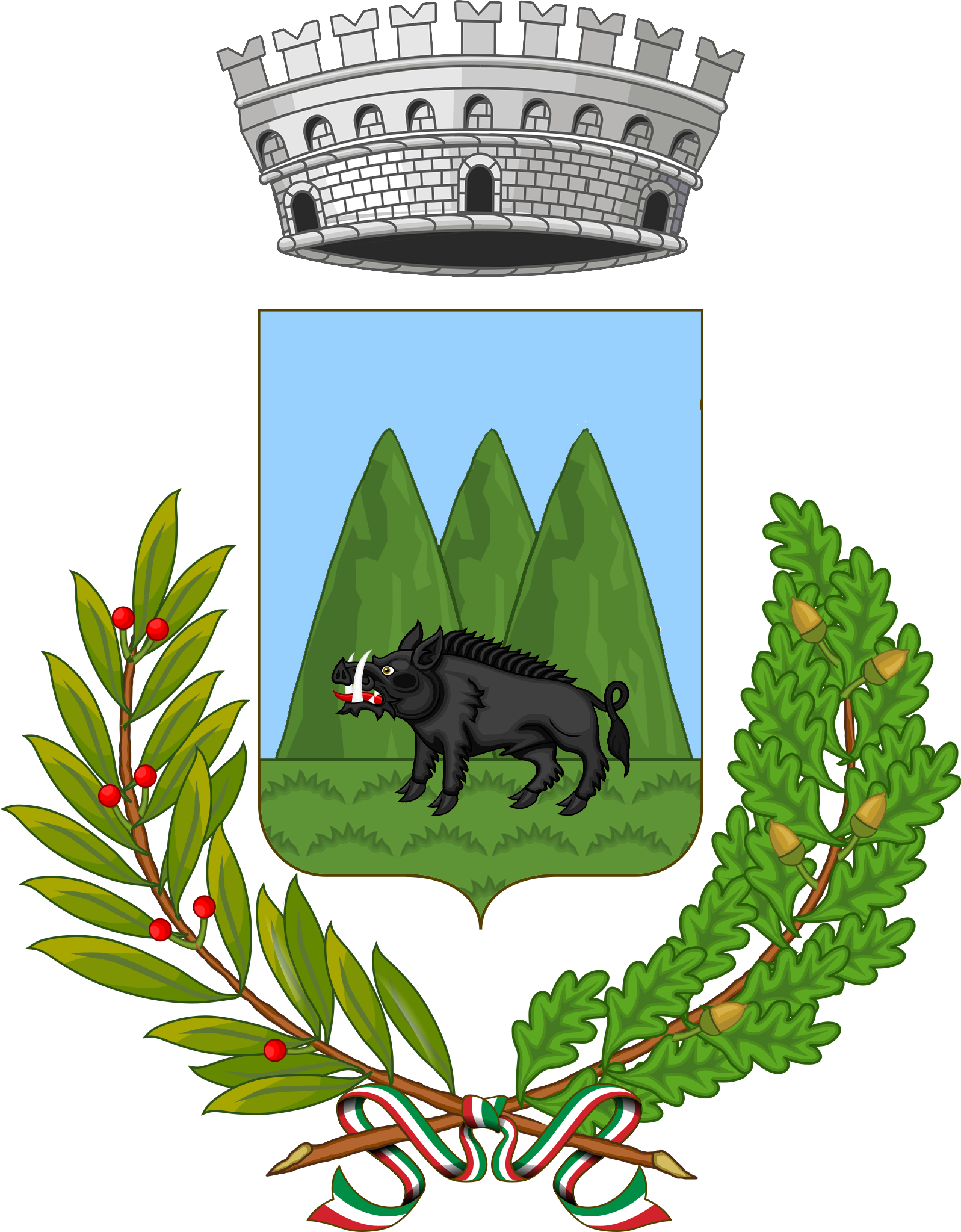
- Coat of arms

- Location within Italy Location within Campania
- Coordinates: 40°57′36″N 14°36′5″E
- Country: Italy
- Region: Campania
- Province: Avellino (AV)

Area
  - Total: 29.39 km^{2} (11.35 sq mi)

Population (2018-01-01)
  - Total: 7,810
  - Density: 266/km^{2} (688/sq mi)
- Time zone: UTC+1 (CET)
  - Summer (DST): UTC+2 (CEST)
- Patron saint: Saint Sebastian
- Saint day: 20 January
- Website: www.comune.avella.av.it

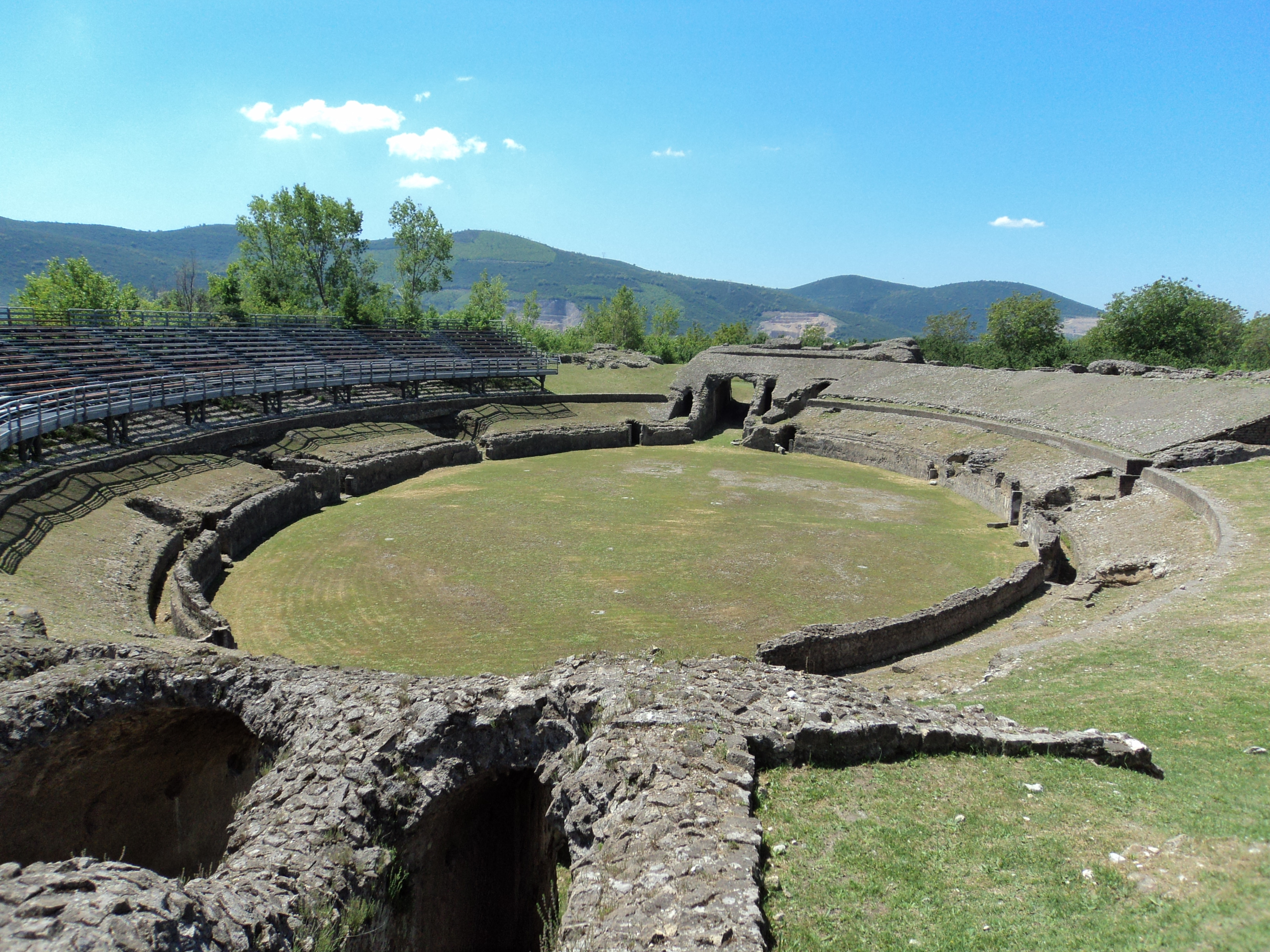
Roman amphitheatre

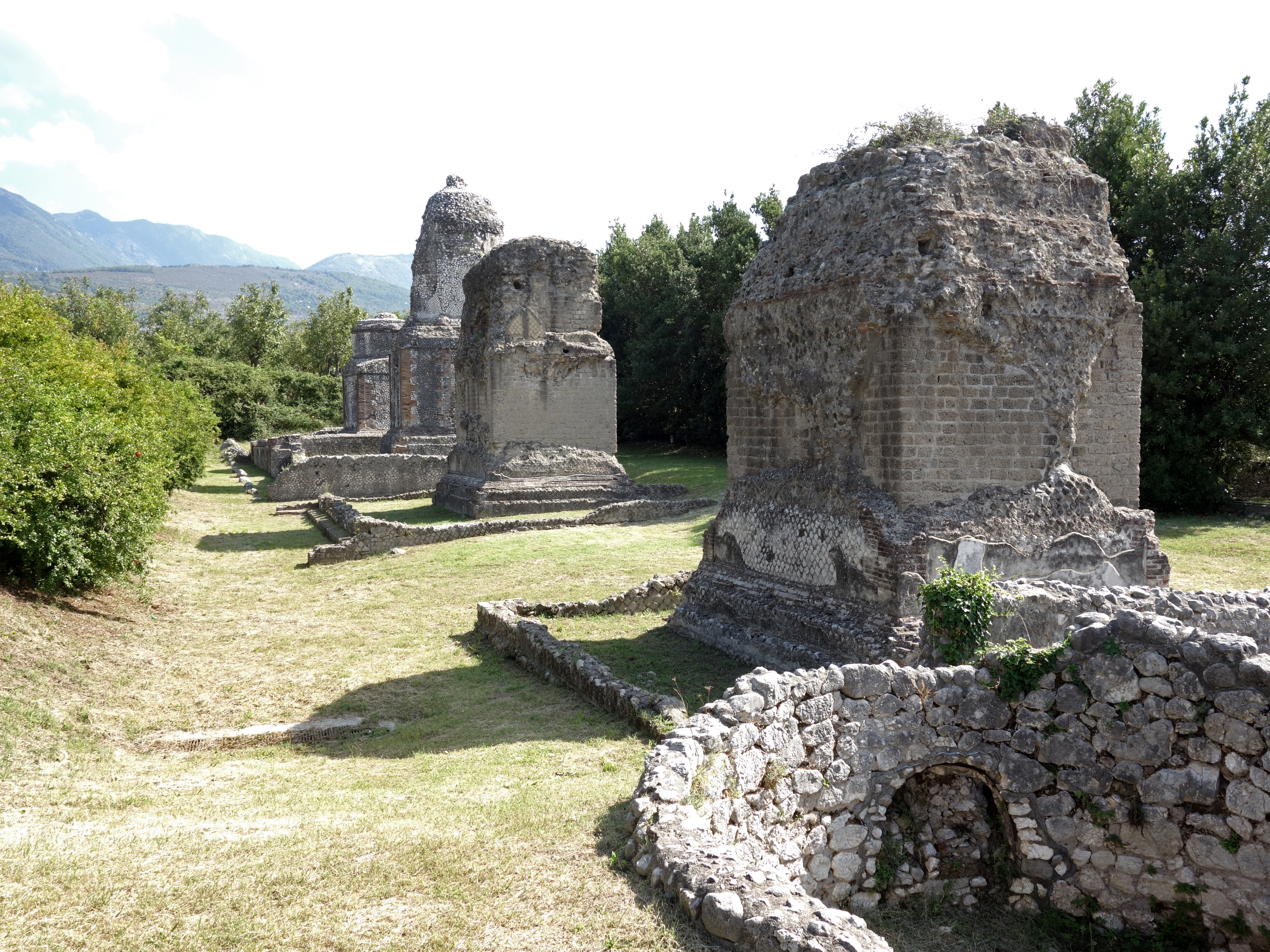
Roman tombs

Avella is a town and comune in the province of Avellino, Campania, southern Italy. It is renowned for the cultivation of hazelnuts, whose specific name (Corylus avellana) derives precisely from this territory.

== Etymology ==
Could be related to the Indo-European root *h₂ebōl, *h₂ebl (apple), meaning "place where apple-orchards originated" (read below).

== History ==
The ancient Abella, whose inhabited area partly coincided in Samnites and Roman times with the more eastern of the two nuclei of the current historic center, was important among the medium-small centers of Ancient Campania, even if surpassed in importance and size from nearby Nola. In pre-Roman period the region was dominated by the Osci. An important ancient inscription in Oscan was found in Avella, the Cippus Abellanus, which records an agreement between Abella and Nola with regards to the use of land around a temple to Hercules that was situated on the border between the two municipalities.

A considerable number of tombs from the "recent orientalising period" (650-545 BC approximately) have been found both in the necropolis to the north-east (locality of S. Paolino and adjacent areas) and to the west of the ancient city (locality S. Nazzaro). The tombs are simple grave inhumations and often contained rich grave goods with local ceramics and imported vessels. Contrary to nearby Nola, where ceramics are prevalent, bucchero and imitations of Corinthian vases are prominent in this period, with the same shapes as found in Capua which seems to confirm the Etruscan character of the city.

From the 5th c. BC Abella was, like the rest of the region, under the Samnite hegemony and later assumed the character of a city, as evidenced by the remains of houses found north of the amphitheatre. The urban area (about half of Pompeii) occupied a slightly elevated area south of the river and was often affected by floods from the mountains.

=== Roman Avella ===
The walls have a regular layout throughout the eastern half and the only well-preserved part, incorporated in the amphitheatre, is in concrete with an opus incertum facing, with irregular blocks of various sizes, dated after the second Punic war of the 2nd century BC.

The town was destroyed by Sulla in the Social War in 87 BC and he then made it a colonia for his veterans. Proof of this is the division of the land for the settlers (centuriation) in the flat part of the territory which is the continuation of that of the Nola area and of which some of the roads have been preserved. In fact, three decumani in the east-west direction and eight cardines in the north-south direction are recognisable, which delimited squares of 715 m on each side (centuriae) made up of one hundred parcels.

The orthogonal urban plan seems to have been regularised after the destruction. Public buildings were built from the late Republican age and private ones were rebuilt in peripheral areas such as adjacent to the amphitheatre. Vegetable gardens took over instead of houses, indicating a town without major economic activities beyond agriculture and livestock. The villae rusticae nearby were the centres of large estates (latifundia) managed using slaves.

From the Liber de Coloniis Vespasian settled a number of his freedmen and dependants there, yet it appears, both from that treatise and from Pliny, that it had not then attained the rank of a colony, a dignity which we find it enjoying in the time of Trajan. It probably became such in the reign of that emperor.

Virgil and Silius Italicus considered that its territory was not fertile in corn, but rich in fruit-trees (maliferae Abellae): the neighbourhood also abounded in filberts or hazelnuts of a very choice quality, which were called from thence nuces Avellanae. By antonomasia, the namesake in Italian came to define hazelnuts in general.

In the late empire, Abella seems to have gradually dissolved as a city following invasions, such as that of Alaric I who destroyed Nola.

=== Later era ===
As in ancient times, even during the Middle Ages Avella continued to remain linked to the Nolan area and more precisely to the Terra di Lavoro. It was only after 1860 that the municipality of Avella was aggregated to the Province of Avellino, although its territory did not belong to ancient Irpinia.

== Main sights ==
The modern town of Avella is situated in the plain near the foot of the Apennines; but the remains of the ancient city, still called Avella Vecchia, occupy a hill of considerable height, forming one of the underfalls of the mountains, and command an extensive view of the plain beneath; hence Virgil's expression despectant moenia Abellae. The ruins at one time were extensive, including the vestiges of an amphitheatre, a temple, and other edifices, as well as a portion of the ancient walls.

A long inscription in the Oscan language records a treaty between Abella and Nola. It dates (according to Mommsen) from a period shortly after the Second Punic War, and is not only curious on account of details concerning the municipal magistrates, but is one of the most important documents for study of the Oscan language.

In the area of the "Santissimo" are imposing vaults of probably a public building perhaps related to the forum in the vicinity of the church of S. Pietro.

In the territory, various funerary monuments of the late Republican age and of the first century of the empire, belonging to the Ordus family coming from villas in the hills and along the roads that came out of the city.

An image of Lucius Sitrius Modestus has long been walled up on the facade of the church of S. Pietro dating to the Tiberian era.

Evidence of a Christian cult building of a cemetery character are near Saint Paulinus of Nola, perhaps built or restored when he was bishop of Nola.

Nearby is the Grotto of the Camerelle di Pianura, a Karst grotto. Medieval sights include the church of Santi Martiri Nazario e Celso, built in the 9th to 11th centuries

=== Amphitheatre ===
The amphitheatre was built opus reticulatum of tuff perhaps not long after becoming a colonia. It roughly traces the dimensions of that of Pompeii.

It was located on the south-eastern corner of the walls and partly on a natural slope, only the southern part rests on large vaults, while the arena is below ground level. The two main vomitoria on the major axis of the ellipse (itinera magna) with side rooms, the podium that divided the curve from the arena, and the tuff seats are all well preserved. A schematic image of the building is found on the side of an honorary base from the imperial age. In the late empire, the construction of stables on the podium began, which was then interrupted by the events of dissolution of the Western Roman Empire.

== Transportation ==
Avella has a station on the Circumvesuviana line Naples Porta Nolana-Baiano.
