= Helen Lovatt =

Scholar of Latin literature

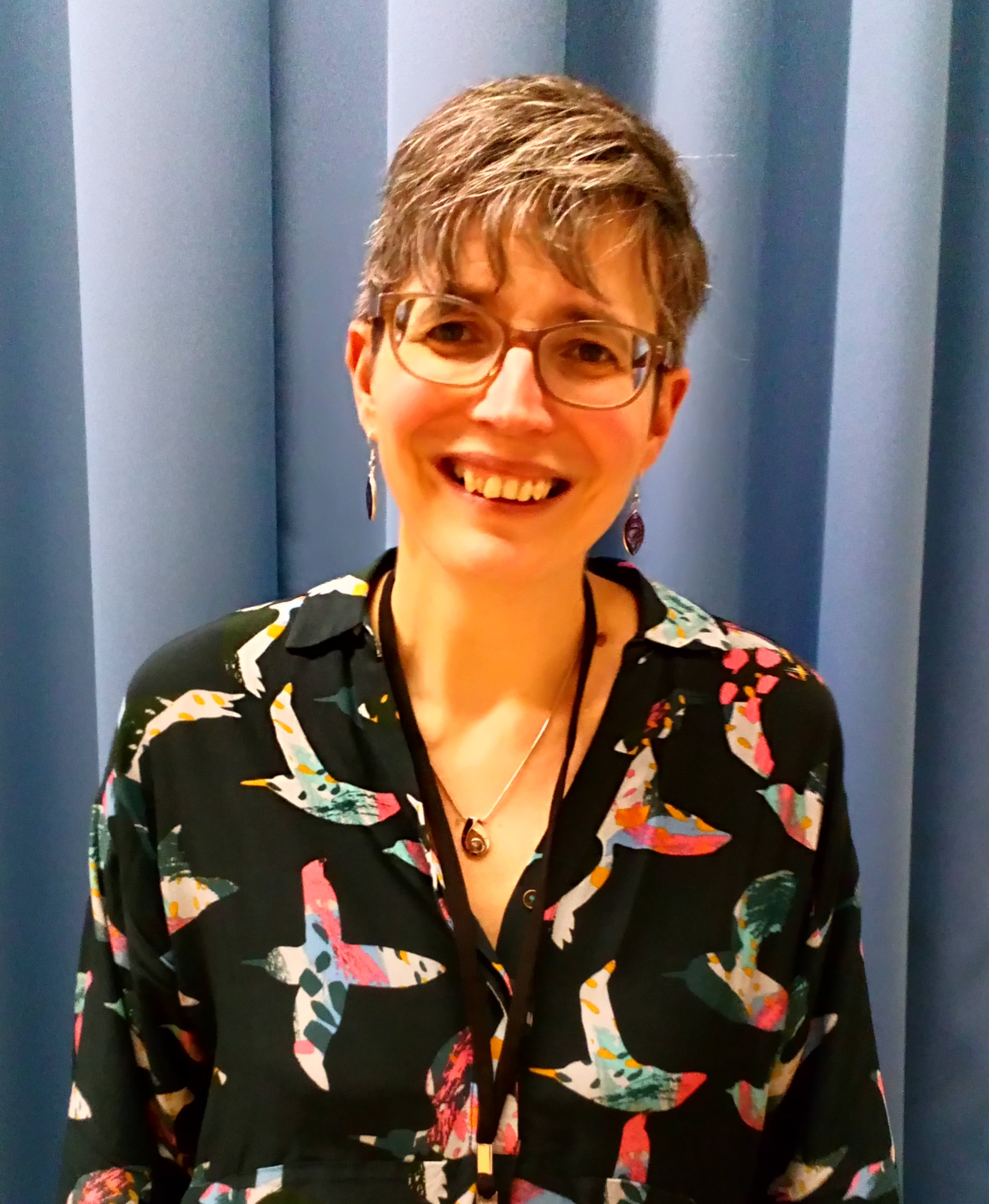

Academic background
- Education: University of Cambridge
- Thesis: Games and realities in Statius, 'Thebaid 6' (2000)
- Doctoral advisor: J. G. W. Henderson

Academic work
- Discipline: Classics
- Institutions: University of Nottingham

Helen V. Lovatt is Professor of Classics at the University of Nottingham. She is known in particular for her work on Latin epic literature especially from the Flavian period.

== Career ==
Lovatt studied at Millfield and then read Classics at Pembroke College, Cambridge, where she was awarded her PhD in 2000 with a dissertation on Games and realities in Statius, 'Thebaid 6'. Lovatt lectured at Keele University before moving to a Junior Research Fellowship at Murray Edwards College, Cambridge. In 2003 Lovatt joined the department of Classics at the University of Nottingham. Lovatt delivered her inaugural lecture as Professor of Classics, Epic Journeys, on 15 February 2017.

Lovatt's PhD work on the athletic games in Statius' Thebaid was published as Statius and Epic Games: Sport, Politics and Poetics in the Thebaid (Cambridge University Press, 2005). In the book, Lovatt interpreted Statius' work as a microcosm of the whole epic tradition. More recently, Lovatt has worked on the epic tradition in both Latin and Greek literature, publishing a book on vision in epic from Homer to Nonnus, The Epic Gaze: Vision, Gender and Narrative in Ancient Epic (Cambridge University Press, 2013) and a co-edited work Epic Visions (Cambridge University Press, 2013) with Caroline Vout which resulted from a conference in Nottingham in 2003.

Lovatt currently works on classical reception, particularly in detective and children's literature, resulting in her co-edited volume Classical Reception and Children's Literature: Greece, Rome and Childhood Transformation (I. B. Tauris, 2018) with Owen Hodkinson following a conference on the subject at the University of Wales, Lampeter in 2009.

== Selected publications ==
- (2018) ed. with Owen Hodkinson Classical Reception and Children's Literature: Greece, Rome and Childhood Transformation (I. B. Tauris)
- (2016) Flavian Spectacle: Paradox and Wonder. In: ZISSOS, A., ed., A Companion to the Flavian Age of Imperial Rome Blackwell. 361–75.
- (2015) Following after Valerius: Argonautic moments in Statius’ Thebaid. In: DOMINIK, W.J., GERVAIS, K. and NEWLANDS, C., eds., Brill's Companion to Statius Brill. 408–24.
- (2013) The epic gaze: vision, gender and narrative in ancient epic (Cambridge University Press).
- (2013) ed. with Caroline Vout Epic visions: visuality in Greek and Latin epic and its reception (Cambridge University Press).
- (2007) Statius, Orpheus, and the post-Augustan vates. Arethusa, 40(2), 145–163.
- (2006) The female gaze in Flavian epic: looking out from the walls in Valerius Flaccus and Statius. In Nauta, Ruurd Robijn; Dam, Harm-Jan Van; Smolenaars, Johannes Jacobus Louis (eds.) Flavian Poetry (pp. 59–78). BRILL.
- (2005) Statius and epic games: sport, politics and poetics in the Thebaid (Cambridge University Press).
- (2001) Mad about Winning: Epic, War and Madness in the Games of Statius' Thebaid. Materiali e discussioni per l'analisi dei testi classici, (46), 103–120.
- (1999) Competing Endings: Re-Reading the End of the Thebaid Through Lucan. Ramus, 28(2), 126–151.
