= Katherine McDonald =

British linguist and epigrapher

Katherine McDonald is a British linguist and epigrapher studying the languages of pre-Roman Italy. She has written extensively on language contact and the history of multilingualism in ancient Mediterranean. She is currently an Associate Professor of Classics and Ancient History at Durham University.

She attained a PhD at Pembroke College, Cambridge. She was previously an Affiliated Lecturer at the Faculty of Classics, Cambridge, and a Lecturer in Classics and Ancient History at University of Exeter.

In 2024, she was awarded the Philip Leverhulme Prize for outstanding research in Classical Studies. With this funding, she has begun a project titled "The Linguistics of Roman Slavery".

== Selected publications ==
- Italy Before Rome: A Sourcebook. Routledge, 2022.
- "The dedications to Reitia and the epigraphic visibility of women in Este and the Veneto". In E. Dupraz, & M. J. Estarán Tolosa (Eds.), Des mot pour les dieus. Dédicaces cultuelles dans les langues indigènes de la Mediterranée occidentale. Peter Lang, 2021.
- "Language and psychology". In D. Wharton (Ed.), A Cultural History of Color in Antiquity. Bloomsbury, 2021.
- Migration, Mobility and Language Contact in and around the Ancient Mediterranean (editor). Cambridge, 2020.
- Oscan in Southern Italy and Sicily. Cambridge, 2015.

== See also ==
- Testament of Vibius Adiranus
