= Tabula Bantina =

- Tabula Bantina
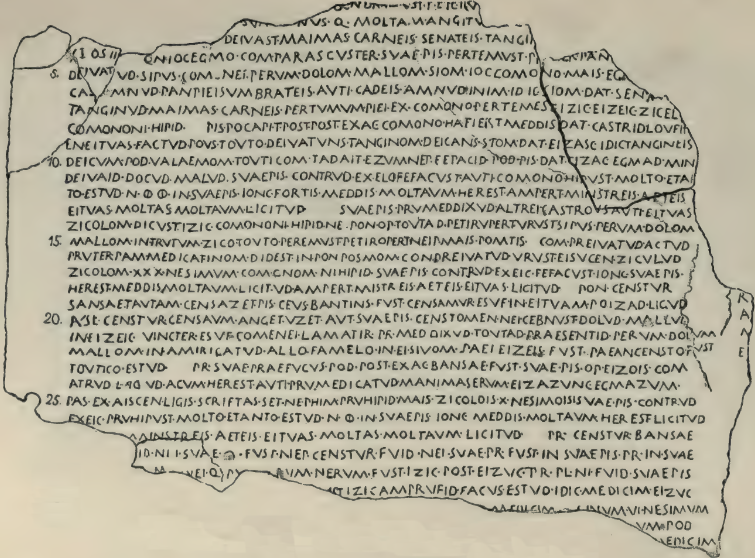
- Facsimile of the Oscan side of the Tabula Bantina.
- Material: bronze
- Discovered: 1790; Monte Montrone, Oppido Lucano
- Present location: Naples Archaeological Museum
- Language: Oscan, Latin

The Tabula Bantina (Latin for "Tablet from Bantia") is a bronze tablet and one of the major sources for ancient Oscan, an extinct Indo-European language closely related to Latin. It was discovered in 1790 near Banzi (known as "Bantia" in antiquity), in the Italian region of Basilicata. It now may be found in the Naples Archaeological Museum.

Another piece of this broken bronze tablet, Fragment Adamesteano, shows a hole that a nail went through that affixed the tablet to a wall. The patterns of writing around this hole on each side helped to determine that the Latin side was the original, and that the other side of the already inscribed tablet was then put to use for the Oscan inscription. It was discovered by Mario Torelli in 1967, and it appears to be the bottom part of the original piece. It now resides in the Venosa National Archaeological Museum.

== Discovery ==
The tablet was found in 1790 on the hill Monte Montrone, in the territory of Oppido Lucano (province of Potenza), among the finds from an ancient tomb. It consists of a sheet of bronze in three larger pieces and some smaller fragments. It likely dates between 150 and 100 BCE and is inscribed on both sides.

== Contents ==
On one side of the tablet is inscribed a municipal law from the city of Bantia, written in Oscan with Latin characters and 33 lines long, as it is preserved, broken into six paragraphs. On the other side is written a Roman plebiscite in Latin. The Latin text may have been the original one, and the tablet later re-used for the Oscan inscription.

Many details of the Oscan legal language suggest influence from Latin legal formulas.

The Oscan text probably dates from around the late 2nd or early 1st century BCE, like sometime around close to the Social War.

== From the text ==
=== First paragraph ===
Lines 3-8 (the first couple lines are too damaged to be clearly legible).

In Oscan:

(3) ...deiuast maimas carneis senateis tanginud am ... (4) XL osiins, pon ioc egmo comparascuster. Suae pis pertemust, pruter pan ... (5) deiuatud sipus comenei, perum dolum malum, siom ioc comono mais egmas touti- (6)cas amnud pan pieisum brateis auti cadeis amnud; inim idic siom dat senates (7) tanginud maimas carneis pertumum. Piei ex comono pertemest, izic eizeic zicelei (8) comono ni hipid.

In English:

(3) ...he shall take oath with the assent of the majority of the senate, provided that not less than (4) 40 are present, when the matter is under advisement. If anyone by right of intercession shall prevent the assembly, before preventing it, (5) he shall swear wittingly in the assembly without guile, that he prevents this assembly rather for the sake of the public welfare, (6) rather than out of favor or malice toward anyone; and that too in accordance with the judgment of the majority of the senate. The presiding magistrate whose assembly is prevented in this way shall not hold the assembly on this day.

Notes: Oscan carn- "part, piece" is related to Latin carn- "meat" (seen in English 'carnivore'), from a Proto-Indo-European root *(s)ker- meaning 'cut'--apparently the Latin word originally meant 'piece (of meat).' Oscan tangin- "judgement, assent" is ultimately related to English 'think'.

The formula senateis tanginud near the beginning of this passage is probably a calque (semantic borrowing) of the common Latin legal formula de senatus sententia "by decision of the Senate."

=== Second paragraph ===
Lines 8–11

In Oscan:

(8) ...Pis pocapit post post exac comono hafies meddis dat castris loufir (9) en eituas, factud pous touto deiuatuns tanginom deicans, siom dateizasc idic tangineis (10) deicum, pod walaemom touticom tadait ezum. nep fefacid pod pis dat eizac egmad min[s] (11) deiuaid dolud malud. Suae pis contrud exeic fefacust auti comono hipust, molto etan- (12) -to estud: n..

In English:

(8) ...Whatever magistrate shall hereafter hold an assembly in suit involving the death penalty (9) or a fine, let him make the people pronounce judgment, after having sworn that they will such judgment (10) render, as they believe to be for the best public good, and let him prevent anyone from, in this matter, (11) swearing with guile. If anyone shall act or hold a council contrary to this, let the fine be 2000 sesterces.

Notes: In line 11, the phrase suae pis contrud exeic fefacust "If anyone shall act counter to this" recurs in line 17 and in line 25, though with a different verb: pruhipust. This again seems to be a word for word borrowing of the Latin legal phrase si quis adversus ea fecerit.

=== Third paragraph ===
In Oscan:

Suaepis pru meddixud altrei castrous auti eituas (14) zicolom dieust, izic comono ni hipid ne pon op toutad petirupert urust sipus perum dolom (15) mallom in. trutum zico. touto peremust. Petiropert, neip mais pomtis com preiuatud actud (16) pruterpam medicatinom didest, in, pon posmom con preiuatud urust eisucen ziculud (17) zicolom XXX nesimum comonomni hipid. Suae pis contrud exeic fefacust ionc suaepis (18) herest meddis moltaum, licitud, ampert mistreis aeteis eituas licitud.

In English:

If any magistrate shall have appointed the day for another in a suit involving the death penalty or a fine, he must not hold the assembly until he has brought the accusation four times in the presence of the people without guile, and the people have been advised of the fourth day. Four times, and not more than five, must he argue the case with the defendant before he pronounces the indictment, and when he has argued for the last time with the defendant he must not hold the assembly within thirty days from that day. And if any one shall have done contrary to this, if any magistrate wishes to fix the fine, he may, but only for less than half the property of the guilty person be it permitted.

Notes: The Oscan legal phrase perum dolom mallom (14-15) seems to be a calque (semantic translation) of the widespread Latin legal phrase sine dolo malo "without bad intent." Further, "sipus(perum) dolom mallom" seems to reflect another common Latin legal phrase, sciens dolo malo "knowingly with bad intent."

The formula suae pis contrud exeic fefacust ionc suae pis herest meddis moltaum licitud ‘If anyone acts contrary to this, if any magistrate shall wish to fine him, it is allowed’ is essentially a word for word translation of the third century Latin legal phrase sei quis aruorsu hac faxit ... seiue mac[i]steratus uolet moltare, [li]cetod. ‘If anyone acts contrary to this ... if a magistrate wants to impose a fine, it is allowed.’

=== Fourth paragraph ===
In Oscan:

Pon censtur (19) Bansae toutam censazet pis ceus Bantins fust, censamur esvf in, eituam poizad ligud (20) iusc censtur censaum angetuzet Aut suaepis censtomen nei cebnust dolud mallud (21) in. eizeic uincter, esuf comenei lamatir pr. meddixud toutad praesentid perum dolum (22) mallom, in. amiricatud alio famelo in. ei. siuom paei eizeisfust pae ancensto fust, (23) toutico estud.

In English:

When the censors shall take the census of the people of Bantia, whoever is a citizen of Bantia shall be rated, himself and his property, according to the law under which these censors shall have proposed to take the census. And if any one fraudulently fails to come to the census, and is convicted of it, let him be scourged (?) in the assembly, under the magistracy of the praetor, in the presence of the people, and let the rest of his household, and all his property which is not rated, become public property without remuneration to him.

=== Fifth paragraph ===
In Oscan:

Pr, suae praefucus pod post exac Bansaefust, suae pis op eizois com (24) atrud ligud acum herest, auti pru medicatud manim aserum eizazunc egmazum (25) pas exaiscen ligis serif tas set, ne phim pruhipid mais zicolois X nesimois. Suae pis contrud (26) exeic pruhipust, molto etanto estud: n. . In. suaepis ionc meddis moltaunt herest, licitud.

In English:

The praetor, or if there shall be a prefect at Bantia after this, in case any one wishes to go to law with another before them, or to make a forcible seizure, as if judgment had been rendered, on these matters which are written of in these laws, shall not prevent one for more than the ten succeeding days. If any one contrary to this shall prevent, the fine shall be 1000 sesterces. And if any magistrate wishes to fix the fine he may do so, but only for a fine involving less than half the property shall it be permitted.

=== Sixth paragraph ===
The sixth paragraph is more fragmentary that the first five.

In Oscan:

Pr, censtur Bansae (28) ne pisfu\idy nei suae q. fust, nep censtur fuidj net suae pr. fust. In. suaepii pr. in. suae- . . . (29) ]um nerumfust, izic post eizuc tr.pl. nifuid. Suaepis (30) [contrud exeic tr. pL facus f]ust izic amprufid facus estud. Idic medicifn eizuc (31) ...[pocapid Bansae']... medicim acunumm IV nesimum (32) ... um pod (33) ... medicim.

In English:

No one shall be praetor or censor of Bantia unless he has been quaestor, nor shall any one be censor unless he has been praetor. And if any one shall be praetor, and ... he shall not become a tribune of the people after this. And if any one shall be made tribune contrary to this, he shall be made so wrongfully.

=== Fragment Adamesteano ===
Transcription:

]-LEIIST DOLOM[
]D MALUD SUDANA [
]ONC MEDDIS MOLTAUM H [
]MOLTAUM LICITUD PIS [?] CC ARA [
]STRAM CARNOM ACENEIS USUROM
]N II EH EX AC LIGUD ALLAM
]HIPUST PANTES CENSAS FUST
]S ACENEI POIZEIPID SPENTUD Q
]S IN EISIUSS DEIV ANS DEAVAT
]ENEIS PERUM DOLUM MALOM

Notes: The exact meaning of this fragment is not completely clear, but it seems to refer to a fine of 1200 pounds in silver, to the census and to an oath.

Note first full phrase and the final phrase, perum dolum malum/d discussed above.

The phrase ex ac ligud seems to be a borrowing of the very common Latin legal phrase ex hac(e) lege "in accordance with this law."
