= Marietta Horster =

German historian of classical antiquity (born 1961)

- Born: 8 June 1961 (age 65); Düsseldorf, Germany

Academic background
- Education: University of Cologne
- Thesis: Bauinschriften römischer Kaiser. Untersuchungen zu Inschriftenpraxis und Bautätigkeit in Städten des westlichen Imperium Romanum in der Zeit des Prinzipats

Academic work
- Discipline: Classical archaeology
- Institutions: University of Cologne; Berlin-Brandenburg Academy of Sciences; Gerda Henkel Foundation; Humboldt University; University of Hamburg; University of Mainz

Marietta Horster (born 8 June 1961) is Professor of Ancient history at the University of Mainz. She specialises in the study of epigraphy in the Roman Empire.

== Biography ==
Horster studied Ancient History, Latin and Political Science at the Universities of Lausanne, Bonn and Cologne and completed her studies in 1989 in Cologne with a master's degree in Ancient History, Latin and Political Science. From 1990 to 1994 she was Research Associate at the Department of Ancient History of Werner Eck at the University of Cologne, where she was awarded her doctorate in 1995. Her thesis was on the study of building inscriptions of Roman emperors in the west of the empire.

From 1995 to 2001, Horster taught as a research assistant at the Institute of Classical Studies at the University of Rostock. In the winter of 1998/99 she was a Sterling Dow Fellow at the Center for Epigraphic and Paleographical Studies at Ohio State University in Columbus, Ohio. Horster was a research associate of the Berlin-Brandenburg Academy of Sciences and a research fellow of the Gerda Henkel Foundation. She subsequently was a visiting professor at the Humboldt University in Berlin and held a chair at the University of Hamburg. In 2010, she succeeded Leonhard Schumacher as Professor of Ancient History at the University of Mainz.

== Select bibliography ==
- 1997. Literarische Zeugnisse kaiserlicher Bautätigkeit. Eine Studie zu Baumassnahmen in Städten des Römischen Reiches während des Prinzipats. Stuttgart/Leipzig, Teubner.
- 2001. Bauinschriften römischer Kaiser. Untersuchungen zu Inschriftenpraxis und Bautätigkeit in Städten des westlichen Imperium Romanum in der Zeit des Prinzipats (Historia Einzelschriften. 157). Stuttgart, Steiner.
- 2004. Landbesitz griechischer Heiligtümer in archaischer und klassischer Zeit (Religionsgeschichtliche Versuche und Vorarbeiten 53). Berlin, De Gruyter.
- 2011. with Klöckner, A. (eds) Civic Priests : Cult Personnel in Athens from the Hellenistic Period to Late Antiquity. Berlin, De Gruyter.
