= Oscan language =

Extinct language of southern Italy

Oscan
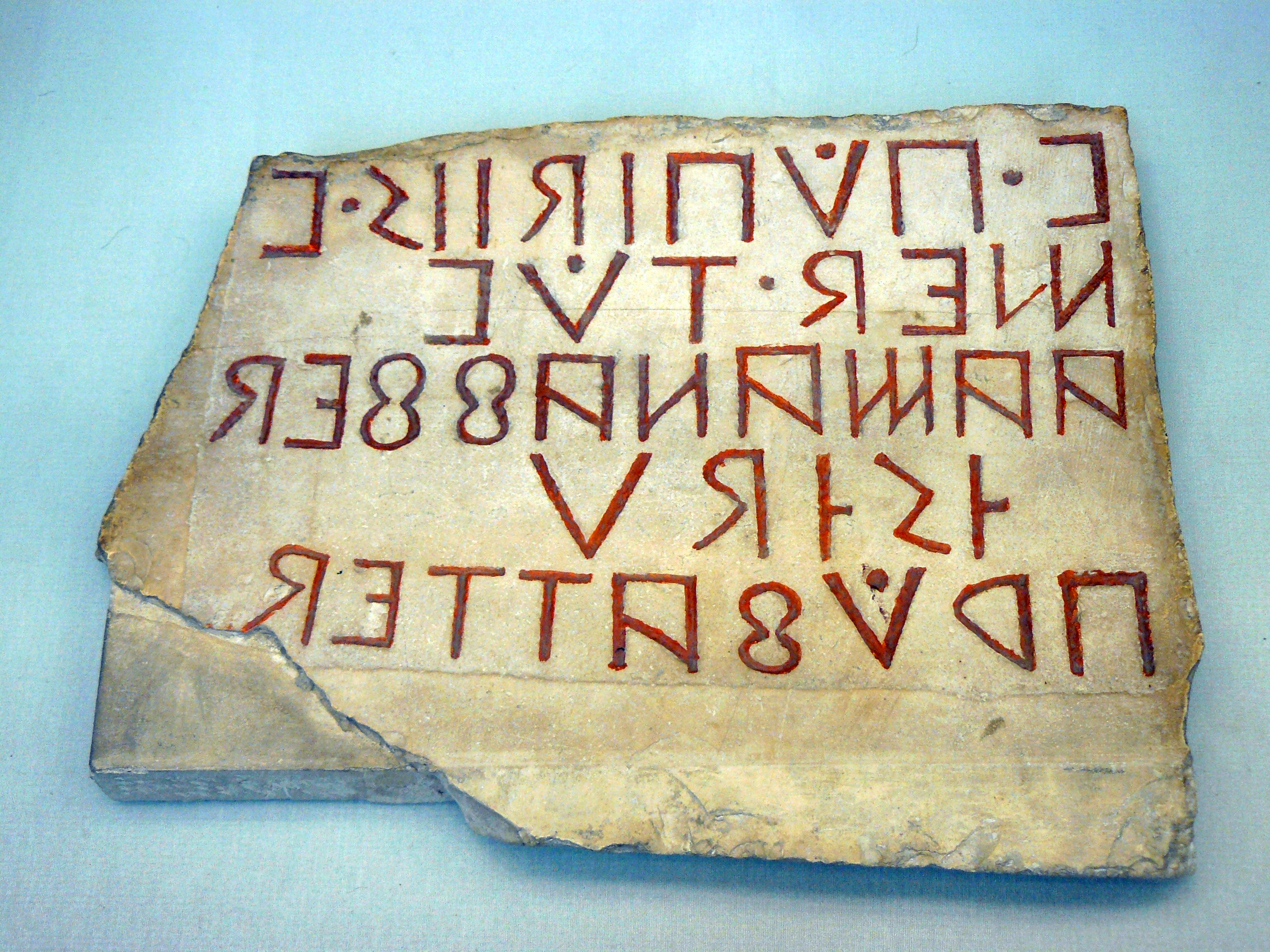
- Oscan inscription from around 300–100 BC
- Native to: Samnium, Campania, Lucania and Bruttium
- Region: south and south-central Italy
- Extinct: after 79 AD
- Language family: Indo-European: Italic; Osco-Umbrian (Sabellic); Oscan
- Early forms: Proto-Indo-European: Proto-Italic
- Dialects: Hernican; Marrucinian; Oscan proper; Paelignian; Vestinian?
- Writing system: Old Italic alphabet, Greek alphabet, later the Latin alphabet

Language codes
- ISO 639-3: osc
- Glottolog: osca1245
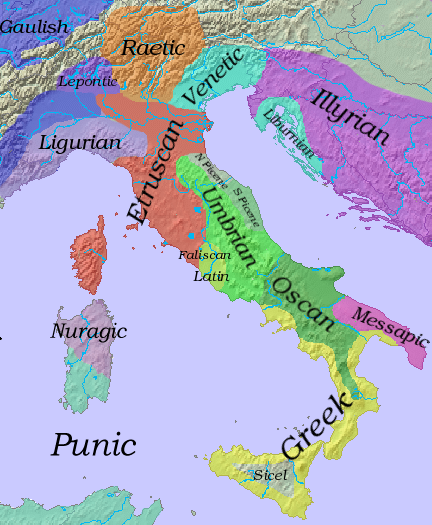
- Approximate distribution of languages in Iron Age Italy in the sixth century BC

Oscan is an extinct Indo-European language of southern Italy. The language is in the Osco-Umbrian or Sabellic branch of the Italic languages. Oscan is therefore a close relative of Umbrian and South Picene.

Oscan was spoken by a number of tribes, including the Samnites, the Lucani, the Aurunci (Ausones), and the Sidicini. The latter two tribes were often grouped under the name "Osci". Oscan is part of the Osco-Umbrian or Sabellic family and a number of poorly attested varieties of the eastern central Italian highlands – Hernican, Marrucinian, Paelignian and possibly Vestinian – are conventionally grouped with Oscan, though their exact position within Sabellic remain disputed. Adapted from the Etruscan alphabet, the Central Oscan alphabet was used to write Oscan in Campania and surrounding territories from the 5th century BC until at least the 1st century AD.

== Evidence ==
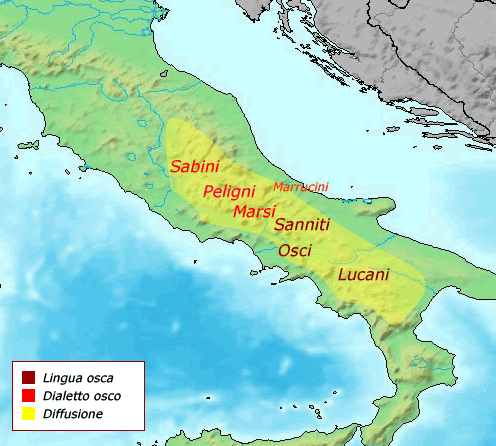
The Oscan language in the 5th century BC

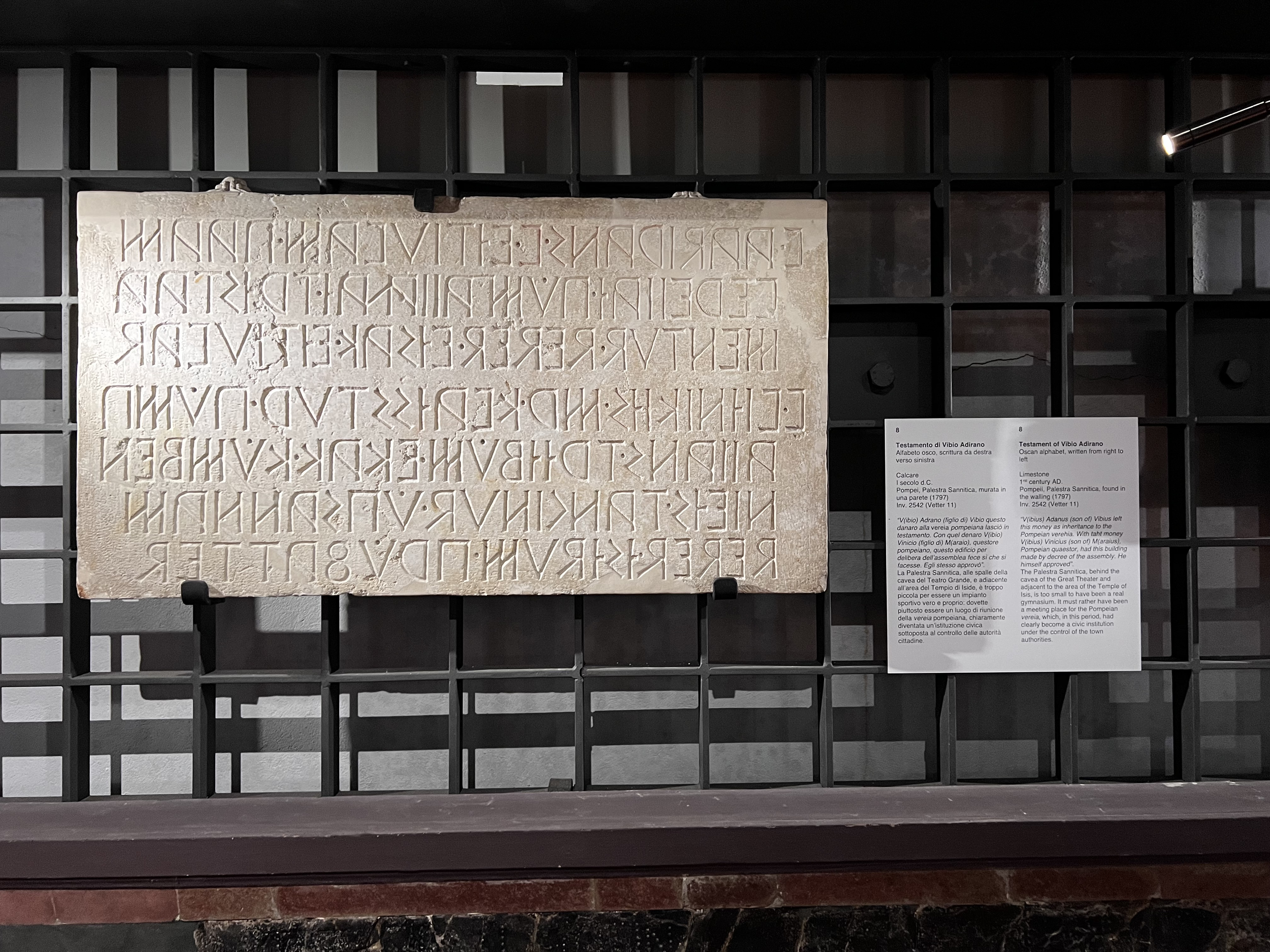
1st century inscription at the Naples Archaeological Museum

Oscan is known from inscriptions dating as far back as the 5th century BC. The most important Oscan inscriptions are the Tabula Bantina, the Oscan Tablet or Tabula Osca, and the Cippus Abellanus. In Apulia, there is evidence that ancient currency was inscribed in Oscan (dating to before 300 BC) at Teanum Apulum. Oscan graffiti on the walls of Pompeii indicate its persistence in at least one urban environment well into the 1st century AD.

In total, as of 2017, there were 800 found Oscan texts, with a rapid expansion in recent decades. Oscan was written in various scripts depending on time period and location, including the "native" Oscan script, the South Oscan script which was based on Greek, and the ultimately prevailing Roman Oscan script.

=== Demise ===
In coastal zones of Southern Italy, Oscan is thought to have survived three centuries of bilingualism with Greek between 400 and 100 BC, making it "an unusual case of stable societal bilingualism" wherein neither language became dominant or caused the death of the other; however, over the course of the Roman period, both Oscan and Greek were progressively effaced from Southern Italy, excepting the controversial possibility of Griko representing a continuation of ancient dialects of Greek. Oscan's usage declined following the Social War. Graffiti in towns across the Oscan speech area indicate it remained in colloquial usage. One piece of evidence that supports the colloquial usage of the language is the presence of Oscan graffiti on walls of Pompeii that were reconstructed after the earthquake of 62 AD, which must therefore have been written between 62 and 79 AD. Other scholars argue that this is not strong evidence for the survival of Oscan as an official language in the area, given the disappearance of public inscriptions in Oscan after Roman colonization. It is possible that both languages existed simultaneously under different conditions, in which Latin was given political, religious, and administrative importance while Oscan was considered a "low" language. This phenomenon is referred to as diglossia with bilingualism. Some Oscan graffiti exists from the 1st century CE, but it is rare to find evidence from Italy of Latin-speaking Roman citizens representing themselves as having non–Latin-speaking ancestors.

== General characteristics ==
Oscan speakers came into close contact with the Latium population. Early Latin texts have been discovered near major Oscan settlements. For example, the Garigliano Bowl was found close to Minturnae, less than 40 kilometers from Capua, which was once a large Oscan settlement. Oscan had much in common with Latin, though there are also many striking differences, and many common word-groups in Latin were absent or represented by entirely different forms. For example, Latin volo, velle, volui, and other such forms from the Proto-Indo-European root *welh₁- ('to will') were represented by words derived from *gʰer- ('to desire'): Oscan herest ('(s)he shall want, (s)he shall desire', German cognate 'begehren', Dutch 'begeren', English cognate 'yearn') as opposed to Latin volent (id.). Oscan has no cognate of Latin locus 'place'; in the Cippus Abellanus the corresponding term is slaagid/slagím, of disputed meaning but apparently denoting a territory or boundary zone rather than a place in general. Alberto Manco has linked the word to a surviving local toponym.

In phonology too, Oscan exhibited a number of clear differences from Latin: thus, Oscan 'p' in place of Latin 'qu' (Osc. pis, Lat. quis) (compare the similar P-Celtic/Q-Celtic cleavage in the Celtic languages); 'b' in place of Latin 'v'; medial 'f' in contrast to Latin 'b' or 'd' (Osc. mefiai, Lat. mediae).

Oscan is considered to be the most conservative of all the known Italic languages, and among attested Indo-European languages it is rivaled only by Greek in the retention of the inherited vowel system with the diphthongs intact.

== Writing system ==
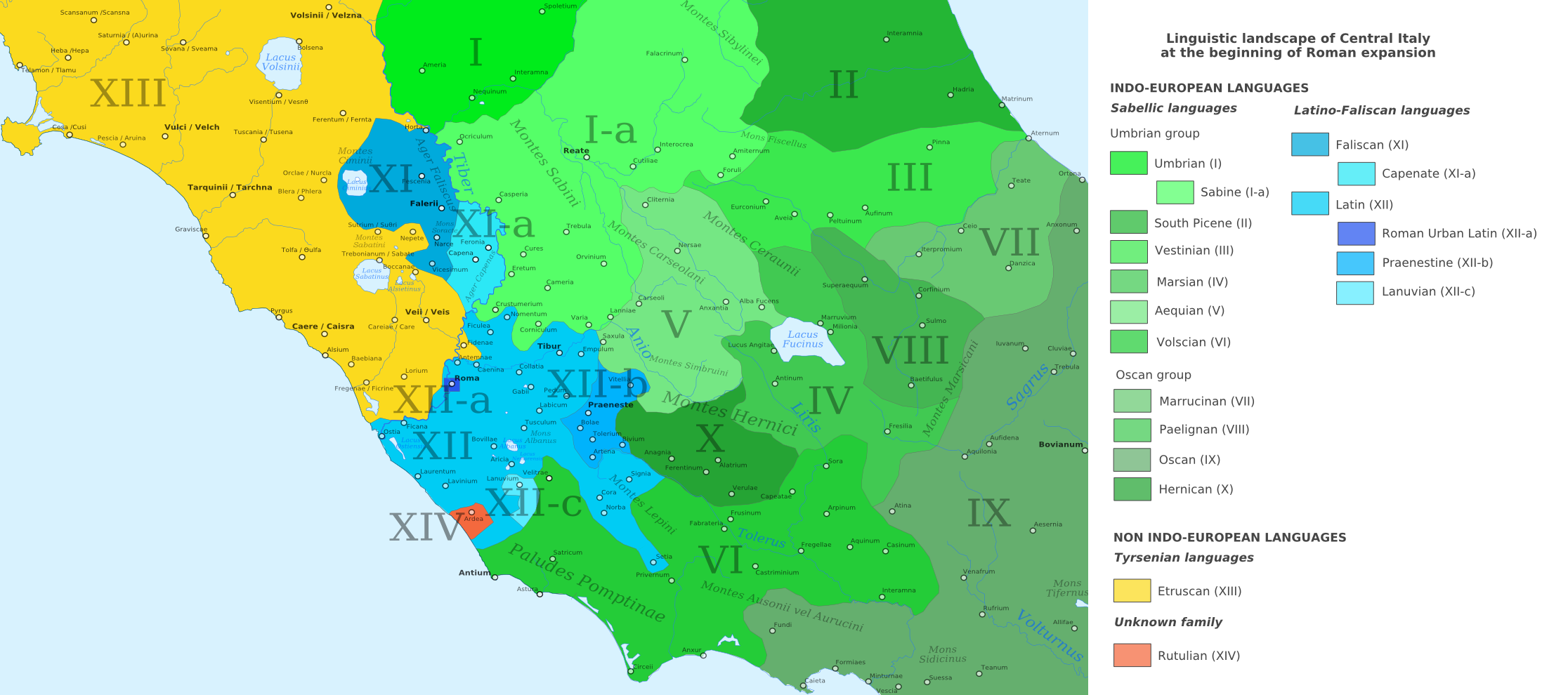
The linguistic landscape of Central Italy at the beginning of Roman expansion

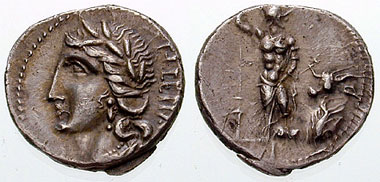
Denarius of Marsican Confederation with Oscan legend

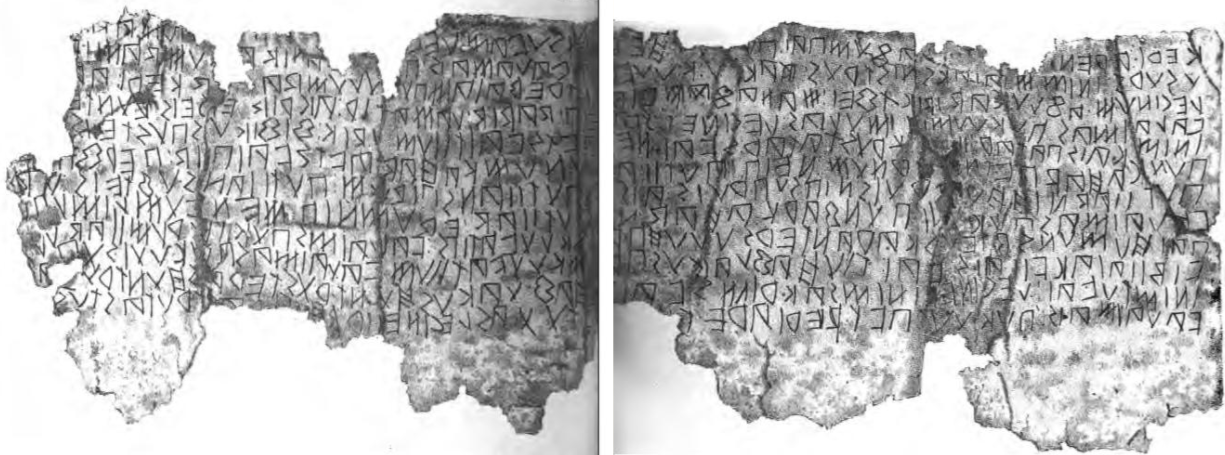
The Curse of Vibia, an Oscan curse tablet with numerous peculiar orthographic features

=== Alphabet ===
Oscan was originally written in a specific "Oscan alphabet", one of the Old Italic scripts derived from (or cognate with) the Etruscan alphabet. Later inscriptions are written in the Greek and Latin alphabets.

==== The Etruscan alphabet ====
The Osci probably adopted the archaic Etruscan alphabet during the 7th century BC, but a recognizably Oscan variant of the alphabet is attested only from the 5th century BC. At the beginning of the 3rd century BC its sign inventory was extended over the classical Etruscan alphabet by the introduction of lowered variants of I and U, transcribed as Í and Ú. Ú came to be used to represent Oscan /o/, while U was used for /u/ as well as historical long */oː/, which had undergone a sound shift in Oscan to become ~[uː]. Í was used to denote a higher-mid [ẹ].

The Z of the native alphabet is pronounced [ts]. Doubling of vowels was used to denote length but a long I is written IÍ.

==== The Greek alphabet ====
Oscan written with the Greek alphabet was identical to the standard alphabet with the addition of two letters: one for the native alphabet's H:, and one for its V:. The letters η and ω do not indicate quantity. Sometimes, the clusters ηι and ωϝ denote the diphthongs /ei/ and /ou/ respectively while ει and oυ are saved to denote monophthongs /iː/ and /uː/ of the native alphabet. At other times, ει and oυ are used to denote diphthongs, in which case o denotes the /uː/ sound.

==== The Latin alphabet ====
When written in the Latin alphabet, the Oscan Z does not represent [ts] but instead [z], which is not written differently from [s] in the native alphabet.

==== Transliteration ====
When Oscan inscriptions are quoted, it is conventional to transliterate those in the Oscan alphabet into Latin boldface, those in the Latin alphabet into Latin italics, and those in the Greek alphabet into the modern Greek alphabet. Letters of all three alphabets are represented in lower case.

== Phonology ==
=== Vowels ===
Vowels are regularly lengthened before ns and nct (in the latter of which the n is lost) and possibly before nf and nx as well. Anaptyxis, the development of a vowel between a liquid or nasal and another consonant, preceding or following, occurs frequently in Oscan; if the other (non-liquid/nasal) consonant precedes, the new vowel is the same as the preceding vowel. If the other consonant follows, the new vowel is the same as the following vowel.

==== Monophthongs ====
===== A =====
Short a remains in most positions Long ā remains in an initial or medial position. Final ā starts to sound similar to [ɔː] so that it is written ú or, rarely, u.

===== E =====
Short e "generally remains unchanged;" before a labial in a medial syllable, it becomes u or i, and before another vowel, e raises to higher-mid [ẹ], written í. Long ē similarly raises to higher-mid [ẹ], the sound of written í or íí.

===== I =====
Short i becomes written í. Long ī is spelt with i but when written with doubling as a mark of length with ií.

===== O =====
Short o remains mostly unchanged, written ú; before a final -m, o becomes more like u. Long ō becomes denoted by u or uu.

===== U =====
Short u generally remains unchanged; after t, d, n, the sound becomes that of iu. Long ū generally remains unchanged; it changed to an ī sound in monosyllables, and may have changed to an ī sound for final syllables.

==== Diphthongs ====
Oscan had the following diphthongs:

| /ai/ | /ei/ | /oi/ |
| /au/ | /eu/ | /ou/ |

The sounds of diphthongs remain unchanged from the Proto-Indo-European origins.

=== Consonants ===
The consonant inventory of Oscan is as follows:

| | | Labial | Alveolar | Palatal | Velar | Glottal |
|---|---|---|---|---|---|---|
| Plosive | voiceless | p | t | | k | |
| Plosive | voiced | b | d | | ɡ | |
| Fricative | | f | s | | | h |
| Nasal | | m | n | | | |
| Liquid | | | l | | | |
| Rhotic | | | r | | | |
| Semivowel | | | | j | w | |

==== S ====
In Oscan, s between vowels did not undergo rhotacism as it did in Latin and Umbrian; but it was voiced, becoming the sound /z/. However, between vowels, the original cluster rs developed either to a simple r with lengthening on the preceding vowel, or to a long rr (as in Latin), and at the end of a word, original rs becomes r just as in Latin. Unlike in Latin, the s is not dropped, either Oscan or Umbrian, from the consonant clusters sm, sn, sl: Umbrian `sesna "dinner," Oscan kersnu vs Latin cēna.

== Morphology ==
=== Noun declension ===
Oscan nouns can have one of the seven cases: nominative, vocative, accusative, genitive, dative, ablative and locative (the last being vestigial in classical Latin). Oscan nouns, like in Latin, are divided into multiple declension patterns.

==== First-declension nouns ====
The first declension in Oscan has three primary differences from Latin.

- The ablative singular has the ending -ad as opposed to the -ā of Classical Latin, but agrees with Archaic Latin (e.g. puellād).
- It retains the Proto-Italic genitive singular ending -ās, which was eventually replaced by -ae in Classical Latin, but is still present in archaizing forms (e.g. pater familiās).
- Oscan retains the inherited genitive plural consonant as a voiced sibilant, giving -azúm < *-āsōm, where Latin rhotacised to -ārum.

First declension nouns in Oscan are declined as follows:

Oscan first declension
| | Singular | Plural |
|---|---|---|
| Nominative | -ú, -o, -ο (Note: Proto-Italic *-ā changes in quality to a sound similar to [ɔː] so that it is written ú ⟨𐌞⟩, o, ο, or—rarely—u ⟨𐌖⟩ or u. Compare Latin, which shortened -ā to -a.) | -as, -as (Note: Proto-italic *-ās is retained.) |
| Vocative | ? | ? |
| Accusative | -am, -am (Note: Proto-italic *-ām is retained.) | -ass, -as |
| Genitive | -as, -as (Note: Proto-italic *-ās is retained.) | -asúm, -azum (Note: < -āzom < -āsōm.) |
| Dative | -aí (Note: Proto-italic *-āi is shortened to -ai.) | -aís (Note: Compare Greek -αις, both modelled after o-stem declension -ois.) |
| Ablative | -ad, -ad (Note: Proto-italic *-ād < *-ōd is retained.) | -aís |
| Locative | -aí, -ae | -aís |

==== Second-declension nouns ====
The second declension in Oscan has a few features that distinguish it from its Latin counterpart.

- The nominative singular of masculines features the syncope of *-os to -s, leading to further phonetic and orthographic consequences.
- The genitive singular -eís is taken from the i-stems.
- The nominative plural -ús preserves the usual Indo-European nominative plural ending for animate thematic nouns, which Latin replaced with -ī < *-oi from pronominal declensions.

These nouns in Oscan are declined as follows:

Oscan second declension
| | Singular | Plural |
|---|---|---|
| Nominative | -s, -s (masculine) (Note: If a cluster /ts/ is formed by this ending, the cluster is spelled as -z, for instance in húrz "enclosure" (< *hortos).) -úm, -om (neuter) | -ús (masculine) -ú, -o (neuter) |
| Vocative | ? | ? |
| Accusative | -úm, -om (Note: -im in io-stem nouns like Pakis (personal name), accusative Pakim.) | -úss (masculine) -ú, -o (neuter) |
| Genitive | -eís | -úm, -om |
| Dative | -úí, -ei | -úís, -ois |
| Ablative | -úd, -ud | -úís, -ois |
| Locative | -eí | -úís, -ois |

==== Third-declension nouns ====
Like in Latin, the third declension in Oscan is a merger of the i-stem nouns with the consonant-stem nouns.

These nouns in Oscan are declined as follows. Neuters are not attested.

Oscan third declension
| | Singular | Plural |
|---|---|---|
| Nominative | -s (Note: Absorbs the stem-final consonant in some words and is outright absent in others.) | -s (Note: If a cluster /ts/ is formed by this ending, the cluster is spelled as -z, for instance in deívúz (a class of deity).) |
| Vocative | ? | ? |
| Accusative | -um | -s |
| Genitive | -eís | -úm |
| Dative | -eí | -is |
| Ablative | -úd | -is |
| Locative | | -is |

=== Verbal system ===
Verbs in Oscan are inflected for the following categories:

- Tense (present, imperfect, future, perfect, and future perfect),
- Voice (active, deponent/passive)
- Mood (indicative, imperative, subjunctive)
- Person (1st, 2nd, 3rd)
- Number (singular, plural)

Present, future and future perfect forms in the active voice use the following set of personal endings:

| | Singular | Plural |
|---|---|---|
| 1st | -ō | |
| 2nd | -s | |
| 3rd | -t | -nt |

Imperfect, perfect indicative and all tenses of the subjunctive in the active voice use a different set of endings:

| | Singular | Plural |
|---|---|---|
| 1st | -m | |
| 2nd | -s | |
| 3rd | -d | -ns |

Passive endings are attested only for the 3rd person: singular -ter, plural -nter.

Perfect stems are derived from the present stem in different ways. Latin -vī- and -s- perfects are not attested in Oscan. Instead, Oscan uses its own set of forms, including reduplicated perfects such as deded 'gave', -tt- suffix as in prúfa-tt-ed 'approved', -k- suffix as in kella-k-ed 'collected', and -f- suffix as in aíkda-f-ed 'rebuilt'. Some verbs also use suppletive forms.

Other tenses are formed by suffixation:

| Mood | Tense | Stem | Suffix | Example |
|---|---|---|---|---|
| Indicative | Imperfect | Present | -fā- | fu-fa-ns 'they were' |
| Indicative | Future | Present | -(e)s- | deiua-s-t 'he will swear' |
| Indicative | Future perfect | Perfect | -us- | tríbarakatt-us-et 'they will have built' |
| Subjunctive | Present | Present | -ī- (for a-stems), -ā- (for other stems) | deiua-i-d 'let him swear' |
| Subjunctive | Imperfect | Present | -sē- | fu-sí-d 'should be' |
| Subjunctive | Perfect | Perfect | -ē- | tríbarakatt-í-ns 'should build' |

The following non-finite forms are attested (all of them are based on the present stem):

| Form | Suffix | Example |
|---|---|---|
| Present active participle | -nt- | praese-nt-id 'being at hand' (Abl.sg. fem.) |
| Past participle | -to- | teremna-tu 'widened' (Nom.sg. fem.) |
| Present active infinitive | -om | tríbarakav-úm 'to build' |
| Present passive infinitive | -fi/-fir | sakara-fír 'to be consecrated' |
| Gerundive | -nno- | úpsa-nna-m 'build' (Acc.sg. fem.) |

== Examples of Oscan texts ==
=== From the Cippus Abellanus ===
Ekkum svaí píd herieset trííbarak avúm tereí púd liímítúm pernúm púís herekleís fíísnú mefiú íst, ehtrad feíhúss pús herekleís fíísnam amfret, pert víam pússt íst paí íp íst, pústin slagím senateís suveís tanginúd tríbarakavúm líkítud. íním íúk tríbarakkiuf pam núvlanús tríbarakattuset íúk tríbarakkiuf íním úíttiuf abellanúm estud. avt púst feíhúís pús físnam amfret, eíseí tereí nep abellanús nep núvlanús pídum tríbarakattíns. avt thesavrúm púd eseí tereí íst, pún patensíns, múíníkad tanginúd patensíns, íním píd eíseí thesavreí púkkapíd eestit aíttíúm alttram alttrús herríns. avt anter slagím abellanam íním núvlanam súllad víú uruvú íst. pedú íst eísaí víaí mefiaí teremenniú staíet.

In Latin:

Item si quid volent aedificare in territorio quod limitibus tenus quibus Herculis fanum medium est, extra muros, qui Herculis fanum ambiunt, [per] viam positum est, quae ibi est, pro finibus senatus sui sententia, aedificare liceto. Et id aedificium quam Nolani aedificaverint, id aedificium et usus Abellanorum esto. At post muros qui fanum ambiunt, in eo territorio nec Avellani nec Nolani quidquam aedificaverint. At thesaurum qui in eo territorio est, cum paterent, communi sententia paterent, et quidquid in eo thesauro quandoque extat, portionum alteram alteri caperent. At inter fines Abellanos et Nolanos ubique via curva est, [pedes] est in ea via media termina stant.

In English:

And if anyone shall want to build on the land within the boundaries where the temple of Hercules stands in the middle, may the senate allow him to build outside of the walls that encircle the sanctuary of Hercules, across the road that leads there. And a building that a man from Nola builds, shall be for the use of the people of Nola. And a building that a man from Abella builds, shall be for the use of the people of Abella. But beyond the wall that encircles the sanctuary, in that territory neither the Abellans nor the Nolans may build anything. But the treasury that is in that territory, when it is opened it shall be opened following a shared decision, and whatever is in that treasury, they shall share equally amongst them. But the road between the borders of Abella and Nola is a communal road. The boundaries stand in the middle of this road.

=== From Tabula Bantina ===
There are six paragraphs in total, three are presented.

==== First paragraph ====
===== Lines 3-8 =====
The first couple lines are too damaged to be clearly legible:

(3) … deiuast maimas carneis senateis tanginud am … (4) XL osiins, pon ioc egmo comparascuster. Suae pis pertemust, pruter pan … (5) deiuatud sipus comenei, perum dolum malum, siom ioc comono mais egmas touti- (6)cas amnud pan pieisum brateis auti cadeis amnud; inim idic siom dat senates (7) tanginud maimas carneis pertumum. Piei ex comono pertemest, izic eizeic zicelei (8) comono ni hipid.

In Latin:

(3) … iurabit maximae partis senatus sententia [dummodo non minus] (4) XL adsint, cum ea res consulta erit. Si quis peremerit, prius quam peremerit, (5) iurato sciens in committio sine dolo malo, se ea comitia magis rei publicae causa, (6) quam cuiuspiam gratiae aut inimicitiae causa; idque se de senatus (7) sententia maximae partis perimere. Cui sic comitia perimet (quisquam), is eo die (8) comitia non habuerit.

In English:

(3) … he shall take oath with the assent of the majority of the senate, provided that not less than (4) 40 are present, when the matter is under advisement. If anyone by right of intercession shall prevent the assembly, before preventing it, (5) he shall swear wittingly in the assembly without guile, that he prevents this assembly rather for the sake of the public welfare, (6) rather than out of favor or malice toward anyone; and that too in accordance with the judgment of the majority of the senate. The presiding magistrate whose assembly is prevented in this way shall not hold the assembly on this day.

Notes: Oscan carn- “part, piece” is related to Latin carn- “meat” (seen in English ‘carnivore’), from an Indo-European root *ker- meaning ‘cut’―apparently the Latin word originally meant ‘piece (of meat).’ Oscan tangin- "judgement, assent" is ultimately related to English 'think'.

==== Second paragraph ====
===== Lines 8-13 =====
In this and the following paragraph, the assembly is being discussed in its judiciary function as a court of appeals:

(8) ...Pis pocapit post post exac comono hafies meddis dat castris loufir (9) en eituas, factud pous touto deiuatuns tanginom deicans, siom dateizasc idic tangineis (10) deicum, pod walaemom touticom tadait ezum. nep fefacid pod pis dat eizac egmad min[s] (11) deiuaid dolud malud. Suae pis contrud exeic fefacust auti comono hipust, molto etan- (12) -to estud: n.. In. suaepis ionc fortis meddis moltaum herest, ampert minstreis aeteis (13) aetuas moltas moltaum licitud.

In Latin:

(8) ...Quis quandoque post hac comitia habebit magistratus de capite (9) vel in pecunias, facito ut populus iuras sententiam dicant, se de iis id sententiae (10) deicum, quod optimum populum censeat esse, neve fecerit quo quis de ea re minus (11) iuret dolo malo. Si quis contra hoc fecerit aut comitia habuerit, multo tanta esto: n. MM. Et siquis eum potius magistratus multare volet, dumtaxat minoris partis (13) pecuniae multae multare liceto.

In English:

(8) ... Whatever magistrate shall hereafter hold an assembly in suit involving the death penalty (9) or a fine, let him make the people pronounce judgment, after having sworn that they will such judgment (10) render, as they believe to be for the best public good, and let him prevent anyone from, in this matter, (11) swearing with guile. If anyone shall act or hold a council contrary to this, let the fine be 2000 sesterces. And if any magistrate prefers to fix the fine, he may do so, provided it is less than the fine (13) already set.

==== Third Paragraph ====
===== Lines 13-18 =====
(13)...Suaepis pru meddixud altrei castrud auti eituas (14) zicolom dicust, izic comono ni hipid ne pon op toutad petirupert ururst sipus perum dolom (15) mallom in. trutum zico. touto peremust. Petiropert, neip mais pomptis, com preiuatud actud (16) pruter pam medicationom didest, in.pon posmom con preiuatud urust, eisucen zuculud (17) zicolom XXX nesimum comonom ni hipid. suae pid contrud exeic fefacust, ionc suaepist (18) herest licitud, ampert mistreis aeteis eituas

In Latin:

(13)... Siquis pro matistatu alteri capitis aut pecuniae (14) diem dixerit, is comitia ne habuerit nisi cum apud populum quater oraverit sciens sine dolo (15) malo et quartum diem populus perceperit. Quater, neque plus quinquens, reo agito (16) prius quam iudicationem dabit, et cum postremum cum reo oraverit, ab eo die (17) in diebus XXX proximis comitia non habuerit. Si quis contra hoc fecerit, eum siquis volet magistratus moltare, (18) liceto, dumtaxat minoris partis pecuniae liceto.

In English:

(13) ...If any magistrate, in a suit involving a death or a fine for another, (14) shall have appointed the day, he must not hold the assembly until he has brought the accusation four times in the presence of the people without (15) guile, and the people have been advised of the fourth day. Four times, and not more than five, must he argue the case with the defendant before he pronounces the indictment, and when he has argued for the last time with the defendant, he must not hold the assembly within thirty days from that day. And if anyone shall have done contrary to this, if any magistrate wishes to fix the fine, (18) he may, but only for a lesser amount.

=== The Testament of Vibius Adiranus ===
In Oscan:

v(iíbis). aadirans. v(iíbieís). eítiuvam. paam vereiiaí. púmpaiianaí. trístaamentud. deded. eísak. eítiuvad v(iíbis). viínikiís. m(a)r(aheis). kvaísstur. púmpaiians. trííbúm. ekak. kúmbennieís. tanginud. úpsannam deded. ísídum. prúfatted.

In English:

Vibius Adiranus, son of Vibius, gave in his will money to the Pompeian vereiia-. With this money, Vibius Vinicius, son of Maras, Pompeian quaestor, dedicated the construction of this building by decision of the senate, and the same man approved it.

== See also ==
- Ancient peoples of Italy

== Sources ==
- Buck, Carl Darling (1904). A Grammar of Oscan and Umbrian: with a Collection of Inscriptions and a Glossary. Boston: Ginn & Company. OCLC 1045590290.
- Salvucci, Claudio R. (1999). A Vocabulary of Oscan Including the Oscan and Samnite Glosses. Southampton, Pennsylvania: Evolution Publishing and Manufacturing Co.
- Wallace, Rex E. (2007). The Sabellic Languages of Ancient Italy. Munich: LINCOM.
