= History of Latin =

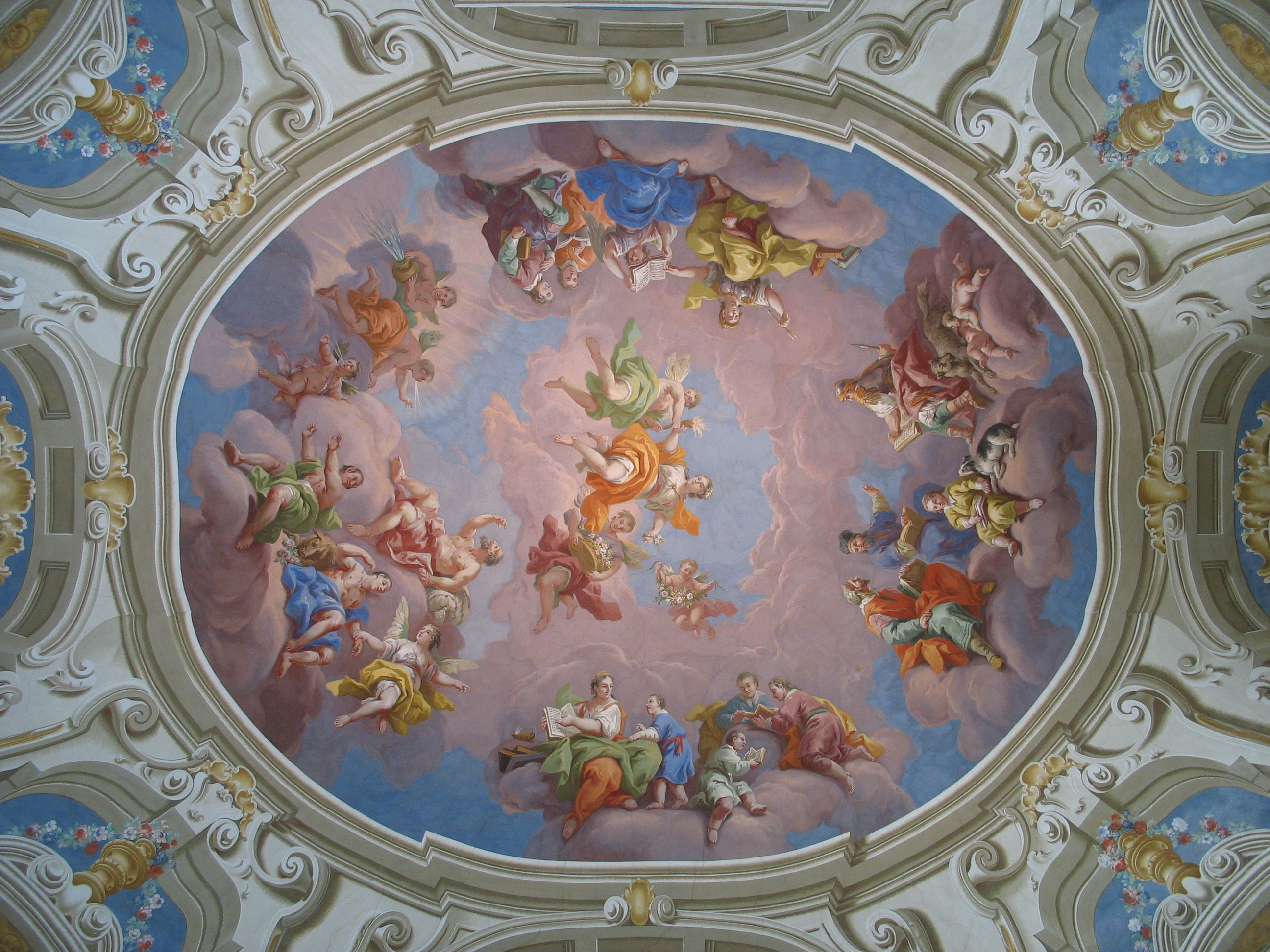
One of the seven ceiling frescoes painted by Bartolomeo Altomonte in his 80th year for the library of Admont Abbey in Austria. An allegory of the Enlightenment, it shows Aurora, goddess of dawn, with the geniuses of language in her train awakening Morpheus, god of dreaming, a symbol of man. The geniuses are Grammar, Didactic, Greek, Hebrew and Latin.

Ethnolinguistic map of Italy in the Iron Age, before the Roman expansion and conquest of Italy. Latin is confined to Latium, a small region on the coast of west central Italy, hemmed in by other Italic peoples on the east and south and the powerful Etruscan civilization on the north.

Latin is a member of the broad family of Italic languages. Its alphabet, the Latin alphabet, emerged from the Old Italic alphabets, which in turn were derived from the Etruscan, Greek and Phoenician scripts. Historical Latin came from the prehistoric language of the Latium region, specifically around the River Tiber, where Roman civilization first developed. How and when Latin came to be spoken has long been debated.

Various influences on Latin of Celtic speeches in northern Italy, the non-Indo-European Etruscan language in Central Italy, and the Greek in some Greek colonies of southern Italy have been detected, but when these influences entered the native Latin is not known for certain.

Surviving Roman-era Latin literature consists almost entirely of Classical Latin pieces usually chosen for their importance as help for people learning to write in Latin. Survivals emphasise polished and sometimes highly stylized literary language texts sometimes termed Golden Latin, which spans the 1st century BC and the early years of the 1st century AD.

As with any written language, the spoken language differed somewhat in grammar, tone and vocabulary, and is referred to as Vulgar Latin. However, theories that the spoken and written languages were more or less different, separated by class or elite education, are now generally rejected.

In addition to Latin, the well-educated elite often spoke Greek. They studied it in school and acquired Greek tutors from among the influx of enslaved educated Greek prisoners of war, captured during the Roman conquest of Greece. In the eastern half of the Roman Empire, later referred to as the Byzantine Empire, the Greek Koine of Hellenism remained current among peasants and traders, while Latin was used for laws and administrative writings. It continued to influence the Vulgar Latin that would evolve into the Eastern Romance languages.

Latin had a long working life beyond the Roman period, as it was the language of the Roman Catholic Church, and later of the Carolingian Holy Roman Empire. It was the dominant language of European learning, literature and academia through the Middle Ages, and in the early modern period. Latin's relevance as a widely used working language ended around 1800, although examples of its productive use extend well into that century, and in the cases of the Catholic Church and Classical studies, continue to the present day. As a result, the vast majority - over 99.99% of extant Latin texts - belong to these later periods, and especially to the Neo-Latin period.

== Origins ==
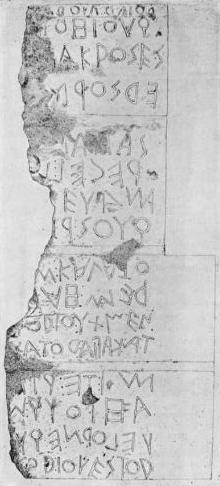
The Forum inscription (Lapis Niger, "black stone"), one of the oldest known Latin inscriptions, from the 6th century BC. It is written boustrophedon, albeit irregularly. From a rubbing by Domenico Comparetti.

The name Latin derives from the Italic tribal group named Latini that settled around the 10th century BC in Latium, and the dialect spoken by these people.

The Italic languages form a centum subfamily of the Indo-European language family, which include the Germanic, Celtic, and Hellenic languages, and a number of extinct ones.

Broadly speaking, in initial syllables the Indo-European simple vowels—*i, *e, (*a), *o, *u; short and long—are usually retained in Latin. The vocalized laryngeals (*ə) appear in Latin as a (cf. IE *pəter > L pater). Diphthongs are also preserved in Old Latin, but in Classical Latin some tend to become monophthongs (for example oi > ū or oe, and ei > ē > ī). In non-initial syllables, there was more vowel reduction. The most extreme case occurs with short vowels in medial open syllables (i.e. short vowels followed by at most a single consonant, occurring neither in the first nor last syllable): All are reduced to a single vowel, which appears as i in most cases, but e (sometimes o) before r, and u before an l which is followed by o or u. In final closed syllables, short e and o are usually raised to i and u, respectively.

Consonants are generally more stable. However, the Indo-European voiced aspirates bh, dh, gh, gwh are not maintained, becoming f, f, h, f respectively at the beginning of a word, but usually b, d, g, v elsewhere. Non-initial dh becomes b next to r or u, e.g. *h₁rudh- "red" > rub-, e.g. rubeō "to be red"; *werdh- "word" > verbum. s between vowels becomes r, e.g. flōs "flower", gen. flōris; erō "I will be" vs. root es-; aurōra "dawn" < *ausōsā (cf. Germanic *aust- > English "east", Vedic Sanskrit uṣā́s "dawn"); soror "sister" < *sozor < *swezōr < *swésōr (cf. Old English sweostor "sister").

Of the original eight cases of Proto-Indo-European, Latin inherited six: nominative, vocative, accusative, genitive, dative, and ablative. The Indo-European locative survived in the declensions of some place names and a few common nouns, such as Roma "Rome" (locative Romae) and domus "home" (locative domī "at home"). Vestiges of the instrumental case may remain in adverbial forms ending in -ē.

It is believed that the earliest surviving inscription is a seventh-century BC fibula known as the Praenestine fibula, which reads roughly Manios med fhefhaked Numasioi "Manius made me for Numerius".

== Ages of Latin ==
=== Old Latin ===
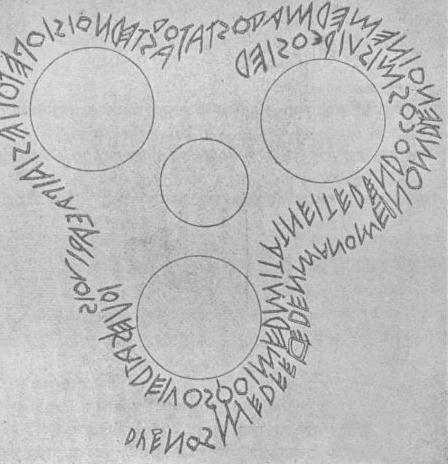
The Duenos inscription, from the 6th century BC, is the second-earliest known Latin text.

Old Latin (also called Early Latin or Archaic Latin) refers to the period of Latin texts before the age of Classical Latin, extending from textual fragments that probably originated in the Roman monarchy to the written language of the late Roman Republic about 75 BC. Almost all the writing of its earlier phases is inscriptional.

Some phonological characteristics of older Latin are the case endings -os and -om (later Latin -us and -um). In many locations, classical Latin turned intervocalic /s/ into /r/. This had implications for declension: early classical Latin, honos, honosis; Classical honor, honoris ("honor"). Some Latin texts preserve /s/ in this position, such as the Carmen Arvale's lases for lares.

=== Classical Latin ===
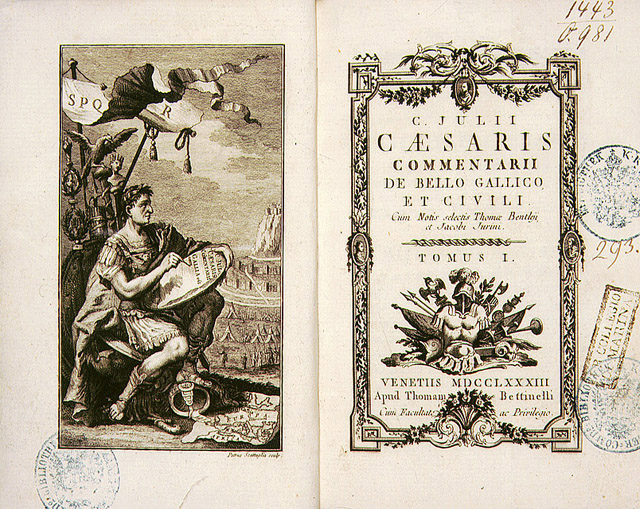
Julius Caesar's Commentarii de Bello Gallico is one of the most famous classical Latin texts of the Golden Age of Latin. The unvarnished, journalistic style of this upper-class general has long been taught as a model of the urbane Latin officially spoken and written in the floruit of the Roman Republic.

Classical Latin is the form of the Latin language used by the ancient Romans in Classical Latin literature. In the latest and narrowest philological model, its use spanned the Golden Age of Latin literature—broadly the 1st century BC and the early 1st century AD—possibly extending to the Silver Age—broadly the 1st and 2nd centuries. It was a polished written literary language based on the refined spoken language of the upper classes. Classical Latin differs from Old Latin, the earliest inscriptional language and the earliest authors, such as Ennius, Plautus and others, in a number of ways; for example, the early -om and -os endings shifted into -um and -us ones, and some lexical differences also developed, such as the broadening of the meaning of words. In the broadest and most ancient sense, the classical period includes the authors of Early Latin, the Golden Age and the Silver Age.

==== Golden Age ====
The Golden age of Latin literature is a period consisting roughly of the time from 75 BC to AD 14, covering the end of the Roman Republic and the reign of Augustus Caesar. In the currently used philological model this period represents the peak of Latin literature. Since the earliest post-classical times the Latin of those authors has been an ideal norm of the best Latin, which other writers should follow

==== Silver Age ====
In reference to Roman literature, the Silver age covers the first two centuries AD directly after the Golden age. Literature from the Silver Age is more embellished with mannerisms.

=== Late Latin ===
Late Latin is the administrative and literary language of Late Antiquity in the late Roman empire and states that succeeded the Western Roman Empire over the same range. By its broadest definition, it is dated from about 200 AD to about 900 AD, when it was replaced by written Romance languages. Opinion concerning whether it should be considered classical is divided. The authors of the period looked back to a classical period which they believed should be imitated and yet their styles were often classical. According to the narrowest definitions, Late Latin did not exist and the authors of the times are to be considered medieval.

==== Vulgar Latin ====
Vulgar Latin, as in this political graffito at Pompeii, was the language of the ordinary people of the Roman Empire, distinct from the Classical Latin of literature.

Vulgar Latin (in Latin, sermo vulgaris) is a blanket term covering vernacular usage or dialects of the Latin language spoken from earliest times in Italy until the latest dialects of the Western Roman Empire, diverging significantly after 500 AD, evolved into the early Romance languages, whose writings began to appear about the 9th century.

Spoken Latin differed from the literary language of Classical Latin in aspects of its grammar and vocabulary, as any language differs in written and spoken registers. It is likely to have evolved over time, with some features not appearing until the late Empire. Other features are likely to have been in place much earlier. Because there are few phonetic transcriptions of the daily speech of these Latin speakers (to match, for example, the post-classical Appendix Probi) earlier forms of spoken Latin must be studied mainly by indirect methods, such as errors made in texts and transcripts. Nevertheless, while Latin was spoken by native speakers, there is consensus that it was the same language; there was no "unbridgeable gap" between spoken and written Latin.

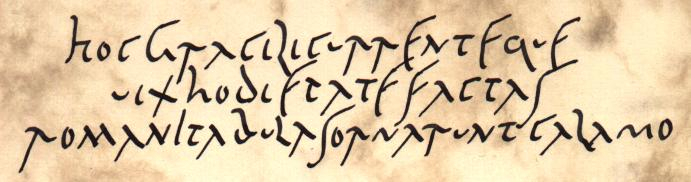
A replica of the Old Roman Cursive inspired by the Vindolanda tablets found in northern England

Knowledge of Vulgar Latin comes from a variety of sources. Prescriptive grammar texts from the Late Latin period condemn some usages as errors, providing insight into how Latin was actually spoken. The solecisms and non-Classical usages occasionally found in Late Latin texts also shed light on the spoken language, especially after 500 AD. A windfall source lies in the chance finds of wax tablets such as those found at Vindolanda on Hadrian's Wall. Finally, the comparative method can help test hypotheses about spoken Latin.

==== Romance languages ====
The Romance languages, a major branch of the Indo-European language family, comprise all languages that descended from Latin, the language of the Roman Empire. The Romance languages have more than 900 million native speakers worldwide, mainly in the Americas, Europe, and Africa, as well as in many smaller regions scattered through the world.

All Romance languages descend from Vulgar Latin, the language of soldiers, settlers, and slaves of the Roman Empire, which was substantially different from that of the Roman literati. Between 200 BC and AD 100, the expansion of the Empire and the administrative and educational policies of Rome made Vulgar Latin the dominant vernacular language over a wide area which stretched from the Iberian Peninsula to the west coast of the Black Sea.

During the Empire's decline and after its collapse and fragmentation in the 5th century, spoken Latin began to evolve independently within each local area, and eventually diverged into dozens of distinct languages. The overseas empires established by Spain, Portugal and France after the 15th century then spread these languages to other continents; about two thirds of all Romance speakers are now outside Europe.

In spite of the multiple influences of pre-Roman languages and later invasions, the phonology, morphology, lexicon, and syntax of all Romance languages are predominantly derived from Vulgar Latin. As a result, the group shares a number of linguistic features that set it apart from other Indo-European branches.

==== Ecclesiastical Latin ====
Ecclesiastical Latin (sometimes called Church Latin) is a broad and analogous term referring to the Latin language as used in documents of the Roman Catholic Church, its liturgies (mainly in past times) and during some periods the preaching of its ministers. Ecclesiastical Latin is not a single style: the term merely means the language promulgated at any time by the church. In terms of stylistic periods, it belongs to Late Latin in the Late Latin period, Medieval Latin in the Medieval Period, and so on through to the present. One may say that, starting from the church's decision in the early Late Latin period to use a simple and unornamented language that would be comprehensible to ordinary Latin speakers and yet still be elegant and correct, church Latin is usually a discernible substyle within the major style of the period. Its authors in the Neo-Latin period are typically paradigmatic of the best Latin and that is true in contemporary times. The decline in its use within the last 100 years has been a matter of regret to some, who have formed organizations inside and outside the church to support its use and to use it.

=== Medieval Latin ===
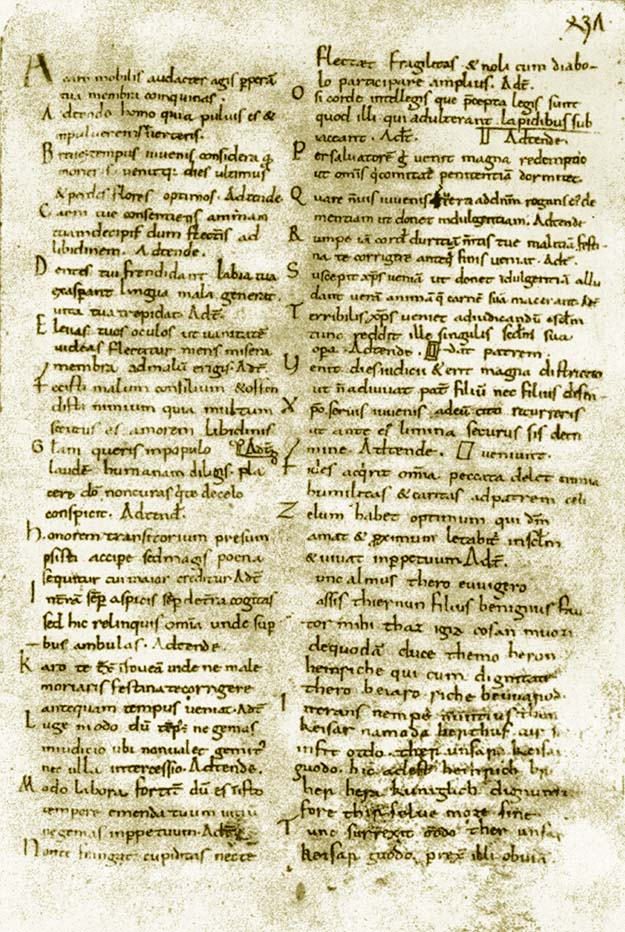
Page with medieval Latin text from the Carmina Cantabrigiensia (Cambridge University Library, Gg. 5. 35), 11th century

Medieval Latin, the literary and administrative Latin used in the Middle Ages, exhibits much variation between individual authors, mainly due to poor communications in those times between different regions. The individuality is characterised by a different range of solecisms and by the borrowing of different words from Vulgar Latin or from local vernaculars. Some styles show features intermediate between Latin and Romance languages; others are closer to classical Latin. The stylistic variations came to an end with the rise of nation states and new empires in the Renaissance period, and the authority of early universities imposing a new style: Renaissance Latin.

=== Renaissance and Neo-Latin ===
Renaissance Latin is a name given to the Latin written during the European Renaissance in the 14th-16th centuries, particularly distinguished by the distinctive Latin style developed by the humanist movement. Neo-Latin, or New Latin, is applied to Latin written after the medieval period according to the standards developed in the Renaissance; it is however a modern term. The field of Neo Latin studies has gained momentum in the last decades, as Latin was central to European cultural and scientific development in the period.

Ad fontes was the general cry of the humanists, and as such their Latin style sought to purge Latin of the medieval Latin vocabulary and stylistic accretions that it had acquired in the centuries after the fall of the Roman Empire. They looked to Golden Age Latin literature, and especially to Cicero in prose and Virgil in poetry, as the arbiters of Latin style. They abandoned the use of the sequence and other accentual forms of meter, and sought instead to revive the Greek formats that were used in Latin poetry during the Roman period. The humanists condemned the large body of medieval Latin literature as "gothic"—for them, a term of abuse—and believed instead that only ancient Latin from the Roman period was "real Latin".

The humanists also sought to purge written Latin of medieval developments in its orthography. They insisted, for example, that ae be written out in full wherever it occurred in classical Latin; medieval scribes often wrote e instead of ae. They were much more zealous than medieval Latin writers in distinguishing t from c: because the effects of palatalization made them homophones, medieval scribes often wrote, for example, eciam for etiam. Their reforms even affected handwriting: humanists usually wrote Latin in a script derived from Carolingian minuscule, the ultimate ancestor of most contemporary lower-case typefaces, avoiding the black-letter scripts used in the Middle Ages. Erasmus even proposed that the then-traditional pronunciations of Latin be abolished in favour of his reconstructed version of classical Latin pronunciation.

The humanist plan to remake Latin was largely successful, at least in education. Schools now taught the humanistic spellings, and encouraged the study of the texts selected by the humanists, largely to the exclusion of later Latin literature. On the other hand, while humanist Latin was an elegant literary language, it became much harder to write books about law, medicine, science or contemporary politics in Latin while observing all of the humanists' norms of vocabulary purging and classical usage. Humanist Latin continued to use neologisms, however; as a working language, it could not rely wholly on Classical vocabulary.

Their attempts at literary work, especially poetry, can be viewed as having a strong element of pastiche; however, many modern Latinists, lacking a deep knowledge of the works of the period, are prone to see the obvious links with Classical period authors, without necessarily seeing the interplay that would have been understood at the time, or may dismiss genres such as poetry for patrons and official events as lacking merit, because these are so far from our mental model of creative spontenaity based on individual emotional inspiration.

Latin continued to be significantly used in education, academia, government and literature through the 1500s and 1600s. It declined, at least in Western Europe, from about 1650 onwards, gradually giving way to vernacular languages. However, it remained important until at least 1800, and was a central part of education into the mid twentieth century.

Modern scholarly and technical nomenclature, such as in zoological and botanical taxonomy and international scientific vocabulary, draws extensively from Neo-Latin vocabulary.

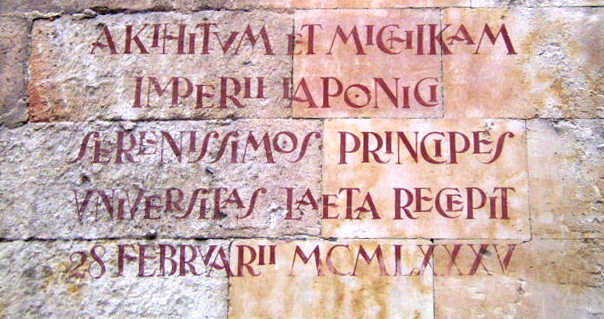
A contemporary Latin inscription at Salamanca University commemorating the visit of the then-Prince "Akihitus" and Princess "Michika" of Japan on 28 February 1985

In such use, Neo-Latin is subject to new word formation. As a language for full expression in prose or poetry, however, it is often distinguished from its successor, Contemporary Latin.

=== Contemporary Latin ===
Various kinds of contemporary Latin can be distinguished, including the use of single words in taxonomy, and the fuller ecclesiastical use in the Catholic Church.

As a relic of the great importance of Neo-Latin as the formerly dominant international lingua franca down to the 19th century in a great number of fields, Latin is still present in words or phrases used in many languages around the world, and some minor communities use Latin in their speech.

== Phonological changes ==
=== Vowels ===
Proto-Italic inherited all ten of the early post-Proto-Indo-European simple vowels (i.e. at a time when laryngeals had colored and often lengthened adjacent vowels and then disappeared in many circumstances): *i, *e, *a, *o, *u, *ī, *ē, *ā, *ō, *ū. It also inherited all of the post-PIE diphthongs except for *eu, which became *ou.

Proto-Italic and Old Latin had a stress accent on the first syllable of a word, and this caused steady reduction and eventual deletion of many short vowels in non-initial syllables while affecting initial syllables much less. Long vowels were largely unaffected in general except in final syllables, where they had a tendency to shorten.

Development of Proto-Italic vowels in Latin
	Initial	Medial						Final				
Proto-Italic	Initial	+r	+l pinguis	+labial (/p, b, f, m/)	+v (/w/)	+other		+one consonant			+cluster	absolutely final
Proto-Italic	Initial	+r	+l pinguis	+labial (/p, b, f, m/)	+v (/w/)	one consonant	cluster	s	m, n	other	+cluster	absolutely final
i	i	e (Note: Example: imberbis (from in + barba))	i?	ʏ (sonus medius) (Note: Examples: documentum, optimus, lacrima (also spelled docimentum, optumus, lacruma))	u	e > i (Note: Examples: inficere (from in + facere), oppidum (from ob + pedum, borrowed from Gr. πέδον))	i (Note: Example: invictus (from in + victus))	i	e	i	e	e
e	e	e	o > u (Note: Examples: occultus (from ob + cel(a)tus), multus (from PIE *mel-))	ʏ (sonus medius)	u	e > i	e (Note: Examples: exspectare (from ex + spectare), ineptus (from in + aptus), infectus (from in + factus))	i	e	i	e	e
a	a	e	o > u (Note: Example: exsultare (from ex + saltare))	ʏ (sonus medius)	u	e > i	e	i	e	i	e	e
o	o	e	o > u (Note: Example: cultus (participle of colō))	ʏ (sonus medius)	u	e > i	o > u (Note: Example: euntis from *eontes)	u				e
u	u	e	u (Note: Example: exculpare (from ex + culpare))	ʏ (sonus medius)	u	e > i	u (Note: Example: eruptus (from e + ruptus))	u				e
ī	ī								i			ī?
ē	ē								e			ē?
ā	ā								a			a, ā
ō	ō								o			ō
ū	ū								u			ū?
ei	ī											
ai	ae	ī										
oi	ū, oe	ū						ī				
au	au	ū										
ou	ū											

Notes:

Note: For the following examples, it helps to keep in mind the normal correspondences between PIE and certain other languages:

Development of some Proto-Indo-European sounds in other languages
(post-)PIE	Ancient Greek	Sanskrit	Gothic	Old English	Notes
*i	i	i	i, aí /ɛ/	i	
*e	e	a	i, aí /ɛ/	e	
*a	a	a	a	a	
*o	o	a	a	a	
*u	u	u	u, aú /ɔ/	u, o	
*ī	ī	ī	ei /ī/	ī	
*ē	ē	ā	ē	ā	
*ā	ā; ē (Attic)	ā	ō	ō	
*ō	ō	ā	ō	ō	
*ū	ū	ū	ū	ū	
*ei	ei	ē	ei /ī/	ī	
*ai	ai	ē	ái	ā	
*oi	oi	ē	ái	ā	
*eu	eu	ō	iu	ēo	
*au	au	ō	áu	ēa	
*ou	ou	ō	áu	ēa	
*p	p	p	f; b	f	b in Gothic by Verner's law
*t	t	t	þ; d	þ/ð; d	þ and ð are different graphs for the same sound; d in the Germanic languages by Verner's law
*ḱ	k	ś	h; g	h; g	g in the Germanic languages by Verner's law
*k	k	k; c (+ PIE e/i)	h; g	h; g	
*kʷ	p; t (+ e/i)	k; c (+ PIE e/i)	ƕ /hʷ/; g, w, gw	hw, h; g, w	g, w, gw in the Germanic languages by Verner's law
*b	b	b	p	p	
*d	d	d	t	t	
*ǵ	g	j	k	k	
*g	g	g; j (+ PIE e/i)	k	k	
*gʷ	b; d (+ i)	g; j (+ PIE e/i)	q	q, c	
*bʰ	ph; p	bh; b	b	b	Greek p, Sanskrit b before any aspirated consonant (Grassmann's law)
*dʰ	th; t	dh; d	d	d	Greek t, Sanskrit d before any aspirated consonant
*ǵʰ	kh; k	h; j	g	g	Greek k, Sanskrit j before any aspirated consonant
*gʰ	kh; k	gh; g h; j (+ PIE e/i)	g	g	Greek k, Sanskrit g, j before any aspirated consonant
*gʷʰ	ph; p th; t (+ e/i)	gh; g h; j (+ PIE e/i)	b (word-initially); g, w, gw	b (word-initially); g, w	Greek p, t, Sanskrit g, j before any aspirated consonant
*s	h (word-initially); s, -	s, ṣ	s; z	s; r	r, z in Germanic by Verner's law; Sanskrit ṣ by Ruki sound law
*y	h, z (word-initially); -	y	j /j/	g(e) /j/	
*w	-	v	w	w	

==== Monophthongs ====
===== Initial syllables =====
In initial syllables, Latin generally preserves all of the simple vowels of Proto-Italic (see above):

- PIE *ǵneh₃tós "known" > *gnōtos > nōtus (i-gnōtus "unknown"; Welsh gnawd "customary", Sanskrit jñātá-; Greek gnōtós (Note: Greek is ambiguously either < *gneh₃tós or *gn̥h₃tós))})
- PIE *gʷih₃wós "alive" > *gʷīwos > vīvus (Old English cwic, English quick, Greek bíos "life", Sanskrit jīvá-, Slavic živъ)
- PIE *h₂eǵros "field" > *agros > ager, gen. agrī (Greek agrós, English acre, Sanskrit ájra-)
- PIE *kápros "he-goat" > *kapros > caper "he-goat", gen. caprī (Greek kápros "boar", Old English hæfer "he-goat", Sanskrit kápṛth "penis")
- PIE *kʷís "who?" > *kʷis > quis (Greek tís, (Note: *kʷi- > ti- is normal in Attic Greek; Thessalian Greek had kís while Cypro-Arcadian had sís.) Avestan čiš, Sanskrit kís)
- PIE *kʷód "what, that" > *kʷod > quod (relative) (Old English hwæt "what", Sanskrit kád)
- PIE *méh₂tēr "mother" > *mātēr > māter (Doric Greek mā́tēr, Old Irish máthir, Sanskrit mā́tṛ)
- PIE *múh₂s "mouse" > *mūs > mūs (Old English mūs, Greek mûs, Sanskrit mū́ṣ)
- PIE *nókʷts "night" > *noks > nox, gen. noctis (Greek nuks < *nokʷs, Sanskrit nákt- < *nákts, Lithuanian naktìs)
- PIE *oḱtṓ "eight" > *oktō > octō (Greek oktṓ, Irish ocht, Sanskrit aṣṭā́)
- PIE *sēmi- "half" > *sēmi- > sēmi- (Greek hēmi-, Old English sām-, Sanskrit sāmí)
- PIE *sweh₂dús "pleasing, tasty" > *swādus > *swādwis (remade into i-stem) > suāvis (Doric Greek hādús, English sweet, Sanskrit svādú-)
- PIE *swéḱs "six", septḿ̥ "seven" > *seks, *septem > sex, septem (Greek heks, heptá, Lithuanian šešì, septynì, Sanskrit ṣáṣ, saptá-)
- PIE *yugóm "yoke" > *jugom > iugum (Greek zugón, Gothic juk, Sanskrit yugá-)

Short vowel changes in initial syllables:

1. *e > i before [ŋ] (spelled n before a velar, or g before n):
  - PIE *deḱnós > *degnos > dignus "worthy"
  - PIE *dn̥ǵʰwéh₂s > *denɣwā > Old Latin dingua > lingua "tongue" (l- from lingō "to lick")
2. *swe- > so-:
  - *swepnos > *suopnos > *sopnos > somnus "sleep"
  - *sweðalis > suodalis > sodalis "comrade"
3. *we- > wo-, later followed by wo- > we- except before labial consonants or velarized l [ɫ] (l pinguis; i.e. an l not followed by i, ī or l):
  - *welō > volō "I want" (vs. velim "I would want")
  - *wemō > vomō "I vomit"
  - *westeros > voster > vester "your, of you (pl)"

There are numerous examples where PIE *o appears to result in Latin a instead of expected o, mostly next to labial or labializing consonants. A group of cases showing *-ow- > *-aw- > -av- (before stress), *-ōw- > *-āw- > -āv- is known as Thurneysen–Havet's law: examples include:

- PIE *lowh₃ṓ > *lawō > lavō 'I wash'
- PIE *oḱtṓwos > *oktāwos > octāvus 'eighth' (but octō 'eight')

Other cases remain more disputed, such as:

- lacus 'lake', in contrast to Irish loch < PIE *lókus
- mare 'sea', in contrast to Irish muir, Welsh môr (Proto-Celtic *mori) < PIE *móri

De Vaan suggests a general shift *o > a in open syllables when preceded by any of *b, *m; *kʷ, *w; *l. Vine (2011) disputes the cases with *moCV, but proposes inversely that *mo- > ma- when followed by r plus a velar (k or g).

===== Medial syllables =====
In non-initial syllables, there was more vowel reduction of short vowels. The most extreme case occurs with short vowels in medial syllables (i.e. short vowels in a syllable that is neither the first nor the last), where all five vowels usually merge into a single vowel:

1. They merge into e before r (sometimes original o is unaffected)

- *en-armis > inermis "unarmed" (vs. arma "arms")
- *Falisiōi > Faleriī "Falerii (major town of the Faliscans)" (vs. Faliscus "Faliscan")
- *-foro- "carrying" (cf. Greek -phóros) > -fero-, e.g. furcifer "gallows bird"
- *kinis-es "ash" (gen.sg.) > cineris (vs. nom.sg. cinis)
- *kom-gesō > congerō "to collect" (vs. gerō "to do, carry out")
- Latin-Faliscan Numasiōi (Praeneste fibula) > Numeriō "for Numerius"
- Latin-Faliscan *pe-par-ai "I gave birth" > peperī (vs. pariō "I give birth")
- PIE *swéḱuros "father-in-law" > *swekuros > *swokuros > *soceros > socer, gen. socerī

2. They become Old Latin o > u before l pinguis, i.e., an l not followed by i, ī, or l:

- *ad-alēskō "to grow up" > adolēscō > adulēscō (vs. alō "I nourish")
- *en-saltō "to leap upon" > īnsoltō (with lengthening before ns) > īnsultō (vs. saltō "I leap")
- PIE *-kl̥d-to- "beaten" > *-kolsso- (Note: l̥ > ol is normal in Proto-Italic.) > perculsus "beaten down"
- *kom-solō "deliberate" > cōnsulō
- *ob-kelō "to conceal" > occulō (vs. celō "I hide")
- Greek Sikelós "a Sicilian" > *Sikolos > Siculus (vs. Sicilia "Sicily")
- *te-tol-ai > tetulī "I carried" (formerly l pinguis here because of the original final -ai)

3. But they remain o before l pinguis when immediately following a vowel:

- Latin-Faliscan *fili-olos > filiolus "little son"
- Similarly, alveolus "trough"

4. Before /w/ the result is always u, in which case the /w/ is not written:

- *dē nowōd "anew" > dēnuō
- *eks-lawō "I wash away" > ēluō
- *mon-i-wai "I warned" > monuī
- *tris-diw-om "period of three days" > trīduom > trīduum

5. They become i before one consonant other than r or l pinguis:

- *ad-tenējō > attineō "to concern" (vs. teneō "I hold")
- *kaput-es "head" (gen. sg.) > capitis (vs. nom.sg. caput)
- Latin-Faliscan *ke-kad-ai "I fell" > cecidī (vs. cadō "I fall")
- *kom-itājō "accompany" > comitō
- *kom-regō > corrigō "to set right, correct" (vs. regō "I rule; straighten")
- *kornu-kan- "trumpeter" > cornicen
- PIE *me-món-h₂e (perfect) "thought, pondered" > Latin-Faliscan *me-mon-ai > meminī "I remember"
- *nowotāts "newness" > novitās
- Greek Sikelía "Sicily" > Sicilia (vs. Siculus "a Sicilian")
- *wre-fakjō "to remake" > *refakiō > reficiō (vs. faciō "I do, make")

6. But they sometimes become e before one consonant other than r or l pinguis, when immediately following a vowel:

- *sokiotāts "fellowship" > societās
- *wariogājesi "to make diverse" > variegāre
- But: *medio-diēs "midday" > *meriodiēs (dissimilative rhotacism) > *meriidiēs > merīdiēs "noon; south"
- But: *tībia-kan- "flute-player" > *tībiikan- > tībīcen

7. Variation between i and (often earlier) u is common before a single labial consonant (p, b, f, m), underlyingly the sonus medius vowel:

- From the root *-kap- "grab, catch":
  - occupō "seize" vs. occipiō "begin"
  - From the related noun *-kaps "catcher": prīnceps "chief" (lit. "seizer of the first (position)"), gen. prīncipis, vs. auceps "bird catcher", gen. aucupis
  - *man-kapiom > mancupium "purchase", later mancipium
- *mag-is-emos > maxumus "biggest", later maximus; similarly proxumus "nearest", optumus "best" vs. later proximus, optimus
- *pot-s-omos > possumus "we can"; *vel-omos > volumus "we want"; but *leg-omos > legimus "we gather", and all other such verbs (-umus is isolated in sumus, possumus and volumus)
- *sub-rapuit > surrupuit "filches", later surripuit

Medially before two consonants, when the first is not r or l pinguis, the vowels do not merge to the same degree:

1. Original a, e and u merge into e:

- *ad-tentos > attentus "concerned" (cf. tentus "held", attineō "to concern")
- *sub-raptos "filched" > surreptus (vs. raptus "seized")
- Greek tálanton > *talantom > talentum
- *wre-faktos "remade" > refectus (cf. factus "made")
- *kom-dapn-ō > condemnō "convict" (cf. damnō "disapprove")

2. But original i is unaffected:

- *wre-likʷtos "left (behind)" > relictus

3. And original o raises to u:

- *ejontes "going" (gen. sg.) > euntis
- *legontor "they gather" > leguntur
- *rōbos-to- > rōbustus "oaken" (cf. rōbur "oak" < *rōbos)

====== Syncope ======
Exon's law, named after Charles Exon, dictates that if there are two light medial syllables in a row (schematically, σσ̆σ̆σ, where σ = syllable and σ̆ = light syllable, where "light" means a short vowel followed by only a single consonant), the first syllable syncopates (i.e. the vowel is deleted):

- *deksiteros "right (hand)" > dexterus (cf. Greek deksiterós)
- *magisemos > maximus "biggest" (cf. magis "more")
- *priismo-kapes > prīncipis "prince" gen. sg. (nom. sg. prīnceps < *priismo-kaps by analogy)
- *wre-peparai > repperī "I found" (cf. peperī "I gave birth" < *peparai)

Syncopation tends to occur after r and l in all non-initial syllables, sometimes even in initial syllables.

- *agros "field" > *agr̩s > *agers > *agerr > ager
- *faklitāts > facultās
- *feret "he carries" > fert
- *imbris "rainstorm" > *imbers > imber
- *austeros > *austers > *austerr > auster "south wind"
- *tris "three times" > *tr̩s > *ters > Old Latin terr > ter

Sometimes early syncope causes apparent violations of Exon's Law:

- kosolinos "of hazel" > *kozolnos (not **koslinos) > *korolnos > *korulnos (o > u before l pinguis, see above) > colurnus (metathesis)

Syncope of -i- also occurred in -ndis, -ntis and -rtis. -nts then became -ns with lengthening of the preceding vowel, while -rts was simplified to -rs without lengthening.

- *frondis "leaf" > *fronts > frōns
- *gentis "tribe" > *gents > gēns
- *montis "hill" > *monts > mōns
- *partis "part" > *parts > pars

===== Final syllables =====
In final syllables of polysyllabic words before a final consonant or cluster, short a, e, i merge into either e or i depending on the following consonant, and short o, u merge into u.

1. Short a, e, i merge into i before a single non-nasal consonant:

- PIE thematic 2nd/3rd sg. *-esi, *-eti > PI *-es, *-et > -is, -it (e.g. legis, legit "you gather, he gathers")
- Proto-Italic *wrededas, *wrededat > reddis, reddit "you return, he returns"
- i-stem nom. sg. *-is > -is

2. Short a, e, i merge into e before a cluster or a single nasal consonant:

- *in-art-is > iners "unskilled" (cf. ars "skill")
- *kornu-kan-(?s) > cornicen "trumpeter" (cf. canō "to sing")
- *mīlets > mīles "soldier"
- *priismo-kaps > prīnceps "first, chief" (cf. capiō "to take")
- *septḿ̥ > septem "seven"
- i-stem acc. sg. *-im > -em

3. Short o, u merge into u:

- o-stem accusative *-om > Old Latin -om > -um
- o-stem nominative *-os > Old Latin -os > -us
- PIE thematic 3rd sg. mediopassive *-etor > -itur
- PIE thematic 3rd pl. *-onti > *-ont > -unt
- *kaput > caput "head"
- PIE *yekʷr̥ > *jekʷor > iecur "liver"

4. All short vowels apparently merge into -e in absolute final position.

- 2nd sg. passive -ezo, -āzo > -ere, -āre
- Proto-Italic *kʷenkʷe > quīnque "five"
- PIE *móri > PI *mari > mare "sea" (cf. plural maria)
- PI s-stem verbal nouns in *-zi > infinitives in -re
- But: u-stem neuter nom./acc. sg. *-u > -ū, apparently by analogy with gen. sg. -ūs, dat./abl. sg. -ū (it is not known if this change occurred already in Proto-Italic)

Long vowels in final syllables shorten before most consonants (but not final s), yielding apparent exceptions to the above rules:

- a-stem acc. sg. *-ām > -am
- Proto-Italic *amānt > amant "they love"
- Proto-Italic *amāt > amat "he/she loves" (cf. passive amātur)
- PIE thematic 1st sg. mediopassive *-ōr > -or
- *swesōr > soror "sister" (cf. gen. sorōris)

Absolutely final long vowels are apparently maintained with the exception of ā, which is shortened in the 1st declension nominative singular and the neuter plural ending (both < PIE *-eh₂) but maintained in the 1st conjugation 2nd sg. imperative (< PIE *-eh₂-yé).

==== Diphthongs ====
===== Initial syllables =====
Proto-Italic maintained all PIE diphthongs except for the change *eu > *ou. The Proto-Italic diphthongs tend to remain into Old Latin but generally reduce to pure long vowels by Classical Latin.

1. PIE *ei > Old Latin ei > ẹ̄, a vowel higher than ē < PIE *ē. This then developed to ī normally, but to ē before v:

- PIE *bʰeydʰ- "be persuaded, be confident" > *feiðe- > fīdō "to trust"
- PIE *deiḱ- "point (out)" > Old Latin deicō > dīcō "to say"
- PIE *deiwós "god, deity" > Very Old Latin deiuos (Duenos inscription) > dẹ̄vos > deus (cf. dīvus "divine, godlike, godly")
- But nominative plural *deivoi > *deivei > *dẹ̄vẹ̄ > dīvī > diī; vocative singular *deive > *dẹ̄ve > dīve

2. PIE (*h₂ei >) *ai > ae:

- PIE *kh₂ei-ko- > *kaiko- > caecus "blind" (cf. Old Irish cáech /kaiχ/ "blind", Gothic háihs "one-eyed", Sanskrit kekara- "squinting")

3. PIE *oi > Old Latin oi, oe > ū (occasionally preserved as oe):

- PIE *h₁oi-nos > Old Latin oinos > oenus > ūnus "one"
- Greek Phoiniks > Pūnicus "Phoenician"
- But: PIE *bʰoidʰ- > *foiðo- > foedus "treaty" (cf. fīdō above)

4. PIE *eu, *ou > Proto-Italic *ou > Old Latin ou > ọ̄ (higher than ō < PIE *ō) > ū:

- PIE *deuk- > *douk-e- > Old Latin doucō > dūcō "lead"
- PIE *louk-s-neh₂ > *louksnā > Old Latin losna (i.e. lọ̄sna) > lūna "moon" (cf. Old Prussian lauxnos "stars", Avestan raoχšnā "lantern")
- PIE *(H)yeug- "join" > *youg-s-mn̥-to- > Old Latin iouxmentom "pack horse" > iūmentum

5. PIE (*h₂eu >) *au > au:

- PIE *h₂eug- > *augeje/o > augeō "to increase" (cf. Greek aúksō, Gothic áukan, Lithuanian áugti).

===== Medial syllables =====
All diphthongs in medial syllables become ī or ū.

1. (Post-)PIE *ei > ī, just as in initial syllables:

- *en-deik-ō > indīcō "to point out" (cf. dīcō "to say")

2. Post-PIE *ai > Old Latin ei > ī:

- *en-kaid-ō "cut into" > incīdō (cf. caedō "cut")
- *ke-kaid-ai "I cut", perf. > cecīdī (cf. caedō "I cut", pres.)
- Early Greek (or from an earlier source) *elaíwā "olive" > olīva

3. (Post-)PIE *oi > ū, just as in initial syllables:

- PIE *n̥-poini "with impunity" > impūne (cf. poena "punishment")

4. (Post-)PIE *eu, *ou > Proto-Italic *ou > ū, just as in initial syllables:

- *en-deuk-ō > *indoucō > indūcō "to draw over, cover" (cf. dūcō "to lead")

5. Post-PIE *au > ū (rarely oe):

- *ad-kauss-ō "accuse" > accūsō (cf. causa "cause")
- *en-klaud-ō "enclose" > inclūdō (cf. claudō "close")
- *ob-aud-iō "obey" > oboediō (cf. audiō "hear").

===== Final syllables =====
Mostly like medial syllables:

- *-ei > ī: PIE *meh₂tr-ei "to mother" > mātrī
- *-ai > ī in multisyllabic words: Latin-Faliscan peparai "I brought forth" > peperī
- *-eu/ou- > ū: post-PIE manous "hand", gen. sg. > manūs

Different from medial syllables:

- -ai > ae in monosyllables: PIE *prh₂ei "before" > prae (cf. Greek paraí)
- -oi > Old Latin -ei > ī (not ū): PIE o-stem plural *-oi > -ī (cf. Greek -oi);
- -oi > ī also in monosyllables: PIE *kʷoi "who" > quī.

==== Syllabic resonants and laryngeals ====
The PIE syllabic resonants *m̥, *n̥, *r̥, *l̥ generally become em, en, or, ol (Note: These short vowels are then subject to the normal rules of vowel reduction in non-initial syllables.) (cf. Greek am/a, an/a, ar/ra, al/la; Germanic um, un, ur, ul; Sanskrit am/a, an/a, r̥, r̥; Lithuanian im̃, iñ, ir̃, il̃):

- PIE *déḱm̥(t) "ten" > decem (cf. Irish deich, Greek deka, Gothic taíhun /tɛhun/)
- PIE *(d)ḱm̥tóm "hundred" > centum (cf. Welsh cant, Gothic hund, Lithuanian šim̃tas, Sanskrit śatám)
- PIE *n̥- "not" > OL en- > in- (cf. Greek a-/an-, English un-, Sanskrit a-, an-)
- PIE *tn̥tós "stretched" > tentus (cf. Greek tatós, Sanskrit tatá-)
- PIE *ḱr̥d- "heart" > *cord > cor (cf. Greek kēr, English heart, Lithuanian širdìs, Sanskrit hṛd-)
- PIE *ml̥dús "soft" > *moldus > *moldwis (remade as i-stem) > *molwis > mollis (cf. Irish meldach "pleasing", English mild, Czech mladý)

The laryngeals *h₁, *h₂, *h₃ appear in Latin as a when between consonants, as in most languages (but Greek e/a/o respectively, Sanskrit i):

- PIE *dʰh₁-tós "put" > L factus, with /k/ of disputed etymology (cf. Greek thetós, Sanskrit hitá- < *dhitá-)
- PIE *ph₂tḗr "father" > L pater (cf. Greek patḗr, Sanskrit pitṛ́, English father)
- PIE *dh₃-tós "given" > L datus (cf. Greek dotós, Sanskrit ditá-)

A sequence of syllabic resonant + laryngeal, when before a consonant, produced mā, nā, rā, lā (as also in Celtic, cf. Greek nē/nā/nō, rē/rā/rō, etc. depending on the laryngeal; Germanic um, un, ur, ul; Sanskrit ā, ā, īr/ūr, īr/ūr; Lithuanian ím, ín, ír, íl):

- PIE *ǵn̥h₁-tos "born" > gnātus "son", nātus "born" (participle) (cf. Middle Welsh gnawt "relative", Greek dió-gnētos "Zeus' offspring", Sanskrit jātá-, English kind, kin)
- PIE *ǵr̥h₂-nom "grain" > grānum (cf. Old Irish grán, English corn, Lithuanian žìrnis "pea", jīrṇá- "old, worn out")
- PIE *h₂wl̥h₁-neh₂ "wool" > *wlānā > lāna (cf. Welsh gwlân, Gothic wulla, Greek lēnos, Lithuanian vìlna, Sanskrit ū́rṇa-)

=== Consonants ===
==== Aspirates ====
The Indo-European voiced aspirates bʰ, dʰ, gʰ, gʷʰ, which were probably breathy voiced stops, first devoiced in initial position (fortition), then fricatized in all positions, producing pairs of voiceless/voiced fricatives in Proto-Italic: f ~ β, θ ~ ð, χ ~ ɣ, χʷ ~ ɣʷ respectively. The fricatives were voiceless in initial position. However, between vowels and other voiced sounds, there are indications—in particular, their evolution in Latin—that the sounds were actually voiced. Likewise, Proto-Italic /s/ apparently had a voiced allophone [z] in the same position.

In all Italic languages, the word-initial voiceless fricatives f, θ, and χʷ all merged to f, whereas χ debuccalized to h (except before a liquid where it became g); thus, in Latin, the normal outcome of initial PIE *bʰ, *dʰ, *gʰ, *gʷʰ is f, f, h, f, respectively. Examples:

- PIE *bʰér-e- "carry" > ferō (cf. Old Irish beirid "bears", English bear, Sanskrit bhárati)
- PIE *bʰréh₂tēr "brother" > *bʰrā́tēr > frāter (cf. Old Irish bráthair, Sanskrit bhrā́tar-, Greek phrā́tēr "member of a phratry")
- PIE *dʰeh₁- "put, place" > *dʰh₁-k- > *θaki- > faciō "do, make" (cf. Welsh dodi, English do, Greek títhēmi "I put", Sanskrit dádhāti he puts")
- PIE *dʰwṓr "door" > *θwor- > *forā > forēs (pl.) "door(s)" (cf. Welsh dôr, Greek thurā, Sanskrit dvā́ra- (pl.))
- PIE *gʰabʰ- "seize, take" > *χaβ-ē- > habeō "have" (cf. Old Irish gaibid "takes", Old English gifan "to give", Polish gabać "to seize")
- PIE *ǵʰaidos "goat" > *χaidos > haedus "kid" (cf. Old English gāt "goat", Polish zając "hare", Sanskrit háyas "horse")
- PIE *ǵʰh₂ens "goose" > *χans- > (h)ānser (cf. Old Irish géiss "swan", German Gans, Greek khḗn, Sanskrit haṃsá-)
- PIE *gʰlh₂dʰ-rós "shining, smooth" > *χlaðros > *glabrus > glaber "smooth" (cf. Polish gładki "smooth", Old English glæd "bright, glad")
- PIE *gʷʰen-dʰ- "to strike, kill" > *χʷ(e)nð- > fendō (cf. Welsh gwanu "to stab", Old High German gundo "battle", Sanskrit hánti "(he) strikes, kills", -ghna "killer (used in compounds)" )
- PIE *gʷʰerm- "warm" > *χʷormo- > formus (cf. Old Prussian gorme "heat", Greek thermós, Sanskrit gharmá- "heat")

Word-internal *-bʰ-, *-dʰ-, *-gʰ-, *-gʷʰ- evolved into Proto-Italic β, ð, ɣ, ɣʷ. In Osco-Umbrian, the same type of merger occurred as that affecting voiceless fricatives, with β, ð, and ɣʷ merging to β. In Latin, this did not happen, and instead the fricatives defricatized, giving b, d ~ b, g ~ h, g ~ v ~ gu.

*-bʰ- is the simplest case, consistently becoming b.

- PIE *bʰébʰrus "beaver" > *feβro > Old Latin feber > fiber

*-dʰ- usually becomes d, but becomes b next to r or u, or before l.

- PIE *bʰeidʰ- "be persuaded" > *feiðe > fīdō "I trust" (cf. Old English bīdan "to wait", Greek peíthō "I trust")
- PIE *medʰi-o- "middle" > *meðio- > medius (cf. Old Irish mide, Gothic midjis, Sanskrit mádhya-)
- PIE *krei(H)-dʰrom "sieve, sifter" > *kreiðrom > crībrum "sieve" (cf. Old English hrīder "sieve")
- PIE *h₁rudʰ-ró- "red" > *ruðro- > ruber (cf. Old Russian rodrŭ, Greek eruthrós, Sanskrit rudhirá-)
- PIE *sth̥₂-dʰlom > *staðlom > stabulum "abode" (cf. German Stadel)
- PIE *werh₁-dʰh₁-o- "word" > *werðo- > verbum (cf. English word, Lithuanian var̃das)

The development of *-gʰ- is twofold: *-gʰ- becomes h [ɦ] between vowels but g elsewhere:

- PIE *weǵʰ- "carry" > *weɣ-e/o > vehō (cf. Greek okhéomai "I ride", Old English wegan "to carry", Sanskrit váhati "(he) drives")
- PIE *dʰi-n-ǵʰ- "shapes, forms" > *θinɣ-e/o > fingō (cf. Old Irish -ding "erects, builds", Gothic digan "to mold, shape")

*-gʷʰ- has three outcomes, becoming gu after n, v between vowels, and g next to other consonants. All three variants are visible in the same root *snigʷʰ- "snow" (cf. Irish snigid "snows", Greek nípha):

- PIE *snei-gʷʰ-e/o > *sninɣʷ-e/o (with n-infix) > ninguit "it snows"
- PIE *snigʷʰ-ós > *sniɣʷos > gen. sg. nivis "of snow"
- PIE *snigʷʰ-s > *sniɣʷs > nom. sg. nix (i.e. /nig-s/) "snow"

Other examples:

- PIE *h₁le(n)gʷʰu- > *h₁legʷʰu- > *leɣʷus > *leɣʷis (remade as i-stem) > levis "lightweight" (cf. Welsh llaw "small, low", Greek elakhús "small", Sanskrit laghú-, raghú- "quick, light, small")

==== Labiovelars ====
*gʷ has results much like non-initial *-gʷʰ-, becoming v /w/ in most circumstances, but gu after a nasal and g next to other consonants:

- PIE *gʷih₃wos > *ɣʷīwos > vīvus "alive" (cf. Old Irish biu, beo, Lithuanian gývas, Sanskrit jīvá- "alive")
- PIE *gʷm̥i̯e/o- "come" > *ɣʷen-je/o > veniō (cf. English come, Greek baínō "I go", Avestan ǰamaiti "he goes", Sanskrit gam- "go")
- PIE *gʷr̥h₂us "heavy" > *ɣʷraus > grāvis (cf. Greek barús, Gothic kaúrus, Sanskrit gurú-)
- PIE *h₃engʷ- > *onɣʷ-en > unguen "salve" (cf. Old Irish imb "butter", Old High German ancho "butter", Sanskrit añjana- "anointing, ointment")
- PIE *n̥gʷén- "(swollen) gland" > *enɣʷen > inguen "bubo; groin" (cf. Greek adḗn gen. adénos "gland", Old High German ankweiz "pustules")

*kʷ remains as qu before a vowel, but reduces to c /k/ before a consonant or next to a u:

- PIE *kʷetwóres, neut. *kʷetwṓr "four" > quattuor (cf. Old Irish cethair, Lithuanian keturì, Sanskrit catvā́r-)
- PIE *leikʷ- (pres. *li-né-kʷ-) "leave behind" > *linkʷ-e/o- : *likʷ-ē- > linquō "leaves" : liceō "is allowed; is for sale" (cf. Greek leípō, limpánō, Sanskrit riṇákti, Gothic leiƕan "to lend")
- PIE *nokʷts "night" > nox, gen. sg. noctis
- PIE *sekʷ- "to follow" > sequor (cf. Old Irish sechem, Greek hépomai, Sanskrit sácate)

The sequence *p *kʷ assimilates to *kʷ *kʷ, an innovation shared with Celtic:

- PIE *pekʷō "I cook" > *kʷekʷō > coquō (cf. coquīna, cocīnā "kitchen" vs. popīna "tavern" < Oscan, where *kʷ > p, Polish piekę "I bake", Sanskrit pacati "cooks")
- PIE *pénkʷe "five" > quīnque (cf. Old Irish cóic, Greek pénte, Sanskrit páñca-)
- PIE *pérkʷus "oak" > quercus (cf. Trentino porca "fir", Punjabi pargāī "holm oak", Gothic faírƕus "world", faírgun- "mountain" (Note: Both "world" and "mountain" evolve out of the early association of oak trees with strength, cf. Latin robur = "oak" but also "strength"))

The sequences *ḱw, *ǵw, *ǵʰw develop identically to *kʷ, *gʷ, *gʷʰ:

- PIE *dn̥ǵʰwéh₂ (Note: PIE *dn̥ǵhwéh₂; -ǵʰw- not -gʷʰ- indicated by Old Church Slavonic języ-kŭ "tongue" < *n̥ǵhu-H-k- with loss of initial *d-; -gʷʰ- would yield /g/, not /z/.) "tongue" > *dn̥ɣwā > *denɣʷā > Old Latin dingua > lingua
- PIE *éḱwos "horse" > *ekʷos > Old Latin equos > ecus > equus (assimilated from other forms, e.g. gen. sg. equī; cf. Sanskrit aśva-, which indicates -ḱw- not -kʷ-)
- PIE *ǵʰweh₁ro- "wild animal" > *χʷero- > ferus (cf. Greek thḗr, Lesbian phḗr, Lithuanian žvėrìs)
- PIE *mreǵʰus "short" > *mreɣu- > *mreɣʷi- (remade as i-stem) > brevis (cf. Old English myrge "briefly", English merry, Greek brakhús, Avestan mǝrǝzu-, Sanskrit múhu "suddenly")

==== S-rhotacism ====
Indo-European s between vowels was first voiced to [z] in late Proto-Italic and became r in Latin and Umbrian, a change known as rhotacism. Early Old Latin documents still have s [z], and Cicero once remarked that a certain Papirius Crassus officially changed his name from Papisius in 339 BC, indicating the approximate time of this change. This produces many alternations in Latin declension:

- est "he is", fut. erit "he will be"
- flōs "flower", gen. flōris
- mūs "mouse", pl. mūrēs

Other examples:

- Proto-Italic *a(j)os, a(j)esem > *aes, aezem > aes, aerem "bronze", but PI *a(j)es-inos > *aeznos > aēnus "bronze (adj.)"
- Proto-Italic *ausōs, ausōsem > *auzōs, auzōzem > aurōra "dawn" (change of suffix; cf. English east, Aeolic Greek aúōs, Sanskrit uṣā́s)
- Proto-Italic *swesōr > *swozōr > soror "sister" (cf. Old English sweostor, Sanskrit svásar)

However, before another r, dissimilation occurred with sr [zr] becoming br (likely via an intermediate *ðr):

- Proto-Italic *keras-rom > *kerazrom ~ *keraðrom > cerebrum "skull, brain" (cf. Greek kéras "horn")
- Proto-Italic *swesr-īnos > *swezrīnos ~ *sweðrīnos > sobrīnus "maternal cousin"

==== Elision ====
In groups of stop + /s/ before unvoiced consonants, the stop was lost:

- Proto-italic *subs-teneō > latin susteneō "hold up"

Syncopated words like dexter (<*deksiteros) were not affected by this change. Additionally, words beginning with recognizable prepositions like ex- or ob- frequently restored the stop.

/s/ was lost before voiced consonants, with compensatory lengthening:

- Proto-italic *is-dem > latin īdem "same"

Clusters involving /s/ were also lost before voiced consonants, also with compensatory lengthening:

- Proto-italic *eks-dowkō > *es-dowkō > latin ēdūcō "draw out"

==== Assimilation ====
Sequences of dl, nl, rl, ln, ls, and lw became ll:

- Proto-Italic *sedlā > Latin sella "seat"
- Proto-Italic *saldō > Latin sallō "Salt"
- Proto-Italic *korōnelā > *korōnlā > Latin corōlla "wreath" (diminutive of corōnā "crown")
- Proto-Italic *kolnis > Latin collis "hill"
- Proto-Italic *agrolos > *agrlos > *agerlos > Latin agellus "little field" (diminutive of ager "field")
- Proto-Italic *wel-esi > *welsi > Latin velle "to want"
- Proto-Italic *moldwis > *molwis > Latin mollis

As shown by agellus this assimilation occurred after syncopation.

Original sequences of rs (i.e not derived from other sources or from syncopation) became rr:

- Proto-Italic *fer-esi > *fersi > Latin ferre "to carry"

Sequences of nr become rr:

- Proto-Italic *in-regō > Latin irrigō "direct water to a place"

Sequences of pm and pn become mm and mn respectively:

- Proto-Italic *supmos > Latin summus "highest, top"
- Proto-Italic *swepnos > Latin somnus "sleep"

Sequences of tn become nn:

- Proto-Italic *petnā > Latin penna "feather"
- Proto-Italic *atnos > Latin annus "year"

Sequences of tl become l initially but kl intervocalically:

- Proto-Italic *tlātos (past participle of *tolnō) > Latin lātus "borne, carried"
- Proto-Italic *stlokos > *slokos > Latin locus "place"
- Proto-Italic *pōtlom > Latin pōclum "wine cup" (later pōculum by analogy with other nouns in -ulum)

This change remained productive in Latin, as seen by Classical vetulus "old" becoming Vulgar Latin veclus after syncope.

==== Other ====
/k/ became /g/ before /n/ (possibly later becoming [ŋn]); word initially this /g/ (no matter its source) was also often later dropped:

- PIE *deḱnós > *degnos > dignus "worthy"
- Early Latin gnōscō > nōscō "to understand"

Final /d/ was lost after long vowels beginning in the late 3rd century BCE:

- PIE masc. ablative singular *-ead > -ōd > -ō
- PIE *meHd "me" > mēd > mē

Initial *dw- (attested in Old Latin as du-) becomes b-, thus compensating for the dearth of words beginning with *b in PIE:

- PIE *deu-l̥- "injure" > duellom "war" > bellum (a variant duellum survived in poetry as a trisyllabic word, whence English "duel")
- PIE *dwis "twice" > duis > bis (cf. Greek dís, Sanskrit dvis)

Initial /w/ before a consonant was lost:

- PIE *wreyḱeh₂ (from the root *wreyḱ- “to twist”) > Latin rīca "veil"

/n/ underwent dissimilation to /r/ when followed by /m/:

- PIE *ǵénh₁mn̥ "offspring, seed" > Latin germen "seed"
- PIE *keh₂nmn̥ (from the root *keh₂n- “to sing”) > Latin carmen "song"

== See also ==
- De vulgari eloquentia
- Glossary of sound laws in the Indo-European languages
- Legacy of the Roman Empire

== Sources ==
- Allen, J. H.; Greenough, James B. (1931). New Latin Grammar. Boston: Ginn and Company.
- Herman, József (2000). Vulgar Latin. Translated by Wright, Roger. University Park: Pennsylvania State University Press. ISBN 0-271-02001-6. OL 42565M.
- Monier-Williams, Monier (1960). A Sanskrit-English Dictionary. Oxford: Oxford Clarendon.
- Sihler, Andrew L. (1995). New Comparative Grammar of Greek and Latin. Oxford University Press. ISBN 978-0-19-508345-3.

=== Neo-Latin ===
- Helander, Hans. 2001. "Neo-Latin Studies: Significance and Prospects". Symbolae Osloenses 76.1: 5–102.
- IJsewijn, Jozef with Dirk Sacré. Companion to Neo-Latin Studies. Two vols. Leuven University Press, 1990–1998.
- Knight, Sarah; Tilg, Stefan, eds. (2015). The Oxford Handbook of Neo-Latin. New York: Oxford University Press. ISBN 9780190886998. OL 28648475M.
- Moul, Victoria, ed. (2017). A Guide to Neo-Latin Literature. Cambridge, United Kingdom: Cambridge University Press. ISBN 9781108820066. OL 29875053M.
- LaCourse Munteanu, Dana; Martirosova Torlone, Zara; Dutsch, Dorota, eds. (2017). A Handbook to Classical Reception in Eastern and Central Europe. Wiley-Blackwell.

=== General ===
- Tore, Janson (2007). A Natural History of Latin. Translated by Merethe Damsgaard Sorensen; Nigel Vincent. Oxford University Press.
- Leonhardt, Jürgen (2009). Latin: Story of a World Language. Translated by Kenneth Kronenberg. Harvard. ISBN 9780674659964. OL 35499574M.
- De Vaan, Michiel (2008). Etymological Dictionary of Latin and the Other Italic Languages. Brill. ISBN 9789004167971.
- Zair, Nicholas (2023). Orthographic traditions and the sub-elite in the Roman Empire. Cambridge: Cambridge University Press. ISBN 9781009327664.
