= Arabic philosophy =

Arabic philosophy or Arab philosophy is philosophy in the Arabic language or the Arab world. It may include:

- Islamic philosophy, philosophical tradition in Muslim culture
- Judeo-Islamic philosophies, Jewish philosophical tradition in Arabic
- Sufi philosophy, philosophical tradition in Sufism
- Illuminationist philosophy, philosophical tradition developed by Shihab al-Din Suhrawardi
- Ba'athist philosophy, political philosophical tradition developed in 20th-century Syria

== See also ==
- Arabic literature
- Latin philosophy
