= Arvale =

Arvale may refer to:

- Carmen Arvale, a chant of the Arval priests of ancient Rome
- Rose Arvale, a character in American TV series The Messengers
