= Carmen Saliare =

Fragment of archaic Latin

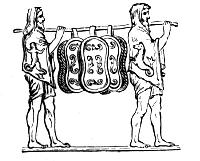
Roman bas relief. The Salian priests carry their sacred shields.

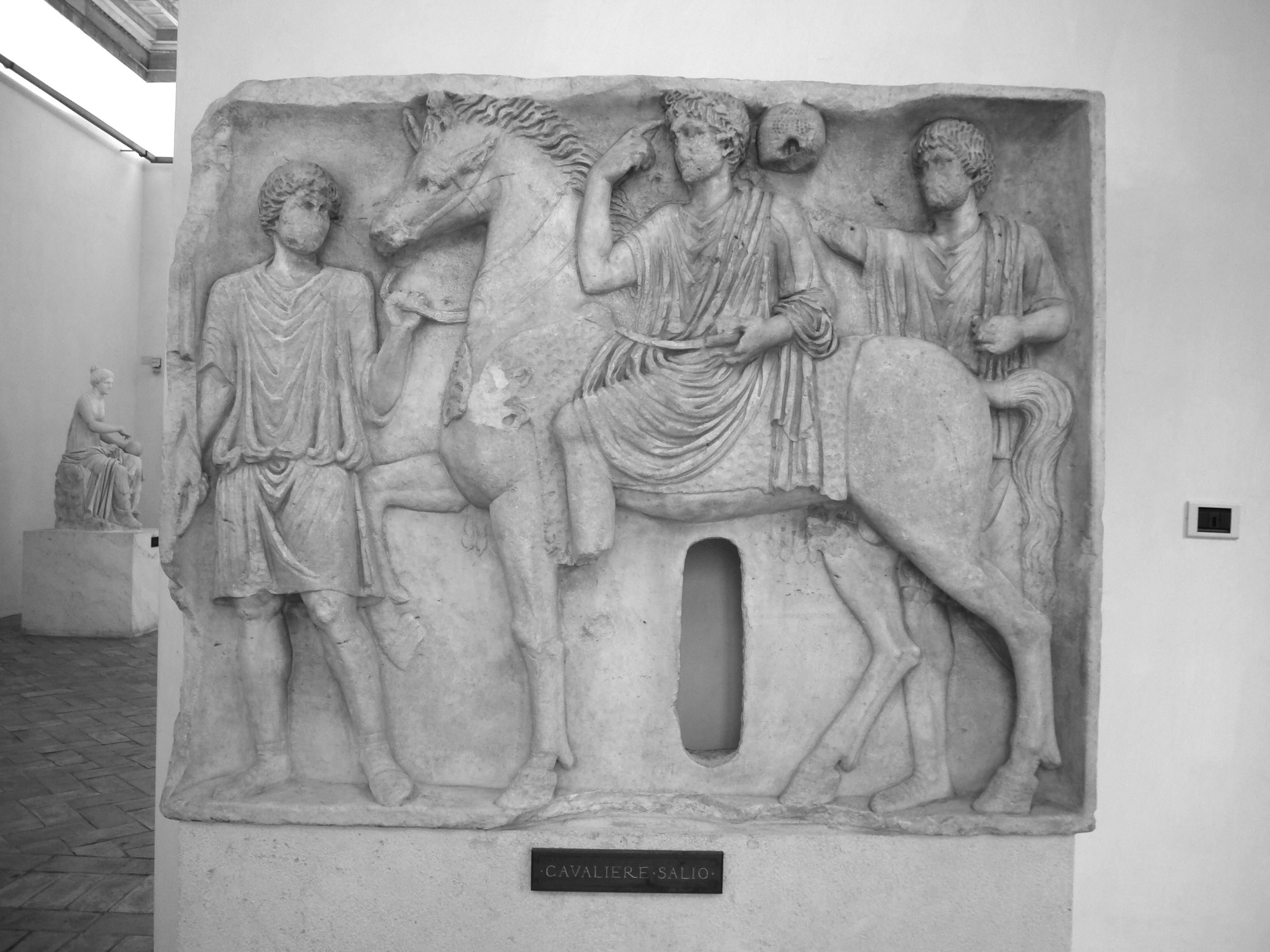
Relief depicting the Salii (National Museum of Rome - Palazzo Altemps, Rome)

The Carmen Saliare is a fragment of archaic Latin, which played a part in the rituals performed by the Salii (Salian priests, a.k.a. "leaping priests") of Ancient Rome. There are 35 extant fragments of the Carmen Saliare, which can be read in Morel's FPL.

The rituals revolved around Mars and Quirinus, and were performed in March and October. These involved processions in which they donned archaic armour and weapons, performed their sacred dance, and sang the Carmen Saliare. As a body they existed before the founding of the Roman Republic, tracing their origin back to the reign of Numa Pompilius. The Salian priests were chosen from the sons of patrician families whose parents were still living. They were appointed for life, though they were allowed to resign from the Salian priesthood if they achieved a more prestigious priesthood or a major magistracy.

In the Annales written by Roman historian Tacitus, it is revealed that several Romans proposed the name of Germanicus to be added to the Salian Song, as a memory of his virtue and goodwill.

== Fragments ==
The three longest quotations of the text appear in the works of Marcus Terentius Varro, a 1st-century BCE Roman author, and the writings of Quintus Terentius Scaurus, a 2nd-century CE Roman grammarian. There are other, smaller samples of the song that appear in the works of the 2nd-century CE grammarian Festus and the 5th-century CE historian Macrobius. In any case, these texts were extremely archaic and mysterious to even the ancient Roman authors, who may have misunderstood and erroneously recorded passages of the song. Further modifications may have then occurred over the centuries, first by medieval copyists—who would also not have understood of the true meaning of the words—and then by scholars in the 19th and 20th centuries, who sought the render the language more Latinate in appearance. Ultimately, the original text may have become so diluted that it is irrecoverable.

Two fragments which have been preserved by Varro in his De Lingua Latina, 7.26, 27 (fragment 2 and 1 by Maurenbrecher's numbering):

Latin (ed. C. O. Muellerus)	Cozeulodoizeso; omnia vero adpatula coemisse iamcusianes duo misceruses dun ianusve vet pos melios eumrecum...; Divum empta cante, divum deo supplicante.
Latin (ed. A. Spengel)	Cozeulodorieso omnia vero adpatula coemisse ian cusianes duonus ceruses dunus ianus ue uet pom elios eum recum...; divum empta cante, divum deo supplicante.
Latin (ed. R. G. Kent)	Cozevi oborieso. Omnia vero ad Patulc<ium> commisse<i>. Ianeus iam es, duonus Cerus es, du<o>nus Ianus. Ven<i>es po<tissimu>m melios eum recum...; Divum em pa cante, divum deo supplicate.
English translation (ed. R. G. Kent)	O Planter God, (Note: epithet of Janus) arise. Everything indeed have I committed unto (thee as) the Opener. Now art thou the Doorkeeper, thou art the Good Creator, the Good God of Beginnings. Thou'lt come especially, thou the superior of these kings ...; Sing ye to the Father of the Gods, entreat the God of Gods.

The mysterious cozeulodorieso has attracted several proposals. Julius Pomponius Laetus proposed in his editio princeps the interpretation osculo dolori ero "I shall be as a kiss to grief", though his emendations are now dismissed as "editorial fantasy". George Hempl restored it more carefully to coceulod orieso, attested in some manuscripts aside from the spacing, which is good archaic Latin for classical cucūlō oriēre "(thou shalt) come forth with the cuckoo". According to the classicists Giulia Sarullo and Daniel J. Taylor analyzed digital scans of an 11th-century Beneventan manuscript containing the text of De Lingua Latina, concluded that there was a subtle space between the sequences Cozeulodori and eso, which—though small—is nevertheless consistent with the tiny spaces between other words. Moreover, Sarullo and Taylor argue that, in this manuscript, the ligature ri—when it appears in the middle of word—is usually attached to the following letter, but—when it appears at the end of a word—it is followed by a space.

In the Beneventan text, the sequence lancusianes appears with an initial l, whereas other manuscripts variously provide either l or i. For instance, another Renaissance rendition of De Lingua Latina, authored in the 1390s by Coluccio Salutati, definitively provides ani at the beginning of this word. The source of the confusion in the Beneventan manuscript probably stems from the typographic similarity between the letters, as l is only distinguished from i—in this particular text—by the presence of a small upstroke at the foot of the l. Laetus renders the text as Iā cusianes, with the Iā perhaps serving as an abbreviation for a vowel combined with a nasal, in which case the term could be interpreted as either ian or iam. The former possibility—reading the word as ian—allows for a connection with the god Janus, while reading the text as iam allows for the identification of the term as the standard Latin word iam ("already, now"). Sarullo and Taylor favor the version of the text containing lancusianes, as it is the lectio difficilior and the alternatively theories do not allow for an easier interpretation of the following Iā cusianes.

A fragment preserved by Quintus Terentius Scaurus in his De orthographia (fragment 6 by Maurenbrecher's numbering):

Latin (ed. H. Keilius)	† cuine ponas Leucesiae praetexere monti quot ibet etinei de is cum tonarem.
Theodor Bergk's conjectured reconstruction	Cúme tonás, Leucésie, práe tét tremónti, Quóm tibeí cúnei décstumúm tonáront

An excerpt of it:

Latin with metre indicated	cumé tonás, Leucésie, praé tét tremónti
Rendering in classical Latin	cum tonas, Luceti, prae te tremunt
English translation	When thou thunderest, O god of Light (Jupiter), men tremble before thee

== See also ==
- Carmen (verse)
- Carmen Arvale
