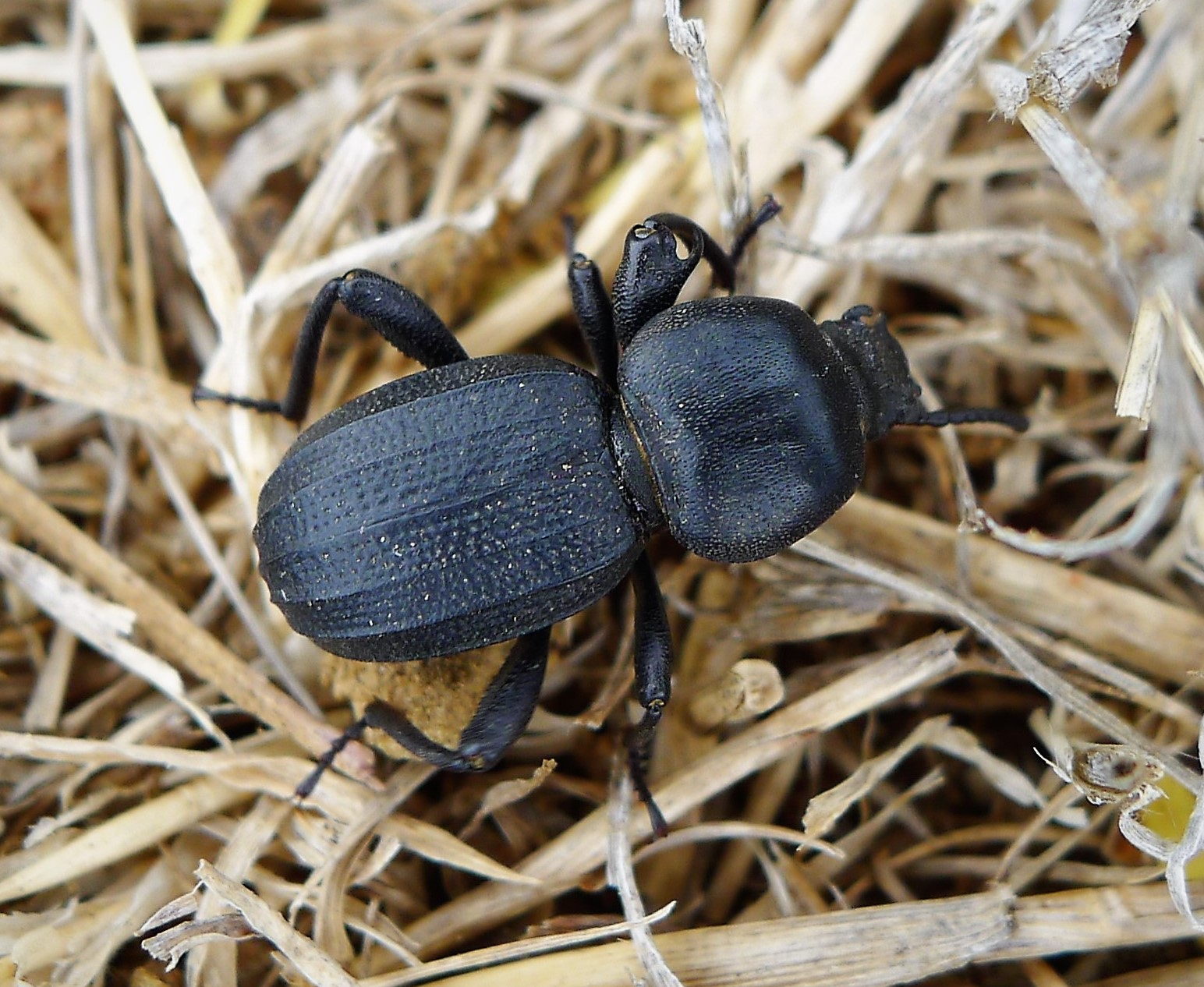
- Scaurus uncinus, Spain

Scientific classification
- Kingdom: Animalia
- Phylum: Arthropoda
- Class: Insecta
- Order: Coleoptera
- Suborder: Polyphaga
- Infraorder: Cucujiformia
- Family: Tenebrionidae
- Subfamily: Tenebrioninae
- Tribe: Scaurini; Billberg, 1820

= Scaurini =

Tribe of darkling beetles

Scaurini is a tribe of darkling beetles in the family Tenebrionidae. There are at least 4 genera in Scaurini.

== Genera ==
These genera belong to the tribe Scaurini:

- Carchares Pascoe, 1887 (tropical Africa)
- Cephalostenus Solier, 1838 (the Palearctic)
- Herpiscius Solier, 1838 (tropical Africa)
- Scaurus Fabricius, 1775 (the Palearctic and tropical Africa)
