= Heinrich Dressel =

German archaeologist (1845–1920)

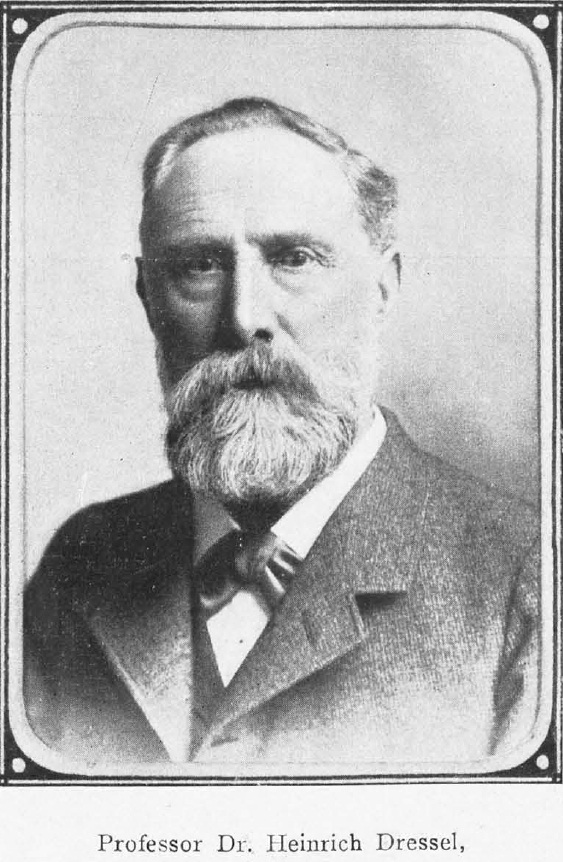
- Dressel (1907)
- Born: June 16, 1845; Rome, Papal States
- Died: July 17, 1920 (aged 75); Teisendorf, Bavaria, Germany

Heinrich Dressel (June 16, 1845 – July 17, 1920) was a German archaeologist.

He studied under Theodor Mommsen in Berlin, and later received his doctorate from the University of Göttingen with the thesis "De Isidori Originum fontibus" (1874). In 1878 he became a professor at the German Archaeological Institute in Rome, and in 1898 was appointed director of the Münzkabinett (numismatic cabinet) in Berlin.

He is best known for several books on Latin inscriptions, and he is the discoverer of the Duenos inscription in 1880 on the Quirinal Hill in Rome, one of the earliest known Old Latin texts, variously dated from the 7th to the 5th century BC. Dressel also developed a typology for classifying ancient amphorae, based on his pioneering excavations at Monte Testaccio in Rome.

Dressel is also known for his work in numismatics, and was awarded the medal of the Royal Numismatic Society in 1908.

== Bibliography ==
- Dressel, Heinrich (1899). Corpus Inscriptionum Latinarum, volume XV.
- Dressel, Heinrich. Inscriptiones urbis Romae latinae. Instrumentum domesticum.
- Dressel, Heinrich (1906). Fünf Goldmedaillons aus dem Funde von Abukir; Berlin : Verlag der Königl. Akademie der Wissenschaften.
