= Carmen (verse) =

In Ancient Rome, carmen was generally used to signify a verse, but in its proper sense, it referred to a spell or prayer, form of expiation, execration, etc. Surviving examples include the Carmen Arvale and the Carmen Saliare.

== Etymology ==
The term carmen is derived from the root canere (meaning "to sing") with the passive nominal ending -men (therefore "a thing sung," cf. flumen from fluere or numen from nuere).

== Purposes ==
Spells and incantations were used for a variety of purposes. If a spell was intended to harm someone, the State could interfere to protect him. For instance, it was not unusual for a farmer whose crops had failed to accuse another farmer of having, by a carmen, lured the crops away. Tibullus, in a poem in which he complains that an old woman has bewitched Marathus, takes the opportunity to recount various feats of witches, such as transferring crops from one field to another. Similarly, Pliny the Elder records in Naturalis historia (XVIII. 8) that a certain freedman, Furius, by using better implements and better methods than his neighbour, obtained richer crops from a smaller strip of land. A neighbour compelled Furius to go before the tribes and accused him of having bewitched his field. But when the tribes saw his sturdy slaves and his implements of witchcraft—hoes, rakes, and ploughs—they acquitted him.

== Chanting ==
That incantations were chanted is a matter of common observance and scarcely needs illustration. For example, in magic rites, the purpose of which was to induce a dislocated or broken bone to come together, the incantation was sung (cantare). Tibullus writes that a witch composed a charm for him, to be chanted three times, after which he had to spit; then Delia's husband would believe gossip about other lovers of Delia, but not about her and Tibullus.

The two oldest prayers of the Romans which are still known—the Carmen Arvale and the Carmen Saliare—were both chanted. Livy writes that "the leaping priests went through the city chanting their hymns." There is reason to believe that the old prayers which Cato has preserved in his treatise on agriculture were originally in metrical form; but in the directions given to the worshiper, the verb dicito, and not cantato, precedes the prayer, showing that, in Cato's time at least, such prayers were spoken rather than sung. However, these prayers, even in the form in which they are found in Cato, are predominantly spondaic, in keeping with the slow movement of the chant and with the solemn religious character of the rites. In ceremonies intended to bring thunderbolts down from the sky, incantations were used.

== Repetition ==
Repetition characterized the magic incantation. For instance, the incantation of the lover in Virgil's eighth Eclogue, already referred to, was repeated nine times; the incantation which the witch formulated for Tibullus had to be uttered three times. At the conclusion of the prayer to Pales is the following: "With these words the goddess must be appeased. So do you, facing the east, utter them four times…." The verses of the Carmen Saliare were each chanted three times, as the Leaping Priests of Mars danced in threefold measure. W. Warde Fowler, who on the whole is not inclined to identify spell and prayer, writes in The Religious Experience of the Roman People (1911) that the verses "seem certainly to belong rather to the region of magic than of religion proper." Repetition was also characteristic of the Carmen Arvale and the prayer of the Fratres Attiedii.
