= Latin philosophy =

Latin philosophy is philosophy in the Latin language, or from the Latin West, which may include:

- Ancient Roman philosophy, by citizens of ancient Rome, sometimes in Greek and sometimes in Latin
- Christian philosophy and Catholic theology by members of the Latin Church, historically mostly in Latin
  - Medieval philosophy in the Latin West
    - Latin translations of the 12th century, mostly from Arabic
    - Scholasticism, the dominant philosophical school in Latin universities, following these translations
  - Renaissance philosophy in the Latin West, inspired by translations from Greek, increasingly done also in vernaculars
  - Protestant theology, arising from and against Catholic theology in the Latin West
- Early modern philosophy in the Latin West, in which religious denomination and the Latin language lose centrality

It could also refer to philosophy in the Romance languages (vernaculars of Latin), or from the Romance-speaking world, such as:

- French philosophy
- Italian philosophy
- Romanian philosophy
- Spanish philosophy and Portuguese philosophy
- Latin American philosophy, done by inhabitants of Latin America, also in Spanish and Portuguese

== See also ==
- Latin literature
- History of Latin
- Greek philosophy
- Hebrew philosophy
- Islamic philosophy
- Sanskrit philosophy
