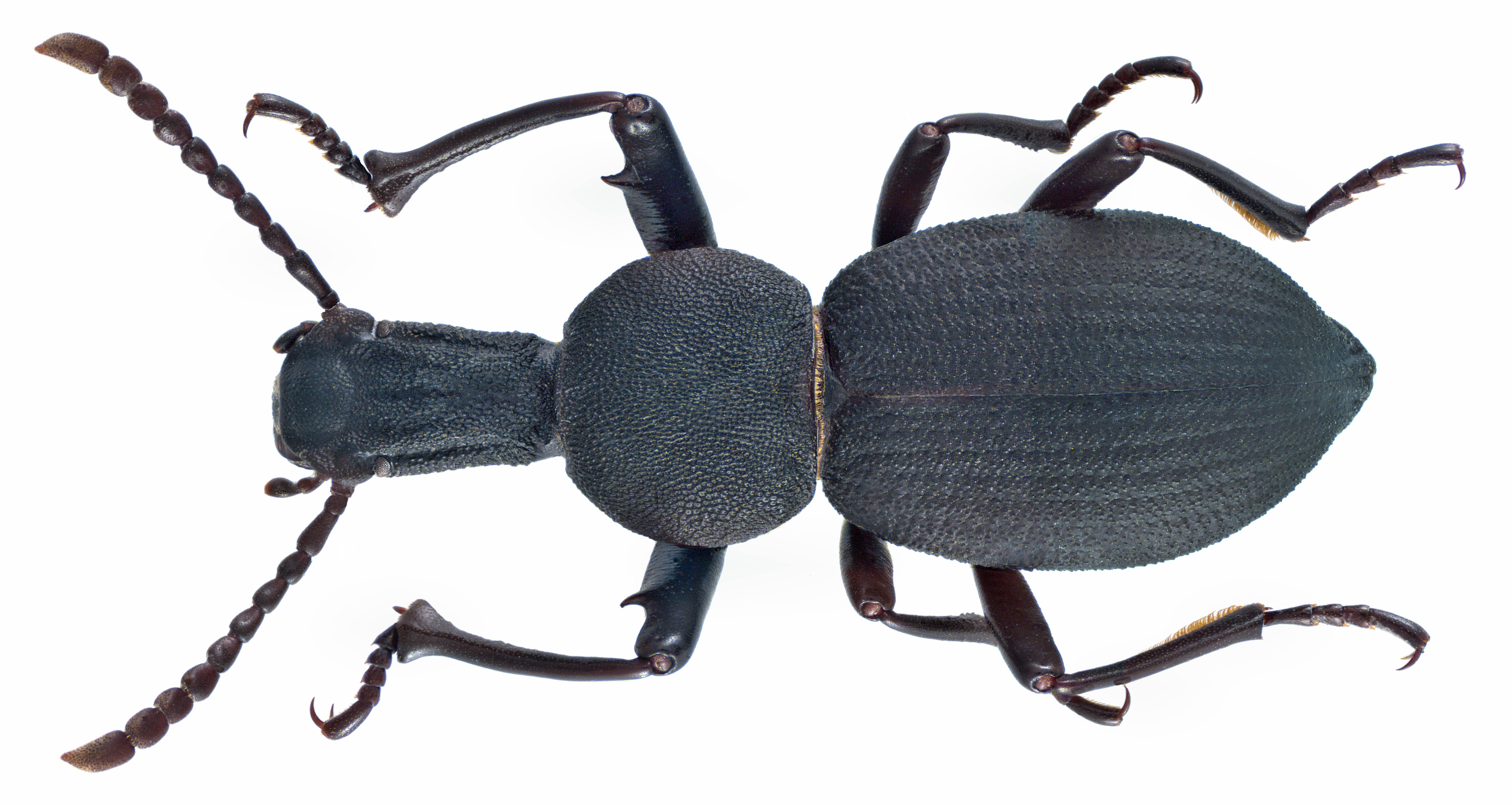
- Cephalostenus orbicollis

Scientific classification
- Domain: Eukaryota
- Kingdom: Animalia
- Phylum: Arthropoda
- Class: Insecta
- Order: Coleoptera
- Suborder: Polyphaga
- Infraorder: Cucujiformia
- Family: Tenebrionidae
- Tribe: Scaurini
- Genus: Cephalostenus; Solier 1838

Species
- Cephalostenus alziari Grimm 1991; Cephalostenus elegans (Brullé 1832); Cephalostenus orbicollis Ménétriés 1836

= Cephalostenus =

Genus of beetles

Cephalostenus is a genus of darkling beetles in the subfamily Tenebrioninae.
