= Kernos =

Pottery ring for holding offerings

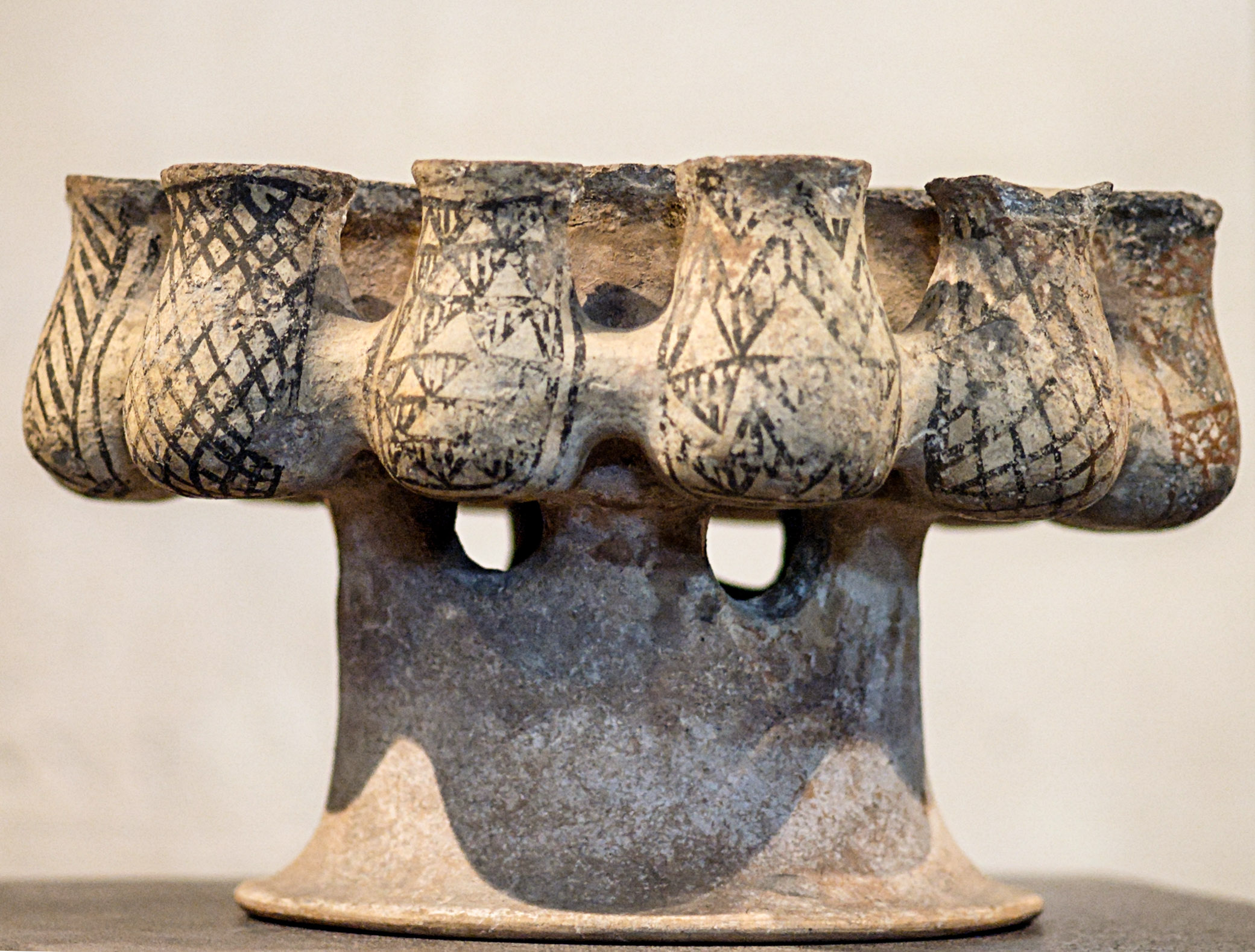
Terracotta kernos from the Cycladic period (ca. 2000 BCE), found at Melos

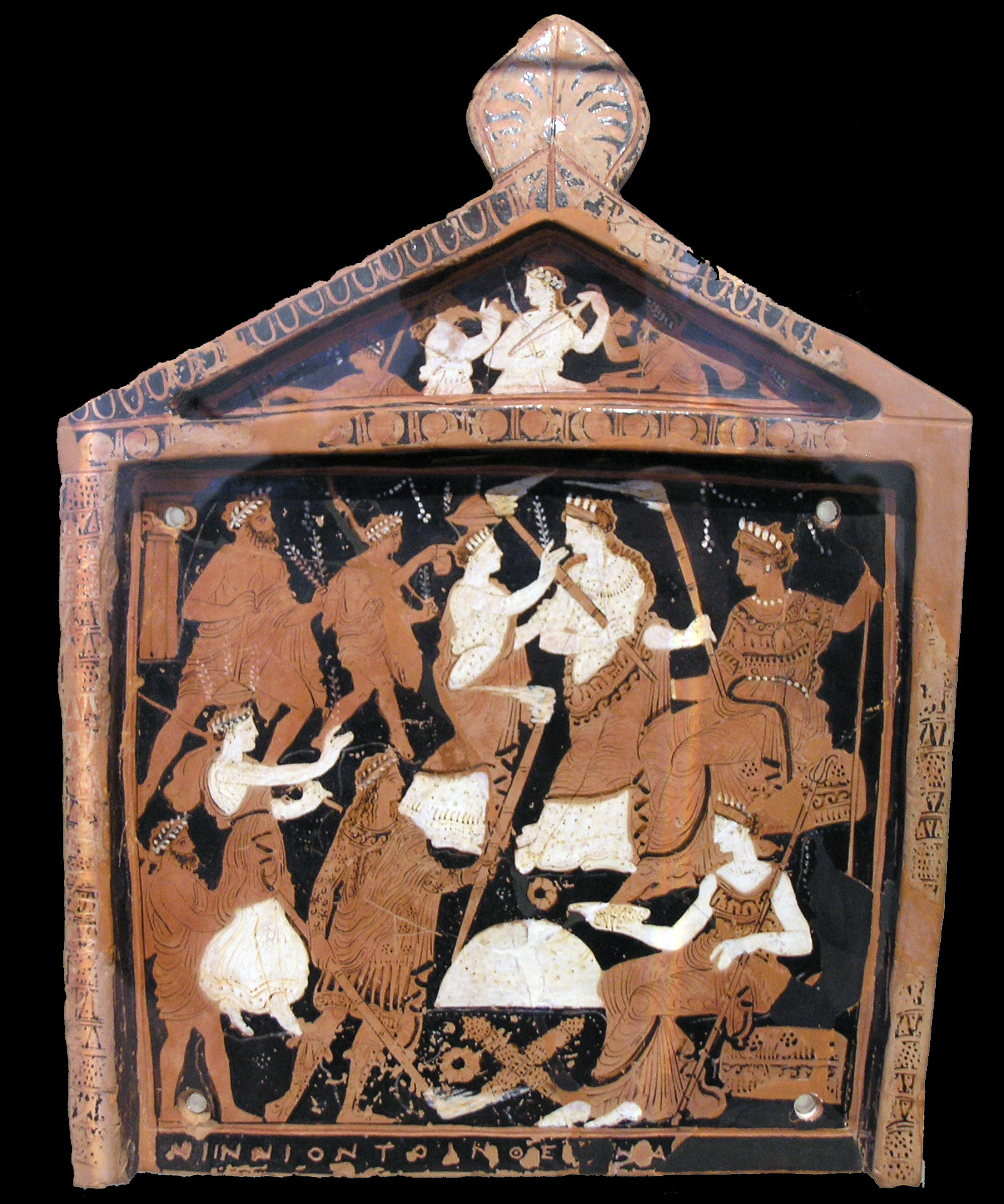
In this votive plaque depicting elements of the Eleusinian Mysteries, a female figure (top center of rectangular portion) wears a kernos on her head

In the typology of ancient Greek pottery, the kernos (Greek: κέρνος or κέρχνος, plural kernoi) is a pottery ring or stone tray to which are attached several small vessels for holding offerings. Its unusual design is described in literary sources, which also list the ritual ingredients it might contain. The kernos was used primarily in the cults of Demeter and Kore, and of Cybele and Attis.

The form begins in the Neolithic in stone, in the earliest stages of the Minoan civilization, around 3,000 BCE. They were produced in Minoan and Cycladic pottery, being the most elaborate shape in the latter, and right through ancient Greek pottery. The Duenos inscription, one of the earliest known Old Latin texts, variously dated from the 7th to the 5th century BCE, is inscribed round a kernos of three linked pots, of an Etruscan type.

The Greek term is sometimes applied to similar compound vessels from other cultures found in the Mediterranean, the Levant, Mesopotamia, and South Asia.

The Duenos inscription on its kernos vase

== Literary description ==
Athenaeus preserves an ancient description of the kernos as:

a terracotta vessel with many little bowls stuck on to it. In them there is sage, white poppy heads, wheat, barley, peas (?), vetches (?), pulse, lentils, beans, spelt (?), oats, cakes of compressed fruit, honey, olive oil, wine, milk, and unwashed sheep's wool. When one has carried this vessel, like a liknophoros, he tastes of the contents.

The kernos was carried in procession at the Eleusinian Mysteries atop the head of a priestess, as can be found depicted in art. A lamp was sometimes placed in the middle of a stationary kernos.
