= Quintus Terentius Scaurus =

Latin grammarian

Quintus Terentius Scaurus was a Latin grammarian who flourished during the reigns of Trajan and Hadrian.

He was the author of an ars grammatica and commentaries on Horace, Virgil's Aeneid and perhaps Plautus. Under his name, two fragments are extant—the longer from his work on orthography (De orthographia), the shorter (chiefly on the use of prepositions) from another grammatical work. They have both been published by Heinrich Keil in Scriptores de orthographia, the 7th volume of his Grammatici Latini (Teubner, 1880); the De orthographia has appeared in a new edition prepared by Federico Biddau (Weidmann, 2008).

== Editions ==
- Heinrich Keil (1880). Scriptores de orthographia. Grammatici Latini. Vol. 7. Teubner; re-issued by Cambridge Library Collection (2010), ISBN 978-1-108-00644-6.
- Federico Biddau (ed.), Q. Terentii Scauri De orthographia (Hildesheim: Weidmann, 2008), Pp. cxiv, 244 (Bibliotheca Weidmanniana, 6, Pars. 5). Review by Leofranc Holford-Strevens, BMCR.
