= Carmen Arvale =

Preserved chant of the Arval priests of ancient Rome

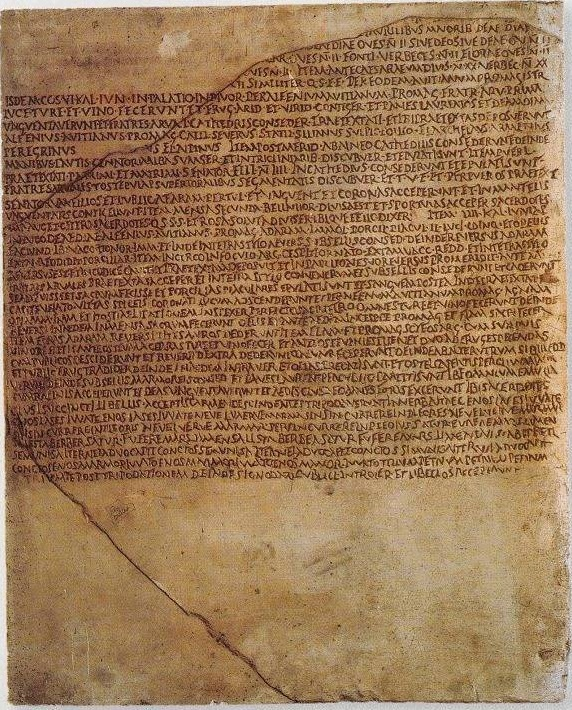
Inscription of the Carmen Arvale

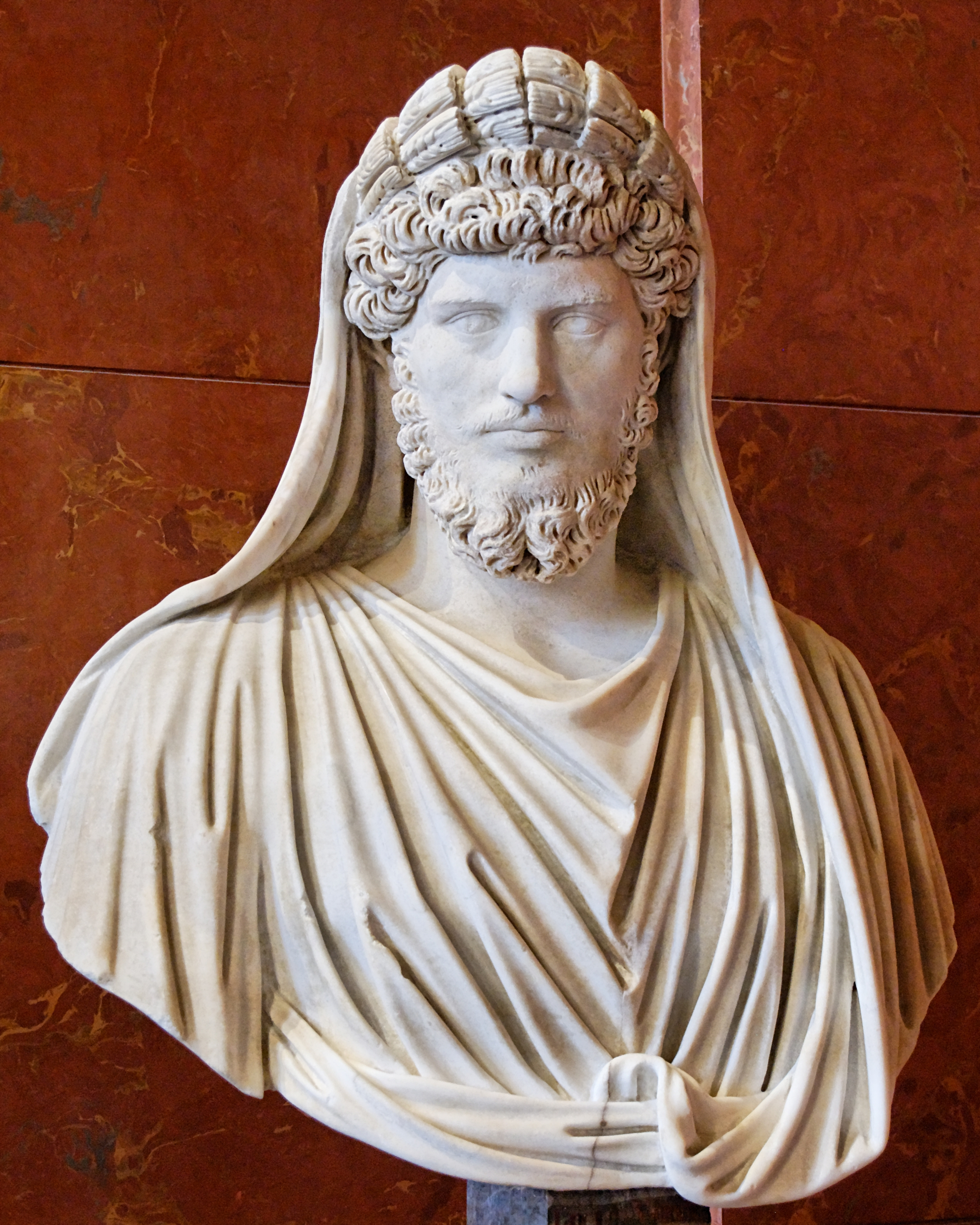
Sculpture of the emperor Lucius Verus in the costume of an Arval Brother (ca. 160 AD)

The Carmen Arvale is the preserved chant of the Arval priests or Fratres Arvales of ancient Rome. The Carmen Arvale is preserved on an inscription discovered in 1778 during the construction of a sacrarium for Pope Pius VI, which—according to the classicist Arthur E. Gordon—is perhaps to be identified with the Sagrestia of St. Peter's Basilica. On the back of the inscription, there is mention of the emperor and the consul Marcus Oclatinius Adventus, thereby implying a date of 218 CE. The song is only a component of the broader inscription, which also describes the proceedings of a celebration of the goddess Dea Dia.

Although the inscription was probably created in 218, it is possible that the song itself may date back to the 4th-century BCE, as it is written in an archaic form of Old Latin. The text includes numerous archaic Latin forms, such as "lases" instead of "lares," though still contains later forms such as "iuvate." Furthermore, the text contains multiple separate forms of the same word, such as the varying forms pleores and pleoris. It is perhaps possible that the song was orally transmitted for centuries before eventually being codified at a later date, perhaps with a series of successive alterations to the text, thereby explaining the mixture of archaic and later Latin forms. It is alternatively possible that the text may have been created by an Augustan scholar, who perhaps modeled the song after other ancient Latin writings, such as the Carmen Saliare. However, the philologist Zoa Alonso Fernández considers such a hypothesis to be "almost impossible to prove." Fernández does, however, suggest the possibility that the inscription may have served to legitimize the rule of Emperor Elagabalus (r. 218–222), who is mentioned in the accompanying text as a new member of the Arval Brotherhood and who, historically, had only recently overthrown the previous emperor Macrinus.

According to Gordon, throughout the inscription, the majority of the letters assume various different shapes, and they are often easily confused with others. Due to these discrepancies, Gordon suggests that the stonecutter must have copied from a handwritten source, thereby incurring the natural stylistic variation of handwriting. Moreover, Gordon argues that the craftsman himself probably did not fully understand the contents of the text. While passages of this text are obscure, Gordon nevertheless considers the correct reading of much of the inscription to be "clear." Likewise, the classicist Philip Baldi, despite agreeing that the general meaning of the text is clear, states that interpretations of the song can "vary wildly." The traditional interpretation makes the chant a prayer to seek aid of Mars and the Lares (lases), beseeching Mars not to let plagues or disasters overtake in the fields, asking him to be satiated, and dance, and call forth the "Semones."

The request for the protection of Mars is consistent with a general characterization of Mars as a guardian deity. Similarly, in another text—a prayer recorded by Cato the Elder—a peasant performs a lustration around their fields and calls upon Mars to protect their land from a variety of misfortunes. The term "Semunis" is probably to be connected with the name Semo, which appears as an epithet of Sancus in other Roman writings. According to the philologist Michael Weiss, the text of the song indicates that Mars was summoning forth the Semones. In particular, Weiss notes the usage of the term "advocapit," which Weiss compares to a passage from Seneca the Younger in which the verb advoco is utilized to describe Jupiter summoning a group of deities. Weiss concludes that the Semones—within this song—were connected with the god Mars and may have served as his retinue.

== Text ==
One of its interpretations goes as follows: (Note: The inscription itself contains no spaces, the following transcription may therefore not reflect the original text.)

E NOS, LASES, IVVATE,
[E] NOS, LASES, IVVATE, E NOS, LASES, IVVATE; NEVE LVAE
RVE, MARMA(R), SINS INCVRRERE IN PLEORES, NEVE LVE RVE,
MARMAR,
[S]INS INCVRRERE IN PLEORIS, NEVE LVE RVE, MARMAR, SERS
(or SERP) INCVRRERE IN PLEORIS; SATVR FV, RERE (for FERE)
MARS, LIMEN
[SA]LE STA BERBER, SATVR FV, FERE MARS, LIMEN SALL (for
SALI) STA BERBER, SATVR FV, FERE MARS, LIMEN SNI (for
SALI) STA BERBER;
[SEMIVNIS ALTERNEI ADVOCAPIT CONCTOS, SEMVNIS
ALTERNEI ADVOCAPIT CONCTOS, SIMVNIS ALTERNEI.
ADVOCAPIT
[CONCT]OS; E NOS, MARMOR, IVVATO, E NOS, MARMQR,
IVVATO, E NOS, MA[R]MOR, IVVATO; TRIVMPE, TRIVMPE,
TRIVMPE TRIVM[PE TRI]VMPE

=== Translation ===
Translation by Eric Herbet Warmington:

Oh ! Help us, ye Household Gods! Oh! help us;
ye Household Gods! Oh help us, ye Household Gods.
And let not bane and bale, O Marmar, assail
more folk. And let not bane and bale, O Marmar,
assail more folk. And let not bane and bale, O
Marmar, assail more folk.
Be full satisfied, fierce Mars. Leap the threshold!
Halt! Beat the ground! Be full satisfied, fierce
Mars. Leap the threshold! Halt! Beat the
ground! Be full satisfied, fierce Mars. Leap the
threshold! Halt! Beat the ground!
By turns address ye all the Half-Gods. By turns
address ye all the Half-Gods. By turns address ye
all the Half-Gods.
Oh! Help us, Marmor! Oh! Help us, Marmor!
Oh! Help us, Marmor! Bound, bound, and bound
again, bound and bound again!

=== Lexical analysis ===
- The term "enos" may consist of the Latin pronoun nos ("we") and the same prefix e- found in terms such as edepol ("by Pollux"). In the edition of the text for the Corpus Inscriptionum Latinarum by Ernst Lommatzsch, the word is rendered as a single unified term "enos." However, other authors—such as Gordon—separate the sequence into two separate words: "e" and "nos."
- The word "lases" is an unrhotacized form of the word Lares. There are other examples of a similar preservation of intervocalic -s- in Old Latin, such as the archaic form asa for later ara ("altar").
- The forms "lue" and "rue" are generally separated by most editors and often emended to "luem" and "ruem" respectively. These terms may be interpreted as the accusative singular forms of the Latin words lues ("plague, pestilence") and rues, a word that is otherwise only known from a single gloss in which it is equated with the term ruina ("ruin").
- Regarding the interpretation of the term "sins," the philologists Philip Baldi and Frederic de Forest Allen both consider it to be an inflected form of the verb sino ("to let, permit"). More particularly, Baldi suggests that it is equivalent to the Latin second-person singular present active subjunctive form sinas ("to let, permit"), whereas Allen allows for the additional possibility that the term may represent the second-person singular future active indicative form sines. Baldi further suggests that the specific form "sins" perhaps reflects a mistake with the stone carving.
- The first two instances of the sequence "SINSINCURRERE" are sometimes split into the "sins" and "incurrere," though Gordon suggests that the inscription may instead showcase a break in the script between "in" and "currere."
- The text simultaneously utilizes the form pleores and pleoris, both of which are probably archaic forms of the Latin comparative plures ("more, many").
- The forms "Marmar" and "Marmor" are probably alternative names of Mars.
- The phrase limen sali, sta means "jump over the beam of the threshold/door/lintel, stand" in standard Latin.
- In the original inscription, the first instance of the sequence "furere" is spelled with an initial "E-like F." This is form is generally split into the terms "fu" and "fere." Of these terms, the word "fu" probably derives from the Proto-Indo-European root *bʰuH-, whence also fui—the past perfect form of the verb "sum" ("to be"). It is possible that the term may be an old imperative form that was eventually lost by the time of Classical Latin.
- The exact meaning of "berber" is unclear, with Baldi stating that most analysis of this form is purely "speculative." Baldi suggests that the term may be a reduplication of an otherwise unknown stem and de Forest Allen suggests that it may equate to the term verber ("whip, lash"). Another possibility, also advanced by Baldi, is that the word boundaries perhaps ought to be emended, allowing for a reading of the form as "taberer." If this theory is accepted, it may allow for a connection with the word tabes ("melting, decay"), which itself may indicate that the form "taberer" means something akin to "war."
- The term "semunis" may be a later Imperial-era corruption rather than a genuinely archaic form.
- The term "alternei" ("by turns") may represent an old locative form. Within the sequence "SIMVNISALTERNIE," the word may be alternatively spelled as "alternie."
- According to Baldi, the form "advocapit" may constitute a reduction of an older second-person plural imperative form *advocapite. De Forest Allen additionally suggests that it may represent a hypothetical imperative form *advocabite, a type of future imperatives that—should it have existed—could perhaps parallel the future forms marked by the morpheme -b-. Alternatively, Allen suggests that it may equate to Latin advocabitis, labelling the form a "future in imperative sense." However, Weiss argues that the interpretation of the term as a future form is incongruent with the imperative verbs in the other lines. Likewise, Warmington argues that the term is best interpreted as an imperative considering the other lines of the song largely include imperative verbs. According to Allen, the spelling with the letter ⟨p⟩ is "unexampled" and likely an error for intended ⟨b⟩. However, according to the philologist Michael Weiss, since the inscription also contains words such as "berber," it was certainly written in an alphabet that utilized the letter ⟨b⟩. For this reason, Weiss opts to explain the term as a combination of advocare and a variant of -pte, an emphatic particle.
- The form "conctos" is probably a contraction of *co-iunctos.

== See also ==
- Carmen (verse)
- Carmen Saliare
