= Heinrich Keil =

German classical philologist

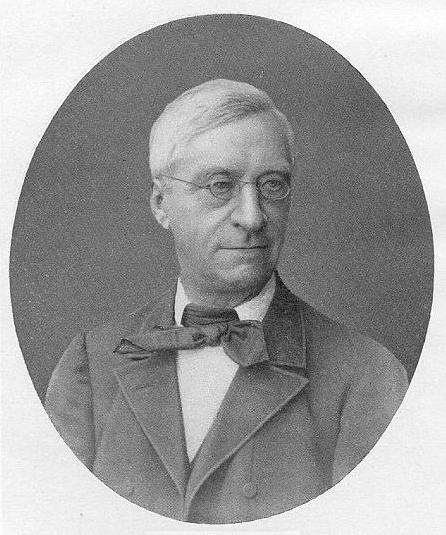
Heinrich Keil (1822–1894)

Theodor Heinrich Gottfried Keil (25 May 1822, Gressow – 27 August 1894, Friedrichroda) was a German classical philologist. He was a son-in-law to educator Friedrich August Eckstein (1810–1885).

He studied classical philology at the Universities of Göttingen and Bonn, receiving his doctorate in 1843 with a textual critique on the Roman poet Propertius. From 1844 to 1846 he conducted manuscript studies at libraries in Italy. After his return to Germany, he became an instructor at the Francke Foundation Pädagogium in Halle an der Saale.

In 1859 he was named successor to Carl Friedrich Nagelsbach as chair of classical philology at the University of Erlangen. In 1869 he became a full professor of classical philology at the University of Halle as a successor to Theodor Bergk.

== Published works ==
The focus of his work were studies of the ancient Latin grammarians (Grammatici latini, eight volumes, 1855–1880) and critical editions involving the works of Cato the Elder, Varro and Pliny the Younger. In 1875, he began the series Dissertationes philologicae Halenses (13 volumes up to the year 1894).

- Obseruationes criticae in Propertium, 1843.
- Observationum criticarum in Catonis et Varronis de re rustica libros caput secundum, 1848.
- Analecta grammatica, 1848.
- Observationes criticae in Catonis et Varronis De re rvstica libros accedit Epimetrvm criticvm, 1849.
- Grammatici latini, 1855–80: vol. 1, vol. 2, vol. 3, vol. 4, vol. 5, vol. 6 part 1, vol. 6 part 2, vol. 7,
- Quaestiones grammaticae, 1860.
- Henrici Keilii De libris manu scriptis Catonis de agri cultura disputatio.
- Henrici Keilii De Plinii epistulis emendandis disputatio, 1865-1866.
