= Cephalostenus elegans =

Scientific classification
- Domain: Eukaryota
- Kingdom: Animalia
- Phylum: Arthropoda
- Class: Insecta
- Order: Coleoptera
- Suborder: Polyphaga
- Infraorder: Cucujiformia
- Family: Tenebrionidae
- Genus: Cephalostenus
- Species: C. elegans

Binomial name
- Cephalostenus elegans (Brullé 1832)

Synonyms
- Scaurus elegans Brullé 1832

Species of beetle

Cephalostenus elegans is a species of darkling beetles in the subfamily Tenebrioninae. It is found in Greece.
