= Satria gens =

Ancient Roman family

The gens Satria was a minor plebeian family at ancient Rome. Members of this gens are mentioned in the first century BC, and under the early Empire, but none of them rose higher than the rank of praetor. Otherwise the Satrii are known largely from inscriptions.

== Origin ==
The nomen Satrius belongs to a large class of gentilicia apparently of Oscan origin, which may account for why the name does not appear at Rome until the end of the Republic. The nomen Satrienus seems to have been derived from Satrius using the gentile-forming suffix -enus, which was generally applied to existing nomina.

== Members ==
This list includes abbreviated praenomina. For an explanation of this practice, see filiation.

- Aulus Caninius Satrius, a friend of Cicero, who declined to undertake a lawsuit against him on behalf of Satrius' cousin, Caecilius, the uncle of Titus Pomponius Atticus, for colluding in a fraudulent land sale, in 65 BC. Cicero apologizes to Atticus for the rift this caused between him and Caecilius. Some texts amend Satrius to Satyrus.
- Marcus Satrius, the nephew of Lucius Minucius Basilus, by whom he was adopted, and whose name he assumed. Although he had served under Caesar in Gaul and during the Civil War, he joined the conspiracy against him, ostensibly because he had not been rewarded with a province of his own in 44 BC. He was one of Caesar's assassins, but in the following year was killed by his own slaves, whom he had punished with mutilation.
- Satrius, the legate of Gaius Trebonius in 43 BC.
- Marcus Satrius Valens, praetor urbanus in AD 19.
- Satrius Secundus, the husband of Albucilla, was persuaded by Sejanus to accuse the historian Aulus Cremutius Cordus of majestas, for praising Brutus and Cassius, the tyrannicides, in AD 25. Twelve years later, Satrius helped bring about Sejanus' downfall, evidently by providing Antonia with information about the plot against the emperor Tiberius.
- Titus Satrius Decianus, appointed one of the curatores tabulariorum publicorum, or curators of the public records, in AD 43.
- Satria (or Atria) Galla, wife of Gaius Calpurnius Piso who was spared by Nero after her husbands conspiracy.
- Lucius Satrius Silvinus, a procurator, who dedicated a first-century tomb at Tergeste in Venetia and Histria to his wife, Caesidia Amabilis.
- Satrius Rufus, an orator in the time of Pliny the Younger.
- Lucius Satrius Abascantus, a freedman on whose behalf the younger Pliny petitioned the emperor Trajan for Roman citizenship.
- Satria L. f., the wife of Juncus Major, who had been quaestor, tribune of the plebs, and praetor.

== See also ==
- List of Roman gentes

== Bibliography ==
- Marcus Tullius Cicero, Epistulae ad Atticum, Epistulae ad Familiares.
- Gaius Julius Caesar, Commentarii de Bello Gallico (Commentaries on the Gallic War).
- Pseudo-Brutus, Epistulae ad Ciceronem (Letters to Cicero, attributed to Brutus, but of uncertain authorship).
- Marcus Annaeus Lucanus (Lucan), Pharsalia.
- Lucius Annaeus Seneca (Seneca the Younger), De Consolatione ad Marciam (To Marcia, on Consolation).
- Flavius Josephus, Antiquitates Judaïcae (Antiquities of the Jews).
- Gaius Plinius Caecilius Secundus (Pliny the Younger), Epistulae (Letters).
- Publius Cornelius Tacitus, Annales.
- Lucius Annaeus Florus, Epitome de T. Livio Bellorum Omnium Annorum DCC (Epitome of Livy: All the Wars of Seven Hundred Years).
- Appianus Alexandrinus (Appian), Bellum Civile (The Civil War).
- Lucius Cassius Dio Cocceianus (Cassius Dio), Roman History.
- Dictionary of Greek and Roman Biography and Mythology, William Smith, ed., Little, Brown and Company, Boston (1849).
- Theodor Mommsen et alii, Corpus Inscriptionum Latinarum (The Body of Latin Inscriptions, abbreviated CIL), Berlin-Brandenburgische Akademie der Wissenschaften (1853–present).
- René Cagnat et alii, L'Année épigraphique (The Year in Epigraphy, abbreviated AE), Presses Universitaires de France (1888–present).
- George Davis Chase, "The Origin of Roman Praenomina", in Harvard Studies in Classical Philology, vol. VIII, pp. 103–184 (1897).
- Paul von Rohden, Elimar Klebs, & Hermann Dessau, Prosopographia Imperii Romani (The Prosopography of the Roman Empire, abbreviated PIR), Berlin (1898).
- T. Robert S. Broughton, The Magistrates of the Roman Republic, American Philological Association (1952–1986).
