= Old Latin =

Latin language in the period before 70 BC

- Priscan Latin
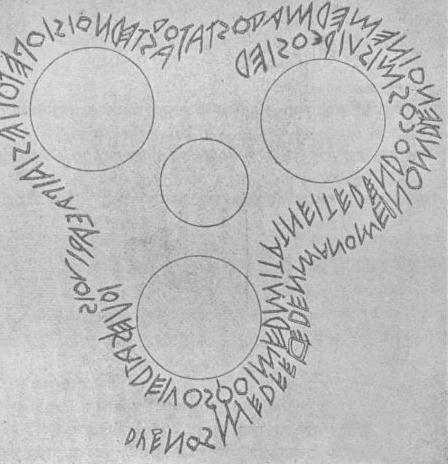
- The Duenos inscription, one of the earliest Old Latin texts
- Native to: Latium, later the Roman Kingdom and Republic
- Region: Italy
- Ethnicity: Latins, Romans
- Era: Attested since 7th century BC. Developed into Classical Latin around 75 BC.
- Language family: Indo-European: Italic; Latino-Faliscan; Old Latin
- Early forms: Proto-Indo-European: Proto-Italic; Proto-Latino-Faliscan
- Writing system: Old Italic script before it evolved into the Latin alphabet

Official status
- Official language in: Rome
- Regulated by: Schools of grammar and rhetoric

Language codes
- ISO 639-3: None (mis)
- Glottolog: oldl1238
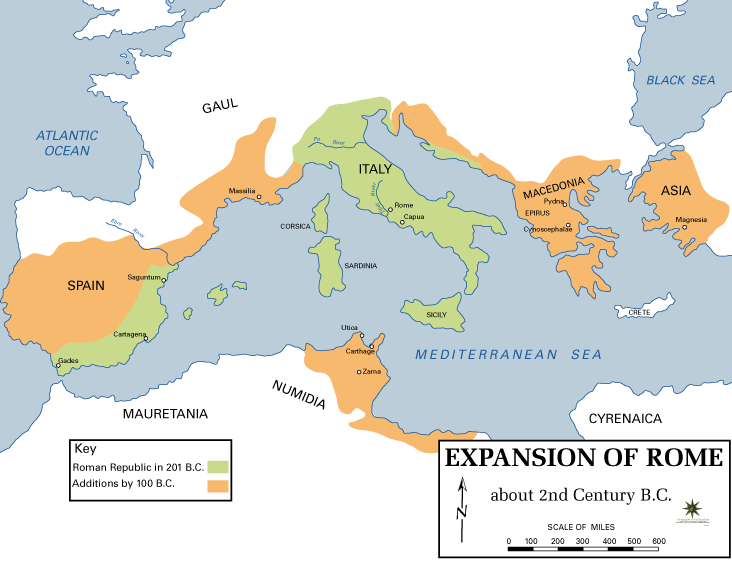
- Expansion of the Roman Republic during the 2nd century BC. Very little Latin is likely to have been spoken beyond the green area, and other languages were spoken even within it.

Old Latin, also known as Early, Archaic or Priscan Latin (Classical Latin: prīsca Latīnitās, lit. 'ancient Latinity'), was the Latin language in the period roughly before 75 BC, i.e. before the age of Classical Latin. A member of the Italic languages, it descends from a common Proto-Italic language; Latino-Faliscan is a separate branch from Osco-Umbrian. All these languages may be relatively closely related to Venetic and possibly further to Celtic (see the Italo-Celtic hypothesis).

The use of "old", "early" and "archaic" has been standard in publications of Old Latin writings since at least the 18th century. The definition is not arbitrary, but the terms refer to spelling conventions and word forms not generally found in works written under the Roman Empire. This article presents some of the major differences.

The earliest known specimen of Latin seems to be on the Praeneste fibula. An analysis done in 2011 declared it to be genuine "beyond any reasonable doubt" and dating from the Orientalizing period, in the first half of the seventh century BC. Other Old Latin inscriptions dated to either the late Roman Kingdom or early Roman Republic include the Lapis Niger stone, the Duenos inscription on a kernos vase, and the Garigliano bowl of Bucchero type.

== Philological constructs ==
=== Old-time language ===
The concept of Old Latin (Prisca Latinitas) is as old as the concept of Classical Latin – both labels date to at least as early as the late Roman Republic. In that period Cicero, along with others, noted that the language he used every day, presumably upper-class city Latin, included lexical items and phrases that were heirlooms from a previous time, which he called verborum vetustas prisca ("the old age/time of language"). In the classical period, Prisca Latinitas, Prisca Latina and other idioms using the adjective always meant these remnants of a previous language, which, in Roman philology, was taken to be much older than in fact it really was. Viri prisci, "former men", meant the population of Latium before the founding of Rome.

=== Four Latins of Isidore ===
In the Late Latin period, when Classical Latin was behind them, Latin- and Greek-speaking grammarians were faced with multiple phases, or styles, within the language. Isidore of Seville (c. 560–636) reports a classification scheme that had come into existence in or before his time: "the four Latins", (saying in his Etymologiae, "moreover, some people have said that there are four Latin languages"; "latinas autem linguas quattuor esse quidam dixerunt"). These were:

- Prisca, spoken before the founding of Rome, when Janus and Saturn ruled Latium, to which period Isidore dated the Carmen Saliare
- Latina, dated from the time of king Latinus, in which period he placed the laws of the Twelve Tables
- Romana, essentially the same as Classical Latin
- Mixta, "mixed" Classical Latin and Vulgar Latin, known today as Late Latin.

This scheme persisted with little change for some thousand years after Isidore.

=== Old Latin and Very Old Latin ===
In 1874, John Wordsworth used this definition: "By Early Latin I understand Latin of the whole period of the Republic, which is separated very strikingly, both in tone and in outward form, from that of the Empire." However, the term "Old Latin," encompassing the whole of six centuries of pre-Classical Latin, includes vastly distinct stages of the language. Native speakers of Latin evidently felt as if the earliest phases of the Latin language were distinct from the later varieties of pre-classical Latin. Latin speakers of the empire had no reported trouble understanding much of Old Latin, except for the few texts that must date from the time of the kings, mainly songs. However, Polybius, a 2nd-century BCE Greek historian, writes that the text of the earliest treaty between Rome and Carthage, dated to around 508-507 BCE, was nearly incomprehensible to the Romans of his day, even after the "most intelligent men" had sought to decipher it. Other ancient Roman authors commented upon the obscure nature of the Carmen Saliare, itself an archaic Latin text. For instance, Horace—a lyric poet of the 1st-century BCE—writes that whoever "cries up Numa’s Salian hymn" would " alone seem to understand what he knows as little of as I do." Likewise, the 1st-century CE rhetorician Quintilian mentions "now forgotten ages" of Latin and states that the Carmen Saliare was, by his day, hardly understood by even the Salian priests.

Michael Weiss, an Indo-Europeanist scholar, argues for a division between Old Latin and Very Old Latin, the split between which dates to around 330 BCE. According to Weiss, this date was chosen to match with the rhotacism of s, which was a sound change that—besides significantly affecting the phonology of the language—was also recognized by the ancient Romans as a specific different between their contemporary language and that of archaic periods. Alternatively, the linguists James Clackson and Geoffrey Horrocks establish a distinction between "Archaic Latin," which ended at around 400 BCE, and "Old Latin," which denotes the rest of pre-Classical Latin. John Penney, a classicist who accepts this alternative model, argues that placing the dividing line at 400 BCE is convenient for scholarly discussion due to the severe dearth of evidence for Latin in the late 5th and early 4th centuries BCE. Even more specifically, the Latinist Béla Adamik dates the end of "Archaic Latin" at the last quarter of the 4th-century BCE, by which time the syncope of the 5th-century and the vowel weakening and rhotacism of the 4th-century had been completed, thus rendering the preceding centuries of Latin mutually unintelligible with the ensuing "Old Latin" era. Regarding the terminology, the name "Very Old Latin" has been criticized as somewhat awkward, though Weiss and de Vaan argue that the alternative name "Archaic Latin" creates unnecessary ambiguity, as the chronological distinction between the words "archaic" and "old" is not self-evident.

The philologist Michiel de Vaan adopts the same terminology as Weiss, utilizing "Very Old Latin" and "Old Latin," though he places the end of the "Very Old Latin" period at 240 BCE. This same date is also supported the Indo-Europeanist Gerhard Meiser, who distinguished between "Early Latin" (Frühlatein) and "Old Latin" (Altlatein). According to this model, the first period lasts from the 7th or 6th centuries to 240 BCE, with that specific date chosen to represent the completion of Livius Andronicus's first drama and consequently the beginning of attested Latin literature. The second phase lasts from 240 BCE to the first half of the 1st-century BCE, with Classical Latin beginning at 81 BCE, when Cicero began writing. This particular model is popular amongst German scholarship, though it has been criticized for segmenting Latin chronology on the basis of particular authors rather than linguistic differences. Moreover, adopting a date of 240 BCE necessitates that the elogium of Scipio Barbatus, which dates to 260 BCE, be assigned to the Very Old Latin period, despite being closer in language to Old Latin texts than extremely archaic Latin inscriptions such as the Forum inscription.

There is no sharp distinction between Old Latin, as it was spoken for most of the Republic, and Classical Latin, but the earlier grades into the latter. The end of the republic was too late a termination for compilers after Wordsworth; Charles Edwin Bennett said, "'Early Latin' is necessarily a somewhat vague term... Bell, De locativi in prisca Latinitate vi et usu, Breslau, 1889, sets the later limit at 75 BC. A definite date is really impossible, since archaic Latin does not terminate abruptly, but continues even down to imperial times." Bennett's own date of 100 BC did not prevail; rather Bell's 75 BC became the standard as expressed in the four-volume Loeb Library and other major compendia. Over the 377 years from 452 to 75 BC, Old Latin evolved from texts partially comprehensible by classicists with study to being easily read by scholars.

== Corpus ==
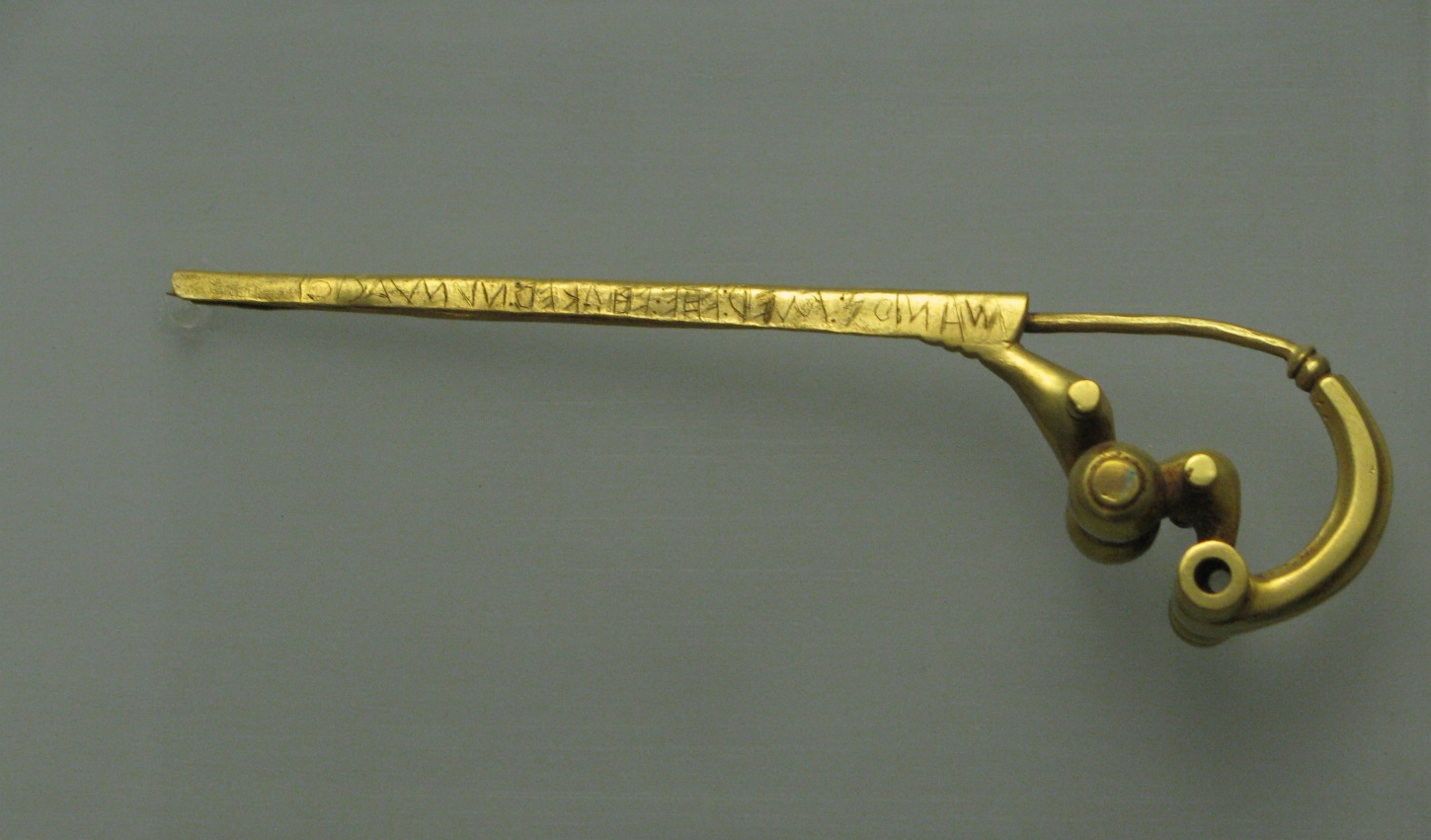
The Praeneste Fibula, the earliest known specimen of the Latin language and dated to the first half of the seventh century BC.

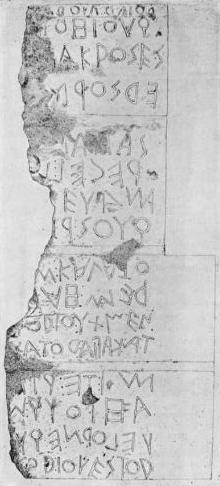
The Forum inscription (Lapis Niger, "black stone"), one of the oldest known Latin inscriptions, from the 6th century BC; it is written boustrophedon, albeit irregularly; from a rubbing by Domenico Comparetti.

The Duenos Inscription on a trio of three globular kernos vases

Old Latin authored works began in the 3rd century BC. These are complete or nearly complete works under their own name surviving as manuscripts copied from other manuscripts in whatever script was current at the time. There are also fragments of works quoted in other authors.

Many texts placed by various methods (painting, engraving, embossing) on their original media survive just as they were except for the ravages of time. Some of these were copied from other inscriptions. No inscription can be older than the introduction of the Greek alphabet into Italy but none survive from that early date. The imprecision of archaeological dating makes it impossible to assign a year to any one inscription, but the earliest survivals are probably from the 6th century BC. Some texts, however, that survive as fragments in the works of classical authors, had to have been composed earlier than the republic, in the time of the monarchy. These are listed below. Some authors, especially in recent texts, refer to the oldest Latin documents (7th–4th c. BCE) as Very Old Latin (VOL).

=== Fragments and inscriptions ===
Notable Old Latin fragments with estimated dates include:

- The Carmen Saliare (chant put forward in classical times as having been sung by the Salian brotherhood formed by Numa Pompilius, approximate date 700 BC)
- The Praeneste fibula (date from first half of the seventh century BC.)
- The Tita Vendia vase (c. 620–600 BC)
- The Forum inscription (see illustration, c. 550 BC under the monarchy)
- The Duenos inscription (c. 500 BC)
- The Castor-Pollux dedication (c. 500 BC)
- The Garigliano Bowl (c. 500 BC)
- The Corcolle Altar fragments (c. 500 BC)
- The Lapis Satricanus (early 5th century BC)
- The preserved fragments of the laws of the Twelve Tables (traditionally, 449 BC, attested much later)
- The Tibur pedestal (c. 400 BC)
- The Scipionum Elogia
  - Epitaph of Lucius Cornelius Scipio Barbatus (consul 298 BC)
  - Epitaph of Lucius Cornelius Scipio (consul 259 BC)
  - Epitaph of Publius Cornelius Scipio P.f. P.n. Africanus (died about 170 BC)
- The Lex Luci Spoletina (3rd century BC)
- The Senatus consultum de Bacchanalibus (186 BC)
- The Vase Inscription from Ardea
- The Carmen Arvale
- Altar to the Unknown Divinity (92 BC)

=== Literary authors ===
- Lucius Livius Andronicus (c. 280/260 BC – c. 200 BC), translator, founder of Roman drama
- Gnaeus Naevius (c. 264–201 BC), dramatist, epic poet
- Titus Maccius Plautus (c. 254–184 BC), dramatist, composer of comedies
- Quintus Ennius (239 – c. 169 BC), poet
- Marcus Pacuvius (c. 220–130 BC), tragic dramatist, poet
- Statius Caecilius (220 – 168/166 BC), comic dramatist
- Publius Terentius Afer (195/185 – 159 BC), comic dramatist
- Marcus Porcius Cato (234–149 BC), orator, historian, topical writer
- Lucius Accius (170 – c. 86 BC), tragic dramatist, philologist
- Gaius Lucilius (c. 160s – 103/102 BC), satirist
- Quintus Lutatius Catulus (2nd century BC), public officer, epigrammatist
- Aulus Furius Antias (2nd century BC), poet
- Gaius Julius Caesar Strabo Vopiscus (130–87 BC), public officer, tragic dramatist
- Lucius Pomponius Bononiensis (2nd century BC), comic dramatist, satirist
- Lucius Cassius Hemina (2nd century BC), historian
- Lucius Calpurnius Piso Frugi (2nd century BC), historian
- Manius Manilius (2nd century BC), public officer, jurist
- Lucius Coelius Antipater (2nd century BC), jurist, historian
- Publius Sempronius Asellio (158 BC – after 91 BC), military officer, historian
- Gaius Sempronius Tuditanus (2nd century BC), jurist
- Lucius Afranius (2nd and 1st centuries BC), comic dramatist
- Titus Albucius (2nd and 1st centuries BC), orator
- Publius Rutilius Rufus (158 BC – after 78 BC), jurist
- Lucius Aelius Stilo Praeconinus (154–74 BC), philologist
- Quintus Claudius Quadrigarius (2nd and 1st centuries BC), historian
- Valerius Antias (2nd and 1st centuries BC), historian
- Lucius Cornelius Sisenna (121–67 BC), soldier, historian
- Quintus Cornificius (2nd and 1st centuries BC), rhetorician

== Script ==
Old Latin surviving in inscriptions is written in various forms of the Etruscan alphabet as it evolved into the Latin alphabet. The writing conventions varied by time and place until classical conventions prevailed. A part of old inscriptions, texts in the original writing system have been lost or transcribed by later copyists.

Old Latin could be written from right to left (as were Etruscan and early Greek) or boustrophedon.

== Orthography ==
Some differences between old and classical Latin were of spelling only; pronunciation is thought to be essentially the same as in classical Latin:

- Single for double consonants: Marcelus for Marcellus
- Double vowels for long vowels: aara for āra
- q for c before u: pequnia for pecunia
- c for g: Caius for Gaius

These differences did not necessarily run concurrently with each other and were not universal; that is, c was used for both c and g.

== Phonology ==
=== Stress ===
Old Latin is thought to have had a strong stress on the first syllable of a word until about 250 BC. All syllables other than the first were unstressed and were subjected to greater amounts of phonological weakening. Starting around that time, the Classical Latin stress system began to develop. It passed through at least one intermediate stage, found in Plautus, in which the stress occurred on the fourth last syllable in four-syllable words with all short syllables.

=== Vowels ===
Diphthong changes from Old Latin (left) to Classical Latin (right)

Monophthongs
	Front	Central	Back
Close	i ⟨I⟩	(ɨ ⟨I⟩ ~ ʉ ⟨V⟩)	u ⟨V⟩
Close-mid	e ⟨E⟩		o ⟨O⟩
Open		ä ⟨A⟩	

Diphthongs
		Endpoint	
		/i̯/ ⟨-I⟩	/u̯/ ⟨-V⟩
Start point	/ä/ ⟨A-⟩	äi̯ ⟨AI⟩	äu̯ ⟨AV⟩
Start point	/e/ ⟨E-⟩	ei̯ ⟨EI⟩	eu̯ ⟨EV⟩
Start point	/o/ ⟨O-⟩	oi̯ ⟨OI⟩	ou̯ ⟨OV⟩

Most original PIE (Proto-Indo-European) diphthongs were preserved in stressed syllables, including /ai/ (later ae); /ei/ (later ī); /oi/ (later ū, or sometimes oe); /ou/ (from PIE /eu/ and /ou/; later ū).

The Old Latin diphthong ei evolves in stages: ei > ẹ̄ > ī. The intermediate sound ẹ̄ was simply written e but must have been distinct from the normal long vowel ē because ẹ̄ subsequently merged with ī while ē did not. It is generally thought that ẹ̄ was a higher sound than e (e.g. perhaps [eː] vs. [ɛː] during the time when both sounds existed). Even after the original vowel /ei/ had merged with ī, the old spelling ei continued to be used for a while, with the result that ei came to stand for ī and began to be used in the spelling of original occurrences of ī that did not evolve from ei (e.g. in the genitive singular -ī, which is always spelled -i in the oldest inscriptions but later on can be spelled either -i or -ei).

In unstressed syllables, *oi and *ai had already merged into ei by historical times (except for one possible occurrence of poploe for populī "people" in a late manuscript of one of the early songs). This eventually also evolved to ī.

Old Latin often had different short vowels from Classical Latin, reflecting sound changes that had not yet taken place. For example, the very early Duenos inscription has the form duenos "good", later found as duonos, and still later bonus. A countervailing change wo > we occurred around 150 BC in certain contexts, and many earlier forms are found (e.g. earlier votō, voster, vorsus vs. later vetō, vester, versus).

Old Latin frequently preserves original PIE thematic case endings -os and -om (later -us and -um).

=== Consonants ===
		Labial	Coronal	Palatal	Velar		Glottal
		Labial	Coronal	Palatal	plain	labialized	Glottal
Plosive	voiced	b ⟨B⟩	d ⟨D⟩		ɡ ⟨C, K⟩	(ɡʷ) ⟨QV⟩	
Plosive	voiceless	p ⟨P⟩	t ⟨T⟩		k ⟨C, K⟩	(kʷ) ⟨QV⟩	
Fricative	voiced		(z ⟨S⟩)^{1}				
Fricative	voiceless	ɸ ⟨F⟩^{2}	s ⟨S⟩				h ⟨H⟩
Nasal		m ⟨M⟩	n ⟨N⟩				
Rhotic			r ⟨R⟩				
Approximant			l ⟨L⟩	j ⟨I⟩		w ⟨V⟩	

^{1} Intervocalic /s/ (pronounced [z]) was preserved up to 350 BC or so, at which point it changed into /r/ (rhotacism). This rhotacism had implications for declension: early classical Latin, honos, honoris; later Classical (by analogy) honor, honoris ("honor"). Some Old Latin texts preserve /s/ in this position, such as the Carmen Arvale's lases for lares. Later instances of single /s/ between vowels are mostly due either to reduction of early /ss/ after long vowels or diphthongs, borrowings, or late reconstructions.
^{2} Might have been an /f/ sound instead, perhaps in free variation. Lloyd, Sturtevant, and Kent make this argument based on misspellings in early inscriptions, the fact that many instances of Latin /f/ descend from Proto-Indo-European *bʰ, and the outcomes of the sound in Romance (particularly in Spain).

There are many unreduced clusters, e.g. iouxmentom (later iūmentum, "beast of burden"); losna (later lūna, "moon") < *lousna < */leuksnā/; cosmis (> cōmis, "courteous"); stlocum, acc. (> locum, "place").

Early du /dw/ becomes b: duenos > duonos > bonus "good"; duis > bis "twice"; duellom > bellum "war".

Final /d/ occurred in ablatives, such as puellād "from the girl" or campōd "from the field", later puellā and campō. In verb conjugation, the third-person ending -d later became -t, e.g. Old Latin faced > Classical facit.

== Morphology ==
=== Nouns ===
Latin nouns have grammatical case, with an ending, or suffix, showing its use in the sentence: subject, predicate, etc. A case for a given word is formed by suffixing a case ending to a part of the word common to all its cases called a stem. Stems are classified by their last letters as vowel or consonant. Vowel stems are formed by adding a suffix to a shorter and more ancient segment called a root. Consonant stems are the root (roots end in consonants). The combination of the last letter of the stem and the case ending often results in an ending also called a case ending or termination. For example, the stem puella- receives a case ending -m to form the accusative case puellam in which the termination -am is evident.

In Classical Latin textbooks the declensions are named from the letter ending the stem or First, Second, etc. to Fifth. A declension may be illustrated by a paradigm, or listing of all the cases of a typical word. This method is less often applied to Old Latin, and with less validity. In contrast to Classical Latin, Old Latin reflects the evolution of the language from an ancestor spoken in Latium. The endings are multiple. Their use depends on time and place. Any paradigm selected would be subject to these constraints and if applied to the language universally would give false constructs, hypothetical words not attested in the Old Latin corpus. Nevertheless, the endings are shown below by quasi-classical paradigms. Alternate endings from different stages of development are given, but they may not be attested for the word of the paradigm. For example, in the second declension, *campoe "fields" is unattested, but poploe "peoples" is attested.

The locative was a separate case in Old Latin but gradually became reduced in function, and the locative singular form eventually merged with the genitive singular by regular sound change. In the plural, the locative was captured by the ablative case in all Italic languages before Old Latin.

==== First declension (a) ====
	puellā, –ās girl, maiden f.	
	Singular	Plural
Nominative	puella	puellāi
Vocative	puella	puellai
Accusative	puellam	puellās
Genitive	puellās, puellāī, puellais	puellom
Dative	puellāi	puelleis, puellābos
Ablative	puellād	puelleis, puellābos
Locative	(Rōmai)	(Syrācūseis)

The stems of nouns of this declension usually end in -a and are typically feminine. There are some nominative singular forms in Plautus that, based on their scansion, are probably to be read as containing a final long vowel -ā. However, these forms are probably the result of Hellenizing influence rather than a genuine archaism. A nominative case ending of -s in a few masculines indicates the nominative singular case ending may have been originally -s: paricidas for later parricida, but the -s tended to get lost. In the nominative plural, -ī replaced original -s as in the genitive singular.

In the genitive singular, the -s was replaced with -ī from the second declension, the resulting diphthong shortening to -ai subsequently becoming -ae. The original form is maintained in some formulas, e.g. pater familiās. The genitive plural ending -āsōm (classical -ārum following rhotacism), borrowed from the pronouns, began to overtake original -om.

The dative singular ending was -āi, from earlier Proto-Italic *-āi. The form -āi is attested in Old Latin forms such as Dianai. However, in some Old Latin dialects, primarily those spoken outside of Rome, the dative singular ending monophthongized to <a>, which likely orthographically represents underlying -ā. This variant development is comparable to the monophthongization of Proto-Italic *-ōi to -ō in the second-declension.

In the accusative singular, Latin regularly shortens a vowel before final m.

In the ablative singular, -d was regularly lost after a long vowel. In the dative and ablative plural, the -abos descending from Indo-European *-ābhos is used for feminines only (deabus). *-ais > -eis > -īs is adapted from -ois of the o-declension.

The vocative singular had inherited short -a. This later merged with the nominative singular when original *-ā was shortened to -ă.

The locative case would not apply to such a meaning as puella, so Roma, which is singular, and Syracusae, which is plural, have been substituted. The locative plural has already merged with the -eis form of the ablative.

==== Second declension (o) ====
	campos, –ī field, plain m.		saxom, –ī rock, stone n.	
	Singular	Plural	Singular	Plural
Nominative	campos	campei < campoi	saxom	saxā, saxă
Vocative	campe	campei < campoi	saxom	saxă
Accusative	campom	campōs	saxom	saxā, saxă
Genitive	campī	campōm	saxī	saxōm
Dative	campō	campeis < campois	saxō	saxeis < saxois
Ablative	campōd	campeis < campois	saxōd	saxeis < saxois
Locative	campei	campeis < campois	saxei	saxeis < saxois

The stems of the nouns of the o-declension end in ŏ deriving from the o-grade of Indo-European ablaut. Classical Latin evidences the development ŏ > ŭ. Nouns of this declension are either masculine or neuter.

Nominative singulars ending in -ros or -ris syncopate the ending: *agros > *agrs > *agers > *agerr > ager. (The form terr "three times" for later ter < *tris appears in Plautus.)

Many alternative spellings occur:

- As mentioned above, the sound change -ei > -ẹ̄ > -ī leads to many variations, including the reverse spelling ei for ī. This spelling eventually appears in the genitive singular as well, though -ī is earliest and the true ending; cf. populi Romanei, "of the Roman people.", with both spellings in the same inscription.
- Likewise, the sound changes -os > -us and -ōm > -om > -um affect the nominative and accusative singular, and the genitive plural.
- One very early text, the Lapis Satricanus, has genitive -osio (an ending found in several other archaic languages descended from Proto-Indo-European [PIE], languages such as Vedic Sanskrit, Old Persian, and Homeric Greek) rather than -ī (an ending appearing only in Italo-Celtic). This form also appears in the closely related Faliscan language.
- In the genitive plural, -um (from PIE *-ōm) survived in classical Latin "words for coins and measures"; otherwise it was eventually replaced by -ōrum by analogy with 1st declension -ārum.
- The nominative/vocative plural masculine -ei comes from the PIE pronominal ending *-oi. The original ending -oi appears in a late spelling in the word poploe (i.e. "poploi" = populī "people") in Sextus Pompeius Festus.
- The dative/ablative/locative plural -eis comes from earlier -ois, a merger of PIE instrumental plural *-ōis and locative plural *-oisu. The form -ois appears in Sextus Pompeius Festus and a few early inscriptions.
- The Praeneste Fibula has dative singular Numasiōi, representing PIE *-ōi.
- A number of "provincial texts" have nominative plural -eis (later -īs from 190 BC on), with an added s, by some sort of analogy with other declensions. Sihler (1995) notes that this form appears in literature only in pronouns and suggests that inscriptional examples added to nouns may be artificial (i.e. not reflecting actual pronunciation).
- In the vocative singular, some nouns lose the -e (i.e. have a zero ending) but not necessarily the same as in classical Latin. The -e alternates regularly with -us.

==== Third declension (consonant/i) ====
	rēx, rēges king m.		ignis -is fire m.	
	Singular	Plural	Singular	Plural
Nominative	rēx	rēgeīs, rēgīs, rēgēs, rēgĕs	ignis, ignes	igneīs, ignēs, ignīs, ignĕs
Vocative	rēx	rēgeīs, rēgīs, rēgēs, rēgĕs	ignis, ignes	igneīs, ignēs, ignīs, ignĕs
Accusative	rēgem	rēgeīs, rēgīs, rēgēs	ignim	igneīs, ignēs, ignīs
Genitive	rēges, rēgis, rēgos, rēgus	rēgom, rēgum, rēgerum	ignis	igniom, ignium
Dative	rēgei, rēgī, rēgē, rēgĕ	rēgebus, rēgebūs, rēgibos, rēgibus	igni, igneī, ignē	ignebus, ignebūs, ignibos, ignibus
Ablative	rēgīd, rēgĭd, rēgī, rēgē, rēgĕ	rēgebus, rēgebūs, rēgibos, rēgibus	ignīd, ignĭd, ignī, ignē, ignĕ	ignebus, ignebūs, ignibos, ignibus
Locative	rēgī	rēgebos	ignī	ignibos
Instrumental	rēge		igne	

This declension contains nouns that are masculine, feminine, and neuter. The stem ends in the root consonant, except in the special case where it ends in -i (i-stem declension). The i-stem, which is a vowel-stem, partly fused with the consonant-stem in the pre-Latin period and went further in Old Latin. I/y and u/w can be treated as either consonants or vowels; hence they are semi-vowels. Mixed-stem declensions are partly like consonant-stem and partly like i-stem. Consonant-stem declensions vary slightly depending on which consonant is root-final: stop-, r-, n-, s-, etc. The paradigms below include a stop-stem (reg-) and an i-stem (igni-).

For a consonant declension, in the nominative singular, the -s was affixed directly to the stem consonant, but the combination of the two consonants produced modified nominatives over the Old Latin period. The case appears in different stages of modification in different words diachronically. The Latin neuter form (not shown) is the Indo-European nominative without stem ending; for example, cor < *cord "heart".

The genitive singular endings include -is < -es and -us < *-os. In the genitive plural, some forms appear to affix the case ending to the genitive singular rather than the stem: regerum < *reg-is-um.

In the dative singular, -ī succeeded -eī and -ē after 200 BC.

In the accusative singular, -em < *-ṃ after a consonant.

In the ablative singular, the -d was lost after 200 BC. In the dative and ablative plural, the early poets sometimes used -būs.

In the locative singular, the earliest form is like the dative but over the period assimilated to the ablative.

In the instrumental singular, the earliest form is an -e during its early days.

==== Fourth declension (u) ====
The stems of the nouns of the u-declension end in ŭ and are masculine, feminine and neuter. In addition there is a ū-stem declension, which contains only a few "isolated" words, such as sūs, "pig", and is not presented here.

	senātus, –uos senate m	
	Singular	Plural
Nominative	senātus	senātūs
Vocative	senātus	senātūs
Accusative	senātum	senātūs
Genitive	senātuos, senātuis, senātī, senātous, senātūs	senātuom, senātum
Dative	senātuī	senātubus, senātibus
Ablative	senātūd, senātud	senātubus, senātibus
Locative	senāti	

==== Fifth declension (e) ====
The 'e-stem' declension's morphology matches the Classical language very nearly.

	rēs, reis thing f.	
	Singular	Plural
Nominative	rēs, reis	rēs
Vocative	rēs	rēs
Accusative	rem	rēs
Genitive	rēis, rēs	rēsom
Dative	reī	rēbos
Ablative	rēd	rēbos
Locative		
Instrumental	rē	

=== Personal pronouns ===
Personal pronouns are among the most common thing found in Old Latin inscriptions. In all three persons, the ablative singular ending is identical to the accusative singular. In Classical Latin, "ego" can be pronounced with both long and short final vowel, thus pointing at two versions of the pronoun possibly from Old Latin; the original form of the pronoun is reconstructed in Proto-Italic as *egō, with a long vowel.

	ego, I	tu, you	suī, himself, herself (etc.)
Singular
Nominative	egō/ego	tu	—
Accusative	mēd	tēd	sēd
Genitive	mis	tis	sei
Dative	mihei, mehei	tibei	sibei
Ablative	mēd	tēd	sēd
Plural
Nominative	nōs	vōs	—
Accusative	nōs	vōs	sēd
Genitive	nostrōm, -ōrum, -i	vostrōm, -ōrum, -i	sei
Dative	nōbeis, nis	vōbeis	sibei
Ablative	nōbeis, nis	vōbeis	sēd

=== Relative pronoun ===
In Old Latin, the relative pronoun is also another common concept, especially in inscriptions. The forms are quite inconsistent and leave much to be reconstructed by scholars.

queī, quaī, quod who, what
Singular
	Masculine	Feminine	Neuter
Nominative	queī	quaī	quod
Accusative	quem	quam	quod
Genitive	quoius, quoios, -a, -um/om (according to gender of whatever is owned)		
Dative	quoī, queī, quoieī, queī		
Ablative	quī, quōd	quād	quōd
Plural
	Masculine	Feminine	Neuter
Nominative	ques, queis	quaī	qua
Accusative	quōs	quās	qua
Genitive	quōm, quōrom	quōm, quārom	quōm, quōrom
Dative	queis, quīs		
Ablative	queis, quīs		

=== Verbs ===
==== Old present and perfects ====
There is little evidence of the inflection of Old Latin verb forms and the few surviving inscriptions hold many inconsistencies between forms. Therefore, the forms below are ones that are both proved by scholars through Old Latin inscriptions, and recreated by scholars based on other early Indo-European languages such as Greek and Italic dialects such as Oscan and Umbrian, and which also may be compared to modern Spanish.

	Indicative present: sum				Indicative present: facio			
	Old		Classical		Old		Classical	
	Singular	Plural	Singular	Plural	Singular	Plural	Singular	Plural
First person	(e)som	somos, sumos	sum	sumus	fac(e/ī)ō	fac(e)imos	faciō	facimus
Second person	es	esteīs	es	estis	fac(e/ī)s	fac(e/ī)teis	facis	facitis
Third person	est	sont	est	sunt	fac(e/ī)d/-(e/i)t	fac(e/ī)ont	facit	faciunt

	Indicative perfect: sum				Indicative perfect: facio			
	Old		Classical		Old		Classical	
	Singular	Plural	Singular	Plural	Singular	Plural	Singular	Plural
First person	fuei	fuemos	fuī	fuimus	(fe)fecei	(fe)fecemos	fēcī	fēcimus
Second person	fuistei	fuisteīs	fuistī	fuistis	(fe)fecistei	(fe)fecisteis	fēcistī	fēcistis
Third person	fued/fuit	fueront/-erom	fuit	fuērunt/-ēre	(fe)feced/-et	(fe)feceront/-erom	fēcit	fēcērunt/-ēre

== In popular fiction ==
The 2019 film The First King: Birth of an Empire and the 2020–2022 TV series Romulus, both by Italian director Matteo Rovere, have dialogue in a reconstructed version of Old Latin. However, the linguists had to make concessions for ease of filming, and in order not to go too much against the expectations of viewers. For example, the character of the Lady of the Wolves is Lukwòsom Pòtnia (an allusion to Homer's Potnia theron, "Lady of Animals") since Latin domina ("mistress") did not have the desired nuances. Additionally, before rhotacism, Old Latin had lots of sibilants, so some had to be substituted to ease the actors' work.

== See also ==
- Italic languages
- Saturnian (poetry)

== Bibliography ==
- Adamik, Béla (2015), The Periodization of Latin: an Old Question Revisited., Uppsala Universitet, ISBN 978-91-554-9271-7
- Allen, Frederic de Forest (1897). Remnants of Early Latin. Ginn.
- Allen, William Sidney (1978) [1965]. Vox Latina—a Guide to the Pronunciation of Classical Latin (2nd ed.). Cambridge University Press. ISBN 0-521-37936-9.
- Baldi, Philip (2002). The Foundations of Latin. Berlin, New York: Mouton de Gruyter. ISBN 3-11-016294-6.
- Bennett, Charles Edwin (1895). A Latin Grammar: With Appendix for Teachers and Advanced Students. Boston, Chicago: Allyn and Bacon.
- Bennett, Charles Edwin (1907). The Latin Language: A Historical Outline of Its Sounds, Inflections, and Syntax. Allyn and Bacon.
- Bennett, Charles Edwin (1910). Syntax of Early Latin. Boston: Allyn and Bacon.
- Buck, Carl Darling (1933). Comparative Grammar of Greek and Latin. Chicago: University of Chicago.
- Clackson, James; Horrocks, Geoffrey (2007). The Blackwell History of the Latin Language. Blackwell Publishing. ISBN 978-1-4051-6209-8.
- de Vaan, Michiel (2008). Etymological Dictionary of Latin and the other Italic Languages. Brill. ISBN 978-90-04-16797-1.
- Gildersleeve, Basil Lanneau; Lodge, Gonzalez (1900). Gildersleeve's Latin grammar (3rd ed.). New York, Boston, New Orleans, London: University Publishing Company.
- Lindsay, Wallace Martin (1894). The Latin language: an historical account of Latin sounds, stems and flexions. Oxford: Clarendon Press.
- Lloyd, Paul M. (1987). From Latin to Spanish. Diane Publishing. ISBN 978-0-87169-173-6.
- Palmer, Leonard Robert (1988) [1954]. The Latin language. Norman: University of Oklahoma Press.
- Penney, John (19 August 2011), "Archaic and Old Latin", in Clackson, James (ed.), A Companion to the Latin Language (1 ed.), Wiley, pp. 220–235, doi:10.1002/9781444343397.ch14, ISBN 978-1-4051-8605-6
- Sihler, Andrew L. (1995), New Comparative Grammar of Greek and Latin, Oxford University Press, ISBN 0-19-508345-8
- Roby, Henry John (1872). A grammar of the Latin language from Plautus to Suetonius. Vol. I (2nd ed.). London: MacMillan and Co.
- Weiss, Michael L. (2009). Outline of the Historical and Comparative Grammar of Latin. Ann Arbor: Beech Stave Press. ISBN 978-0-9747927-5-0.
- Weiss, Michael (2024), "Very Old Latin", in Eska, Joseph F.; Hackstein, Olav; Kim, Ronald I.; Mondon, Jean-François (eds.), The Method Works: Studies on Language Change in Honor of Don Ringe, Cham: Springer International Publishing, pp. 113–139, doi:10.1007/978-3-031-48959-4_7, ISBN 978-3-031-48959-4
- Wordsworth, John (1874). Fragments and specimens of early Latin, with Introduction and Notes. Oxford: Clarendon Press.
