= Wolfgang Helbig =

German classical archaeologist

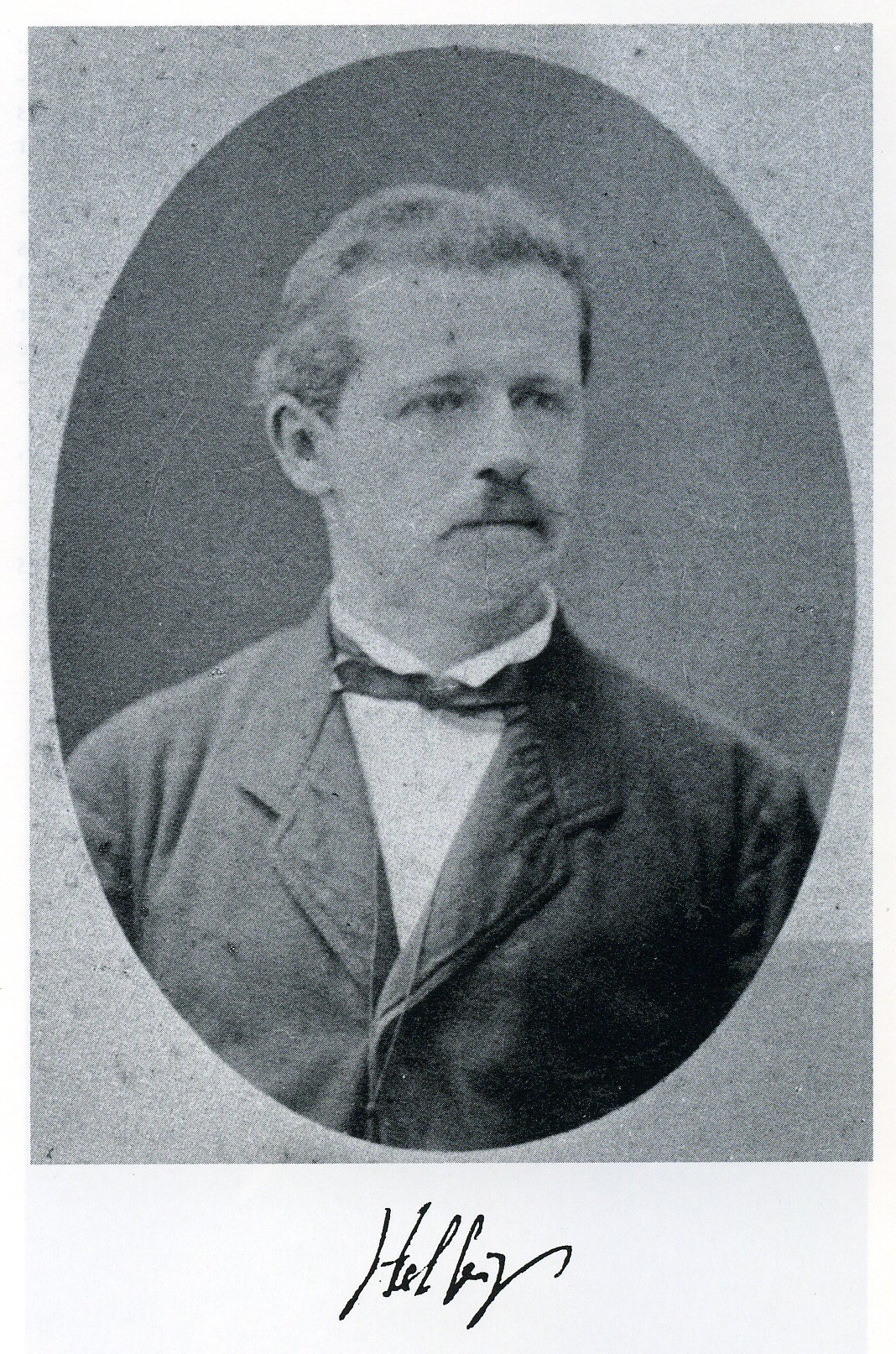
Wolfgang Helbig.

Wolfgang Helbig (2 February 1839 – 6 October 1915) was a German classical archaeologist born in Dresden. He is known for his studies involving the wall paintings of Campania (Pompeii).

== Biography ==
From 1856 to 1861 he studied philology and archaeology at the University of Göttingen, where he became member of Burschenschaft Hannovera (fraternity), and also at the University of Bonn, where he was a student of Otto Jahn, Friedrich Gottlieb Welcker and Friedrich Wilhelm Ritschl. He received his doctorate at Bonn in 1861 with the thesis "Questiones scaenicae". In 1862 he became a member of the German Archaeological Institute (DAI) to Rome. In 1865 he succeeded Heinrich Brunn as second secretary at the DAI, a position he kept until 1887.

During his career he traveled extensively throughout Italy, Greece, Russia, France and North Africa. Beginning in 1887, he lived in Rome as a private scholar and art dealer, and served as a broker of numerous works of art for the Ny Carlsberg Glyptotek in Copenhagen.

In 1887, he presented for some time the controversial Praeneste fibula. In 1892, he published the first edition of "Führer durch die öffentlichen Sammlungen klassischer Altertümer in Rom", a very popular guide to classical antiquities in Rome.

He married the Russian princess Nadezhda Shakhovskaya (later Nadine Helbig). Both founded and supported an important literary and artistic salon in Rome.

He died in 1915 in Rome.

== Selected publications ==
- Wandgemälde der vom Vesuv verschütteten Städte Kampaniens (Murals of the cities of Campania buried by Vesuvius), Leipzig 1868.
- Untersuchungen über die Campanische Wandmalerei (Studies of Campanian wall painting), Leipzig 1873.
- Die Italiker in der Po-Ebene (The ancient Italic peoples of the Po River plain), Leipzig 1879.
- Das homerische Epos, aus den Denkmälern erläutert (The Homeric epic, explained from the monuments), Leipzig 1884, second edition 1887.
