= Albucia gens =

Ancient Roman family

The gens Albucia or Albutia was a minor plebeian family at Ancient Rome family, known from the late second century BC to the first century AD. This gens may have been of Ligurian or Gallic origin, as one of the best-known individuals of this name was a native of the town of Novaria in Cisalpine Gaul.

== Members ==
- Titus Albucius, an orator and scholar of Greek literature, praetor in Sardinia in 105 BC.
- Gaius Albucius Silus, a rhetorician and legal advocate from Novaria, came to Rome in the time of Augustus, practicing there and at Mediolanum.
- Albucilla, accused of treason in AD 37.
- Albucius, a wealthy physician at Rome during the first century.

== See also ==
- List of Roman gentes
