= Garigliano bowl =

Impasto bowl from c. 500 BCE

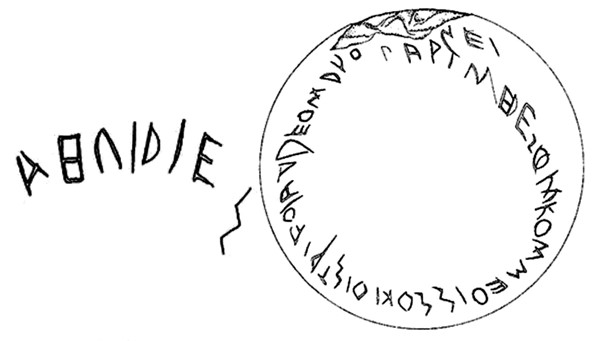
The text of the Garigliano bowl

The Garigliano bowl is a small impasto bowl with bucchero glaze likely to have been produced around 500 BC, with an early Latin inscription written in a form of the western Greek or Etruscan alphabet. It was found along the river Garigliano, between Lazio and Campania, in the vicinity of ancient Minturnae (now Minturno, Italy), in the ancient territory occupied by the Aurunci.

A: AHUIDIES
B: NEI[- - -]PARIMEDESOMKOMMEOISSOKIOISTRIVOIADDEOMDUO

As for word division, NEI PARI MED ESOM KOM MEOIS SOKIOIS is clear; the rest is controversial. Brent Vine, however, offers the following interpretation:

Archaic Latin text: NEI PARI MED ESOM KOM MEOIS SOKIOIS TRIFOS AUDEOM DUO[M]

Classical Latin version: nē pare (nōlī capere) mē! sum cum meīs sociīs tribus Audiōrum duōrum

English translation: Do not take me! I am with my three companions (property) of the two Audii

== Sources ==
- Baldi, Philip (2002). The Foundations of Latin.
- Harvey, Paul B. (2000). "The inscribed bowl from the Garigliano (Minturnae): local diversity and Romanization in the 4th c. B.C." (PDF). Journal of Roman Archaeology. 13 (1): 164–174. doi:10.1017/S1047759400018833. S2CID 162217035.
- Vine, Brent (August 2002). "Some 'Trivial' remarks on the 'Garigliano bowl' inscription: A response to P. Harvey (JRA 13, 2000)".
