= Satriena gens =

The gens Satriena was an obscure plebeian family at ancient Rome. No members of this gens obtained any of the higher offices of the Roman state, but a number are known from coins and inscriptions.

== Origin ==
The nomen Satrienus belongs to a class of gentilicia formed from other nomina using the suffix -enus. The root of the name is Satrius, the nomen of a more prominent gens.

== Praenomina ==
The praenomina used by the Satrieni include Publius, Quintus, Gaius, and Lucius, four of the most common names throughout Roman history.

== Branches and cognomina ==
The Satrieni used a variety of common surnames, including Pollio, a polisher, belonging to a class of cognomina derived from occupations; Salvia and Secunda, old praenomina that came to be regarded as surnames; Juvenalis, youthful, and perhaps Celsa, originally given to one who was particularly tall.

== Members ==
This list includes abbreviated praenomina. For an explanation of this practice, see filiation.

- Satriena C. f., (Note: Or perhaps Satriena Celsa.) buried at Narbo in Gallia Narbonensis, together with Gaius Aemilius Philonicus and his wife, Aemilia Secunda.
- Satriena P. f., buried at Rome.
- Satrienus, named in an inscription from Aquinum in Latium.
- Lucius Satrienus C. f., named in an inscription from Aquinum.
- Publius Satrienus, as triumvir monetalis, minted coins bearing the head of Mars, or perhaps Pallas, on the obverse, and a she-wolf on the reverse.
- Quintus Satrienus Cosmus, named in an inscription from Rome.
- Satrienus Juvenalis, a military tribune in the eleventh legion, named in an inscription from the present site of Altenburg, formerly part of Germania Superior.
- Quintus Satrienus Pollio, named in a first-century inscription from Rome.
- Satriena P. l. Salvia, a freedwoman, and the wife of Quintus Pompeius Sosus, the freedman of Bithynicus, named in a funerary inscription from Rome.
- Satriena Q. l. Secunda, a freedwoman buried at Rome.

== See also ==
- List of Roman gentes

== Bibliography ==
- Joseph Hilarius Eckhel, Doctrina Numorum Veterum (The Study of Ancient Coins, 1792–1798).
- Dictionary of Greek and Roman Biography and Mythology, William Smith, ed., Little, Brown and Company, Boston (1849).
- Theodor Mommsen et alii, Corpus Inscriptionum Latinarum (The Body of Latin Inscriptions, abbreviated CIL), Berlin-Brandenburgische Akademie der Wissenschaften (1853–present).
- René Cagnat et alii, L'Année épigraphique (The Year in Epigraphy, abbreviated AE), Presses Universitaires de France (1888–present).
- George Davis Chase, "The Origin of Roman Praenomina", in Harvard Studies in Classical Philology, vol. VIII, pp. 103–184 (1897).
- Hermann Finke, "Neue Inschriften" (New Inscriptions), in Berichte der Römisch-Germanischen Kommission, vol. 17, pp. 1–107, 198–231 (1927).
- John C. Traupman, The New College Latin & English Dictionary, Bantam Books, New York (1995).
