= Rebecca Langlands =

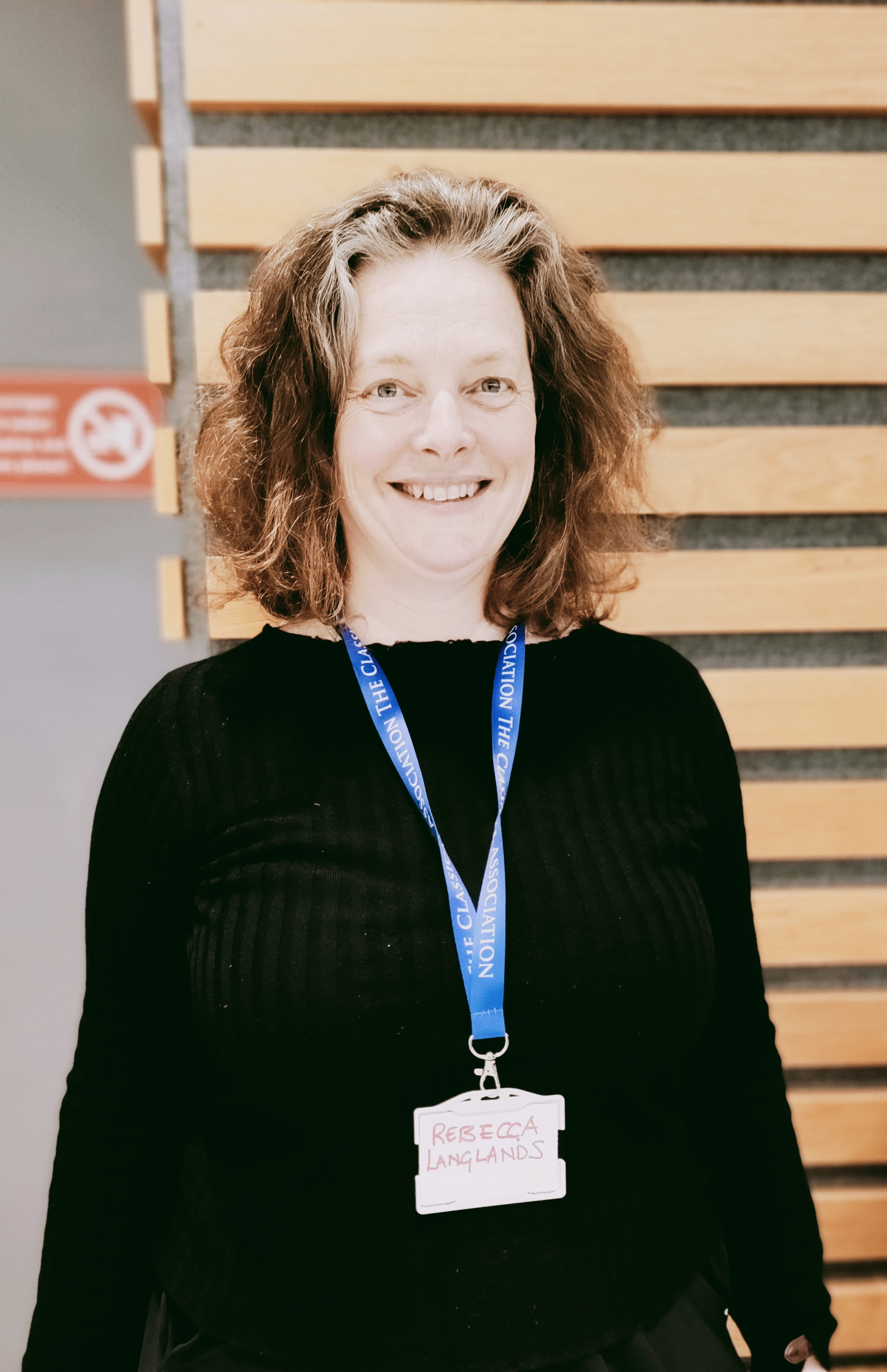

Academic background
- Education: University of Cambridge
- Thesis: Gender and exemplarity in Valerius Maximus

Academic work
- Discipline: Classics
- Institutions: University of Exeter

Rebecca Langlands is Professor of Classics at the University of Exeter. She is known in particular for her work on the history of sexuality and ethics in the Roman world.

== Career ==
Langlands studied at the University of Cambridge and wrote her PhD dissertation on Valerius Maximus at Gonville and Caius College, Cambridge funded by the British Academy and examined by Susanna Morton Braund.

Langlands moved to the University of Exeter in 1998 to teach in the Department of Classics. She was awarded a grant from the Arts and Humanities Research Council for the project Pudicitia: Sexual Ethics in Ancient Rome in February–June 2003 under its Research Leave scheme. Langlands was a visiting faculty member (2014/15) at UCLA Department of Classics. She was promoted to a full Professorship at Exeter in 2017 and delivered her Inaugural Lecture, entitled 'Stories that Slice, Scald and Bounce: Why Roman Exempla Matter' on 21 January 2019.

Langlands works on morality in the Roman world, stemming from her doctoral work on Valerius Maximus. More recently, she has focused on gender and sexuality in the ancient world generally. Langlands co-directs the project Sexual Knowledge, Sexual History with Kate Fisher and also co-directs the Sex and History project, which uses objects from history to facilitate discussion of modern sexual issues with young people. Langlands has co-written a chapter in The Palgrave Handbook of Sexuality Education on "‘Sex and History’: Talking Sex with Objects from the Past" about the project.

== Selected publications ==
- ed. with Alice König, and James Uden, Literature and Culture in the Roman Empire, 96-235: Cross-Cultural Interactions (Cambridge University Press, 2020).
- Exemplary Ethics in Ancient Rome (Cambridge University Press, 2018)
- ed. with Kate Fisher Sex, Knowledge, and Receptions of the Past (Oxford University Press, 2015)
- Sexual morality in ancient Rome (Cambridge University Press, 2006)
- Langlands, R. (2002). ‘Can You Tell What it is Yet?’ Descriptions of Sex Change in Ancient Literature. Ramus, 31(1–2), 91–110.
