= Classics =

Study of classical antiquity

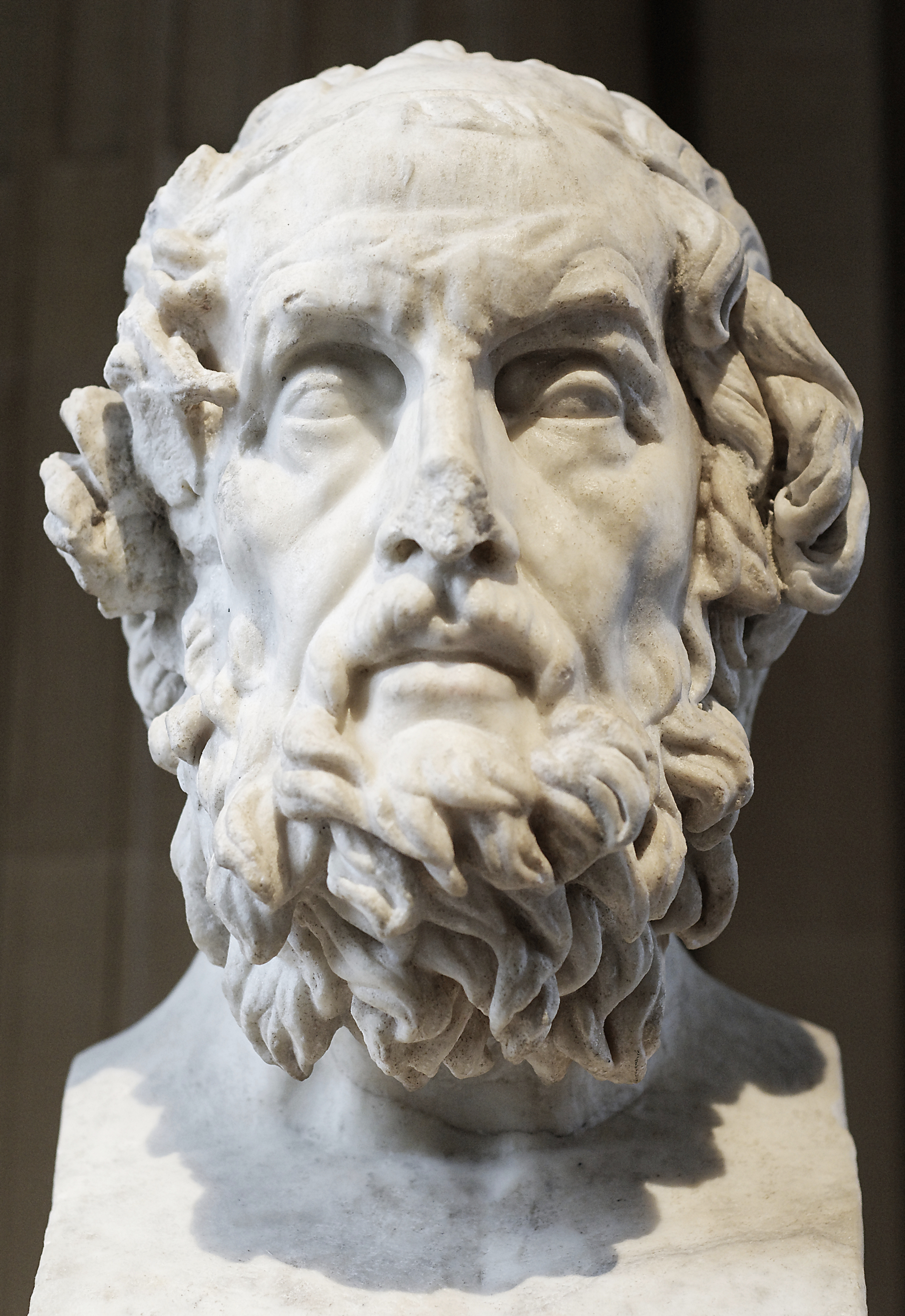
Homer, the legendary Greek author of the Iliad and Odyssey

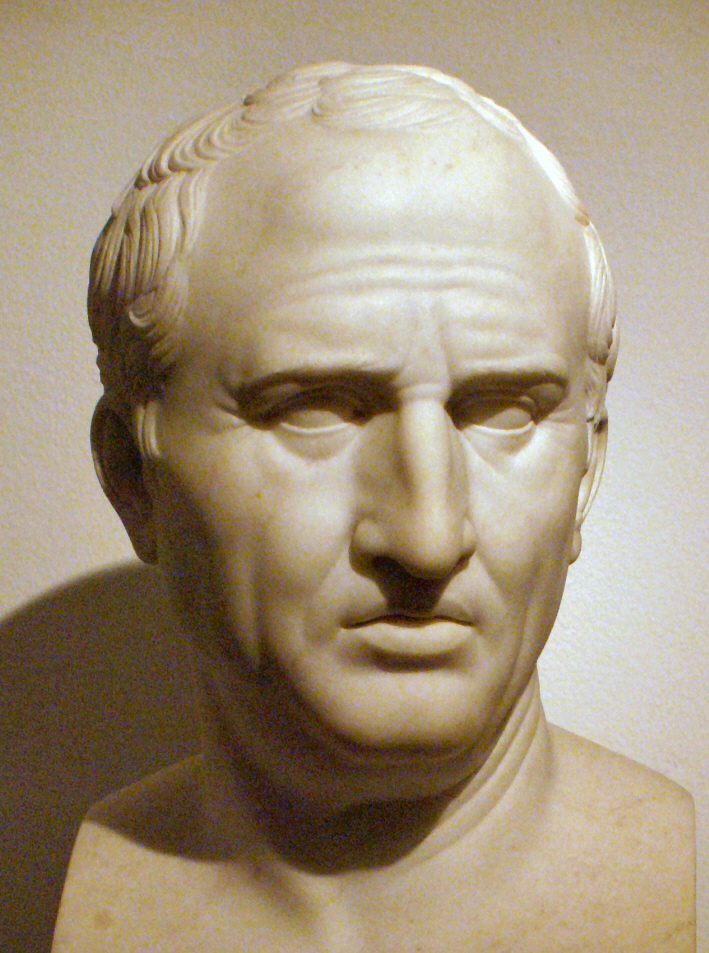
Cicero, the Roman statesman considered the master of Latin prose

Aristotle, the Greek philosopher and polymath who shaped Western science for centuries

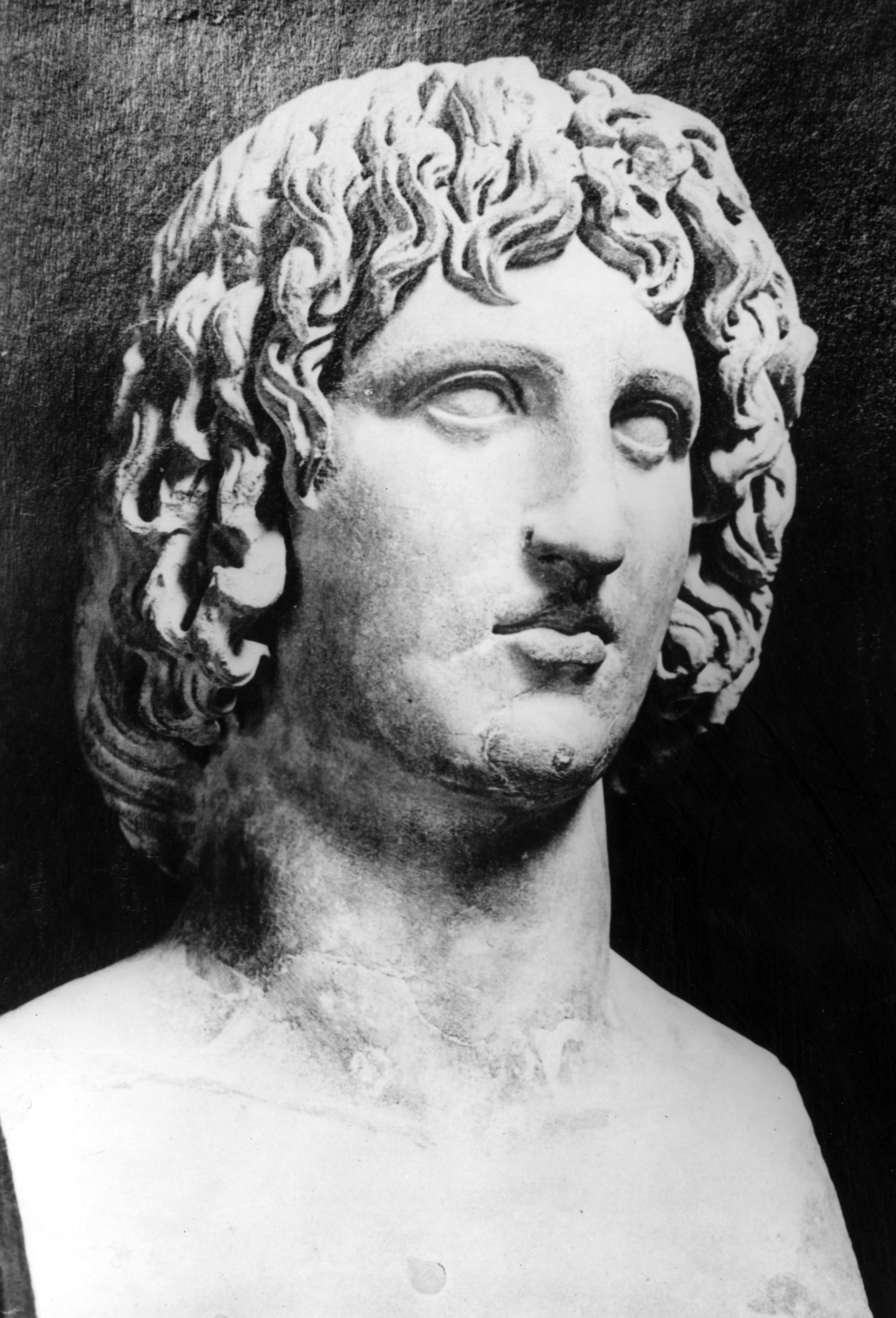
Virgil, usually considered to be the greatest Roman poet

Classics, also known as classical studies or ancient Greek and Roman studies, is the study of classical antiquity. In the Western world, classics traditionally refers to the study of ancient Greek and Roman literature and their original languages, Ancient Greek and Latin. Classics may also include as secondary subjects Greco-Roman philosophy, history, archaeology, anthropology, architecture, art, mythology, and society.

In Western civilization, the study of the ancient Greek and Roman classics was considered the foundation of the humanities, and they traditionally have been the cornerstone of an elite higher education.

== Etymology ==
The word classics is derived from the Latin adjective classicus, meaning "belonging to the highest class of citizens." The word was originally used to describe the members of the Patricians, the highest class in ancient Rome. By the 2nd century AD the word was used in literary criticism to describe writers of the highest quality. For example, Aulus Gellius, in his Attic Nights, contrasts "classicus" and "proletarius" writers. By the 6th century AD, the word had acquired a second meaning, referring to pupils at a school. Thus, the two modern meanings of the word, referring both to literature considered to be of the highest quality and the standard texts used as part of a curriculum, were both derived from Roman use. Scholars in the field are called classicists.

== History ==
=== Middle Ages ===
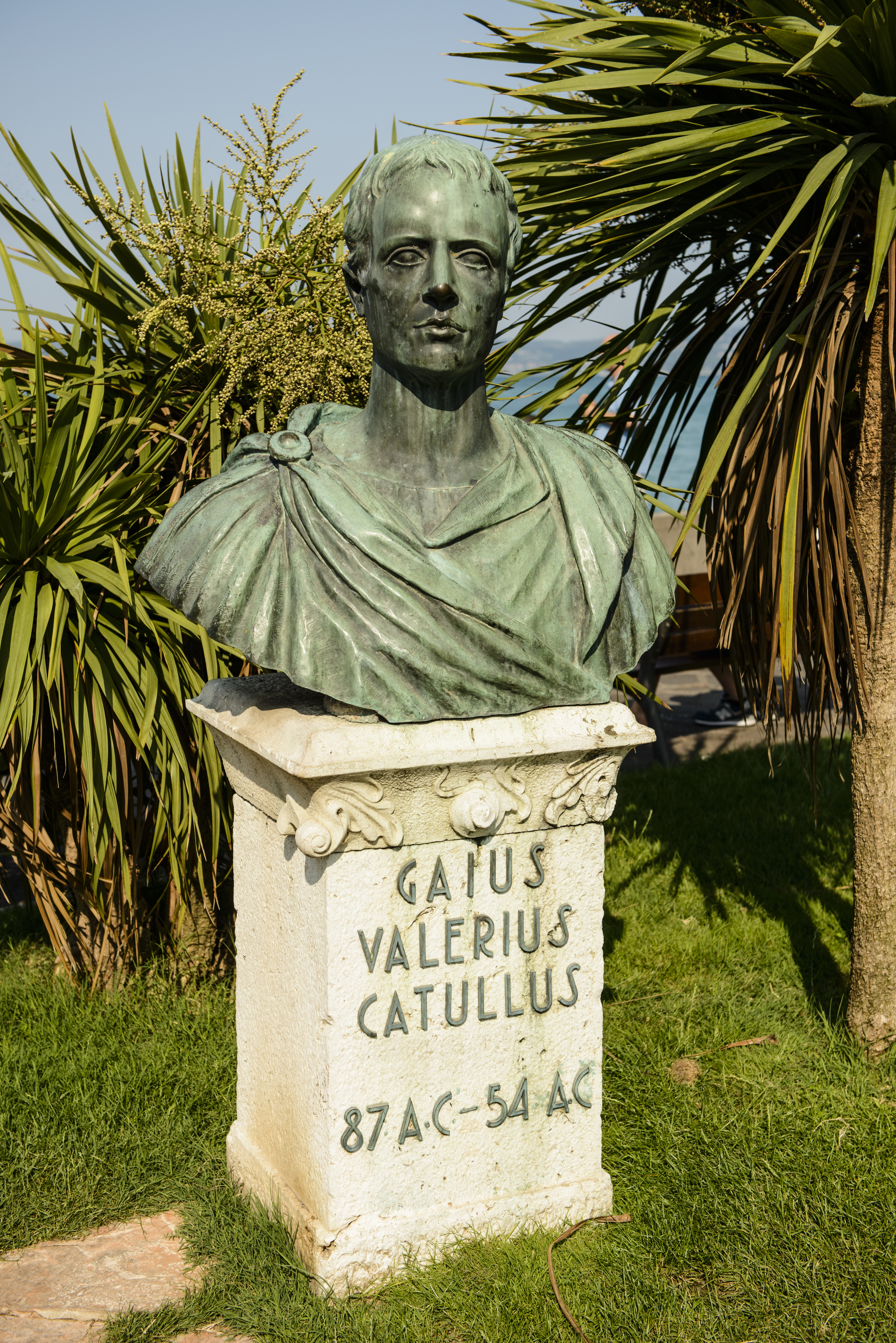
The Roman poet Catullus was virtually unknown during the medieval period, in contrast to his modern popularity.

In the Middle Ages, classics and education were tightly intertwined; according to Jan Ziolkowski, there is no era in history in which the link was tighter. Medieval education taught students to imitate earlier classical models, and Latin continued to be the language of scholarship and culture, despite the increasing difference between literary Latin and the vernacular languages of Europe during the period.

While Latin was hugely influential, according to thirteenth-century English philosopher Roger Bacon, "there are not four men in Latin Christendom who are acquainted with the Greek, Hebrew, and Arabic grammars." Greek was rarely studied in the West, and Greek literature was known almost solely in Latin translation. The works of even major Greek authors such as Hesiod, whose names continued to be known by educated Europeans, along with most of Plato, were unavailable in Christian Europe. Some were rediscovered through Arabic translations; a School of Translators was set up in the border city of Toledo, Spain, to translate from Arabic into Latin.

Along with the unavailability of Greek authors, there were other differences between the classical canon known today and the works valued in the Middle Ages. Catullus, for instance, was almost entirely unknown in the medieval period. The popularity of different authors also waxed and waned throughout the period: Lucretius, popular during the Carolingian Renaissance, was barely read in the twelfth century, while for Quintilian the reverse is true.

=== Renaissance ===
The Renaissance led to the increasing study of both ancient literature and ancient history, as well as a revival of classical styles of Latin. From the 14th century, first in Italy and then increasingly across Europe, Renaissance Humanism, an intellectual movement that "advocated the study and imitation of classical antiquity", developed. Humanism saw a reform in education in Europe, introducing a wider range of Latin authors as well as bringing back the study of Greek language and literature to Western Europe. This reintroduction was initiated by Petrarch (1304–1374) and Boccaccio (1313–1375) who commissioned a Calabrian scholar to translate the Homeric poems. This humanist educational reform spread from Italy, in Catholic countries as it was adopted by the Jesuits, and in countries that became Protestant such as England, Germany, and the Low Countries, in order to ensure that future clerics were able to study the New Testament in the original language.

=== Neoclassicism ===
The late 17th and 18th centuries are the period in Western European literary history which is most associated with the classical tradition, as writers consciously adapted classical models. Classical models were so highly prized that the plays of William Shakespeare were rewritten along neoclassical lines, and these "improved" versions were performed throughout the 18th century. In the United States, the nation's Founders were strongly influenced by the classics, and they looked in particular to the Roman Republic for their form of government.

From the beginning of the 18th century, the study of Greek became increasingly important relative to that of Latin. In this period Johann Winckelmann's claims for the superiority of the Greek visual arts influenced a shift in aesthetic judgements, while in the literary sphere, G. E. Lessing "returned Homer to the centre of artistic achievement". In the United Kingdom, the study of Greek in schools began in the late 18th century. The poet Walter Savage Landor claimed to have been one of the first English schoolboys to write in Greek during his time at Rugby School. In the United States, philhellenism began to emerge in the 1830s, with a turn "from a love of Rome and a focus on classical grammar to a new focus on Greece and the totality of its society, art, and culture."

=== 19th century ===
The 19th century saw the influence of the classical world, and the value of a classical education, decline, especially in the United States, where the subject was often criticised for its elitism. By the 19th century, little new literature was still being written in Latin — a practice which had continued as late as the 18th century — and a command of Latin declined in importance. Correspondingly, classical education from the 19th century onwards began to increasingly de-emphasise the importance of the ability to write and speak Latin. In the United Kingdom this process took longer than elsewhere. Composition continued to be the dominant classical skill in England until the 1870s, when new areas within the discipline began to increase in popularity. In the same decade came the first challenges to the requirement of Greek at the universities of Oxford and Cambridge, though it would not be finally abolished for another 50 years.

Though the influence of classics as the dominant mode of education in Europe and North America was in decline in the 19th century, the discipline was rapidly evolving in the same period. Classical scholarship was becoming more systematic and scientific, especially with the "new philology" created at the end of the 18th and beginning of the 19th century. Its scope was also broadening: it was during the 19th century that ancient history and classical archaeology began to be seen as part of classics, rather than separate disciplines.

=== 20th century to present ===
During the 20th century, the study of classics became less common. In England, for instance, Oxford and Cambridge universities stopped requiring students to have qualifications in Greek in 1920, and in Latin at the end of the 1950s. When the National Curriculum was introduced in England, Wales, and Northern Ireland in 1988, it did not mention the classics. By 2003, only about 10% of state schools in Britain offered any classical subjects to their students at all. In 2016, AQA, the largest exam board for A-Levels and GCSEs in England, Wales and Northern Ireland, announced that it would be scrapping A-Level subjects in Classical Civilisation, Archaeology, and Art History. This left just one out of five exam boards in England which still offered Classical Civilisation as a subject. The decision was immediately denounced by archaeologists and historians, with Natalie Haynes of The Guardian stating that the loss of the A-Level would deprive state school students, 93% of all students, the opportunity to study classics while making it once again the exclusive purview of wealthy private-school students.

However, the study of classics has not declined as fast elsewhere in Europe. In 2009, a review of Meeting the Challenge, a collection of conference papers about the teaching of Latin in Europe, noted that though there is opposition to the teaching of Latin in Italy, it is nonetheless still compulsory in most secondary schools. The same may also be said in the case of France or Greece. Indeed, Ancient Greek is one of the compulsory subjects in Greek secondary education, whereas in France, Latin is one of the optional subjects that can be chosen in a majority of middle schools and high schools. Ancient Greek is also still being taught, but not as much as Latin.

== Subdisciplines ==
One of the most notable characteristics of the modern study of classics is the diversity of the field. Although traditionally focused on ancient Greece and Rome, the study now encompasses the entire ancient Mediterranean world, thus expanding the studies to North Africa and parts of West Asia.

=== Philology ===
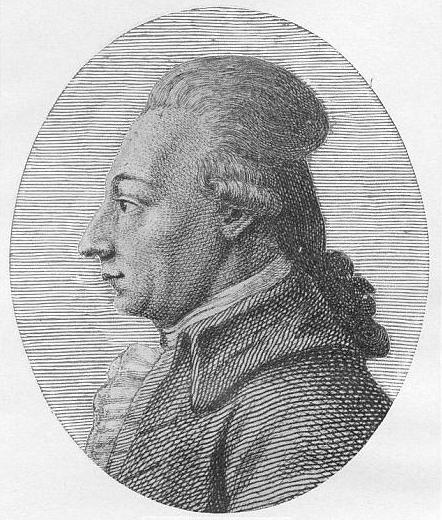
The eighteenth-century classicist Friedrich August Wolf was the author of Prolegomena to Homer, one of the first great works of classical philology.

Philology is the study of language preserved in written sources; classical philology is thus concerned with understanding any texts from the classical period written in the classical languages of Latin and Greek. The roots of classical philology lie in the Renaissance, as humanist intellectuals attempted to return to the Latin of the classical period, especially of Cicero, and as scholars attempted to produce more accurate editions of ancient texts. Some of the principles of philology still used today were developed during this period; for instance, the observation that if a manuscript could be shown to be a copy of an earlier extant manuscript, then it provides no further evidence of the original text, was made as early as 1489 by Angelo Poliziano. Other philological tools took longer to be developed: the first statement, for instance, of the principle that a more difficult reading should be preferred over a simpler one, was in 1697 by Jean Le Clerc.

The modern discipline of classical philology began in Germany at the turn of the nineteenth century. It was during this period that scientific principles of philology began to be put together into a coherent whole, in order to provide a set of rules by which scholars could determine which manuscripts were most accurate. This "new philology", as it was known, centered around the construction of a genealogy of manuscripts, with which a hypothetical common ancestor, closer to the original text than any existing manuscript, could be reconstructed.

=== Archaeology ===
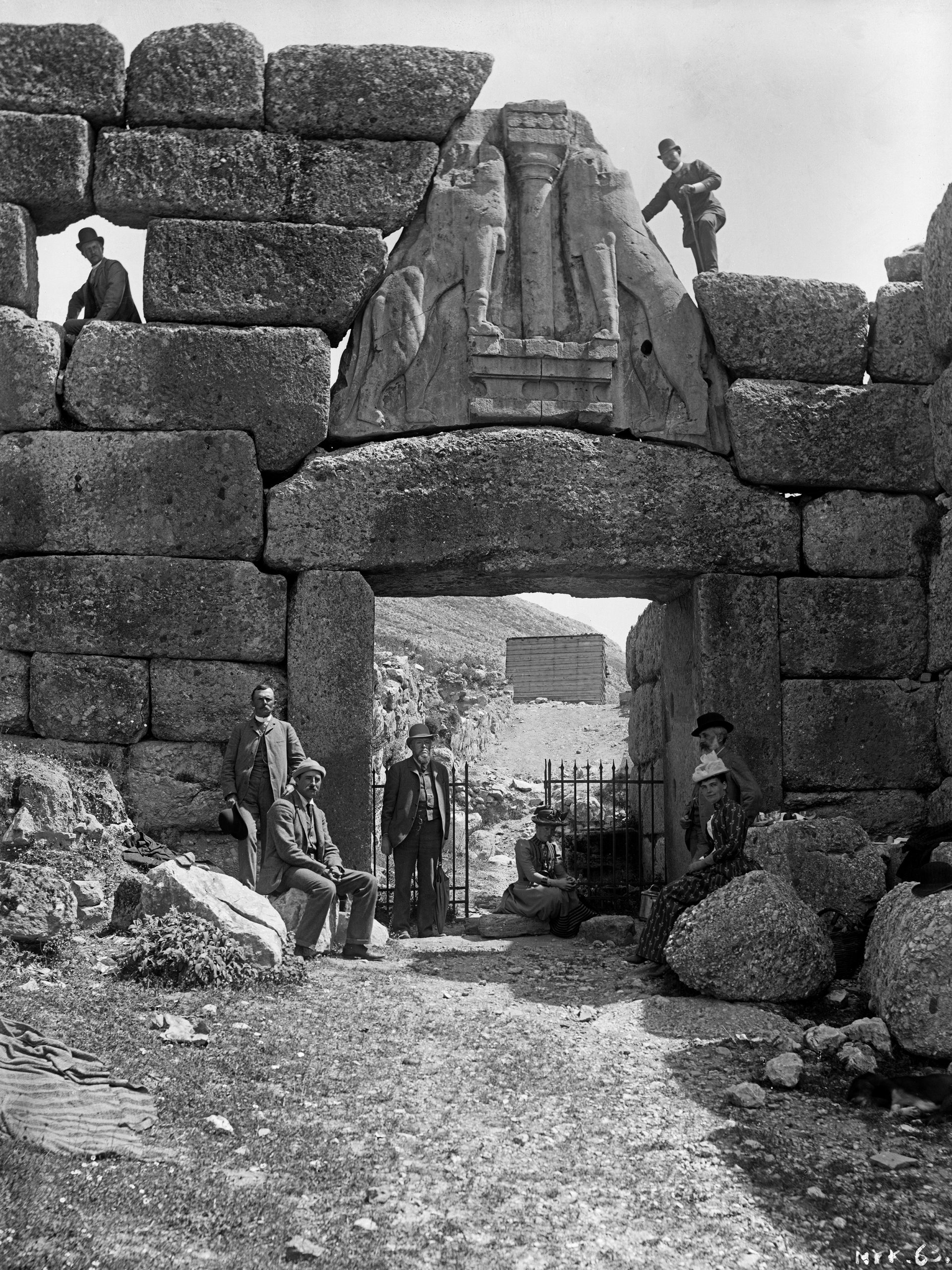
Schliemann and Dörpfeld's excavation at Mycenae was one of the earliest excavations in the field of classical archaeology.

Classical archaeology is the oldest branch of archaeology, with its roots going back to J. J. Winckelmann's work on Herculaneum in the 1760s. It was not until the last decades of the 19th century, however, that classical archaeology became part of the tradition of Western classical scholarship. It was included as part of Cambridge University's Classical Tripos for the first time after the reforms of the 1880s, though it did not become part of Oxford's Greats until much later.

The second half of the 19th century saw Schliemann's excavations of Troy and Mycenae; the first excavations at Olympia and Delos; and Arthur Evans' work in Crete, particularly on Knossos. This period also saw the foundation of important archaeological associations (e.g. the Archaeological Institute of America in 1879), including many foreign archaeological institutes in Athens and Rome (the American School of Classical Studies at Athens in 1881, British School at Athens in 1886, American Academy in Rome in 1895, and British School at Rome in 1900).

More recently, classical archaeology has taken little part in the theoretical changes in the rest of the discipline, largely ignoring the popularity of "New Archaeology", which emphasized the development of general laws derived from studying material culture, in the 1960s. New Archaeology is still criticized by traditional minded scholars of classical archaeology despite a wide acceptance of its basic techniques.

=== Art history ===
Some art historians focus their study on the development of art in the classical world. For example, ancient Greek architecture gave us the classical orders: Doric, Ionic, and Corinthian. The Parthenon is still the architectural symbol of the classical world.

Greek sculpture is well known and we know the names of several ancient Greek artists: for example, Phidias.

=== Ancient history ===
With philology, archaeology, and art history, scholars seek understanding of the history and culture of a civilization, through critical study of the extant literary and physical artefacts, in order to compose and establish a continual historic narrative of the Ancient World and its peoples. The task is difficult due to a dearth of physical evidence: for example, Sparta was a leading Greek city-state, yet little evidence of it survives to study, and what is available comes from Athens, Sparta's principal rival; likewise, the Roman Empire destroyed most evidence (cultural artefacts) of earlier, conquered civilizations, such as that of the Etruscans.

=== Philosophy ===
The English word philosophy comes from the Greek word φιλοσοφία, meaning "love of wisdom", probably coined by Pythagoras. Along with the word itself, the discipline of philosophy as we know it today has its roots in ancient Greek thought, and according to Martin West "philosophy as we understand it is a Greek creation". Ancient philosophy was traditionally divided into three branches: logic, physics, and ethics. However, not all of the works of ancient philosophers fit neatly into one of these three branches. For instance, Aristotle's Rhetoric and Poetics have been traditionally classified in the West as "ethics", but in the Arabic world were grouped with logic; in reality, they do not fit neatly into either category.

From the last decade of the eighteenth century, scholars of ancient philosophy began to study the discipline historically. Previously, works on ancient philosophy had been unconcerned with chronological sequence and with reconstructing the reasoning of ancient thinkers; with what Wolfgang-Ranier Mann calls "New Philosophy", this changed.

=== Reception studies ===
Another discipline within the classics is "reception studies", which developed in the 1960s at the University of Konstanz. Reception studies is concerned with how students of classical texts have understood and interpreted them. As such, reception studies is interested in a two-way interaction between reader and text, taking place within a historical context.

Though the idea of an "aesthetics of reception" was first put forward by Hans Robert Jauss in 1967, the principles of reception theory go back much earlier than this. As early as 1920, T. S. Eliot wrote that "the past [is] altered by the present as much as the present is directed by the past"; Charles Martindale describes this as a "cardinal principle" for many versions of modern reception theory.

== Classical Greece ==
Ancient Greece was the civilization belonging to the period of Greek history lasting from the Archaic period, beginning in the eighth century BC, to the Roman conquest of Greece after the Battle of Corinth in 146 BC. The Classical period, during the fifth and fourth centuries BC, has traditionally been considered the height of Greek civilisation. The Classical period of Greek history is generally considered to have begun with the first and second Persian invasions of Greece at the start of the Greco-Persian wars, and to have ended with the death of Alexander the Great.

Classical Greek culture had a powerful influence on the Roman Empire, which carried a version of it to many parts of the Mediterranean region and Europe; thus Classical Greece is generally considered to be the seminal culture which provided the foundation of Western civilization.

=== Language ===
Map showing the regional dialects of Greek during the Classical period

Ancient Greek is the historical stage in the development of the Greek language spanning the Archaic (c. 8th to 6th centuries BC), Classical (c. 5th to 4th centuries BC), and Hellenistic (c. 3rd century BC to 6th century AD) periods of ancient Greece and the ancient world. It is predated in the 2nd millennium BC by Mycenaean Greek. Its Hellenistic phase is known as Koine ("common") or Biblical Greek, and its late period mutates imperceptibly into Medieval Greek. Koine is regarded as a separate historical stage of its own, although in its earlier form it closely resembles Classical Greek. Prior to the Koine period, Greek of the classical and earlier periods included several regional dialects.

Ancient Greek was the language of Homer and of classical Athenian historians, playwrights, and philosophers. It has contributed many words to the vocabulary of English and many other European languages, and has been a standard subject of study in Western educational institutions since the Renaissance. Latinized forms of Ancient Greek roots are used in many of the scientific names of species and in other scientific terminology.

=== Literature ===
The earliest surviving works of Greek literature are epic poetry. Homer's Iliad and Odyssey are the earliest to survive to us today, probably composed in the eighth century BC. These early epics were oral compositions, created without the use of writing. Around the same time that the Homeric epics were composed, the Greek alphabet was introduced; the earliest surviving inscriptions date from around 750 BC.

European drama was invented in ancient Greece. Traditionally this was attributed to Thespis, around the middle of the sixth century BC, though the earliest surviving work of Greek drama is Aeschylus' tragedy The Persians, which dates to 472 BC. Early Greek tragedy was performed by a chorus and two actors, but by the end of Aeschylus' life, a third actor had been introduced, either by him or by Sophocles. The last surviving Greek tragedies are the Bacchae of Euripides and Sophocles' Oedipus at Colonus, both from the end of the fifth century BC.

Surviving Greek comedy begins later than tragedy; the earliest surviving work, Aristophanes' Acharnians, comes from 425 BC. However, comedy dates back as early as 486 BC, when the Dionysia added a competition for comedy to the much earlier competition for tragedy. The comedy of the fifth century is known as Old Comedy, and it comes down to us solely in the eleven surviving plays of Aristophanes, along with a few fragments. Sixty years after the end of Aristophanes' career, the next author of comedies to have any substantial body of work survive is Menander, whose style is known as New Comedy.

=== Mythology and religion ===
Greek mythology is the body of myths and legends belonging to the ancient Greeks concerning their gods and heroes, the nature of the world, and the origins and significance of their own cult and ritual practices. They were a part of religion in ancient Greece. Modern scholars refer to the myths and study them in an attempt to throw light on the religious and political institutions of ancient Greece and its civilization, and to gain understanding of the nature of myth-making itself.

Greek religion encompassed the collection of beliefs and rituals practiced in ancient Greece in the form of both popular public religion and cult practices. These different groups varied enough for it to be possible to speak of Greek religions or "cults" in the plural, though most of them shared similarities. Also, the Greek religion extended out of Greece and out to neighbouring islands.

Many Greek people recognized the major gods and goddesses: Zeus, Poseidon, Hades, Apollo, Artemis, Aphrodite, Ares, Dionysus, Hephaestus, Athena, Hermes, Demeter, Hestia and Hera; though philosophies such as Stoicism and some forms of Platonism used language that seems to posit a transcendent single deity. Different cities often worshipped the same deities, sometimes with epithets that distinguished them and specified their local nature.

=== Philosophy ===
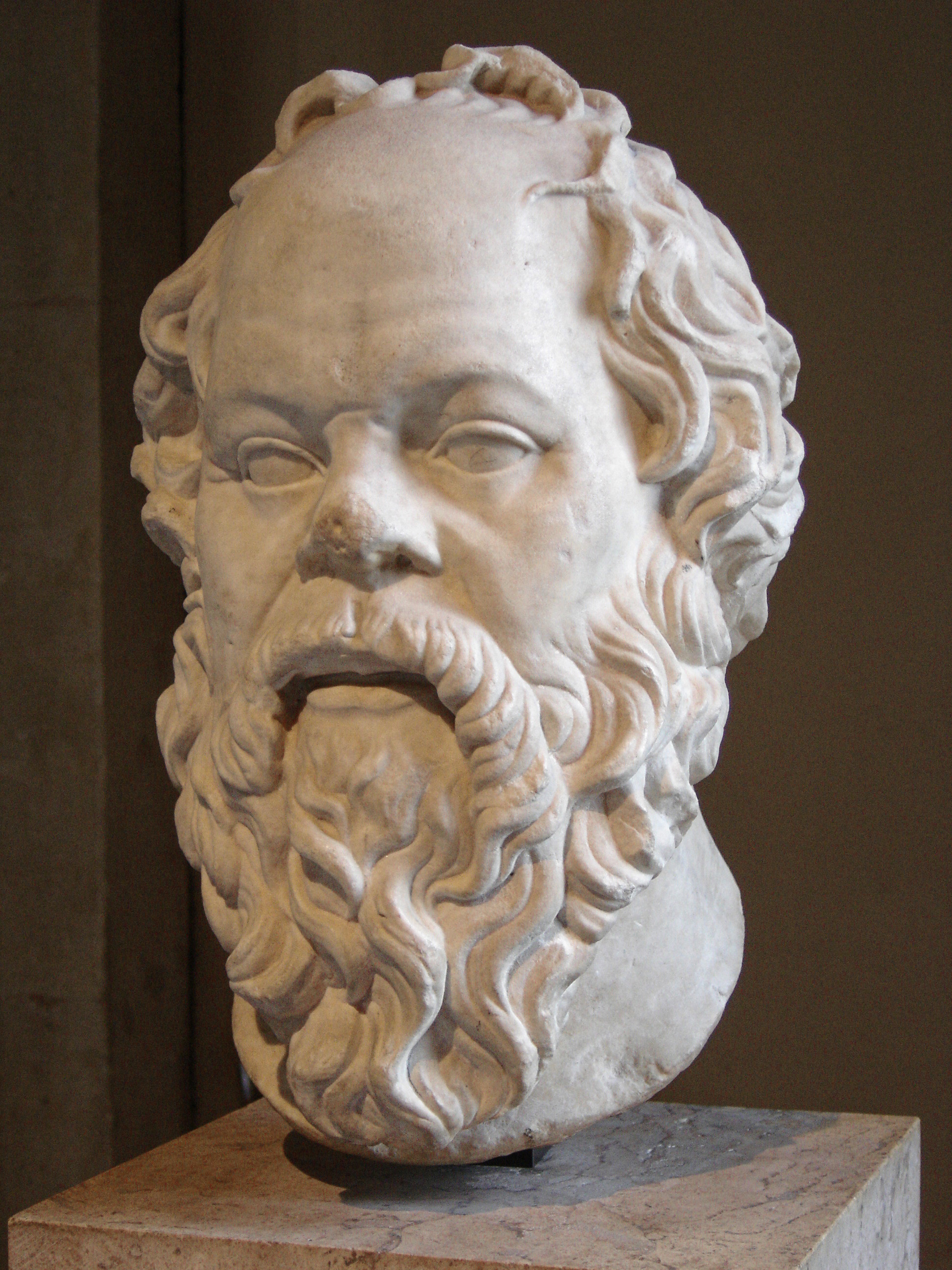
So influential was Socrates to classical philosophy that earlier philosophers are today known as pre-Socratics.

The earliest surviving philosophy from ancient Greece dates back to the 6th century BC, when according to Aristotle Thales of Miletus was considered to have been the first Greek philosopher. Other influential pre-Socratic philosophers include Pythagoras and Heraclitus. The most famous and significant figures in classical Athenian philosophy, from the 5th to the 3rd centuries BC, are Socrates, his student Plato, and Aristotle, who studied at Plato's Academy before founding his own school, known as the Lyceum. Later Greek schools of philosophy, including the Cynics, Stoics, and Epicureans, continued to be influential after the Roman annexation of Greece, and into the post-Classical world.

Greek philosophy dealt with a wide variety of subjects, including political philosophy, ethics, metaphysics, ontology, and logic, as well as disciplines which are not today thought of as part of philosophy, such as biology and rhetoric.

== Classical Rome ==
=== Language ===
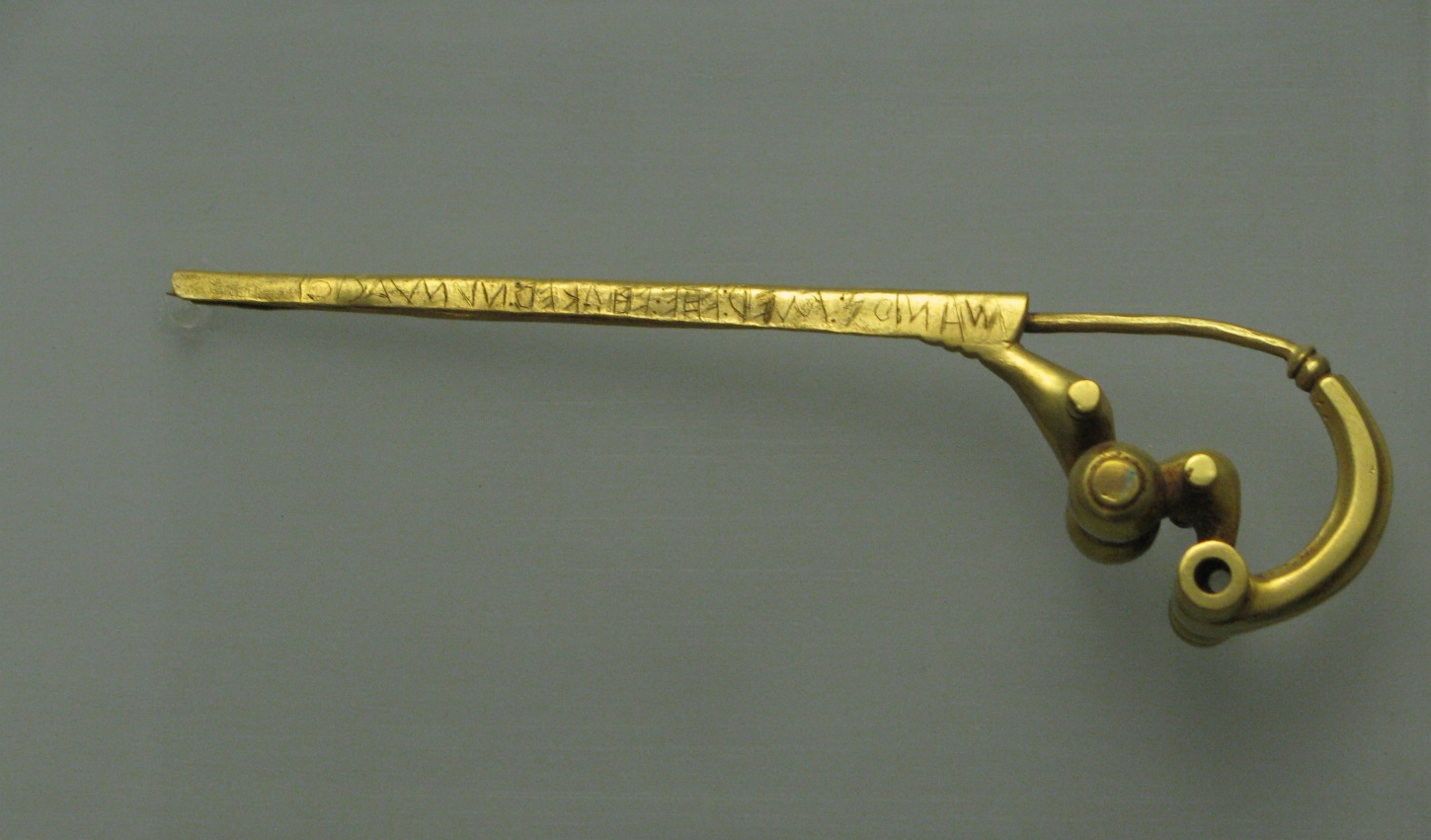
The Praeneste fibula is believed to bear the oldest known Latin inscription. The inscription means "Manius made me for Numerius".

The language of ancient Rome was Latin, a member of the Italic family of languages. The earliest surviving inscription in Latin comes from the 7th century BC, on a brooch from Palestrina. Latin from between this point and the early 1st century BC is known as Old Latin. Most surviving Latin literature is Classical Latin, from the 1st century BC to the 2nd century AD. Latin then evolved into Late Latin, in use during the late antique period. Late Latin survived long after the end of classical antiquity, and was finally replaced by written Romance languages around the 9th century AD. Along with literary forms of Latin, there existed various vernacular dialects, generally known as Vulgar Latin, in use throughout antiquity. These are mainly preserved in sources such as graffiti and the Vindolanda tablets.

=== Literature ===
Latin literature seems to have started in 240 BC, when a Roman audience saw a play adapted from the Greek by Livius Andronicus. Andronicus also translated Homer's Odyssey into Saturnian verse. The poets Ennius, Accius, and Patruvius followed. Their work survives only in fragments; the earliest Latin authors whose work we have full examples of are the playwrights Plautus and Terence. Much of the best known and most highly thought of Latin literature comes from the classical period, with poets such as Virgil, Horace, and Ovid; historians such as Julius Caesar and Tacitus; orators such as Cicero; and philosophers such as Seneca the Younger and Lucretius. Late Latin authors include many Christian writers such as Lactantius, Tertullian and Ambrose; non-Christian authors, such as the historian Ammianus Marcellinus, are also preserved.

=== History ===
According to legend, the city of Rome was founded in 753 BC; in reality, there had been a settlement on the site since around 1000 BC, when the Palatine Hill was settled. The city was originally ruled by kings, first Roman, and then Etruscan – according to Roman tradition, the first Etruscan king of Rome, Tarquinius Priscus, ruled from 616 BC. Over the course of the 6th century BC, the city expanded its influence over the entirety of Latium. Around the end of the 6th century – traditionally in 510 BC – the kings of Rome were driven out, and the city became a republic.

Around 387 BC, Rome was sacked by the Gauls following the Battle of the Allia. It soon recovered from this humiliating defeat, however, and in 381 the inhabitants of Tusculum in Latium were made Roman citizens. This was the first time Roman citizenship was extended in this way. Rome went on to expand its area of influence, until by 269 the entirety of the Italian peninsula was under Roman rule. Soon afterwards, in 264, the First Punic War began; it lasted until 241. The Second Punic War began in 218, and by the end of that year, the Carthaginian general Hannibal had invaded Italy. The war saw Rome's worst defeat to that point at Cannae; the largest army Rome had yet put into the field was wiped out, and one of the two consuls leading it was killed. However, Rome continued to fight, annexing much of Spain and eventually defeating Carthage, ending her position as a major power and securing Roman preeminence in the Western Mediterranean.

== Legacy of the classical world ==
The classical languages of the ancient Mediterranean world influenced every European language, imparting to each a learned vocabulary of international application. Thus, Latin grew from a highly developed cultural product of the Golden and Silver eras of Latin literature to become the international lingua franca in matters diplomatic, scientific, philosophic and religious, until the 17th century. Long before this, Latin had evolved into the Romance languages and Ancient Greek into Modern Greek and its dialects. In the specialised science and technology vocabularies, the influence of Latin and Greek is notable. Ecclesiastical Latin, the Roman Catholic Church's official language, remains a living legacy of the classical world in the contemporary world.

Latin had an impact far beyond the classical world. It continued to be the pre-eminent language for serious writings in Europe long after the fall of the Roman Empire. The modern Romance languages (French, Italian, Portuguese, Romanian, Spanish, Galician, Catalan) all derive from Latin. Latin is still seen as a foundational aspect of European culture.

The legacy of the classical world is not confined to the influence of classical languages. The Roman Empire was taken as a model by later European empires, such as the Spanish, French and British empires. Classical art has been taken as a model in later periods – medieval Romanesque architecture and Enlightenment-era neoclassical literature were both influenced by classical models, to take but two examples, while James Joyce's Ulysses is one of the most influential works of twentieth-century literature.

== See also ==
- Classical tradition
- Great Books of the Western World
- Neoclassicism
- Outline of classical studies
- Outline of ancient Greece
- Outline of ancient Rome
