= Aulus Cremutius Cordus =

Early 1st century AD Roman historian

Aulus Cremutius Cordus (died 25 AD) was a Roman historian. There are very few remaining fragments of his work, principally covering the civil war and the reign of Augustus. In AD 25 he was forced by Sejanus, who was praetorian prefect under Tiberius, to kill himself after being accused of violating the lex maiestas.

== Life and death ==
Cordus was accused of treason by Satrius Secundus for having eulogized Brutus and spoken of Cassius as the last of the Romans. The Senate ordered the burning of his writings. Seneca the Younger, however, tells us that he most likely incurred Sejanus' displeasure for criticising him, because Sejanus had commissioned a statue of himself. We also know from this source—a letter to Cordus' daughter Marcia—that he starved himself to death. She was also instrumental in saving his work, so that it could be published again under Caligula. Apart from Seneca, he is mentioned by Tacitus, Quintilian, Suetonius and Dio Cassius. Even though Cordus committed suicide, his work survived.

The charge was, according to Tacitus, "a new charge for the first time heard" (novo ac tunc primum audito crimine). According to Mary R. McHugh, no one had been charged with maiestas (treason) for writing a history (editis annalibus). Tacitus wrote of him:

"Surely I am not making speeches to incite the people to civil war, as though Brutus and Cassius were armed and on the fields at Philippi? Or is it not the case that they, despite being dead for seventy years, exercise through literature a hold over a part of our memory, in the same way that they are known to us through their statues, which not even the victor abolished? Future generations give everyone their due honor; nor will there be lacking, even if I am condemned, people who will remember Cassius, Brutus – and even myself." Then he walked out of the Senate and starved himself to death. The Senate decreed that the aediles should burn his books. But they survived, hidden and then republished. For this reason one is more inclined to laugh at the foolishness of those who imagine that today’s regime can extinguish the subsequent generation’s memory.

A few years after Cordus's death, Seneca the Younger wrote Ad Marciam in order to console Marcia, Cordus's daughter, on the occasion of her son Metilius's death. Even though Ad Marciam is not primarily about Cordus, Seneca indicates that the works of Cordus had been re-published. Suetonius unequivocally asserts that the works of Cremutius Cordus were put back into circulation during the reign of Gaius [Caligula].

Marcia seemed to have been actively involved in the re-publication of her father's works. When Seneca wrote Ad Marciam he mentioned that Metilius had died three years previously and Marcia was unable to seek solace even from her "beloved literature". Therefore, her contribution to the publication of her father's work pre-dates the death of her son.

== Legacy ==
Vasily Rudich believes that "...the extent to which Seneca goes in his glorification of Cremutius Cordus is unbelievable." He also brings to attention the fact that "Seneca avoids any direct allusion to Cordus's alleged Republican sympathies, whatever their true character may have been."

According to Rebecca Langlands, Cordus's story "...is a tale which vividly demonstrates the possibility that a text might be received in a way which the author had not intended or anticipated, and be received in a way which might have dire consequences for author and text."

In his essay "Bookburning and Censorship in Ancient Rome", Frederick H. Cramer talks about the "...spineless schoolmaster Quintilian [who] grudgingly admitted that 'the bold utterances of Cremutius also have their admirers and deserve their fame, but he went on to assure readers that 'the passages that brought him to his ruin have been expurgated.'" Cramer also suggests that it was not unlikely for one of Quintilian's students to have been Tacitus, who later said:

The Fathers ordered his books to be burned...but some copies survived, hidden at the time, but afterwards published. Laughable, indeed, are the delusions of those who fancy that by their exercise of their ephemeral power, posterity can be defrauded of information. On the contrary, through persecution the reputation of the persecuted talents grows stronger. Foreign despots and all those who have used the same barbarous methods have only succeeded in bringing disgrace upon themselves and glory to their victims.

Cordus also appears in Ben Jonson's Sejanus: His Fall. According to Martin Butler, "Jonson gives Cordus an eloquent defence of the historian's objectivity, but we never learn what his ultimate fate is. History might redeem the past by preserving truth about it, but it is more likely that truth will be an early casualty of politics."
