= Albucius =

1st-century Roman physician

Albucius or Albutius was a physician of ancient Rome, who lived probably about the beginning or middle of the 1st century, and who is mentioned by Pliny as having gained by his practice the annual income of two hundred and fifty thousand sesterces. This is considered by Pliny to be a very large sum, and may therefore give us some notion of the fortunes made by physicians at Rome about the beginning of the empire.

== See also ==
- Albucia (gens)
