= Charles E. Bennett (scholar) =

American classical scholar (1858–1921)

- Born: Charles Edwin Bennett; 6 April 1858; Providence, Rhode Island, U.S.
- Died: 2 May 1921 (aged 63); Ithaca, New York
- Occupations: Classical scholar and the Goldwin Smith Professor

Academic background
- Education: Brown University; Harvard University

Academic work
- Institutions: Brown University; University of Wisconsin; Cornell University

Charles Edwin Bennett (6 April 1858 – 2 May 1921) was an American classical scholar and the Goldwin Smith Professor of Latin at Cornell University. He is best remembered for his book New Latin Grammar, first published in 1895 and still in print today.

== Life ==
Born in Providence, Rhode Island, Bennett graduated from Brown University in 1878 and also studied at Harvard (1881–1882) and in Germany (1882–1884). He taught in secondary schools in Florida (1878–1879), New York (1879–1881), and Nebraska (1885–1889), and became professor of Latin in the University of Wisconsin–Madison in 1889, of classical philology at Brown University in 1891, and of Latin at Cornell University in 1892. His syntactical studies, notably various papers on the subjunctive, are based on a statistical examination of Latin texts and are marked by a fresh system of nomenclature; he ranks as one of the leaders of the New American School of syntacticians, who insist on a preliminary re-examination of all available data.

Of great importance are his advocacy of quantitative reading of Latin verse and his Critique of Some Recent Subjunctive Theories in vol. ix. (1898) of Cornell Studies in Classical Philology, of which he was an editor. Bennett's Latin Grammar (1895) is the first successful attempt in America to adopt the method of the brief, scholarly Schulgrammatik. Besides the Latin classics commonly read in secondary courses and other text-books in Bennett's Latin Series, he edited Tacitus's Dialogus de Oratoribus (1894), and Cicero's De Senectute (1897) and De Amicitia (1897). He wrote The Teaching of Greek and Latin in Secondary Schools (1900), with George P. Bristol, and The Latin language, a historical outline of its sounds inflections, and syntax (1907), with William Alexander Hammond, and translated The Characters of Theophrastus (1902), and the Loeb Classical Library edition of the Odes and Epodes of Horace (1914).

He was president of the American Philological Association in 1907. He was elected to the American Philosophical Society in 1913.

== Other publications ==
- Appendix to Bennett's Latin Grammar for Teachers and Advanced Students (1895)
- Foundations of Latin (1898) ISBN 978-1-104-15979-5
- Latin Lessons (1901)
- Caesar's Gallic War (1903)
- Cicero's Selected Orations (1904)
- Virgil's Aeneid (1904)
- Preparatory Latin Writer (1905)
- Syntax of Early Latin, 2 vols. (1910, 1914)
- New Latin Composition (1912)
- New Latin Grammar (1918)
- New Cicero (1922)
