= Praeneste fibula =

7th-century BC Old Latin inscription

The brooch of Palestrina
- Latin: Fibula Praenestina
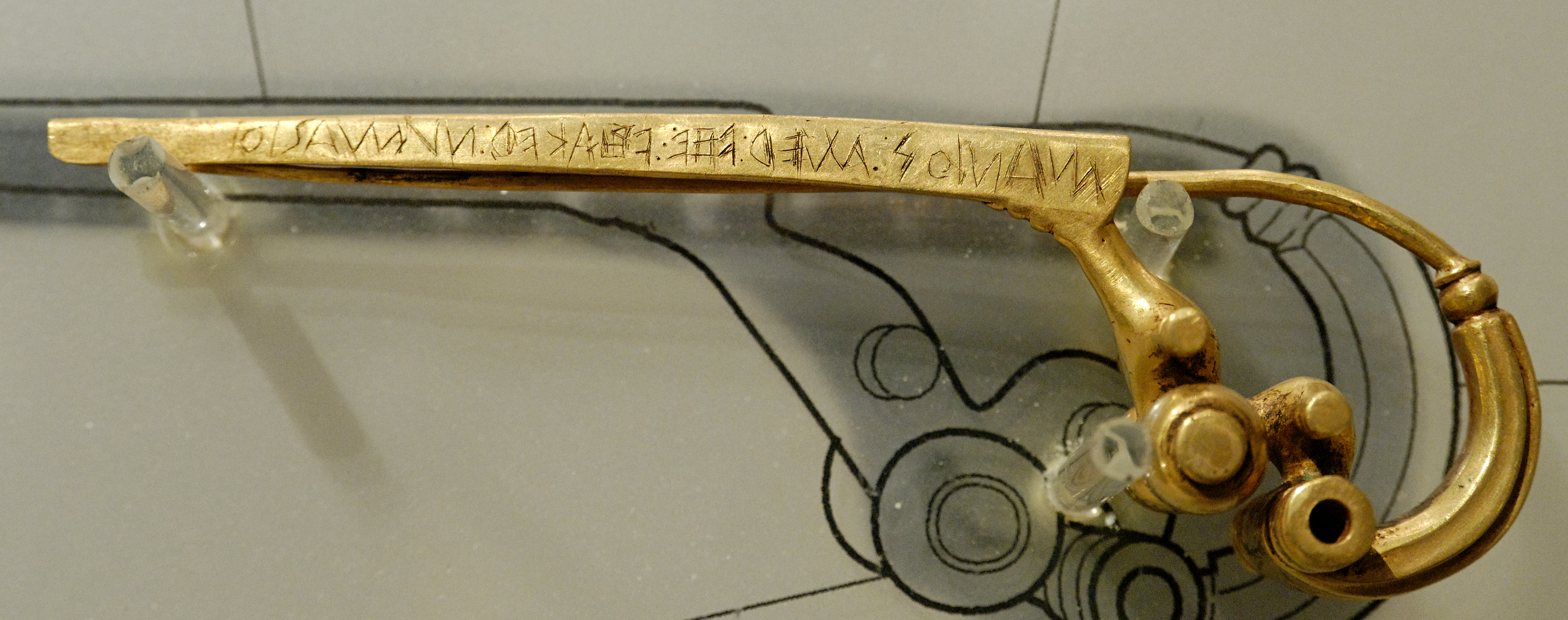
- Material: Gold
- Size: 10.7 cm (4 1/5 in) long
- Writing: Old Latin: ꟿANIOS ꟿED FHEFHAKED NVꟿASIOI
- Created: 7th century BC
- Discovered: 1870s–1880s Location disputed, alleged to be the Bernardini tomb, Palestrina, Italy
- Discovered by: Unknown, announced by Wolfgang Helbig in 1887
- Present location: Pigorini National Museum of Prehistory and Ethnography, Rome, Italy
- Culture: Etruscan civilization, orientalizing period

The Praeneste fibula (the "brooch of Palestrina") is a golden fibula or brooch, today housed in the Pigorini National Museum of Prehistory and Ethnography in Rome. The fibula bears an inscription in Old Latin, claiming craftsmanship by one Manios and ownership by one Numazios. At the time of its discovery in the late nineteenth century, it was accepted as the earliest known specimen of the Latin language. The authenticity of the inscription has since been disputed, repeatedly rejected and affirmed, with one assertion of antiquity dating to the first half of the seventh century BC.

== Discovery ==
The fibula was presented to the public in 1887 by Wolfgang Helbig, an archaeologist. According to some sources, Helbig did not explain how he had come to acquire the artifact at the time, although others state that the fibula "was first made known to the public in three short articles in the Römische Mitteilungen for 1887 where it is said to have been purchased in Palestrina by a friend of Helbig in the year 1871, or five years before the discovery of the tomb" – the tomb in question being the Bernardini Tomb whose treasure the fibula was later claimed to be a part of.

== Date and inscription ==
The fibula was thought to originate from the seventh century BC. It is inscribed with a text that appears to be written in Old Latin or even Proto-Latino-Faliscan, here transcribed to Roman letters:

MANIOS MED FHE FHAKED NVMASIOI

The reconstructed Proto-Italic ancestor would have been:

*(PN) mēd fefake^{d} (PN)

In Classical Latin the inscription reads:

*Manius me fecit Numerio,

"Manius made me for Numerius."

== Authenticity ==
In 1980 Margherita Guarducci, a leading epigraphist, published a book arguing that the inscription had been forged by Francesco Martinetti, an art dealer, and Helbig, who were known to have collaborated in shady dealings. Guarducci argued that the fibula's presentation in 1887 was a hoax perpetrated to advance the careers of both men. This was the most formal but not the first accusation of its kind: Georg Karo had said that Helbig told him that the fibula had been stolen from Palestrina's Tomba Bernardini.

Thomas Hoving tells the story in a way that necessitates the item's falseness. His personal detective work involved becoming convinced it had been written in mirror image rather than an originally reversed hand. Putting it to a mirror, he saw "a near-English word, fhaked," but thought anyone who'd seen faked in it – a forger's admission – put it out of their minds that anyone "could be so bold." In addition to the boldness, there was evidence in court by expert testimony.

Evidence in favor of the genuineness of the text came from a new Etruscan inscription of the Orientalizing period published by Massimo Poetto and Giulio Facchetti in 1999. The inscription scratched on the body of an Etrusco-Corinthian aryballos shows a gentilicium, Numasiana, which provides confirmation of the genuineness of the name Numasioi on the Fibula Prenestina, often regarded as suspicious by the supporters of the theory that it was a forgery.

In 2005, based on epigraphic and other arguments, linguist Markus Hartmann concluded that it is justified to assume the authenticity of the inscription as long as there is no compelling evidence for a forgery, and dated it with confidence to the seventh century BC.

In 2011, new scientific evidence was presented by the research team of Edilberto Formigli and Daniela Ferro, whose optical, physical and chemical analyses allowed them to take into consideration smaller scrapes on the surface of the object than was possible in the 1980s. Observation by means of scanning electron microscope (SEM) and detailed physical and chemical analyses on the surface of small areas within the track of the incision showed the existence of micro-crystallization of the gold surface: a natural phenomenon that could have taken place only in the course of centuries after the fusion. The study reported that a 19th-century forger could not have realized such a forgery.

== Replicas ==
Replicas of the fibula are held by the National Roman Museum's Museum of Epigraphy at the Baths of Diocletian in Rome, and also by the Arthur M. Sackler Museum at Harvard in Cambridge, Massachusetts.

== See also ==
- Duenos inscription
- Lapis Niger
- Ficoroni Cista

== Bibliography ==
- Hoving, Thomas (1996). False Impressions. New York: Simon & Schuster. ISBN 0-684-81134-0.
