= Albucilla =

1st-century Roman noblewoman

Albucilla (1st-century) was a Roman noblewoman, the wife of Satrius Secundus, and was known for having had many lovers.

In the last year of the reign of the emperor Tiberius, 37 AD, she was accused of treason, or impiety, against the emperor (Latin: impietas in principem) along with Gnaeus Domitius Ahenobarbus, Vibius Marsus, and Lucius Arruntius, and imprisoned by command of the Roman Senate after attempting suicide.

== See also ==
- Albucia gens
