= Titus Albucius =

Roman statesman

Titus Albucius (praetor c. 105 BC) was a noted orator of the late Roman Republic.

== Education ==
Albucius finished his studies at Athens at the end of the 2nd century BC, and belonged to the Epicurean sect. He was well acquainted with Greek literature, or rather, says Cicero, was almost a Greek. On account of his affecting on every occasion the Greek language and philosophy, he was satirized by Lucilius, whose lines upon him are preserved by Cicero, and Cicero himself speaks of him as a light-minded man. He unsuccessfully accused Mucius Scaevola, the augur, of maladministration (repetundae) in his province.

== Career ==
In 105 BC, Albucius was praetor in Sardinia, and in consequence of some insignificant success which he had gained over some robbers, he celebrated a triumph in the province. On his return to Rome, he applied to the Senate for the honour of a supplicatio, but this was refused, and he was accused in 103 BC of repetundae by Gaius Julius Caesar (the elder), and condemned. Pompeius Strabo had offered himself as the accuser, but he was not allowed to conduct the prosecution, because he had been the quaestor of Albucius. After his condemnation, he went into exile at Athens and pursued the study of philosophy. He left behind him some orations, which had been read by Cicero.

== See also ==
- Albucia (gens)
- Lucilius
- Cicero
