= Satrius Secundus =

Supporter of the Roman Praetorian Guard Prefect, Lucius Aelius Sejanus

Satrius Secundus was a dependant of Sejanus in the 1st century Roman Empire. He accused Aulus Cremutius Cordus in 25 AD. He afterwards betrayed his master and gave information to Tiberius of the conspiracy which Sejanus had formed against him. Josephus relates that Antonia informed Tiberius of the conspiracy of Sejanus. It has been conjectured that Secundus, unwilling or unable to have an interview with the emperor, had acquainted Antonia with the plot.

Secundus was married to the notorious Albucilla.
