= Hittite rock reliefs =

Extant Hittite rock reliefs in Turkey

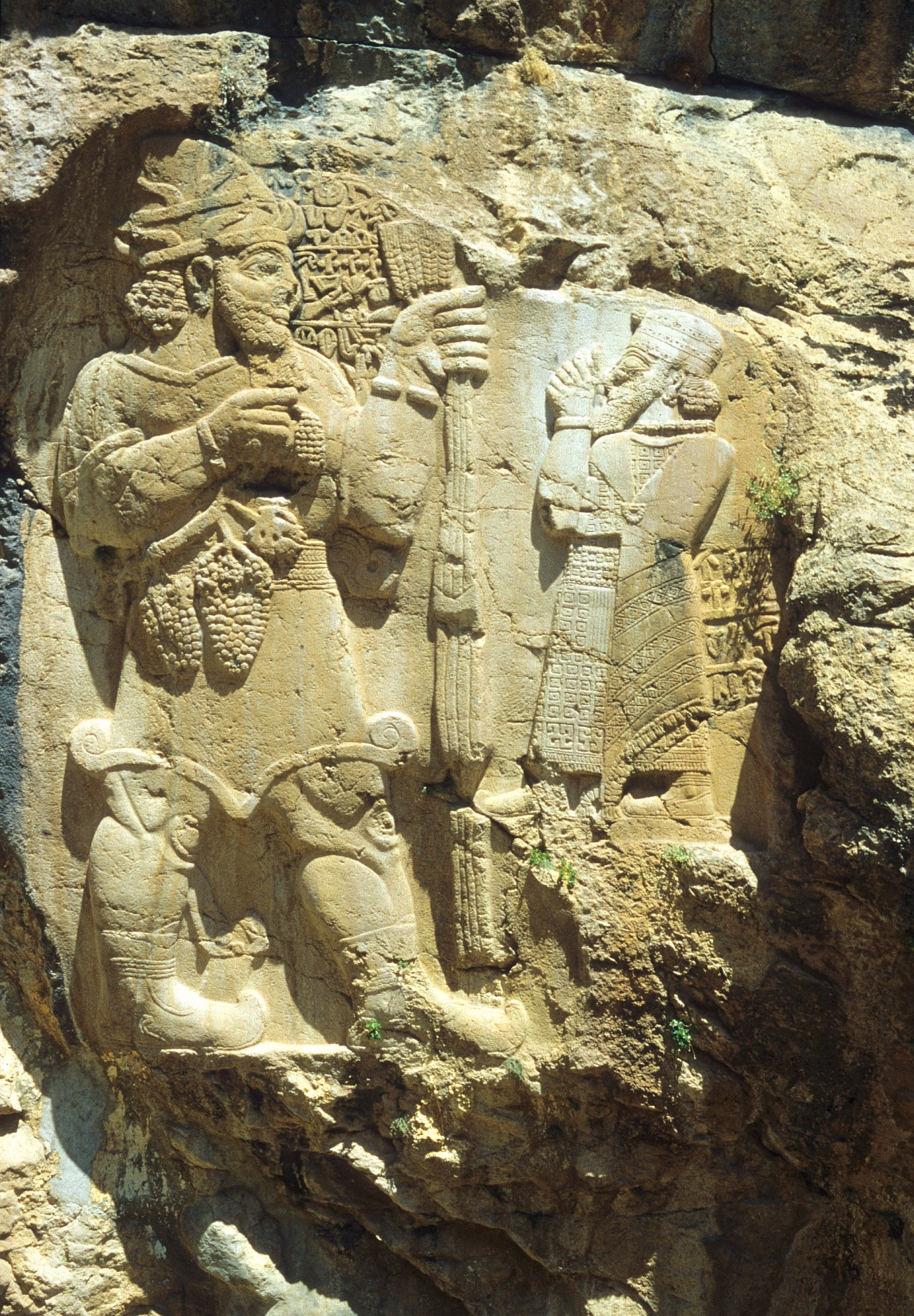
The İvriz relief (8th century BC), photographed 2001

Rock reliefs form a large part of the extant artistic remains of the Anatolian Hittite Empire (c. 14th century BC). The reliefs that survive are often located near roads, and in mountainous terrain (over 1000 meters elevation) overlooking plains. They are often near sites with sacred significance both before and after the Hittite period, such as sacred springs, "linking the [Hittite] state's official discourse with the divine beings of [those] places" (Harmanşah, 2014).

At Yazılıkaya, just outside the capital of Hattusa, a series of reliefs of Hittite gods in procession decorate open-air "chambers" made by adding barriers among the natural rock formations. The site was apparently a sanctuary, and possibly a burial site, for the commemoration of the ruling dynasty's ancestors.

== Ancient references ==
Herodotus, in the Histories (written c. 430 BC), describes the Karabel relief, which he attributes to the legendary Egyptian pharaoh Sesostris:

Also, there are in Ionia two figures of this man [i.e., Sesostris] carved in rock, one on the road from Ephesus to Phocaea, and the other on that from Sardis to Smyrna. In both places, the figure is over twenty feet high, with a spear in his right hand and a bow in his left, and the rest of his equipment proportional; for it is both Egyptian and Ethiopian; and right across the breast from one shoulder to the other a text is cut in the Egyptian sacred characters, saying: “I myself won this land with the strength of my shoulders.” There is nothing here to show who he is and whence he comes, but it is shown elsewhere. Some of those who have seen these figures guess they are Memnon, but they are far indeed from the truth.

== List of reliefs from the Hittite Empire Period (1600-1200 B.C) ==
- Fıraktın relief
- Hanyeri relief
- Hemite relief
- İmamkullu relief
- Karabel relief
- Manisa relief
- Taşçı reliefs

== List of reliefs from the Neo-Hittite Period (1200-700 B.C) ==
- Gökbez relief
- İvriz relief
- Karasu relief

== Gallery ==
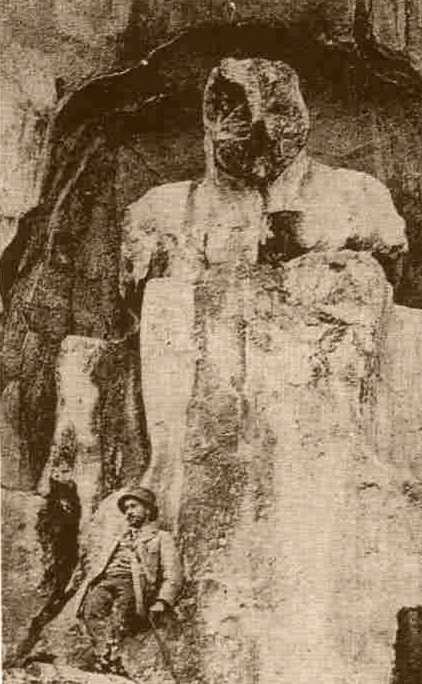
The Manisa relief (14th? century BC), photographed c. 1900

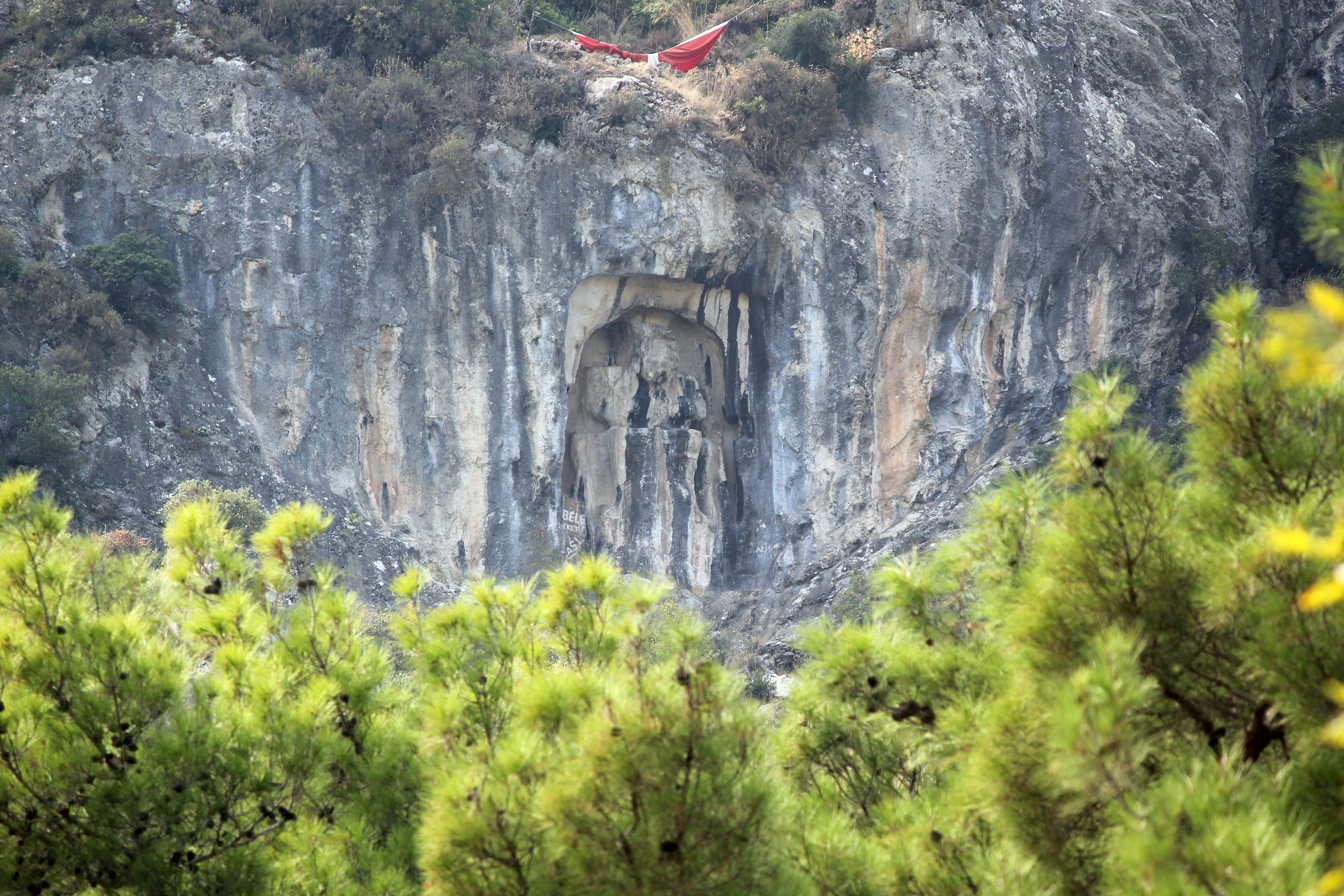
The Manisa relief, photographed 2010

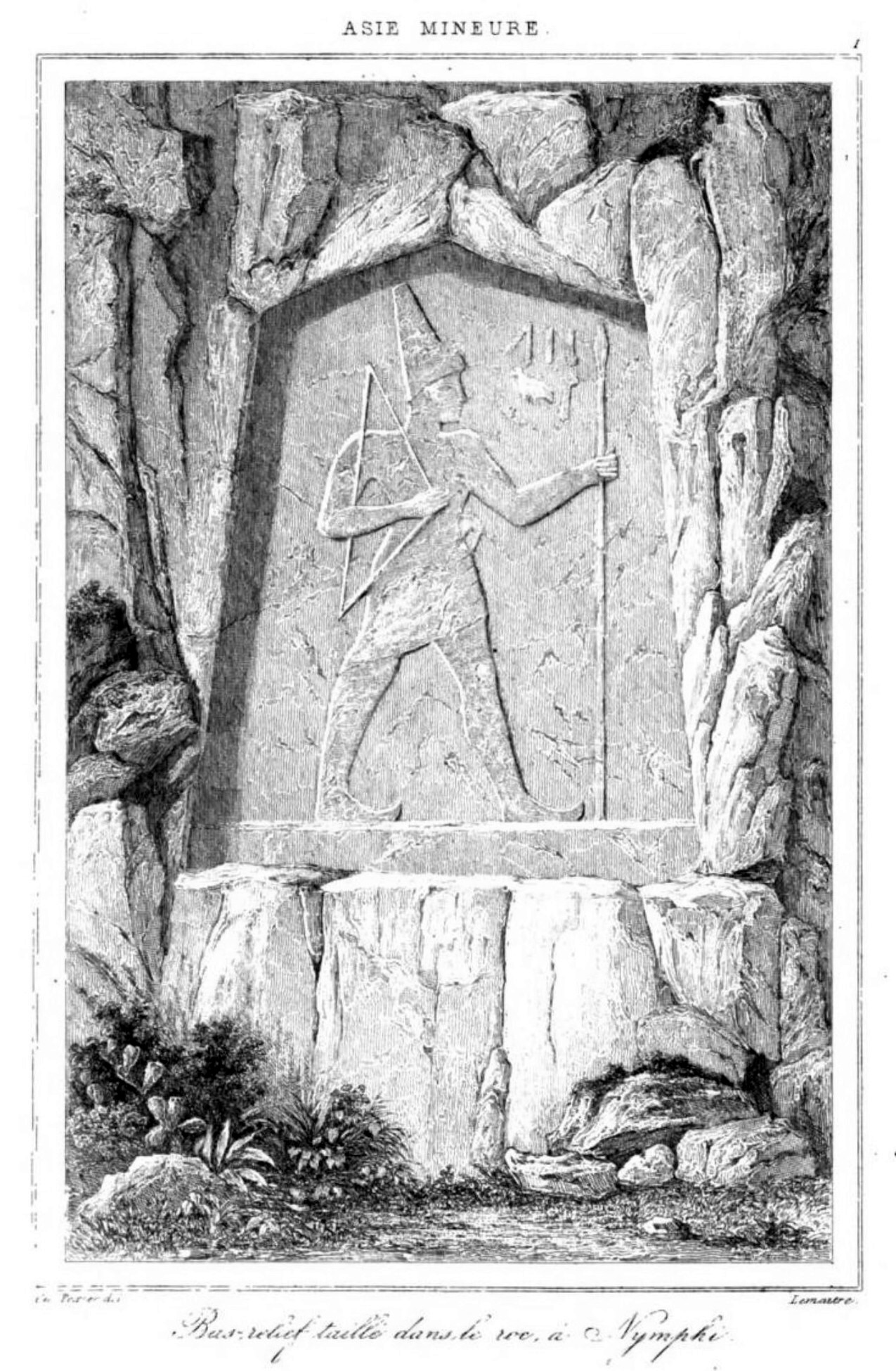
The Karabel relief (13th century BC), as drawn by Charles Texier, c. 1840

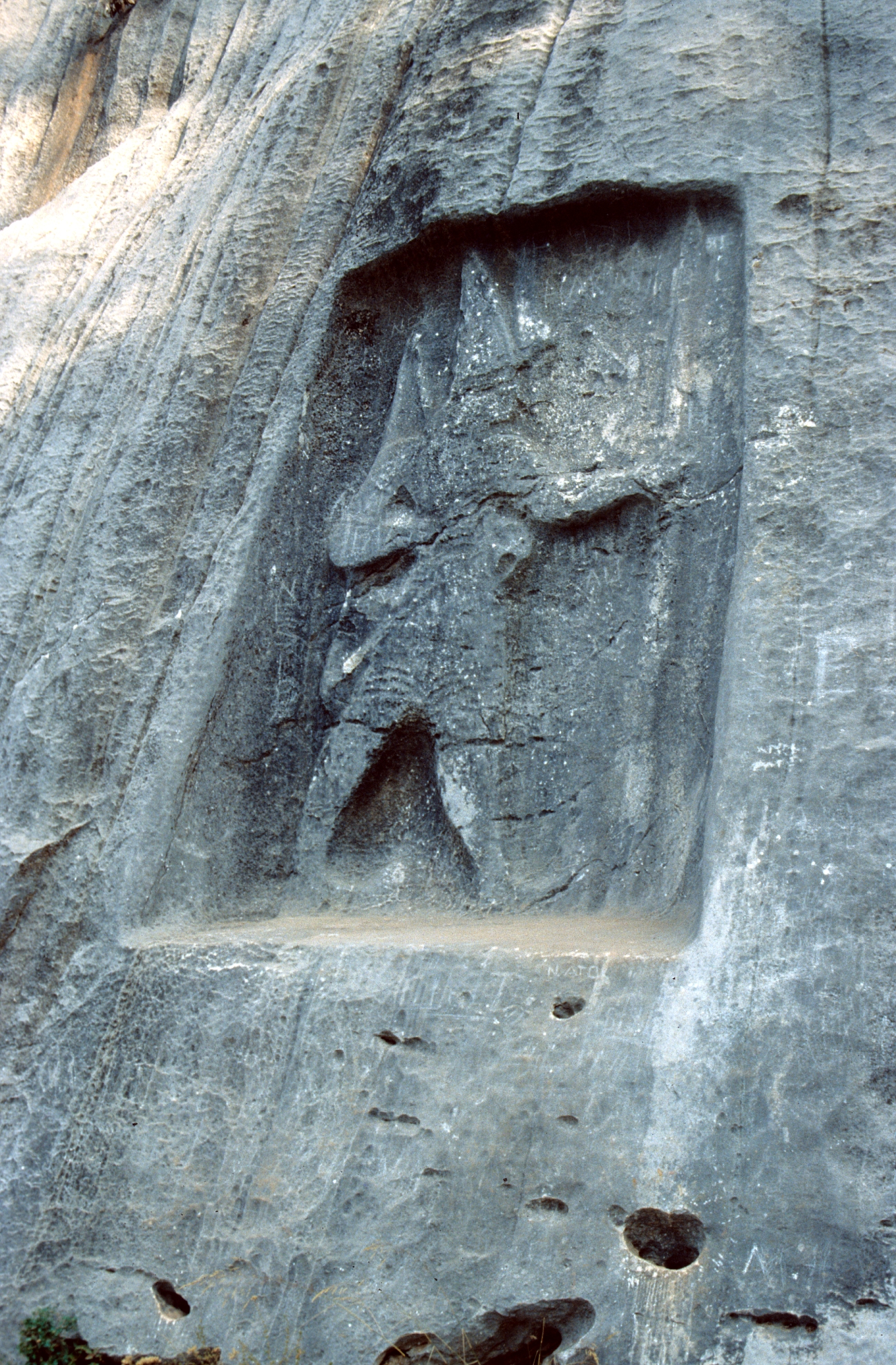
The Karabel relief, photographed 1991

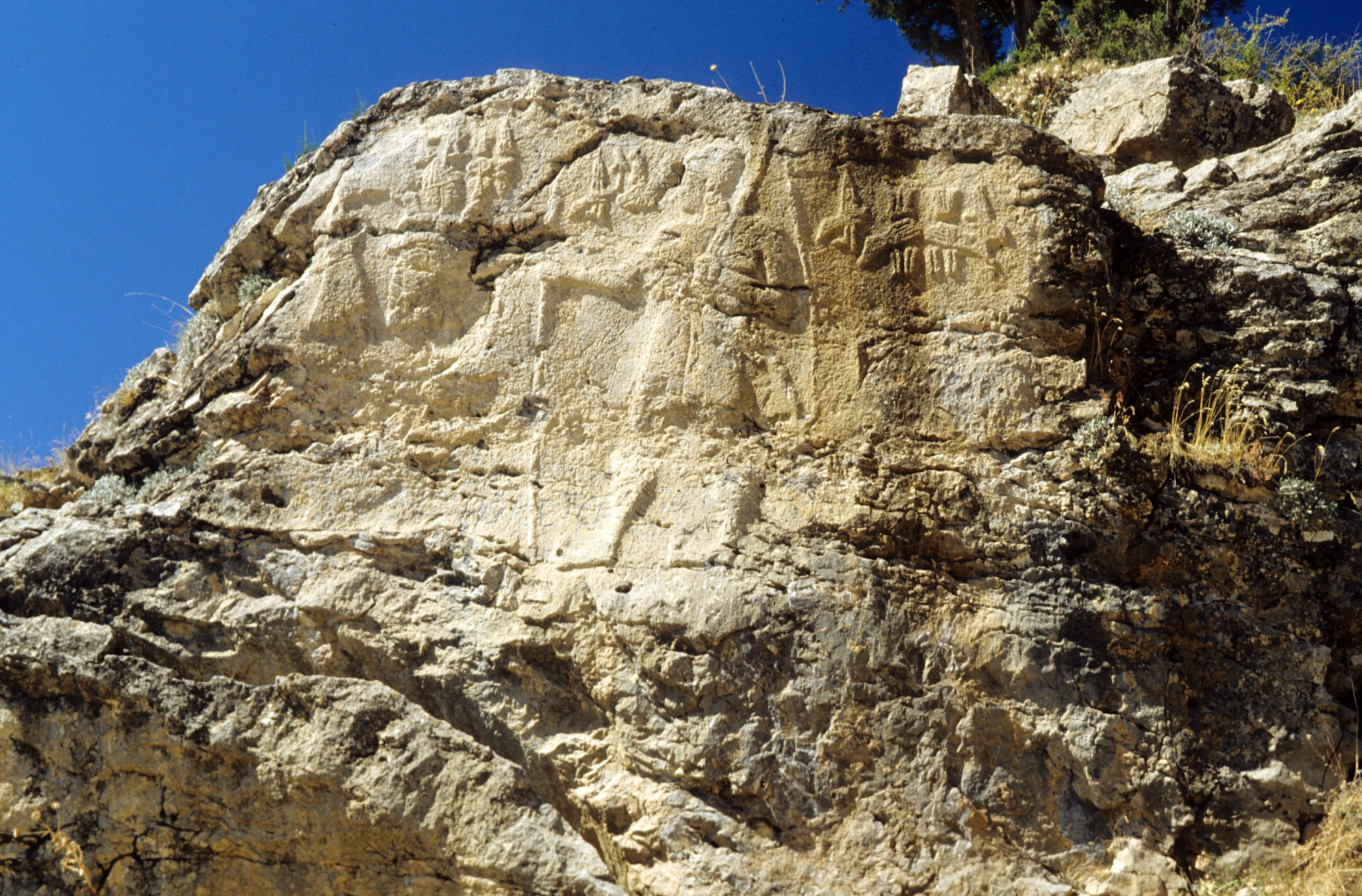
The Hanyeri relief (13th century BC), photographed 1995

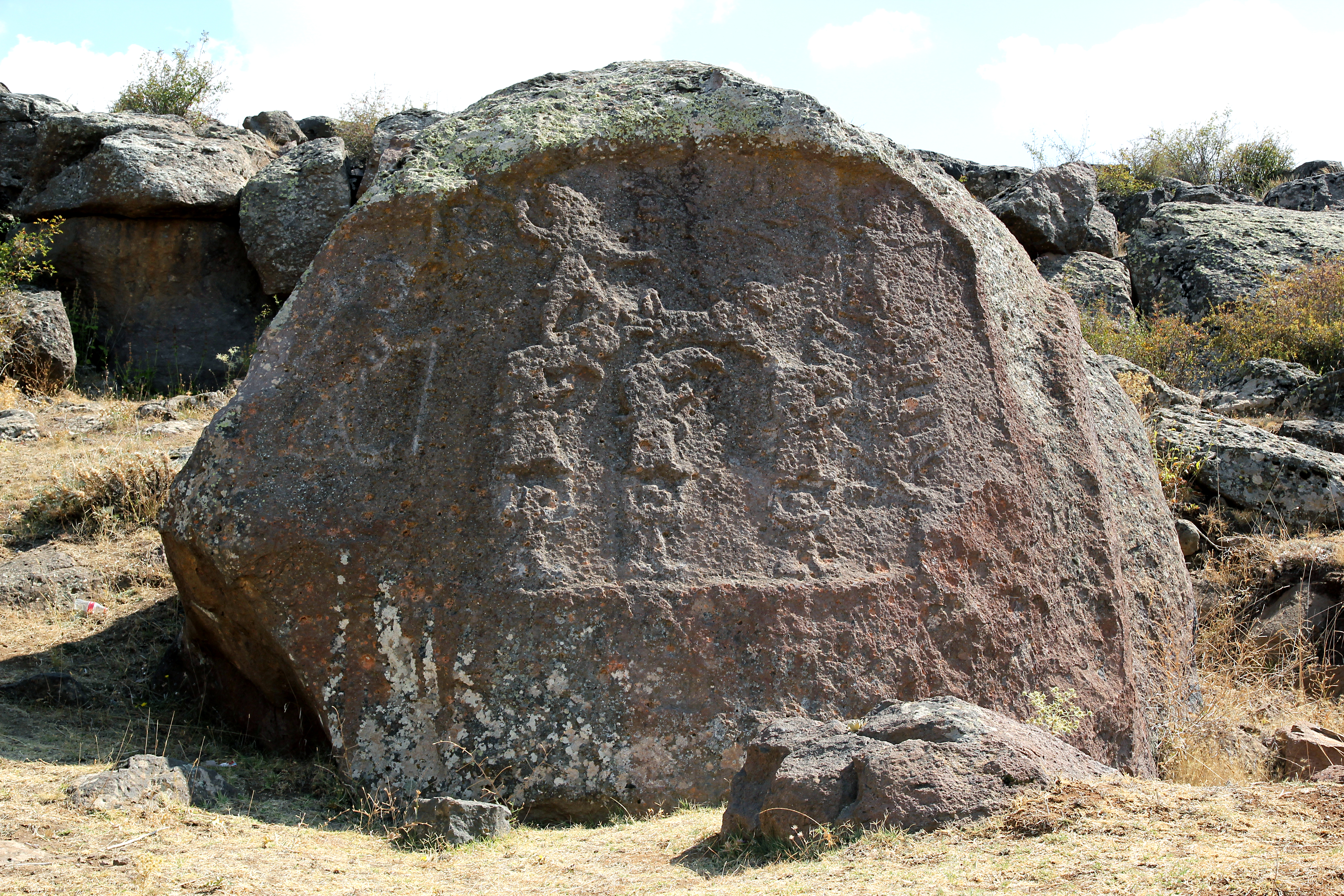
The İmamkullu relief (13th century BC), photographed 2012

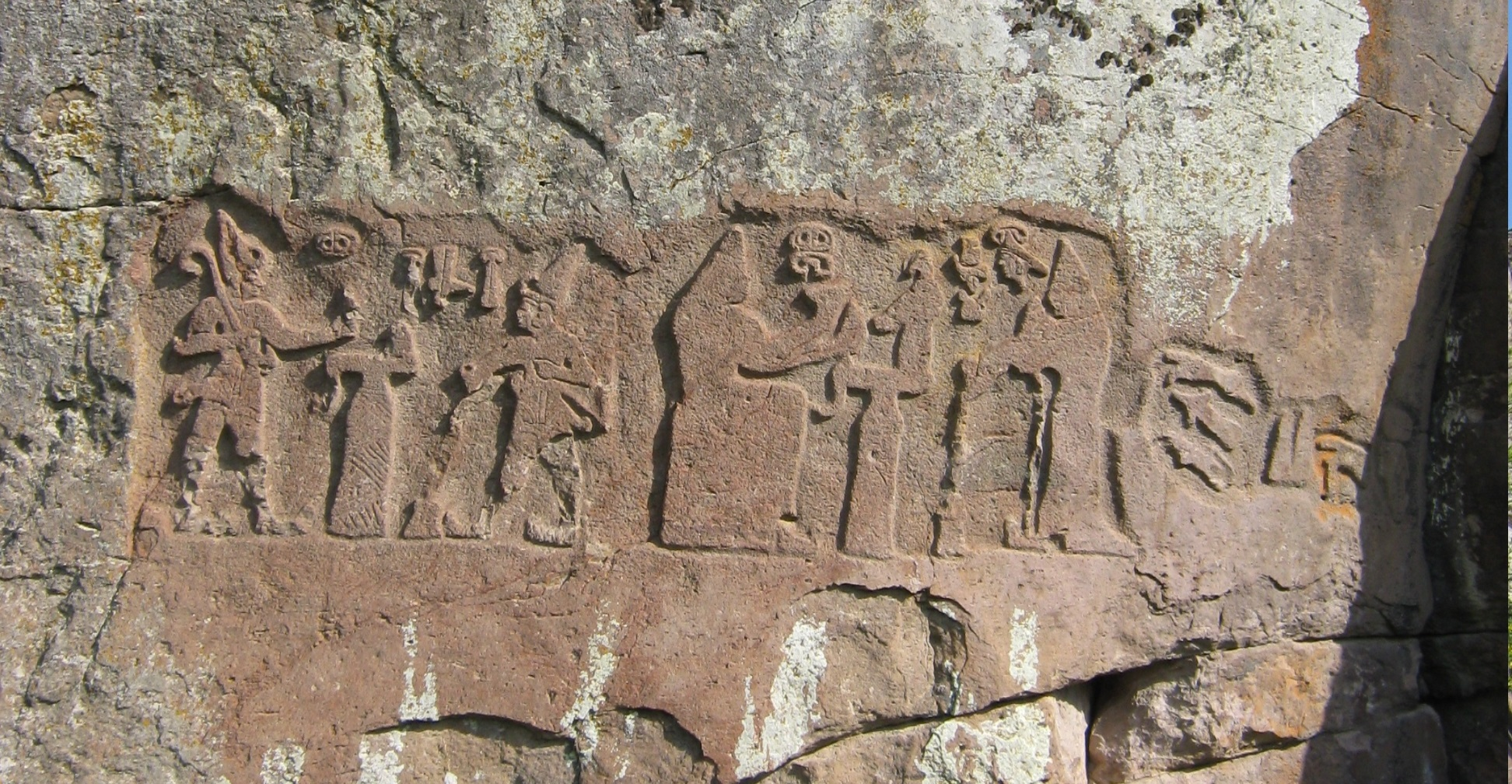
The Fıraktın relief (13th century BC), photographed 2013

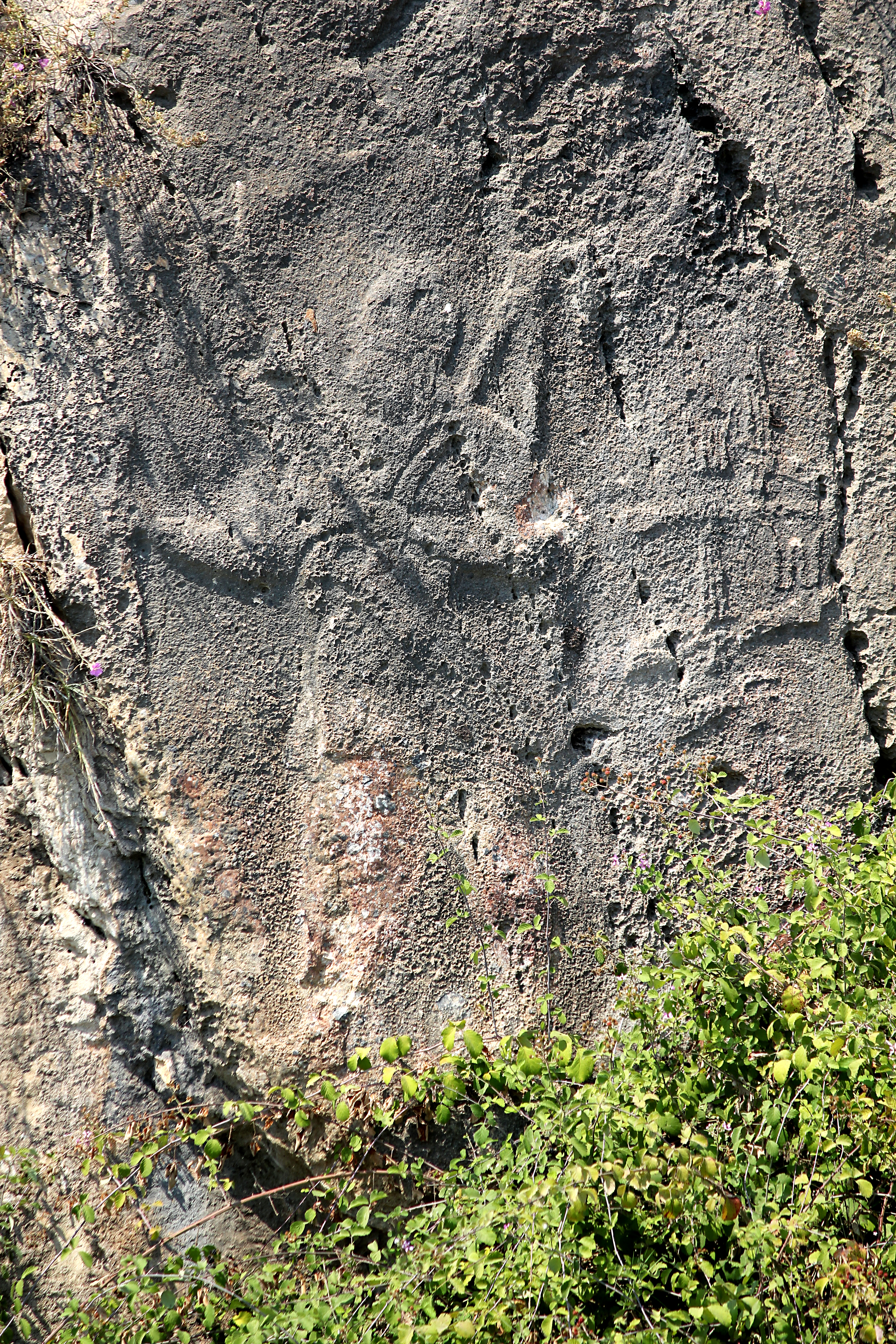
The Hemite relief (13th? century BC), photographed 2011

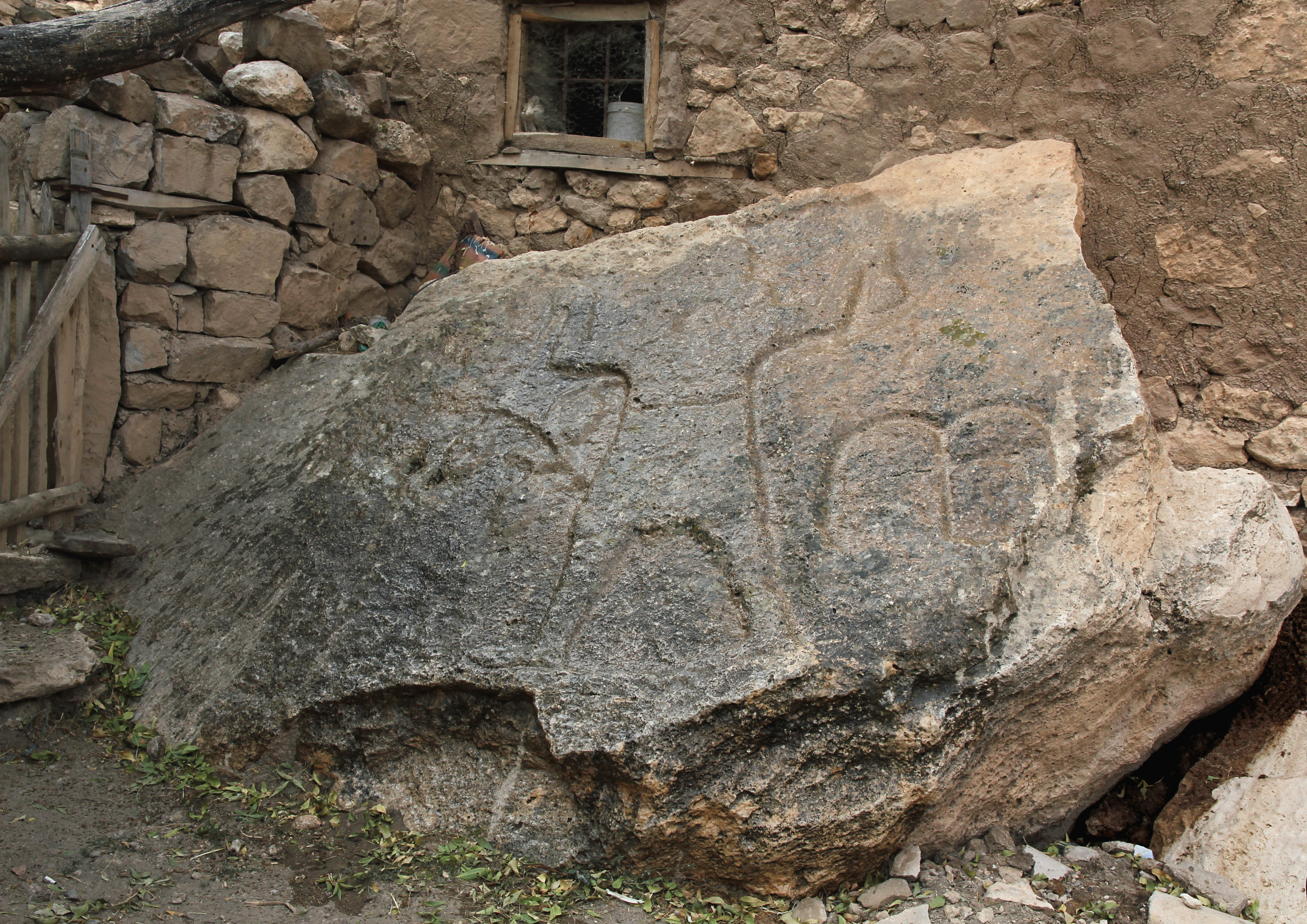
The Gökbez relief (8th–7th century BC), photographed 2013

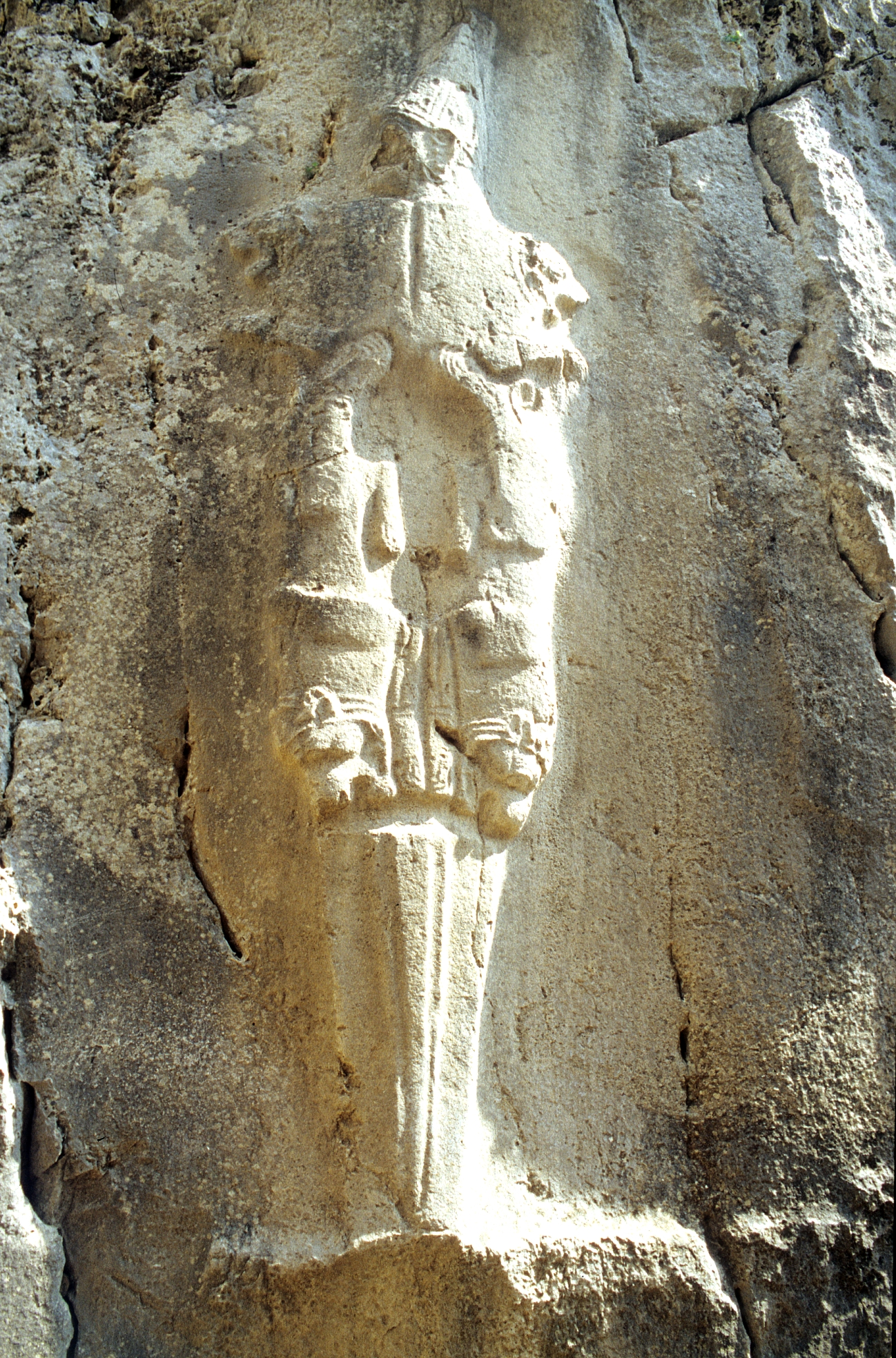
Nergal, depicted at Yazılıkaya, photographed 2002

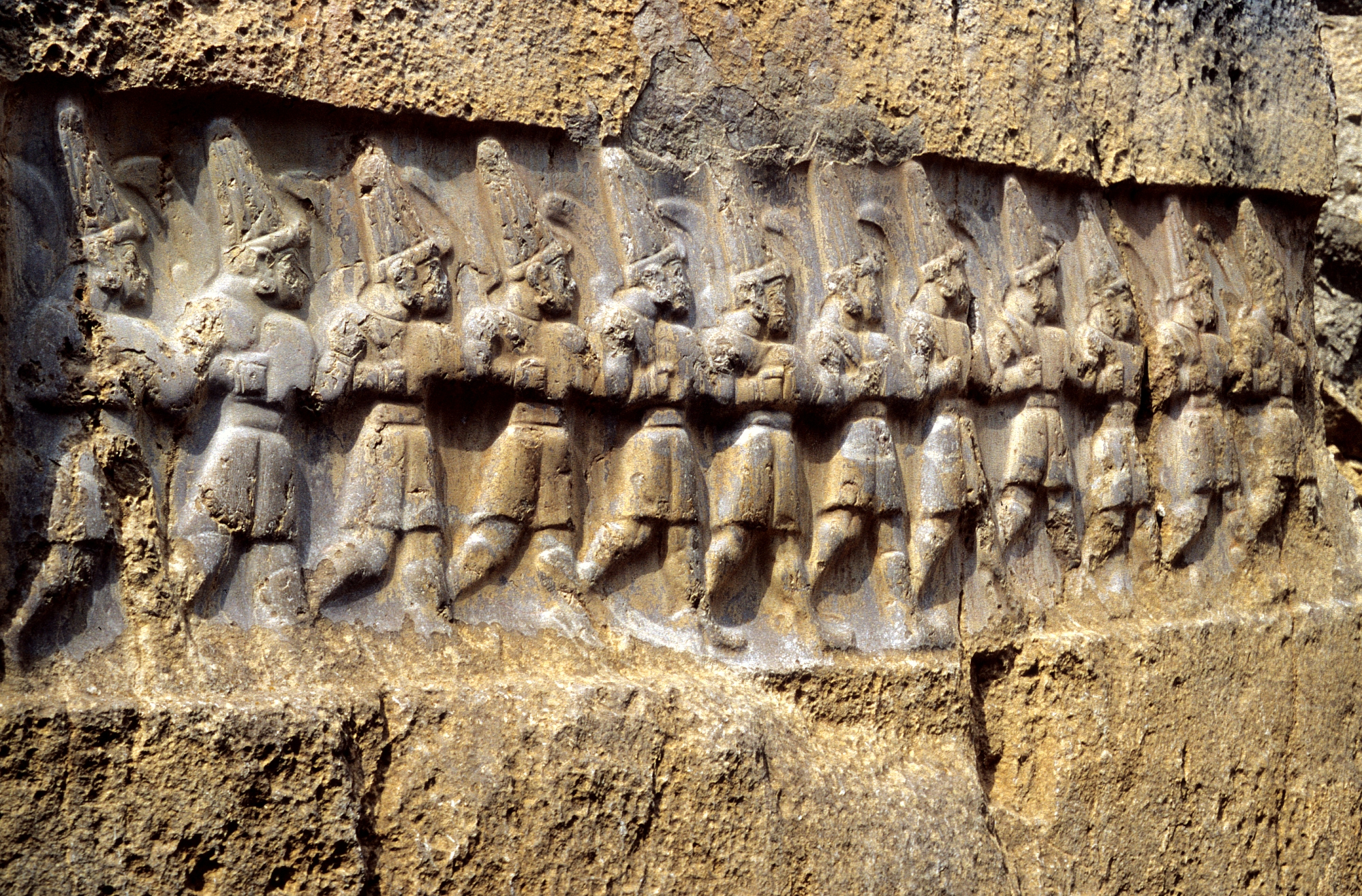
The twelve gods of the underworld, depicted at Yazılıkaya
