= Hittite art =

Hittite art

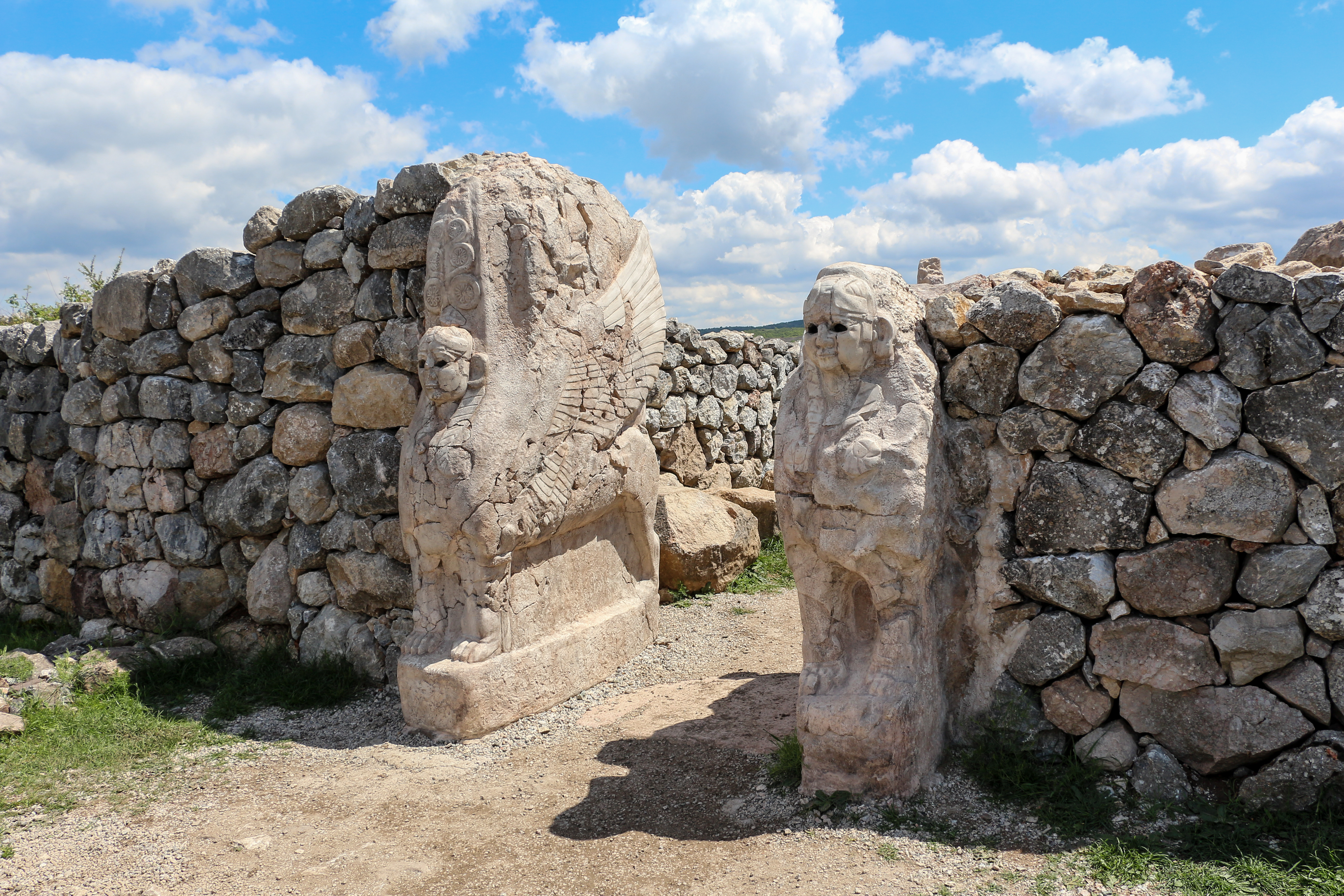
The Sphinx Gate (Alaca Höyük, Turkey)

Hittite art was produced by the Hittite civilization in ancient Anatolia, in modern-day Turkey, and also stretching into Syria during the second millennium BCE from the nineteenth century up until the twelfth century BCE. This period falls under the Anatolian Bronze Age. It is characterized by a long tradition of canonized images and motifs rearranged, while still being recognizable, by artists to convey meaning to a largely illiterate population.

“Owing to the limited vocabulary of figural types [and motifs], invention for the Hittite artist usually was a matter of combining and manipulating the units to form more complex compositions"

Many of these recurring images revolve around the depiction of Hittite deities and ritual practices. There is also a prevalence of hunting scenes in Hittite relief and representational animal forms. Much of the art comes from settlements like Alaca Höyük, or the Hittite capital of Hattusa near modern-day Boğazkale. Scholars have difficulty dating a large portion of Hittite art, citing the fact that there is a lack of inscription and much of the found material, especially from burial sites, was moved from its original locations and distributed among museums during the nineteenth century. However, larger period groupings have been established by some, including the Colony Age, the Hittite Old Kingdom era, the Hittite New Kingdom era, and the period of Post-Hittite states.

== The Colony Age ==
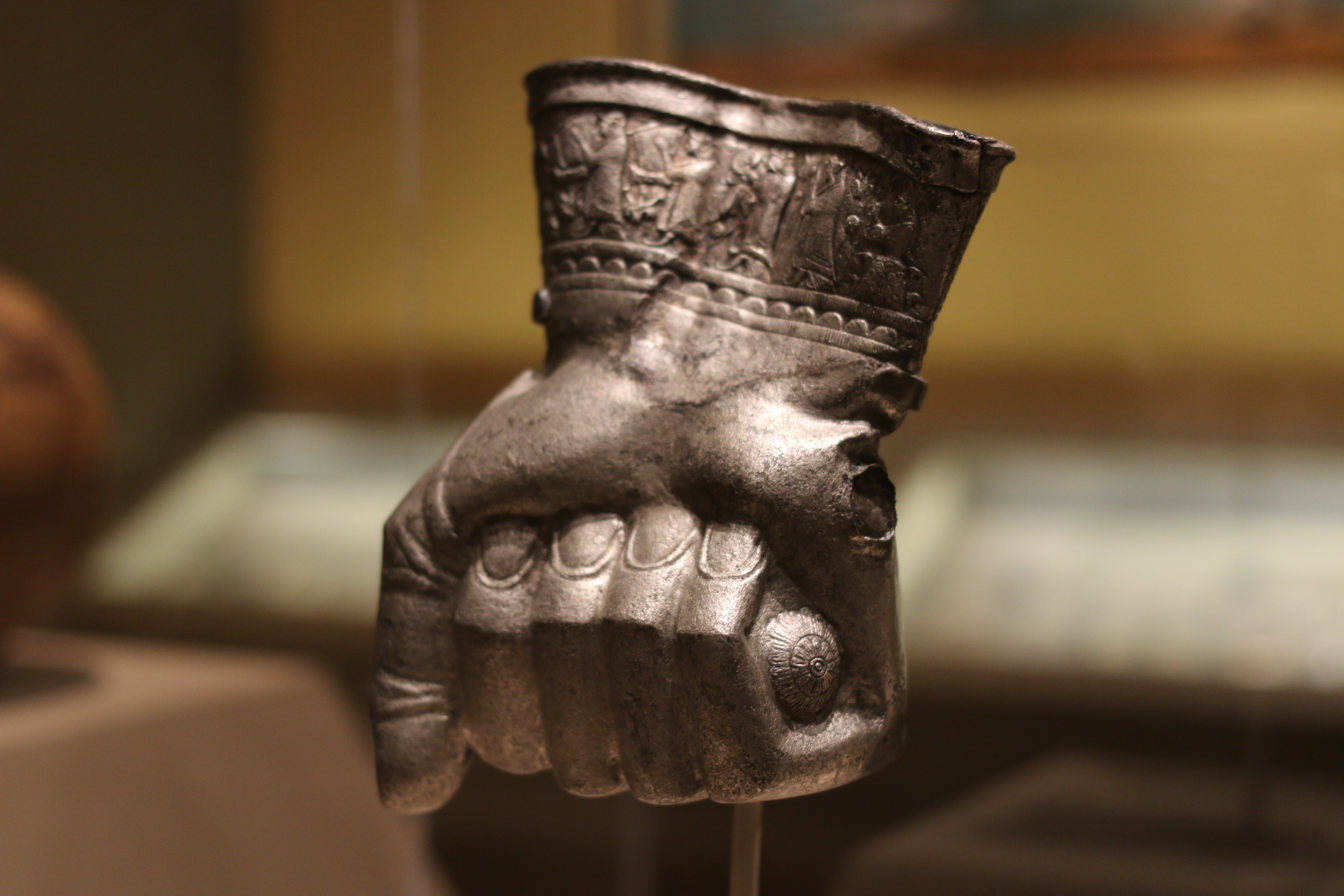
Drinking cup in the shape of a fist; 1400-1380 BC; silver; from Central Turkey; Museum of Fine Arts (Boston, USA)

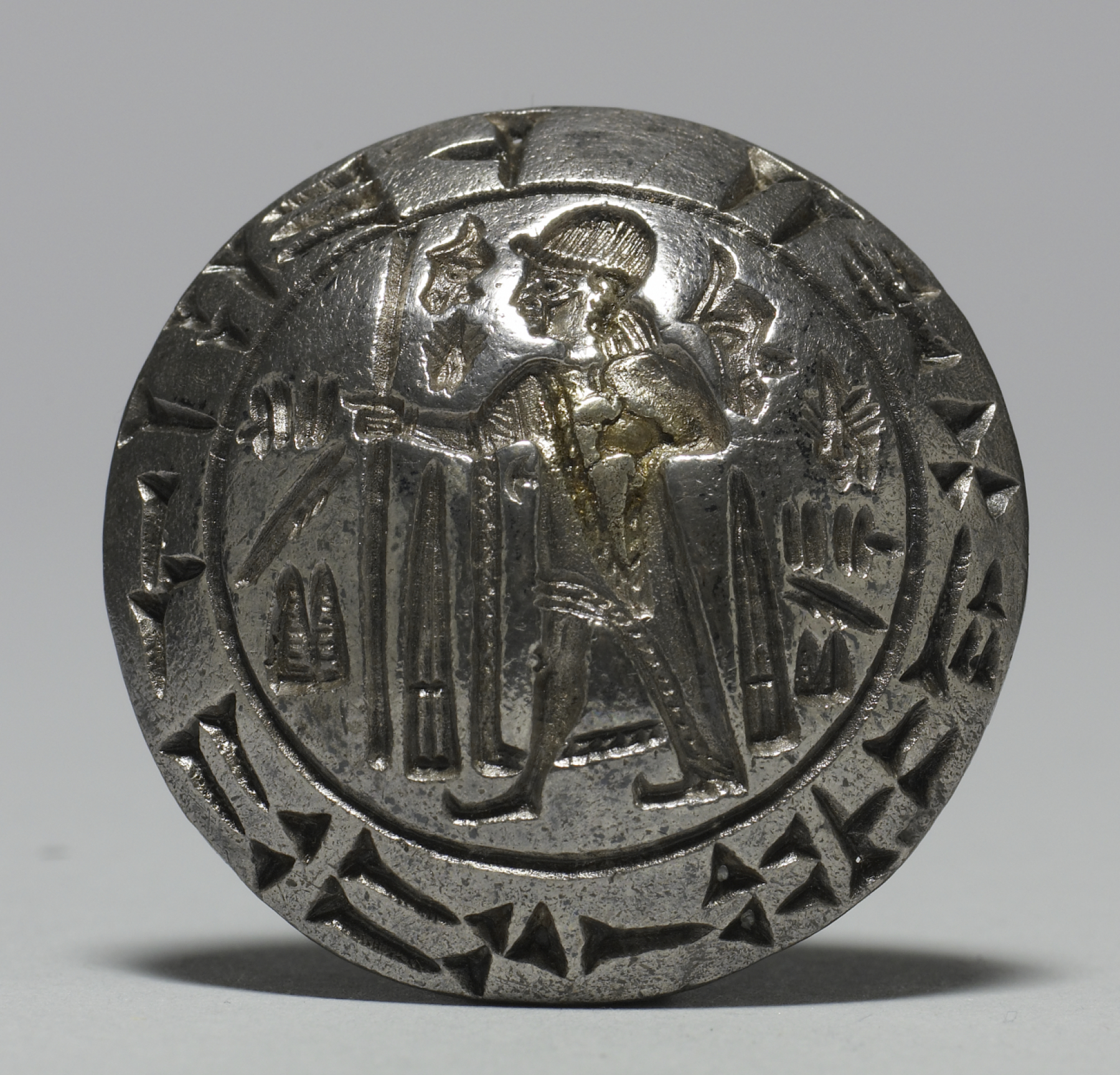
Seal of Tarkasnawa, King of Mira; circa 1220 BC; silver; height: 1 cm, diameter: 4.2 cm; Walters Art Museum (Baltimore, USA)

Historians refer to the period around the nineteenth and eighteenth centuries B.C.E. as the Colony Age, before a larger Hittite Kingdom was established in the region. Groups in settlements of this period included Hattians, Hurrians, and Assyrians living in trading colonies, which the Hittites took control of when they moved into the area. The art style of this time involved assimilation of previous Anatolian symbols and sensibilities. Before this period and during the third millennium, art in ancient Anatolia consisted of rather flat representations of human figures found at burial sites. This was emulated in Hittite ivories like one of a young girl, half seated, cupping her breasts, and wearing a traditional cap.

Most of the objects available from the second millennium come in the mediums of carved ivories, baked clay, and small seals. A group of ivories from Acemhöyük, now housed in the Metropolitan Museum of Art of New York, includes a small sphinx with long curls of hair over its chest that art historians refer to as Hathor curls. As for seals, while there were more traditional cylinder seals, the composition of these Hittite stamp seals did not include a ground-line, and thus the figures are free floating. Deities have been identified such as weather gods who stand on bulls or mountains. This image is repeated in later Imperial rock reliefs. Hittite people of the Colony Age took on and incorporated the motifs from the previous civilizations they asserted control over, mimicking indigenous art styles, including in the depiction of animals such as deer, lions, bulls, and raptors like eagles. A common piece is animal-shaped rhytons, or drinking vessels, which could be sculpted out of clay or later metalwork. The raptors in particular are exceptionally well-shaped. The Hüseyindede vases are examples of a type of elaborate pottery vase with animal figures and other decoration in relief; other pieces in this style have been found.

== Old Kingdom ==
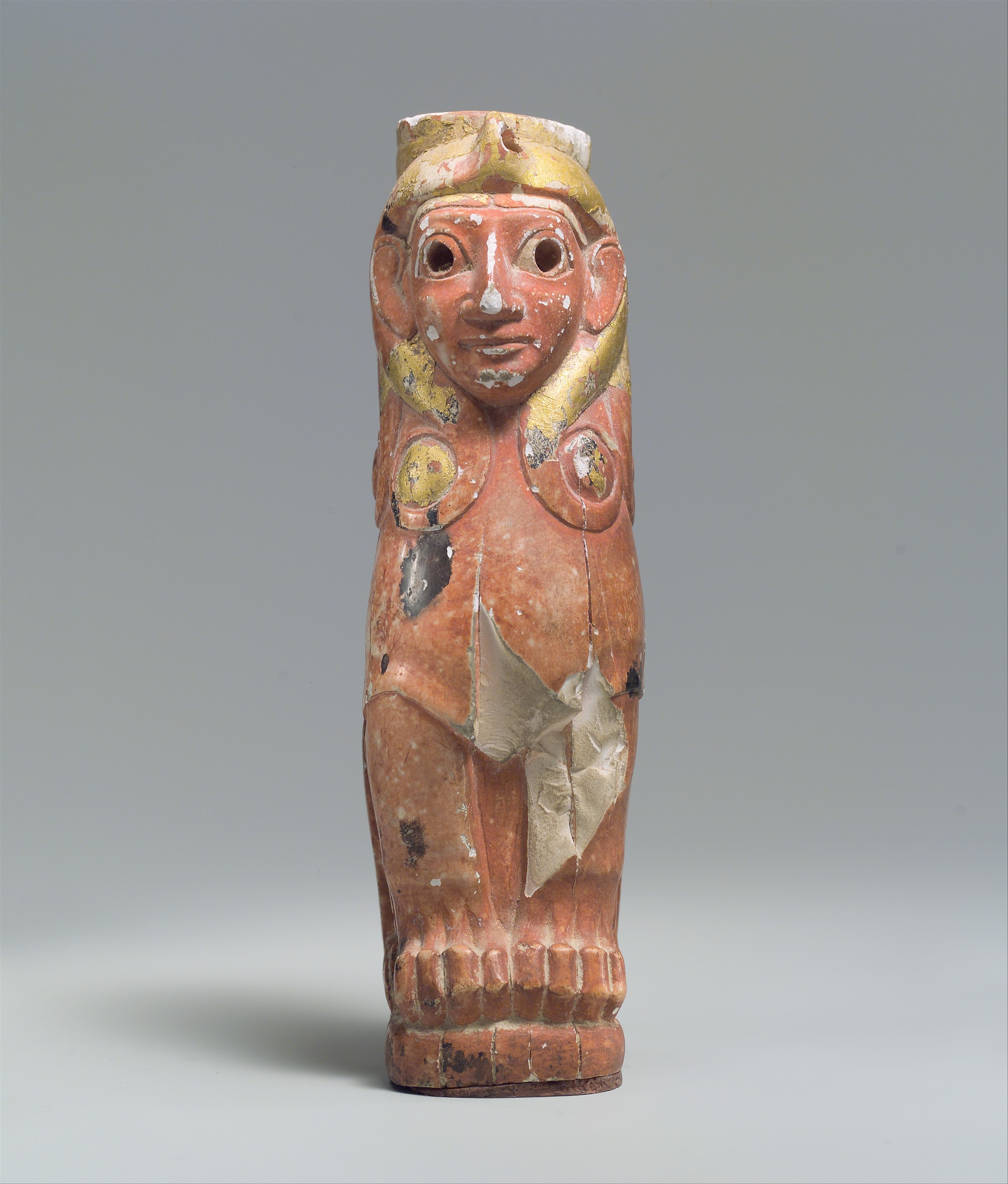
Ivory Hittite Sphinx, 18th century B.C.E.

Moving into the seventeenth century when the Hittites formed a larger state with their capital at Hattusa, the art style began incorporating larger and more permanent pieces such as stone reliefs in addition to the continuing tradition of seals. In more recent years, pieces that were thought to belong to this period have been moved to the New Kingdom period, and it may be that some works previously assigned to that era are actually from the Hittite Old Kingdom. Hittite seals could be made of anything from baked clay to gold. In addition to surviving objects, some knowledge of these seals also comes from the impressions they left on ceramics. Figures in the Old Kingdom period became more wiry, and were depicted in more violent situations. This is true for seals, reliefs, and small 3-dimensional figures. A common subject for art at this time was conflict among divine figures and struggles for power, which was not represented as much during the Hittite New Kingdom. Other scenes, like one relief on the neck of a silver rhyton housed in the Metropolitan Museum of Art, depict gods during hunts. There is a sense of temporal progression in the images of this piece, as there is a deer living and being confronted, and then lying conquered and prone further along the rim. There is also an assumption of spiritual connotations in this piece in regards to a "Protector God of the Wild Fields".

== New Kingdom ==
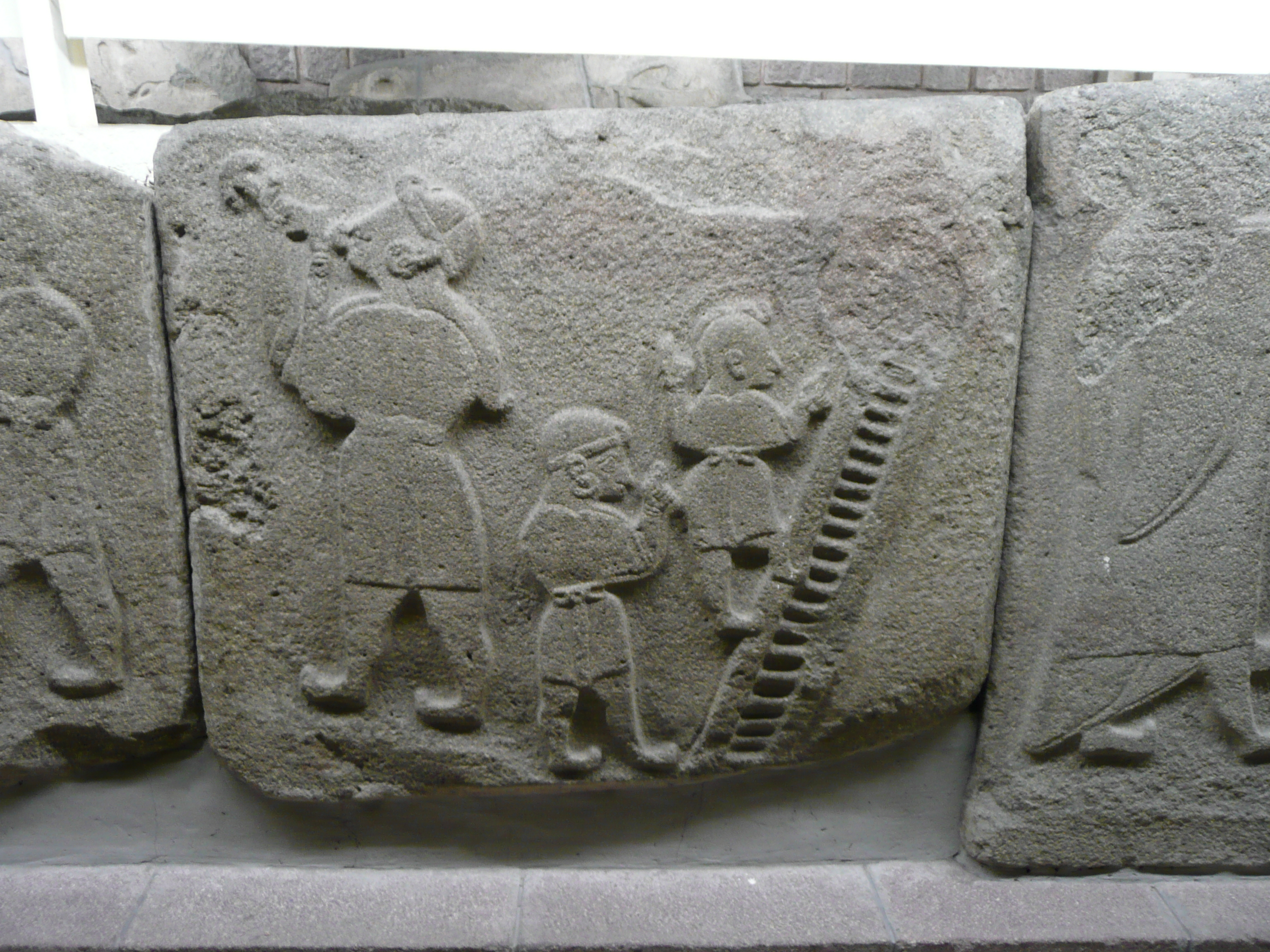
Scene from Alaca Höyük Sphinx Gate

Beginning in the fourteenth century and lasting into the twelfth century, this period saw even more creation of large-scale relief sculpture, and figures represented tend to be more solid, with thicker proportions. Much of the art found from the Hittite New Kingdom era comes from the settlement of Alaca Höyük. It is unclear which ancient city this correlates to, however it has been argued that it could be Tawiniya, Arinna, Hanhana, or Zippalanda. The most common opinion among scholars is that it is the holy city of Arinna, because of its proximity to the capital of Hattusa and the ritual practices depicted in art there.

A much-studied monument in this area that is argued to have been constructed at this time is a stone gate flanked by two carved sphinxes and cyclopean blocks covered in unfinished reliefs of a religious procession and hunting scenes. This procession depicts Hittite royalty and six priests approaching a god in the form of a bull, and a cast of entertainers including acrobats and jesters on ladders. The hunting scenes are on blocks directly above this procession. However, there is disagreement among scholars as to the exact construction date of this structure. Some place it between the fourteenth and fifteenth centuries, while others argue that it belongs in the second half of the thirteenth century. The guardians wear the long Hathor curls common to Hittite sphinxes since at least the eighteenth century BCE and were carved out of single blocks of stone 13 ft high and 6.5 ft thick. Another monument is the King's Gate leading into the temple district of in the upper city of Hattusa. Here a low relief of a god, 7 ft tall, looms.

Other reliefs of the Hittite exist on non-man-made structures. While some Hittite rock reliefs do not have inscriptions, and thus are difficult to date, others can be attributed to the reigns of specific kings such as Ḫattušili III, or Muwatalli II. Relief scenes from ancient Sam'al, in modern Zincirli Höyük, include a procession of gods on one wall and an image of a king named Tudḫaliya on the wall opposite it. There are a number of large recumbent lions in stone, of which the Lion of Babylon statue at Babylon is the largest, if it is indeed Hittite.

The ceramic works produced at this time, apart from rare decorative pieces, was mainly plain with simple forms and a focus on utility and function. Hittites did make use of potter's wheels, as well as the free sculpting of more animalistic forms. The forms and production methods were fairly consistent across the New Kingdom. A piece from the village of Gordion, on the fringes of the New Kingdom, could greatly resemble a piece from the capital, Hattusa.

A small stone seal bearing Hittite hieroglyphics has been discovered in Megiddo, indicating trade outside the New Kingdom. It also confirms the diplomatic ties with Egypt indicated by the Hittite-Egyptian Treaty, since Megiddo is an important stopping point for ambassadorial messengers between the two regions.

== Post-Hittite period ==
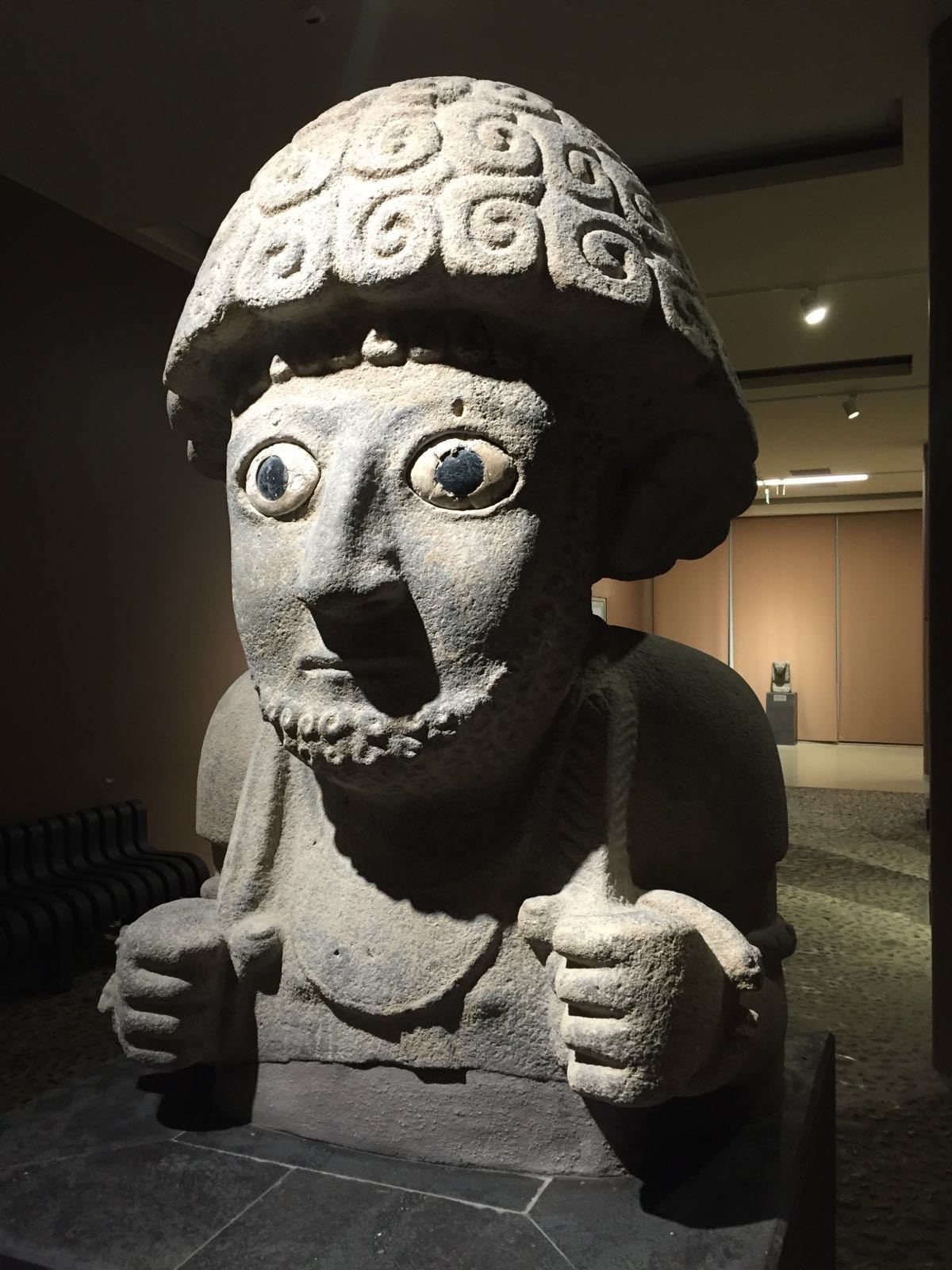
Statue from the Post-Hittite period, representing king Šuppiluliuma, ruler of the Luwian state of Pattin (Unqi)

During the 12th century BCE, Hittite society transitioned from the Bronze Age into the Iron Age. After the fall of the New Kingdom (c. 1180 BCE) many aspects of Hittite art continued to exist in various regions of Asia Minor that were previously influenced by Hittite political and cultural achievements. Political collapse of the New Kingdom was followed by rapid decline of the use of Hittite language, that gave way to the rise of closely related Luwian language, but in the same time, Hittite cultural heritage remained influential in various fields of visual and applied arts, particularly in minor states, both Luwian and Aramean, located in south-eastern Anatolia and north-western parts of modern Syria. Kingdom of Carchemish was the most prominent of these states. In all of those regions, older Hittite and Luwian heritage was increasingly mixed with Aramean, and also Assyrian influences. The terms "Post-Hittite", "Syro-Hittite", "Syro-Anatolian" and "Luwian-Aramean" are all used to describe this period and its art, which lasted until the states were conquered by the Neo-Assyrian Empire, by the end of the 8th century BCE. The term "Neo-Hittite" is sometimes also used for this period, by some scholars, but other scholars use the same term as designation for the previous period (New Kingdom). Those terminological questions are often debated among scholars, but still remain unresolved.

Although the states of the Post-Hittite period were much smaller, public sculpture increased, with many statues, and ceremonial exterior paths lined with orthostats or stone slabs carved with reliefs.

== Rock reliefs ==
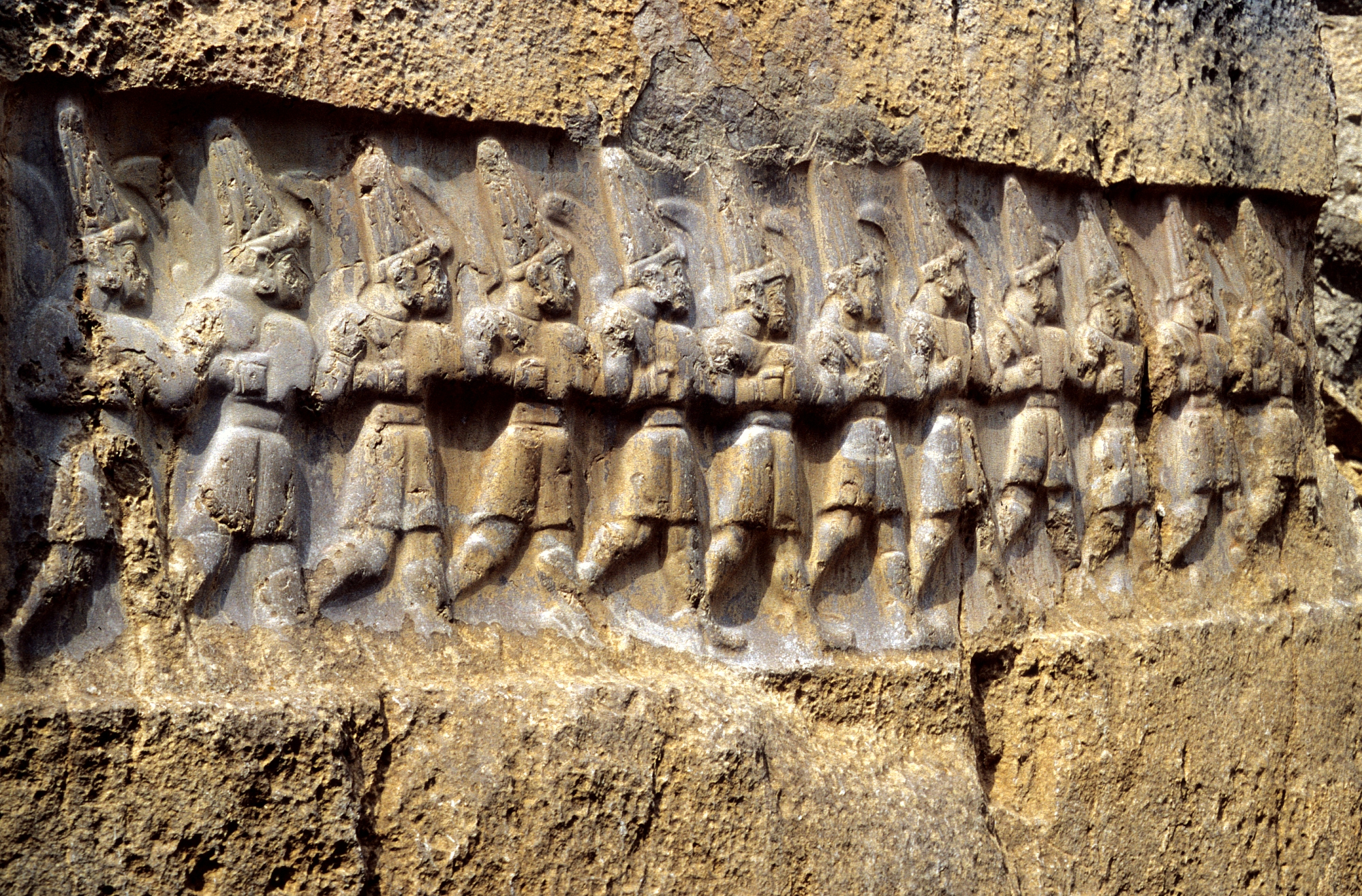
Hittite deities at Yazılıkaya

The Hittites were important producers of rock reliefs, which form a relatively large part of the few artistic remains they have left. The Karabel relief of a king was seen by Herodotus, who mistakenly thought it showed the Egyptian Pharaoh Sesostris. This, like many Hittite reliefs, is near a road, but actually rather hard to see from the road. There are more than a dozen sites, most over 1000 metres in elevation, overlooking plains, and typically near water. These perhaps were placed with an eye to the Hittite's relation to the landscape rather than merely as rulers' propaganda, signs of "landscape control", or border markers, as has often been thought. They are often at sites with a sacred significance both before and after the Hittite period, and apparently places where the divine world was considered as sometimes breaking through to the human one.

At Yazılıkaya, just outside the capital of Hattusa, a series of reliefs of Hittite gods in procession decorate open-air "chambers" made by adding barriers among the natural rock formations. The site was apparently a sanctuary, and possibly a burial site, for the commemoration of the ruling dynasty's ancestors. It was perhaps a private space for the dynasty and a small group of the elite, unlike the more public wayside reliefs. The usual form of these is to show royal males carrying weapons, usually holding a spear, carrying a bow over their shoulder, with a sword at their belt. They have attributes associated with divinity, and so are shown as "god-warriors".

Other rock reliefs include the İvriz relief, Manisa relief, Hanyeri relief, Fıraktın relief, Gökbez relief, İmamkullu relief, and Hemite relief.

== See also ==
- Hittites
- Hittite religion
- Hittite language
- Hittite inscriptions
- Hittite grammar
- Hittite phonology
- Hittite cuneiform
- Hittitology

== Sources ==
- Bonatz, Dominik, "Religious Representation of Political Power in the Hittite Empire", in Representations of Political Power: Case Histories from Times of Change and Dissolving Order in the Ancient Near East, eds, Marlies Heinz, Marian H. Feldman, 2007, Eisenbrauns, ISBN 157506135X, 9781575061351, google books
- Bryce, Trevor R. (2002). Life and Society in the Hittite World. New York: Oxford University Press. ISBN 9780199241705.
- Bryce, Trevor R. (2005) [1998]. The Kingdom of the Hittites (2nd revised ed.). New York: Oxford University Press. ISBN 9780199279081.
- Bryce, Trevor R. (2012). The World of The Neo-Hittite Kingdoms: A Political and Military History. New York: Oxford University Press. ISBN 9780191505027.
- Bryce, Trevor R. (2009). The Routledge Handbook of the Peoples and Places of Ancient Western Asia: The Near East from the Early Bronze Age to the fall of the Persian Empire. London-New York: Routledge. ISBN 9781134159079.
- Gilibert, Alessandra (2011). Syro-Hittite Monumental Art and the Archaeology of Performance: The Stone Reliefs at Carchemish and Zincirli in the Earlier First Millennium BCE. Berlin-New York: Walter de Gruyter. ISBN 9783110222258.
- Hawkins, John David (1982). "The Neo-Hittite States in Syria and Anatolia". The Cambridge Ancient History. Vol. 3. Cambridge: Cambridge University Press. pp. 372–441. ISBN 9780521224963.
- Harmanşah, Ömür (ed) (2014), Of Rocks and Water: An Archaeology of Place, 2014, Oxbow Books, ISBN 1782976744, 9781782976745
- Osborne, James F. (2020). The Syro-Anatolian City-States: An Iron Age Culture. New York: Oxford University Press. ISBN 9780199315833.
- Sader, Hélène (2010). "The Aramaeans of Syria: Some Considerations on their Origin and Material Culture". The Books of Kings: Sources, Composition, Historiography and Reception. Leiden-Boston: Brill. pp. 273–300. ISBN 978-9004177291.
