= Fıraktın relief =

Hittite relief carving

Coordinates: 38°16′18″N 35°37′54″E

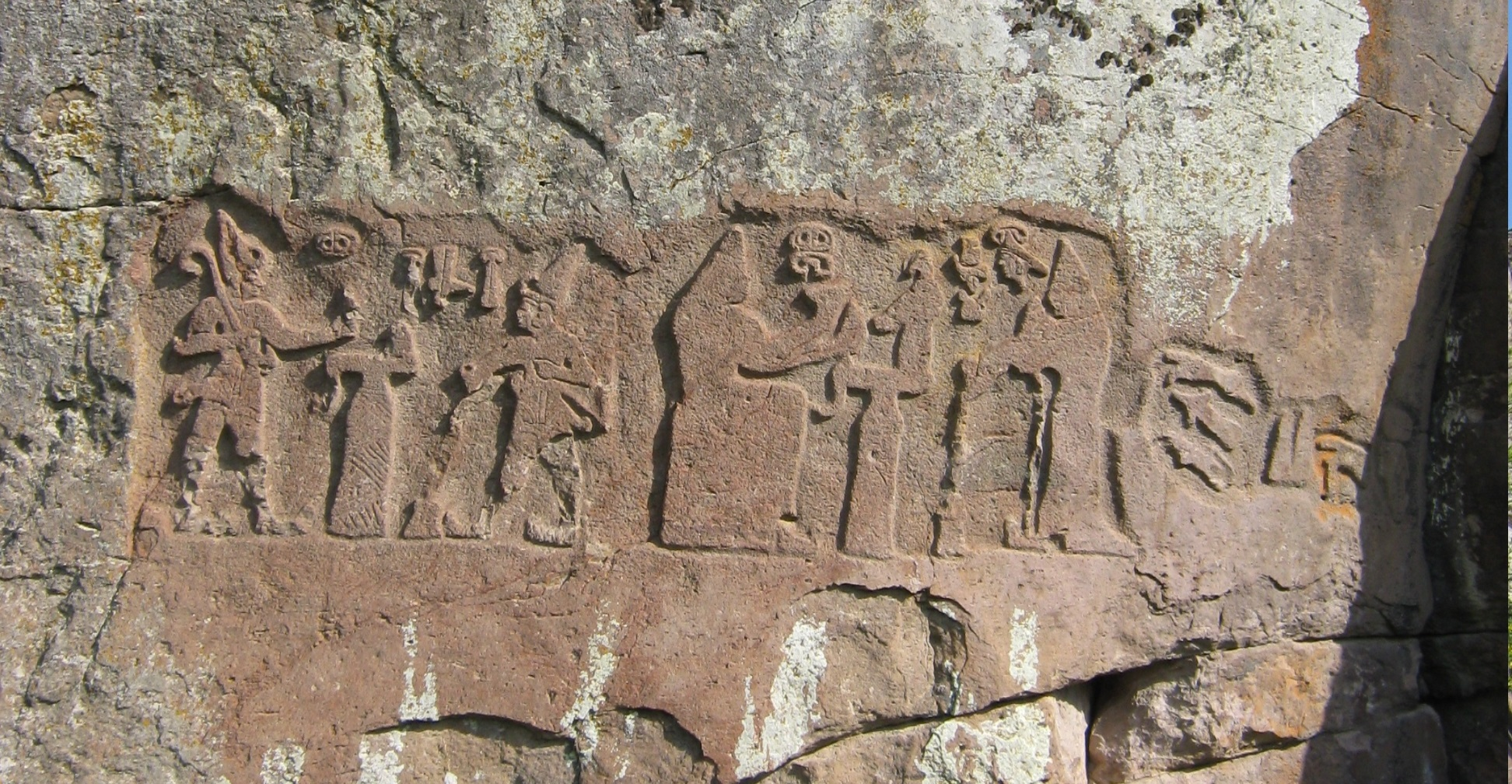
Weather god, Hattušili III, Sun goddess Hebat, Puduhepa

The Hittite rock relief Fıraktın relief (or Fraktın) is located roughly 50 km south of Kayseri in the province of the same name in southern Turkey, at Fıraktın on the bank of the Enzel Dere, a tributary of the Zamantı Irmağı. Strabo called the place Dastarkon. Rock reliefs are a prominent aspect of Hittite art.

== Location ==
The relief is in a steep valley, between Mount Erciyes and the Anti-Taurus Mountains east of Develi. The valley was historically an important route into Cilicia (and from there into Syria via the Gezbeli and Küçük Gezbeli passes). A Mycenaean vase was found nearby, which probably came via Cilicia. Between 1880 and 1939, five reliefs from Hittite times were discovered in this location, more than in any other spot in Anatolia. The other four reliefs are Hanyeri, İmamkullu and Taşçı A and B.

== Description ==
The relief is about 1.3 m x 3.2 m and was made in the 13th century BC, in the time of the Hittite empire. It faces northwest, towards Mount Erciyes, which like all mountains was worshiped in Hittite times. The relief is in three parts.

The left section shows the Hittite king Hattusili III (right) making an offering to the weather god, pouring water from a kind of beaked flagon into a vessel on the ground. Between them there is an altar like structure, with a grooved, conical item on top, probably offering-bread. Both the god and the king wear pointed hats, which symbolised divinity. From this, it can be concluded that the image was probably made after Hattusili's death in the reign of his son and successor Tudhaliya IV, since the Hittite kings were considered divine after their deaths. The weather god holds a crook in his hands. In front of each of their heads are hieroglyphic symbols, naming the depicted individuals.

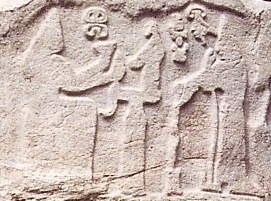
The Sun goddess & Puduhepa

In the middle scene is his wife, Tawannanna Puduhepa (right), making a libation to the Sun goddess Hebat. There is an altar between these two figures as well, with a bird or a bird-shaped vessel on top of it. The depiction gets rougher on the right end; probably the work was not finished.

The third part of the relief consists of massive Luwian hieroglyphs. The continue the description of the queen which begins beside her head, "Daughter of the land of Kizzuwatna, beloved by the divine."

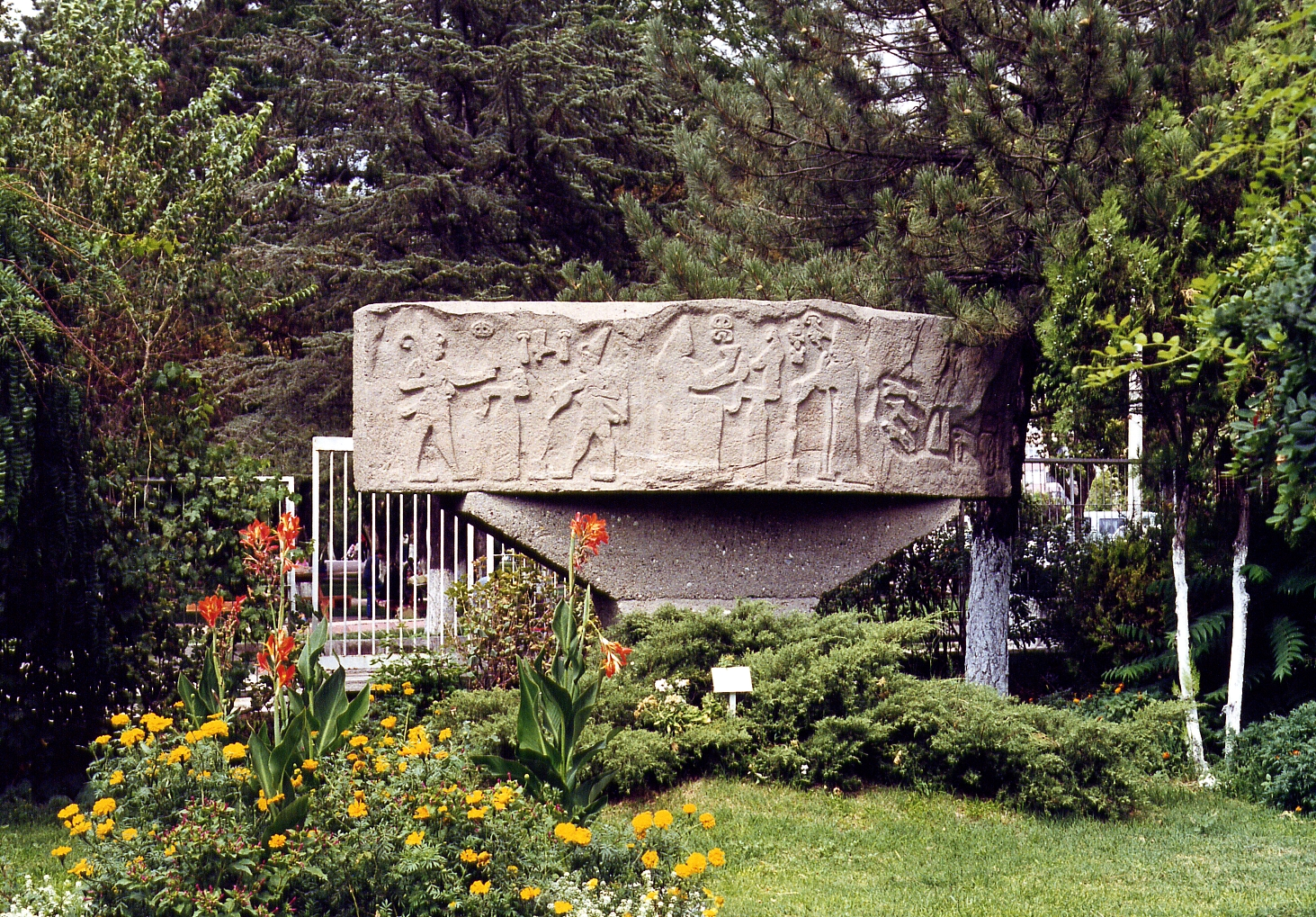
Copy at the Kayseri Museum

A concrete copy of the relief can be viewed at the Kayseri Museum, as well as a plaster cast in the Pergamonmuseum in Berlin.

== Bibliography ==
- Kay Kohlmeyer. "Felsbilder der hethitischen Großreichszeit." Acta Praehistorica et Archaeologica 15 (1983) pp. 67–74.
- Eberhard P. Rossner. Die hethitischen Felsreliefs in der Türkei. 2nd Edition, 1988, ISBN 3-924390-02-9.
- Horst Ehringhaus. Götter, Herrscher, Inschriften. Die Felsreliefs der hethitischen Großreichszeit in der Türkei. Zabern, Mainz 2005, ISBN 3-8053-3469-9, pp. 59–65.
