= Manisa relief =

Coordinates: 38.5978°N 27.5000°E

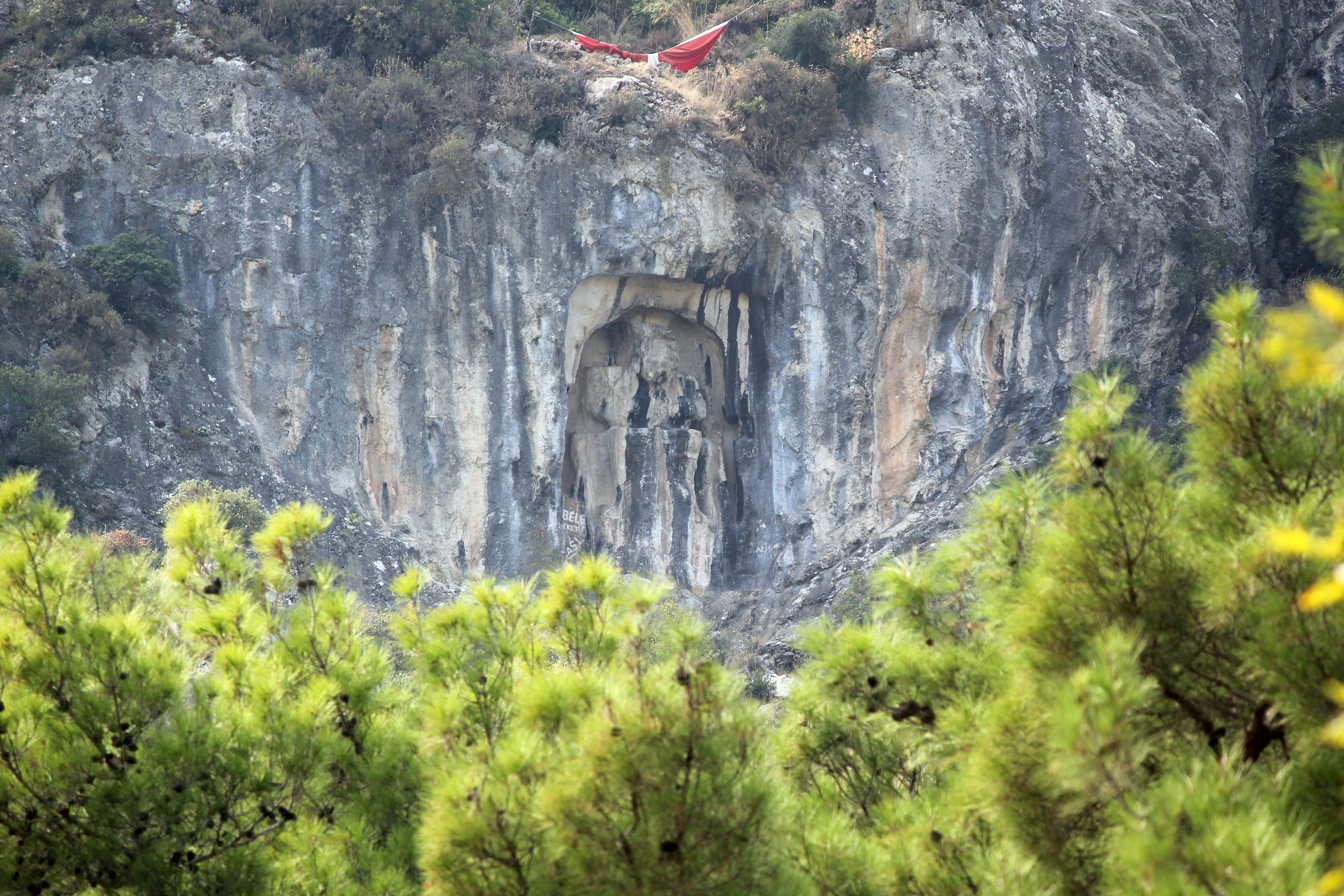
Manisa relief

Location of the Manisa relief in Turkey

The Manisa relief, also known as the Akpınar relief and the Cybele relief (Kibele or Turkish: 'Taş Suret' (Cliff image) or Sipil Heykeli (Sipylos Monument)), is a Hittite rock relief at Akpınar, about 5 km east of the Turkish provincial capital of Manisa above an amusement park on the road to Salihli. It depicts a Hittite divinity. Rock reliefs are a prominent aspect of Hittite art.

== Description ==
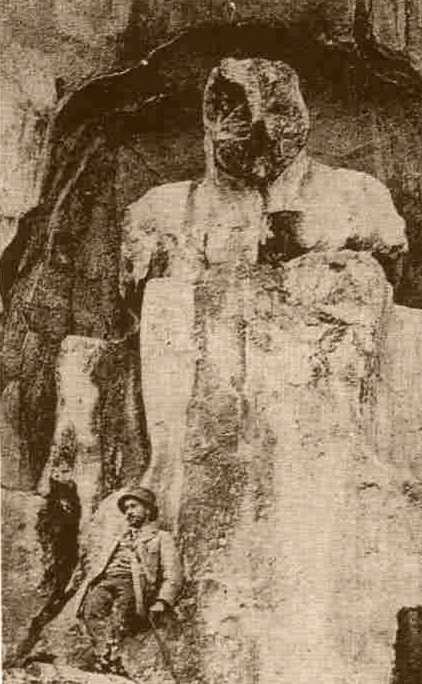
Depiction on a French postcard, c.1900

The relief is located in a niche about 100-120 m up a granite cliff-face of Mount Sipylus, overlooking the city of Manisa, the ancient Lydian city of Magnesia ad Sipylum, and the Gediz river valley (the ancient Hermos). It is over 6 m high and in poor condition.

A seated figure 8-10 m high is depicted in high relief (but not completely separated from the cliff face), who looks northwards and wears a tall pointed headdress. Its hands seem to rest on its breasts, the feet rest atop a footstool. The head has partly cleaved away, from natural causes.

Two remnants of Luwian hieroglyphic inscriptions are visible to the right of his head, which indicate that the relief dates to the Hittite period. Cecil John Cadoux thought a date in the time of Suppiluliuma I or his son Mursili II (i.e. 14th century BC) was probable. Helmuth Theodor Bossert read the leftmost inscription (Akpınar 1) as "Prince Kuwalanamuwa", the same name which is found on the Hanyeri relief and İmamkullu relief, but it is unclear whether all the three refer to the same individual. If they do, the prince under discussion must have been extremely influential, as there are no other individuals, except for Hittite kings, whose reliefs accompanied by hieroglyphic inscriptions are found in three distinct locations in Asia Minor. The right inscription (Akpınar 2) was not legible to Hans Gustav Güterbock, who studied the relief with R.A. Alexander in 1978.

== Reception ==
In the second century AD, Pausanias recorded the figure in his Description of Greece as a depiction of the mother goddess, Cybele, made by Broteas the son of Tantalos. Several travellers in the 18th and 19th centuries described the work, including Richard Chandler, Charles Texier, Gustav Hirschfeld and Archibald Henry Sayce. The interpretation of the figure is disputed. Bossert's identification with Cybele was rejected by Kurt Bittel as unsustainable, but he still saw a female goddess, as did Ekrem Akurgal. Peter Z. Spanos, however, interprets the figure as the Weather god, which conforms to the general tendency today to interpret the image as a male god; Ehringhaus suggests it is a mountain god.

As a result of confusion with a different natural rock formation near Manisa, which resembles a sitting figure and is known as Weeping Niobe, this relief is sometimes, incorrectly, known as the Niobe cliffs.

== Bibliography ==
- Kay Kohlmeyer. "Felsbilder der hethitischen Großreichszeit." Acta Praehistorica et Archaeologica 15 (1983) pp. 28-34.
- Peter Z. Spanos: "Einige Bemerkungen zum sogenannten Niobe-Monument bei Manisa (Magnesia ad Sipylum)." Beiträge zur Altertumskunde Kleinasiens. Festschrift für Kurt Bittel. Zabern, Mainz 1983, pp. 477-483.
- Maarten J. Vermaseren. Corpus Cultus Cybelae Attidisque (CCCA) Vol. 1: Asia Minor (= Etudes préliminaires aux religions orientales dans l'Empire Romain Vol. 50.1). Brill, Leiden. 1987, ISBN 90-04-05399-9, p. 129, in Google Books.
- Horst Ehringhaus. Götter, Herrscher, Inschriften. Die Felsreliefs der hethitischen Großreichszeit in der Türkei. Zabern, Mainz 2005, ISBN 3-8053-3469-9, pp. 84–87.

Akdeniz, Engin; Spil (Sipylos) Dağı’nın Kuzey Yamacındaki Akpınar Kaya Anıtı, Uğur Silistreli Anı Kitabı, in Memoriam Uğur Silistreli, Anadolu (Anatolia), Anı, Armağan Serisi, Ek Dizi III.3, (Ed.F.Kulakoğlu vd.), Editör, Ankara Üniversitesi Basımevi, Ankara, ss.1-9, 2019
