= İmamkullu relief =

Rock relief near the town of İmamkullu, Kayseri Province, Turkey

Coordinates: 38.2461°N 35.9292°E

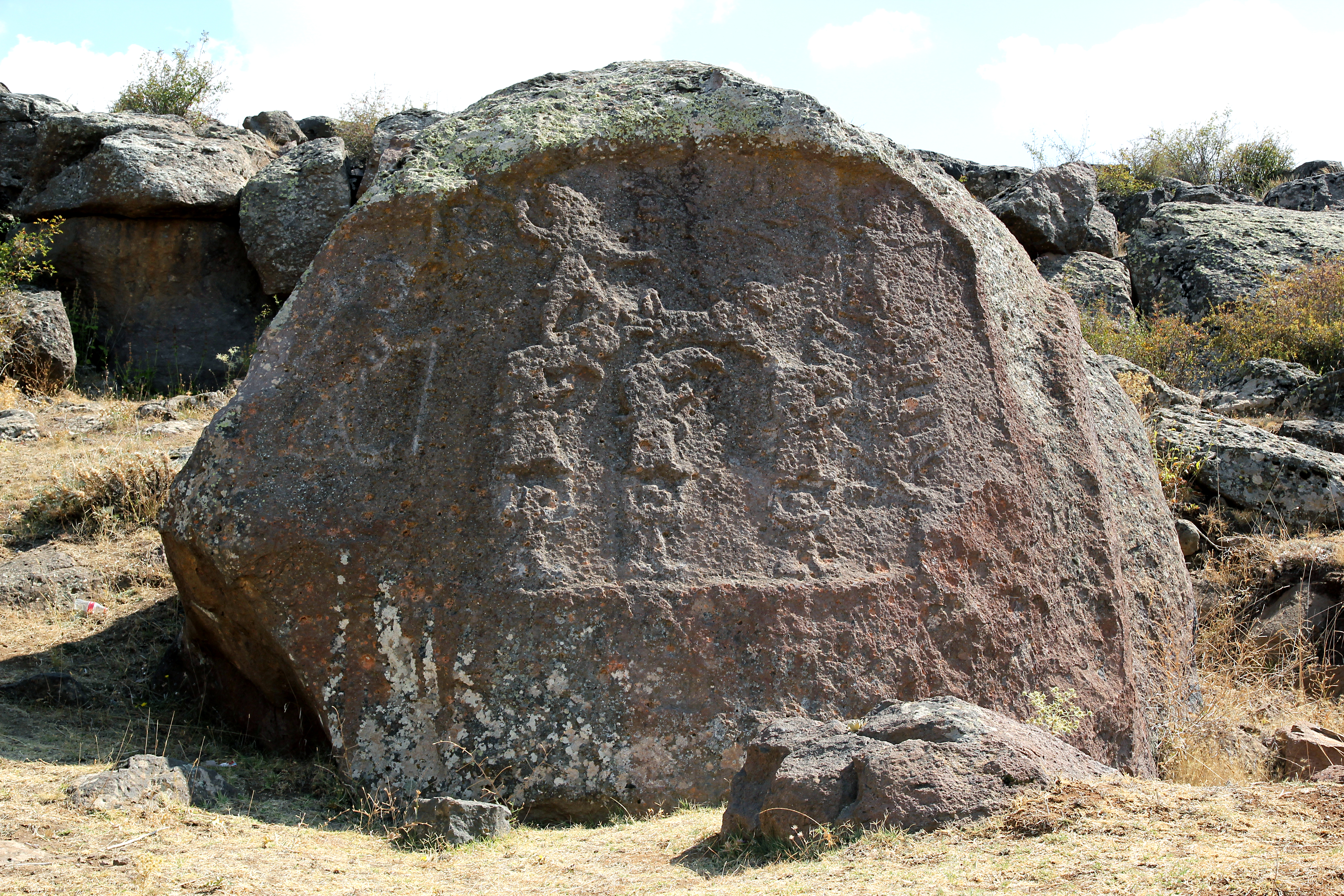
İmamkullu relief

Location of the İmamkullu relief in Turkey

The Hittite İmamkullu relief (previously also İmamkulu) is a rock relief near the town of İmamkullu in Tomarza district in Kayseri Province, Turkey. In Turkish it is known as Yazılı Kaya ("inscribed cliff") and Şimşekkaya ("lightning cliff"). Rock reliefs are a prominent aspect of Hittite art.

== Location ==
The trachyte block with the relief is located on the flank of the 3045 m high Bey Dağı to the south of İmamkullu. This spot marks the start of the Gezbel pass, where two routes met and crossed the Taurus Mountains in ancient times. One of them came from the Hittite heartland through Kayseri and Tomarza, following the Zamantı Irmağı river; the other came from Cappadocia via Develi, passing the Fıraktın and Taşçı reliefs on the way. The Hanyeri relief stands at the other end of the Gezbel pass, to the southeast.

== Description ==
The relief is about 3.25 x 2 metres and was engraved on the northwest side of a large boulder, on a slightly convex, but conveniently flat surface. It is now very worn. It consists of three sections. The left section features a human figure, moving to the right, perhaps the creator of the monument, holding a spear in his left hand and a bow in his left (the string is only roughly indicated). On his belt there are knobs and some traces of a sword. He wears a round cap and there are traces also of a horn and pointed shoes. Luwian hieroglyphs were engraved in front of his head, which name him as a son of the king. His name is given as Kuwalanamuwa. A prince of this name is also known from the Hanyeri and Manisa reliefs. Whether they are all the same person is not certain, though certainly possible.

The central portion is the largest. In the upper part, the weather god is depicted in a chariot, driving to the right. He wears pointy shoes, a short soldier's kilt and a pointed hat with horns, which identifies him as a god. Traces of a sword can also be seen on his belt. He has a mace in his right hand and holds the reins of the galloping bulls which pull his chariot with his left hand. Above his outstretched hand there are three hieroglyphs which name him as the weather god of heaven; a fourth hieroglyph below the others is no longer legible. The god and his chariot stand on the bent necks of three mountain gods, in a manner similar to the main scene at Yazılıkaya. The wear the long robes and peaked hats which are usual for mountain gods, and are armed with swords. They themselves stand on top of three chimaeric creatures with cat's heads and raised human arms.

The top part of the right portion of the relief shows a facing goddess with raised arms, who is probably Šauška/Ishtar. Her head is in profile, looking left towards the approaching weather god. Her arms hold her robe open. On her head there are four or five prongs of a crown or coiffure. Wings rise up from her shoulders. Ehringhaus identifies a six-pointed star above her right hand. Her legs are depicted without feet, in the manner of cult statues and she stands on top of a stylised tree. Between the weather god and the goddess, is a bird flying to the left. The motif of the weather god and an undressing goddess, often with a bird between them, is attested from the early Bronze Age on Syrian cylinder seals (and other media). Jutta Börker-Klähn proposes a connection with the Asherdu myth, in which Ishtar in the form of a bird catches the weather god having sex with Asherdu, the wife of Elkunirsa.

The relief is dated to the 13th century BC, the late Hittite empire, like the Hanyeri relief.

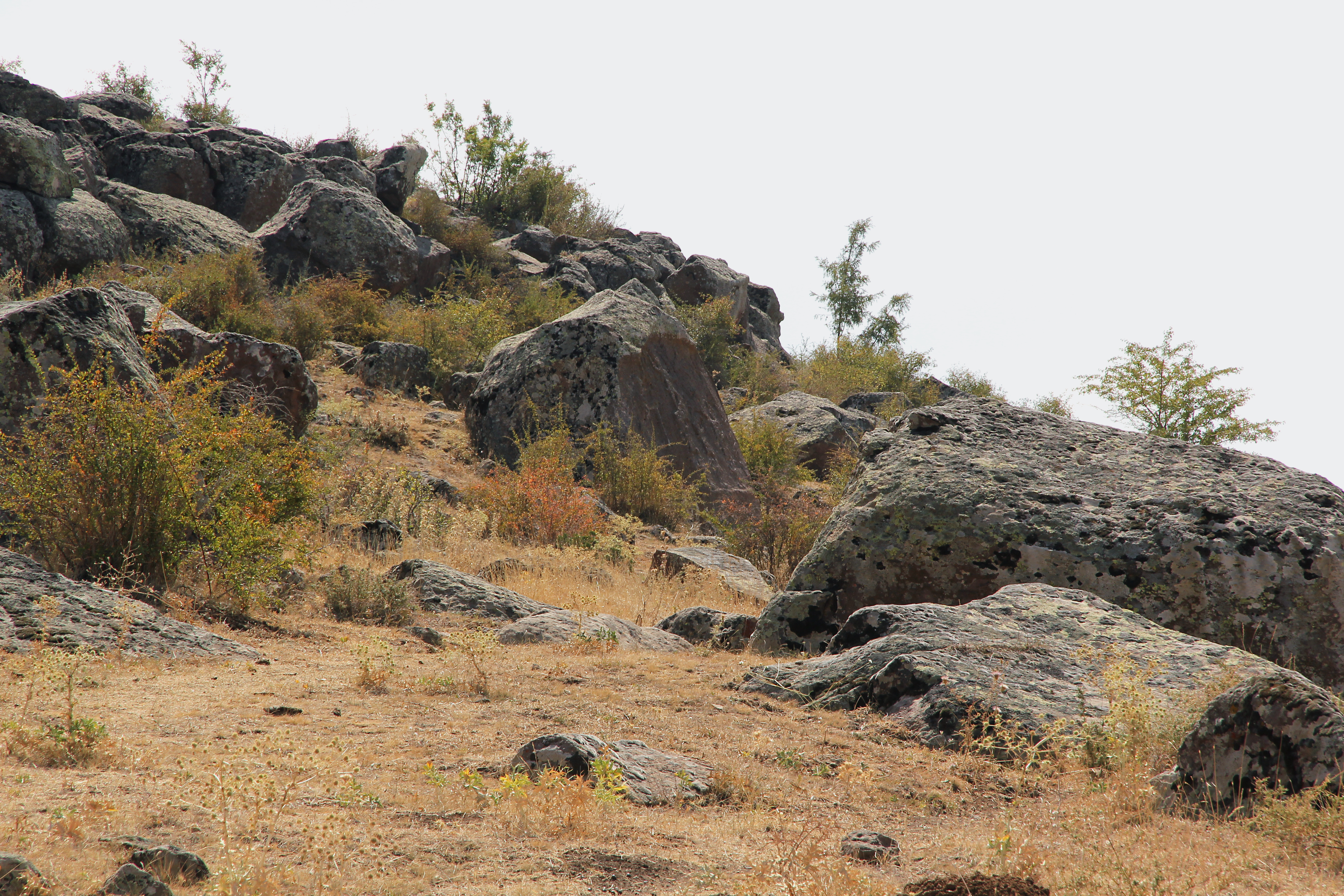
Location of the relief on the mountain side

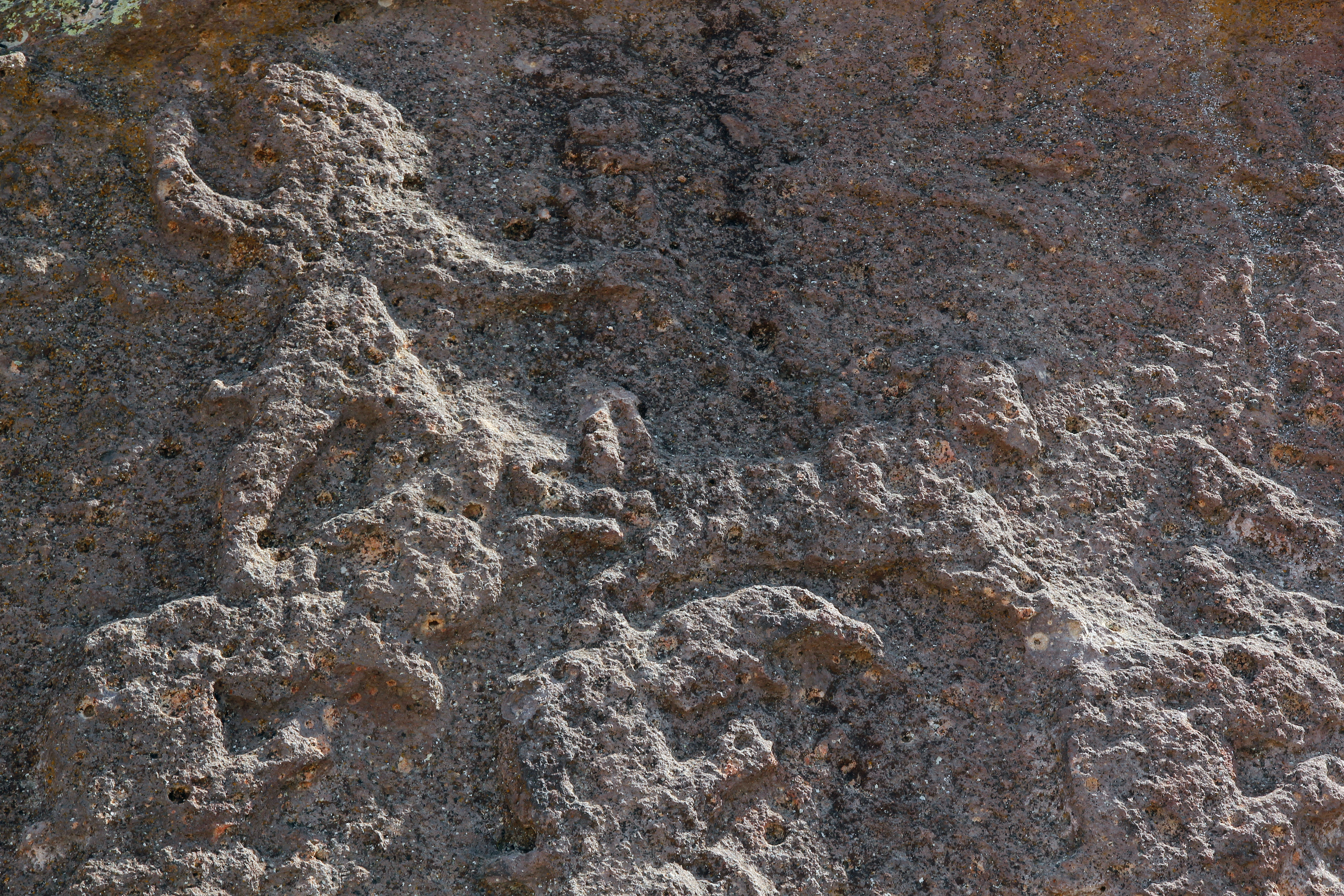
Weather god in his chariot

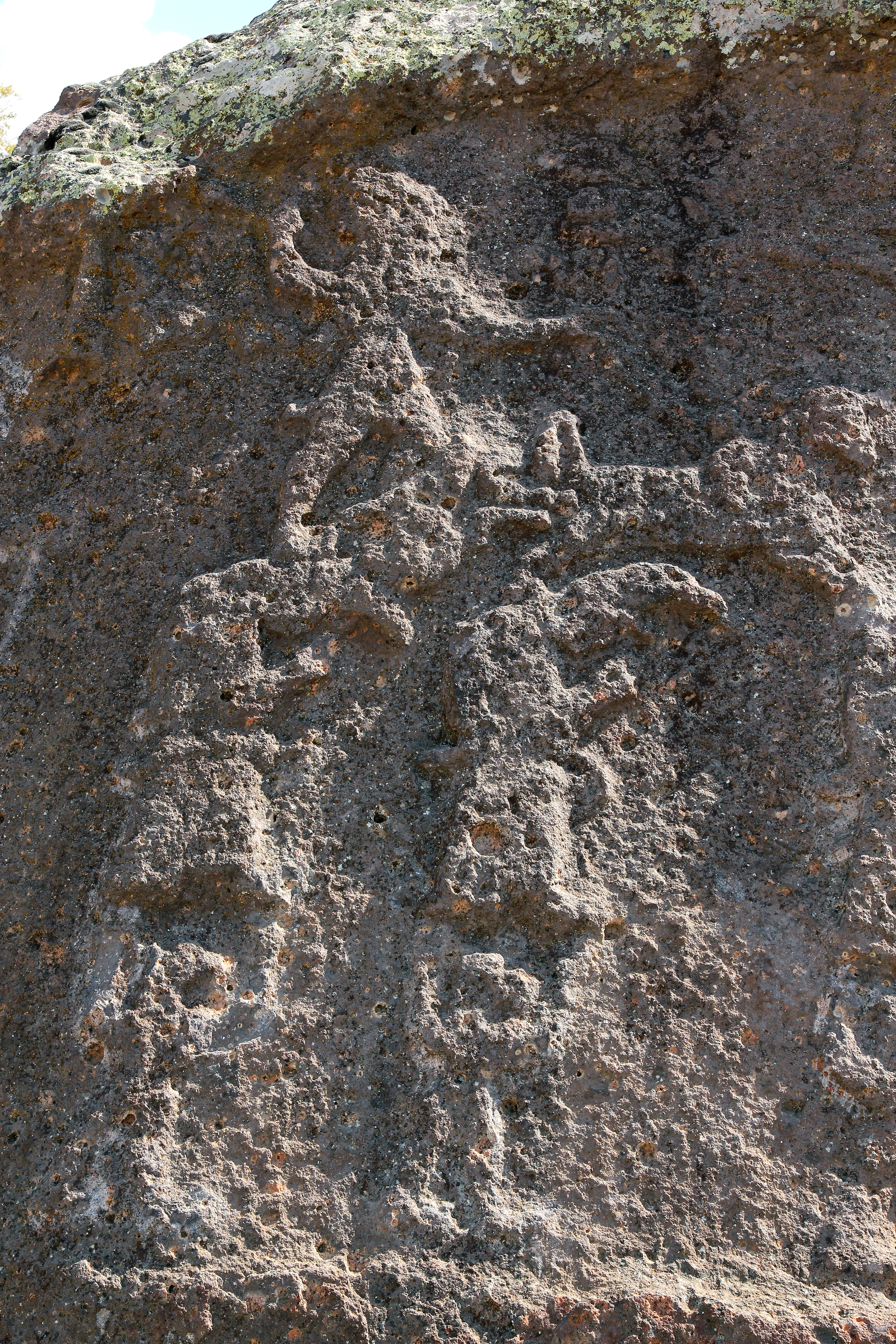
Mountain gods and chimaeric creatures

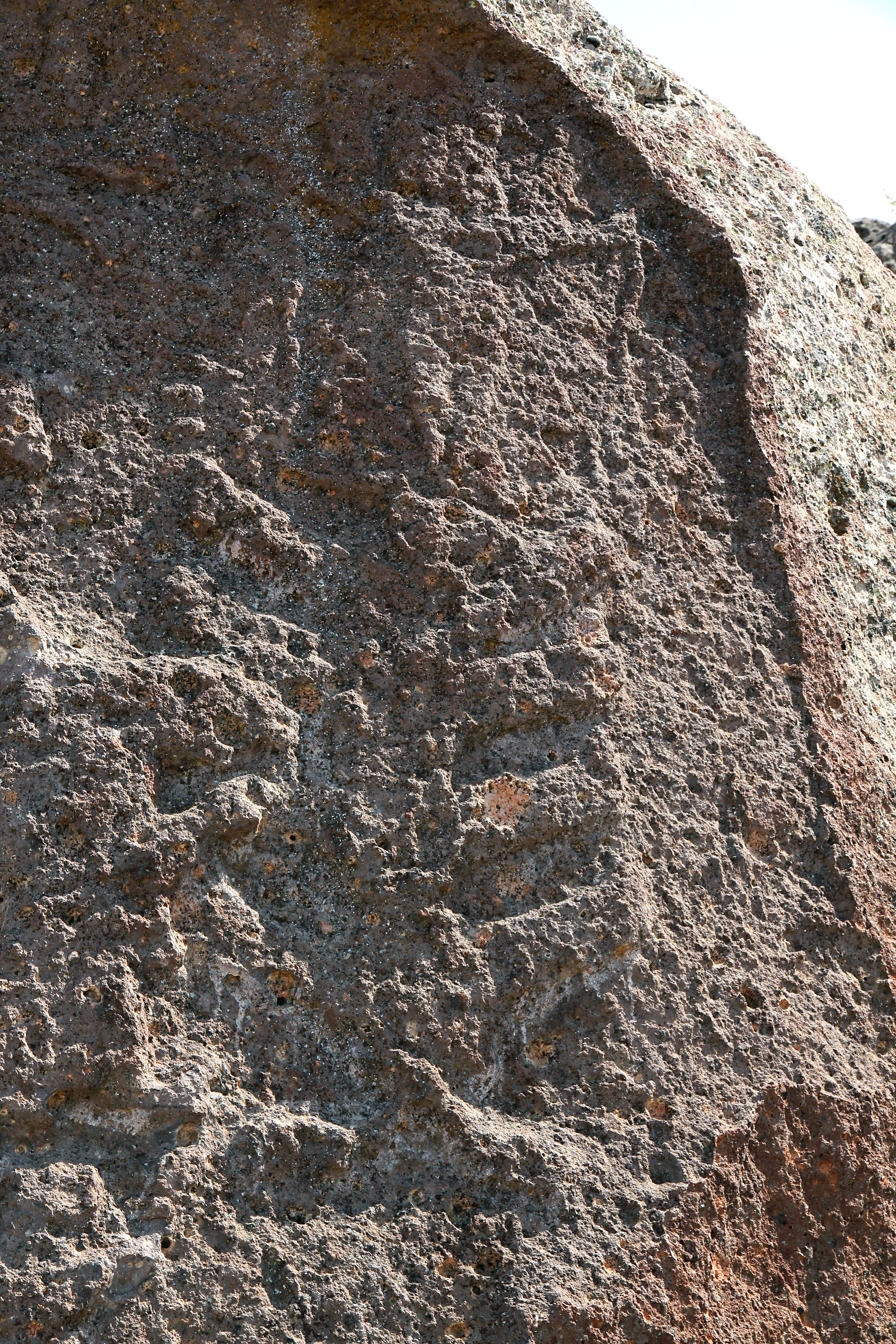
Undressing goddess on stylised tree

== Research history ==
A report was first published by the French orientalist Louis Delaporte after its discovery by Kemaleddin Karamete of Kayseri in 1934. In 1935 the American orientalist Ignace Gelb visited the site. Sedat Alp and Ekrem Akurgal recorded the inscription in their Anatolian work of 1947. In 1975, Markus Wäfler published a description of the relief and its inscriptions. In the same year, Piero Meriggi proposed a reading of the hieroglyphs, which Hans Gustav Güterbock, who visited the relief in 1978, supported. A different reading of the left hand figure's name was proposed by Jutta Börker-Klähn. In 1983, Kay Kohlmeyer published a detailed description and discussion of the monument. Finally, Horst Ehringhaus provides another description of the image and inscriptions in his 2005 book on the cliff inscriptions of the Hittite empire.

A cast of the relief is displayed outside the Archaeological Museum of Kayseri.

== Bibliography ==
- Jutta Börker-Klähn. "Imamkulu gelesen und datiert?" Zeitschrift für Assyriologie und Vorderasiatische Archäologie 67 (1977) pp. 64–72.
- Kay Kohlmeyer. "Felsbilder der hethitischen Großreichszeit." Acta Praehistorica et Archaeologica 15 (1983) pp. 80–86.
- Joost Hazenbos. "Zum Imamkulu-Relief." in Piotr Taracha (Ed.): Silva Anatolica. Anatolian Studies Presented to Maciej Popko on the Occasion of his 65th Birthday. Agade, Warschau 2002, ISBN 83-87111-12-0, pp. 147–161.
- Horst Ehringhaus. Götter, Herrscher, Inschriften. Die Felsreliefs der hethitischen Großreichszeit in der Türkei. Zabern, Mainz 2005, ISBN 3-8053-3469-9, pp. 70–76.
