= Hemite relief =

Hittite rock relief in Turkey

Coordinates: 37.1844°N 36.0932°E

Location of the Hemite relief in Turkey

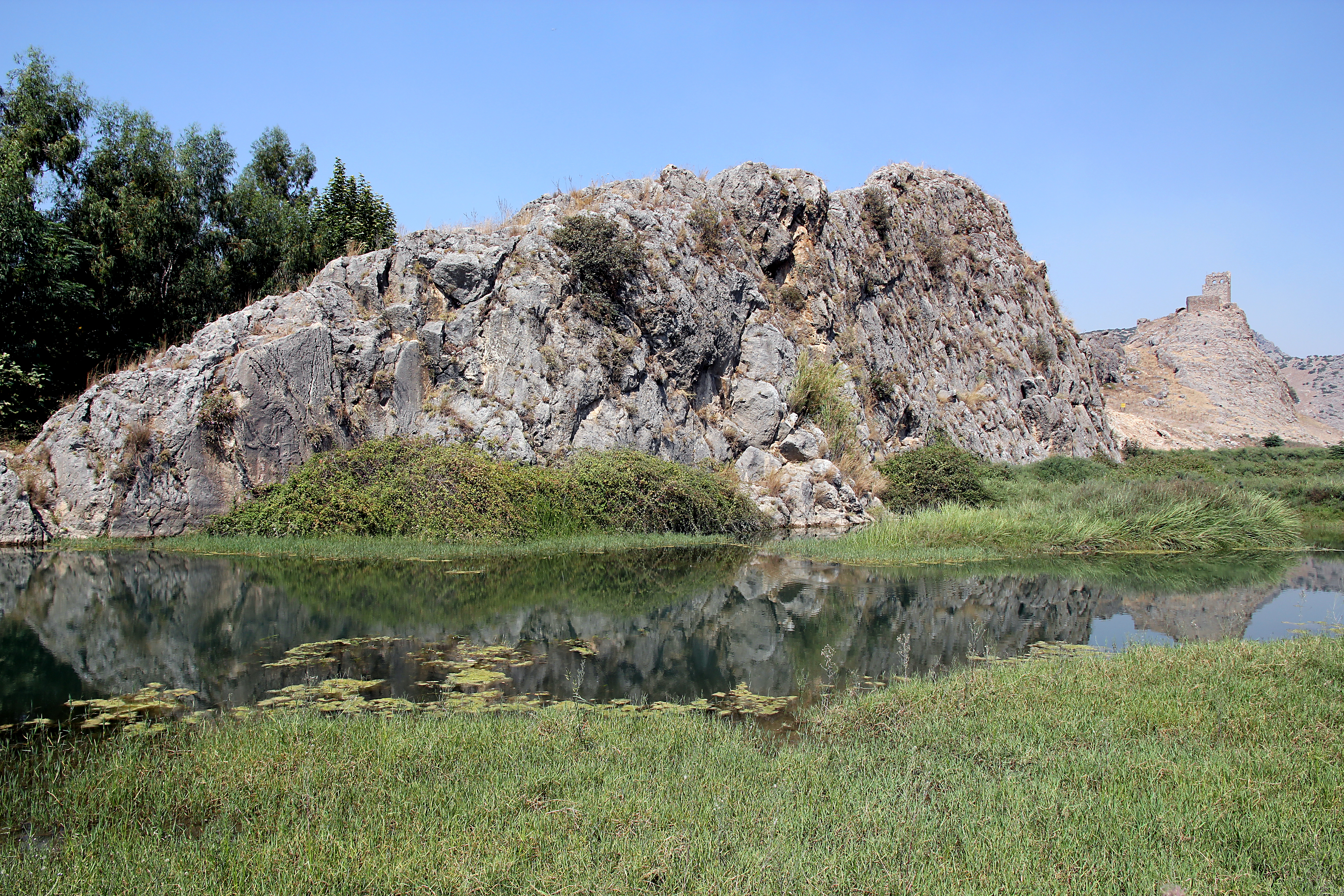
The outcrop with the relief (left), in the background Amouda castle (Hemite Kalesi)

The Hemite relief is a Hittite rock relief at Gökçedam (formerly Hemite) in the central district of Osmaniye Province in Turkey, about 20 km northwest of the provincial capital of Osmaniye. Rock reliefs are a prominent aspect of Hittite art.

== Location ==
The relief, dating from the Hittite empire in the second millennium BC is located on the north bank of the Ceyhan river and faces south-southeast. In ancient times, the route from the Hittite heartland in the north, over the Anti-Taurus Mountains to Syria ran along this side of the river, before crossing it - so it linked Kizzuwatna (later called Cilicia) with east Anatolia. The importance which this nodal point retained even into the Middle Ages is indicated by the Armenian fortress of Amouda (now Hemite Kalesi) only 400 m further north.

== Description ==
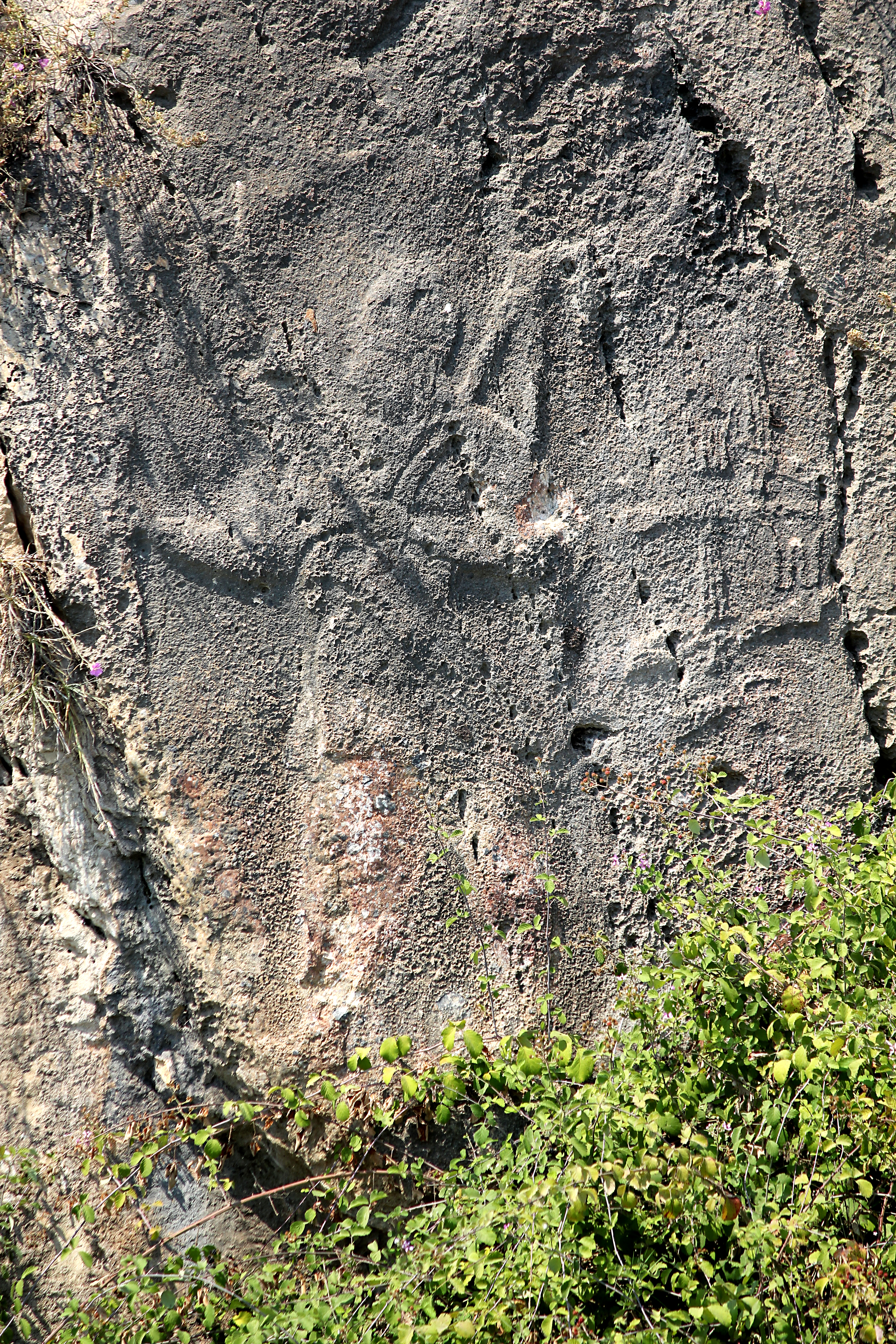
Hemite relief

The relief depicts a male figure, about 1.75 m high, whose clothing and weapons identify him as a warrior. In his outstretched right hand he holds a (badly weathered) spear. His left hand holds his bow which is borne over his shoulder. On the left side of his body there is a sword - the halfmoon grip and a loop for hanging it from his belt are clearly visible. He is dressed in a semi-circular cap with decorative bands, a short kilt and the ubiquitous Hittite pointed shoes. A large ring hangs from his ear. To the right of the image are two groups of Luwian hieroglyphs, one above the other. According to John David Hawkins' translation, they name the figure as:

...Tarḫunta, Prince
Son of Tarḫuntabija, Prince

Hawkins suggests a possible connection with the Tarḫuntabijammi who is named in the Hanyeri relief. A prince named Tarḫuntabija also appears in the list of witnesses to the Ulmitessuba-Treaty made under Hattusili III (r. c. 1265-1240 BC).

The initial description of the relief was produced by Helmuth Theodor Bossert in 1946. The first detailed description was undertaken by Alfonso Archi.

== Bibliography ==
- Horst Ehringhaus. Götter, Herrscher, Inschriften. Die Felsreliefs der hethitischen Großreichszeit in der Türkei, Zabern, Mainz, ISBN 3-8053-3469-9, pp. 107–111.
- Kay Kohlmeyer: "Felsbilder der hethitischen Großreichszeit." Acta Praehistorica et Archaeologica 15 (1983) pp. 90–95.
