= Hanyeri relief =

Settlement in Turkey

Coordinates: 38.2134°N 36.0149°E

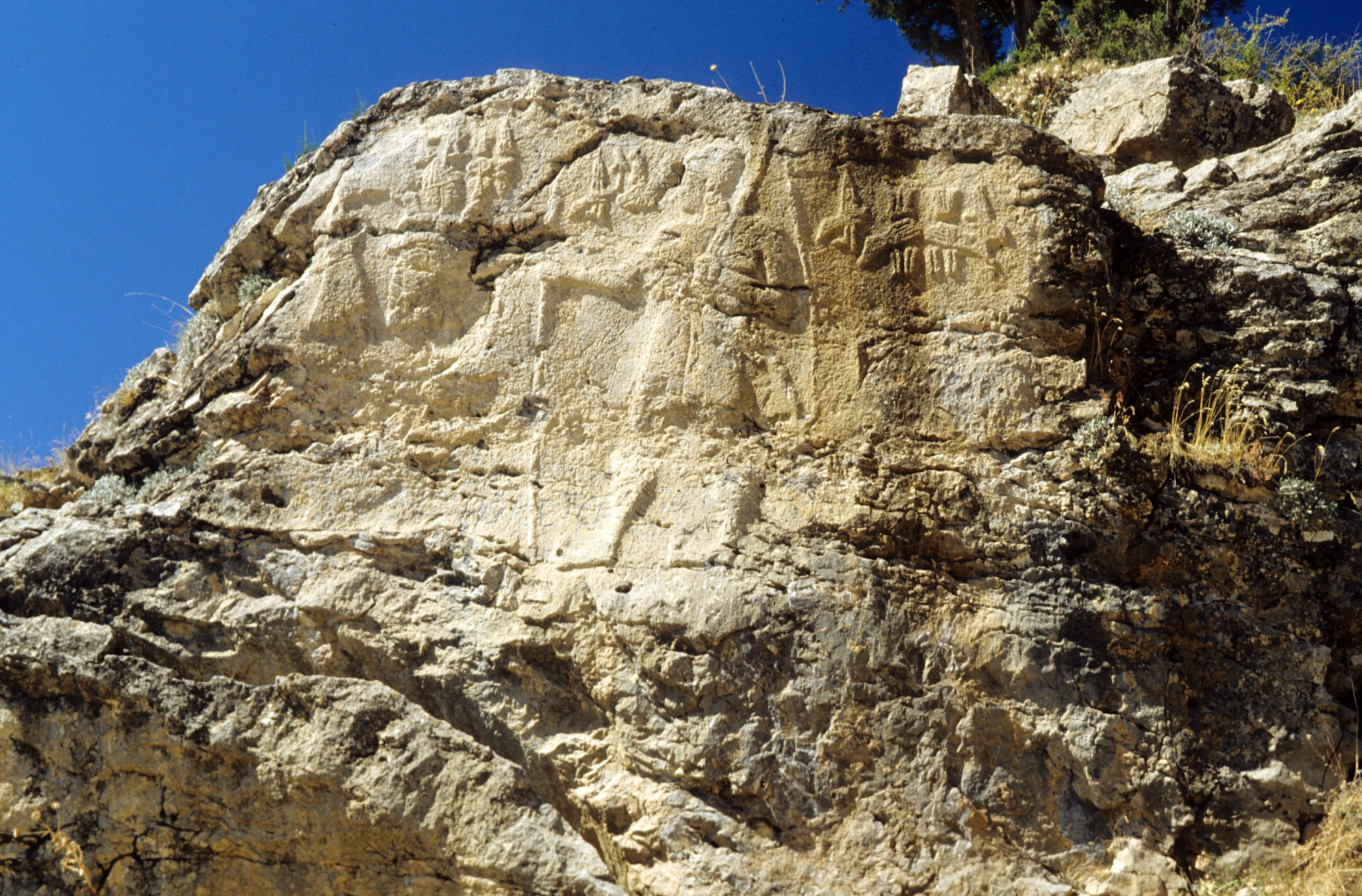
Hanyeri relief

Location of the Hanyeri relief in Turkey

The Hanyeri relief (or Gezbeli relief) is a Hittite rock relief near Hanyeri on the road from Tufanbeyli to Develi in Tufanbeyli district in Adana Province, about 80 km southeast of Kayseri, in Turkey. In Hittite times, the route over the 1960 m high Gezbeli Pass through the Taurus Mountains, which connected the Hittite heartland on the Kızılırmak River with Cilicia, passed by here. At the other end of the pass, to the northwest, is the İmamkullu relief. Rock reliefs are a prominent aspect of Hittite art.

== Description ==
The Hanyeri relief was discovered in 1939 by Ali Rıza Yalgın, then director of the Adana Archaeology Museum and dates to the 13th century BC. It is about four metres above floor level and is about 2 m x 3.5 m. A bull is depicted on the left hand side, standing on the shoulders of two mountain goddesses. Hieroglyphs name the bull as the god Sarruma. A border warrior stands in the centre, facing left, with a bow hung over his shoulder and a spear in his right hand. He wears a short tunic and pointy shoes. He is identified by an inscription as the "son of a king" and his name probably reads "Ku(wa)lanamuwa." The same name appears on the Manisa relief and the İmamkullu relief, but it is not clear whether all three refer to the same person. This inscription is located left of the prince's head and is in Luwian hieroglyphs. Another inscription appears behind the prince's back (unusually) and is probably not related to the figural relief. J.D. Hawkins reads it as the name "Tarḫuntabijammi"; it may have been added later. Hawkins connects this name with a prince "Tarḫuntabija," who is named in the Hemite relief.

As of 2013, the monument was in poor condition and no longer recognisable.

== Bibliography ==
- Kay Kohlmeyer. "Felsbilder der hethitischen Großreichszeit." Acta Praehistorica et Archaeologica 15 (1983) pp. 86–90.
- Eberhard P. Rossner. Felsdenkmäler in der Türkei. Band 1: Die hethitischen Felsreliefs in der Türkei. Ein archäologischer Führer. 2nd expanded edition. Rossner, München 1988, ISBN 3-924390-02-9.
- Horst Ehringhaus. Götter, Herrscher, Inschriften. Die Felsreliefs der hethitischen Großreichszeit in der Türkei. Zabern, Mainz 2005, ISBN 3-8053-3469-9, pp. 75–80.
