= Hittite =

Hittite may refer to:

- Hittites, ancient Anatolian people
  - Hittite language, the earliest-attested Indo-European language
  - Hittite grammar
  - Hittite phonology
  - Hittite cuneiform
  - Hittite inscriptions
  - Hittite laws
  - Hittite religion
  - Hittite music
  - Hittite art
  - Hittite cuisine
  - Hittite navy
  - Hittite kings
  - Hittite sites
  - Hittite studies
- Neo-Hittite states, Iron Age states located in modern Turkey and Syria
- Biblical Hittites, also known as the "Children of Heth"
- Hittite Microwave Corporation, a former semiconductor manufacturer now owned by Analog Devices

== See also ==
- Hatti (disambiguation)
- Hattush (disambiguation)
- Hattian (disambiguation)
- Hattic (disambiguation)
