= Hittite phonology =

Sounds and pronunciation of the Hittite language

Hittite phonology is the description of the reconstructed phonology or pronunciation of the Hittite language. Because Hittite as a spoken language is extinct—having left no living daughter languages—and no contemporary descriptions of the pronunciation are known, little can be said with certainty about the phonetics and the phonology of the language. Some conclusions can be drawn, however, by noting its relationship to the other Indo-European languages, by studying its orthography, and by comparing loanwords from nearby languages.

== Consonants ==
Consonant phonemes
		Labial	Alveolar	Palatal	Velar	Labio-velar	Uvular
Plosive	fortis	pː	tː		kː	kʷː	
Plosive	lenis	p	t		k	kʷ	
Nasal	fortis	mː	nː				
Nasal	lenis	m	n				
Liquid	fortis		rː, lː				
Liquid	lenis		r, l				
Fricative	fortis		sː				χː, χʷː
Fricative	lenis		s				χ, χʷ
Affricate			t͡s				
Approximant				j		w	

=== Plosives ===
Hittite had two series of consonants, which may be described as fortis and lenis; one of which was always rendered as a geminate, whereas the other was always rendered as a singleton. In cuneiform, all consonant sounds except for glides could be geminate. It has long been noticed that the geminate series of plosives is the one descending from Proto-Indo-European voiceless stops, and the simple plosives come from both voiced and voiced aspirate stops. This is often referred as Sturtevant's law. Because of typological implications of Sturtevant's law, the distinction between the two series is commonly regarded as one of voice. However, there is still disagreement over the subject among scholars, some of whom view both series as if they were differentiated by length, which a literal interpretation of the cuneiform orthography would suggest.

Supporters of a length distinction usually point to the fact that Akkadian, the language from which the Hittites borrowed the cuneiform script, had voicing. Hittite scribes nevertheless used voiced and voiceless signs interchangeably. Alwin Kloekhorst has also argued that the absence of assimilatory voicing is also evidence for a length distinction, pointing out that the word "e-ku-ud-du - *[ɛ́gʷtu]" does not show any voice assimilation, provided that the singulate signs stood for voiced consonants. If the distinction were one of voice, agreement between the stops should be expected since the velar and the alveolar plosives are known to be adjacent as the "u" in that word does not stand for a vowel but instead represents labialization.

=== Resonants ===
All resonants in Hittite coincide with their respective etymological pronunciations in Proto-Indo-European, which makes it unlikely that they were pronounced differently. Just like in the parent language, in Hittite resonants were syllabic interconsonantally. They were written in Hittite with cuneiform sign containing the vowel "a" (wa-a-tar - [wáːtr̩], la-a-ma-an - [láːmn̩]). However, it is not well known if Hittite inherited the bilabial syllabic nasal. In final position, Hittite added an epenthetic vowel /ɔ/ (Hittite e-šu-un - [ɛ́ːsɔn] < Proto-Indo-European *h₁és-m̥). Some cognates may point that Proto-Indo-European *m̥ merged with Hittite /a/ in medial and initial position.

Resonants in Hittite could be geminate or simple, but that distinction was not inherited from Proto-Indo-European but is instead often believed to have been caused by assimilation.

=== Affricate ===
The affricate is generally assumed to have been an alveolar t͡s. It is written in Hittite with signs containing a "z" and is known to have as a main phonological source the affrication of a "*t". In the prehistory of Hittite, a "*t" could be affricated if it was followed by "*s" or by "*i̯". That is known since "t"-stem nouns have a nominative ending in "z" and some verbal desinences descended from a prehistorical sequence "*ti". Therefore, the following development is usually assumed [tːj] > [tːʲ] > [t͡ɕ] > [t͡ʃ] > [t͡s]. A secondary source of the sign "z" is an early Indo-European dissimilation that occurred between two adjacent dentals, which consisted in the insertion of "*s" between them (e-ez-du - [ɛ́ːt͡stu] < "*h₁éd-tu").

Some advocates of a voice/voiceless series propose a voiced counterpart, which is rather controversial, and claim that whenever "z" was geminate, it represented [t͡s] and that when it was simple, it was pronounced [d͡z].

=== Fricatives ===
Hittite is believed to have had a sibilant, a uvular fricative and a labialized uvular fricative. They were written in the original script with signs containing "š" and "ḫ". In Akkadian cuneiform, they originally stood for a voiceless alveolar fricative and a voiceless velar fricative, respectively.

It can be said with confidence that "š" stood for a single phoneme. Although the exact place of articulation of the Hittite phoneme written with signs having an "š" cannot be determined with absolute certainty, there are various arguments for assuming it to have been an alveolar sibilant. Typologically, if a language has fricatives, it almost certainly has /s/, and languages that lack both phonemes are rare. Moreover, /s/ is known to descend from Proto-Indo-European *s, which is uncontroversially reconstructed as a voiceless alveolar sibilant.

Furthermore, the signs that the Hittite scribes adopted for "š" stood in Akkadian for [s] as well. It has been noted also that "š" appears in Ugaritic loanwords as ṯ, such as the Hittite royal name "Šuppiluliuma", which is written in Ugaritic as ṯpllm". Given that Semitic *ṯ merged with *š in Ugaritic, also suggests a pronunciation of [s]. It has also been noted that Hittite royal names containing an "š" are written in Egyptian Hieroglyphs with the sign that is conventionally transcribed as "s". Finally, it is believed among scholars that Indo-European diphthongs *oi and *ou changed to Hittite "ē" and "ū", respectively, unless an alveolar consonant followed them, one of which is /š/, which reinforces the idea that it was alveolar in Hittite.

It can be held with certainty that /ḫ/ was a form of fricative, but its place of articulation is not so well understood. There is some evidence that may point towards a uvular/velar place of articulation. In Akkadian, the signs for "ḫ" had a velar place of articulation, and the sound was always voiceless. Furthermore, Ugaritic borrowings from Hittite commonly transcribe "ḫ" as "ġ", which stands for a voiced velar fricative (e.g., dġṯ < duḫḫuiš, tdġl < ^{m}Tudḫaliya, trġnds< ^{URU}Tarḫuntašša). However, it has also occasionally been transcribed as a voiceless pharyngeal fricative ("ḥtṯ < ḫattuš"). Some scholars have interpreted it as a velar fricative. Nonetheless, neither language could distinguish velar from uvular fricatives. Other scholars have suggested that the Ugaritic evidence may show that "ḫ" represented more than one phoneme.

Known to descend from Proto-Indo-European "*h₂", "ḫ" is believed to descend from "*h₃" as well according to the laryngeal theory. In Proto-Indo-European, "*h₂" is known for coloring *e to *a. It has also been shown that "ḫ" colors neighboring /u/ to /ɔ/. Its coloring qualities in Hittite and Proto-Indo-European suggest a uvular place of articulation since uvular consonants are usually incompatible with advanced tongue root since they cause retraction of adjacent vowels. Moreover, a velar place of articulation could be dismissed since they do not typically color vowels but are instead more commonly influenced by vowels. Similarly, that evidence precludes the possibility of "ḫ" being a pharyngeal fricative, which usually triggers the fronting, rather than retraction, of vowels (e.g., Proto-Semitic *ḥarāṯum > Akkadian erēšum).

The natural outcome of "*h₂" is a geminate "ḫḫ", indicating a voiceless manner of articulation. Nevertheless, the scholars who support the fortis/lenis framework usually interpret it as a fortis consonant. Notably, it is also subject to Eichner's voicing rules. In other words, if a voiceless "ḫ" occurred intervocalic position between two unaccented syllables or after a long accented syllable, it would be regularly voiced. Therefore, a phonemic distinction between "ḫḫ" and "ḫ" can be observed in the Hittite lexicon, just like in the stop system. Eichner's voicing law has also been observed in other Anatolian languages like Lycian (compare the verbal desinence Hittite -ḫḫaḫari and Lycian -χagã).

=== Labialization ===
Hittite had four labialized obstruents: two velar plosives and two uvular fricatives.

Labialized velars are known to have developed from the Proto-Indo-European labiovelars. A classic example is the Proto-Indo-European root verb "*h₁égʷʰti ~ *h₁gʷʰénti" > "ekuzi ~ akuanzi". The idea that Hittite preserved Indo-European labiovelars as labialized velars instead of a velar + w, like in other centum languages, is supported by various anomalies in verbal roots containing labialized obstruents. For example, the first-person singular aorist of ekuzi "to drink" is "e-ku-un - [ɛ́kʷɔn]". However, if the "u" is vocalic, the expected *e-ku-nu-un occurs, as in Hittite vocalic stemmed verbs. That view is also strengthened by the first-person plural present form "a-ku-e-ni - [akʷwɛ́ni]", instead of the expected *a-ku-me-ni, as in Hittite true verbal u-stems.

It has also been noted that it can be written as "e-uk-zi - [ɛ́kʷt͡si]", which has been pointed out as an argument for assuming labialization as well, in which case the rounding happened at the same time as the plosive instead of following it as a semivowel. The phenomena have also been attested in other verbs such as tarukzi/tarkuzi "he/she dances".

Similar observations can be made about the verb taruḫḫu- [tr̩χʷ-] "to overpower". Like the verb "eku-", "taruḫḫu-" also has an irregular first-person aorist for an u-stem noun (ta-ru-uḫ-ḫu-un instead of *ta-ru-uḫ-ḫu-un-un) and an irregular first person-plural aorist (tar-ḫu-u-en instead of *tar-uḫ-me-en). That would suggest that the Proto-Indo-European sequence "h₂u̯" became Hittite ḫu-u [χʷ]. Evidence of laryngeal labialization has been found outside Hittite: Lycian has Trqqñt- "Stormgod" < tr̥h₂u̯ént- "powerful", the "q" most likely representing a labialized velar plosive descending from the Proto-Indo-European segmental sequence "h₂u̯". Therefore, some scholars have regarded it to be an Anatolian feature, not exclusive to Hittite.

== Vowels ==
	Front	Central	Back
Close	i, iː	(ɨ)	u, uː
Open-mid	ɛ, ɛː		ɔ, ɔː
Open		a, aː	

It was debated by scholars whether Hittite had a vowel phoneme /ɔ(ː )/, distinct from the vowel /u(ː )/. The idea that the sign "u" stood for /ɔ(ː )/ and "ú" for /u(ː )/ was first proposed by Weidner since such a practice was paralleled in Hurrian and Akkadian. It received mainstream support only when Kloekhorst published in 2008 a detailed analysis of the distribution of both signs and found significant evidence for their being contrastive.

=== Plene spelling ===
Plene spelling is the practice of writing a vowel redundantly. Its use was never consistent at any stage of Hittite, but it was generally more common in earlier texts. It certainly must have represented some phonemic features, most obviously vowel length, as in ne-e-pí-iš, which should be analyzed phonetically as [nɛ́ːbis]. It has been argued that it could represent stress as well, though it certainly did not always denote stress: Words such as la-a-ḫu-wa-a-i could not have been accented in multiple places.

== See also ==
- Hittite language
- Hittite cuneiform
- Hittite grammar
- Hittitology
- Anatolian languages
- Bedřich Hrozný
- Harry Hoffner
- Craig Melchert
- Alwin Kloekhorst
- Laryngeal theory

== Sources ==
- Hoffner, Harry A. (1964). "An Anatolian Cult Term in Ugaritic". Journal of Near Eastern Studies. 23 (1): 66–68. doi:10.1086/371758. S2CID 161234939.
- Hoffner, Harry A.; Melchert, H. Craig (2008). A Grammar of the Hittite Language. Winona: Eisenbrauns. p. 38. ISBN 978-1-57506-119-1.
- Gardiner, Alan (1957). Egyptian Grammar (3rd ed.). London: Oxford University Press.
- Huehnergard, J. (2011). A grammar of Akkadian (3rd ed.). Winona Lake, IN: Eisenbrauns.
- Kimball, Sara E. (1999). Hittite historical phonology. Universität Innsbruck. Institut für Sprachwissenschaft.
- Kimball, Sara E. (1994). The IE short diphthongs *oi, *ai, *ou and *au in Hittite.
- Kloekhorst, Alwin (2008). Etymological Dictionary of the Hittite Inherited Lexicon. Leiden Indo-European Etymological Dictionary Series. Leiden, Boston: Brill. ISBN 978-90-04-16092-7.
- Maddieson, Ian (1984). Patterns of sound. Cambridge University Press.
- Melchert, H. Craig (1994). Anatolian Historical Phonology. Amsterdam: Rodopi. ISBN 9789051836974.
- Melchert, H. Craig (2013). Anatolian Historical Grammar (PDF). Prague: Charles University. ISBN 9789051836974.
- Melchert, H. Craig (2015). "Hittite Historical Phonology after 100 Years (and after 20 years)". Hrozny and Hittite: The First Hundred Years (PDF).
- Ringe, Don (2006). From Proto-Indo-European to Proto-Germanic (PDF). A Linguistic History of English (1st ed.). New York City: Oxford University Press. ISBN 978-0-19-928413-9. OCLC 64554645. OL 7405151M. Wikidata Q131605459.
- Stroud, Kevin (August 2013). "Episode 5: Centum, Satem and the Letter C | The History of English Podcast". The History of English Podcast. Archived from the original on 24 August 2013.
- Tropper, Josef (2000). Ugaritische Grammatik. Alter Orient und Altes Testament 273. Münster: Ugarit-Verlag.
- Vaux, Bert (1999). "A Note on Pharyngeal Features". Harvard Working Papers in Linguistics.
- Weidner, Ernst (1917). Studien zur hethitischen Sprachwissenschaft. Leipziger semitistische Studien; Bd. 7, Heft 1-2. (in German). Leipzig.
- Yoshida, Kazuhiko (2001). Wilhelm, G. (ed.). "Hittite nu-za and Related Spellings". Akten des IV. Internationalen Kongresses für Hethitologie. No. 45.
