= Hittite grammar =

Grammar of the Hittite language

The grammar of the Hittite language has a highly conservative verbal system and rich nominal declension. The language is attested in cuneiform, and is the earliest attested Indo-European language.

== Noun and adjective declension ==
=== Gender system and cases ===
Hittite distinguishes between two genders, common (animate) and neuter (inanimate). The distinction between genders is fairly rudimentary since it is made only in the nominative and accusative case, and the same noun is sometimes attested in both genders. It is still debated whether or not this reflects a prehistoric merger of inherited PIE masculine and feminine into a single common/animate gender or an archaic system in which there was already a common gender. Nouns referred to living beings (humans, animals and Gods) are usually found in the common/animate gender, but some inanimate objects actually have the common/animate gender. For instance, nouns in a-stem and t-stem are common/animate and, given how productive was the formation of words in the a-stem and t-stem, many words in Hittite indicating inanimate objects are actually in the common/animate gender in the nominative and accusative. The other gender, the neuter/inanimate, is referred to objects, including parts of the body, and abstract concepts or collective nouns, e.g. "family, assembly, troops, humanity". Some common examples of neuter declension are the u-stem nouns and the nouns formed by the suffixes -ātar, -eššar and the suffix for collective nouns -a(i)-. Words derived by common/animate gender roots through neuter suffixes are neuter.

The only reference to a female gender, which however does not erase the two-gender system "common-neuter gender", is the infix -(š)šara-, used to indicate female gender for humans and deities.

The nominal system consists of the following 9 cases: nominative, vocative, accusative, genitive, dative-locative, ablative, ergative, allative, and instrumental.

- The nominative marks the subject of a sentence or the predicate nominative (e.g., "I am a man").
- The genitive marks the possessor, the material of an object (e.g., "A sword <made> of iron"), the content of an object (e.g., "A vessel <full> of wine"), the object of an action (e.g., "The destruction of the city") and a partitive construction (a part of a whole); the last four usages are called "genitive of material", "genitive of contents", "objective genitive" and "partitive genitive". The genitive case is also used with postpositions in OH (in NH, a case shift happened from genitive to dative-locative except in the postposition iwar, "in the manner of").
- The dative-locative is used to mark the indirect object and the static position/location. It also mark a position/location with motion verbs (e.g., "I pour wine into the glass"). In Hittite, it is also used in some fixed temporal expression, e.g., "at night, in Winter".
- The accusative marks the direct object of a transitive verb (e.g., "I eat the apple"); in causative constructions (e.g., "He makes his ox cross the river"), a double accusative is found. Double accusative in Hittite is also used in the sentence "make something into something else" (e.g., "I refuse to make him my husband") and, from this expression, double accusative was used in the later coined structure "Treat somebody/something like..." (e.g., "I treated them like mothers and fathers"). To conclude, accusative in Hittite marks the time extent/duration, e.g. "I had reigned for ten years".
- The vocative is used in invocations (exclamations containing a direct address to humans or deities during a prayer or ritual).
- The allative (also known as "directive" and "terminative") is used to indicate the motion to or toward/in direction of a place. Verbs are always directive (e.g., "I go/come/travel to Rome; I carry the merchandize to Rome") and never stative (e.g., "I am in Rome") and describe the act of walking/perambulating. By contrast, a verb like "pour" has a direction but it's not a perambulatory movement. Sometimes, the allative is substituted by the accusative, which is called "accusative of direction" in this context.
- By contrast, the ablative is used to mark motion from a place or a beginning point in time (e.g., from now on). It is also used to mark movement through a place or object (e.g., "I get inside the house through the window"). This kind of ablative is called "perlative ablative". In NH, the ablative was then used to mark the agent of an action in passive constructions (e.g., "The city was destroyed by the king") instead of the instrumental case.
- The instrumental marks the (concrete or abstract/intangible) tool through which an action is performed in OH; as in many other Indo-European languages (e.g., balto-slavic languages), it also has a sociative/comitative meaning, i.e., it marks the person an action is performed with. It also expresses the cause of an action and, in OH, it marks the agent of an action in passive constructions. In NH, the instrumental was substituted by the ablative, as in Latin.

The Hittite declension system also distinguishes between two numbers (singular and plural) and shows indirect traces of a dual number; due to syncretism, the ending of ablative and instrumental in the plural coincide.

Hittite uses split ergativity: when a common/animate noun is the subject of a transitive verb, e.g., "The child eats the apple", the subject is marked by the nominative case. By contrast, when a neuter noun is the subject of a transitive verb, e.g., "The spear kills the soldier", the subject of the sentence is marked by the ergative case; hence, only neuter nouns show the ergative case in their declension, which means that common/animate nouns show 8 cases, while neuter nouns show 9 cases. Inflected adjectives always have the ergative case in their declension, but this case is used only when an adjective is referred to a neuter noun in the ergative case, i.e., followed by a transitive verb; consequently, adjectival declension shows 9 cases. Personal pronouns as the subject are always in the nominative case; the subject of an intransitive verb always take the nominative ending as well.

=== a-stem declension in Old Hittite (OH) ===
The basic scheme of suffixation is given in the table below, which is valid for almost all nouns and adjectives. The example a-stem word shown is antuḫšaš "man", which has no ergative case due to it being the common/animate gender. The letter "š" is always pronounced as /s/, while "z" is always pronounced /ts/ and derives from an ancient */ti/ or */tj/. For instance, in mi-verb declension, the 3rd person singular ending in the present tense -zi according to Hoffner and Melchert comes from an earlier *-ti.

	Singular	Plural
Nominative	-aš	-eš; -a (n.)
Ergative	-anz(a) (n)	-antēš (n)
Vocative	-a	- -
Accusative	-(a)n; -∅ (n)	-uš (c.); -a (n.)
Genitive	-aš	-an > -aš (later); -aš (n.)
Dative-locative	-i; -ya	-aš
Ablative	-az, -za; -az(a) (later)	-az(a), -za
Allative	-a	- -
Instrumental	-it, -et	-it, -et

Given that the nominal root ends with the thematic vowel -a and some suffixes starts in a vowel, the final -a in the root is elided (e.g., attaš, "father" > dat-loc. atti, not *attai). Only in some rare instances that represent an innovation, a dat-loc. in -ai is found; some of these instances are foreign words and foreign names.

Neuter nouns in the accusative singular take -n only if the thematic vowel is -a-, e.g., yukan (plough). All the other neuter nouns take -a (sometimes indicated as the "zero-ending" -∅). As for the neuter accusative plural, names belonging to the common/animate gender take -uš, while names belonging to the neuter gender take -a. Only names in i-stem take the dative-locative in -ya. Vocative and allative case have no plural counterpart neither in Old Hittite (OH), nor in Middle Hittite (ME) and New Hittite (NE). As already stated, due to syncretism, the ending of ablative and instrumental in the plural coincide. The instrumental case has two possible endings (-it, -et) and, according to Hoffner (2008), -it is the oldest ending; it developed from an earlier ending -t through anaptyxis/ephentesis in environment of a preceding dental consonant. Some tracks of this presumed ending can be found in irregular instrumental endings, in names such as genu (knee) > genut, šākuwa (eye) > šākuwat.

In MH, two more plural suffixes were created for the nominative and accusative (nom. -eš, -uš, -aš; acc. -uš, -eš, -aš). Then, the allative and instrumental cases both merged with ablative -az(a). The use of old allative -a and old instrumental -it in NH are archaisms. In NH, all the three plural suffixes for nouns of common gender in the two strong cases (nominative and accusative) collapsed into -uš, with only some exceptions. In OH, the original suffix of the genitive plural is -an; then, a new suffix -aš was coined in Late OH and displaced -an in NH.

Adjectives in a-stem share the same endings of noun declension; their gender depends from the gender of the noun they refer to (common/animate or neuter).

=== Examples of noun declension (a-stem, OH) ===
- antuḫšaš (man), attaš (father), annaš (mother), išḫāš (lord), arunaš (sea), common/animate
- yukan (plough), pedan (place), ekan (ice), neuter

In the following examples, all forms not directly attested are put between brackets.

Case	Singular	Plural
Nom.	antuḫšaš, attaš, annaš, išḫāš, arunaš	antuḫšeš, attiēš, anniš (irr.), išḫeš
Erg.	- -	- -
Voc.	[*antūḫša], atta, [*anna], išḫā	- -
Acc.	antūḫšan, attan, annan, išḫān	antuḫšuš, attuš, ann(i)uš, išḫuš
Gen.	antuḫšaš, attaš, annaš, išḫāš	antuḫšan, attan, [*annan], išḫān > -aš
Dat-loc.	antuḫši, atti, anni, išḫī	antuḫšaš, addaš, [*annaš], išḫaš
Abl.	antuḫšaz(a), attaz(a), annaz(a), [*išḫāz(a)]	antuḫšaz(a), attaz(a), annaz(a), [*išḫāz(a)]
All.	antuḫša, atta, anna, išḫā	- -
Instr.	antuḫšit/et, [*attit/et, *annit/et, *išḫit/et]	antuḫšit/et, [*attit/et, *annit/et, *išḫit/et]

Case	Singular	Plural
Nom.	yukan, pedan, ekan	[*yuka, *peda, *eka]
Erg.	[*yukanz(a), *pedanz(a), *ekanz(a)] (n.)	[*yukantēš, *pedantēš, *ekantēš] (n.)
Voc.	[*yuka, *peda, *eka]	- -
Acc.	[*yukan, *pedan, *ekan]	[*yuka, *peda, *eka]
Gen.	yukaš, pedaš, ekaš	[*yukaš], pedaš, [*ekaš]
Dat-loc.	yuki, pedi, eki	[*yukaš], pedaš, [*ekaš]
Abl.	[*yukaz(a)], pedaz(a), [*ekaz(a)]	[*yukaz(a)], pedaz(a), [*ekaz(a)]
All.	[*yuka, peda, eka]	- -
Instr.	yukit/et, [*pedit/et, *ekit/et]	yukit/et, [*pedit/et, *ekit/et]

=== An example of adjective declension (a-stem, OH) ===
The adjective chosen is araḫzenaš, araḫzenan ("external"), inflected for both genders.

Case	Singular	Plural
Nom.	araḫzenaš, araḫzenan	araḫzeneš, araḫzena
Erg.	- -, [*araḫzenanz(a)]	- -, [*araḫzenantēš]
Voc.	[*araḫzena]	- -
Acc.	araḫzenan	[*araḫzenuš, *araḫzena]
Gen.	araḫzenaš	araḫzenaš
Dat-loc.	araḫzeni	[*araḫzenaš]
Abl.	araḫzenaz(a)	araḫzenaza
All.	araḫzena	- -
Instr.	[*araḫzenit/et]	[*araḫzenit/et]

== Syntax ==
Hittite is a head-final language, with subject-object-verb word order.

Hittite syntax shows one noteworthy feature that is typical of Anatolian languages: commonly, the beginning of a sentence or clause is composed of either a sentence-connecting particle or otherwise a fronted or topicalized form, and a "chain" of fixed-order clitics is then appended.

Yes-no questions were marked using prosodic features such as rising intonation. In writing, they were partially left unmarked: Scribes in Assyria and Babylonia who wrote Akkadian in cuneiform script (and later Hittites as well) sometimes indicated the interrogative intonation by a plene spelling of the vowel in the final syllable of the central word in the interrogative clause. Nevertheless, the use of this device in Hittite was rare and probably not codified.

== Verb conjugation ==
When compared with other early-attested Indo-European languages, such as Ancient Greek and Sanskrit, the verb system in Hittite is morphologically relatively uncomplicated. There are two general verbal classes according to which verbs are inflected, the mi-conjugation and the ḫi-conjugation. The names are drawn by the ending of the first person singular in the present tense. Rose (2006) lists 132 ḫi-verbs and interprets the ḫi-mi oppositions as vestiges of a system of grammatical voice ("centripetal voice" vs. "centrifugal voice").

- mi-conjugation verbs are divided into vowel-stem verbs (verbs whose root ends in a vowel) and consonant-stem verbs; the latter category includes both verbs with bare roots and verbs ending with infixes and suffixes added to the root, e.g., -nin- and -ešš-.
- ḫi-conjugation verbs often have a consonantal root; most roots ends either in a single consonant, either non-geminated or geminated. Some verbs have an a-stem or i-stem root. Part of the a-stem model of conjugation was then generalized to part of the i-stem conjugation; this new model of conjugation is called 'mixed inflection'.

There are two voices (active and medio-passive), two moods (indicative and imperative), two aspects (perfective and imperfective), and two tenses (present for the present and future time and preterite for the past time); the difference between the present and the future can be disambiguated through an analytical construction. Additionally, the verbal system displays two infinitive forms, one verbal substantive, a supine and a participle.

Modality (e.g. "could, would, should, must") is conveyed in Hittite through modal particles and adverbs instead of modal verbs. Both verb class have some verbs that contain ablauting vowels according to fixed patterns.

The basic conjugational endings are as follows:

Hittite Conjugation
	Active		Mediopassive
	mi-conj.	ḫi-conj.	Mediopassive
Indicative Present-Future
Sg. 1	-mi	-ḫi, -ḫe	-ḫaḫari (-ḫari, -ḫa)
2	-ši	-ti	-ta(ti)
3	-zi	-i	-(t)a(ri)
Pl. 1	-weni; -meni		-wašta(ti)
2	-teni		-duma(ri)
3	-anzi		-anta(ri)
Indicative Preterite
Sg. 1	-(n)un	-ḫun	-(ḫa)ḫat(i)
2	-š; -t	-ta (-šta), -t	-at, -ta, -tat(i)
3	-t(a)	-š (-ta, -šta)	-at(i), -ta, -tat(i)
Pl. 1	-wen; -men		-waštat
2	-ten		-dumat
3	-er; -ar (rare)		-antat(i)
Imperative
Sg. 1	-(a)llu	-allu	-(ḫa)ḫaru
2	-∅ (-i, -t)	-∅ (-i)	-ḫut(i)
3	-tu; -du (later)	-u	-(t)aru
Pl. 1	-weni (-wani)		-waštati
2	-ten		-dumat(i)
3	-andu		-antaru

The ending -meni in the present tense is confined to nu-causative verbs; the ending -weni is identical in the present and imperative tense, thus the context helps disambiguating between the two tenses. In the preterite, -un is used with vocalic stem, i.e., a verbal root that ends in a vowel, which is then deleted. In the preterite, the ending -šta for 2nd person singular is used in a specific group of verbs, while the ending in -t is used in i-stem verbs; the ending -ta in the 3rd person singular is used in the i-stem verbs too.

In the imperative, the ending in -t is used in nu-causative verbs.

Nonfinite Verbal Forms
Set	Verbal substantive	Infinitive	Supine	Participle
Ia	-war (gen. -waš)	-wanzi	-wan	-ant-
Ib	-mar (gen. -maš)	-manzi	-wan	-ant-
II	-ātar (gen. -annaš)	-anna	-wan	-ant-

The infinitive -wanzi comes from a pre-Hittite locative in *-wenti or *-wonti showing vowel mutations and *-ti > -zi mutation; the supine -wan comes from a pre-Hittite locative without the final part of the ending, *-wen or *-won.

The Set I endings are default; the Set II endings are taken primarily by monosyllabic ablauting mi-verbs. Within Set I verbs, the Ib endings are taken by stems ending in -u.

A simple example of conjugation in the present tense is ḫarzi ('to have, to hold'); the verb belongs to the mi-conjugation verb class and is non-ablauting:

Person	Singular	Plural
1st	ḫarmi	ḫarueni
2nd	ḫarši	ḫartenī
3rd	ḫarzi	ḫarkanzi

=== Stress placement ===
Hittite radical verbs, that being verbs formed via the affixation of the inflectional endings directly to the root, are sometimes marked by a mobile stress pattern wherein stress is applied to the root in the singular and to the suffix in the plural. For instance, according to the linguist Anthony Yates, the Hittite mi-verb šešzi was perhaps realized as [séːs- t͡si] in the third-person singular non-past active, whereas its third-person plural form šašanzi was potentially realized as [sas-ánt͡si]. Likewise, the hi-conjugation verb kānki was perhaps realized as [káːnkː-i] in the third-person singular, and the third-person plural form kankanzi may have been realized as [kankː-ánt͡si]. However, other radical verbs display a type of fixed accent, such as anši, which was perhaps realized as [áːns-i] in the third-person singular, whereas the third-person plural form anšanzi was perhaps realized as [áːns-ant͡si].

According to Yates, synchronically, within Hittite, certain roots were inherently stressed whereas others lacked stress by default. When naturally unaccented roots such as /ses/ were affixed with the likewise unstressed singular inflectional endings, the accent fell upon the leftmost syllable (i.e. the root). However, when these same unaccented roots were affixed with the naturally stressed plural forms, the accent was retained in the inflectional endings. In the case of roots with fixed accents, such as /wék-/, due to a phonotactic prohibition against words with multiple stress placements, their interaction with the fixed-accent plural endings required the deletion of one stress marker. Ultimately, according to Yates, in such a scenario, the accent was preserved on the leftmost syllable, thus explaining the fixed-accent pattern for certain radical verbs. When an unstressed root was modified with an affixed marked by a fixed accent, such as /–skːé–/, the stress always remained on the suffix. The interaction between the underlying accent in the suffix and plural endings was resolved via the leftward shift of the stress towards the affix. If these same affixes were applied to inherently stressed roots, the accent always shifted leftwards. Thus, the root /wék-/, when combined with the affix /–skːé–/ and the ending /t͡si/, produced the form wekiškizzi (wéːkiskːit͡si).

=== Stem ablaut ===
The ablauting Hittite mi-verbs were inherited from the Proto-Indo-European root present and aorist, both of which display *e ~ ∅ ablaut in the root. This original PIE ablaut paradigm yielded several different patterns of vowel gradation in Hittite:

1. e ~ ∅ ablaut, appears in verbs inherited from PIE roots of the shape *CweC-, *Cmen- or *Ceh₁-. Examples of this pattern include the verbs kuen-^{zi} ~ kun- ("to kill") and ḫuiš-^{zi} ~ ḫuš- ("to live").
2. a ~ ∅ ablaut, appears in verbs where the original *e-vowel was altered to a by a laryngeal or due to the Hittite sound change of the PIE sequence *eRCC > aRCC. Examples of this pattern include ḫā-^{zi} ~ ḫ- ("to believe") and ma-^{zi} ~ m- ("to disappear").
3. e ~ ɨ, appears in only two attested verbs in the Hittite language: uekk-^{zi} ("to wish"") and terepp-^{zi} ("to plough").
4. e ~ a ablaut, appears in verbs derived from PIE roots of the shape *CeR-. According to the linguist Alwin Kloekhorst, the zero-grade of such PIE roots, which would be of the shape *CR-, yielded a Hittite sequence that, although phonologically also *CR-, was orthographically transcribed as CaR-. Essentially, this type is phonologically equivalent to the aforementioned e ~ ∅ ablaut, though an empty a-vowel was transcribed orthographically to represent initial consonant clusters. For instance, the form ma-ra-an-du ("they must disappear") perhaps phonologically represents underlying /mrántu/, inherited from PIE *m̥réntu. Certain verbs that display this time of ablaut, such as e-ez-za-az-zi ("to eat") derive from PIE roots of the shape *h₁eC-, in which case the orthographic a could be construed as the regular reflex of PIE *h₁C-. However, Kloekhorst argues that such a development would be irregular, since the initial laryngeal in a PIE sequence *h₁C- was otherwise lost in Hittite. As a consequence of this same sound change, a PIE root of the shape *h₁eC- would have yielded an irregular Hittite ablaut sequence **/ʔeC-/ ~ /C/, which—according to Kloekhorst—would have been regularized into /ʔeC-/ ~ /ʔC/ in accordance with the other mi-verbs. Thus, in these cases, the orthographic a is still an empty vowel irreflective of the underlying pronunciation of the term. In general, verbs demonstrating this ablaut type preserve the e-vowel in the present singular, the aorist singular and plural, the imperative second and third-person singular and the second-person plural, and in the non-finite forms of set I verbs, whereas the a-vowel most usually appears elsewhere in the paradigm. However, this principle is not universal, and certain verbs may varyingly display either the e or a vowel in the same form. For instance, the verb ekuzi ("to drink"), is attested with the first-person plural form written both as akueni and ekueni.
5. a ~ a ablaut, possibly appears in verbs derived from PIE roots of the shape *CeRC-. According to Kloekhorst, due the shift of PIE *eRCC into Hittite aRCC, the central vowel in verbs belonging to roots of the shape *CeRC- would have developed into Hittite a. However, the zero-grade forms of these PIE roots, which would take the shape *CRC-, would have developed into Hittite /CRC/, [CəRC], which would itself be orthographically transcribed as CaRC-. Thus, in Hittite writing, both the strong and weak stem appear identical, and therefore the synchronic existence of this ablaut type in Hittite is largely unprovable. Kloekhorst does, however, consider the example of the verb ārš-^{zi} ~ arš- ("to flow") to constitute strong evidence supporting the existence of this type of ablaut variation. According to Kloekhorst, the difference in spelling between these forms implies that ārš-^{zi} orthographically rendered phonetic /ʔars-/, whereas the weak stem arš- represents /ʔrs-/.

There are examples of various radical mi-verbs that lack synchronic ablaut, though they may historically derive from originally ablauting paradigms. In certain cases, one ablaut grade was generalized to the entire term paradigm. For instance, Kloekhorst argues that the non-ablauting verbs ānš-^{zi} ("to wipe") and hane/išš-^{zi} ("to wipe") once formed a singular ablauting pair, itself reflective of Proto-Indo-European *h₂ómh₁-s-ey ~ h₂mh₁-s-énti. Other non-ablauting Hittite verbs probably emerged due to the action of sound laws rendering both the strong and weak stem of the Proto-Indo-European term identical. For example, both stems of the originally ablauting aorist léwk-t ~ *luk-ént would yield the Hittite form lukk-, which is reflected in the non-ablauting verb lu-uk-ta ("to set fire to"). Besides radical verbs, there are also non-ablauting terms formed via certain affixes, such as fientive suffix -ešš-, or the denominative suffix -ye/a-.

=== Basic negative adverbs ===
The negation adverb is natta ("not"); nāwi translates "not yet", while lē translates "don't...!" in orders and prohibitions ("imperatival negative"); lē can be used with the imperative or, in NH, with the present with an imperatival negative meaning. Another use of lē is the "categorical negative", an emphatic negation in an obvious context which can be translated as "certainly not", e.g., "A blind man certainly doesn't see, a deaf man certainly doesn't hear, a lame man certainly doesn't run".

Negative adverbs are usually put right before the verb, in pre-verbal position; in rhetorical questions and emphatic questions, natta put at the beginning of a sentence, before the subject (if expressed).

=== Copula ===
==== The verb "to be" in OH ====
The verb is conjugated in the present tense and belong to the mi-conjugation verbal class. In the first person plural, no *asweni or *esweni form is attested yet. The verb "to be" can be omitted in the present tense in sentences containing a predicate nominative (e.g., "I am a man"), thus creating a nominal sentence. Consequently, adjectives referred to the predicate nominative take the nominative case as well.

Person	Singular	Plural
1st	ēšmi	ešuwani (*asweni?)
2nd	ēšši	? (*ašteni?)
3rd	ēšzi	ašanzi

== Pronouns ==
=== Personal pronouns ===
Personal pronouns are inflected according to their case. They have an enclitic version as well, which can be used as a direct or indirect object (acc-dat). The third person has only the enclitical version and distinguishes between common/animate gender and neuter gender. The following table contains the nominative cases of all pronouns and the enclitic form (acc-dat).

Person	Singular	Plural
1st	ūk; -mu	wēš; anzāš (later); -naš
2nd	zik; zīk (rare); -ta	šumeš; šumāš (later); -šmaš
3rd (comm/an.)	-aš (nom.)	-e > -at (MH, NH) (nom.)
3rd (n.)	-at	-e > -at (MH, NH) (nom.)

=== Possessive pronouns ===
Possessive pronouns have an earlier enclitic version and a later full/analytical version placed before the noun. Possessive pronouns are inflected according to cases and take the gender of the noun they refer to. The following table shows the nominative form:

person	Singular	Plural
1st	-miš (comm/an.); -met (n.); ammel (analytic, NH)	-šummiš; -šummet; anzel
2nd	-tiš; -tet; tuel, tue (later)	-šmiš; -šmet; šumel
3rd (comm/an.)	-šiš; apel	-šmiš; -šmet; ?
3rd (n.)	-šet; apel	-šmiš; -šmet; ?

=== Demonstrative pronouns ===
Demonstrative pronouns are put before the noun; they are inflected according to the case and the gender of the noun they refer to. Hittite has a three-way system to indicate position: near to the speaker, near to the listener and far from both ("here-there-yonder").

The pronouns "this, that" in the nominative singular are kāš and apāš; their plural is kē (later kūš) and apē (later apūš). Their neuter counterparts are kī and apāt, plural kē and apē. Adverbs "here, there" (kā, apiya) are derived from demonstrative pronouns as well as kinun and apiya ("now, then/in the past").

== Numbers ==
Both ordinal and cardinal numbers in Hittite were often written with ciphers instead of syllables, which makes both the reconstruction of their pronunciation and their translation in context difficult. Hence, most number are indicated by the Arabic cipher and their ending, e.g. "one" in the nominative common/animate gender is known as "1-aš". Number "one" was reconstructed by Goedegebuure (2006) as *šia-. Numbers from one to four are declined in Hittite.

Number	Cardinal	Ordinal
1	*šia-aš (c.); šia-an (n.)	ḫantezzi(ya)- (declined)
2	2-uš; 2-e (Luwian tuwa)	dān
3	*ter-(i)eš; *ter-e (Lycian trei, Luwian tari)	teriyan, terin (syncopated)
4	mi-e-(ya-)wa-aš (c.)	4-an, 4-in (synch.)
5	5- (Luwian paⁿta)	5-an, 5-in (synch.)
6	6- (< PIE *swéḱs?)	?
7	7- (Luwian šaptam-)	?
8	8- (Lycian aitãta)	?
9	9- (Lycian nuntata), Luwian nuwa[n?]	?
10	10- (< PIE *déḱm̥?)	?

== Literature ==
=== Dictionaries ===
- Goetze, Albrecht (1954). Review of: Johannes Friedrich, Hethitisches Wörterbuch (Heidelberg: Winter). Language 30.401–405.
- Sturtevant, Edgar H. (1931). Hittite glossary: words of known or conjectured meaning, with Sumerian ideograms and Accadian words common in Hittite texts. Language, Vol. 7, No. 2, pp. 3–82., Language Monograph No. 9.
- Puhvel, Jaan (1984–). Hittite Etymological Dictionary. Berlin: Mouton.

=== Grammar ===
- Hoffner, Harry A.; Melchert, H. Craig (2008). A Grammar of the Hittite Language. Winona Lake, In.: Eisenbrauns. ISBN 978-1-57506-119-1.
- Hrozný, Friedrich (1917). Die Sprache der Hethiter, ihr Bau und ihre Zugehörigkeit zum indogermanischen Sprachstamm. Ein Entzifferungsversuch. Leipzig: J. C. Hinrichs'sche Buchhandlung.
- Jasanoff, Jay H. (2003). Hittite and the Indo-European Verb. Oxford: Oxford University Press. ISBN 0-19-924905-9.
- Luraghi, Silvia (1997). Hittite. Munich: Lincom Europa. ISBN 3-89586-076-X.
- Melchert, H. Craig (1994). Anatolian Historical Phonology. Amsterdam: Rodopi. ISBN 90-5183-697-X.
- Patri, Sylvain (2007). L'alignement syntaxique dans les langues indo-européennes d'Anatolie. Wiesbaden: Harrassowitz. ISBN 978-3-447-05612-0.
- Rose, S. R. (2006). The Hittite -hi/-mi conjugations. Innsbruck: Institut für Sprachen und Literaturen der Universität Innsbruck. ISBN 3-85124-704-3.
- Sturtevant, Edgar H. A. (1933, 1951). Comparative Grammar of the Hittite Language. Rev. ed. New Haven: Yale University Press, 1951. First edition: 1933.
- Sturtevant, Edgar H. A. (1940). The Indo-Hittite laryngeals. Baltimore: Linguistic Society of America.
- Watkins, Calvert (2004). "Hittite". The Cambridge Encyclopedia of the World's Ancient Languages: 551–575. ISBN 0-521-56256-2.
- Yakubovich, Ilya (2010). Sociolinguistics of the Luwian Language. Leiden: Brill.

=== Text editions ===
- Goetze, Albrecht & Edgar H. Sturtevant (1938). The Hittite Ritual of Tunnawi. New Haven: American Oriental Society.
- Sturtevant, Edgar H. A., & George Bechtel (1935). A Hittite Chrestomathy. Baltimore: Linguistic Society of America.
- Knudtzon, J. A. (1902). Die Zwei Arzawa-Briefe: Die ältesten Urkunden in indogermanischer Sprache. Leipzig: Hinrichs.

=== Journal articles ===
- Hrozný, Bedřich (1915). "Die Lösung des hethitischen Problems". Mitteilungen der Deutschen Orient-Gesellschaft. 56: 17–50.
- Sturtevant, Edgar H. (1932). "The Development of the Stops in Hittite". Journal of the American Oriental Society. 52 (1). American Oriental Society: 1–12. doi:10.2307/593573. JSTOR 593573.
- Sturtevant, Edgar H. (1940). "Evidence for voicing in Hittite g". Language. 16 (2). Linguistic Society of America: 81–87. doi:10.2307/408942. JSTOR 408942.
- Wittmann, Henri (1969). "A note on the linguistic form of Hittite sheep". Revue hittite et asianique. 22: 117–118.
- Wittmann, Henri (1973) [1964]. "Some Hittite etymologies". Die Sprache. 10, 19: 144–148, 39–43.
- Wittmann, Henri (1969). "The development of K in Hittite". Glossa. 3: 22–26.
- Wittmann, Henri (1969). "A lexico-statistic inquiry into the diachrony of Hittite". Indogermanische Forschungen. 74: 1–10.
- Wittmann, Henri (1969). "The Indo-European drift and the position of Hittite". International Journal of American Linguistics. 35 (3): 266–268. doi:10.1086/465065. S2CID 106405518.
