= Johannes Friedrich (linguist) =

German linguist (1893–1972)

Karl Eduard Paul Johannes Friedrich (27 August 1893, in Leipzig-Schönefeld – 12 August 1972, in Berlin) was a German philologist, hittitologist and Assyriologist who was a professor at the University of Leipzig and later at the Free University of Berlin.

Friedrich was born in Leipzig where his father was a cartographer. He studied in Leipzig. He received his doctorate in 1916 under K. Brugmann and habilitated in 1924. He became an associate professor in 1929. In 1933 Friedrich signed the Vow of allegiance of the Professors of the German Universities and High-Schools to Adolf Hitler and the National Socialistic State. He became a professor of Near Eastern languages in 1936. He served in the Wehrmacht in 1944-45. He served as rector of Leipzig University in 1948-49. In 1950, difficulties in moving between east and west Germany forced him to move to the Free University of Berlin.

Friedrich published the Hethitisches Elementarbuch (1940), and the Kurzgefasstes Hethitisches Wörterbuch (1966), a dictionary of Hittite that he first produced in 1952. A translation of his book "Entzifferung Verschollener Schriften und Sprachen" ( "Extinct Languages" ) was published by Philosophical Library New York 1957: a study of Ancient Orient languages, including Egyptian hieroglyphics, cuneiform writing, Hittite hieroglyphics and other scripts and languages of the Old world. In 1931, he studied the "Urartian" or "Chaldian" inscription of Rusa I from Nor-Bajazet and deciphered the script in 1933. He later rejected the use of the term "Chaldian". He was a professor at the University of Leipzig.

He was a member of the Saxon Academy of Sciences, the German Archaeological Institute, and the German Oriental Society. He died in West Berlin.

== Writings ==
Friedrich's works include:

- (1931): Beiträge zu Grammatik und Lexikon des Chaldischen (1. Teil), Caucasica 7, 53–86.
- (1931): Beiträge zu Grammatik und Lexikon des Chaldischen (2. Teil), Caucasica 8, 114–150.
- (1931): Die Inschrift des urartäischen Königs Rusa I. aus Nor-Bajazet, Archiv orientální. 3, 257–271.
- (1931): Zur urartäischen Nominalflexion, Zeitschrift für Assyriologie und Vorderasiatische Archäologie 40, 264–288.
- (1933): Einführung ins Urartäische: Grammatischer Abriss und ausgewählte Texte mit sprachlichen Erläuterungen, Mitteilungen der Vorderasiatisch-Ägyptischen Gesellschaft 37/3,

Leipzig.

- (1935): Rez. zu C.F. Lehmann-Haupt, Corpus Inscriptionum Chaldicarum: 2. Lieferung, Berlin – Leipzig, 1935, OLZ 38, 425–433.
- (1936): Chalder oder Urartäer?, Zeitschrift der Deutschen Morgenländischen Gesellschaft 90, 60–82.
- (1937): Die urartäische Inschrift von Kolagran, Acta Jutlandica 9/1, 518–536.
- (1939–1941): Urartäische Inschriften im Museum von Tiflis, Archiv für Orientforschung 13, 237–239.
- (1954): Entzifferung verschollener Schriften und Sprachen, Berlin – Heidelberg.
- (1961): Decifrazione delle scritture e delle lingue scomparse, Florenz.
- (1968): Zwei Berichtigungen zum Urartäischen, Or. NS 37, 346.
