= Giedrė Šabasevičiūtė =

Lithuanian Islamologist

Academic background
- Education: B.A. in Ethnology (2004) B.A. in Arabic Language and Literature (2006); M.A. in Sociology (2008) PhD in Sociology (2015)

Giedrė Šabasevičiūtė is a Lithuanian sociologist, historian and Islamologist specializing in the intellectual past and present of Egypt.

Šabasevičiūtė holds a PhD degree in sociology from the School for Advanced Studies in the Social Sciences and is a research fellow at the Oriental Institute, ASCR. In 2022, she received the award of the Czech Academy of Sciences for her monograph Sayyid Qutb. An Intellectual Biography published by Syracuse University Press.

== Personal views ==
In 2021, Šabasevičiūtė signed a petition calling for the Boycott of Israel in the academia entitled "Palestine and Praxis: Open Letter and Call to Action".
