= Hattian =

Hattian may refer to:

- someone or something related to Hattians, an ancient people of Anatolia
  - Hattian language, an extinct language, spoken by the Hattians
- someone or something related to the land of Hatti, an ancient region in Anatolia
- Hattian Bala, a town in Azad Kashmir
  - Hattian Bala District, a districts in Azad Kashmir
- Hattian Dupatta, a town in Azad Kashmir
- Hattian Graham (b. 1973), a Barbadian cricketer

== See also ==
- Hattic (disambiguation)
- Hatti (disambiguation)
- Hattush (disambiguation)
- Hittite (disambiguation)
