= Hattusili =

Ḫattušili (Ḫattušiliš in the inflected nominative case) was the regnal name of three Hittite kings:

- Hattusili I (Labarna II)
- Hattusili II
- Hattusili III

It was also the name of two Neo-Hittite kings:

- Hattusili I (Kummuh)
- Hattusili II (Kummuh)

== See also ==
- Hattush (disambiguation)
