= Willemijn Waal =

Dutch Hittitologist and classicist

- Born: 1975 (age 50–51)
- Parent(s): Cees Waal; Iris Schuddebeurs

Willemijn J.I. Waal (born 1975) is a Dutch Hittitologist and Classicist. She is known especially for her work on Hittite administrative practice and the development of early scripts, including Luwian hieroglyphic and the Greek alphabet.

Having taught at various universities, including LMU Munich and the VU University Amsterdam, she currently is an associate professor at Leiden University. From January 2020 until September 2024 she was director of the Netherlands Institute for the Near East.

Waal received various grants for her research, including fellowships from Cambridge University's CREWS project, the Institute of Aegean Prehistory and the Swiss Foundation Luwian Studies. and, for her “From Aleph to Alpha” Project, a “vici” grant from the Netherlands Organisation for Scientific Research; the largest personal grant available in The Netherlands.

Her doctoral thesis was published in 2015 as Hittite Diplomatics: Studies in Ancient Document Format and Record Management.

She is co-editor, along with Jorrit M. Kelder, of From 'Lugal.Gal' to 'Wanax': kingship and political organisation in the Late Bronze Age Aegean, a work discussing Hittite evidence for the nature of Myceanaen Greek society.
