= Hattush (disambiguation) =

Hattush may refer to:

- Hattush or Hattusa, the ancient Hittite capital (in Turkey)
- Hattush, mentioned in Ezra 8 in the Hebrew Bible, one of the exiles who returned to Jerusalem with Ezra

== See also ==
- Hattusili (disambiguation)
- Hatti (disambiguation)
- Hattian (disambiguation)
- Hattic (disambiguation)
- Hittite (disambiguation)
