= Hatti =

Hatti may refer to

- Hatti (/ˈhæti/; Assyrian ^{URU}Ha-at-ti) in Bronze Age Anatolia:
  - the area of Hattusa, roughly delimited by the Halys bend
  - the Hattians of the 3rd and 2nd millennia BC
  - the Hittites of ca 1400–1200 BC
  - the areas to the west of the Euphrates controlled by Neo-Hittite kingdoms (1000–700 BC)
- Hattee, ethno-cultural community in India

== Places ==
- Hatti, Raichur, a settlement in the Raichur district of Karnataka, India
- Hatti, Davanagere, a settlement in the Davanagere district of Karnataka, India
- Hatti District, an administrative subdivision of Iran

== See also ==
- Hati (disambiguation)
- Hattian (disambiguation)
- Hattic (disambiguation)
- Hattie (disambiguation)
- Hattush (disambiguation)
- Hittite (disambiguation)
