= Hattie (disambiguation) =

Hattie is a feminine given name.

Hattie may also refer to:

- Hurricane Hattie, the strongest and deadliest tropical cyclone of the 1961 Atlantic hurricane season
- Typhoon Hattie (Oyang), in the 1990 Pacific hurricane season
- Hilo Hattie (1901-1979), Hawaiian singer, hula dancer, actress and comedian
- John Hattie (born 1950), New Zealand education researcher and author
- Hattie, Missouri, a ghost town
- Hattie, West Virginia, an unincorporated community
- Hattie Lake, Nova Scotia, Canada
- Hattie Lakes, Nova Scotia, Canada
- Hattie (film), a 2011 television film on the life of Hattie Jacques

== See also ==
- Hatti (disambiguation)
