= Oriental Institute (Prague) =

Research institution in Prague, Czech Republic

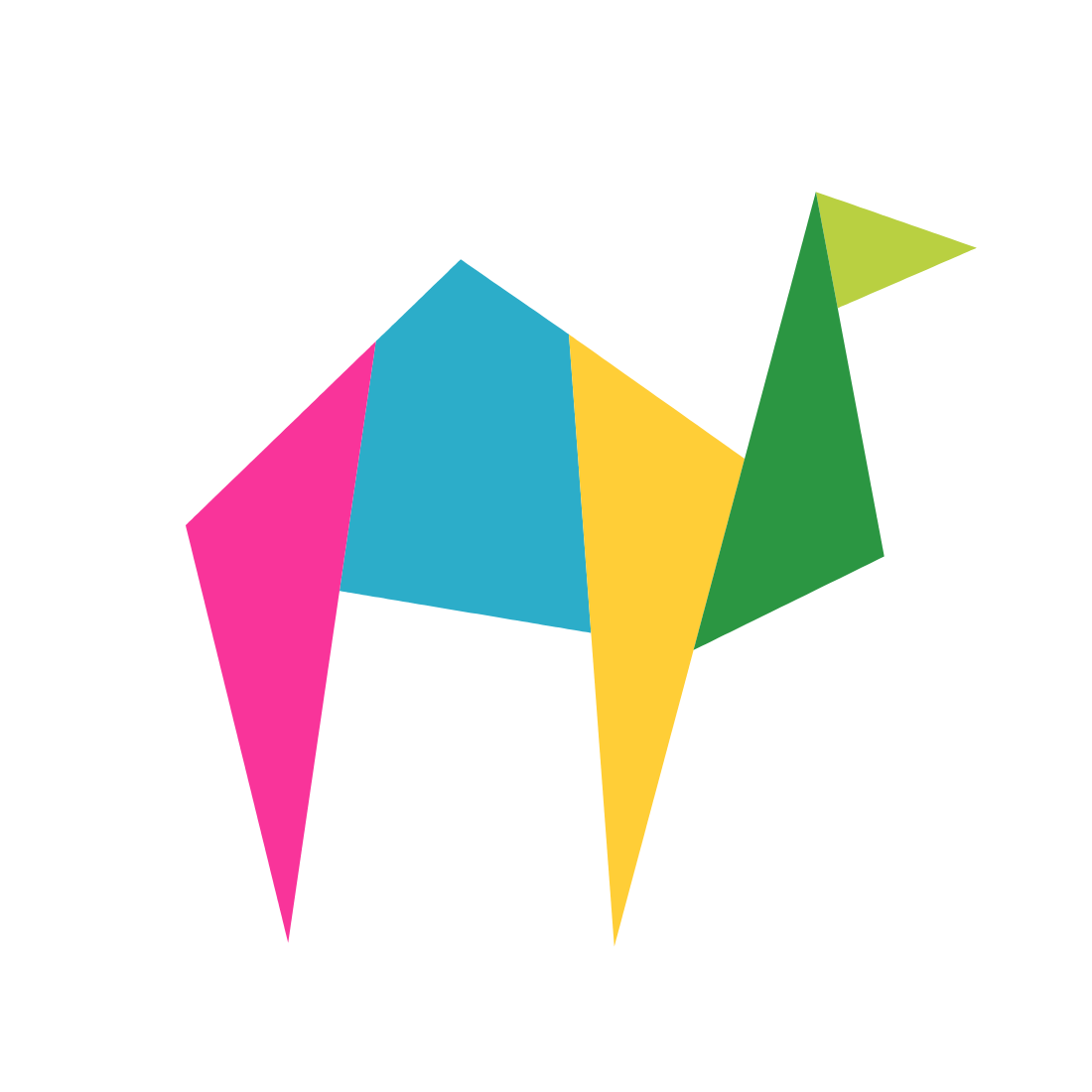
- Established: 1922
- Director: Táňa Dluhošová
- Key people: Sergio Alivernini (Dept. Head, Middle East), Pavel Hons (Dept. Head, South Asia), Bronislav Ostřanský (Deputy Director, Administration), Kevin L. Schwartz (Deputy Director, Research), Nobuko Toyosawa (Dept. Head, East Asia)
- Location: Prague, Czech Republic
- Coordinates: 50°7′22.08″N 14°28′11.97″E
- Interactive map of Oriental Institute
- Website: orient.cas.cz/en

The Oriental Institute of the Czech Academy of Sciences (Czech: Orientální ústav Akademie věd České republiky) is a research institution founded in 1922, specializing in the field of Oriental Studies. It is one of the oldest institutions dedicated to the study of Oriental cultures in Central and Eastern Europe. Since 1992, it has operated under the auspices of the Czech Academy of Sciences. The Oriental Institute collaborates with universities across Czechia for teaching and training purposes and organizes public events and lectures.

== History ==
The Oriental Institute of Prague was founded under Act No. 27/1922 passed by the Czechoslovak parliament on January 25, 1922. According to the act, the aim of the Institute was “to cultivate and build up scientific and economic relations with the Orient”. The establishment of the Institute was supported by the first Czechoslovak President T. G. Masaryk. On November 25, 1927, the President nominated the Institute's first 34 members. In 1929, the first issue of the scholarly journal Archiv Orientální appeared and, two years later, the Oriental Institute general library was opened. In 1952, the Oriental Institute was incorporated into the newly formed Czechoslovak Academy of Sciences. Forty years later, in 1992, shortly before the partition of Czechoslovakia, the Institute became a constituent part of the Academy of Sciences of the Czech Republic. Among the early scholars who contributed significantly to the establishment and development of the Oriental Institute were: Bedřich Hrozný (d. 1952), Alois Musil (d. 1944), Jan Rypka (d. 1968), and Moriz Winternitz (d. 1937). The Oriental Institute currently has a branch office in Taiwan in cooperation with the Institute of History and Philology of Academia Sinica.

== Research ==
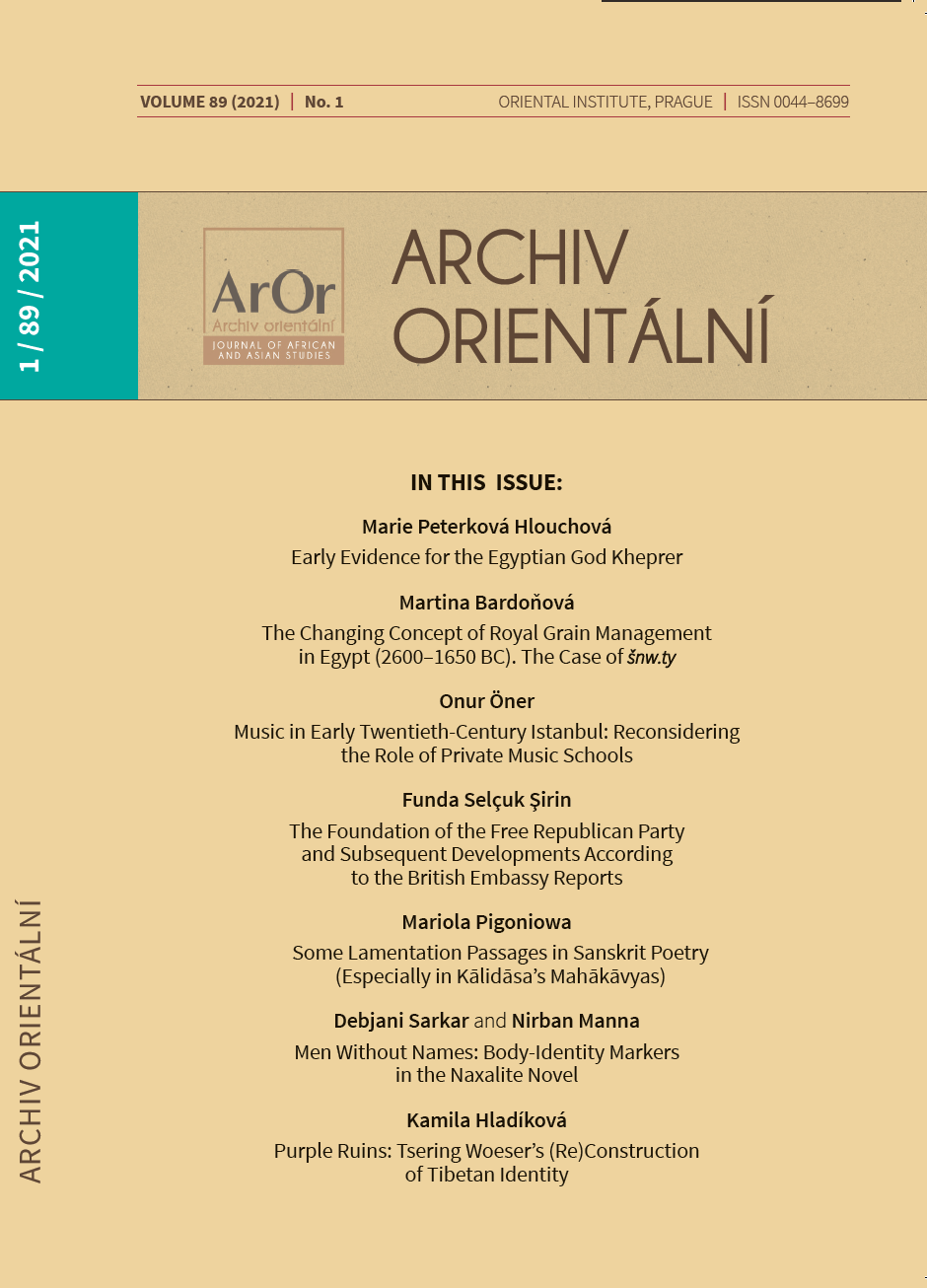
Archiv Orientální

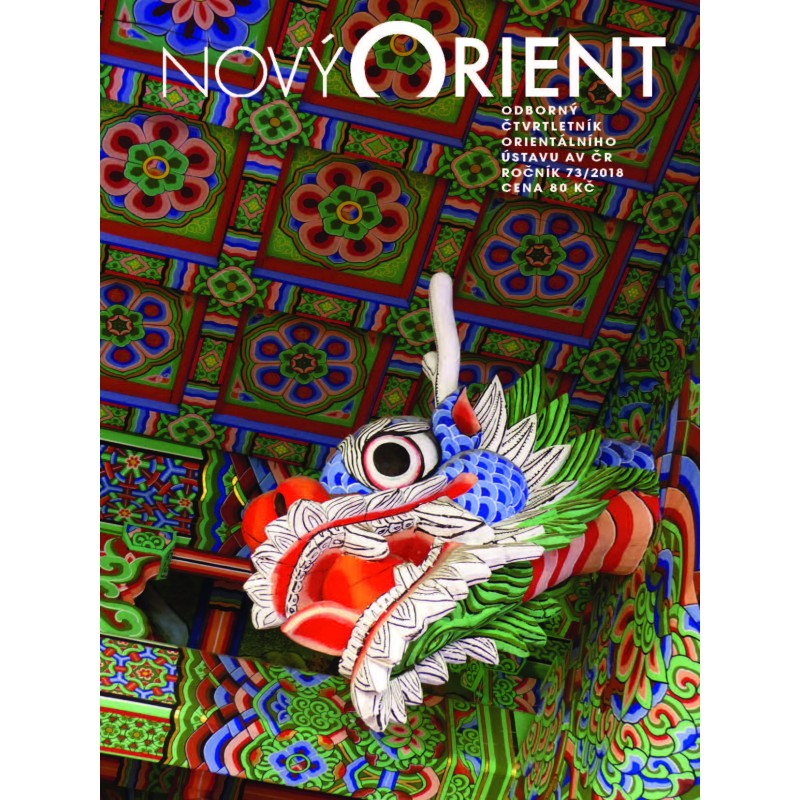
Nový Orient

The Oriental Institute is divided into three departments: Middle East, South Asia, and East Asia. Its researchers focus on the Arab world, Iran, Israel, Turkey, the Ottoman Empire, India, Southeast Asia, China, Japan, and the ancient Near East across multiple disciplines in the humanities and social sciences. Another important part of the Institute's research activities is the study of philosophies and religions of the Orient, namely Islam (in the context of recent and contemporary history of the Near East), Buddhism (in Southeast Asia, the Himalayan region, Tibet and Mongolia), Hinduism, Taoism and Confucianism, and of the religions of the Ancient Near East. The relevance of religions and religious beliefs to modern societies is also studied, including the interaction of religion and political ideologies (Islamic reformism, fundamentalism, Hindu nationalism and communalism, Buddhist and Islamic dimension of Southeast Asian politics).

Research of Asian and African languages focuses on quantitative linguistics, Chinese phonetics, and Hindi lexicography. Research in literature is done mainly in Hindi literature. Further research activities of the Institute include a study in theoretical and cultural foundations of the Traditional Chinese medicine, based on primary Chinese sources.

== Activities ==
The Institute publishes Archiv Orientální, a leading journal in the field of Oriental and African Studies, as well Nový Orient (New Orient), a Czech-language journal published three times a year and founded in 1945.
