= Hati =

Hati may refer to:

- Hati Hróðvitnisson, a wolf in Norse mythology
- Hati (moon), one of Saturn's moons
- Hati, Iran, a village in Khuzestan Province, Iran
- Hati District, an administrative subdivision of Khuzestan Province, Iran
- Hati Rural District, an administrative subdivision of Khuzestan, Iran
- Shin Hati, a fictional character in Star Wars

== See also ==
- Haiti, a country with a similar spelling
- Hatis, a village in Armenia
- Hatti (disambiguation)
