= Hattic =

Hattic may refer to:

- Hattians, an ancient people of Anatolia, Turkey
- Hattic language, an extinct language spoken in that region

== See also ==
- Hattian (disambiguation)
- Hatti (disambiguation)
- Hittite (disambiguation)
- Hattush (disambiguation)
