= Hittitology =

Study of Hittites

Hittitology is the study of the Hittites, an ancient Anatolian people that established an empire around Hattusa in the 2nd millennium BCE. It combines aspects of the archaeology, history, philology, and art history of the Hittite civilisation. There are two universities in Turkey with a Hittitology major studies besides some minors and chairs, one of Istanbul University and Ankara University.

A minor programme in Hittitology (B.A.) was founded around 2023 at Philipps-Marburg University in Germany.

== List of Hittitologists ==
A partial list of notable Hittite scholars includes:

- Selim Adalı
- Metin Alparslan
- Vladislav Ardzinba (1945–2010)
- Trevor R. Bryce (born 1940)
- Gary Beckman
- Jeanny Vorys Canby (1929–2007)
- Yaşar Coşkun
- Philo H. J. Houwink ten Cate ()
- Birgit Christiansen
- Billie Jean Collins
- Halet Çambel
- Petra Goedegebuure
- Albrecht Goetze (1897–1971)
- Oliver Gurney (1911–2001)
- Hans G. Güterbock (1908–2000)
- Harry A. Hoffner (1934–2015)
- Theo van den Hout
- Bedřich Hrozný (1879–1952)
- Sara Kimball
- Alwin Kloekhorst
- J. G. Macqueen
- Gregory McMahon
- Craig Melchert
- Jared L. Miller
- Alice Mouton
- Jaan Puhvel (1932–2026)
- Andreas Schachner
- Daniel Schwemer
- Itamar Singer (1946–2012)
- Edgar H. Sturtevant (1875–1952)
- Piotr Taracha
- Willemijn Waal
- Kazuhiko Yoshida
- Leonie Zuntz (1908–1942)
- Lord Edwin E. Hitti

== See also ==
- History of the Hittites
- Hittite language
- Hittite grammar
- Hittite phonology
- Assyriology
- Egyptology
