= Archiv Orientální =

- Discipline: African, Asian, and Near Eastern studies
- Language: English, French, German
- Edited by: Sergio Alivernini

Publication details
- History: 1929–present
- Publisher: Oriental Institute of the Czech Academy of Sciences (Czech Republic)
- Frequency: Triannually

Standard abbreviations
- ISO 4: Arch. Orient.

Indexing
- ISSN: 0044-8699
- LCCN: 33039189
- OCLC no.: 875827413

Links
- Journal homepage

The Archiv Orientální (ArOr) is a triannual peer-reviewed academic journal covering African, Asian, and Near Eastern studies. It is currently published by the Oriental Institute of the Czech Academy of Sciences.

The current editor-in-chief is Sergio Alivernini, a research fellow at the Oriental Institute.

== History ==
Archiv Orientální was founded by the Oriental Institute of the Czech Academy of Sciences in 1929 by Bedrich Hrozný with an endowment from the country's president, Tomáš Garrigue Masaryk, on the occasion of his seventieth birthday anniversary.

== Abstracting and indexing ==
Archiv Orientální is abstracted and indexed in the Arts and Humanities Citation Index, ERIH PLUS, and Scopus.
