= Hittite cuisine =

The Hittites, an Anatolian Indo-European people in Bronze Age West Asia, left a good number of texts detailing their preparation of food and many Hittite laws to stipulate how certain food is to be prepared, cooked, and served.

The main ingredients of Hittite cuisine were dairy products, meat, grain products, and other natural products such as honey. Hittites loved bread and had recipes for as many as 180 types of bread in different shapes and with varying ingredients.

Food eaten in Anatolia today is a continuation of the Hittite cuisine as stated in the book "Hittite Cuisine" published by Alpha Publishing (08-2008) in Turkey. Some cities have preserved Hittite food traditions. Adana, a major city in southeast Turkey (Adaniya in Hittite in the former Neo-Hittite, Luwian Kizzuwadna region) is famous for its kebabs, and according to studies Hittite cuisine contained a strong element of meat skewer (shish kebab). However, while Hittite recipes were generally similar to those of contemporary civilizations, especially in regard to meat and dairy dishes, they were unique with regard to the plants used in cooking, as Anatolia has its own specific vegetation.

Various books are written in Turkish about Hittite cuisine, and the Hittite University in Çorum in Turkey has published articles about Hittite cuisine.

Wine was consumed by the Hittites on a regular basis and used for religious festivals and rituals.

== Bibliography ==
- Hitit Mutfağı (Hittite Cuisine), Asuman Albayrak, Ahmet Uhri, Ülkü Menşure Solak, Metro Kultur Publishing (2008), ISBN 978-9944018814
