= Hittite cuneiform =

Ancient Mesopotamian script

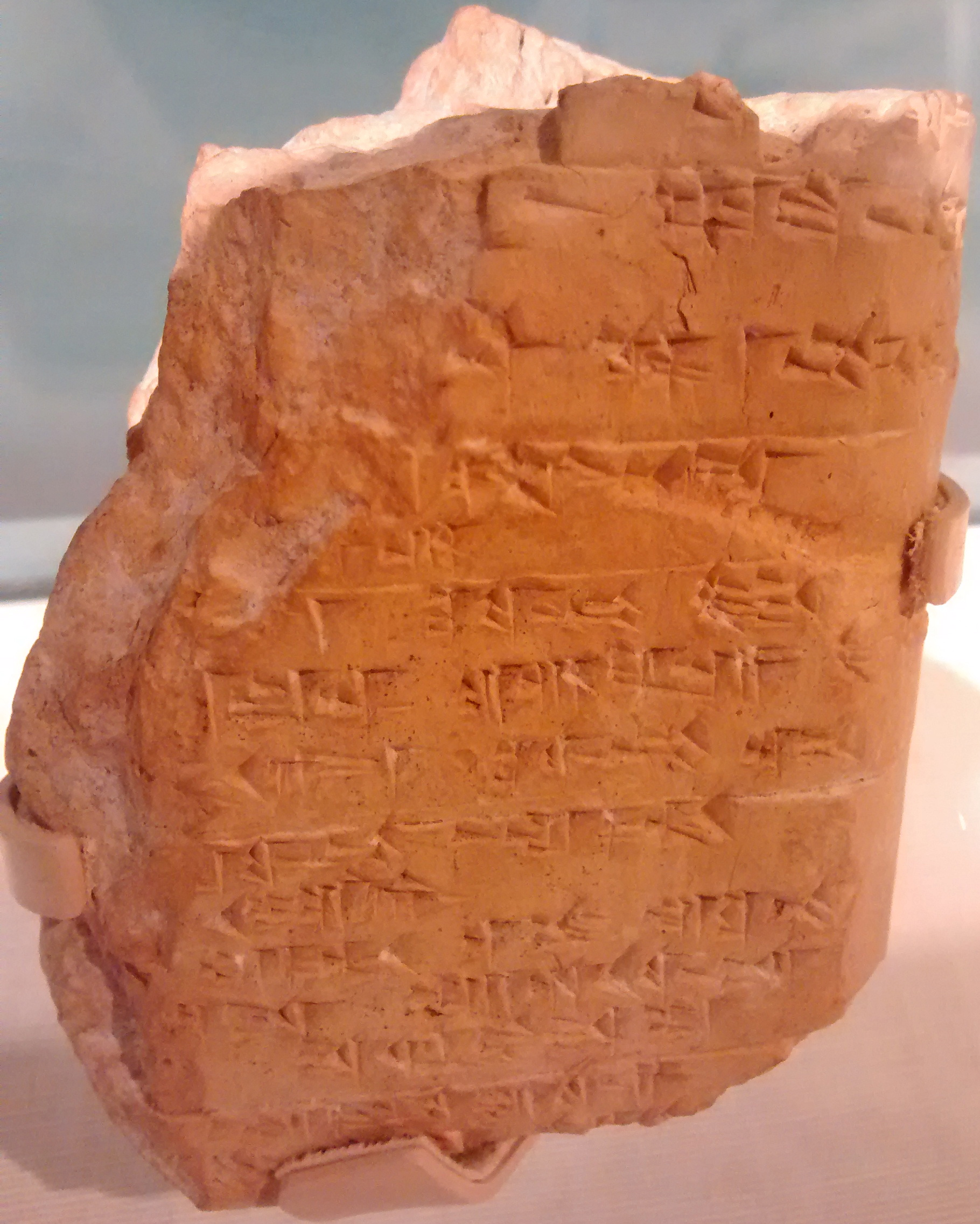
Hittite cuneiform on a tablet

Hittite cuneiform is the form of cuneiform script used in writing the Hittite language. The surviving corpus of Hittite texts is preserved in cuneiform on clay tablets dating to the 2nd millennium BC (roughly spanning the 17th to 12th centuries BC).

Hittite orthography was directly adapted from Old Babylonian cuneiform. As Harry A. Hoffner and Craig Melchert point out: "It is therefore generally assumed that Ḫattušili I (ca. 1650–1600), during his military campaigns in North Syria, captured scribes who were using a form of the late Old Babylonian syllabary, and these captives formed the nucleus of the first scribal academy at Ḫattuša." Alwin Kloekhorst, on the other hand, while affirming that Hittite cuneiform derives from Old Babylonian, casts doubt on the role of Ḫattušili I in its adoption, claiming that "the transfer of Syro-Babylonian scribal tradition into Asia Minor may have been a more gradual process that predates the Hittites occupation of Hattuša." What is presented below is Old Akkadian cuneiform, so most of the characters shown here are not, in fact, those used in Hittite texts. For examples of actual Hittite cuneiform, see The Hittite Grammar Homepage by Olivier Lauffenburger. The Hethitisches Zeichenlexikon ("Hittite Sign List" commonly referred to as HZL) by Christel Rüster and Erich Neu lists 375 cuneiform signs used in Hittite documents (11 of them only appearing in Hurrian and Hattic glosses), compared to some 600 signs in use in Old Assyrian. About half of the signs have syllabic values, the remaining are used as ideograms or logograms to represent the entire word—much as the characters "$", "%" and "&" are used in contemporary English.

Cuneiform signs can be employed in three functions: syllabograms, Akkadograms or Sumerograms. Syllabograms are characters that represent a syllable. Akkadograms and Sumerograms are ideograms originally from the earlier Akkadian or Sumerian orthography respectively, but not intended to be pronounced as in the original language; Sumerograms are mostly ideograms and determiners. Conventionally,

- Syllabograms are transcribed in italic lowercase
- Akkadograms in italic uppercase
- Sumerograms in regular uppercase.

Thus, the sign GI 𒄀 can be used (and transcribed) in three ways, as the Hittite syllable gi (also ge); in the Akkadian spelling QÈ-RU-UB of the preposition "near" as QÈ, and as the Sumerian ideogram GI for "tube" also in superscript, ^{GI}, when used as a determiner.

== Syllabary ==
The syllabary consists of single vowels, vowels preceded by a consonant (conventionally represented by the letters CV), vowels followed by a consonant (VC), or consonants in both locations (CVC). This system distinguishes the following consonants (notably dropping the Akkadian s series),

b, p, d, t, g, k, ḫ, r, l, m, n, š, z,

combined with the vowels a, e, i, u. Additional ya (=I.A 𒄿𒀀), wa (=PI 𒉿) and wi (=wi_{5}=GEŠTIN 𒃾 "wine") signs are introduced. The contrast of the Assyrian voiced/unvoiced series (k/g, p/b, t/d) is not used to express the voiced/unvoiced contrast in Hittite; they are used somewhat interchangeably in some words, while other words are spelled consistently. The contrast in these cases is not entirely clear, and several interpretations of the underlying phonology have been proposed.

Similarly, the purpose of inserting an additional vowel between syllabograms (often referred to as "plene writing" of vowels) is not clear. Examples of this practice include the -a- in iš-ḫa-a-aš "master" or in la-a-man "name", ú-i-da-a-ar "waters". In some cases, it may indicate an inherited long vowel (lāman, cognate to Latin nōmen; widār, cognate to Greek ὕδωρ húdōr), but it may also have other functions connected with 'word accentuation'.

Without the use of a specialized Hittite font, the Unicode cuneiform in the tables below is likely to be displayed using a font which is inaccurate for Hittite.

=== V ===
a 𒀀
e 𒂊
i 𒄿
u 𒌋, ú 𒌑

=== CV ===
	b-	p-	d-	t-	g-	k-	ḫ-	l-	m-	n-	r-	š-	w-	y-	z-
-a	ba 𒁀	pa 𒉺	da 𒁕	ta 𒋫	ga 𒂵	ka 𒅗	ḫa 𒄩	la 𒆷	ma 𒈠	na 𒈾	ra 𒊏	ša 𒊭	wa 𒉿	ya 𒅀	za 𒍝
-e	be 𒁁	pé, pí 𒁉	de, di 𒁲	te 𒋼	ge, gi 𒄀	ke, ki 𒆠	ḫe 𒄭, ḫé 𒃶	le, li 𒇷	me 𒈨, mé 𒈪	ne 𒉈, né 𒉌	re, ri 𒊑	še 𒊺			ze 𒍣, zé 𒍢
-i	bi 𒁉	pé, pí 𒁉	de, di 𒁲	ti 𒋾	ge, gi 𒄀	ke, ki 𒆠	ḫi 𒄭	le, li 𒇷	mi 𒈪	ni 𒉌	re, ri 𒊑	ši 𒅆	wi_{5} 𒃾		zi 𒍣
-u	bu, pu 𒁍		du 𒁺	tu 𒌅	gu 𒄖	ku 𒆪	ḫu 𒄷	lu 𒇻	mu 𒈬	nu 𒉡	ru 𒊒	šu 𒋗, šú 𒋙			zu 𒍪

=== VC ===
	-b	-p	-d	-t	-g	-k	-ḫ	-l	-m	-n	-r	-š	-z
a-	ab, ap 𒀊		ad, at 𒀜		ag, ak 𒀝		aḫ, eḫ, iḫ, uḫ 𒄴	al 𒀠	am 𒄠	an 𒀭	ar 𒅈	aš 𒀸	az 𒊍
e-	eb, ep, ib, ip 𒅁		ed, et, id, it 𒀉		eg, ek, ig, ik 𒅅		aḫ, eḫ, iḫ, uḫ 𒄴	el 𒂖	em, im 𒅎	en 𒂗	er, ir 𒅕	eš 𒌍, 𒐁	ez, iz 𒄑
i-	eb, ep, ib, ip 𒅁		ed, et, id, it 𒀉		eg, ek, ig, ik 𒅅		aḫ, eḫ, iḫ, uḫ 𒄴	il 𒅋	em, im 𒅎	in 𒅔	er, ir 𒅕	iš 𒅖	ez, iz 𒄑
u-	ub, up 𒌒		ud, ut 𒌓		ug, uk 𒊌		aḫ, eḫ, iḫ, uḫ 𒄴	ul 𒌌	um 𒌝	un 𒌦	ur 𒌨, úr 𒌫	uš 𒍑	uz 𒊻

=== CVC ===
		-b/-p	-d/-t	-g/-k	-ḫ	-l	-m	-n	-r	-š	-z
b-/p-	-a-		pád/t,píd/t 𒁁			p/bal 𒁄			pár/bar 𒈦 (=maš)	paš	
b-/p-	-i-		pád/t,píd/t 𒁁			p/bíl 𒉋 (=GIBIL "new")			pir	p/biš,pùš 𒄫 (=gir)	
b-/p-	-u-								p/bur	p/biš,pùš 𒄫 (=gir)	
d-/t-	-a-	tab/p,dáb/p 𒋰 (=TAB "2")		tág/k,dag/k 𒁖	t/daḫ, túḫ 𒈭	t/dal 𒊑 (=ri)	tám/dam 𒁮 (=DAM "wife")	t/dan 𒆗 (=kal)	tar 𒋻	t/dáš,t/diš 𒁹 ("1"); tàš 𒀾	
d-/t-	-e-/-i-						t/dim 𒁴	tin/tén 𒁷	dir (=DIR "red"); tir/ter 𒌁 (=TIR "forest")	tíš	
d-/t-	-u-	t/dub/p 𒁾 (=DUB "clay tablet")			t/daḫ, túḫ 𒈭	túl 𒇥	t/dum 𒌈		túr/dur 𒄙 (=DUR "strip")		
g-/k-	-a-	kab/p, gáb/p 𒆏 (=KAB "left")	k/gad/t 𒃰 (=GAD "linen")			gal 𒃲 (=GAL "great"); kal, gal_{9} 𒆗; kal 𒆗 (=KAL "strong")	kam/gám 𒄰 (=TU_{7} "soup")	k/gán 𒃷 (=GÁN "field")	kar (=KAR "find"); k/gàr 𒃼	k/gaš 𒁉 (=bi, KAŠ "beer")	gaz 𒄤 (=GAZ "kill")
g-/k-	-i-	kib/p	kid/t_{9} 𒃰 (=gad)						k/gir 𒄫	kiš 𒆧 (=KIŠ "world")	
g-/k-	-u-					kul 𒆰 (=KUL "offspring"); kúl, gul 𒄢 (=GUL "break")	k/gum 𒄣		kur 𒆳 (=KUR "land"); kùr/gur 𒄥		
ḫ-	-a-	ḫab/p 𒆸	ḫad/t 𒉺 (=pa, PA "sceptre")			ḫal 𒄬			ḫar/ḫur 𒄯 (ḪAR "ring", ḪUR "thick", MUR "lung")	ḫaš 𒋻	
ḫ-	-u-	ḫub/p 𒄽				ḫul (=ḪUL "evil")			ḫar/ḫur 𒄯 (ḪAR "ring", ḪUR "thick", MUR "lung")		
l-	-a-				lal 𒇲 (=LAL "bind")	lam 𒇴					
l-	-i-			lig/k 𒌨 (=ur)						liš 𒇺 (=LIŠ "spoon")	
l-	-u-				luḫ 𒈛 (=LUḪ "minister")		lum 𒈝				
m-	-a-				maḫ 𒈤 (=MAḪ "great")			man (=MAN "20")	mar 𒈥	maš 𒈦 (=MAŠ "half")	
m-	-e-/-i-					mil/mel 𒅖 (=iš)				meš (="90"); miš 𒈩	
m-	-u-		mut (=MUD "blood")						mur 𒄯 (=ḫur)		
n-	-a-	nab/p 𒀮					nam 𒉆 (=NAM "district")				
n-	-i-								nir 𒉪	niš (=man)	
r-	-a-		rad/t 𒋥								
r-	-i-									riš 𒊕 (=šag)	
š-	-a-	šab/p		šag/k 𒊕 (=SAG "head")	šaḫ 𒋚 (=ŠUBUR "pig")	šal 𒊩 (=MUNUS "woman")	šam 𒌑 (=ú); šàm		šar 𒊬 (=SAR "plant")		
š-	-i-	šìp							šir 𒋓 (=ŠIR "testicles")		
š-	-u-						šum 𒋳		šur 𒋩		
z-	-u-					zul 𒂄	zum 𒍮				

== Determiners ==
Determiners are Sumerograms that are not pronounced but indicate the class or nature of a noun for clarity, e.g. in ^{URU}Ḫa-at-tu-ša (𒌷𒄩𒀜𒌅𒊭); the URU is a determiner marking the name of a city, and the pronunciation is simply /hattusa/. Sumerograms proper on the other hand are ideograms intended to be pronounced in Hittite.

- DIŠ (ᵐ) 𒁹, male personal names
- DIDLI 𒀸 (suffixed), plural or collective
- DIDLI ḪI.A 𒀸𒄭𒀀 (suffixed), plural
- DINGIR (ᴰ) 𒀭 "deity"
- DUG 𒂁 "vessel"
- É 𒂍 "house"
- GAD 𒃰 "linen, cloth"
- GI 𒄀 "tube; reed"
- GIŠ 𒄑 "wood"
- GUD 𒄞 "bovid"
- ḪI.A 𒄭𒀀(suffixed), plural
- ḪUR.SAG 𒄯𒊕 "mountain"
- ÍD 𒀀𒇉 "river"
- IM 𒅎 "clay"
- ITU 𒌚 "month"
- KAM 𒄰 (suffixed), numerals
- KI 𒆠 (suffixed), in 0.6% of toponyms
- KU_{6} 𒄩 "fish"
- KUR 𒆳 "land"
- KUŠ 𒋢 "hide, fur"
- LÚ 𒇽 "man"
- MEŠ 𒈨𒌍 (suffixed), plural
- MEŠ ḪI.A 𒈨𒌍𒄭𒀀 (suffixed), plural
- MUL 𒀯 "star"
- MUNUS (ᶠ) 𒊩 "woman", female personal name
- MUŠ 𒈲 "serpent"
- MUŠEN 𒄷 (suffixed) "bird"
- NA₄ 𒉌𒌓 "stone"
- NINDA 𒃻 "bread"
- PÚ 𒇥 "source"
- SAR 𒊬 (suffixed) "plant"
- SI 𒋛 "horn"
- SÍG 𒋠 "wool"
- TU_{7} 𒄰 "soup"
- TÚG 𒌆 "garment"
- Ú 𒌑 "plant"
- URU 𒌷 "city"
- URUDU 𒍐 "copper"
- UZU 𒍜 "meat"

== See also ==
- Alphabets of Anatolia
- Anatolian hieroglyphs
- Determinative
- Hittites

== Bibliography ==
- Forrer, Emil (1922). Die Keilschrift von Boghazköi (in German). Leipzig: J.C. Hinrich.
- Friedrich, Johannes (1960). Hethitisches Keilschrift-Lesebuch (in German). Heidelberg: Carl Winter Universitätsverlag.
- Rüster, Christel; Neu, Erich (1989). Hethitisches Zeichenlexikon: Inventar und Interpretation der Keilschriftzeichen aus den Boğazköy-Texten (in German). Wiesbaden: Harrassowitz. ISBN 9783447027946. Often referred to as HZL.
- Haet, Gillian R. (February 1980). "Some observations on plene-writing in Hittite". Bulletin of the School of Oriental and African Studies. 43 (1): 1–17. doi:10.1017/S0041977X00110493.
- Gordin, Shai (2015). Hittite scribal circles: scholarly tradition and writing habits. Wiesbaden: Harrassowitz Verlag. ISBN 978-3447105262. JSTOR j.ctvc76zpc.
- Hoffner Jr., Harry A.; Melchert, H. Craig (2024). A Grammar of the Hittite Language: Part 1: Reference Grammar (Second ed.). University Park, PA: Penn State University Press. ISBN 9781646023066.
- Kloekhorst, Alwin (2008). Etymological dictionary of the Hittite inherited lexicon. Leiden; Boston, MA: Brill. ISBN 978-90-04-16092-7.
