= Alwin Kloekhorst =

Dutch linguist (born 1978)

- Born: 4 March 1978; Smilde, Drenthe, Netherlands

Academic background
- Education: Leiden University (PhD)

Academic work
- Discipline: Linguistics, historical linguistics, Hittitology
- Institutions: Leiden University

Alwin Kloekhorst (born 4 March 1978) is a Dutch linguist, Indo-Europeanist and Hittitologist. He was appointed a full professor in Anatolian Linguistics at Leiden University in November 2023.

== Biography ==
Kloekhorst received his Ph.D. in 2007 at Leiden University for his thesis on Hittite. In over 1200 pages, his dissertation describes the history of Hittite in the light of its Indo-European language origin. Part One, Towards a Hittite Historical Grammar, contains a description of Hittite phonology and a discussion of the sound laws and morphological changes that took place between Proto-Indo-European and Hittite. Part Two, An Etymological Dictionary of the Hittite Inherited Lexicon, contains etymological treatments of all Hittite words of Indo-European origin. One of the dissertation's most important conclusions is the confirmation that the Anatolian languages split from Proto-Indo-European before all other Indo-European branches, which have undergone a period of common innovations (see Indo-Hittite). The thesis was published in the Leiden-based Indo-European Etymological Dictionary project.

Kloekhorst’s understanding of Hittite and Indo-European phonology differs in some respects from mainstream ideas in Indo-European studies. For instance, Kloekhorst subscribes to the glottalic theory, which rejects the traditionally reconstructed split between Proto-Indo-European voiceless, voiced, and aspirated stops. However, his dictionary nevertheless utilizes the standard notation for these PIE phonemes, those being *p, *b, and *bʰ respectively. Furthermore, Kloekhorst affirms an orthographic distinction between lenis and fortis consonants in Hittite, as opposed to the alternative proposal that Hittite distinguished between voiced and voiceless stops. Though Kloekhorst’s views on this matter are not universally accepted, the philologist Mark Weeden still described this perspective as “refreshing, with new insights and clear, incisive arguments.”

Kloekhorst’s dictionary received praise, with Weeden declaring that it had achieved a “systematic and comprehensive account of Hittite historical phonology.” To verify that certain Hittite terms were correctly transcribed based upon their cuneiform attestation, Kloekhorst utilized photos and drawings, a practice that Weeden described as a “useful innovation.” Weeden further lauded the dictionary for its “extensive scope and detail,” though he has also noted that the work limited its coverage exclusively to words considered to be of Indo-European origin, thereby comprising its value in comparison to other etymological dictionaries that describe the entire Hittite lexicon. Kloekhorst’s own approach to Hittite phonology nessecitated his abandonment of certain traditionally upheld etymologies, though—according to Weeden—it also elucidated the origin of numerous other previously inscrutable terms.

== Works ==
- The Precursors of Proto-Indo-European: The Indo-Anatolian and Indo-Uralic Hypotheses, edited with Tijmen Pronk, 2019, Leiden: Brill, viii+235 pp.
- Kanišite Hittite: The Earliest Attested Record of Indo-European, 2019, Leiden – Boston, xii + 303 pp.
- Accent in Hittite: A Study in Plene Spelling, Consonant Gradation, Clitics, and Metrics (= Studien zu den Boğazköy-Texten 56), Wiesbaden, 2014, xxxvi + 716 pp.
- Etymological Dictionary of the Hittite Inherited Lexicon (= Leiden Indo-European Etymological Dictionary Series 5), 2008, Leiden – Boston, xiii + 1162 pp.
- Hethitische Texte in Transkription. KBo 35 (= Dresdner Beiträge zur Hethitologie 19), 2006, Wiesbaden, xiv + 353 pp. (together with D. Groddek)
