= Hattian Dupatta =

Town in Pakistan-administered Kashmir

Hattian Dupatta, also called Qasba Hattian Dupatta (Urdu: ھٹیاں دوپٹہ) is a historical town of Muzaffarabad District, Azad Kashmir, Pakistan. It is located 21 km from the Muzaffarabad toward Srinagar road.
