= Hittite language =

Extinct Bronze Age Indo-European language

Hittite
- Nesite
- 𒌷𒉌𒅆𒇷 nešili
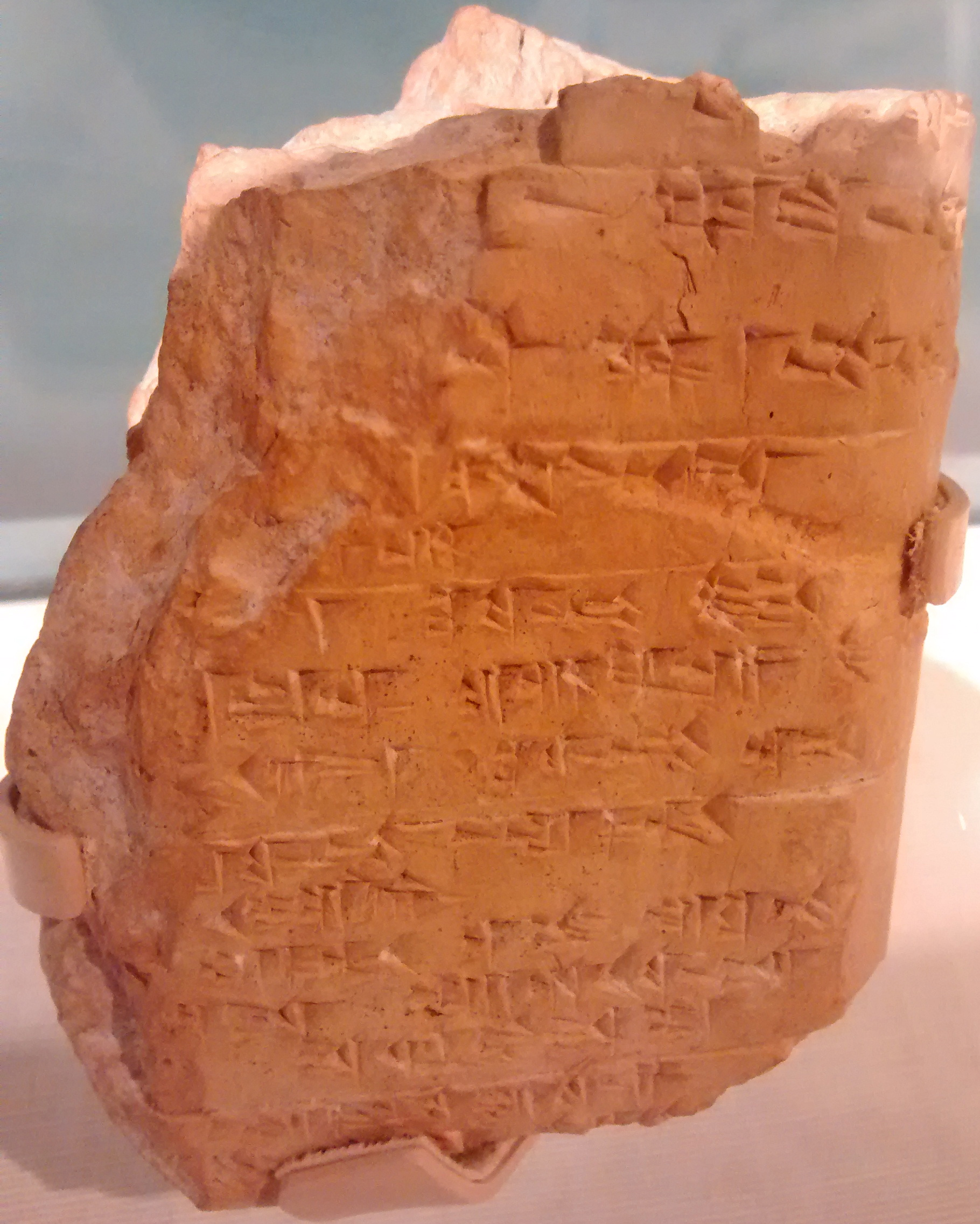
- A 13th century BC Hittite cuneiform tablet
- Region: Anatolia
- Era: attested c. 1600 – c. 1200 BC
- Language family: Indo-European: Anatolian; Hittite
- Dialects: Ḫattuša; Kanišite
- Writing system: Hittite cuneiform

Language codes
- ISO 639-2: hit
- ISO 639-3: Variously: hit – Hittite oht – Old Hittite htx – Middle Hittite nei – New Hittite
- Glottolog: hitt1242

Hittite, (Note: Hittite cuneiform: 𒌷𒉌𒅆𒇷, romanized: nešili, lit. 'in the language of Neša', or nešumnili lit. 'in the language of the people of Neša') also known as Nesite, is an extinct Indo-European language formerly spoken in Anatolia during the Bronze Age. The language is attested in cuneiform texts, primarily from the archives of the city of Hattusa, between the 17th century BC to the 13th century BC. Isolated Hittite words and personal names appear in Akkadian documents in Kanesh from as early as the 20th century BC, making it the earliest attested use of the Indo-European languages.

By the Late Bronze Age, Hittite had started losing ground to its close relative Luwian. It appears that Luwian was the most widely spoken language in the Hittite capital of Hattusa during the 13th century BC. After the collapse of the Hittite New Kingdom during the more general Late Bronze Age collapse, Luwian emerged in the early Iron Age as the main language of the so-called Syro-Hittite states, in southwestern Anatolia and northern Syria.

== Name ==
Indo-European family tree in order of first attestation. Hittite belongs to the family of Anatolian languages and is among the oldest written Indo-European languages.

Hittite is the modern scholarly name for the language, based on the identification of the Hatti (Ḫatti) kingdom with the Biblical Hittites (Biblical Hebrew: *חתים Ḥittim), although that name appears to have been applied incorrectly: The term Hattian refers to the indigenous people who preceded the Hittites, speaking a non-Indo-European Hattic language.

In multilingual texts found in Hittite locations, passages written in Hittite are preceded by the adverb nesili (or nasili, nisili), "in the [speech] of Neša (Kaneš)", an important city during the early stages of the Hittite Old Kingdom. In one case, the label is Kanisumnili, "in the [speech] of the people of Kaneš".

Although the Hittite New Kingdom had people from many diverse ethnic and linguistic backgrounds, the Hittite language was used in most secular written texts. In spite of various arguments over the appropriateness of the term, Hittite remains the most current term because of convention and the strength of association with the Biblical Hittites. The endonymic term nešili, and its Anglicized variants (Nesite, Nessite, Neshite), have never caught on.

== Classification ==
Hittite is one of the Anatolian languages and is known from cuneiform tablets and inscriptions that were erected by the Hittite kings. The script formerly known as "Hieroglyphic Hittite" is now termed Hieroglyphic Luwian. The Anatolian branch also includes Cuneiform Luwian, Hieroglyphic Luwian, Palaic, Lycian, Milyan, Lydian, Carian, Pisidian, Sidetic and Isaurian.

Unlike most other Indo-European languages, Hittite does not distinguish between masculine and feminine grammatical gender, and it lacks subjunctive and optative moods as well as aspect. Various hypotheses have been formulated to explain these differences.

Some linguists, most notably Edgar H. Sturtevant and Warren Cowgill, have argued that Hittite should be classified as a sister language to Proto-Indo-European, rather than as a daughter language. Their Indo-Hittite hypothesis is that the parent language (Indo-Hittite) lacked the features that are absent in Hittite as well, and that Proto-Indo-European later innovated them.

Other linguists, however, prefer the Schwund ("loss") Hypothesis in which Hittite (or Anatolian) came from Proto-Indo-European, with its full range of features, but the features became simplified in Hittite.

According to Craig Melchert, the current tendency (as of 2012) is to suppose that Proto-Indo-European evolved and that the "prehistoric speakers" of Anatolian became isolated "from the rest of the PIE speech community, so as not to share in some common innovations". Hittite and the other Anatolian languages split off from Proto-Indo-European at an early stage. Hittite thus preserved archaisms that would be lost in the other Indo-European languages.

Hittite has many loanwords, particularly religious vocabulary from the non-Indo-European Hurrian and Hattic languages. The latter was the language of the Hattians, the local inhabitants of the land of Hatti before they were absorbed or displaced by the Hittites. Sacred and magical texts from Hattusa were often written in Hattic, Hurrian and Luwian even after Hittite had become the norm for other writings.

== History ==
The Hittite language has traditionally been stratified into Old Hittite (OH), Middle Hittite (MH) and New Hittite or Neo-Hittite (NH, not to be confused with the polysemic use of "Neo-Hittite" label as a designation for the later period, which is actually post-Hittite), corresponding to the Old, Middle and New Kingdoms of the Hittite history (c. 1750–1500 BC, 1500–1430 BC and 1430–1180 BC, respectively). The stages are differentiated on both linguistic and paleographic grounds.

The Dutch Hittitologist Alwin Kloekhorst (2019) recognizes two dialectal variants of Hittite: one he calls "Kanišite Hittite", and a second he named "Ḫattuša Hittite" (or Hittite proper). The first is attested in clay tablets from Kaniš/Neša (Kültepe), and is dated earlier than the findings from Ḫattuša.

== Script ==
Hittite was written in an adapted form of Peripheral Akkadian cuneiform orthography from Northern Syria. The predominantly syllabic nature of the script makes it difficult to ascertain the precise phonetic qualities of some of the Hittite sound inventory.

The syllabary distinguishes the following consonants (notably, the Akkadian s series is dropped),

b, d, g, ḫ, k, l, m, n, p, r, š, t, z, combined with the vowels a, e, i, u. Additionally, ya (= I.A : 𒄿𒀀), wa (= PI : 𒉿) and wi (= wi_{5} = GEŠTIN : 𒃾) signs are introduced.

The Akkadian unvoiced/voiced series (k/g, p/b, t/d) do not express the voiced/unvoiced contrast in writing, but double spellings in intervocalic positions represent voiceless consonants in Indo-European (Sturtevant's law).

== Phonology ==
Since there are no longer any living speakers of Hittite, the precise sounds of the language are unknown. Scholars reconstruct the phonology of Hittite based on the written evidence of Hittite in cuneiform and indirect evidence from the transcription of Hittite words in other contemporary writing systems, such as Egyptian Hieroglyphs. Hittite's writing system is challenging to interpret phonologically because it was adapted from a system designed for the Akkadian language. The transliteration conventions of Hittite are also based on those used in Assyriology, parts of which may appear strange in the context of Hittite.

=== Consonants ===
Hittite consonants
		Labial	Alveolar		Palatal	Velar		Uvular	
		Labial	Alveolar		Palatal	plain	labial	plain	labial
Nasal	lenis	m	n						
Nasal	fortis	mː	nː						
Plosive	lenis	p	t			k	kʷ		
Plosive	fortis	pː	tː			kː	kʷː		
Fricative	lenis		s					χ	χʷ
Fricative	fortis		sː					χː	χʷː
Affricate			t͡s						
Liquid	lenis		r	l					
Liquid	fortis		rː	lː					
Glide					j		w		

Supporters of a length distinction usually point to the fact that Akkadian, the language from which the Hittites borrowed the cuneiform script, had voicing, but Hittite scribes used voiced and voiceless signs interchangeably. Alwin Kloekhorst also argues that the absence of assimilatory voicing is also evidence for a length distinction. He points out that the word "e-ku-ud-du – [ɛ́kʷːtu]" does not show any voice assimilation. However, if the distinction were one of voice, agreement between the stops should be expected since the velar and the alveolar plosives are known to be adjacent since that word's "u" represents not a vowel but labialization.

==== Laryngeals ====
Hittite has retained two of the three Proto-Indo-European laryngeals (*h₂ and *h₃ word-initially), which evolved into the Hittite phoneme transcribed with the letter ḫ. The existence of Proto-Indo-European laryngeals had been hypothesized in 1879 by Ferdinand de Saussure, who suggested the presence of these phonemes on the basis of vowel quality as it supposedly developed from Proto-Indo-European into the languages that were known at the time. Hittite texts, which were recovered from 1906 onwards, confirmed Saussure's laryngeal theory by featuring direct reflexes of Proto-Indo-European *h₂ and *h₃.

Both the preservation of the laryngeals and the lack of evidence that Hittite shared certain grammatical features in the other early Indo-European languages have led some philologists to believe that the Anatolian languages split from the rest of Proto-Indo-European much earlier than the other divisions of the proto-language. See #Classification above for more details.

=== Vowels ===
Hittite vowels
	Front	Central	Back
Close	i, iː		u, uː
Mid	e, eː		o, oː
Open		a aː	

Hittite is now agreed to have had at least five vowels and a vowel length contrast. The practice of plene spelling, in which an extra identical vowel sign is added to mark vowels already represented by a CV or VC sign, is usually taken to signal vowel length. Although vowels with plene spelling are nearly always long, the usage of plene spelling is not consistent across all long vowels.

The distinction between /u/ and /o/, represented respectively by the signs transliterated ⟨Ú⟩ (Note: Cuneiform: 𒌑) and ⟨U⟩ (Note: Cuneiform: 𒌋) was not recognized until the 21st century. Unlike other pairs of vowels, the distribution of long /uː/ and /oː/ are mostly predictable, leading Alwin Kloekhorst to reject the postulation of the long /oː/ phoneme. However, Craig Melchert states that they contrast in some environments, identifying minimal pairs such as šu-u-wa 'to fill' and šu-ú-wa 'to push, reject'.

== Morphology ==
Hittite is the oldest attested Indo-European language, yet it lacks several grammatical features that are exhibited by other early-attested Indo-European languages such as Vedic Sanskrit, Classical Latin, Ancient Greek, Old Persian and Old Avestan. Notably, Hittite did not have a masculine–feminine gender system. Instead, it had a rudimentary noun-class system that was based on an older animate–inanimate opposition.

=== Nouns ===
Hittite inflects for nine cases: nominative, vocative, accusative, genitive, dative-locative, ablative, ergative, allative, and instrumental; two numbers: singular, and plural; and two animacy classes: animate (common), and inanimate (neuter). Adjectives and pronouns agree with nouns for animacy, number, and case.

The distinction in animacy is rudimentary and generally occurs in the nominative case, and the same noun is sometimes attested in both animacy classes. There is a trend towards distinguishing fewer cases in the plural than in the singular. The ergative case is used when an inanimate noun is the subject of a transitive verb. Early Hittite texts have a vocative case for a few nouns with -u, but it ceased to be productive by the time of the earliest discovered sources and was subsumed by the nominative in most documents. The allative was subsumed in the later stages of the language by the dative-locative. An archaic genitive plural -an is found irregularly in earlier texts, as is an instrumental plural in -it. A few nouns also form a distinct locative, which had no case ending at all.

The examples of pišna- ("man") for animate and pēda- ("place") for inanimate are used here to show the Hittite noun declension's most basic form:

	Animate		Inanimate	
	Singular	Plural	Singular	Plural
Nominative	pišnaš	pišnēš	pēdan	pēda
Accusative	pišnan	pišnuš	pēdan	pēda
Ergative	pišnanza	pišnantēš	pēdanza	pēdantēš
Vocative	pišne		–	–
Genitive	pišnaš		pēdaš	
Dative/Locative	pišni	pišnaš	pēdi	pēdaš
Ablative	pišnaz		pēdaz	
Allative	pišna	–	pēda	–
Instrumental	pišnit		pēdit	

=== Verbs ===
The verbal morphology is less complicated than for other early-attested Indo-European languages like Ancient Greek and Vedic. Hittite verbs inflect according to two general conjugations (mi-conjugation and hi-conjugation), two voices (active and medio-passive), two moods (indicative mood and imperative), two aspects (perfective and imperfective), and two tenses (present and preterite). Verbs have two infinitive forms, a verbal noun, a supine, and a participle. Rose (2006) lists 132 hi verbs and interprets the hi/mi oppositions as vestiges of a system of grammatical voice ("centripetal voice" vs. "centrifugal voice").

	mi-conjugation active	ḫi-conjugation active	Shared medio-passive
Indicative present
1. Singular	-mi	-ḫḫi	-ḫḫa/-ḫḫari/-ḫḫaḫari
2. Singular	-ši (also: -ti)	-ti	tta/-ttari (or -tati)
3. Singular	-zzi	-i	a/-ari/-tta/-ttari
1. Plural	-wēni/-wāni/-uni		-wašta (or -waštari)
2. Plural	-ttēni/-ttāni (or -šteni)		-dduma/-ddumari (or -ddumat)
3. Plural	-anzi		-anta/-antari
Indicative preterite
1st singular	-un/-nun	-ḫḫun	-ḫḫat/-ḫḫati/-ḫḫaḫat/-ḫḫaḫati
2nd singular	-š/-ta	-ta (also: -š)	-ttat/-ttati (or -tta/-at)
3rd singular	-ta	-š/-iš/-eš/-ta (or -šta)	-at/-ati/-ta/-ttat/-ttati
1st plural	-wen		-waštat/-waštati
2nd plural	-tten (or -šten)		-ddumat/-ddudumati
3rd plural	-ir		-antat/-antati
Imperative present
1st singular	-allu	-allu/-lu	-ḫḫaru/-ḫḫaḫaru
2nd singular	null, -t (or -i)	null, -i	-ḫuti/-ḫut
3rd singular	-tu	-u (or -štu)	-aru/-ttaru
1st plural	-wēni/-wāni		*-waštati
2nd plural	-tten (or -šten)		-ddumat/-ddumati
3rd plural	-andu		-antaru

== Syntax ==
Hittite is a head-final language: it has subject-object-verb word order, a split ergative alignment, and is a synthetic language; adpositions follow their complement, adjectives and genitives precede the nouns that they modify, adverbs precede verbs, and subordinate clauses precede main clauses.

Hittite syntax shows one noteworthy feature that is typical of Anatolian languages: commonly, the beginning of a sentence or clause is composed of either a sentence-connecting particle or otherwise a fronted or topicalized form, and a "chain" of fixed-order clitics is then appended.

== Decipherment ==
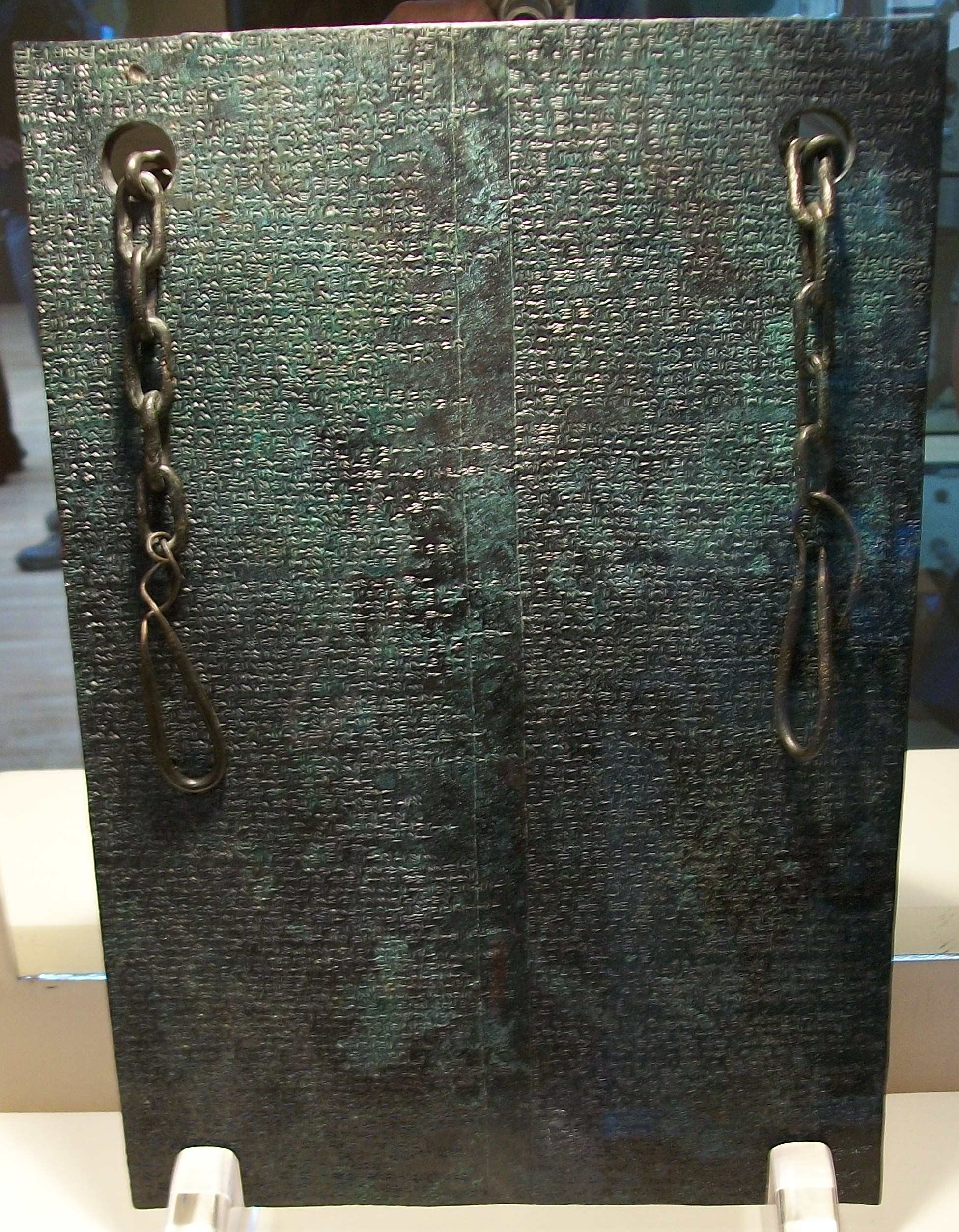
Treaty between Tudhaliya IV of Hatti and Kurunta of Tarhuntassa (Bo 86/299), the only known bronze Hittite tablet, discovered in Hattusa, 1986. Museum of Anatolian Civilisation in Ankara

The first substantive claim as to the affiliation of Hittite was made by Jørgen Alexander Knudtzon in 1902, in a book devoted to two letters between the king of Egypt and a Hittite ruler, found at El-Amarna, Egypt. Knudtzon argued that Hittite was Indo-European, largely because of its morphology. Although he had no bilingual texts, he was able to provide a partial interpretation of the two letters because of the formulaic nature of the diplomatic correspondence of the period.

Knudtzon was definitively shown to have been correct when many tablets written in the familiar Akkadian cuneiform script but in an unknown language were discovered by Hugo Winckler in what is now the village of Boğazköy, Turkey, which was the former site of Hattusa, the capital of the Hittite state. Based on a study of this extensive material, Bedřich Hrozný succeeded in analyzing the language. He presented his argument that the language is Indo-European in a paper published in 1915 (Hrozný 1915), which was followed by a grammar of the language (Hrozný 1917).

Hrozný's argument for the Indo-European affiliation of Hittite was thoroughly modern although poorly substantiated. He focused on the striking similarities in idiosyncratic aspects of the morphology that are unlikely to occur independently by chance or to be borrowed. They included the r/n alternation in some noun stems (the heteroclitics) and vocalic ablaut, which are both seen in the alternation in the word for water between the nominative singular, wadar, and the genitive singular, wedenas. He also presented a set of regular sound correspondences.

After a brief initial delay because of disruption during the First World War, Hrozný's decipherment, tentative grammatical analysis and demonstration of the Indo-European affiliation of Hittite were rapidly accepted and more broadly substantiated by contemporary scholars such as Edgar H. Sturtevant, who authored the first scientifically acceptable Hittite grammar with a chrestomathy and a glossary. The most up-to-date grammar of the Hittite language is currently Hoffner and Melchert (2008).

== Corpus ==
More than 30,000 tablets or fragments have been excavated from the royal archives of the capital of the Hittite Kingdom Hattusa, close to the modern town of Boğazkale or Boğazköy. While Hattusa has yielded the majority of tablets, other sites where they have been found include: Maşat Höyük, Ortaköy, Kuşaklı or Kayalıpınar in Turkey, Alalakh, Ugarit and Emar in Syria, Amarna in Egypt.

The tablets are mostly conserved in the Turkish museums of Ankara, Istanbul, Boğazkale and Çorum (Ortaköy) as well as in international museums such as the Pergamonmuseum in Berlin, the British Museum in London and the Musée du Louvre in Paris.

=== The proclamation of Anitta ===
This text has been found in three versions, the earliest of which is considered the oldest known of all Hittite language texts, dated from between the end of the 17th century BC and the middle of the 16th century BC.

Transliteration	Translation
^{M}A-ni-it-ta DUMU ^{M}Pi-it-ha-a-na LUGAL ^{URU}Ku-us-sa-ra QÍ-BÍ-MA ne-pi-is-za-as-ta ^{D}IŠKUR-un-ni a-as-su-us e-es-ta na-as-ta ^{D}IŠKUR-un-ni-ma ma-a-an a-as-su-us e-es-ta ^{URU}Ne-e-sa-as LUGAL-us ^{URU}Ku-us-sa-ra-as LUGAL-i ... LUGAL ^{URU}Ku-us-sa-ra URU-az kat-ta pa-an-ga-ri-it ú-e-et nu ^{URU}Ne-e-sa-an is-pa-an-di na-ak-ki-it da-a-as^{URU}Ne-e-sa-as LUGAL-un IṢ-BAT Ù DUMU^{MEŠ} ^{URU}Ne-e-sa-as i-da-a-lu na-at-ta ku-e-da-ni-ik-ki tak-ki-is-ta an-nu-us at-tu-us i-e-et nu ^{M}Pi-it-ha-a-na-as at-ta-as-ma-as a-ap-pa-an sa-ni-ya ú-et-ti hu-ul-la-an-za-an hu-ul-la-nu-un^{D}UTU-az ut-ne-e ku-it ku-it-pat a-ra-is nu-us hu-u-ma-an-du-us-pat hu-ul-la-nu-un ka-ru-ú ^{M}U-uh-na-as LUGAL ^{URU}Za-a-al-pu-wa ^{D}Si-ú-sum-mi-in ^{URU}Ne-e-sa-az ^{URU}Za-a-al-pu-wa pe-e-da-as ap-pe-ez-zi-ya-na ^{M}A-ni-it-ta-as LUGAL.GAL ^{D}Si-ú-sum-mi-in ^{URU}Za-a-al-pu-wa-az a-ap-pa ^{URU}Ne-e-sa pe-e-tah-hu-un^{M}Hu-uz-zi-ya-na LUGAL ^{URU}Za-a-al-pu-wa hu-su-wa-an-ta-an ^{URU}Ne-e-sa ú-wa-te-nu-un^{URU}Ha-at-tu-sa tak-ki-is-ta sa-an ta-a-la-ah-hu-un ma-a-na-as ap-pe-ez-zi-ya-na ki-is-ta-an-zi-at-ta-at sa-an ^{D}Hal-ma-su-i-iz ^{D}si-i-us-mi-is pa-ra-a pa-is sa-an is-pa-an-di na-ak-ki-it da-a-ah-hu-un pe-e-di-is-si-ma ZÀ.AH-LI-an a-ne-e-nu-un ku-is am-me-el a-ap-pa-an LUGAL-us ki-i-sa-ri nu ^{URU}Ha-at-tu-sa-an a-ap-pa a-sa-a-si na-an ne-pi-sa-as ^{D}IŠKUR-as ha-az-zi-e-et-tu	Anitta, Son of Pithana, King of Kussara, speak! He was dear to the Stormgod of Heaven, And when he was dear to the Stormgod of Heaven, the king of Nesa [verb broken off] to the king of Kussara. The king of Kussara, Pithana, came down out of the city in force, and he took the city of Nesa in the night by force. He took the King of Nesa captive, but he did not do any evil to the inhabitants of Nesa; instead, He made them mothers and fathers. After my father, Pithana, I suppressed a revolt in the same year. Whatever lands rose up in the direction of the sunrise, I defeated each of the aforementioned. Previously, Uhna, the king of Zalpuwas, had removed our Sius from the city of Nesa to the city of Zalpuwas. But subsequently, I, Anittas, the Great King, brought our Sius back from Zalpuwas to Nesa. But Huzziyas, the king of Zalpuwas, I brought back alive to Nesa. The city of Hattusas [tablet broken] Contrived. And I abandoned it. But afterwards, when it suffered famine, My goddess, Halmasuwiz, handed it over to me. And in the night I took it by force; and in its place, I sowed weeds. Whoever becomes king after me and settles Hattusas again, may the Stormgod of Heaven smite him!

== See also ==
- Hittitology

== Sources ==
- Beckman, Gary (2011). S.R. Steadman; G. McMahon (eds.). "The Hittite Language: Recovery and Grammatical Sketch". The Oxford Handbook of Ancient Anatolia 10,000-323 B.C.E.: 518–533. hdl:2027.42/86652.
- Bryce, Trevor R. (2002). Life and Society in the Hittite World. New York: Oxford University Press. ISBN 9780199241705.
- Bryce, Trevor R. (2005) [1998]. The Kingdom of the Hittites (PDF) (2nd revised ed.). New York: Oxford University Press. ISBN 9780199279081.
- Bryce, Trevor R. (2012). The World of The Neo-Hittite Kingdoms: A Political and Military History. New York: Oxford University Press. ISBN 9780191505027.
- Fortson, Benjamin W. (2004). Indo-European Language and Culture : an Introduction. Malden: Blackwell. ISBN 1-4051-0316-7.
- Glatz, Claudia (2020). The Making of Empire in Bronze Age Anatolia: Hittite Sovereign Practice, Resistance, and Negotiation. Cambridge: Cambridge University Press. ISBN 9781108491105.
- Hoffner, Harry A.; Melchert, H. Craig (2024). A grammar of the Hittite language. Languages of the ancient Near East (2nd ed.). University Park, Pennsylvania: Eisenbrauns. ISBN 978-1-64602-292-2.
- Hout, Theo van den (2011). The Elements of Hittite. Cambridge: Cambridge University Press. ISBN 9781139501781.
- Hrozný, Bedřich (1917). Die Sprache der Hethiter: ihr Bau und ihre Zugehörigkeit zum indogermanischen Sprachstamm. Leipzig: Hinrichs.
- Inglese, Guglielmo (2020). The Hittite Middle Voice: Synchrony, Diachrony, Typology. Leiden-Boston: Brill. ISBN 9789004432307.
- Jasanoff, Jay H. (2003). Hittite and the Indo-European Verb. Oxford: Oxford University Press. ISBN 0-19-924905-9.
- Kloekhorst, Alwin (2008). Etymological Dictionary of the Hittite Inherited Lexicon. Leiden Indo-European Etymological Dictionary Series. Vol. 5. Brill. ISBN 978-90-04-16092-7.
- Kloekhorst, Alwin (2019). Kanišite Hittite: the earliest attested record of Indo-European. Handbook of Oriental studies = Handbuch der orientalistik. Section one, the Near and Middle East. Leiden; Boston: Brill. ISBN 978-90-04-39791-0.
- Melchert, H. Craig (2012). "The Position of Anatolian" (PDF).
- Melchert, H. Craig (2020). "Hittite Historical Phonology after 100 Years (and after 20 Years)". In Kim, Ronald I.; Mynářová, Jana; Pavúk, Peter (eds.). Hrozný and Hittite: The First Hundred Years. Culture and History of the Ancient Near East. Vol. 107. Leiden: Brill. doi:10.1163/9789004413122. ISBN 978-90-04-41312-2. ISSN 1566-2055.
- Yakubovich, Ilya (2010). Sociolinguistics of the Luwian Language. Leiden: Brill. ISBN 9789004177918.
- Yakubovich, Ilya (2020). "Hittite". A Companion to Ancient Near Eastern Languages. Hoboken: John Wiley & Sons. pp. 221–237. ISBN 9781119193296.
