= Bedřich Hrozný =

Czech archeologist, linguist and orientalist (1879–1952)

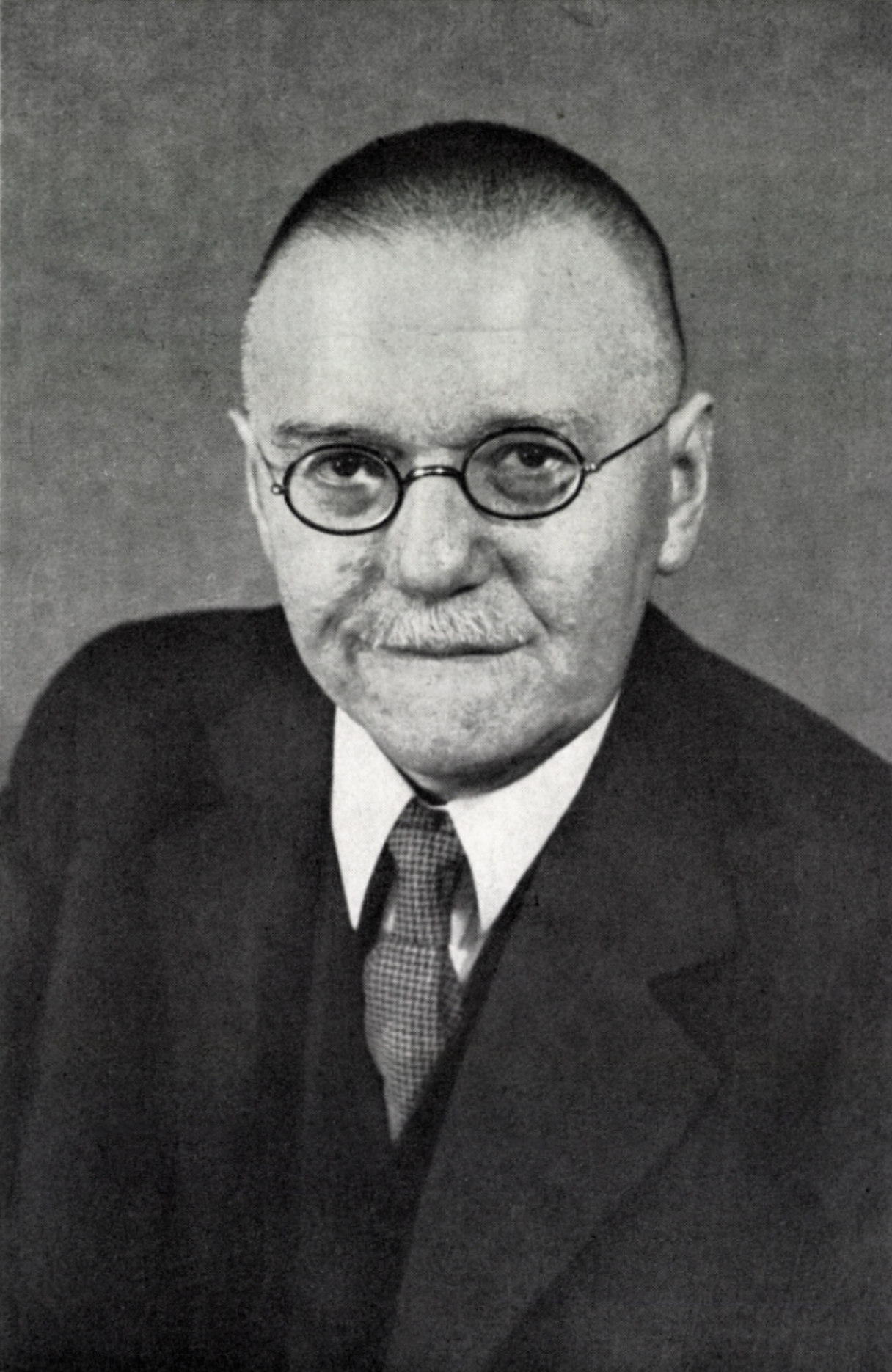
- Hrozný in c. 1949
- Born: 6 May 1879; Lysá nad Labem, Bohemia, Austria-Hungary
- Died: 12 December 1952 (aged 73); Prague, Czechoslovakia
- Other name: Friedrich Hrozny
- Known for: Contribution to the decipherment of Hittite

Academic work
- Discipline: Orientalist
- Main interests: Hittitology

Bedřich Hrozný (Czech pronunciation: [ˈbɛdr̝ɪx ˈɦrozniː]; 6 May 1879 – 12 December 1952), also known as Friedrich Hrozny, was a Czech orientalist and linguist. He contributed to the decipherment of the ancient Hittite language, identified it as an Indo-European language, and laid the groundwork for the development of Hittitology.

== Biography ==
Hrozný was born in Lysá nad Labem, Bohemia, Austria-Hungary. In the town of Kolín he learned Hebrew and Arabic. At the University of Vienna, he studied Akkadian, Aramaic, Ethiopian, Sumerian and Sanskrit, as well as the cuneiform used in Asia Minor, Mesopotamia and Persia. He also studied orientalism at Humboldt University of Berlin.

== Career ==
In 1905, following excavations in Palestine, he became professor at the University of Vienna.

In 1906, at Hattusa (modern Boğazkale, about 200 km east of Ankara) a German expedition found the archives of the Hittite kings in cuneiform, but in an unknown language. While on active duty in the Austro-Hungarian army during World War I, Hrozný published in 1917 a description of the language showing that it belonged to the Indo-European family.

In 1925 Hrozný led a Czechoslovak archaeological team that discovered 1000 cuneiform tablets containing contracts and letters of Assyrian merchants in the Turkish village of Kültepe, and excavated the nearby ancient Hittite city of Kanesh.

In 1929, Hrozný founded Archiv Orientální, which became one of the leading journals for Oriental Studies.

Later in his life, he tried to decipher the hieroglyphic script used by the Hittites and scripts used in ancient India and Crete, but failed in his effort. From 1919 to 1952, he was a Professor of cuneiform research and ancient Oriental history at the Charles University in Prague. After the German occupation of Czechoslovakia he was made rector of the Charles University, holding that post in 1939–1940 (all Czech universities were closed by Germans then). In that capacity, he helped some students escape arrest during an incident in 1939, stating to the German officer in charge that the Germans had no legal right to pursue students on the independent university's territory. A stroke in 1944 ended his scientific work.

== Deciphering of the Hittite language ==
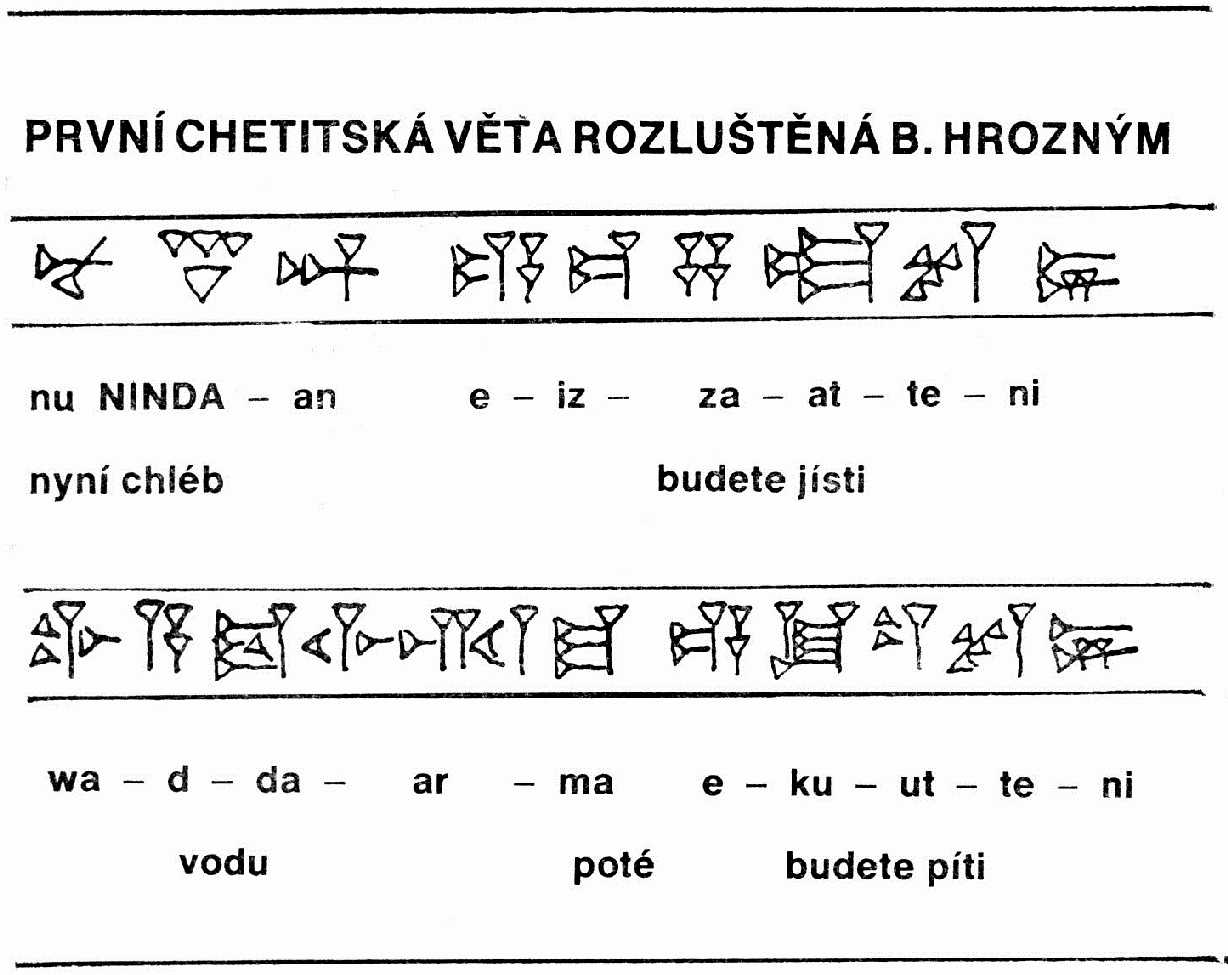
The first Hittite sentence, deciphered by Hrozny

To solve the mystery of the Hittite language, Bedřich Hrozný focused on a text passage that reads: nu NINDA-an ezzatteni watar-ma ekutteni. It was known at that time that the ideogram for NINDA meant bread in Sumerian. Hrozný thought that the suffix -an might be the Hittite accusative singular ending. Then, he assumed that the second word, ed-/ezza-, had something to do with the bread and thought that it could be the verb eat. The comparison with Latin edo, English eat, and German essen led him to infer that NINDA-an ezzatteni means "you (will) eat bread". In the second sentence, Hrozný was struck by the word watar, which recalled English water and German Wasser. The last word of the second sentence, ekutteni, had the stem eku-, which seemed to resemble the Latin aqua (water). He thus translated the second sentence as "you (will) drink water". Hrozný soon realized that the Hittites were speaking an Indo-European language, which greatly facilitated the decipherment and interpretation of Hittite cuneiform texts. Building upon these insights, he continued his work and was able to publish a preliminary Hittite grammar already in 1917.

== Publications ==
- Sumerisch-babylonische Mythen von dem Gotte Ninrag (Ninib). Berlin: Wolf Peiser, 1903.
- Obilí ve staré Babylónii. (= “Wheat in Ancient Babylonian”). Vienna: Hölder in Kommission, 1913.
- “Die Lösung des hethitischen Problems”, Mitteilungen der Deutschen Orient-Gesellschaft 56 (1915): 17–50.
- Die Sprache der Hethiter, ihr Bau und ihre Zugehörigkeit zum indogermanischen Sprachstamm. Leipzig: J.C. Hinrichs, 1917 (reprint: Dresden: TU Dresden, 2002).
- Hethitische Keilschrifttexte aus Boghazköi, in Umschrift, mit Übersetzung und Kommentar. Leipzig: J.C. Hinrichs, 1919.
- Über die Völker und Sprachen des alten Chatti-Landes: Hethitische Könige. Leipzig: J.C. Hinrichs, 1920.
- Keilschrifttexte aus Boghazköi, vol. 5 (of 6): Autographien. Leipzig: J.C. Hinrichs, 1921 (reprint: Osnabrück: Zeller, 1970).
- Les inscriptions hittites hiéroglyphiques: Essai de déchiffrement, suivi d’une grammaire hittite hiéroglyphique en paradigmes et d’une liste d’hiéroglyphes. Prague: Orientální Ústav, 1933.
- Über die älteste Völkerwanderung und über das Problem der proto-indischen Zivilisation: Ein Versuch, die proto-indischen Inschriften von Mohendscho-Daro zu entziffern. Prague, 1939.
- Die älteste Geschichte Vorderasiens und Indiens. Prague: Melantrich, 1940, 1941, 1943.
- Inscriptions cunéiformes du Kultépé, vol. 1. Prague, 1952.
- Ancient history of Western Asia, India and Crete. New York, 1953.

== Literature ==
- Šárka Velhartická: Bedřich Hrozný a 100 let chetitologie / Bedřich Hrozný and 100 Years of Hittitology. Praha (Národní galerie), 2015.
- Šárka Velhartická: Bedřich Hrozný: Texty a přednášky. Archeologické expedice a lingvistické objevy předního českého orientalisty, Praha / Hradec Králové (Academia / Univerzita Hradec Králové), 2022.
- Šárka Velhartická: Dopisy Bedřicha Hrozného literárním osobnostem, Praha (Památník národního písemnictví), 2015.
- Šárka Velhartická: Justin Václav Prášek a Bedřich Hrozný. Počátky české staroorientalistiky a klínopisného bádání, Praha / Hradec Králové (Academia / Univerzita Hradec Králové), 2019.
