= H. Craig Melchert =

American linguist (born 1945)

Craig Melchert
- Born: 5 April 1945 (age 81)

Academic background
- Education: Michigan State University; Harvard University

Academic work
- Institutions: University of North Carolina at Chapel Hill; University of California, Los Angeles

Harold Craig Melchert (born April 5, 1945) is an American linguist known particularly for his work on the Anatolian branch of Indo-European.

== Biography ==
He received his B.A. in German from Michigan State University in 1967 and his Ph.D. in Linguistics from Harvard University in 1977. From 1968 to 1972 he served in the United States Air Force, where he learned Chinese and worked as a Chinese radio listener. In 1978 he accepted a position at the University of North Carolina at Chapel Hill, where he eventually became Paul Debreczeny Distinguished Professor of Linguistics. In 2005 he was the Collitz Professor at the Linguistic Society of America Summer Institute. As of July 1, 2007 he is A. Richard Diebold Professor of Indo-European Studies at the University of California, Los Angeles.

== Selected works ==
- Studies in Hittite Historical Phonology. Göttingen: Vandenhoeck & Ruprecht, 1984, ISBN 3-525-26220-5
- Lycian Lexicon. Chapel Hill, N.C.: Copytron, 1989, iv + 122pp.; 2nd edn. Chapel Hill University Press, 1993, vi + 130pp.
- Cuneiform Luvian Lexicon. Chapel Hill, N.C.: self-published, 1993, ISBN 1-5114-0969-X
- Anatolian Historical Phonology, Amsterdam: Rodopi, 1994, ISBN 90-51-83697-X
- A Grammar of the Hittite Language, Eisenbrauns, 2008, ISBN 1-57506-119-8
- A Dictionary of the Lycian Language, Ann Arbor–NY: Beech Stave Press, 2004, ISBN 0-9747927-0-5
