= Chariot =

Carriage using animals to provide rapid motive power

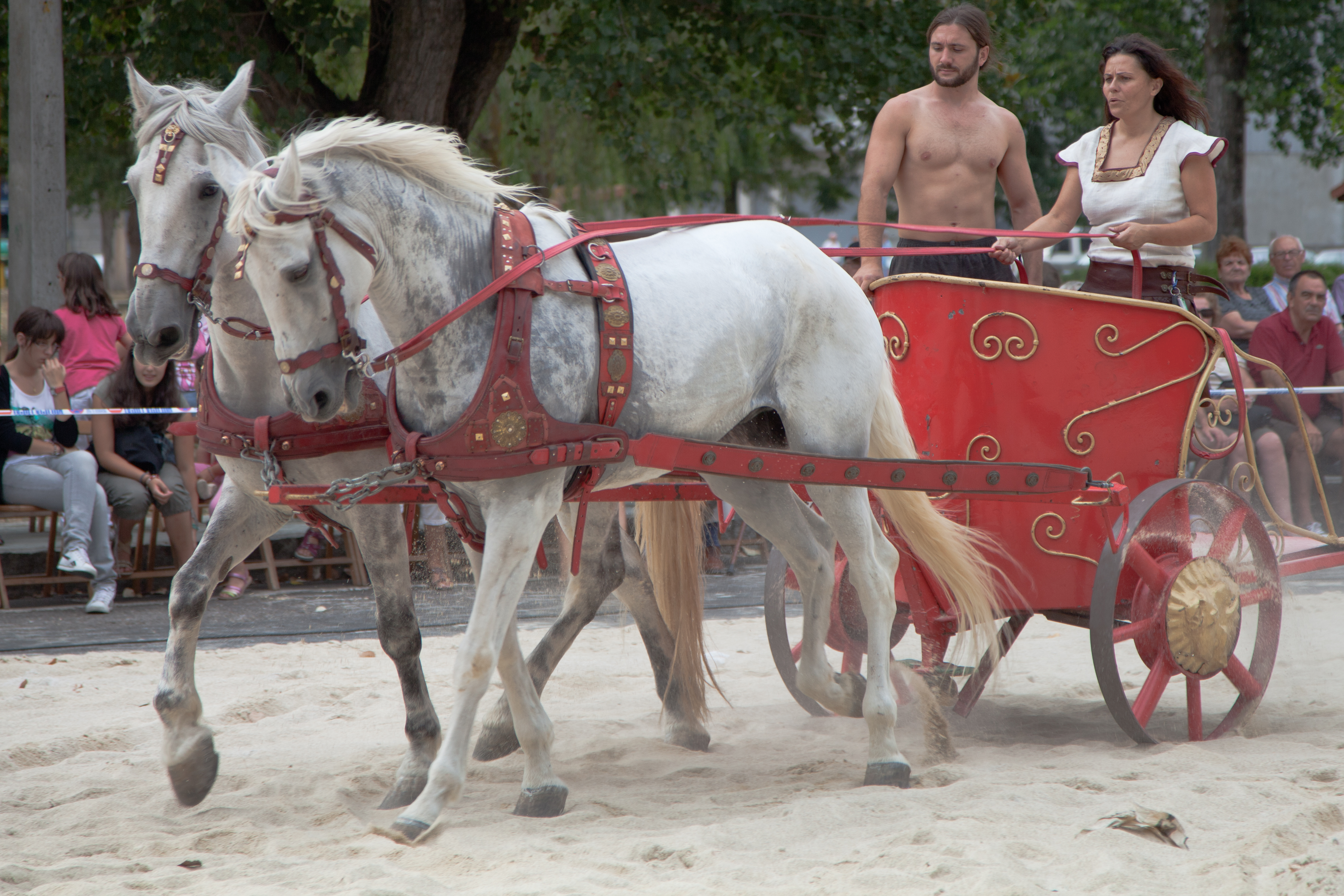
Reconstructed Roman chariot drawn by horses

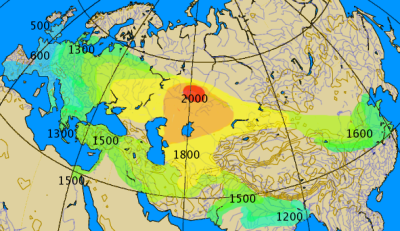
Approximate historical map of the spread of the spoke-wheeled chariot, 2000—500 BC

A chariot is a type of two-wheeled vehicle with spoked wheels, driven by a charioteer, usually using horses (Note: There were rare exceptions to the use of horses to pull chariots, for instance, the lion-pulled chariot described by Plutarch in his Life of Antony.) to provide rapid motive power for usage in warfare. The oldest known chariots have been found in burials of the Sintashta culture in modern-day Chelyabinsk Oblast, Russia, dated to c. 1950–1880 BC and are depicted on cylinder seals from Central Anatolia in Kültepe dated to c. 1900 BC. The critical invention that allowed the construction of light, horse-drawn chariots was the spoked wheel.

The chariot was a fast, light, open, two-wheeled conveyance drawn by two or more equids (usually horses) that were hitched side by side, and was little more than a floor with a waist-high guard at the front and sides. It was initially used for ancient warfare during the Bronze and Iron Ages, but after its military capabilities had been superseded by light and heavy cavalries, chariots continued to be used for travel and transport, in processions, for games, and in races.

== Etymology ==
The word "chariot" comes from the Latin term carrus through French chariot, a loanword from Gaulish karros.

In ancient Rome, a biga described a chariot requiring two horses, a triga three, and a quadriga four.

== Origins ==
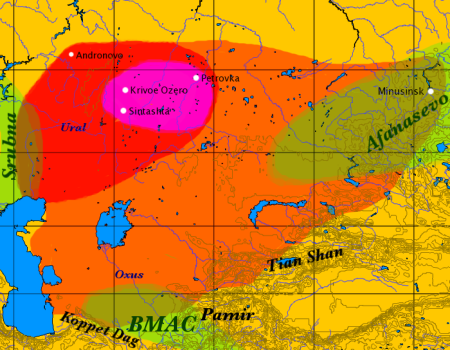
The area of the spoke-wheeled chariot finds within the Sintashta-Petrovka Proto-Indo-Iranian culture is indicated in purple.

Chariots emerged in the early 2nd millennium BC following earlier developments in wheeled transport and domestication of the horse. The earliest fully developed spoke-wheeled horse chariots are from the chariot burials of the Andronovo (Timber-Grave) sites of the Sintashta-Petrovka Proto-Indo-Iranian culture in modern Russia and Kazakhstan from around 2000 BC. However, Littauer and Crouwel (1996) and Raulwing and Burmeister (2012) disagree that the Sintashta culture vehicle finds are true chariots, but rather classed as carts.

== Indo-European world ==
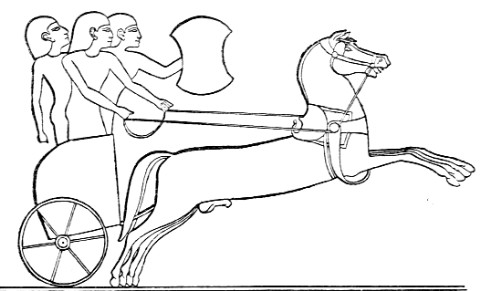
Hittite chariot (drawing of an Egyptian relief)

The oldest testimony of chariot warfare in the ancient Near East is the Old Hittite Anitta text (18th century BC), which mentions 40 teams of horses at the siege of Salatiwara. Since the text mentions teams rather than chariots, the existence of chariots in the 18th century BC is uncertain. The first certain attestation of chariots in the Hittite empire dates to the late 17th century BC (Hattusili I). A Hittite horse-training text is attributed to Kikkuli the Mitanni (15th century BC). The Hittites were renowned charioteers. They developed a chariot design that had lighter wheels, typically with four spokes, and wide enough to carry three warriors. The wheels were placed near the center of the vehicle, improving balance. One warrior usually steered, the second served as the primary archer, and the third acted as a shield-bearer or close-combat fighter.

Chariots played a major role in Late Bronze Age warfare, including in large scale engagements such as the Battle of Kadesh (c. 1274 BC) between the Hittites and the Egyptian Empire.

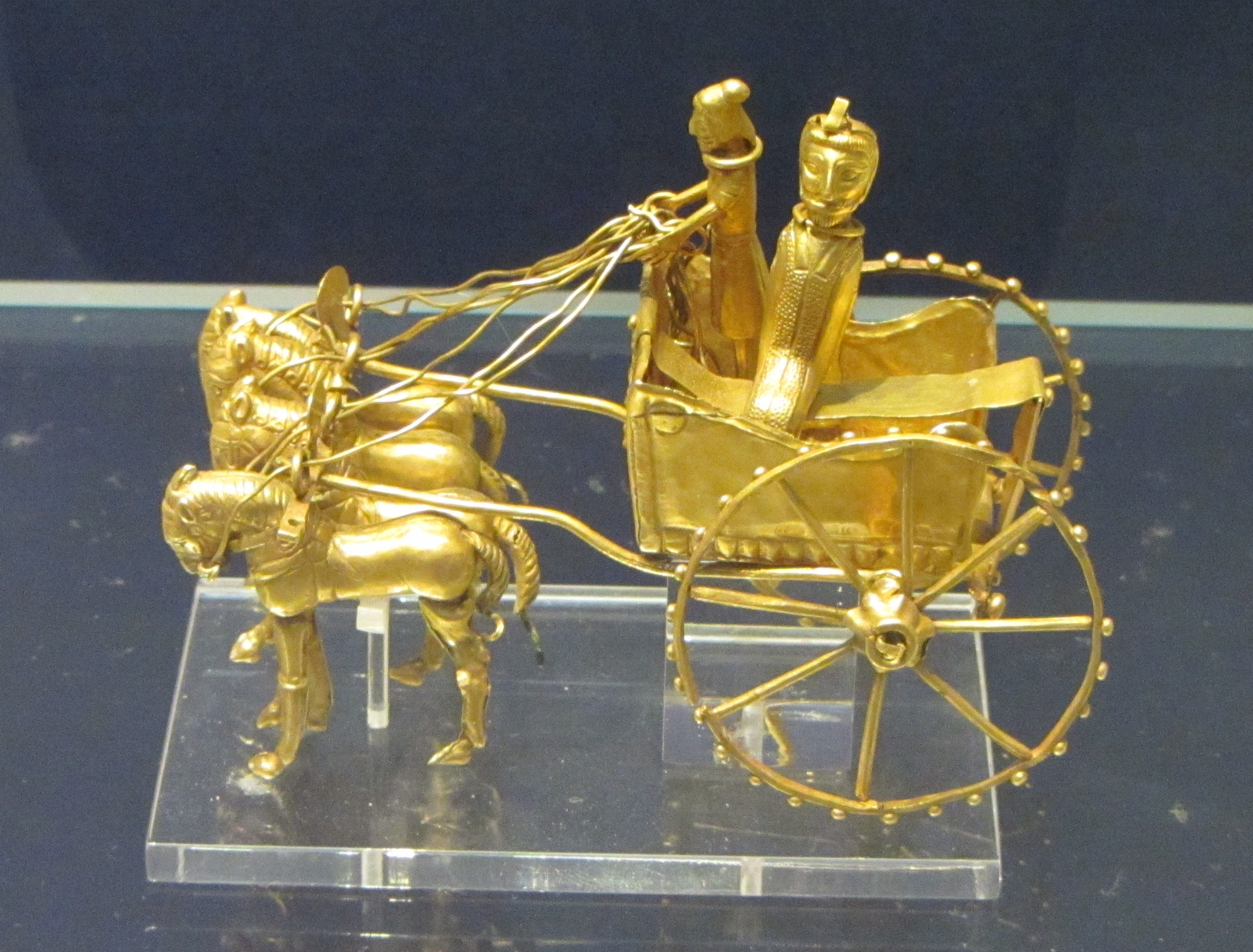
A golden chariot made during Achaemenid Empire (550–330 BC)

Horse-drawn chariots, as well as their cult and associated rituals, were spread by the Indo-Iranians, and horses and horse-drawn chariots were introduced in India by the Indo-Aryans.

Chariots are attested in Persia as early as the 2nd millennium BC. Writers describe ordinary chariots in the armies of the Achaemenid Empire. Scythed chariots appear in accounts of later battles in the 4th century BC and were operated with only a single driver.

== Near East ==
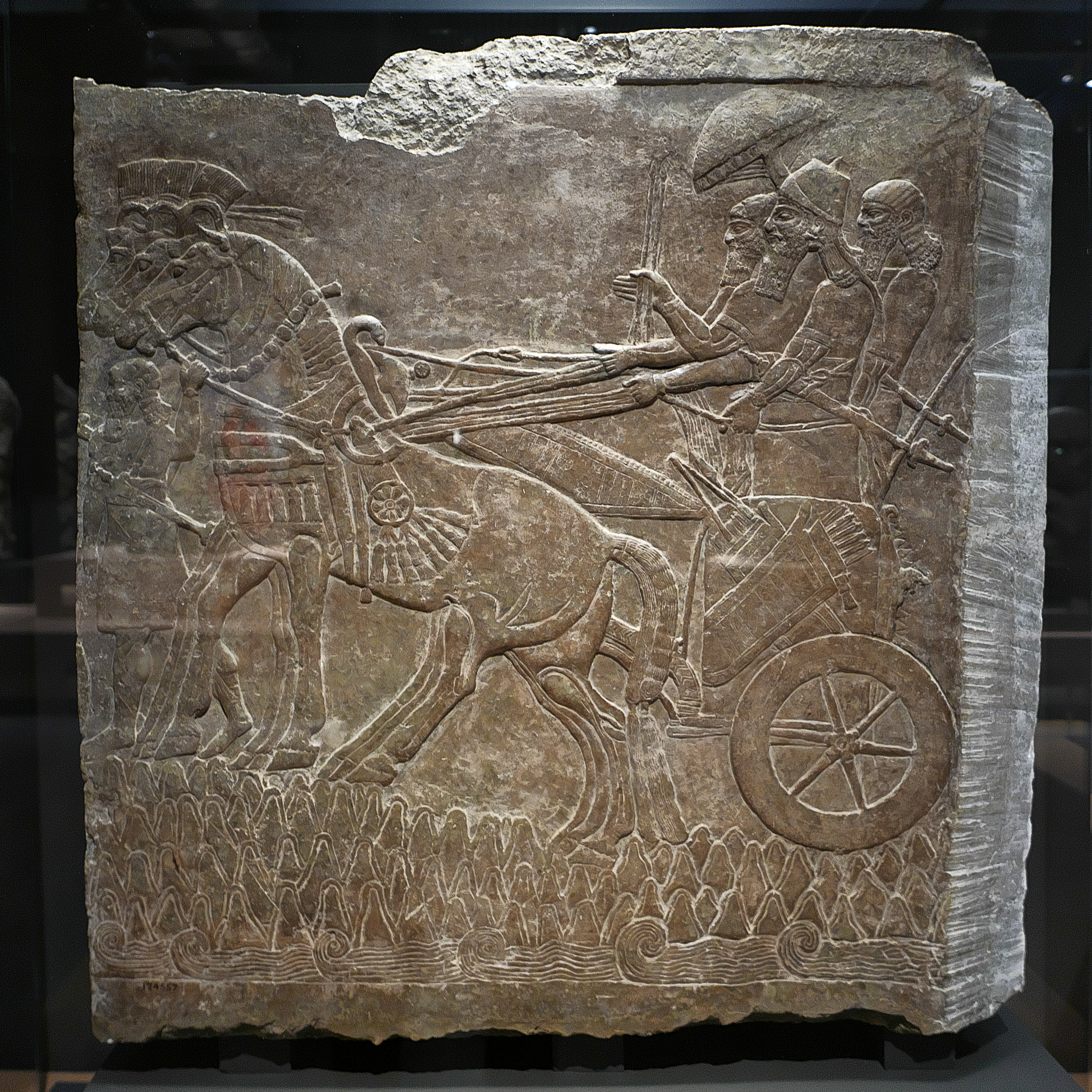
Relief of Assyrian war chariot from Nimrud, Iraq (865-860 BCE)

Chariots were introduced in the Near East in the 17(18)th–16th centuries BC. Some scholars argue that the horse chariot was most likely a product of the ancient Near East early in the 2nd millennium BC. Archaeologist Joost Crouwel writes that "Chariots were not sudden inventions, but developed out of earlier vehicles that were mounted on disk or cross-bar wheels. This development can best be traced in the Near East, where spoke-wheeled and horse-drawn chariots are first attested in the earlier part of the second millennium BC..." and were illustrated on a Syrian cylinder seal dated to either the 18th or 17th century BC.

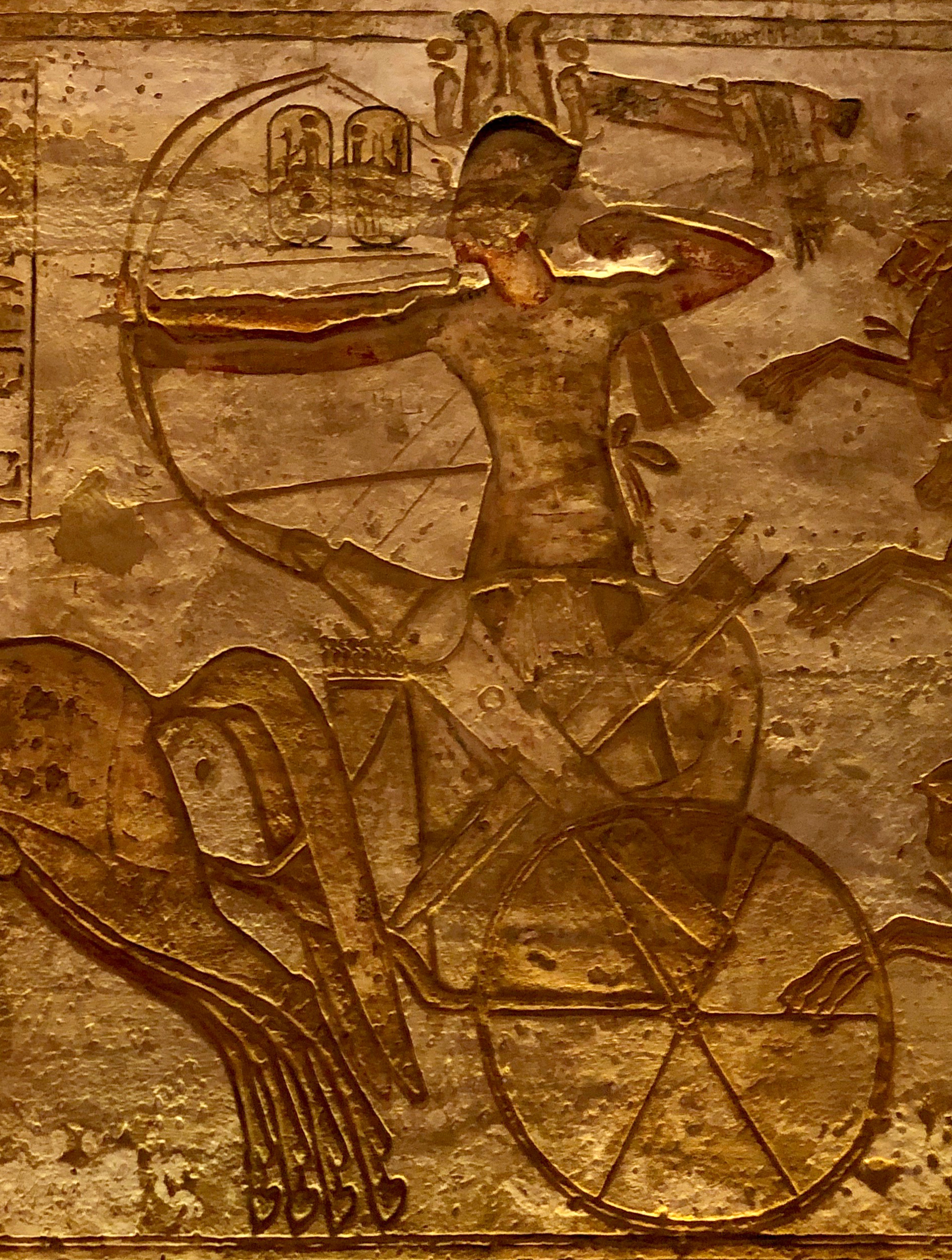
13th century relief shows two archers, one with the reins tied around the waist to free both hands

Chariot use made its way into Egypt around 1650 BC during the Hyksos invasion of Egypt and establishment of the Fourteenth Dynasty. The chariot and horse were used extensively in Egypt by the Hyksos invaders from the 16th century BC onwards. In the remains of Egyptian and Assyrian art, there are numerous representations of chariots, which display rich ornamentation. The chariots of the Egyptians and Assyrians, with whom the bow was the principal arm of attack, were richly mounted with quivers full of arrows. The Egyptians invented the yoke saddle harnessing method around 1500 BC. As a general rule, the Egyptians used chariots as mobile archery platforms. Chariots always had two men, with the driver steering the chariot with his reins while the main archer aimed his bow and arrow at any targets within range. The best preserved examples of Egyptian chariots are the four specimens from the tomb of Tutankhamun.

By the 7th century BC, the Neo-Assyrian Empire operated large heavy chariots with a crew of four—a driver, an archer, and two shield-bearers—often drawn by teams of three or four horses. These vehicles are documented in palace reliefs from Nimrud and Nineveh. Their increasing weight and complexity contributed to the growing preference for cavalry, which gradually replaced chariots in Near Eastern warfare.

Archaeological finds attest to chariot use in the region, including a decorated bronze lynchpin thought to belong to a Canaanite chariot, and the identification of Jezreel as a possible chariot base of King Ahab.

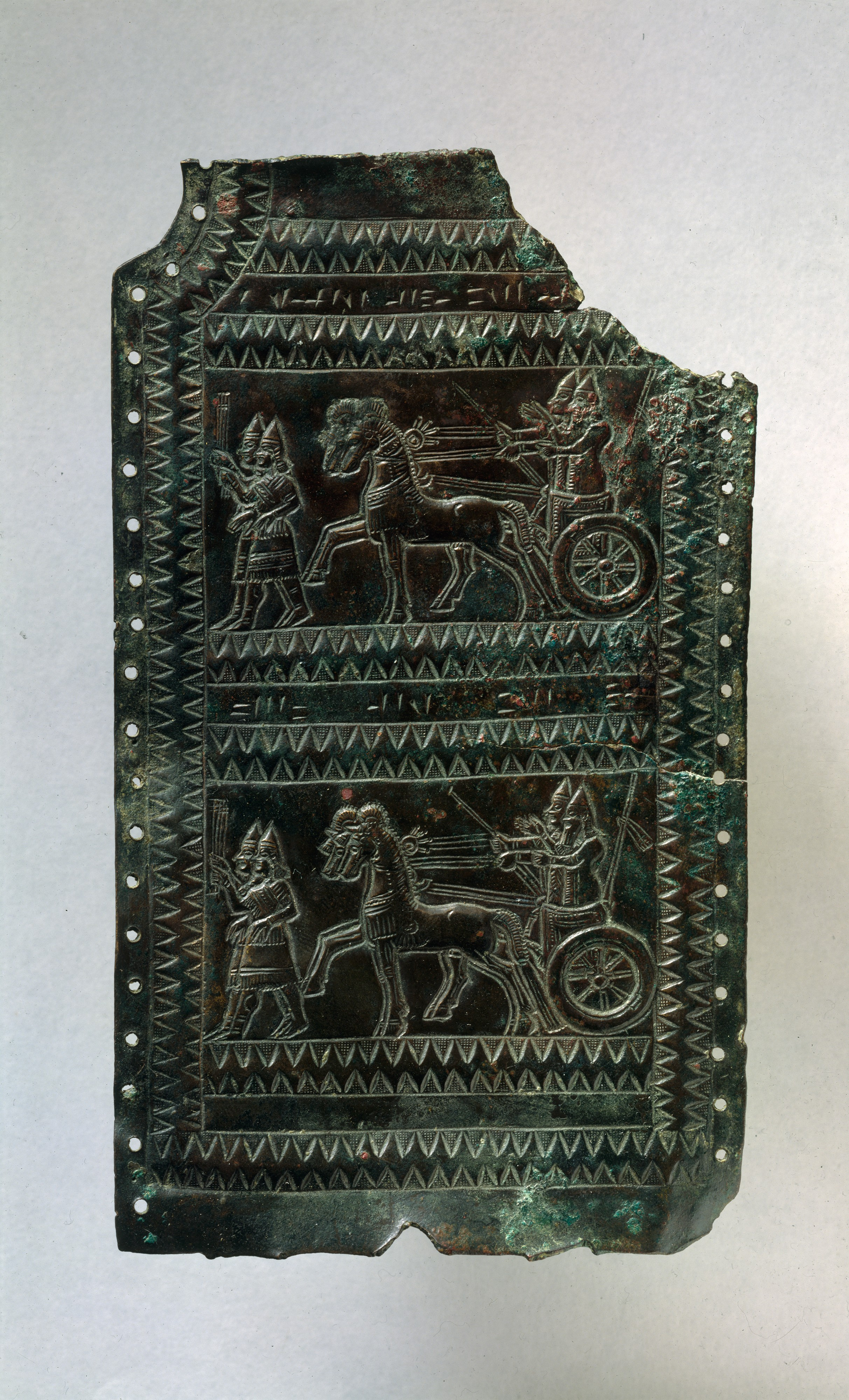
Bronze Urartian plaque fragment, circa 713–679 BC

In Urartu (860–590 BC), the chariot was used by both the nobility and the military. In Erebuni (Yerevan), King Argishti of Urartu is depicted riding on a chariot with eight-spoked wheels and pulled by two horses.

== Bronze-Age Europe ==
As David W. Anthony writes in his book The Horse, the Wheel, and Language, in Eastern Europe, the earliest well-dated depiction of a wheeled vehicle (a wagon with two axles and four wheels) is on the Bronocice pot (c. 3500 BC). It is a clay pot excavated in a Funnelbeaker settlement in Swietokrzyskie Voivodeship in Poland. The oldest securely dated real wheel-axle combination in Eastern Europe is the Ljubljana Marshes Wheel (c. 3150 BC).

=== Greece ===
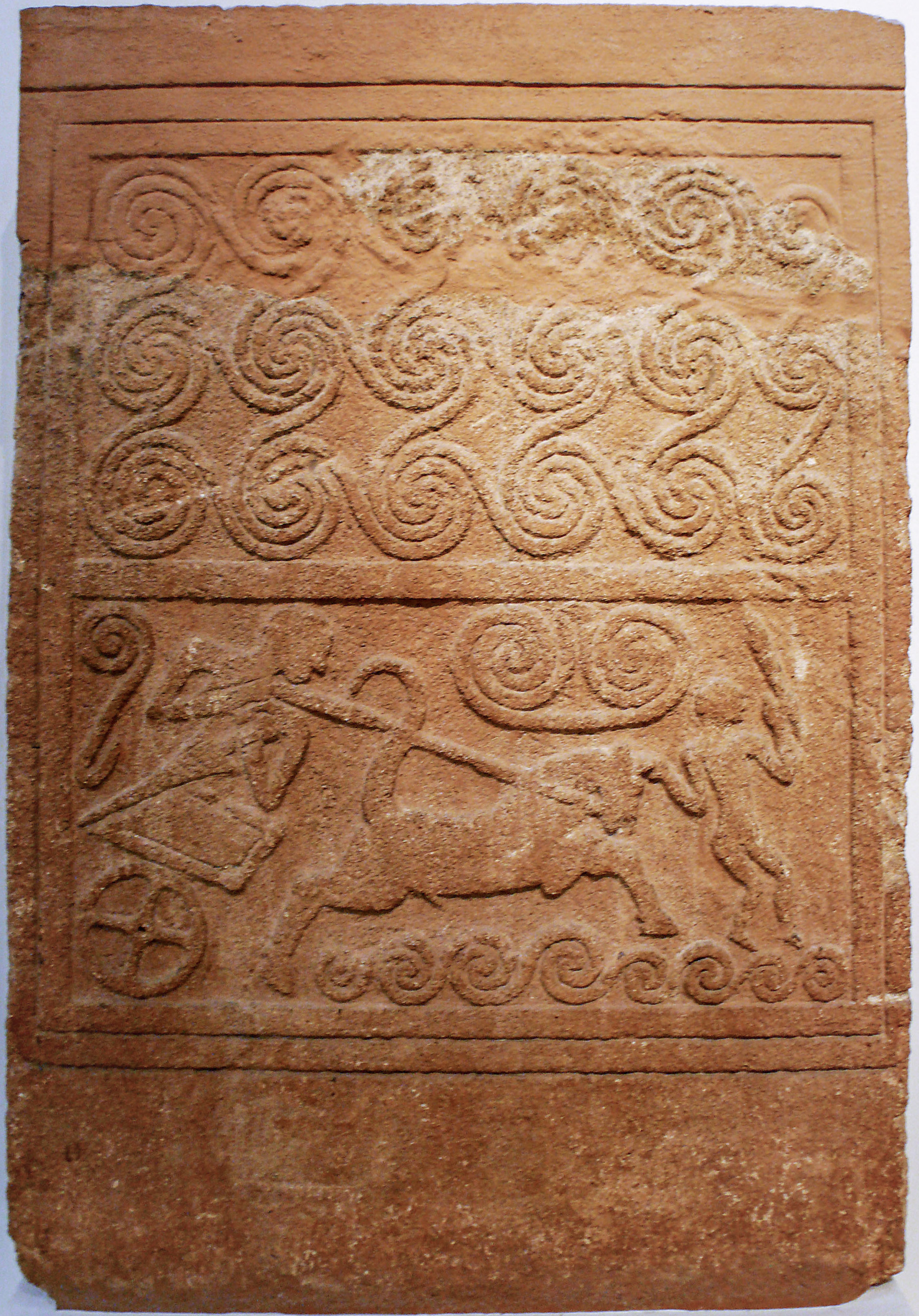
Stone stele from Grave Circle A at Mycenae, c. 1600 BC

The later Greeks of the first millennium BC had a (still not very effective) cavalry arm, and the rocky terrain of the Greek mainland was unsuitable for wheeled vehicles. The chariot was heavily used by the Mycenaean Greeks, most probably adopted from the Hittites, around 1600 BC. Linear B tablets from Mycenaean palaces record large inventories of chariots, sometimes with specific details as to how many chariots were assembled or not (i.e. stored in modular form). On a gravestone from the royal Shaft-grave V in Mycenae dated LH II (about 1500 BC) there is one of the earliest depiction of the chariot in Achaean art. This sculpture shows a single man driving a two-wheeled small box chariot. Later the vehicles were used in games and processions, notably for races at the Olympic and Panathenaic Games and other public festivals in ancient Greece, in hippodromes and in contests called agons. They were also used in ceremonial functions, as when a paranymph, or friend of a bridegroom, went with him in a chariot to fetch the bride home.

Greek chariots were made to be drawn by two horses attached to a central pole. If two additional horses were added, they were attached on each side of the main pair by a single bar or trace fastened to the front or prow of the chariot, as may be seen on two prize vases in the British Museum from the Panathenaic Games at Athens, Greece, in which the driver is seated with feet resting on a board hanging down in front close to the legs of the horses. The biga itself consists of a seat resting on the axle, with a rail at each side to protect the driver from the wheels. Greek chariots appear to have lacked any other attachment for the horses, which would have made turning difficult.

The body or basket of the chariot rested directly on the axle (called beam) connecting the two wheels. There was no suspension or springs, making this an uncomfortable form of transport. At the front and sides of the basket was a semicircular guard about 3 ft (1 m) high, to give some protection from enemy attack. At the back the basket was open, making it easy to mount and dismount. There was no seat, and generally only enough standing room for the driver and one other person.

The reins were made of leather and ornamented with studs of ivory or metal. The reins passed through rings attached to the collar bands or yoke, and were long enough to be tied round the waist of the charioteer, allowing him to use his hands for weapons.

The wheels and basket of the chariot were usually of wood, strengthened in places with bronze or iron. The wheels had four to eight spokes, and tires of bronze or iron. Due to the widely spaced spokes, the rim of the chariot wheel was held in tension over comparatively large spans. While this provided a small measure of shock absorption, it also necessitated the removal of the wheels when the chariot was not in use, to prevent deforming under the weight of the vehicle. Most other nations of this time had chariots of similar design to the Greeks, the chief differences being the fittings.

Greek chariot scenes in art, 8th to 4th centuries BC

Procession of chariots on an amphora from Athens (c. 720–700 BC).

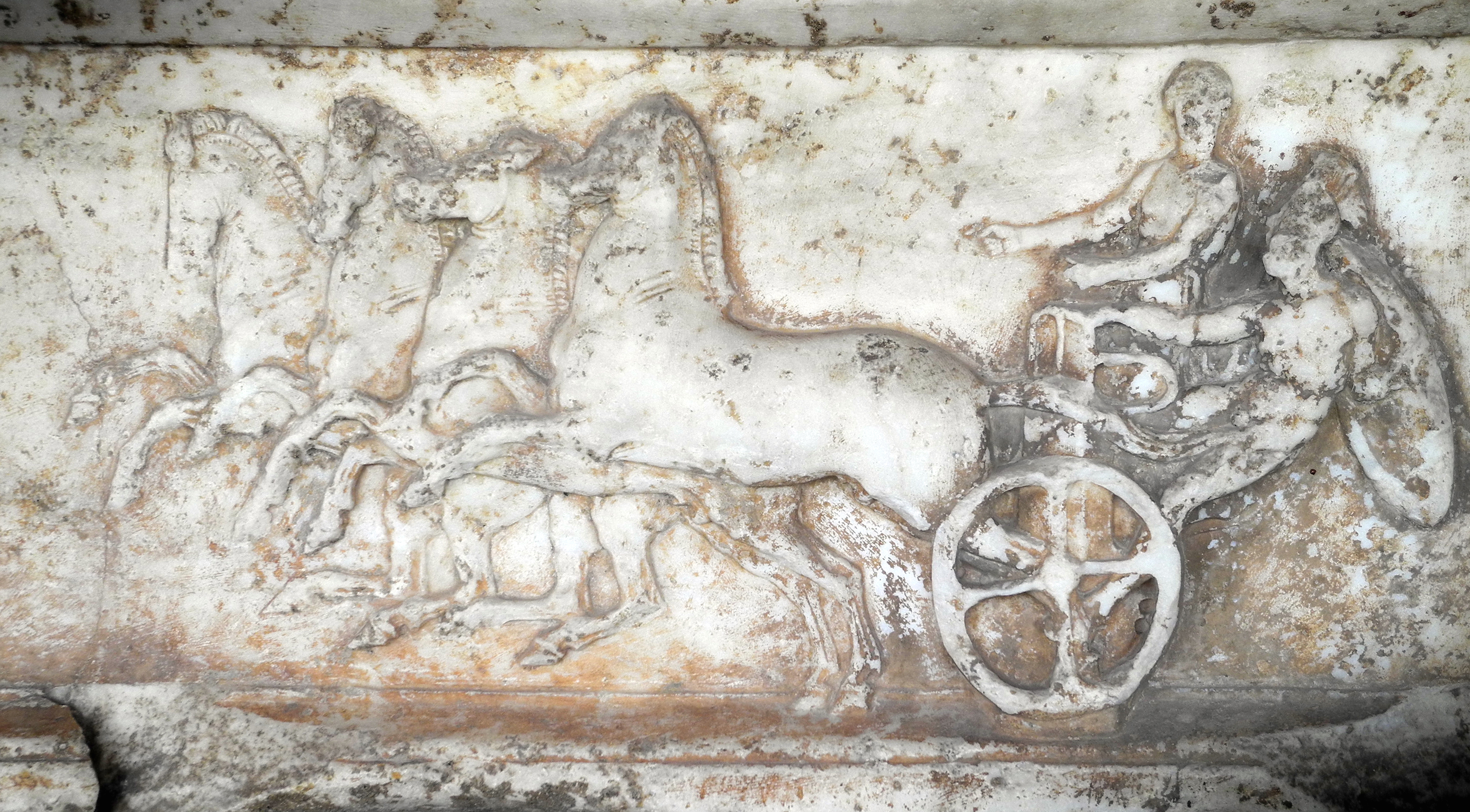
Greek relief of an armed warrior and his driver (4th century BC)

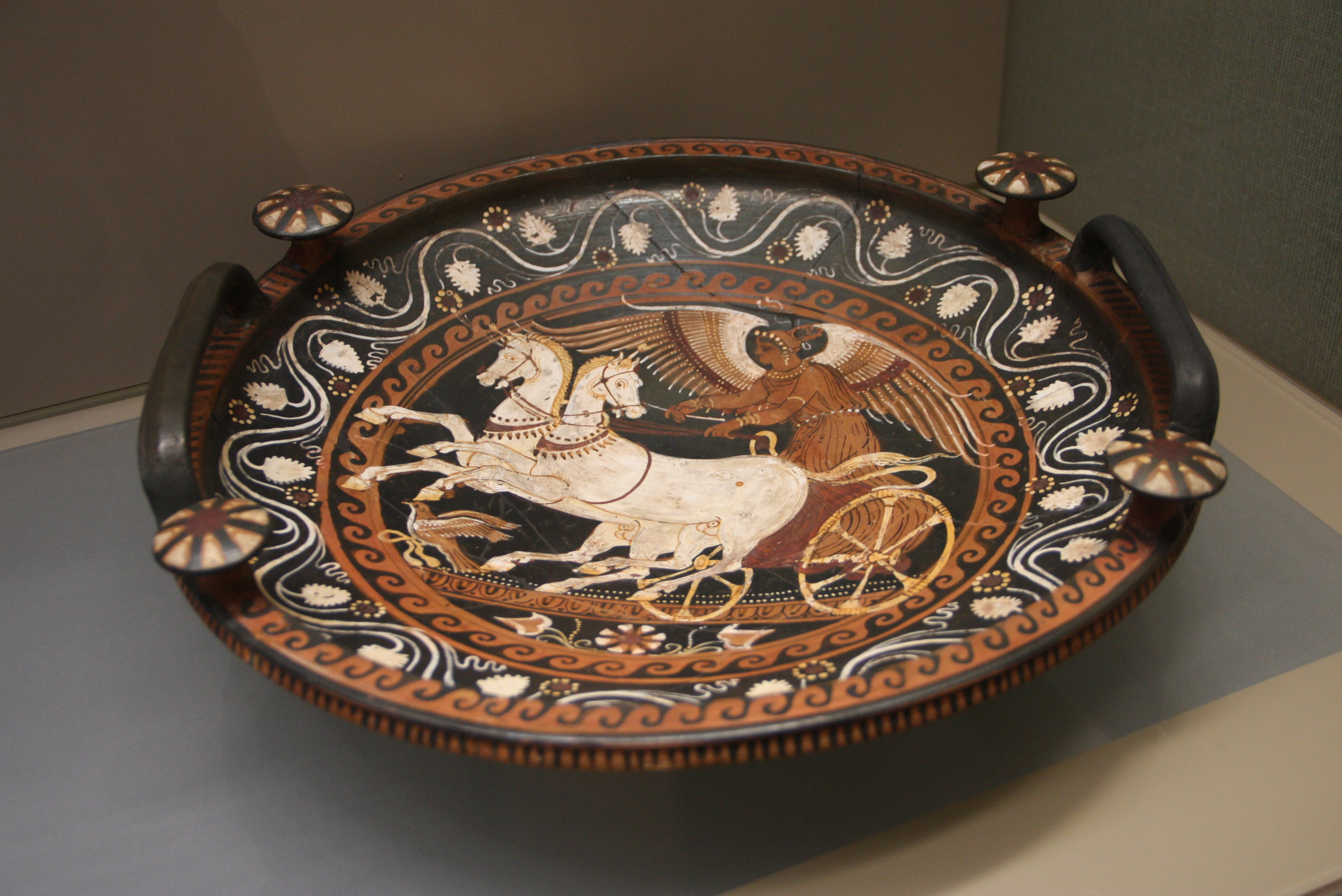
Patera (tray) depicting the goddess Nike driving a chariot, Magna Graecia (4th century BC)

=== Northern Europe ===
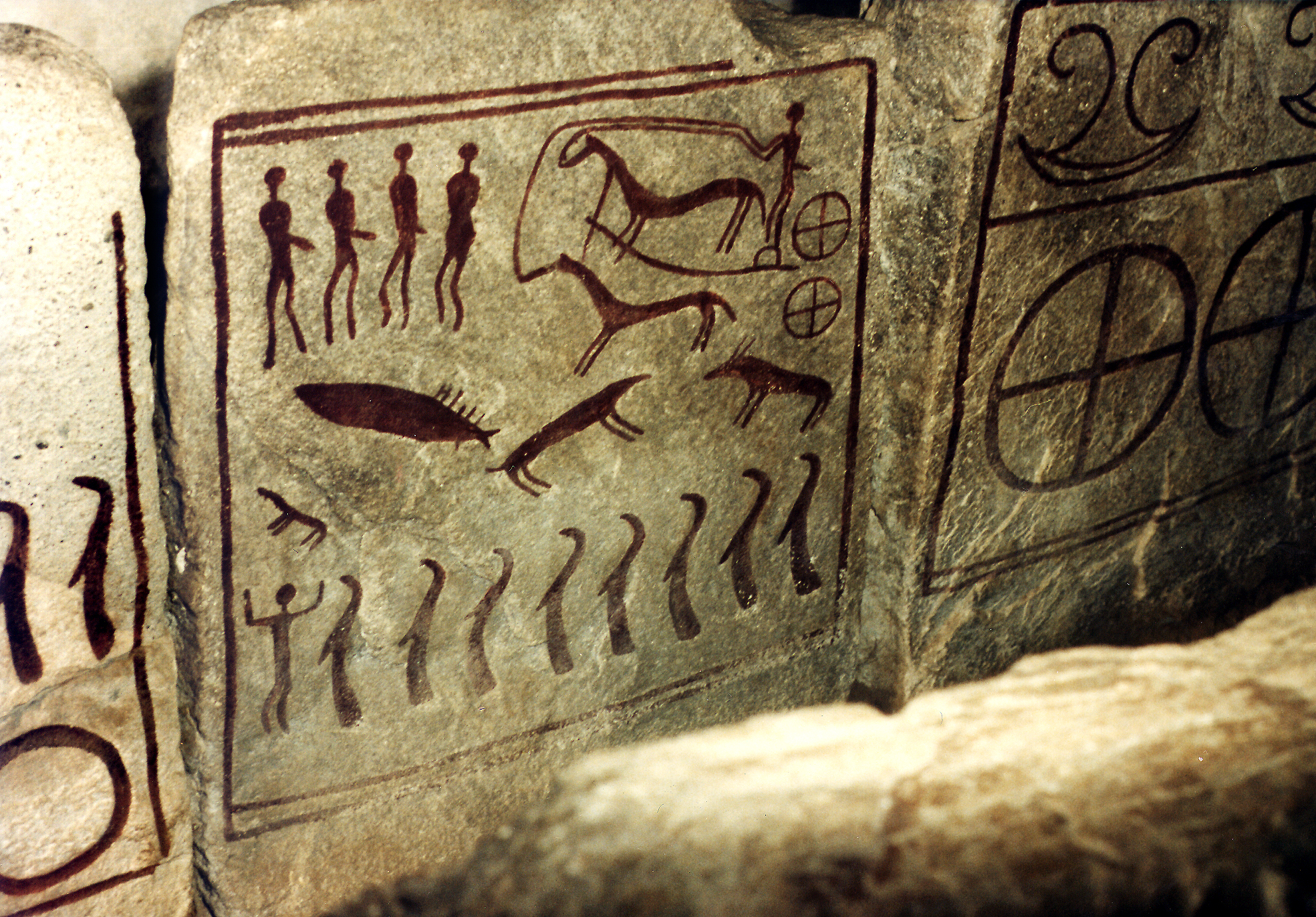
A petroglyph in Sweden

The Kivik grave is an archaeological find in Sweden with several petroglyphs from the Nordic Bronze Age. One stone slab depicts a two-wheeled vehicle often interpreted as a biga chariot.

=== Western Europe ===
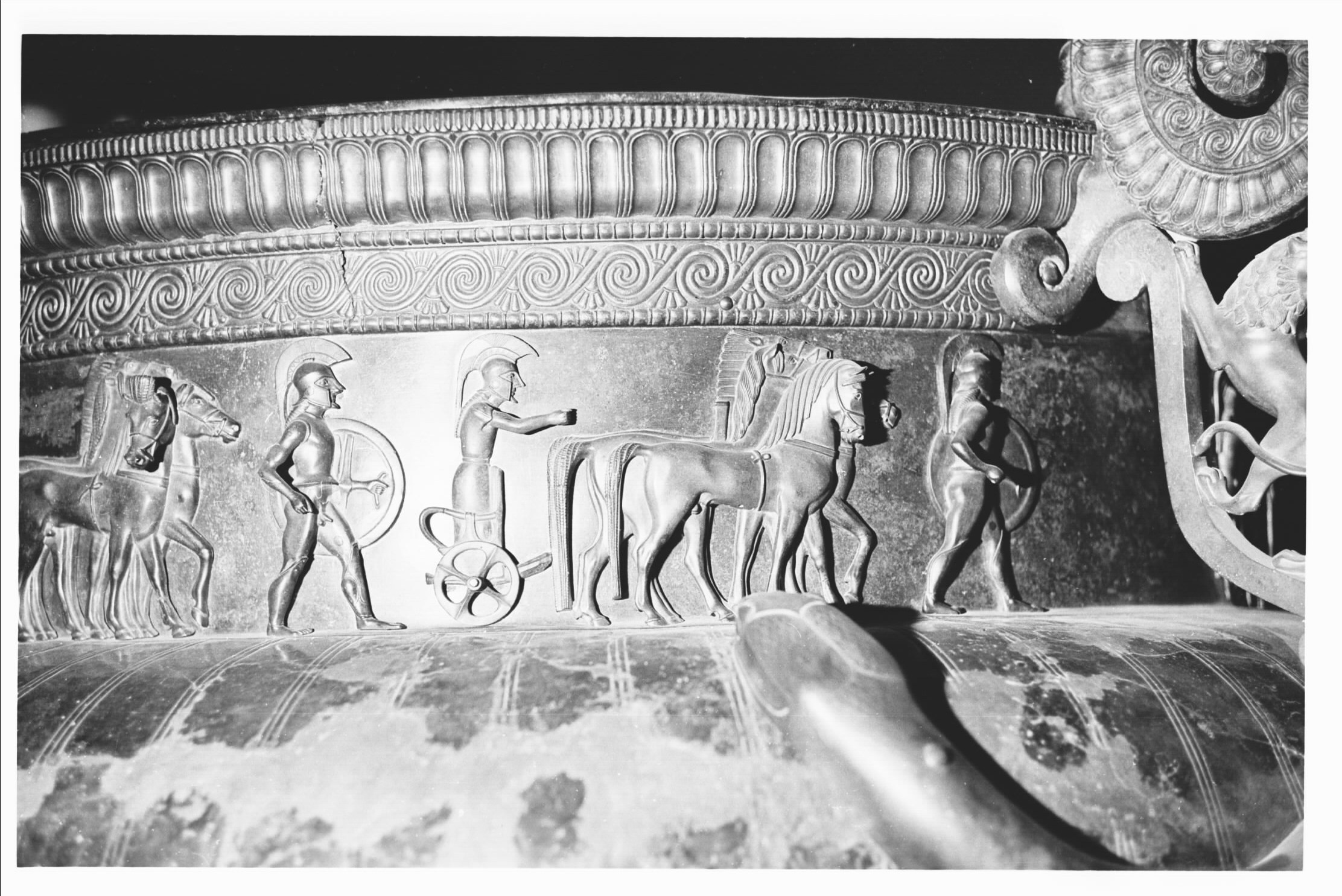
Procession of chariots and warriors on the Vix krater (c. 510 BC), a vessel of Archaic Greek workmanship found in a Gallic burial

Some 20 Iron Age chariot burials have been excavated in Britain, roughly dating from between 500 BC and 100 BC. Virtually all of them were found in East Yorkshire – the exception was a find in 2001 in Newbridge, 10 km west of Edinburgh.

The Celtic chariot, which may have been called karbantos in Gaulish (compare Latin carpentum), was a biga that measured approximately 2 m (6 ft 6 3/4 in) in width and 4 m (13 ft 1 1/2 in) in length.

British chariots were open at the front and are described in detail by Julius Caesar, who noted their mobility, noise, and the practice of warriors dismounting to fight on foot while the charioteer withdrew to a safe distance. (Note: Julius Caesar (translation): "Their mode of fighting with their chariots is this: firstly, they drive about in all directions and throw their weapons and generally break the ranks of the enemy with the very dread of their horses and the noise of their wheels; and when they have worked themselves in between the troops of horse, leap from their chariots and engage on foot. The charioteers in the meantime withdraw some little distance from the battle, and so place themselves with the chariots that, if their masters are overpowered by the number of the enemy, they may have a ready retreat to their own troops. Thus they display in battle the speed of horse, [together with] the firmness of infantry; and by daily practice and exercise attain to such expertness that they are accustomed, even on a declining and steep place, to check their horses at full speed, and manage and turn them in an instant and run along the pole, and stand on the yoke, and thence betake themselves with the greatest celerity to their chariots again.)

Chariots were also used for ceremonial purposes. According to Tacitus (Annals 14.35), Boudica, queen of the Iceni and a number of other tribes in a formidable uprising against the occupying Roman forces, addressed her troops from a chariot in 61 CE. (Note: Quotation: (in Latin) Boudicca curru filias prae se vehens, ut quamque nationem accesserat, solitum quidem Britannis feminarum ductu bellare testabatur. Translation: Boudicca, carrying her daughters before her in a chariot, went up to each tribe in turn, declaring that it was indeed customary for Britons to fight under the leadership of women.)

The last mention of chariot use in battle seems to be at the Battle of Mons Graupius, somewhere in modern Scotland, in 84 CE. From Tacitus (Agricola 1.35–36) "The plain between resounded with the noise and with the rapid movements of chariots and cavalry." The chariots did not win even their initial engagement with the Roman auxiliaries: "Meantime the enemy's cavalry had fled, and the charioteers had mingled in the engagement of the infantry."

=== Etruria ===
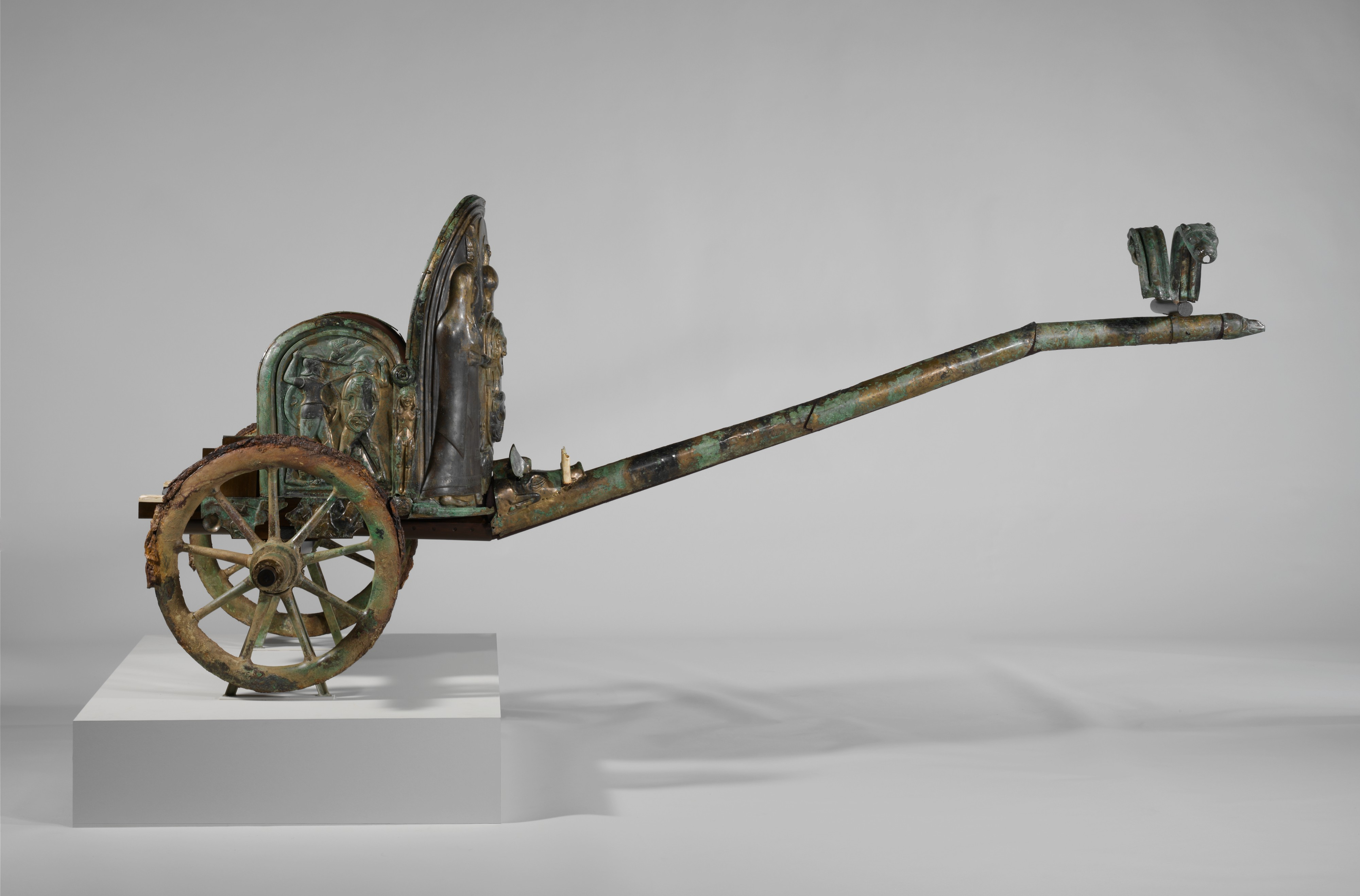
The Monteleone Chariot at the Met (c. 530 BC)

The Monteleone chariot is the only surviving complete Etruscan chariot which dates to c. 530 BC. It was uncovered as part of a chariot burial at Monteleone di Spoleto. Currently in the collection of the Metropolitan Museum of Art, it is decorated with bronze plates decorated with detailed low-relief scenes, commonly interpreted as depicting episodes from the life of Achilles.

=== Rome ===
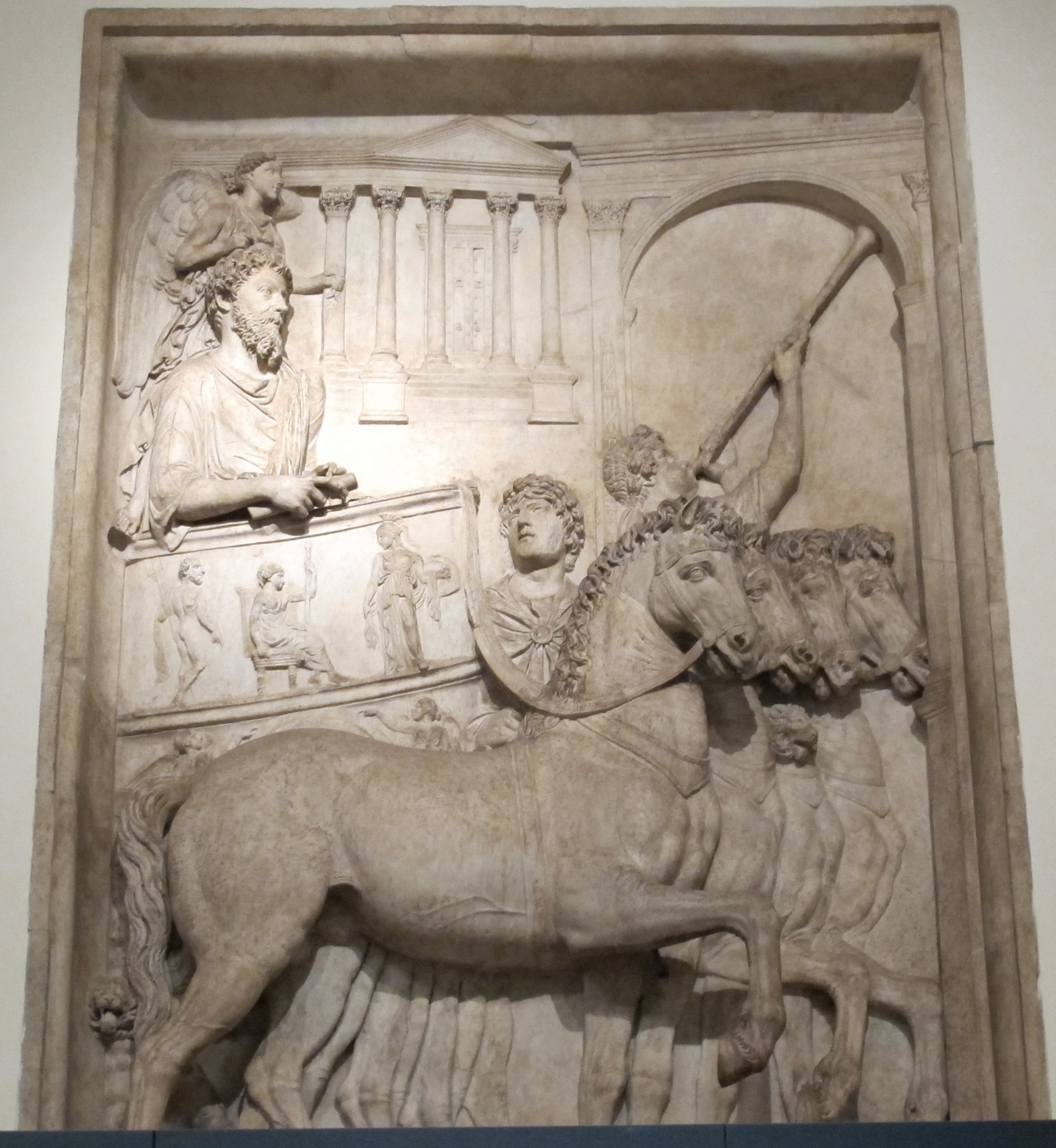
Bas relief of Marcus Aurelius in a triumphal quadriga (c. 176–180 CE)

In the Roman Empire, chariots were no longer used in warfare. They were used in chariot racing in the Roman circuses, and in triumphal processions, where they were typically drawn by four horses—a configuration known as a quadriga. A three-horse chariot was a triga, and a two-horse chariot a biga.

There were four factions of charioteers, distinguished by the colour of their costumes. The main centre of chariot racing was the Circus Maximus. The track could hold 12 chariots, and the two sides of the track were separated by a raised median termed the spina. Chariot races continued to enjoy great popularity until their decline in the 6th century.

== Ancient China ==
The earliest archaeological evidence of chariots in China, a chariot burial site discovered in 1933 at Hougang, Anyang in Henan, dates to the rule of King Wu Ding of the Late Shang (c. 1250 BC). Oracle bone inscriptions suggest that the western enemies of the Shang used limited numbers of chariots in battle, but the Shang themselves used them only as mobile command vehicles and in royal hunts.

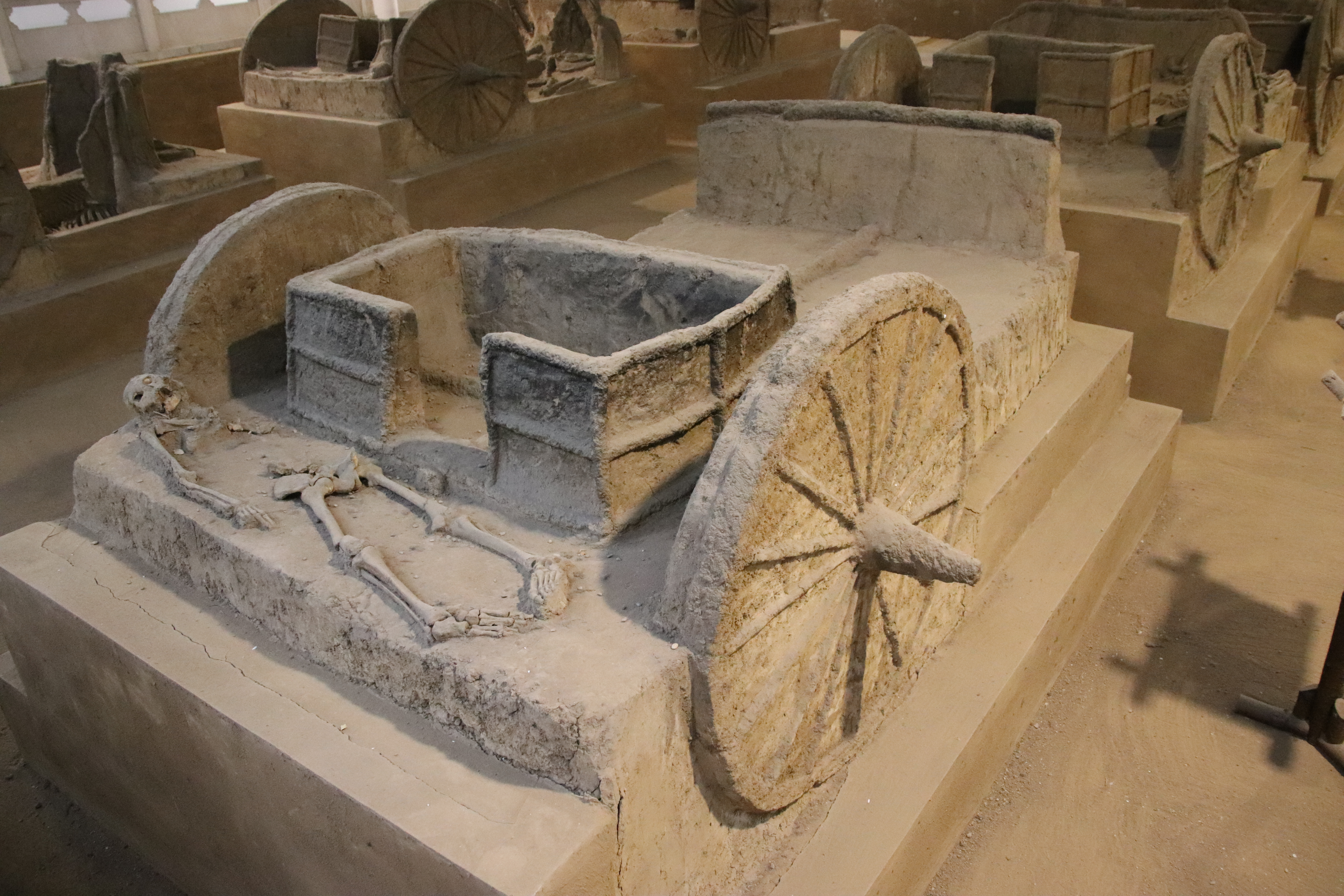
War chariots at Shang dynasty Yinxu ruins, c. 1200 BC

During the Shang dynasty, members of the royal family were buried with attendants, including a chariot, horses, and a charioteer. A Shang chariot was often drawn by two horses, but four-horse variants are occasionally found in burials.

Jacques Gernet claims that the Zhou dynasty, which conquered the Shang ca. 1046 BC, made more use of the chariot than did the Shang and "invented a new kind of harness with four horses abreast". The crew consisted of an archer, a driver, and sometimes a third warrior who was armed with a spear or dagger-axe. From the 8th to 5th centuries BC the Chinese use of chariots reached its peak. Although chariots appeared in greater numbers, infantry often defeated charioteers in battle.

Massed-chariot warfare became all but obsolete after the Warring-States period (476–221 BC). The main reasons were increased use of the crossbow, use of long halberds up to 18 feet (5.49 m) long and pikes up to 22 feet (6.71 m) long, and the adoption of standard cavalry units, and the adaptation of mounted archery from nomadic cavalry, which were more effective. Chariots would continue to serve as command posts for officers during the Qin dynasty (221–206 BC) and the Han dynasty (206 BC–220 AD), while armored chariots were also used during the Han dynasty against the Xiongnu Confederation in the Han–Xiongnu War (133 BC to 89 AD), specifically at the Battle of Mobei (119 BC).

Before the Han dynasty, the power of Chinese states and dynasties was often measured by the number of chariots they were known to have. A country of a thousand chariots ranked as a medium country, and a country of ten thousand chariots ranked as a huge and powerful country.

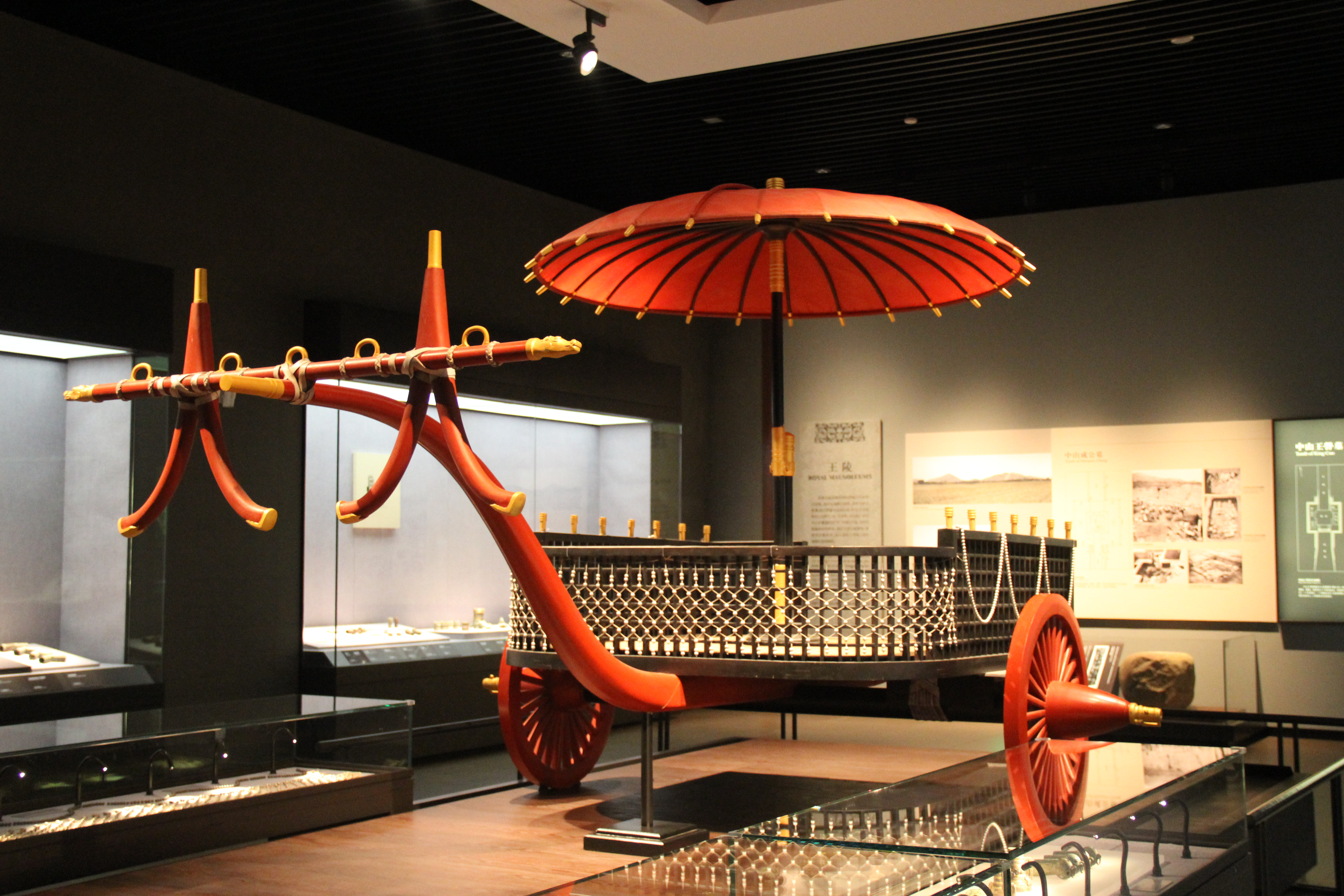
Model of a chariot, Warring States period

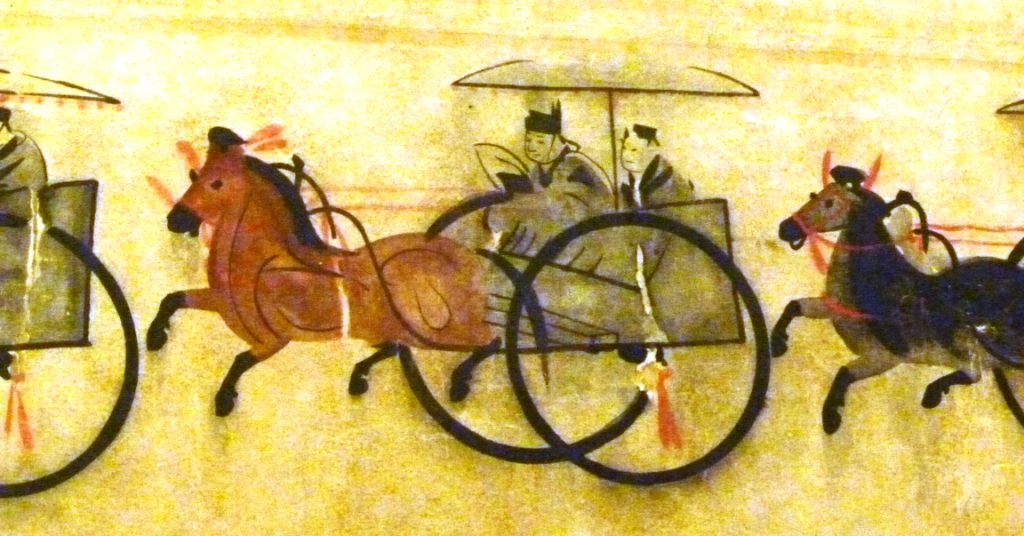
Powerful landlord in chariot (Eastern Han, 25–220 AD, Anping County, Hebei).

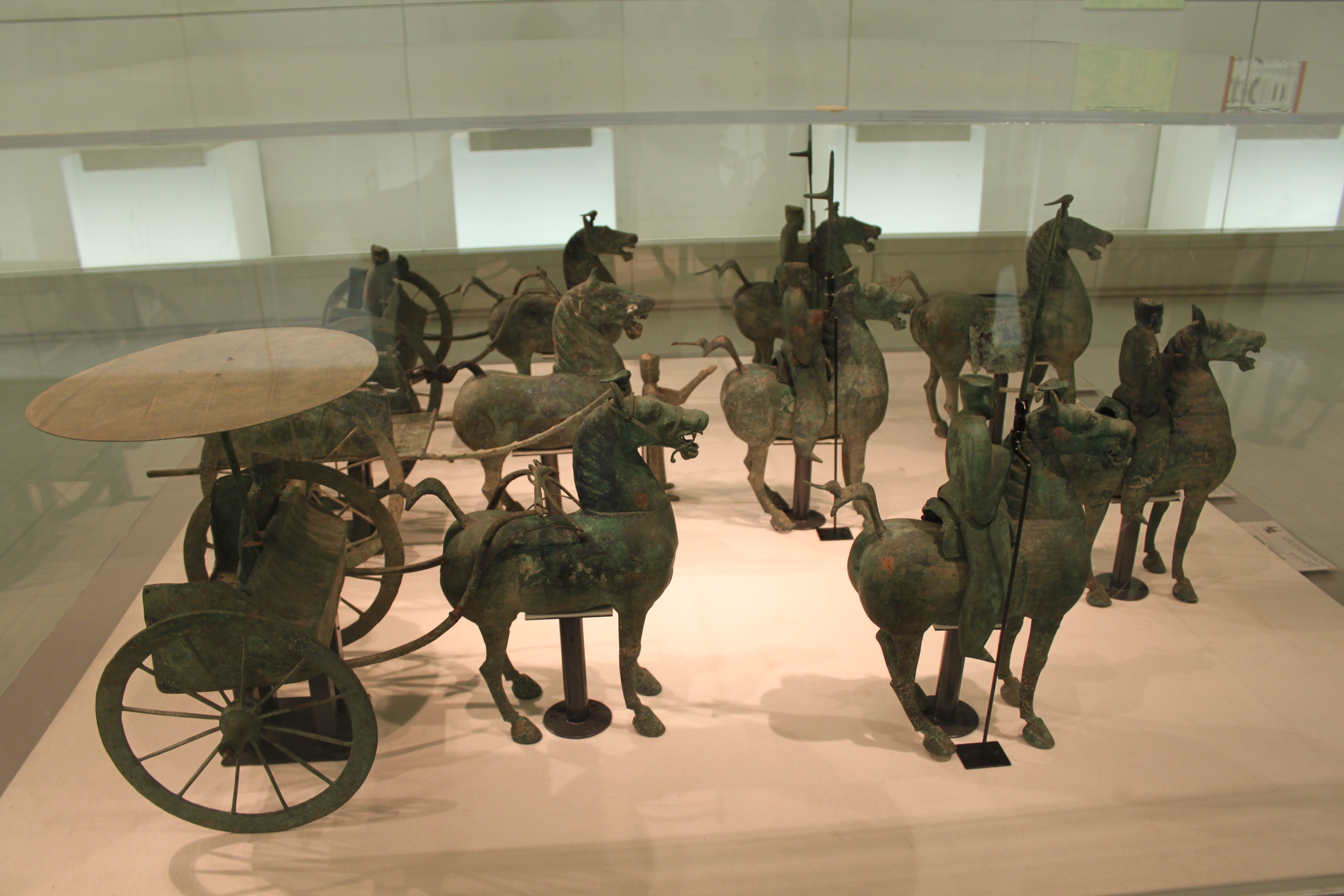
Han dynasty bronze models of cavalry and chariots

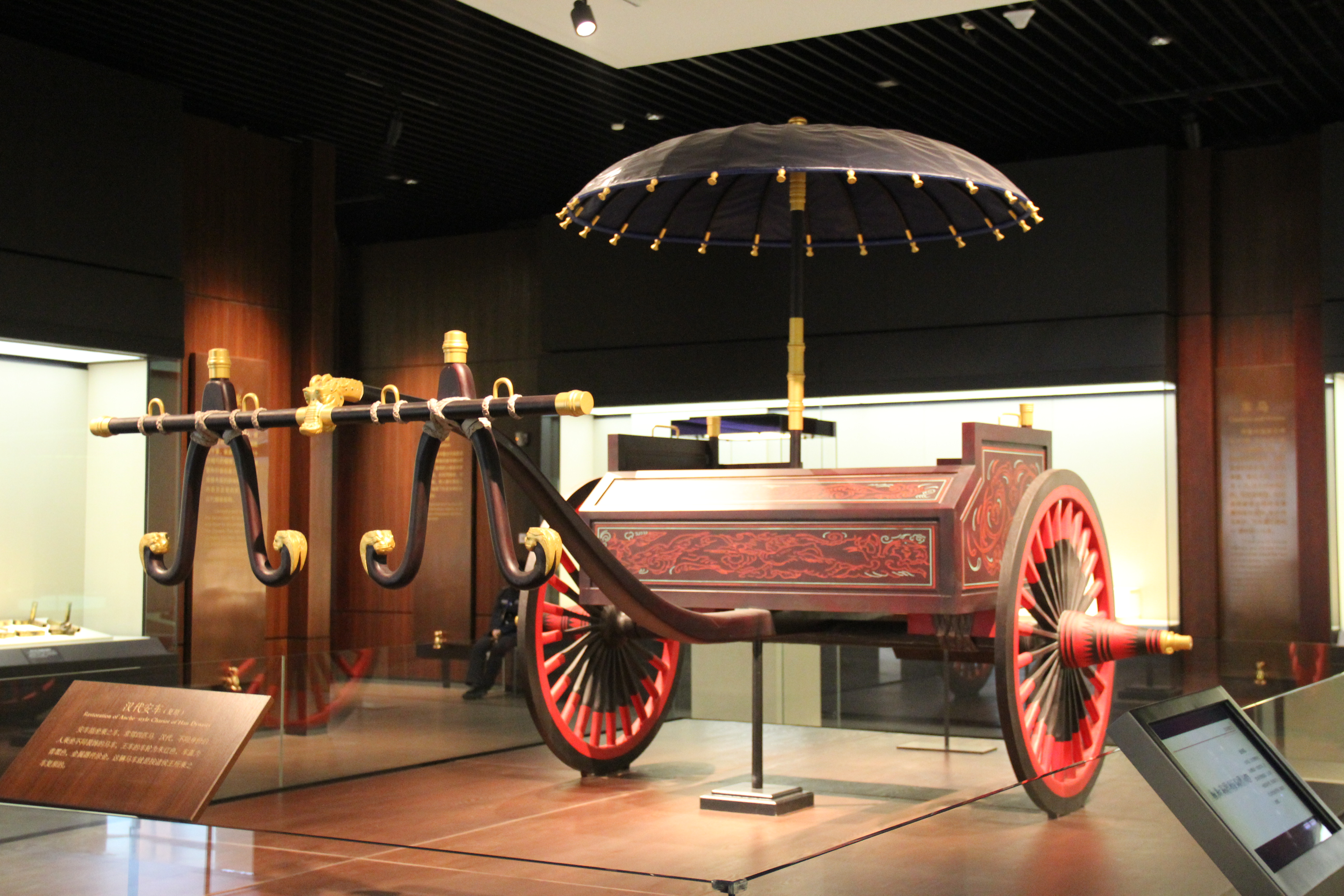
Model recreation of Han dynasty chariot, from Tomb of Liu Sheng

== Mythology and religion ==
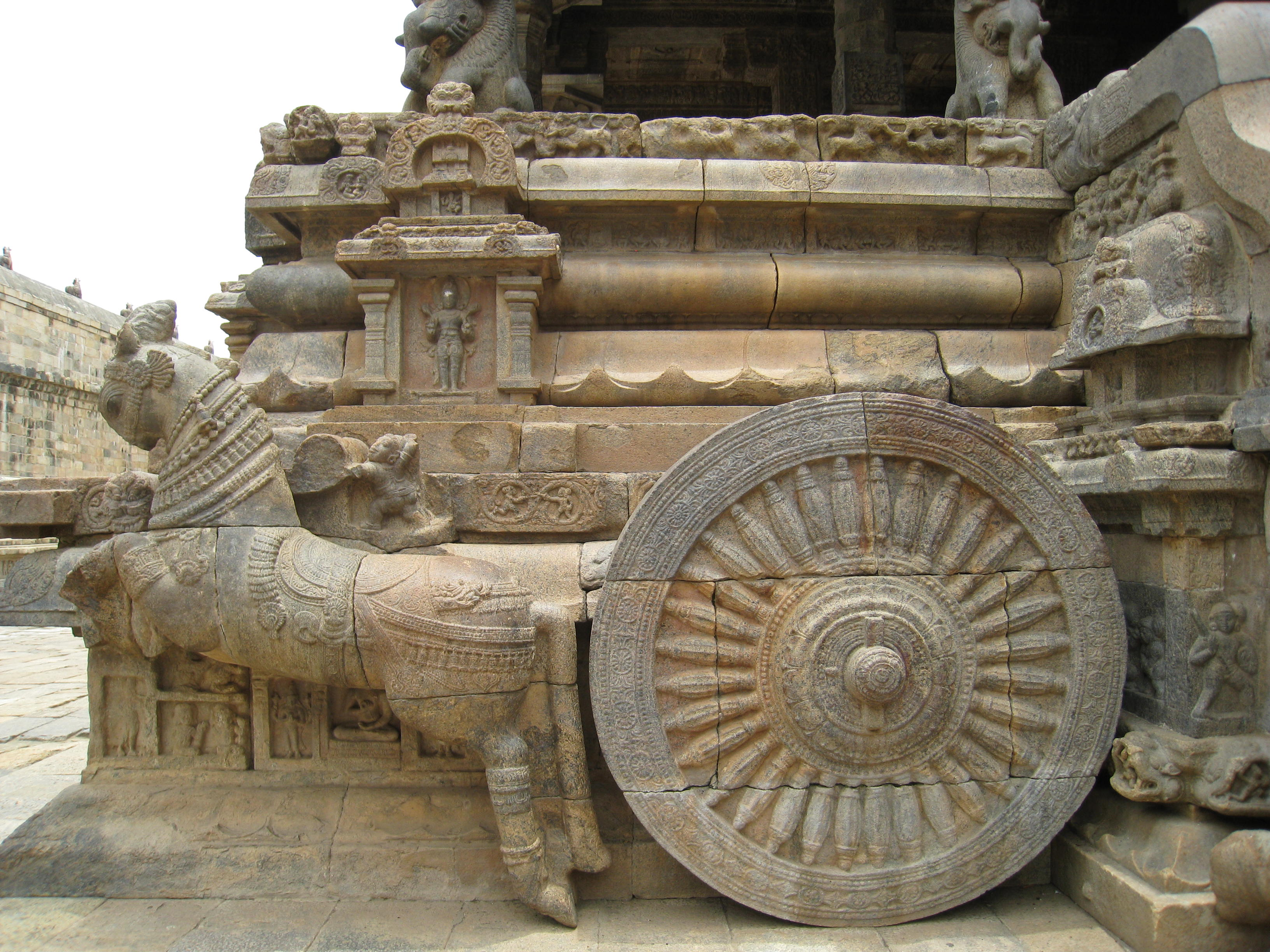
Chariot detail at Airavatesvara Temple built in the 12th century AD

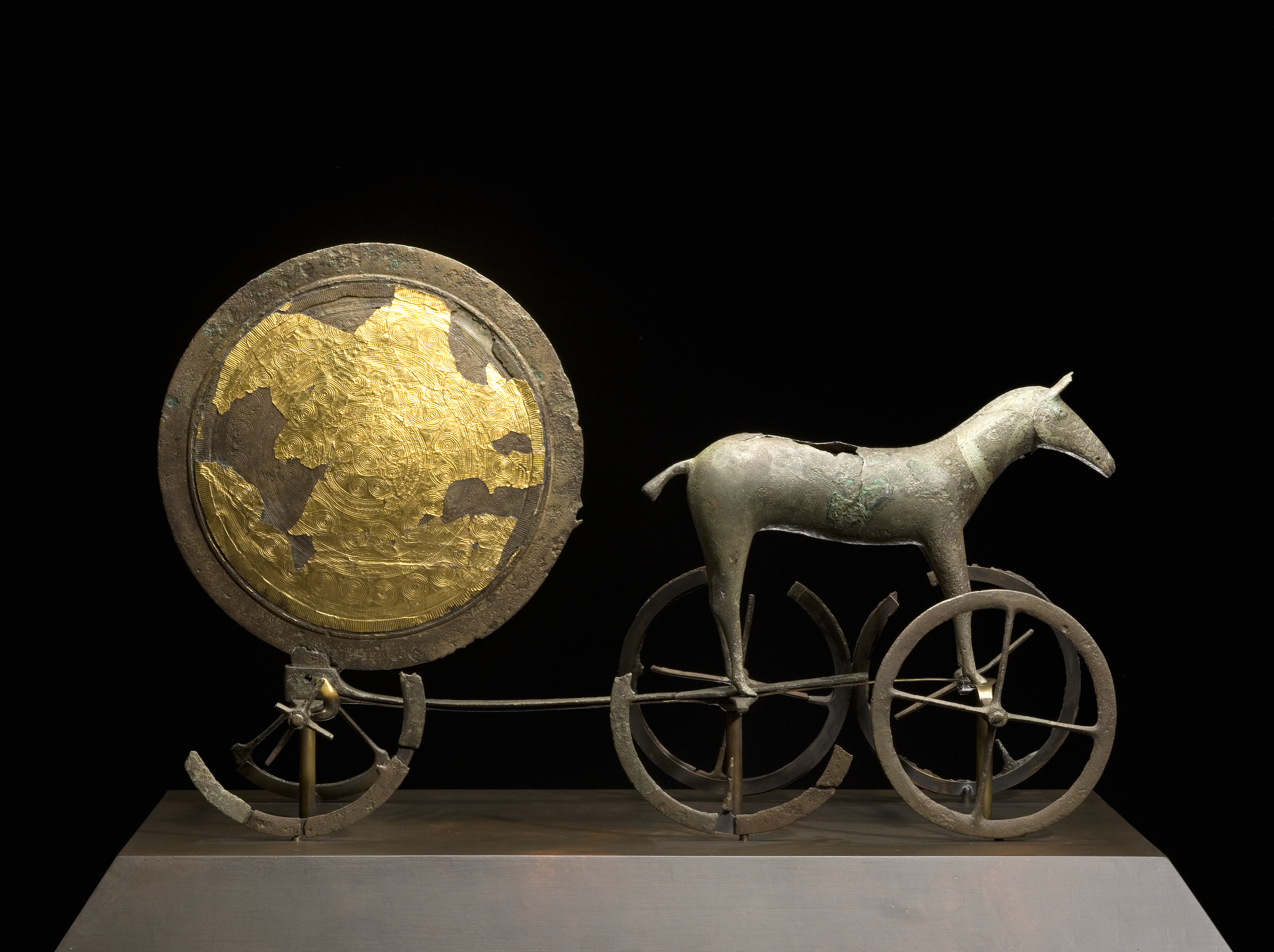
The Trundholm sun chariot

Chariots appear widely in the mythologies and religious traditions of many ancient cultures, often associated with solar deities, divine warriors, or royal symbolism. Chariots are an important part of both Hindu and Persian mythology, with most of the gods in their pantheon portrayed as riding them.

In the Rigveda, Indra is described as strong willed, armed with a thunderbolt, riding a chariot. Among Rigvedic deities, notably the Vedic Sun god Surya rides on a one spoked chariot driven by his charioteer Aruṇa. Ushas (the dawn) rides in a chariot, as well as Agni in his function as a messenger between gods and men.

The Jain Bhagavi Sutra states that Indian troops used a chariot with a club or mace attached to it during the war against the Licchavis during the reign of Ajatashatru of Magadha.

According to Greek mythology, the chariot was invented by Erichthonius of Athens to conceal his feet, which were those of a dragon. The most notable appearance of the chariot in Greek mythology occurs when Phaëton, the son of Helios, in an attempt to drive the chariot of the sun, managed to set the earth on fire. This story led to the archaic meaning of a phaeton as one who drives a chariot or coach, especially at a reckless or dangerous speed. Plato, in his Chariot Allegory, depicted a chariot drawn by two horses, one well behaved and the other troublesome, representing opposite impulses of human nature; the task of the charioteer, representing reason, was to stop the horses from going different ways and to guide them towards enlightenment.

The Trundholm sun chariot (Denmark, c. 1500-1300 BC) is a Nordic Bronze Age statue representing a sun chariot.

Chariots play an important role in Irish mythology surrounding the hero Cú Chulainn.

== See also ==
- Cavalry
- Chariot burial
- Chariot racing
- Chariot tactics
- South-pointing chariot

== Sources ==
- Anthony, David W. (2007), The Horse, The Wheel and Language: How Bronze-Age Riders from the Eurasian Steppes Shaped the Modern World, Princeton: Princeton University Press, ISBN 9780691058870
- Flood, Gavin D. (1996), An Introduction to Hinduism, Cambridge University Press
- Kuz'mina (2007), Mallory, J (ed.), The Origin of the Indo-Iranians, Brill, doi:10.1163/ej.9789004160545.i-763, ISBN 9789047420712
- Olson, Carl (2007), The Many Colors of Hinduism: A Thematic-historical Introduction, Rutgers University Press
- Raulwing, Peter (2000), Horses, Chariots and Indo-Europeans: Foundations and Methods of Chariotry Research from the Viewpoint of Comparative Indo-European Linguistics, Budapest: Archaeolingua, ISBN 9638046260
- Witzel, Michael (2001), "Autochthonous Aryans? The Evidence from Old Indian and Iranian Texts" (PDF), Electronic Journal of Vedic Studies, 7 (3): 1–115
