= Salatiwara =

City of Bronze Age Anatolia

Salatiwara was a Middle Bronze Age city in south-central Anatolia on a road connecting the kingdoms Waḫšušana and Burushattum. The history of the city is known primarily from the Anitta text.

In the 18th century BC, Salatiwara was besieged by Anitta, King of Kussara. Anitta defeated troops who were sent out from the city to confront him. The soldiers were taken to Nesa as prisoners. When the city revolted and marshaled its forces along the Hulana River, Anitta circled around and captured the city from behind, setting fire to the city in the process.

A large amount of silver and gold, as well as 40 teams of horses and 1400 infantry were removed from the city, either by the king of Salatiwara as he escaped, or by Anitta as booty.
