= Jan Paul Hinrichs =

Dutch academic (born 1956)

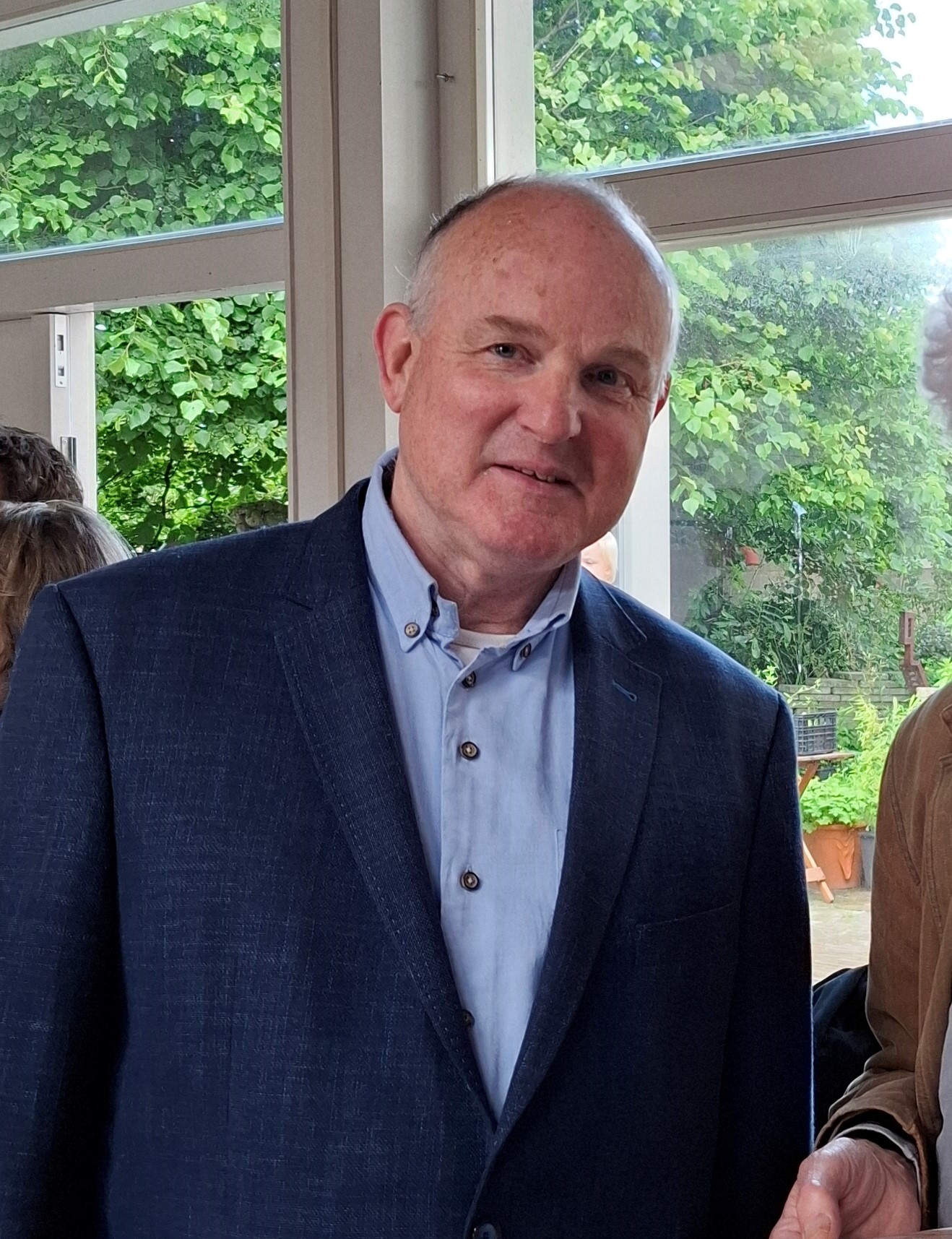
- Hinrichs in 2024
- Born: 1956 (age 69–70); The Hague, Netherlands
- Occupations: Writer, translator, Slavicist

Jan Paul Hinrichs (born 1956) is a Dutch writer, Slavicist, and translator. He studied Slavic languages and literature, with Italian as a minor, at Leiden University from 1975 to 1981 and Sofia University from 1979 to 1980. His grandfather was the artist and gallery owner Johan D. Scherft.

== Work ==
Jan Paul Hinrichs is the author of Father of Slavic Studies (2005), a biography of the Slavist Nicolaas van Wijk. He has written a series of literary essays devoted to the cities of Lviv (2008), Odesa (2017), Riga (2017), and Sofia (2019). In 2017 he published The Poetry of an Enclave, an essay on Oegstgeest, his place of residence at the time, as a theme in Dutch literature.

In his autobiographical essay Senior Valerio (2011; 2nd edition 2016), Hinrichs recounts his meeting in Moscow in 1978 with the Russian translator Yevgeny Vitkovski, who introduced him to the poet Valery Pereleshin, then living in Rio de Janeiro.

Books by Jan Paul Hinrichs have been translated into English, German, Italian, Russian, and Ukrainian.

He has written several articles on Dutch art history, including studies of the painter Jacob van Ruisdael. One of these articles was published in the art journal Oud Holland (2013/1). His book The Bremmerians (2024) focuses on the graphic artist Julie de Graag and other artists associated with her. This served as a prelude to the biography of Julie de Graag ,The Gouge as Companion, which was published in 2026.

=== Slavist ===
As a Slavist, Hinrichs has written books and articles on Bulgarian and Russian languages and literature, as well as on the history of Slavic studies and linguistics. His scholarly articles have appeared in various academic journals, including Language, International Journal of Slavic Poetics and Linguistics, Palaeobulgarica, Russian Studies: Ezhekvartalnik russkoi filologii i kul’tury and International Journal of Basque Linguistics and Philology.

=== Translator ===
Hinrichs has translated prose and poetry from Russian, Bulgarian, and Latvian. Among the Russian authors he has translated are Daniil Kharms, Vladislav Khodasevich, Valery Pereleshin, Ivan Bunin, Don Aminado and Mikhail Kuzmin. He has also translated works by Bulgarian authors, among others Atanas Dalchev and Nikolai Kantchev.

== Selected works ==
- Vader van de slavistiek. Leven en werk van Nicolaas van Wijk 1880–1941 [Father of Slavic Studies. Life and Work of Nicolaas van Wijk, 1880-1941] (Amsterdam, Bas Lubberhuizen, 2005).
- Lemberg–Lwów–Lviv (Amsterdam, Bas Lubberhuizen, 2008).
- De mythe van Odessa [The Myth of Odessa] (Amsterdam, Bas Lubberhuizen, 2011)
- Senhor Valério (Nijmegen: Flanor, 2011; 2nd edition: Amsterdam: De Wilde Tomaat 2016).
- Brief uit Vidin [Letter from Vidin] (Nijmegen: Flanor, 2015, 2nd edition: 2015).
- De poëzie van een enclave [The Poetry of an Enclave] (Amsterdam: De Wilde Tomaat, 2017, 2nd edition 2020).
- Trefpunt Riga [Meeting Point Riga] (Amsterdam: Bas Lubberhuizen, 2017).
- Sofia Express [Sofia Express] (Amsterdam: Bas Lubberhuizen, 2019).
- De laatste landheer [The Last Landlord] (Leiden: Fragment, 2020).
- Mysterie van voorbij. J. van Oudshoorn, werk en leven. Met schilderijen van Emo Verkerk [Mystery of the Past. J. van Oudshoorn, his Work and Life. With Paintings by Emo Verkerk] ('s-Gravenhage: Statenhofpers, 2024)
- Bremmerianen. Julie de Graag en haar kring: tien kunstenaressen in Den Haag en Laren [The Bremmerians. Julie de Graag and her Circle: Ten Female Artists in Laren and The Hague] (Leiden: Fragment, 2024)
- De guts als metgezel. Julie de Graag 1877-1924 [The Gouge as Companion. Julie de Graag 1877-1924] ('s-Gravenhage: Statenhofpers, 2026)

=== Slavistics ===
- Russian Poetry and Literary Life in Harbin and Shanghai, 1930–1950. The Memoirs of Valerij Perelešin. Edited by Jan Paul Hinrichs (Amsterdam: Rodopi, 1987).
- Валерий Перелешин, Русский поэт в гостях у Китая: 1920–1952. Сб. стихотворений. Edited by Jan Paul Hinrichs (The Hague: Leuxenhoff Publishing, 1989).
- Verbannte Muse. Zehn Essays über russische Lyriker der Emigration (München: Sagner, 1992).
- Valerij Perelešin (1913–1992). Catalogue of his Papers and Books in Leiden University Library (Leiden: Leiden University Library, 1997).
- In Search of Another St Petersburg: Venice in Russian Poetry (1823–1997) (München: Sagner, 1997).
- The C.H. van Schooneveld Collection in Leiden University Library. Editorial Correspondence and Documents Relating to Mouton & Co., The Hague, and Other Papers in the Fields of Slavistics and Linguistics (Leiden: Leiden University Library, 2001).
- Nicolaas van Wijk (1880–1941): Slavist, Linguist, Philanthropist (Amsterdam: Rodopi, 2006).
- C.C. Uhlenbeck (1866–1951): A Linguist Revisited (with Inge Genee). Special issue of: Canadian Journal of Netherlandic Studies 29/2–30/1 (Fall 2008 / Spring 2009).

=== Translations ===
- Nikolaj Kuntsjev, Mijn gegrom beschermt het paradijs [My Growl Safeguards the Paradise] (Leiden: Plantage, 1991).
- Atanas Daltsjev, Ontvolkte plaatsen [Deserted places] (Oegstgeest: De Lantaarn, 2007)
- Don-Aminado, Aforismen [Aphorisms] (Amsterdam: De Wilde Tomaat, 2018).
- Europese nacht. Negen Russische dichters [European Night. Nine Russian Poets] (Flanor, 2019 [=4th edition; first edition 1983] (Nijmegen: Flanor, 2019).
- Ivan Boenin, Nacht, nieuwe maan, mistral [Night, Moon, Mistral] (‘s-Gravenhage: Statenhofpers, 2020).
- Ivan Boenin, Over Tsjechov [On Chekhov] (‘s-Gravenhage: Statenhofpers, 2020).
- Michail Koezmin, Alexandrijnse gezangen [Alexandrian Songs] (‘s-Gravenhage: Statenhofpers, 2021).
- Michail Koezmin, Dagboek 1934 [Diary, 1934] (‘s-Gravenhage: Statenhofpers, 2022).
- Requiem voor een boerderij. Zes Letse gedichten [Requiem for a Farmhouse. Six Latvian Poems] (Woubrugge: Avalon Pers, 2023).
- Een vreemdelinge op de drempel. Negen Bulgaarse dichters [A Stranger at the Threshold. NIne Bulgarian Poets] (Nijmegen: Flanor, 2025).
- Daniil Charms, 50 verhalen [50 Stories] (‘s-Gravenhage: Statenhofpers, 2025).
