= Nicolaas van Wijk =

Dutch linguist (1880–1941)

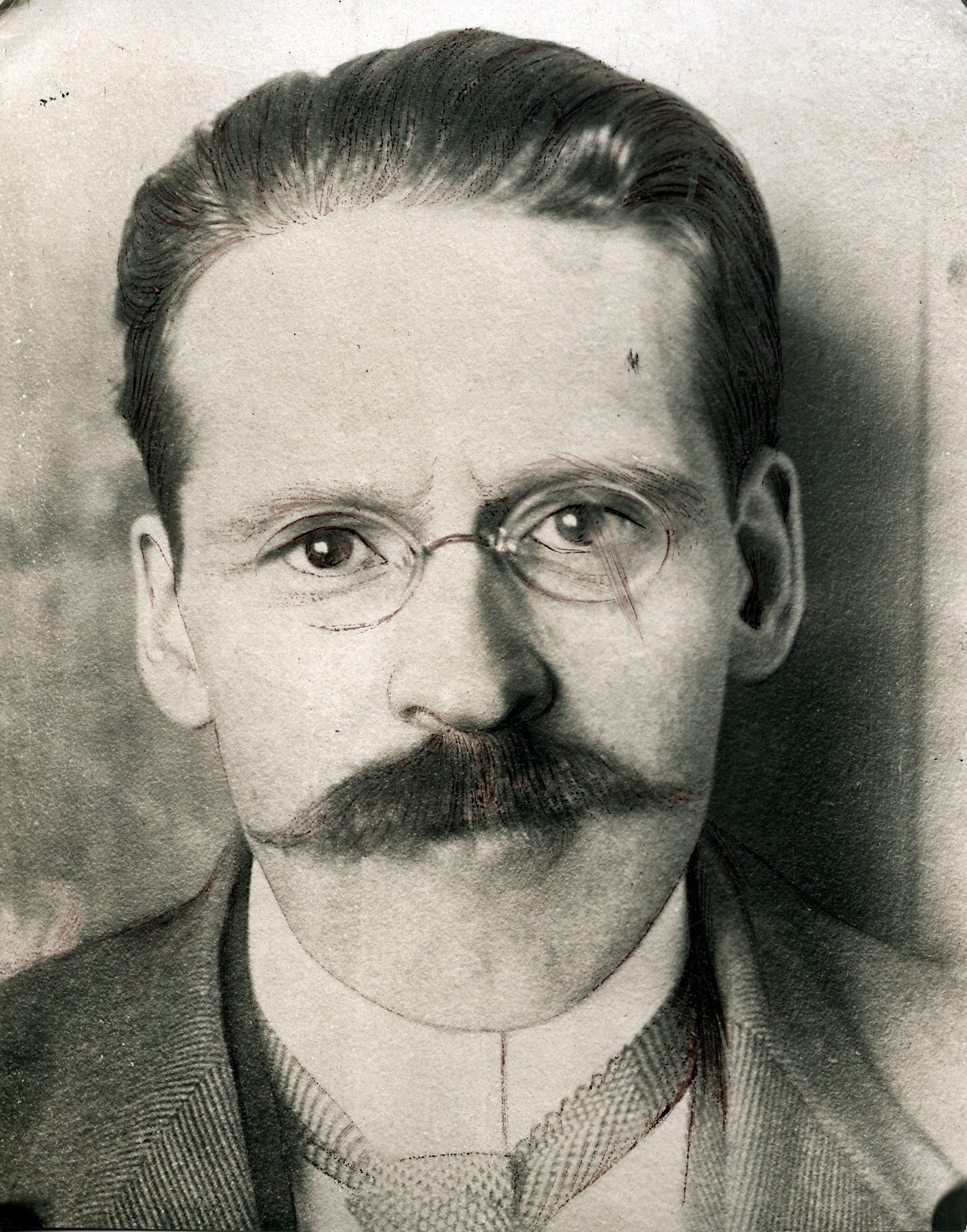
- Van Wijk in 1913
- Born: 4 October 1880; Delden, Netherlands
- Died: 25 March 1941 (aged 60); Leiden, Netherlands
- Burial place: Rhijnhof cemetery
- Occupation: Professor
- Known for: First chair of Balto-Slavic languages at Leiden University; Van Wijk's law

Academic background
- Education: University of Amsterdam
- Thesis: Der nominale Genetiv Singular im Indogermanischen in seinem Verhältnis zum Nominativ (1902)
- Doctoral advisor: R. C. Boer

Academic work
- Discipline: Linguistics
- Sub-discipline: Historical linguistics; comparative linguistics; Indo-European studies; Slavic studies; Dutch language; Russian literature
- Doctoral students: Jan Romein; Bernd von Arnim; P. C. Paardekooper; Wils Huisman
- Notable students: Annie Romein-Verschoor; F. B. J. Kuiper; Klaas Hanzen Heeroma

Nicolaas van Wijk (Note: In some contexts, Van Wijk's first name is spelled as Nikolaas. He is said to have preferred this spelling, but his birth certificate contains the c spelling.) (Note: In some Russian contexts, he is referred to as Nikolay Vasilyevich van Veyk (Николай Васильевич ван Вейк). The name "Nikolaj" was also used by some of his students. In some Polish contexts, he is referred to as Mikołaj van Wijk.) (Dutch pronunciation: [ˈnikoːlaːs fɑɱ ˈʋɛik]; 4 October 1880 – 25 March 1941) was a Dutch linguist, literary scholar, and philanthropist. He is best known for his contributions to Slavistics, serving as the first chair of the Balto-Slavic languages at Leiden University from 1913 until his death in 1941.

Born to a family of Dutch Reformed preachers, Van Wijk began his academic life studying Dutch literature before becoming involved in comparative and historical linguistics. After receiving his doctorate from the University of Amsterdam, he secured a grant to work at Leipzig University and traveled to Russia to study the language there, where he became enthralled by Russian literature. He was then hired as a curator and deputy librarian at the Royal Library of the Netherlands before being hired as a professor at Leiden University. His publications led to him being selected for the newly-created chair of Balto-Slavic languages, which was controversial as many prominent scholars in Russia disapproved. Following his appointment, he began a trip across Eastern Europe in order to acquire books in his fields for the university's library and establish contacts in academia there.

Beginning shortly after the outbreak of World War I until his death during World War II, Van Wijk was a noted philanthropist. He had allowed several people from Eastern Europe to stay with him in the Netherlands as they escaped war and persecution, including Polish Jews and Russian dissidents of communism. In 1915, he traveled to Poland to oversee the application of aid provided from the Netherlands. His contacts with Eastern Europeans led to his being suspected by the Dutch government of being a communist, though in reality Van Wijk was a harsh critic of communism. Following his death, his personal library, which comprised around 7,000 books, was donated to the Leiden University Library.

== Early life and education ==
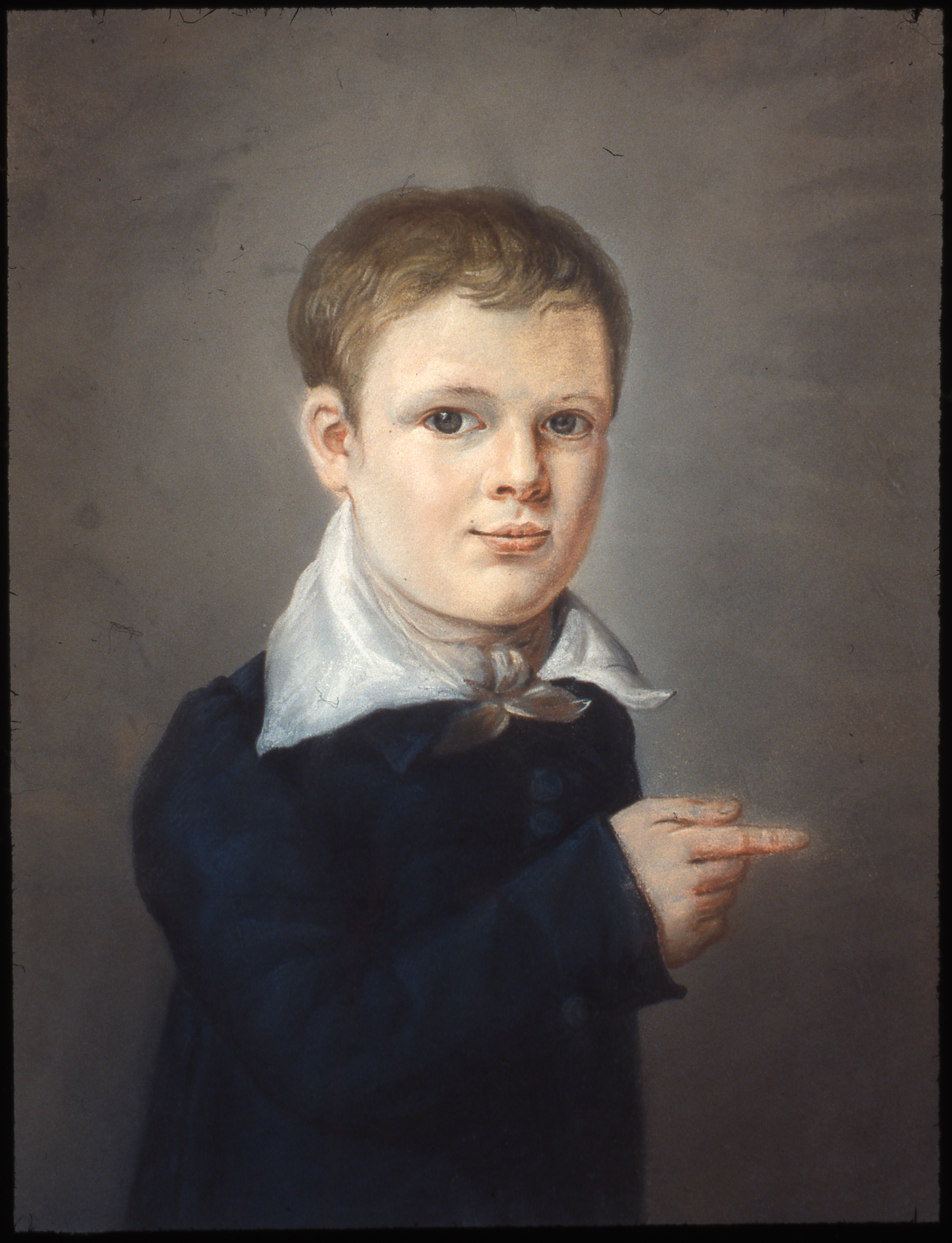
A portrait of Van Wijk as a child

Nicolaas van Wijk was born on 4 October 1880 in Delden, the only son of Aart Willem van Wijk, a liberal minister in the Dutch Reformed Church from Weesp, and Bregitta (née Bruin), (Note: Bregitta's last name is sometimes spelled Bruijn.) the daughter of Weesp's burgemeester. The youngest of five, Aart and both of his brothers – Pieter and Nico – were all Reformed ministers, as was their father for whom Nicolaas was named. On 30 October, Nicolaas was baptized.

The family moved to Zwolle in 1886 following Aart's assignment as the new minister; Nicolaas shortly thereafter attended the local nutsschool. Following a successful entrance exam, he began schooling at the Zwolle Gymnasium in 1892. During his time at the gymnasium, Van Wijk studied Dutch and geography under the tutelage of Foeke Buitenrust Hettema, a Frisian linguist who taught Dutch from a descriptivist and scientific lens and was a key figure in the modernizing linguistic education. Known for his "unbridled energy and pig-headedness" in teaching this way – for which he was reprimanded by the scholastic board – he remained an important influence, correspondent, and confidant after Van Wijk's graduation. Van Wijk and his classmate Leo Polak became good friends and intellectual rivals. Van Wijk was a model student with exceptionally high marks in Dutch history, Latin, Ancient Greek, and Hebrew, although he struggled in High German. He struggled similarly in mathematics, but by the end of his schooling he had earned the highest score during the graduating exams. After completing gymnasium in 1898, Van Wijk began studying Dutch literature at the University of Amsterdam.

On 3 October, Van Wijk moved to Kloveniersburgwal and began studying under H. C. Rogge, C. M. Kan, and Jan te Winkel in history, geography, and Netherlandistics, respectively. Kan was particularly impressed with Van Wijk's work, writing that he had "given ample proof of serious study, insight and the gift of expressing himself clearly and succinctly." Van Wijk had made an impression with another professor, C. C. Uhlenbeck, then employed by the university as a buitengewoon hoogleraar though the following year he was promoted to a full professorship. Van Wijk recounted during his inaugural lecture in 1913: "From the first day that I heard a Wulfila lecture I have worked under your influence." He met Van Wijk regularly on Saturday afternoons to teach him Sanskrit. Following Uhlenbeck's departure from the university, his professorship was filled by his colleague R. C. Boer. During this period, Van Wijk kept a remarkably low profile; it is likely that he was an attendee of the Jacob van Maelant Association, a student's association for Dutch literature, but – outside of one essay lecture he gave on Völuspá, a poem in the Poetic Edda, in 1900 which ended in a debate with David Wijnkoop – he does not appear to have had any appreciable role in the association. It is possible that he assisted in inviting guest speakers for the Literarische Studenten-Vereeniging ('Literary Students Union'), a student organization for classicists and Netherlandicists.

After passing his doctoraal exam – granting him the equivalent of a master's degree – in May 1901, Van Wijk returned to Zwolle on 7 October to begin writing his doctoral dissertation. Around this time, Van Wijk began taking steps to choose comparative linguistics as his topic of study. On 24 November, he sent a letter to Wilhelm Streitberg, editor of the academic journal Indogermanische Forschungen ('Indo-European Research'), requesting his article be published; he wrote that Uhlenbeck had urged him to send the article for publication after reviewing it himself. It is unknown what Streitberg's reply was, but the article – entitled Über die ursprüngliche Stammgestalt der idg. sogenannten i- und u-Stämme ('On the Original Stem Form of the So-Called IE *i- and *u-Stems') – was not published.

In 1902, after receiving a grant from the Amsterdamse Universiteitsvereniging ('University of Amsterdam Association'), Van Wijk completed his doctoral dissertation, Der nominale Genitiv Singular im Indogermanischen in seinem Verhältnis zum Nominativ ('The Nominal Genitive Singular in Indo-European in its Relationship to the Nominative'). Van Wijk argued that certain nominative and genitive singular forms, such as in Latin ops and opis, arose from a common origin. Although it was initially met with skepticism, the paper was considered bold and received renewed interest several decades later. Van Wijk, however, later distanced himself from the dissertation, writing ten years later: "I asserted a great deal in my own dissertation which, on further reflection, appears to me all too fantastical and which I have increasingly come to regret". Still, the dissertation had its supporters; Jacobus van Ginneken, another of Uhlenbeck's doctoral students, wrote about Uhlenbeck's reaction to it thus:

Shortly after my arrival in Leiden in 1902 I heard Uhlenbeck say about Van Wijk: 'now, that really was an Indo-Europeanist.['] [...] Just imagine, this Mr. Van Wijk dared to prove, just like that, that the Indo-European nominative and genitive cases originally differed in nothing more than accent. Karl Brugmann in Leipzig may well be horrified, but he made a very good case and may well be right.

The thesis was thereafter published in book form in two editions by the Zwolle-based publisher J. J. Tijl. The book form was dedicated to Van Wijk's parents.

== Early career ==
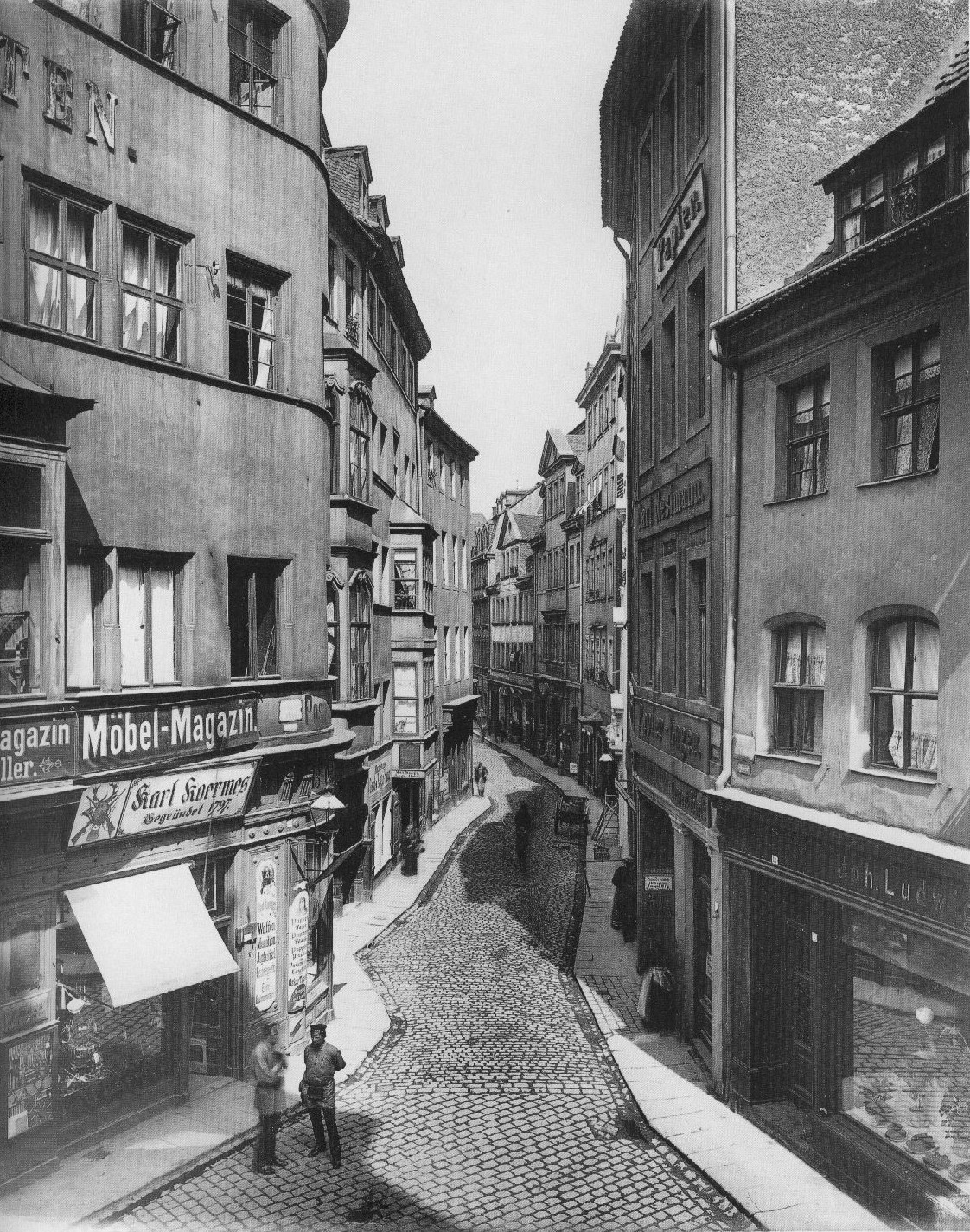
Van Wijk moved to Leipzig in 1902, pictured here the same year.

Following his doctorate, Van Wijk attended Leipzig University, which had become a center for Indo-European studies and historical and comparative linguistics around this time under Karl Brugmann. On 24 September, he received word that he would receive a grant from the Amsterdamse Universiteitsvereniging; the grant, secured by Boer and Uhlenbeck, authorized him sixty guilders (ƒ) per month for up to ten months. At the time, the Netherlands had compulsory military service, but he shortly received an exemption from service; on 9 October, he received a letter from the provincial Queen's Commissioner informing him that he was "irrevocably exempted from service" on the grounds that he was his parents' "only legal son". Van Wijk registered his departure from Zwolle on 15 October and registered at Leipzig University ten days later. At the time, Van Wijk considered Karl Brugmann and Brugmann's pupil Hermann Hirt to be "representatives of the two mainstreams of thought" in historical linguistics and wrote that he considered himself more sympathetic to Hirt than Brugmann. While at Leipzig, Van Wijk attended the lectures and Übungen of three specialists: Brugmann, whose work focused on the Greek and Italic languages; Ernst Windisch, on Sanskrit; and August Leskien, on the Slavic languages. He was notably taken with Leskien and found his courses to be the most interesting and impressively condensed; Leskien had covered the grammars of Proto-Slavic, Bulgarian, Serbian, Russian, and Ukrainian comprehensively – and Polish partially – in a single semester. He later recounted that:

Leskien's lectures and 'Übungen' were especially interesting, in fact more interesting than anything else I heard in Leipzig, not only for their content but, also for the clear manner in which everything was set out, for the vigor of the presentation, which made one listen to everything with interest and ensured that once heard it was not quickly forgotten. [...] I attribute to these lectures above all the fact that my studies tended more and more in the direction of the Slavic languages. I have to thank Leskien for the insight into the great value of this subject for the [Indo-Europeanist] [...]

Although Hirt advised Van Wijk not take his classes as they were aimed at novices to the field, the two commonly discussed their work at Hirt's home.

In 1903, Van Wijk left Leipzig for Moscow. He had opportunities to go to Budapest, Helsinki, and Lithuania, but chose Moscow in part because Uhlenbeck had spoken to him enthusiastically about Russia. Van Wijk considered it crucial to speak a language that was different than his mother tongue, a conviction that predated – but was encouraged by – his companionship with Hirt. He wrote that he had chosen Russian for three reasons. First, he considered it the most difficult and believed this would help him learn other Slavic languages more quickly. Second, he believed that Russian's preservation of Proto-Slavic accent would be useful in further study. Third, Russia in general – and Moscow in particular – gave him the best opportunity to make connections with other academics in the field and give him the opportunity to learn the language with the prestige dialect, rather than learning Russian in the Empire's peripheral territories.

Although Van Wijk attempted to learn Russian before his departure, once in Russia he found it difficult to converse with Russians and understand the lectures. He boarded with two Russian families, one in Moscow and another in the countryside nearby, for about six months and became fluent in Russian, writing later in his report: "I have managed to learn the language in such a way that when I speak or read Russian, I feel the spoken and written just like a Russian does." Van Wijk wrote that he considered the trip successful and that he gained a new subject of study: Russian literature. Following his return to the Netherlands in August, he attempted – and failed – to secure a privaat-docentschap. In November, Van Wijk moved to Arnhem and began teaching at the Hogere Burgerschool there, though he left less than two months later. Sometime in early January 1904, Van Wijk departed for Goes to take another teaching job at the state-run school there. Despite the relative isolation there, he remained in touch with academics; he reported his academic journey to the board of the Amsterdamse Universiteitsvereniging and J. C. Matthes and H. W. Bakhuis Roozeboom used the report to advocate that a chair should be created for Russian.

While living in Goes, Van Wijk began publishing work in several academic journals, including Indogermanische Forschungen, Tijdschrift voor Nederlandse Taal- en Letterkunde ('Journal of Dutch Linguistics and Literature'), and Taal en Letteren ('Language and Literature'). He published several papers on Dutch and at least one each on Greek syntax, the verbum substantivum, and the Indo-European ablaut. He also published a noteworthy paper comparing Old High German first-person plural verb declensions to their Slavic counterparts in Serbian and Slovene.

Writing a grammar is a difficult and rather dangerous work: however one does it, one will always stand exposed to the criticism of many. [...] All too often one finds rules and divisions that may well be valid for Latin or for German or for the Dutch language of a previous era, but not for Dutch as currently spoken; and all too often it is the unjustifiably self-assured voice of the lecturing author that speaks out of various school grammars, concerned above all to convince his pupils that this and only this is the absolute truth.

— Nicolaas van Wijk, in a review of Antoine Meillet and André Vaillant's Grammaire de la langue serbo-croate ('A Grammar of the Serbo-Croatian Language')

On 4 June 1905, Johan Tjeenk Willink – a former schoolmate of Van Wijk's at gymnasium – wrote to inquire about the latter writing a Dutch grammar textbook for young students. Tjeenk Willink offered to pay ƒ35 per quire of 16 pages, estimating the number of quires to be between ten and twelve. Van Wijk had requested to use the new orthography advocated by their old teacher Buitenrust Hettema, but Tjeenk Willink intended to sell the books to schools, who had not received any official approval from the minister of the interior, and so denied the request. Still, Van Wijk assented and requested for Buitenrust Hettema to review his copy. He finished the book early and half-a-quire oversized, but Tjeenk Willink accepted the book and paid Van Wijk accordingly. The book – De Nederlandsche taal ('The Dutch Language') – was successful and saw six editions, though despite this success it was ultimately recommended for older students than its intended audience. The book received positive acclaim for its clarity and accuracy and found use at universities.

On 26 November 1906, Van Wijk was appointed by royal decree to be deputy librarian at the Royal Library of the Netherlands in The Hague following the departure of T. J. de Boer, effective 1 February. He moved to The Hague on 26 January and began working under W. G. C. Byvanck, who was controversial for his unorthodox teaching style and abrasive personality, but he and Van Wijk enjoyed a warm affection for each other. Byvank began reorganizing the library, raising its budget, adding several codices of illuminated manuscripts to the library's catalog, and creating a museum to make some of the library's holdings available for public viewing. He placed Van Wijk in charge as curator of manuscripts, where he worked largely on Middle Dutch and documents from the Boer War.

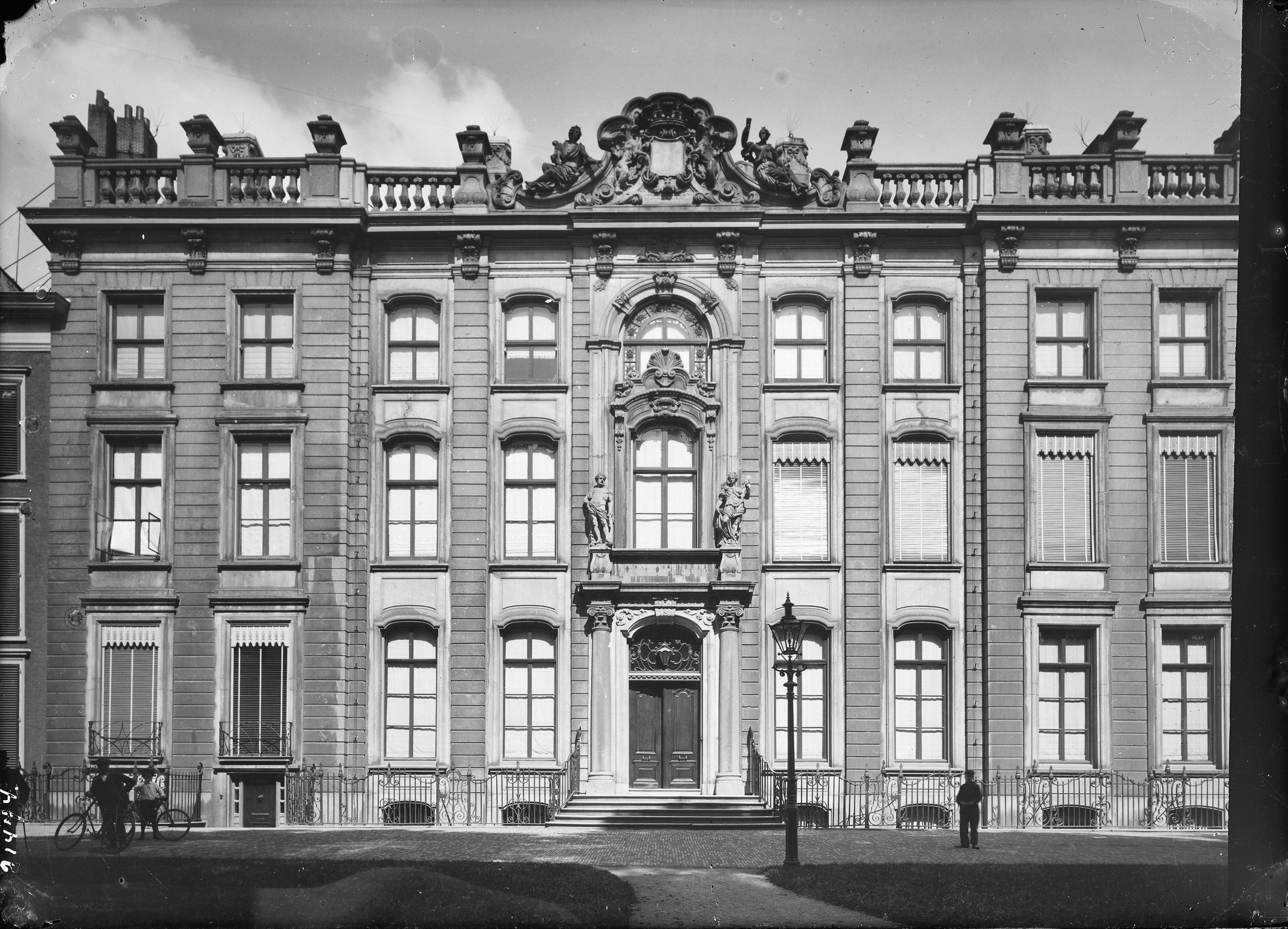
During Van Wijk's employment, the Royal Library of the Netherlands was housed at the Huis Huguetan on the Lange Voorhout, pictured here in 1900.

Roughly six months after his appointment to the Royal Library, he was granted a month-long leave of absence to travel to Russia by Ministry of Internal Affairs with the support of Byvanck. While there, he traveled around Russia, staying mostly in and around Moscow with a several-day trip to the then-capital Saint Petersburg. Following his return, he wrote a report published in De Gids – Russische indrukken ('Russian Impressions'), his first major piece of travel literature – in which he contrasted the trip with his first some four years earlier; according to Van Wijk, support for the tsar had eroded to the point of non-existence, censorship was on the decline, and Russian literature had experienced a rapid influx of Marxist and socialist topics. During his trip, he met Sophia Tolstaya, Leo Tolstoy's wife, which left him with the impression that Tolstoy was unappreciated by his family. He wrote of the encounter:

A brief meeting with the Countess Tolstoy immediately convinced me that the allegation is true. If I had not known who this woman was, I would certainly have been struck by her refinement, her knowledge, by that simplicity of natural distinction in which the Russian aristocracy are inferior to no-one in the world. But now that I had to try to imagine this woman of the world at the side of Leo Tolstoy, my first and only thought was: Unhappy land, where the greatest men they have are understood and valued thus.

Little is known about the rest of Van Wijk's time in The Hague, but he published regularly in academic journals and began to investigate Dutch dialects to determine their origins. Van Wijk's publications around this time demonstrate an intense interest in sound laws which mirrored work earlier in his career, which flowed from Indo-European linguistics to Dutch historical dialectology, the latter of which was at the time virtually unstudied. He published his frustration in the academic journal De Nieuwe Taalgids ('The New Language Guides'), writing: "Is it not then shameful that we still know so little of the history and mutual relations of our dialects?" Van Wijk wrote several works on the dialectology of Dutch and Middle Dutch, though none of his work from this time was fieldwork. At the recommendation of Jacob Verdam, the publishing house Martinus Nijhoff requested Van Wijk to publish an update for Johannes Franck's 1892 Etymologisch woordenboek der Nederlandsche taal ('Etymological Dictionary of the Dutch Language'). After six thousand hours of work, the new version was published in several installments between 1910 and 1912. Although Van Wijk's update bears little resemblance to Franck's work, he retained Franck's name as a sign of respect and thanked him specifically in the foreword for making his notebook available. The work was seminal; several significant papers on the phonology of regional Dutch dialects used Van Wijk's dictionary extensively and led to the discovery that sound changes in Polish demonstrated by Henryk Ułaszyn had parallel developments in Dutch. Van Wijk was paid ƒ750 for the book, roughly a third of his salary at the time. Nijhoff attempted to pay Franck the remaining ƒ245, but he refused it and gave it to Van Wijk instead.

In 1912, Van Wijk was again granted leave by the Ministry of Internal Affairs and departed for his third trip to Russia. Although he did not write a report about his travels as he did for the prior two trips, the trip appears to have tilted his interest from etymology to Slavistics. Van Wijk published several papers on Russian literature and his time in Russia – including in De Gids and Onze Eeuw ('Our Century') – and his reports about the situation in Russia set him apart, as few were publishing about the topic in the Netherlands at the time. While his previous linguistic and etymological work had been terse, his works on Russia were notably long and flowery. Van Wijk's editors for these publications often criticized his writing style, but his expertise was unique, he made no factual errors, and he was able to maintain a regular reading audience.

== Appointment as chair ==
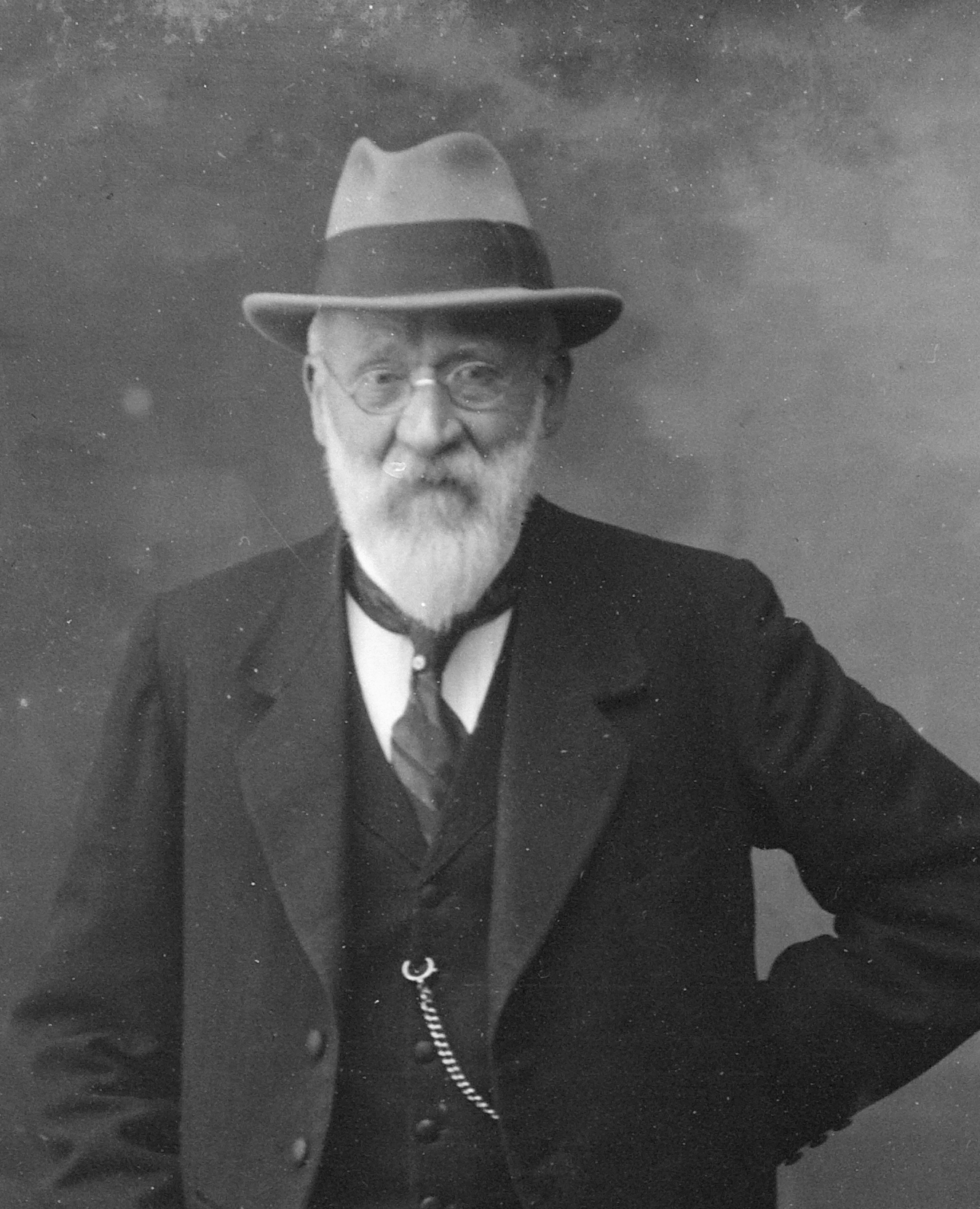
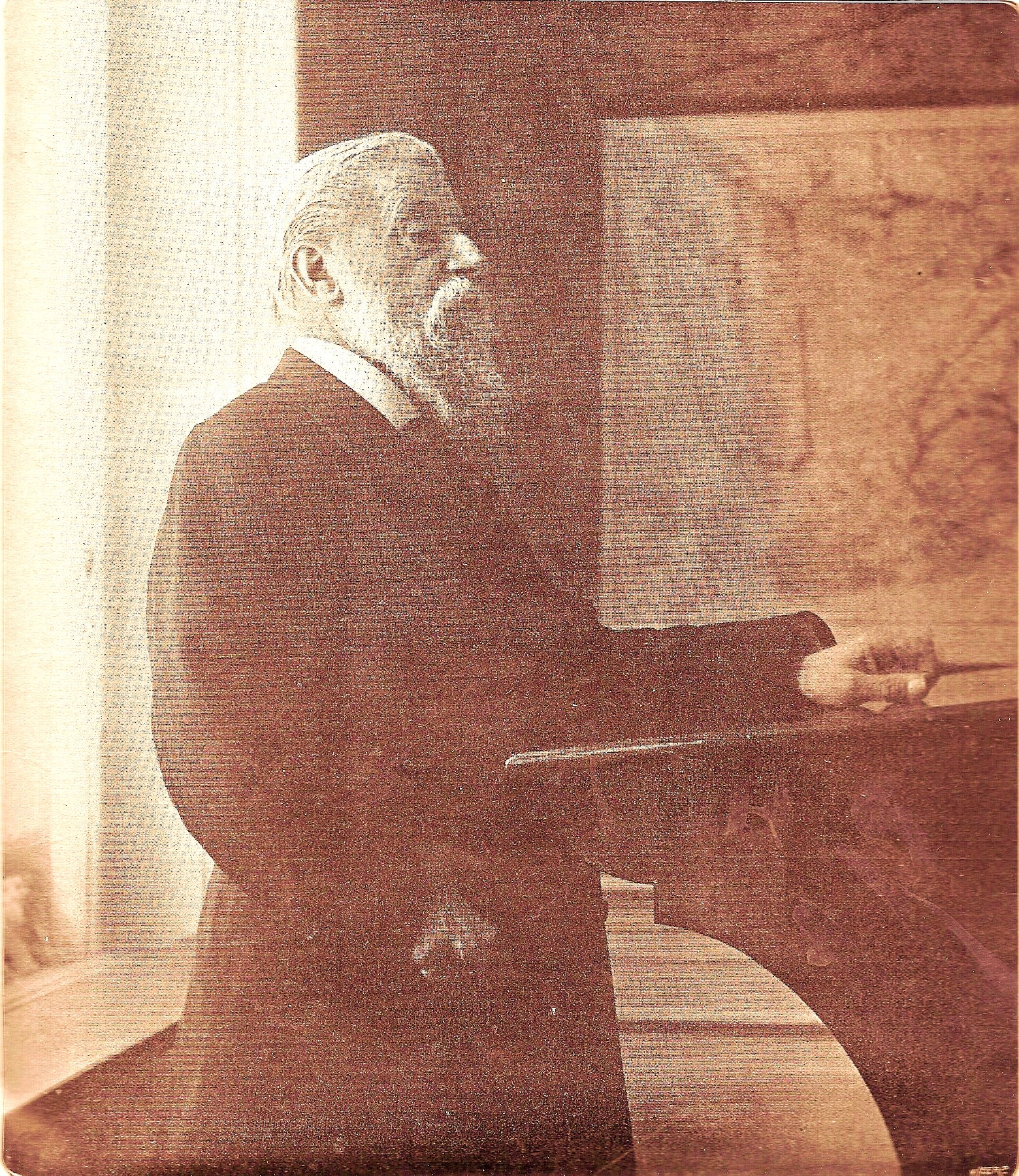
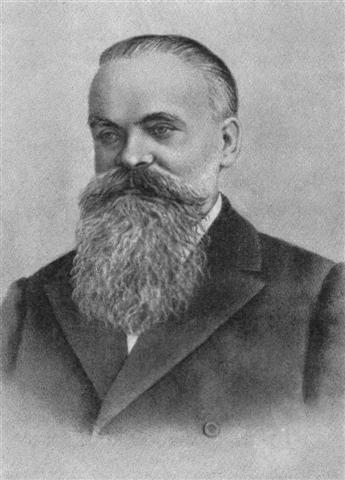
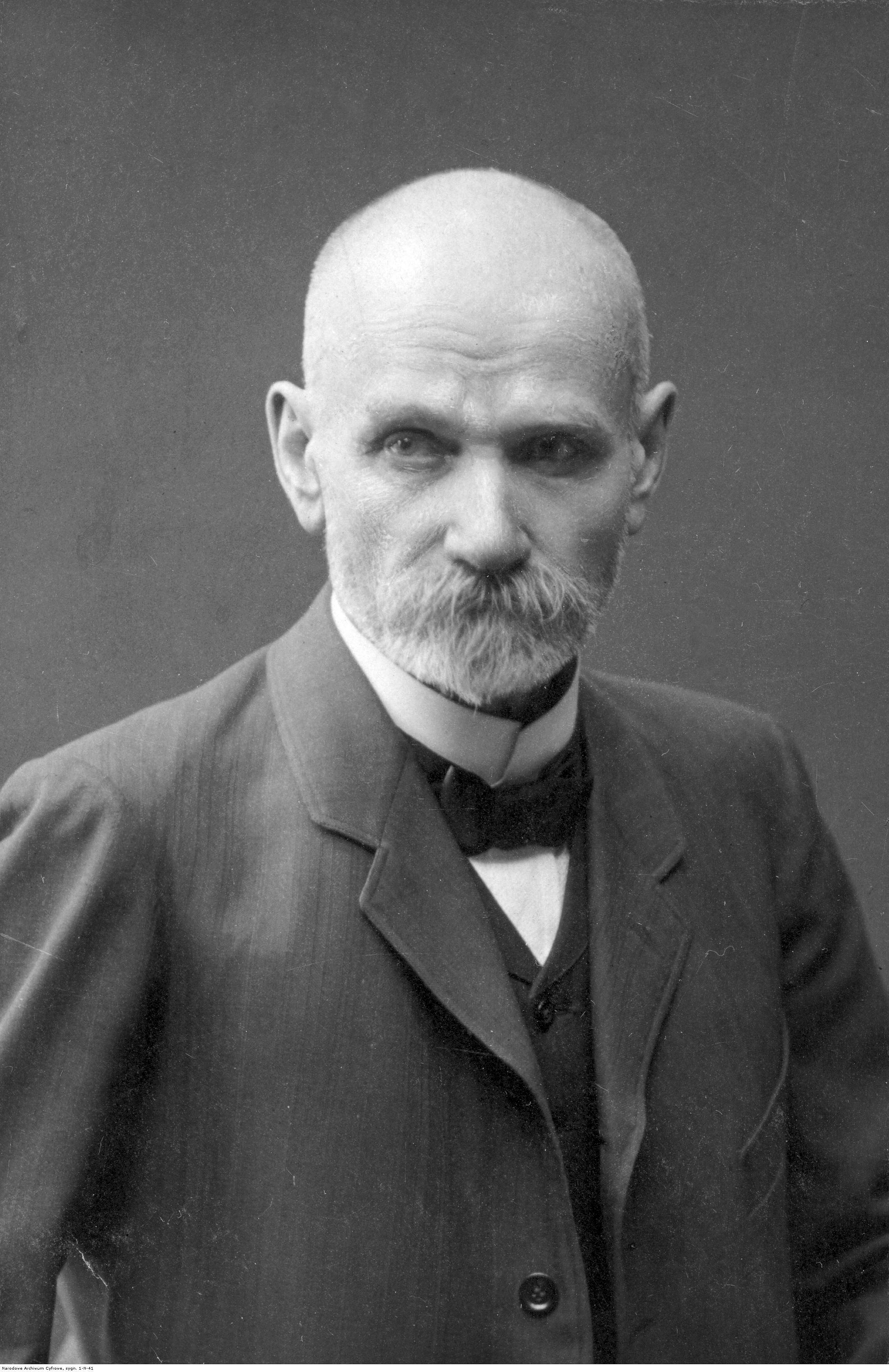
C. C. Uhlenbeck (top left) and Jacob Verdam (top right) supported Van Wijk for the chair while Filipp Fortunatov (bottom left) and Jan Baudouin de Courtenay were part of the effort to halt his appointment.

In 1913, Van Wijk was appointed the first chair of the Baltic and Slavic languages at Leiden University. The move was preceded by a long fight by several scholars – including Uhlenbeck, J. J. Hartman, Anna Catharina Croiset van der Kop, and Reinder van der Meulen – to get a chair in either Russian or the Slavic languages at Leiden University. Croiset van der Kop in particular appears to have had significant influence in the development of the chair. In 1911, Abraham Kuyper publicly supported Croiset van der Kop as the obvious choice for the chairmanship in De Standaard, citing that she came "emphatically recommended [...] by Russian scholars" and later urged the Second Chamber of the Dutch parliament to create the chair. Theo Heemskerk – then Prime Minister of the Netherlands – approved the creation of the chair, but postponed the official approval until a better candidate could be found. On 23 January 1912, Uhlenbeck and Verdam recommended either Van Wijk or Van der Meulen to the chairmanship to the Leiden University faculty. Six days later, a letter was issued by the faculty to the government recommending Van Wijk to the position as their primary choice over Van der Meulen, as "his studies do not have the universal character that so favorably distinguishes the work of Dr. van Wijk".

Croiset van der Kop was supported by myriad Slavists and linguists for the position – including a letter from Saint Petersburg which included ten prominent Slavists from the school such as Jan Baudouin de Courtenay, Ivan Bychkov, Aleksey Shakhmatov, Alexey Sobolevskij, and Filipp Fortunatov – but her supporters had coalesced around her too late in the process; the letters of support only arrived after the faculty had issued their recommendations. When the government had received a massive volley of support for Croiset van der Kop, the Leiden faculty stood behind their recommendation for Van Wijk. Verdam and J. C. G. Jonker, with the help of Uhlenbeck, responded to a following government inquiry into why they should not also include Croiset van der Kop by arguing that, while her publications and research in Russian and Polish were numerous and sound, the scope of her research was too small for the chair, which was to encompass the whole of the Balto-Slavic languages. This response forced Heemskerk to accept Van Wijk as the official appointee and pass the appointment on to approval by royal decree. The decree was issued 25 July 1913, though the government of Leiden did not inform him officially until 9 August. He was officially sworn in at 1:30 pm on 8 October 1913 and immediately thereafter gave an inaugural lecture, Balties-Slaviese problemen ('Balto-Slavic problems'), in which he expounded the importance of the Balto-Slavic languages to Indo-European comparative linguistics, gave thanks to several of his teachers and colleagues, and professed support for his students. At his recommendation, the position was renamed to chair of the Balto-Slavic languages.

Dissent for Van Wijk's appointment remained a present force. Critics such as Anthony Brummelkamp, Alexander Brückner, and K. E. W. Strootman published critical articles in newspapers and journals about Van Wijk, writing that his appointment was the result of a conspiracy against Croiset van der Kop and pointed to the possibility of anti-feminist forces at work. The Croatian Slavicist Vatroslav Jagić wrote to Van Wijk that the attacks on his appointment were not personal nor a criticism of Van Wijk's academic strength, but Slavists were frustrated he had been appointed because he was a comparative linguist with few publications known in Russia, not a well-known Slavic philologist like the Slavists believed the Netherlands was in need of. Van Wijk responded arguing that the chair was not intended for philologists, but rather students interested in comparative linguistics as specialization of their Dutch literature and linguistics studies. Still, Van Wijk expressed an interest in appealing to the philologists, writing to Jagić: "Students have also expressed the wish that I would pass on my knowledge of Russian literature and culture to my pupils, and I intend to meet this wish after the Christmas holidays and also give a lecture on literature if I can find an audience for it in the narrow circle of philologists." Despite this, disapproval at Van Wijk's appointment was far from universal. Antoine Meillet wrote glowing support in the Bulletin de la Société de Linguistique de Paris, remarking that "the breadth of his curiosity and the extent of his knowledge give to his inaugural lecture a very particular character: it is not commonplace to see the phonetics of Polish clarified by parallel facts offered by Dutch dialects, or to see some large groups of facts of Slavic phonetics traced back to a single principle [...]". Following Van Wijk's appointment, Croiset van der Kop returned to the Netherlands, changing her will and testament to reflect her disappointment; her personal library and part of her estate were to be donated to the Leiden Library, but the change directed this bequeathal be given to Russian institutions instead.

== Tour of Eastern Europe ==
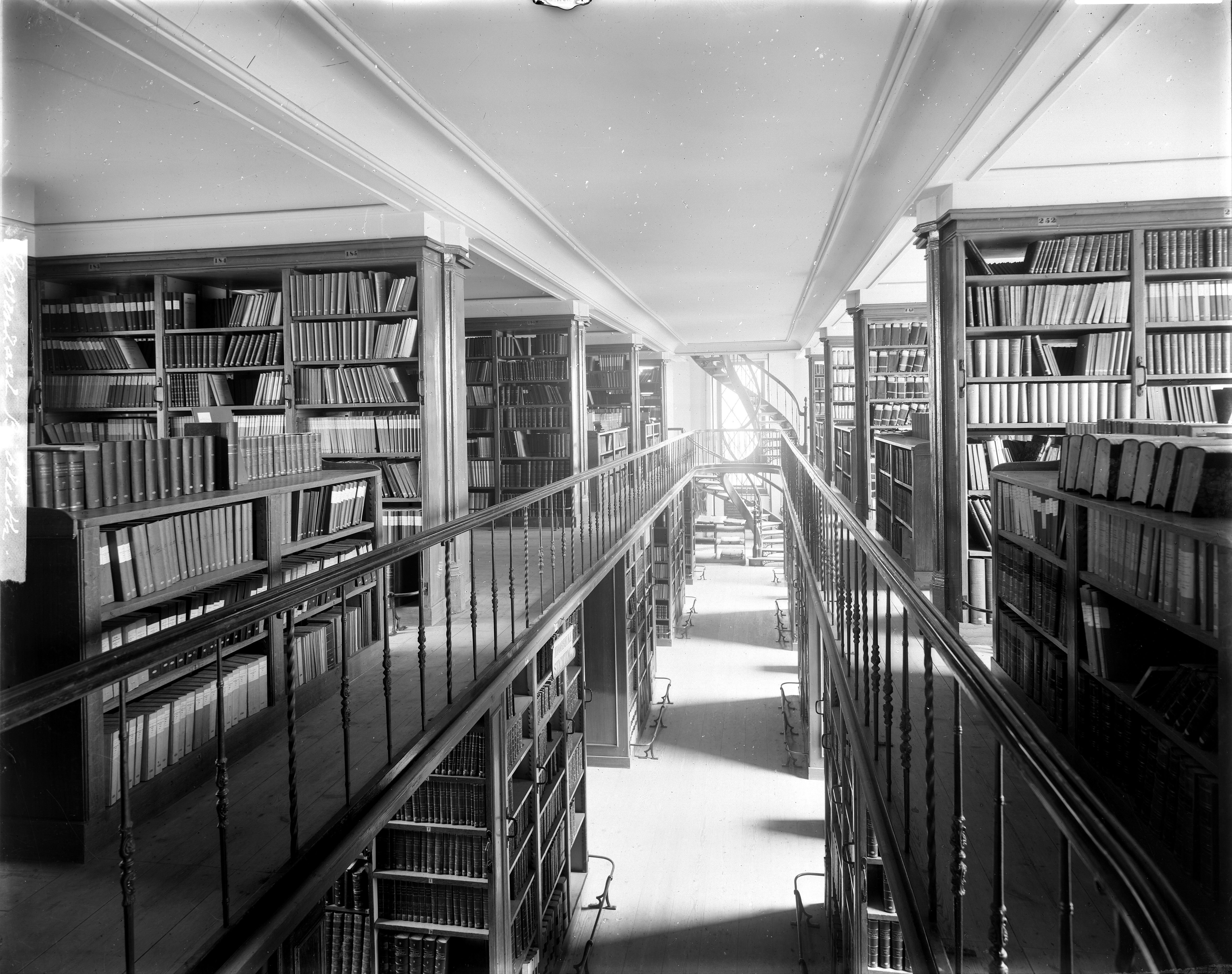
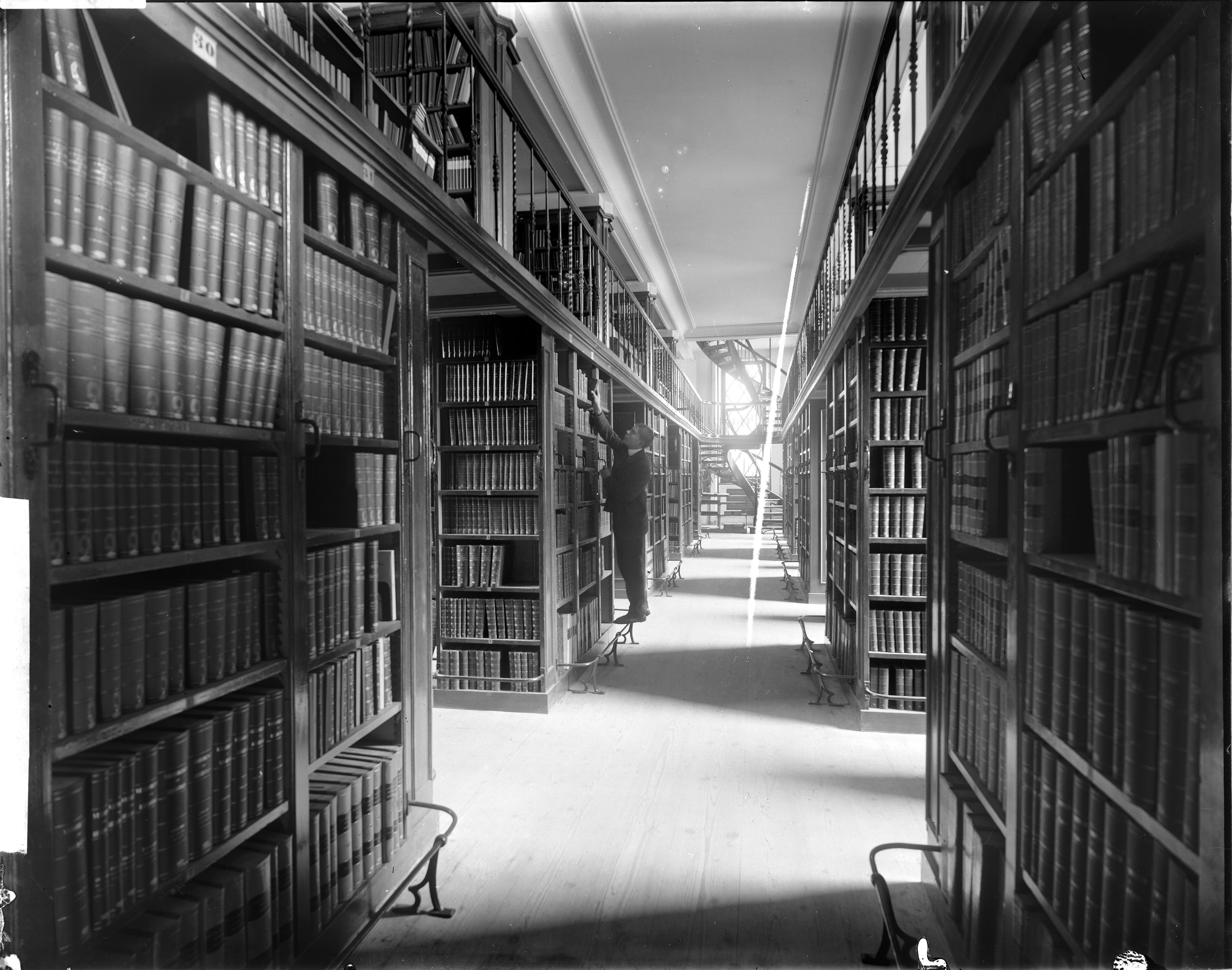
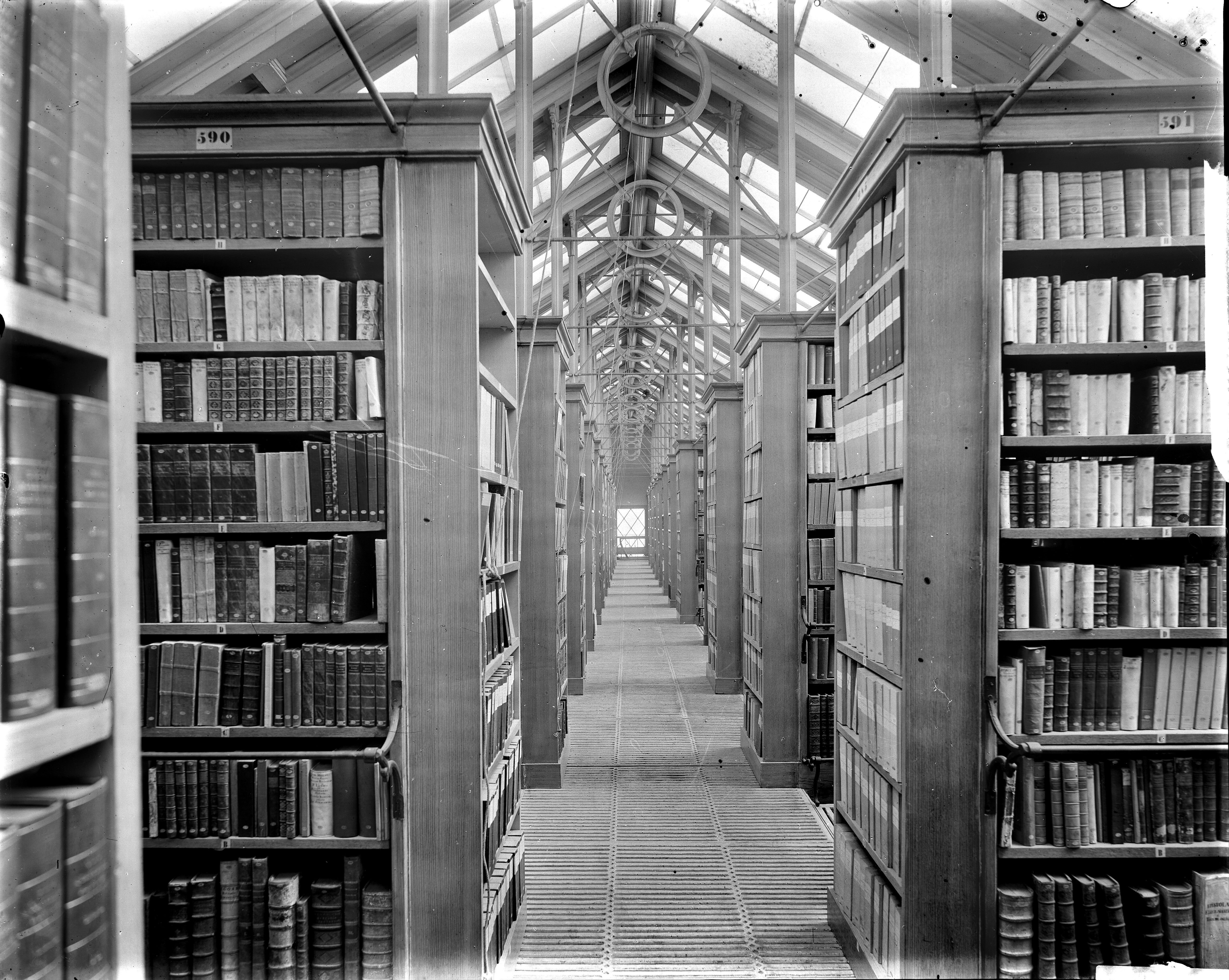
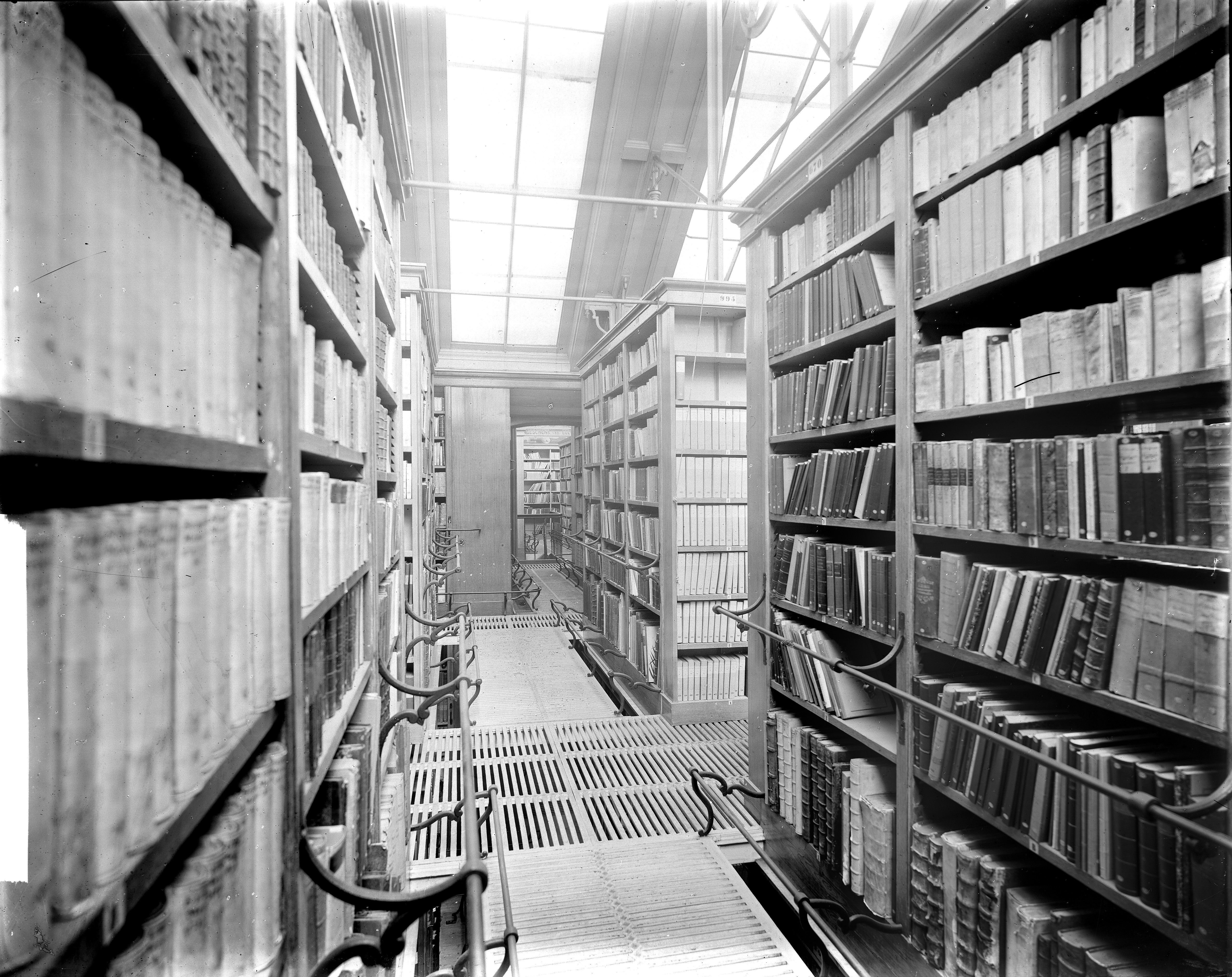
Van Wijk set out to expand Leiden University Library, which was lacking in books on Russia and Russian history.

Van Wijk moved from The Hague on 23 December 1913 to Leiden, near the Hooglandse Kerk. There, he planned a massive trip through the Slavic-speaking world and obtain books for the Leiden University Library, which was so lacking in books on Russia and its history that Uhlenbeck had called any effort to learn about Russia there "without exaggeration, impossible". Van Wijk secured funding from the minister of internal affairs and the Committee for the Administration of the Leiden University Fund and set off, traveling to Leipzig first, where he stayed for two days while he met with Brugmann, Leskien, Windisch, and Eduard Sievers. While there, he attended Gustav Weigand's seminars on the governments of the Tsardom of Bulgaria and Kingdom of Romania, and spent a significant time with Sievers and Leskien; Leskien in particular gave Van Wijk significant direction and provided him with several persons of interest that he later contacted during the travels. During the entirety of the trip, he maintained a written correspondence with the university librarian S. G. de Vries to whom he regularly reported.

From there, Van Wijk traveled to Prague. He reportedly enjoyed his stay and reported that the work being done there put Charles University among the "foremost centers of philology in the world". Van Wijk communed with Josef Zubatý and his student Oldřich Hujer, who gave him recommendations on where to procure books while he was in the area that later became the Czech Republic. While there, he met with several prominent scholars, including Josef Janko, Josef Vajs, and Reinhold Trautmann. From Prague, Van Wijk traveled on to Warsaw, then a part of Russian-occupied Poland, spending three days there and collaborating with several locals in search of books, most notably the Belarusian linguist Yefim Karsky. Van Wijk reported that he had enjoyed his time in Warsaw and was impressed by the robustness of Polish studies, which under Russian rule was entirely privately funded whereas Russian studies were state-funded.

Following Warsaw, Van Wijk proceeded to Saint Petersburg, where he was received by the Dutch envoy, Arthur Martin Désiré baron Sweerts de Landas Wyborgh. There, the environment was not as friendly as it had been in Czech and Polish regions; there was still significant pushback from Van Wijk's having been chosen over Croiset van der Kop. Still, Van Wijk was able to acquire several important pieces of Russian linguistic work during his trip, including an important Dutch–Russian dictionary which was presented to Van Wijk by a relative of the original author who had died. From there, he was guided by Lev Shcherba, who pointed Van Wijk in the direction of some recordings that Croiset van der Kop's will did not appear to have been changed from their original bequeathal to Leiden. Although his welcome was more harsh than his previous stops, Van Wijk reported that he was treated exceptionally well by at least three of Croiset van der Kop's supporters in Russia – Fortunatov, Baudouin de Courtenay, and Shakhmatov; Van Wijk gave particular praise to Shakhmatov, citing both his intellect and thoughtfulness. After meeting with Bychkov and Ernest Radlov, Van Wijk traveled onward to Moscow where he stayed for two weeks with the same widow that had held him up during his first trip in 1903. During this trip, he communed with several old and new contacts, most notably Fyodor Korsh and Dmitry Ushakov. This was followed by a day trip to Kharkiv, where he met both Stephen Kulbakin and Jānis Endzelīns which he later recounted as a "truly memorable" and "charming reception"; Endzelīns left a lasting impact following a reading from his native Latvian, as Van Wijk noticed a third intonation whereas standard Latvian only differentiates between two.

Van Wijk then departed to Kiev (modern-day Kyiv, Ukraine), where he lodged for four days at the Hotel François across from the Kyiv Opera House. While there, he met with V. A. Kordt, a Dutch-speaking Russian who headed the University of Kyiv's library and had previously collaborated with Uhlenbeck. He also met with George Ilinskiy, Vladimir Peretz, and Timofej Florinskij, all of whom provided Van Wijk with gifts for his trip. He also became somewhat acquainted with the Ukrainian language during his trip, most notably with a bookseller who responded to Van Wijk's Russian in Ukrainian. Then traveling to Lemberg (modern-day Lviv, Ukraine), Van Wijk described a tense intellectual life where Polish and Ukrainian scholars purposefully ignored and avoided each other. At the time, the city was primarily Polish while its outskirts were heavily Ukrainian. Lemberg was important to Van Wijk's journey; Ukrainian texts censored by the Russian Empire were being freely printed in Lemberg and the Shevchenko Scientific Society had developed "a terrific atmosphere of activity" according to him. He was able to meet up with Mykhailo Hrushevsky twice, whom he reported was helpful. The city also provided Van Wijk with Polish places of interest, namely the Ossoliński Institute under the leadership of Wojciech Kętrzyński. Kętrzyński sent Van Wijk off with a small library worth of books at no cost; Van Wijk wrote to the library in Leiden, which funded the transport of books from his trip: "The transport costs should not be too much for the library to bear. In any case, they will bear no relation to the value of what is being sent!"

Major stops on Van Wijk's tour of Eastern Europe before his return to the Netherlands
1. Leiden
2. Leipzig
3. Prague
4. Warsaw
5. Saint Petersburg
6. Moscow
7. Kharkiv
8. Kyiv
9. Lviv
10. Bucharest
11. Sofia
12. Belgrade
13. Zagreb
14. Ljubljana
15. Graz
16. Vienna
17. Kraków
18. Zakopane

From Lemberg, Van Wijk continued on to Bucharest for one day, though remarked that one day had been sufficient and only visited one linguist, the Slavist I. Bogdan, during his trip. He then headed on to Sofia where the Dutch chargé d'affaires introduced him to several ambassadors and other public officials of Slavic nations. Van Wijk met several Bulgarian language scholars during his trip, including Lyubomir Miletich, Benyo Tsonev, and Stefan Mladenov. Van Wijk's time in Bulgaria left a lasting impact on him; it was the only place during his 1914 tour of Eastern Europe that he published a retrospective about. In an article for Onze Eeuw, he contrasted the Bulgarian people with his experience with the Russians; the Bulgarians were "industrious, free of the vicious passions of drink and gambling, methodical and orderly [and] seldom abuse one's lack of knowledge of the language or local circumstances for his own advantage". He referred to Russians as "superstitious idolaters" by contrast and commented negatively on the architectural design of Saint Alexander Nevsky Cathedral, which had been built in a Russian architectural style, writing that it was "as ill-suited to its surroundings as they are to it".

Van Wijk continued on to Belgrade, where he was received by the Serbian Ministry of Foreign Affairs and later by Stojan Novaković, President of the Serbian Academy of Sciences, whom Van Wijk regarded as "possibly the greatest politician of the Balkans". Novaković advised him to write to several institutions around and assured him his requests would be fulfilled. While Van Wijk met with limited success during his time in Serbia, he expressed frustration that the timing of his trip had been poor; several scholars he had intended to meet – namely Aleksandar Belić, who had promised Van Wijk he would be a "faithful guide if [he] ever came to Belgrade" – were in Macedonia on a government-funded expedition.

Van Wijk then traveled to Agram (modern-day Zagreb, Croatia), then a part of the Austro-Hungarian Empire, where he was similarly confronted with absentee intellectuals he had intended to meet. Still, his trip was not a failure by his own admission; he was able to visit and become a member of the national scientific society, Matica Hrvatska ('The Croatian Center'). For an annual fee of six crowns, Van Wijk supplied the library in Leiden with six or seven books a year from Croatia. He met briefly with Franjo Fancev to discuss the Kajkavian dialect which was native to the area in and around Agram, before continuing on to Laibach (modern-day Ljubljana, Slovenia) for a day. Van Wijk met with Fran Ilešič, chairman of the Slovenian equivalent of Matica Hrvatska, and Oton Župančič before entering Austria proper following the assassination of Archduke Franz Ferdinand, though he makes no mention of the event in his report and appears to have been completely ignorant that it happened. Van Wijk made a pitstop in Graz to meet Hugo Schuchardt, Matija Murko, and Rudolf Meringer, all of whom Van Wijk held much respect for, though he distanced himself from Meringer's school of thought with respect to sound laws. From Graz, he traveled on to Vienna where he met with the Croatian linguist Vatroslav Jagić, whom Van Wijk described in his report thus: "No other Slavist scholar knows the terrain, in all its scope, better than he". That Jagić opposed Van Wijk's appointment to the chair does not appear to have been the object of any ill will; Van Wijk's report writes of Jagić in glowing terms and Jagić gave Van Wijk several gifts before his departure. While in Vienna, he met with Paul Kretschmer and Wilhelm Meyer-Lübke. When word finally reached him about Franz Ferdinand's assassination, he wrote that he had found the political conversations with the local Viennese Croats and Slovenes informed him greatly.

His last official stop put him in Kraków and found himself again warmly received by his Polish counterparts, though he received fewer material goods from the Academy of Sciences in Kraków than during his other stops. He met with Jan Michał Rozwadowski, Kazimierz Nitsch, and Jan Łoś, whom he described as "vying with each other to ingratiate themselves and to help me". Van Wijk ended his trip with several weeks in Zakopane in the Tatra Mountains of Poland with Wiktor Porzeziński, a linguist at University of Moscow. Van Wijk had planned to make stops in Posnan and Berlin before returning to the Netherlands, but the outbreak of World War I forced him to return home with haste, arriving on 3 August. His final comments in his report remark that the tour went "beyond his expectations" in completing a subject library for the university and establishing contacts across Eastern Europe. He wrote: "And if I succeed in getting people to understand that; in other words, if I can make the reader see how a journey of few months, staying in many cities only a few days, is nevertheless sufficient to produce such fantastic results for our national scholarship, then I have achieved all I could wish."

== World War I ==
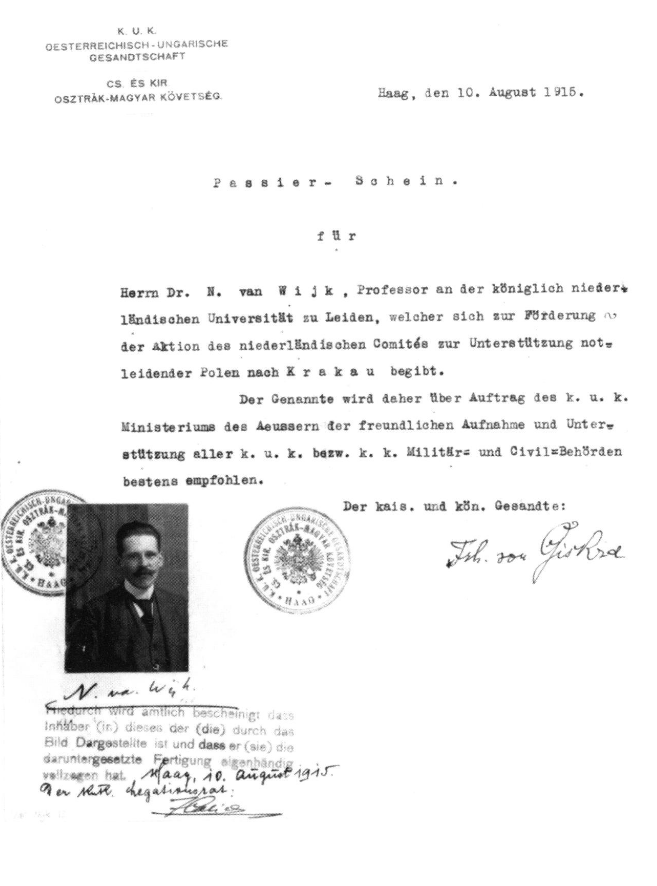
A curfew pass issued to Van Wijk by the Austro-Hungarian envoy allowing him passage to Poland

A few days before Van Wijk's return, the Netherlands began its mobilization for World War I. Following its outbreak, Van Wijk joined the Dutch Committee for the Philanthropic Support of Poland (Dutch: Nederlandsch Comité voor Philantropischen Steun aan Polen), becoming the organization's vice chairman shortly thereafter, and began making arrangements to provide humanitarian aid to Poland. In August 1915, the Austro-Hungarian embassy issued him a curfew pass (German: Passierschein) to travel there on behalf of the committee to assist "destitute Poles". Although his curfew pass only gave explicit permission to pass into Kraków, he pushed to assist Welfare Committee in Posnan (German: Wohlfahrtsausschuss in Posen) first; the Dutch ambassador to the German Empire recommended him to the proper authorities and the request was ultimately granted. In Van Wijk's first ever piece for a newspaper, writing for the Nieuwe Rotterdamsche Courant on 15 September, he wrote a retrospective about his time traveling to Poland, providing a glimpse into the human toll of the war:

A year ago, Glów was a prosperous village with fine farmhouses built in stone below and wooden upper floor of the type that is tytpical of this region, but today Glów stands no higher than 10 centimetres [4 in] above the ground: the foundations of houses, nothing more. [...] The man [who spoke on behalf of the village] told us of the long nights when bullets and shrapnel and shells flew over the village; and when this hell had passed by, Glów no longer existed. And now? The horses are gone, the meadows are gone, the houses are gone, there is no corn, what there was had been rotted by hailstorm because there were no more barns to store it in. [...] Nothing has made a more sinister impression on me than the deadly silence in this village that had been wiped from the face of the earth, where a few hungry souls clad in rags remained to kiss our hand meekly (as is the habit in these parts) and tell us that they had nothing anymore. Faced with such dire misery all human love seems powerless!

As vice chairman, Van Wijk worked with chairman J. H. C. Kern of the Dutch committee and Henryk Sienkiewicz of the Polish committee to provide aid across the Eastern Front and oversee donations secured from the Netherlands. Some donors had expressed concern about how the funds were being used, but Van Wijk confirmed the funds were being used in a "thrifty, well-organized" manner and that no group was receiving preferential treatment. Following his return to the Netherlands, Van Wijk vigorously defended Poland from its critics, in one case going so far as to say that "the division of Poland is an offense against God". At one point, the Catholic Archbishop of Lviv, Józef Bilczewski, requested Van Wijk's assistance in getting twenty wagonloads of rice that were being held in Rotterdam released to Poland.

The war does not appear to have negatively impacted Van Wijk's ability to commune with his recent contacts throughout Europe; although a letter from Zakopane had been intercepted by English censors and he declined to send an article to Jagić since doing so would be "a bit dangerous", he appears to have been able to correspond with Jagić shortly after the war's start and was able to act as a go-between for some others.

Sometime in 1916, Van Wijk published an article entitled "Zur sekundären steigenden Intonation im Slavischen, vornehmlich in ursprünglich kurzen Silben" ('On secondary rising intonation in Slavic, primarily in originally short syllables'), which later became the basis for what is now known as Van Wijk's law. Although tentatively suggested by Aleksey Shakhmatov in 1898, Van Wijk is credited with developing the law further and was later honored with the name.

In the summer of 1917, Van Wijk made a trip to Berlin and visited Marcus van Blankenstein, probably to offer him a professorship in Leiden which he declined. On 1 October, Van Wijk was rejected by the Dutch Home Guard due to "physical unsuitability". Beginning early the following year, Van Wijk's father and his two sisters, Cornelia Petronella and Catharina, died within roughly four months of each other.

== Interwar period ==
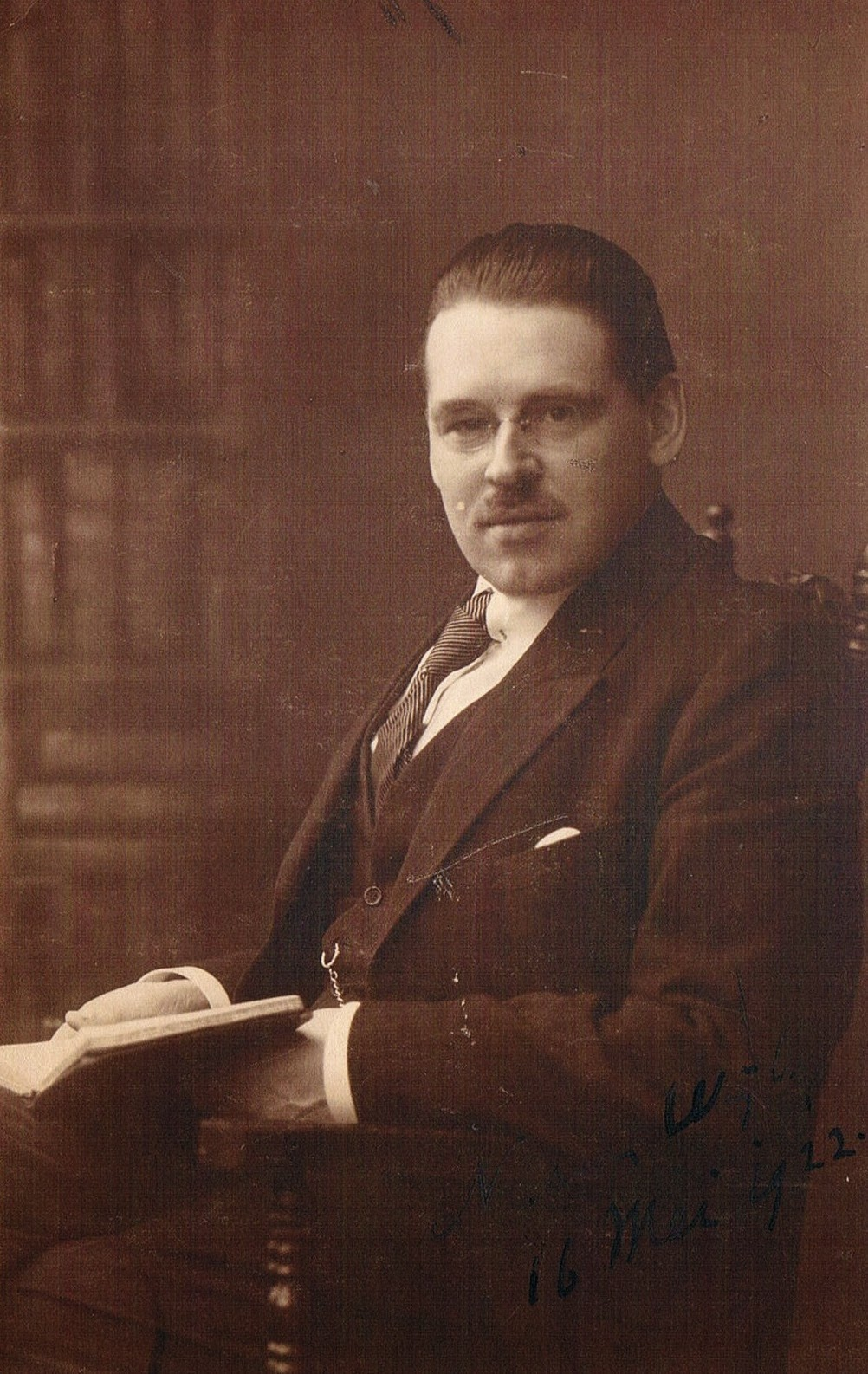
Van Wijk in 1922

During the interwar period, Van Wijk returned to publications, writing in journals across Europe. Despite his long-standing interest in Russian literature and language, only three pieces of his were published in Russia after the Bolsheviks seized power in 1917. During the war, Van Wijk had developed a fascination with Slavic accentology culminating in his 1923 book Die baltischen und slavischen Akzent- und Intonationssysteme. Ein Beitrag zur Erforschung der baltisch-slavischen Verwandtschaftsverhältnisse ('The Baltic and Slavic Accent and Intonation Systems: A Contribution to the Study of Balto-Slavic Relationships'), which enjoyed wide readership and acclaim from the relatively small cluster of Slavists at the time, arguing that the Baltic and Slavic languages were once – however briefly – joined in a double-jointed proto-language. Van Ginnekin praised the book for "shin[ing] a pin-prick of light into the prehistoric darkness" and commended Van Wijk's tireless efforts.

Beginning in 1922, Van Wijk became the first president of the Dutch branch of the International Committee on Intellectual Cooperation founded by the League of Nations. The following year, Van Wijk began taking care of two brothers, Vladimir Zatskoy and his younger brother Leonid. (Note: The surname is sometimes spelled "Zatskoj".) The Zatskoy brothers were Russian refugees, the sons of Pyotr, a tanner-turned-mayor who knew Van Wijk. Vladimir was a Russian Revolution veteran who lied about his age to join the White Army. He achieved the rank of captain before studying law at the Sorbonne and the University of Prague, believing communism in Russia would quickly collapse and he could practice law there. The mêlée following the Revolution left him without official documents, forcing him to use a Nansen passport as a stateless citizen. Leonid, on the other hand, was able to retain Soviet citizenship. Van Wijk became close with the brothers, variously referring to them as "foster sons" or "nephews". Leonid suffered from some kind of respiratory disease; Van Wijk regularly visited him in Czechoslovakia, where the air was purportedly healthier for his condition, and when he was hospitalized in Leiden. Whatever the illness was, Van Wijk expected Leonid to recover from it, but he ultimately died following a surgery on 13 October 1927. His death devastated Van Wijk, who had hoped he would make a full recovery. Although Vladimir appears to have initially turned to fraud to support himself, Van Wijk gave him work first as a translator of Russian literature to be published in newspapers like Het Vaderland ('The Fatherland') before getting him work as a Russian-language teacher. He also served as Van Wijk's personal assistant before setting him up to sell medical equipment sometime in the 1930s.

In 1924, Van Wijk was under suspicion by Dutch authorities of being a communist sympathizer for his charitable works with Russians and other Eastern Europeans in town and his travels throughout Eastern Europe. In June, the Dutch Ministry of Foreign Affairs requested to clarify his purpose for travel, which prompted the Dutch envoy in Warsaw to respond harshly that "Professor Van Wijk has not only not entertained communist sympathies, he has condemned [communism] in the strongest terms". This did not appear to sway the government's opinion; on 14 November, Leiden's police commissioner wrote about the concern to the attorney general of the court of justice in The Hague:

Although there was never proof to be had in Leiden that Professor VAN WIJK has held communist sympathies, it was frequently drawn to our attention that the said professor on any occasions received, assisted, and even frequently accommodated for considerable periods, unkempt individuals of the East European population. Most of these persons did not belong to the social class of Professor VAN WIJK. Understandably, I therefore wished to be further informed concerning the comings and goings of the said gentleman in foreign countries to which he frequently travels.

During the war, Van Wijk had assisted a Polish Jew named Jacob Ginsberg, a refugee from Kovno (modern-day Kaunas, Lithuania). The help Van Wijk provided allowed Ginsberg to become a bookseller in Leiden in 1922. Due to his association with Van Wijk, Ginsberg was also mentioned by the police commissioner in 1924 and both ultimately fell under the surveillance of the Dutch Central Intelligence Service. Ginsberg served as a long-time point of contact for academic literature for Van Wijk, who often pointed his colleagues in Ginsberg's direction. In 1925, Van Wijk reported that he had been denied a visa to the Soviet Union for his anti-communist beliefs.

In 1929, Van Wijk was appointed to be the rector magnificus of the university. At Princess Juliana's reception following her receiving an honorary doctorate the following January, Queen Wilhelmina presented him with a nomination for Commander of the House of Orange which she later presented to him personally. In 1932, he was made a Knight of the Order of the Netherlands Lion. Around this time, Van Wijk kept regular correspondence with the princess and was regularly given audiences with the royal family and associated government officials and represented the university officially.

Van Wijk, unlike his mentor Uhlenbeck, usually shied away from fieldwork, but during the winter of 1930 and 1931, he was shown two sheets in Serbian Old Church Slavonic on the Desert Fathers which piqued his interest. His work led him to stay at a monastery in Dalmatia for two weeks in August 1934 to study a manuscript kept there; the resulting publication was Van Wijk's only contribution in the field written in Serbo-Croatian. Atypical of Slavists at the time, the piece focuses not only on the linguistic elements of the language, but includes textual analysis and lexicology. At some point during the late 1930s, Van Wijk wrote and completed a critical manuscript on the Skete Patericon, an Old Church Slavonic translation of the Ancient Greek text Andrō̂n hagíōn bíblos (Ἀνδρῶν ἁγίων βίβλος lit. 'Book of Holy Men'), which was believed by some to be translated by Saint Methodius. His work on the patericons led to his publishing more work in Byzantine studies.

During this period, Van Wijk began working more on the classification and taxonomy of the Slavic languages. He held that there was no good reason to distinguish the Czech and Slovak languages from a linguistic point of view, treating both as ends of a dialect continuum, and questioned the validity of Byelorussian as distinct from Russian, comparing it to the divergent Saxonian–Overijssel dialect in the Netherlands. In December 1936, he delivered several lectures at the Sorbonne in Paris on the origin and development of the Slavic languages which were later published as articles in the journal Le monde slave ('The Slavic World') and later as a book, Les langues slaves: de l'unité à la pluralité ('The Slavic Languages: From Unity to Plurality'), published in 1937. The piece is considered to be among his worst; Van Wijk's command of French was poor compared to his German and he did not mark for footnotes throughout, though he recanted his belief about Byelorussian by calling it "a literary language of its own" and his understanding of transitional dialects between Czech and Polish and between Bulgarian and Serbian helped to illustrate his taxonomic and developmental theory of the Slavic languages.

== Final years ==
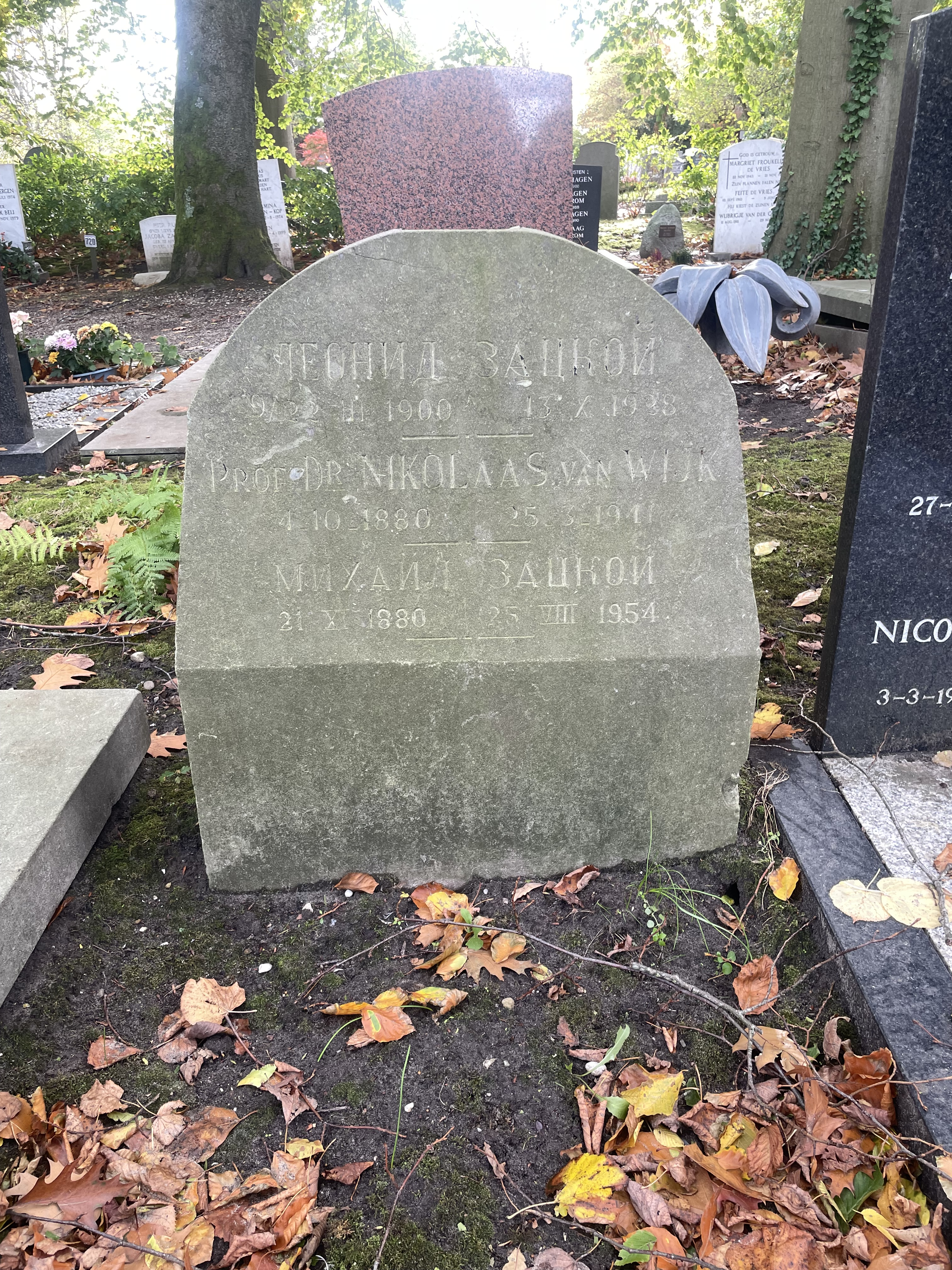
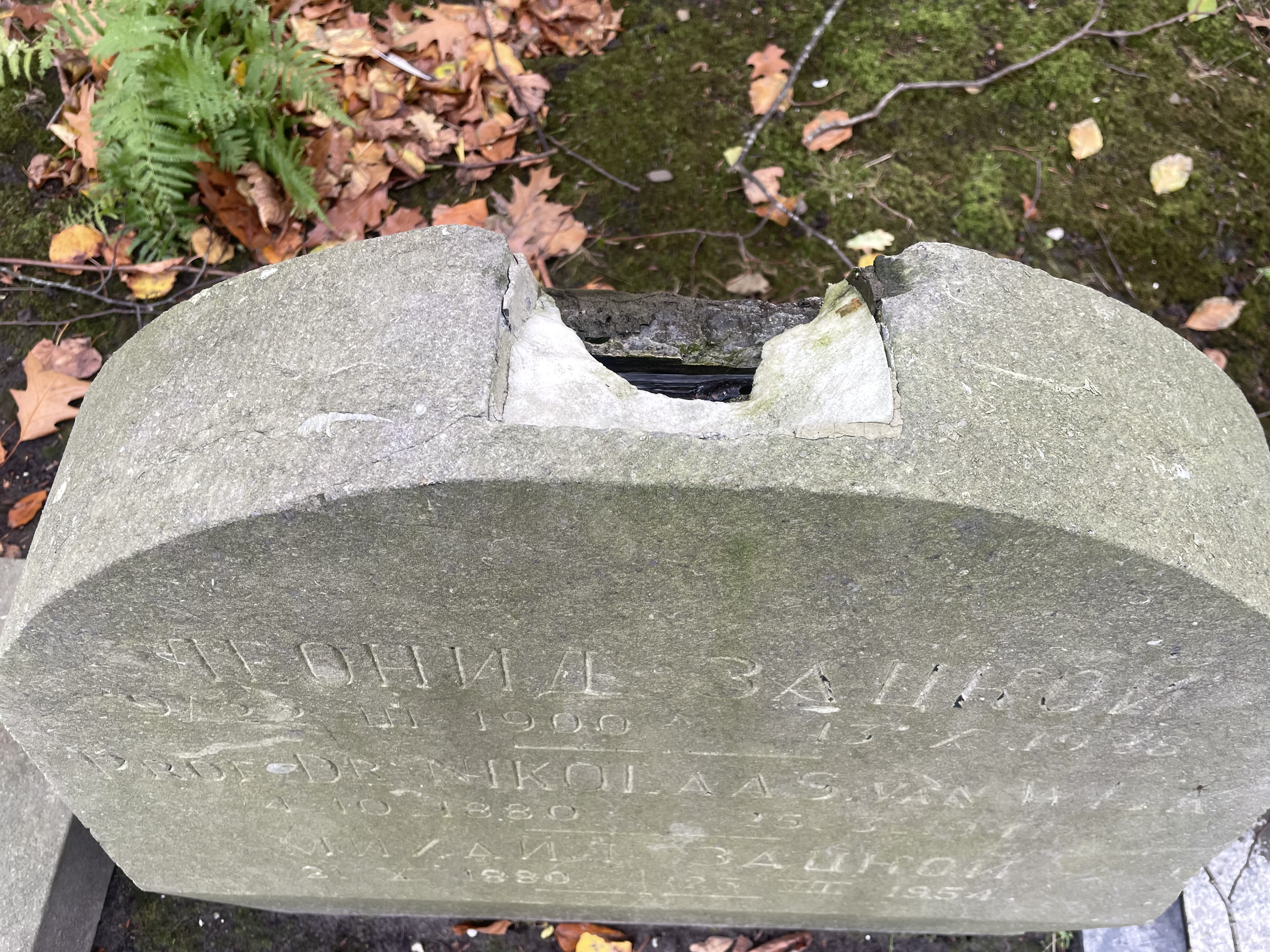
Van Wijk and the Zatskoy brothers' gravestone in Rhijnhof cemetery was removed in 1977 for lack of payment, (Note: In the Netherlands, it is custom to remove graves that are not maintained financially.) but it was returned in 1989, funded by Slavists at Leiden University in part through its Croiset van der Kop Fund. The top originally had an Orthodox cross, but it is no longer present.

Following the outbreak of World War II, Van Wijk attempted to get a visa to extract his Jewish colleague Roman Jakobson from Czechoslovakia. Van Wijk tried, but failed, to get the Dutch Ministry of Justice to assist Prokop Maxa and his family in their extraction from Sofia, but they were able to escape for Paris, where Van Wijk visited them before they eventually found safety in London. The German army soon invaded and swiftly defeated the Netherlands, bringing the nation under a full occupation. The occupation led to serious financial trouble for Uhlenbeck, but Van Wijk was able to provide assistance for him. Following the start of the occupation, Van Wijk declined a visiting professorship at Columbia University in New York City, writing in English:

During the terrible days we passed this week I compared my present situation with that of a New York professor, but although it was very bad here, I think it is better to be at home at such a time of temptation. If I had accepted your invitation, I should have felt guilty for having run away from my country at a moment of national danger. [...] I think there will be so much work to be done that a good Dutchman should not leave his country. But I assure you that, if scientific and academic life should become impossible in Holland I should not prefer any other work to teaching Slavic languages in Columbia University.

Although the general atmosphere was bleak, his former student F. B. J. Kuiper reports that Van Wijk remained "basically optimistic", believing that the social order dominated by national borders would become less prominent in the post-war era. In 1940, Kuiper began planning a Festschrift in his honor and let Van Wijk know, but the plan was interrupted by the war and did not see publication until 1988.

On 22 March 1941, Van Wijk fell ill after a dinner with Eduard Meijers, a Jewish law professor whose dismissal caused the university to be shut down in protest. Van Wijk was taken to the Diaconessenhuis hospital on 24 March, but died on 25 March. (Note: It is unclear precisely what the illness was. Intestinal cancer and thrombosis have both been suggested, but the only official report indicates a stomach hemorrhage.) Van Wijk's death was unexpected and news of his death was quickly publicized; his death was front-page news on the Nieuwe Rotterdamsche Courant and the Leidsch Dagblad published a two-page biography. Etty Hillesum, a former student of Van Wijk's and later victim of the Holocaust at Auschwitz, wrote in her diary about the shock she experienced upon hearing of Van Wijk's death:

My God, how could this happen – Van Wijk passed away. The shock is so great that I have lost all feeling. And one cannot yet look into the chasm that has suddenly opened up. All I can say to myself, again and again: I don't understand, I just don't understand at all. A world of scholarship that has suddenly, soundlessly collapsed, just like that. It seems to me worse than the whole war, even though I know I shall have to retract those words later on. [...] Yet for me a part of the world has collapsed and I sit looking at it, aghast and numbed.

He was buried in Leiden in a Russian Orthodox funeral on 29 March. He was buried in Rhijnhof cemetery in Leiden with Leonid and Mikhail Zatskoy. Byvanck and Kuiper were the only two chosen to eulogize, but the funeral was reportedly packed. At the beginning of the funeral, the Leidsche Courant reported that "a minor political incident" broke out, but it did not elaborate further as to the nature or parties involved. Less than a month later, Van Wijk's housekeeper and tenant, Maria Keszy-Wenzel, committed suicide. When Kuiper informed Uhlenbeck of Van Wijk's death, Uhlenbeck responded: "He has gathered an excellent karma." Following the end of the war in 1945, there were several rumors surrounding Van Wijk's death. Prokop Maxa, for example, falsely reported during an in memoriam segment for the BBC that Van Wijk had been killed by the Gestapo and Roman Jakobson wrote that he had been killed by German occupation forces.

In 1929, Van Wijk had named Vladimir Zatskoy as his sole beneficiary in his last will and testament. The will bequeathed everything he owned to Zatskoy except his personal library, which was to be given to the Leiden University Library. The library received about 7,000 books from Van Wijk's estate.

== Personal life and views ==
Although Van Wijk was regarded as personable and extroverted, he was particularly reluctant to share details about his personal life. He was widely considered unconventional for the time, though highly regarded. He left a notably small archive following his death; he wrote very little about himself, writing nothing about his childhood and very little about his professional life. He wrote "nothing at all" about his life's work's importance to him. He never married. During his lifetime, Van Wijk published over 600 works covering a broad spectrum of topics; about fifty of these focused on Slavic literature, with all but three intended for a Dutch-speaking audience. Aside from his native Dutch, Van Wijk published work in German, French, Czech, Polish, and Russian. He preferred to write in German and found the linguistic nationalism of France to be a persistent annoyance. Along with Uhlenbeck, Van Wijk helped to establish Leiden University as a powerhouse of linguistics. Van Wijk was known as a teetotaler, though it is unclear how strictly he followed this belief during his travels in Eastern Europe. Aside from his profession, Van Wijk was an amateur pianist and served as a judge for final examinations at the university's academy of music.

Van Wijk spent a significant part of his life corresponding through letters; according to him, several hours a day were spent doing so. Only a handful of his letters have survived. Some of his work he had purposefully destroyed, namely the archive from his time with the Dutch Committee in Poland following the German invasion of the Netherlands. Jan Paul Hinrichs, Van Wijk's biographer, suggests that most of Van Wijk's letters were similarly destroyed since it appears that the majority of the surviving letters were for matters Van Wijk was dealing with shortly before his death.

At least two of Van Wijk's major works remain missing. The first is the second half of his Geschichte der altkirchenslavischen Sprache (Zweiter Band: Syntax, Wortschatz und Wortbildung) ('History of the Old Church Slavonic Language [Volume Two: Syntax, Vocabulary, and Word Formation]'), completed in 1927 but never published and likely perished somewhere in Germany during World War II. The second is Die Vokale i und y in den ostslavischen und den anderen slavischen Sprachen ('The Vowels *i and *y in the East Slavic and Other Slavic Languages') which was supposed to be included in a Festschrift for the Ukrainian linguist Ivan Zilynskyy in 1939 but appears to also have been lost during the war.

=== Views on Russian politics ===
During his time at Leiden, Van Wijk was suspected of being a communist by the Leiden Police due to his charity towards impoverished Eastern Europeans. In reality, he was a strict liberal; he criticized autocracy under the tsar and – once the Russian Revolution had begun – found himself unsympathetic towards any side, finding both intolerably unrepresentative of the Russian people. Despite his strong opposition to the Bolsheviks, Van Wijk remained friendly with those who were sympathetic to the movement, most notably his students Jan Romein, Annie Romein-Verschoor, and Francis de Graaff. Following the Revolution, Van Wijk never returned to visit Russia.

=== Sexuality ===
Some scholars have speculated that Van Wijk may have been homosexual. An article in Van Wijk's 1988 Festschrift by Ton van den Baar appears to be the first discussion of this possibility. Van Wijk lived with other single men – mostly notably Cornelis van Arendonk and W. H. Strassers, who together with Van Wijk formed "an inseparable trio" – for the majority of his life, never married, held an extremely close relationship with Leonid Zatskoy, and no information about his relationships with women have been found. These have all been cited as cause for speculation. He does not appear to have been considered such during his lifetime or after his death and there does not appear any evidence to suggest he was.

=== Religious tolerance ===
Although raised by a family of Reformed preachers, Van Wijk did not hold any strong feelings of animosity towards people of other religions. In 1915, his attempt to get Van Ginneken, a Catholic priest, to succeed Verdam as professor at Leiden University failed and, when he informed Van Ginneken, he wrote: "You know of course as well as I do that in all such cases being a Jesuit is for many a latent source of antipathy! For me personally it does not count in the least". Similarly, his first doctoral student, A. E. Boutelje, was Jewish and many of Van Wijk's Jewish friends and students were killed in the Holocaust; Jacob Ginsberg, Leo Polak, Etty Hillesum, and Boutelje all died in concentration camps.

== Honors ==
- – Knight of the Order of the Netherlands Lion
- – Commander of the House of Orange
- – Golden Laurel of the Polish Academy of Literature (Poland)
- – Commander of the Order of the White Lion (Czechoslovakia)

== Selected works ==
- Van Wijk, N. (1904). "De Hamlets van de Russische letterkunde" [The Hamlets of Russian Literature]. De Gids (in Dutch). 68: 442–487.
- ——— (1907). "Over het Russische volkskarakter" [On the Character of the Russian People]. De Tijdspiegel (in Dutch). 64: 155–180.
- ——— (1908). "Russische indrukken" [Russian Impressions]. De Gids (in Dutch). 72: 463–502.
- ——— (1912). "Over dialektgrenzen" [On Dialect Boundaries]. De Nieuwe Taalgids (in Dutch). 6: 113–126.
- ——— (1912). Franck's Etymologisch Woordenboek der Nederlandsche Taal [Franck's Etymological Dictionary of the Dutch Language] (in Dutch). The Hague: Martinus Nijhoff.
- ——— (1918). Altpreussische Studien: Beiträge zur baltischen und zur vergleichenden indogermanischen Grammatik [Old Prussian Studies: Essays on Baltic and Comparative Indo-European Grammar] (in German).
- ——— (1923). Die baltischen und slavischen Akzent- und Intonationssysteme [Baltic and Slavic Accentual and Intonational Systems] (in German). Amsterdam: Koninklijke Akademie van Wetenschappen.
- ——— (1931). Geschichte der altkirchenslavischen Sprache. Erster Band: Laut- und Formenlehre [History of Old Church Slavonic. Vol. 1: Phonology and Morphology] (in German). Berlin und Leipzig: Walter de Gruyter & Co.
- ——— (1934). "Rukopisni paterik manastira Krke" [The Manuscript Patericon at the Krka Monastery]. Magazin Sjeverne Dalmacije (in Serbo-Croatian). 2: 108–110.
- ——— (1939). Phonologie: Een Hoofdstuk uit de Structurele Taalwetenschap [Phonology: A Chapter on Structural Linguistics] (in Dutch). The Hague: Martinus Nijhoff.
