= Richard Constant Boer =

Dutch linguist (1863–1929)

R. C. Boer
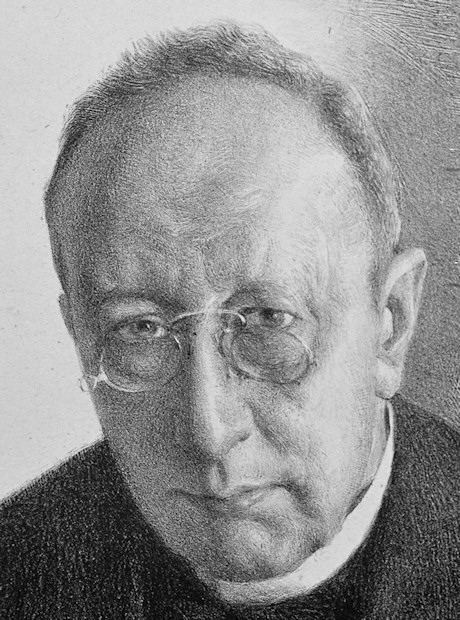
- Born: 31 January 1863; Warnsveld, Netherlands
- Died: 20 August 1929 (aged 66); Amsterdam, Netherlands
- Occupations: Linguist, philologist, literature professor

Academic background
- Education: University of Groningen
- Thesis: Ǫrvar-Odds Saga (1888)

Academic work
- Doctoral students: Nicolaas van Wijk
- Main interests: Old Norse

Richard Constant Boer (31 January 1863 – 20 August 1929) was a Dutch linguist who specialized in Old Norse.

== Academic history ==
Boer received his Ph.D. in 1888 from the University of Groningen for his edition of Örvar-Odds saga. From 1888 to 1900, he taught Dutch and geography at the gymnasium in Leeuwarden. He was also a professor of Old Norse at Groningen from 1894 to 1900, and after 1900, professor of Old Germanic and Sanskrit at the University of Amsterdam.

In 1921, the study of Scandinavian languages was officially established at the University of Amsterdam. R.C. Boer maintained his focus on Old Norse and Old Norse literature, and in the 1920s, his teaching extended to the modern Scandinavian languages (Danish, Norwegian, and Swedish) and their literature. He died on the 20th August 1929 in Amsterdam, at the age of 66.

== Publications ==
- Örvar-Odds Saga (Leiden: E.J. Brill, 1888)
- Bjarnar saga Hítdoelakappa (Halle A.S.: M. Niemeyer. 1893)
- Ívens saga (Chrétien de Troyes) (Halle A.S.: M. Niemeyer. 1898)
- Grettis Saga Asmundarsonar (Halle A.S.: M. Niemeyer. 1900)
- Untersuchungen über den Ursprung und die Entwicklung der Nibelungensage (3 vols.; Halle A.S. Verlag der Buchhandlung des Waisenhauses. 1906, 1907, 1909)
- De Liederen van Hildebrand en Hadubrand (Johannes Müller. 1909)
- Die Sagen von Ermanarich und Dietrich von Bern (Halle a.d.S.: Buchhandlung des Weisenhauses. 1910)
- Methodologische Bemerkunger über die Untersuchung der Heldensage: Eine Auseinandersetzung mit Andreas Heusler (Amsterdam: Johannes Müller. 1911)
- Die Altenglische Heldendichtung: Béowulf (Halle a.d.S.: Buchhandlung des Waisenhauses. 1912)
- Studiën over de Metriek van het Alliteratievers (Amsterdam: Johannes Müller. 1916)
- Korte Deensche Spraakkunst (Haarlem: H.D.T. Willink & Zoon. 1918)
- Syncope en Consonantengeminatie: Studiën over Oudnoorsche Spraakleer (Tijdschrift voor Nederlandsche Taal- en Letterkunde 37. E.J. Brill. 1918. pp. 161–222)
- Oudnoorsch Handboek (Haarlem: H.D.T. Willink & Zoon. 1920)
- Die Edda: Einleitung und Text (Haarlem: H.D.T. Willink & Zoon. 1922)
- Die Edda mit Historisch-Kritischem Commentar (Haarlem: H.D.T. Willink & Zoon. 1922)
- Noorwegens Letterkunde in de Negentiende Eeuw. De Erven F. Bohn. 1922.
- Oergermaansch Handboek (Haarlem: H.D.T. Willink & Zoon. 1924)
