= Valery Pereleshin =

Russian writer and translator (1913–1992)

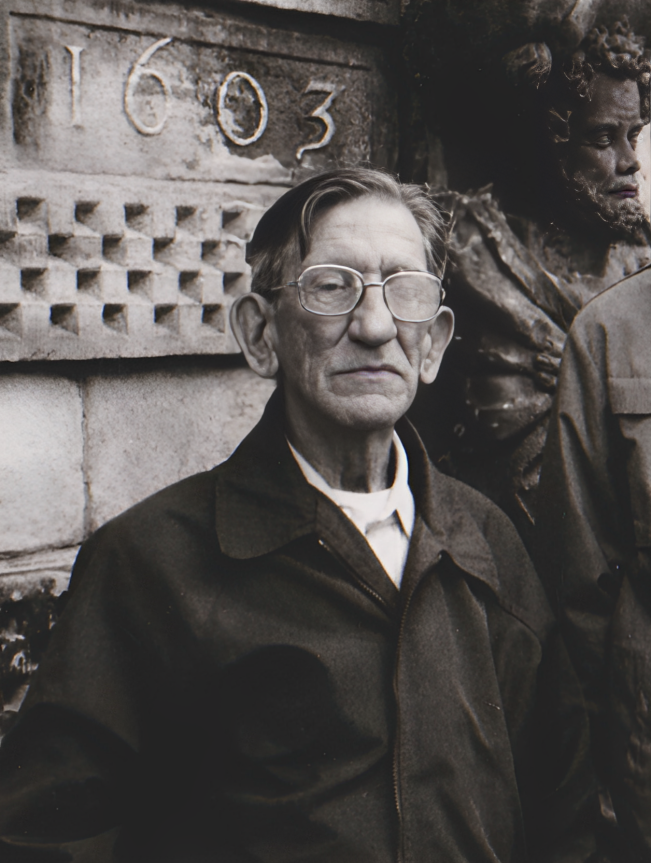
- Pereleshin in Gouda, May 1986
- Born: Valery Frantsevich Salatko-Petrishche; July 20, 1913; Irkutsk, Russian Empire
- Died: November 7, 1992 (aged 79); Rio de Janeiro, Brazil
- Occupations: Poet, translator

Valery Pereleshin (Вале́рий Переле́шин), pseudonym of Valery Frantsevich Salatko-Petrishche (Russian: Вале́рий Фра́нцевич Сала́тко-Петри́ще) (July 20, 1913 – November 7, 1992) was a Russian-Brazilian poet and translator.

== Biography ==
Pereleshin was born in Irkutsk, where his father served as an official of the Siberian railroads. From 1920 to 1939, he resided in Harbin, the railroad hub in Manchuria that grew into a veritable Russian emigrant city after the Russian Civil War. In Harbin, he studied law and learned the Chinese language. He became a monk in a Russian Orthodox monastery there in 1938 under the name German (Герман). In 1939, he moved to Beijing and began working for the Russian Orthodox mission in China. In 1943, he moved to Shanghai, where he worked as an interpreter for the Soviet press agency TASS. In 1950, his attempt to emigrate to the United States failed, as a result he was extradited to China. Subsequently, in 1952, he left for Brazil with his mother, where he learned Portuguese. He worked as a librarian at the British Council in Rio de Janeiro. In 1983, he moved to the suburb Jacarepaguá. He died in 1992.

Pereleshin was absent from Brazil four times: in 1973, he visited France and Belgium; in 1974, he participated in a poetry festival in Texas; in 1986, he was invited to the Netherlands by the Leiden University; and in 1989, he participated in the Poetry International festival in Rotterdam. Through his contact with the Dutch slavist Jan Paul Hinrichs, Pereleshin donated part of his archive to the Leiden University Library, including his the numerous letters sent from Beijing and Shanghai to his mother, who stayed behind in Harbin. Another part of his archive is at the library of the Russian Academy of Sciences in Moscow.

== Career ==
During his lifetime, Pereleshin published thirteen books of poetry and an autobiography in verse. Apart from that, he translated Chinese and Brazilian poetry. He is considered as a master of the sonnet. Besides, he is the author of memoirs on Russian emigrants' literary life in China. In 2018, his collected works were published in Moscow. Under the name Valério Pereliéchin, he published a collection of poems in Portuguese and translated the Alexandrian chants by Mikhail Kuzmin into Portuguese, who was another gay poet just as Pereleshin.

== Bibliography ==
=== Poetry ===
- On the way, (Harbin, 1937) = В пути: Стихи 1932—1937. — Харбин: Заря, 1937 The good beehive, (Harbin, 1939) = Добрый улей: 2-я кн. стихотворений. — Харбин: Изд-во В. В. Плотникова, 1939
- Star over the sea, (Harbin, 1941) = Звезда над морем: 3-я кн. стихотворений. — Харбин: Заря, 1941
- Sacrifice, (Harbin, 1944) = Жертва: 4-я кн. стихотворений. — Харбин: Заря, 1944 Southern house, (Munich, 1968) = Южный дом: 5-я кн. стихотворений. — Мюнхен, 1968
- The swing, (Frankfurt am Main, 1971) = Качель: 6-я кн. стихотворений. — Франкфурт-на-Майне: Посев, 1971.
- The reserve, (Frankfurt am Main, 1972) = Заповедник: 7-я кн. стихотворений. — Франкфурт-на-Майне: Посев, 1972
- From Mount Nevo, (Frankfurt am Main, 1975) = С горы Нево: 8-я кн. стихотворений. — Франкфурт-на-Майне: Посев, 1975.
- Ariel, (Frankfurt am Main, 1976) = Ариэль: 9-я кн. стихотворений. — Франкфурт-на-Майне: Посев, 1976.
- Three homelands, (Paris, 1987) = Три родины: 10-я кн. стихотворений. — Париж: Альбатрос, 1987.
- Out of the depths cry out, (Holyoke, 1987) = Изъ глубины воззвахъ… 11-й сб. стихотворений. — Холиок: Нью Ингланд Паблишинг К°, 1987.
- The two of us – and one again?, (Holyoke, 1987) = Двое — и снова один? 12-й сб. стихотворений. — Холиок: Нью Ингланд Паблишинг К°, 1987
- Follow-up, (Holyoke, 1988) = Вдогонку: 13-й сб. стихотворений. — Холиок: Нью Ингланд Паблишинг К°, 1988.
- A poem without a subject, (Holyoke, 1989) = Поэма без предмета / Под ред. и с предисл. С. Карлинского. — Холиок: Нью Ингланд Паблишинг К°, 1989.
- A Russian poet visiting China, (The Hague, 1989) = Русский поэт в гостях у Китая: 1920—1952. Сб. стихотворений / Edited and with an Introduction and Notes by Jan Paul Hinrichs. — The Hague: Leuxenhoff Publishing, 1989. (Russian Émigré Literature in the Twentieth Century: Studies and Texts. Vol. 4.)
- Collected Works, (Moscow, 2018– ) = Собрание сочинений: В 3 т. / Сост., подгот. текста, коммент. В.А. Резвого. — М.: Престиж Бук, 2018. (Серия «Золотой Серебряный век»): T. 1. Три родины: Стихотворения и поэмы, T. 2 Кн. 1. Заблудившийся аргонавт: Стихотворения и поэмы, T. 2 Кн. 2. В час последний: Стихотворения и поэмы [T. 3: not yet published].

=== Memoirs ===
- Russian Poetry and Literary Life in Harbin and Shanghai, 1930–1950. The Memoirs of Valerij Perelešin, ed. in Russian and with an Introduction and Notes by Jan Paul Hinrichs (Amsterdam: Rodopi, 1987).
- Russian literary and ecclesiastical life in Manchuria and China from 1920 to 1952 : unpublished memoirs of Valerij Perelešin, ed. by Thomas Hauth (The Hague: Leuxenhoff, 1996).

=== Translations ===
- Samuel Taylor Coleridge, The rhyme of the ancient mariner, (Harbin, 1940) = Кольридж С. Т. Сказание старого моряка / Пер. Валерия Перелешина. — Харбин: Заря, 1940.
- Poems on a fan, (Frankfurt am Main, 1970) = Стихи на веере: Антология китайской классической поэзии. — Франкфурт-на-Майне: Посев, 1970.
- Qu Yuan, Li Sao (Frankfurt am Main, 1975) = Цюй Юань. Ли Сао / Поэма в стихотворном переводе Валерия Перелешина с китайского оригинала. — Франкфурт-на-Майне: Посев, 1975.
- Southern cross. Anthology of Brazilian poetry, (Frankfurt am Main, 1978) = Южный крест: Антология бразильской поэзии. — Франкфурт-на-Майне: Посев, 1978.
- Tao Te Ching, (Moskou, 1994) = Дао дэ цзин / Пер. с кит. Валерия Перелешина. — М.: Фирма «КОНЁК», 1994
- Lao Zi, Tao Te Ching (Moscow, 2000) = Лао-цзы. Дао дэ цзин: Поэма / Пер. с кит. В. Ф. Перелешина; Послесл. Д. Н. Воскресенского. — М.: Время, 2000.

=== Works in Portuguese ===
- Valério Pereliéchin, Nos odres velhos (Rio de Janeiro: Achiamé, 1983)
- Mikhail Kuzmin, Cánticos de Alexandria, translated by Valério Pereliechin &. H. Marques Passos [= Кузмин М. Александрийские песни] (Rio de Janeiro: Anima, 1986).

== Literature ==
- Bakich, Olga. Valerii Pereleshin. Life of a Silkworm (Toronto: University of Toronto Press, 2015)
- Beaudoin, Luc J.. Lost and found voices: four gay male writers in exile [On Valery Pereleshin, Witold Gombrowicz and others] (Montreal: McGill-Queen's University Press, 2022)
- Hinrichs, Jan Paul. Dichter met drie vaderlanden. Valerij Perelešin, brieven en documenten. Catalogus van een tentoonstelling gehouden in de Universiteitsbibliotheek van 6 mei tot 12 juni 1986 (Leiden: Universiteitsbibliotheek, 1986).
- Hinrichs, Jan Paul. Valerij Perelešin (1913–1992). Catalogue of his Papers and Books in Leiden University Library (Leiden: Leiden University Library, 1997).
- Hinrichs, Jan Paul. Senhor Valério (Amsterdam: De Wilde Tomaat, 2016) [=Second revised edition of Senhor Valério (Nijmegen: Flanor, 2011)].
- Li, Meng. Russian émigré literature in China: a missing link (University of Chicago, 2004 [dissertation]).
- Valery Pereleshin Archive in the Manuscript Department IMLI RAN (Moscow, 2020) = Архив Валерия Перелешина в Отделе рукописей ИМЛИ РАН : литераторы русской диаспоры Китая 1930-1940-х годов : по материалам Кабинета архивных фондов эмигрантской литературы им. И.В. Чиннова. – Москва: Издательство ИКАР, 2020
