= Leydse Courant =

Dutch newspaper

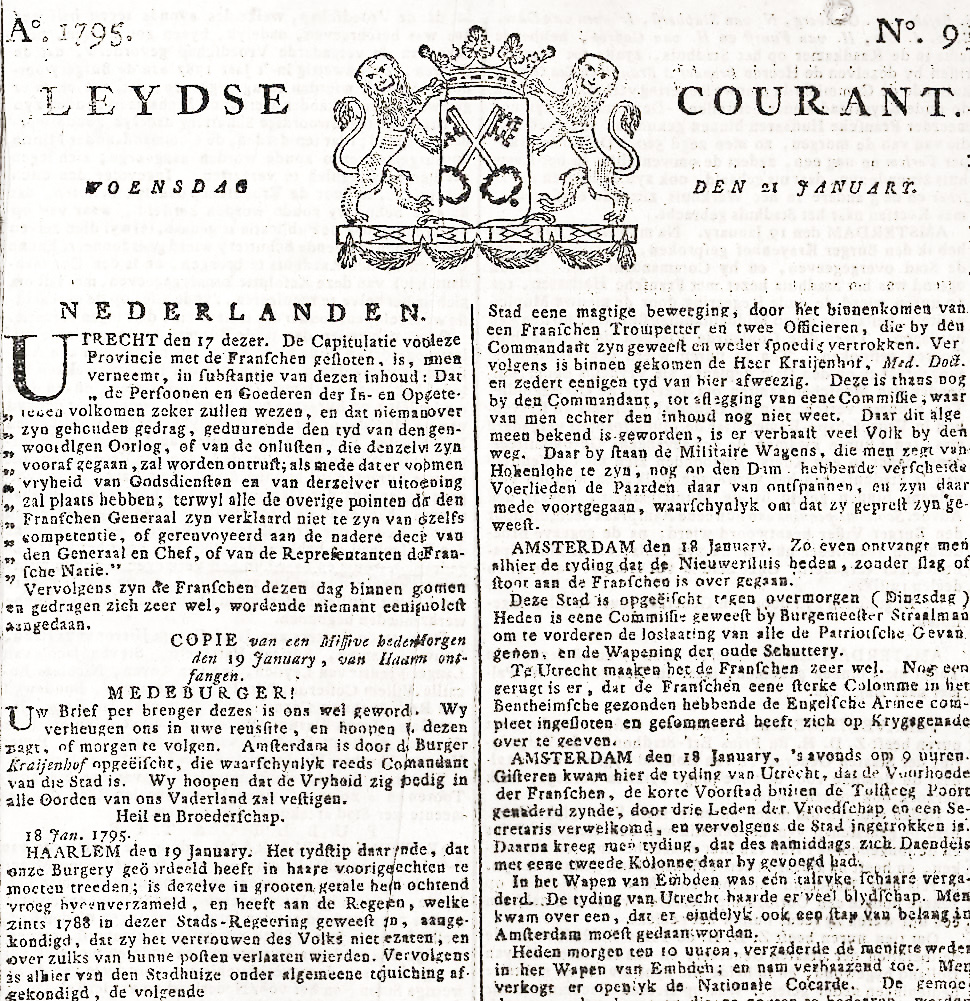
Leydse Courant issue from 1795

The Leydse Courant was a Dutch newspaper published from 1688 through 1992, initially only in Leiden and the region and eventually it covered the entire province of South Holland. This catholic publication was one of the earlier newspapers in the Netherlands.

== History ==
=== 1668–1824: Leydse Courant ===
First publication of the Leydse Courant was in 1688. Until 1870 the newspaper appeared on Monday, Wednesday and Friday. Publisher was Anthony de Klopper & Zoon at the Breede Straat in Leiden.

=== 1824–1870: Leydsche Courant ===
The cost of the newspaper in 1845 was 12 Dutch Guilder a year or 10 Guilder cents for an individual copy. Ads were 25 cents per line when commercial and 10 cents per line when noncommercial.

=== 1870–1947: Leidsche Courant ===
In 1870, publication became a daily. At the start of the 20th century, the editorial office moved to Oude Singel 54.

In 1909, a subscription was 9 Guilder cents per week, 1.30 Guilder per 3 months, and one paid 20 Guilder to have the newspaper sent by mail. Single copies were 2.5 cents. Starting in 1910, an illustrated Sunday paper appeared for 5 cents. On 1 October 1914, the newspaper moved to Steenschuur 15, and the subscription cost was raised to 10 cents per week. The newspaper remained in this building during the Second World War.

The newspaper was notified by the Roman Catholic Church about individuals who were about to get married. These young married couples received a free trial subscription that was then often renewed for pay.

=== 1947–1992: Leidse Courant ===
At the end of 1971, mail subscriptions were dropped. In June 1972, the cost of an individual copy was 35 cents, a weekly subscription was 1.83 Guilder, while for an annual subscription, one paid 91.55. Prices rose fast. In January 1974, the price for individual copies was raised to 40 cents, in June 1974 to 45 cents, in January 1975 to 50 cents, and in June 1976 to 55 cents.

When the newspaper folded in 1992, it had 14,000 subscriptions.
