= Curfew pass =

Document authorizing travel otherwise restricted

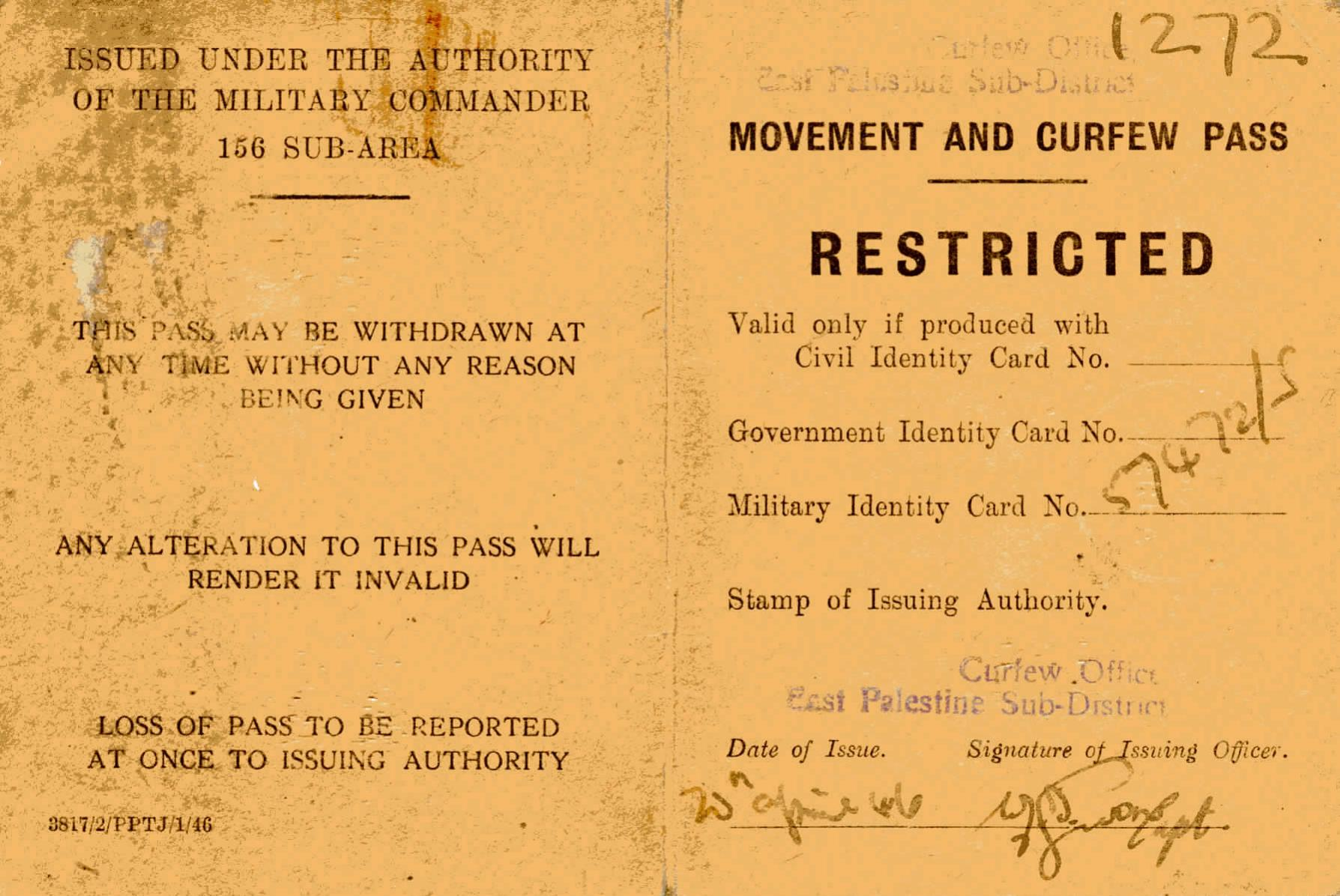
Movement and curfew pass, issued under the authority of the British Military Commander, East Palestine, 1946

A curfew pass or a movement and curfew pass is a document which authorizes public officials or civilians to travel within – or to and from – an area under an imposed curfew.

== Trivia ==
The A 38 pass from the animated film Asterix Conquers Rome, a satire on bureaucracy, is now used to describe it.

In March 2020, there was a partial curfew in France due to the COVID-19 pandemic, and it was compulsory to carry a self-completed Attestation de déplacement dérogatoire form with you in public, stating a valid reason (including work, shopping or sport) for leaving the house. This certificate was also referred to as a "pass" in the German-speaking media.
