= Don Aminado =

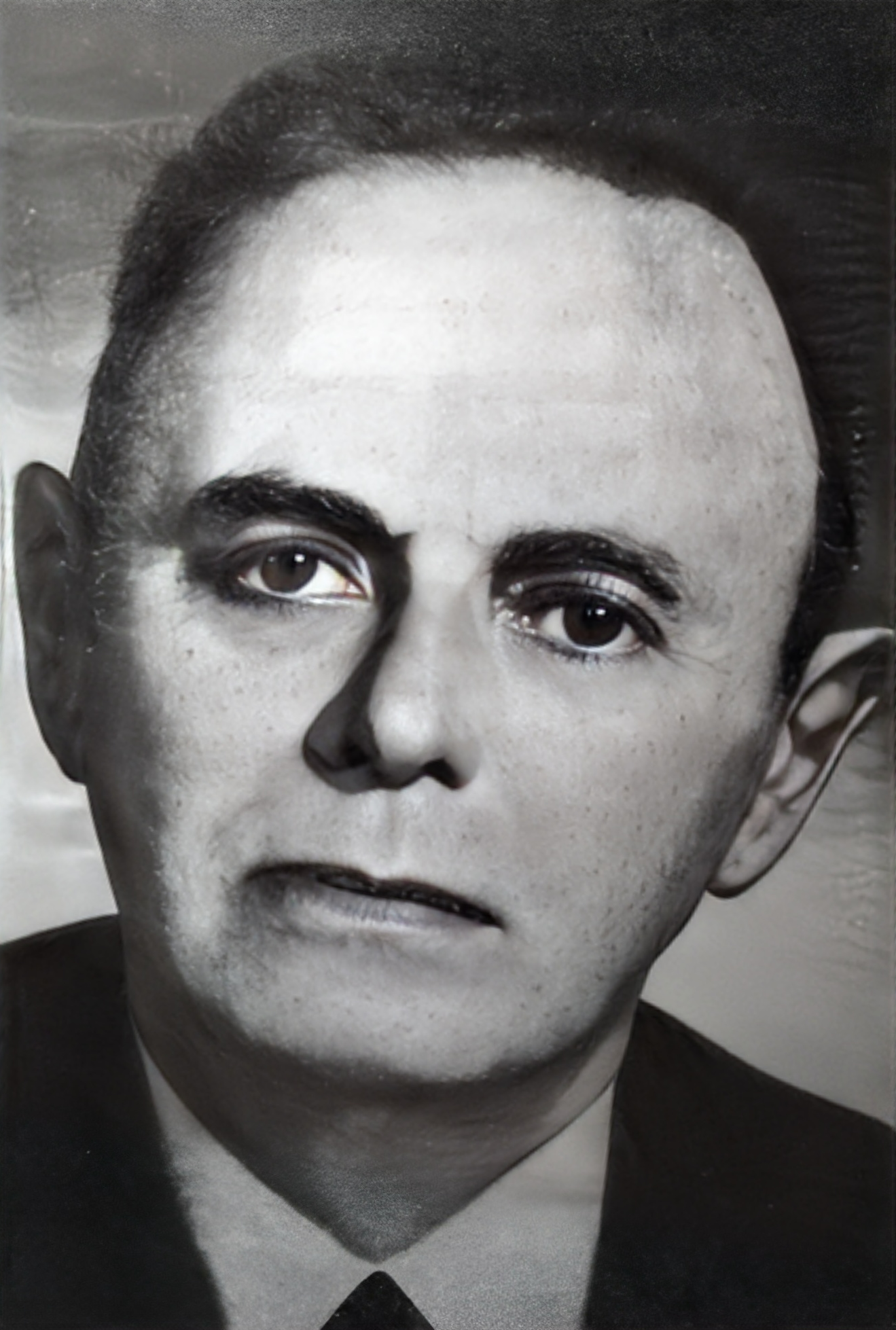
Don Aminado

Don Aminado (1888–1957) was a Russian emigre writer. He was born Aminodav Shpolyansky into a Jewish family in Elizavetgrad in the Kherson Governorate of the old Russian empire. He studied law in Odessa and Kiev, and showed literary promise during his student years. In the decade of the 1910s, he published in various outlets such as Rannee Utro, Novy Satirikon and Krasnyi Smekh, dropping his Jewish name in favour of the pen name Don Aminado.

He was wounded in World War I and discharged out of the army. He lived through the October Revolution and later joined the wave of emigres that escaped the country in the wake of the Russian Civil War. In 1920, he sailed from Odessa to Constantinople, and then made his way to Paris. In Paris, he contributed to Poslednie Novosti, the principal emigre literary journal, until its closure in 1940. A writer of satirical stories and poetry, he published very little after WW2.

He died in 1957.

Considered one of the leading emigre satirists alongside Teffi and Sasha Chorny, he won the Legion d'Honneur in 1934. His work has been revived in post-communist times, being anthologized in various collections of emigre literature and Russian Jewish literature.
