= C. C. Uhlenbeck =

Dutch linguist and anthropologist (1866–1951)

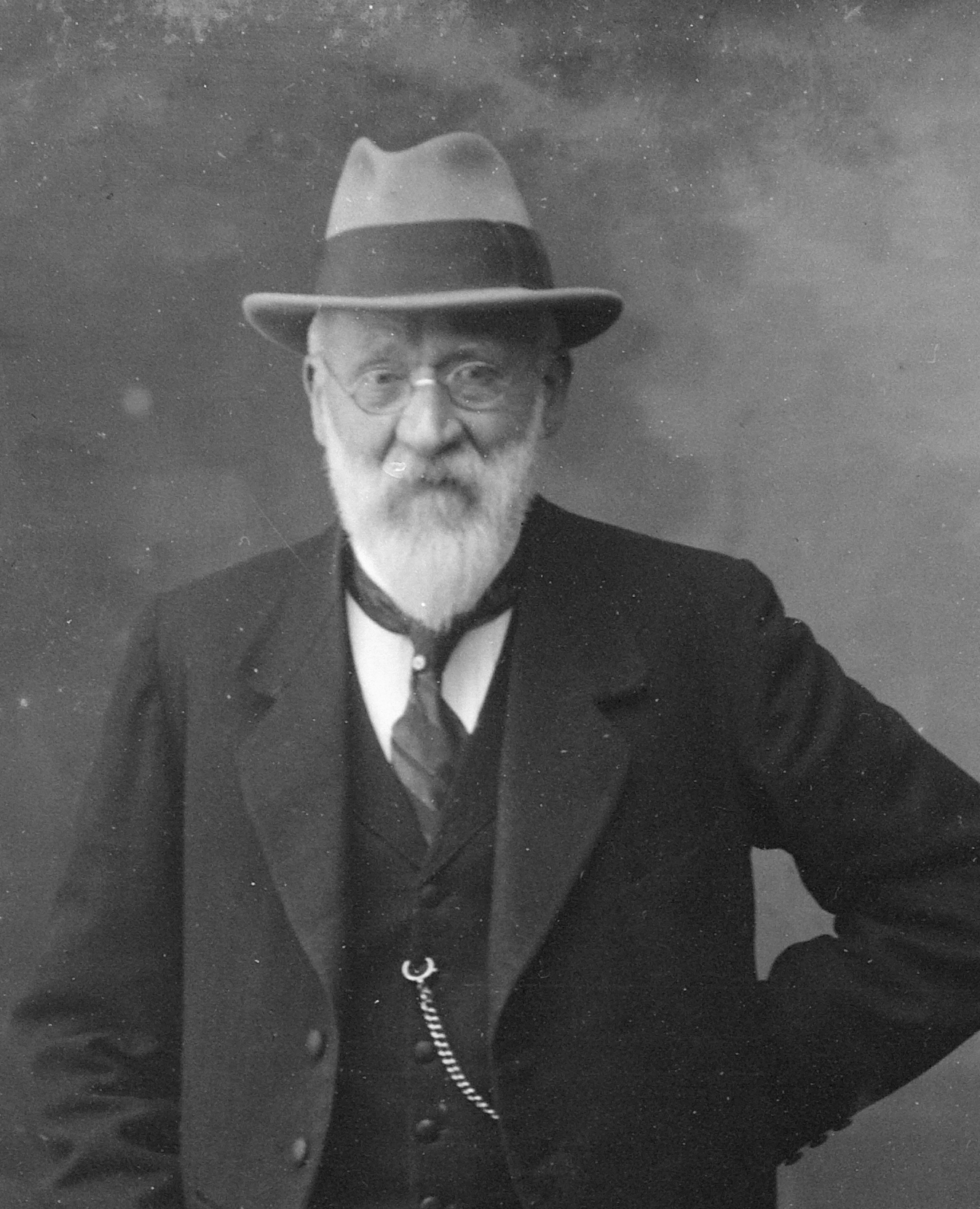
- Born: 18 October 1866; Voorburg, Netherlands
- Died: 12 August 1951 (aged 84); Lugano, Switzerland
- Spouse: Wilhelmina Maria Melchior (m. 1891)

Academic background
- Education: Leiden University
- Thesis: De verwantschapsbetrekkingen tussen de Germaansche en Baltoslavische talen ('Correspondences between the Germanic and Balto-Slavic languages', 1888)
- Doctoral advisor: Hendrik Kern

Academic work
- Institutions: Leiden University
- Notable students: Nicolaas van Wijk

Christianus Cornelius Uhlenbeck (18 October 1866 – 12 August 1951) was a Dutch linguist and anthropologist with a wide variety of research interests. His published work included books and articles on Germanic and Balto-Slavic languages, Sanskrit, Basque, and the Blackfoot language of North American Indians. He served as a lecturer at Leiden University.

== Biography ==
Christianus Cornelius Uhlenbeck was born in Voorburg, Netherlands, on 18 October 1866, the son of an ethnic German couple, Julie (née le Roux) and Peter Frederik Uhlenbeck, a Dutch naval officer. Following Peter's retirement from the navy in 1861, the family moved to Voorburg where Peter was the burgemeester. Shortly after Christianus's birth, the family moved to Haarlem. The last name was originally in der Eulenbeck, signifying the family's previous ownership of property near Velbert in modern-day Germany some generations back. On 23 July 1891, Uhlenbeck married Wilhelmina Maria (née Melchior), who later was his partner in his anthropological work.

In 1904 Uhlenbeck became member of the Royal Netherlands Academy of Arts and Sciences.

In the summer of 1911, Uhlenbeck visited the Blackfoot Indian reservation in Montana to conduct field work. He was accompanied by his wife, whose diary was later incorporated into their book about this expedition.

== Selected works ==
- Uhlenbeck, C. C. A Concise Blackfoot Grammar Based on Material from the Southern Peigans, New York: AMS, 1978. (Originally published 1938 by Hollandsche Uitgevers-Maatschappij, Amsterdam, in series Verhandelingen der Koninklijke Akademie van Wetenschappen te Amsterdam, Afdeeling Letterkunde. Nieuwe Reeks, Deel XLI) OCLC: 3097417
- Uhlenbeck, C. C. An English–Blackfoot Vocabulary, New York: AMS, 1979. (Originally published 1930 in series: Verhandelingen der Koninklijke Akademie van Wetenschappen te Amsterdam, Afd. Letterkunde, Nieuwe Reeks, Deel 29, No. 4) ISBN 0-404-15796-3
- Uhlenbeck, C. C. and R. H. van Gulik. A Blackfoot-English Vocabulary Based on Material from the Southern Peigans, Amsterdam: Uitgave van de N.V. Noord-Hollandsche Uitgevers-Jaatschapp-ij, 1934. (Verhandelingen der Koninklijke Akademie Van WetenSchappen te Amsterdam. Afdeeling Letterkunde, Nieuwe Reeks, Deel XXXIII, No. 2)
- Uhlenbeck-Melchior, Wilhelmina Maria (2005). Montana 1911: a professor and his wife among the Blackfeet: Wilhelmina Maria Uhlenbeck-Melchior's diary and C. C. Uhlenbeck's original Blackfoot texts and a new series of Blackfoot texts (2005 ed.). Calgary: University of Calgary Press. ISBN 9780803218284.
