= Corrie Pabst =

Dutch artist

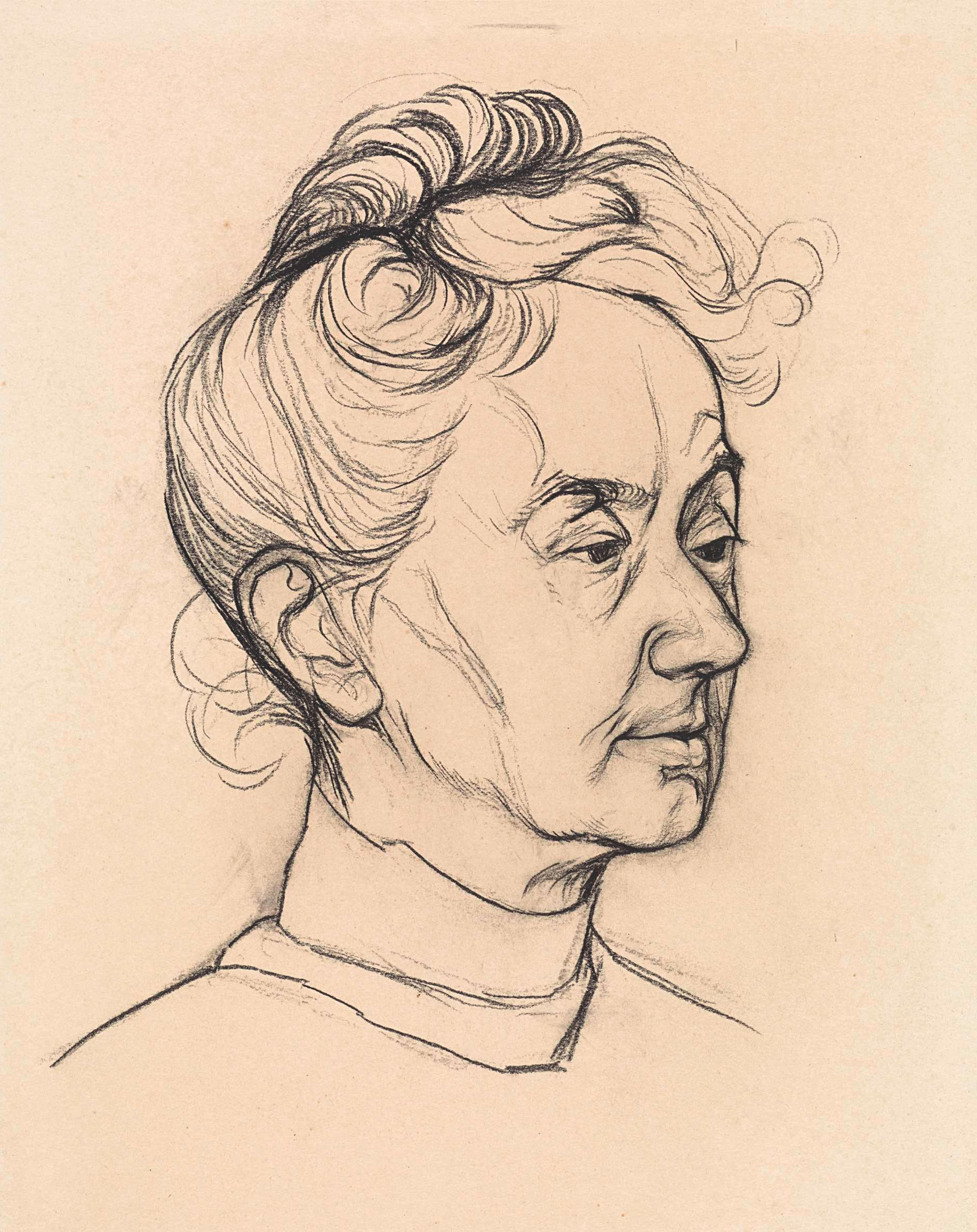
- Portrait of Corrie Pabst by Julie de Graag
- Born: 12 November 1865; Woerden, Netherlands
- Died: 21 November 1943 (aged 78); Laren, North Holland, Netherlands
- Other names: Cornelia Johanna Pabst
- Known for: Painting

Cornelia "Corrie" Johanna Pabst (1865–1943) was a Dutch artist.

== Biography ==
Pabst was born on 12 November 1865 in Woerden. She studied at the Akademie van beeldende kunsten (Den Haag) (Royal Academy of Art, The Hague). She was a student of Henk Bremmer. Her work was included in the 1939 exhibition and sale Onze Kunst van Heden (Our Art of Today) at the Rijksmuseum in Amsterdam.

Pabst died on 21 November 1943 in Laren, North Holland. Her work is in the Centraal Museum in Utrecht, the Kröller-Müller Museum, and the Rijksmuseum. In 2022 Pabst has (till 19 February) an exhibition in Het Brinkhuis, Laren.

== Gallery ==
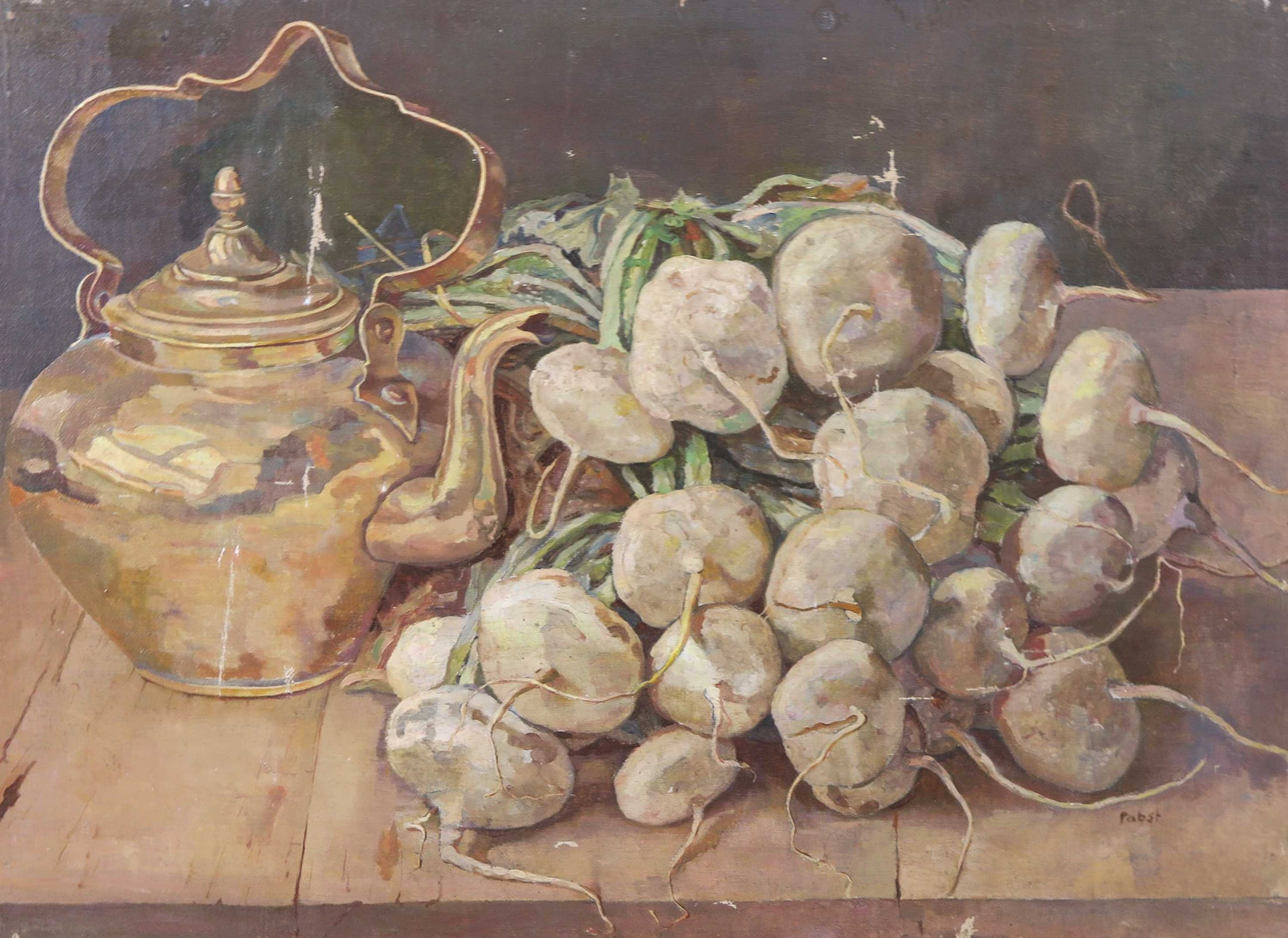
Still life with cauldron and tubers

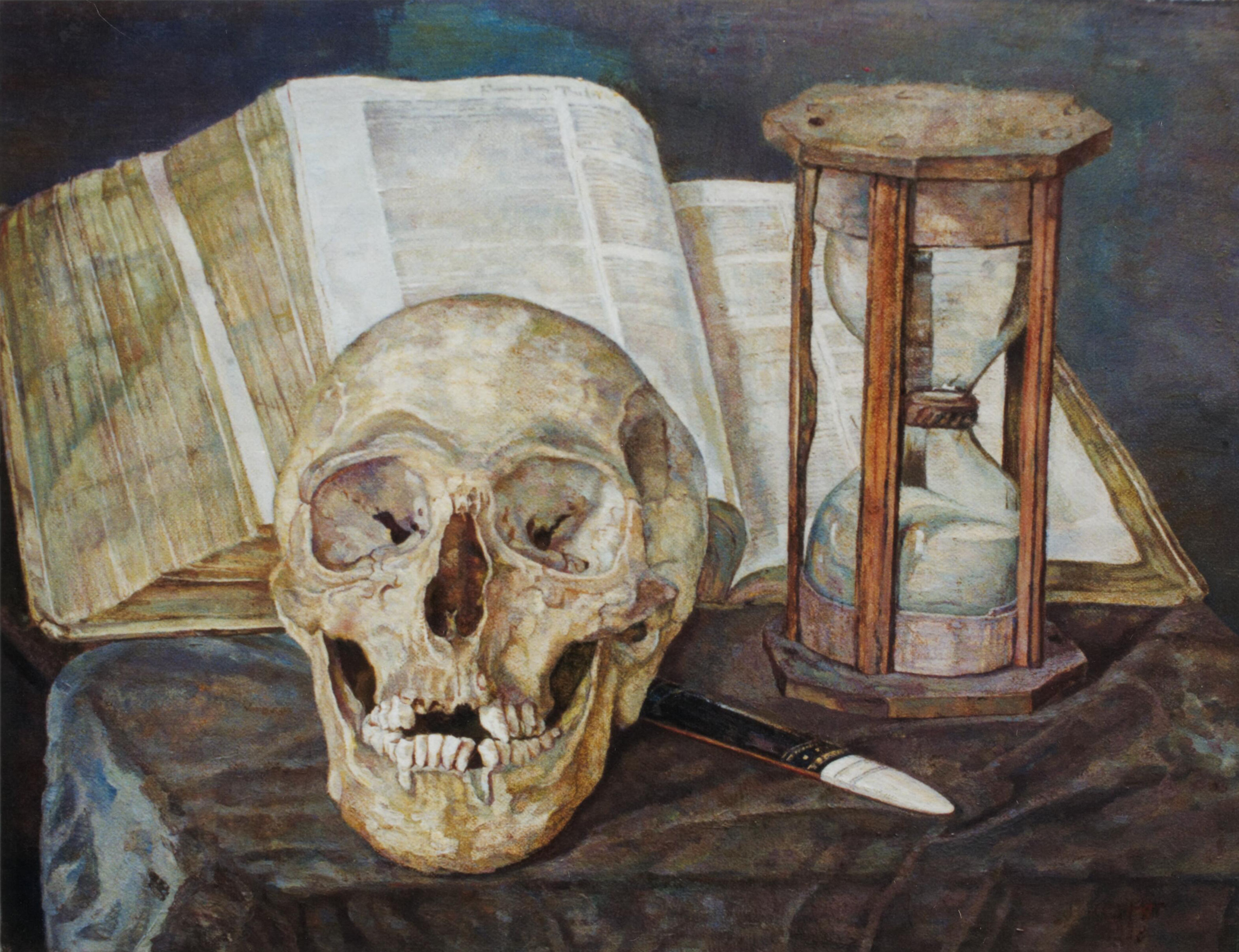
Vanitas, 1908

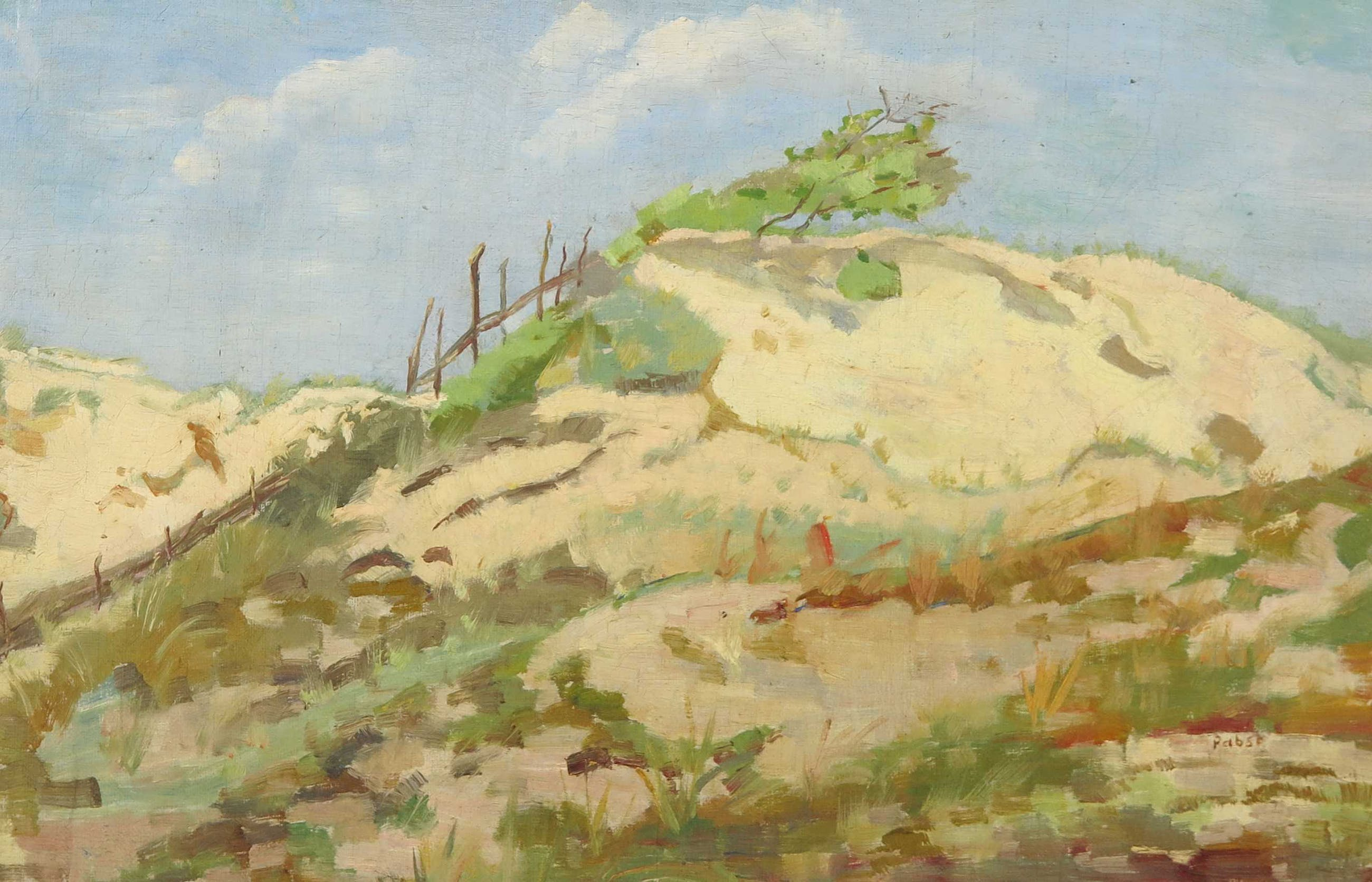
Dune landscape
