= Julie de Graag =

Dutch artist

Anna Julia "Julie" de Graag
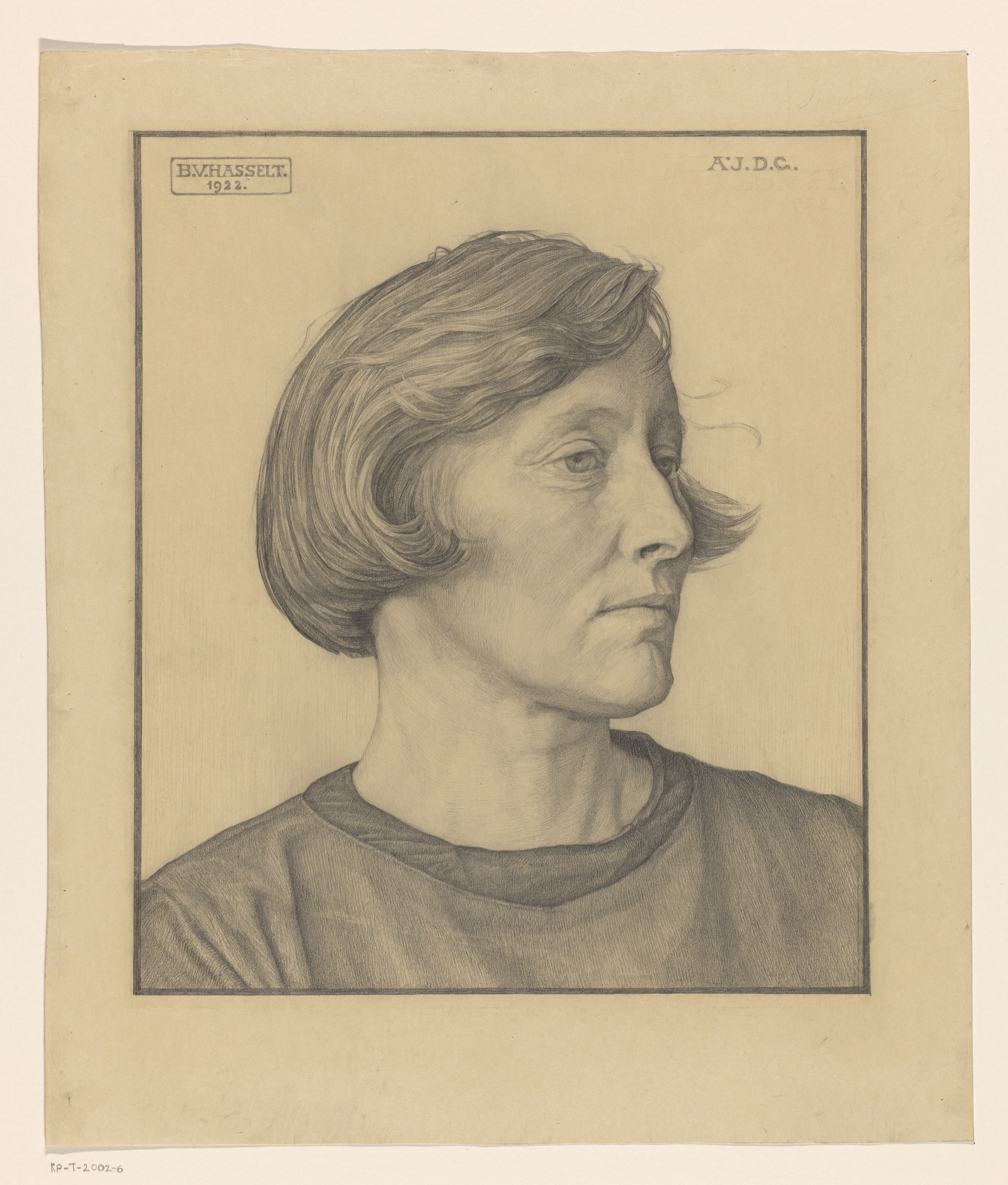
- Portrait of Julie de Graag by Bertha van Hasselt
- Born: 18 July 1877; Gorinchem
- Died: 2 February 1924 (aged 46); The Hague
- Education: Royal Academy of Fine Arts, The Hague
- Known for: Woodcuts, drawing
- Style: Art Nouveau

Anna Julia "Julie" de Graag, was born at Gorinchem on 18 July 1877 and died at The Hague on 2 February 1924. She was a Dutch watercolourist, printmaker, and painter.

== Biography ==
=== Family ===
Born in Gorinchem, Julie de Graag was the fourth of six children. After her third birthday, their parents, Johannes de Graag (1839–1916) and Karoline Stephana Couwenberg (1850–1935), moved to Bois-le-Duc.

As a child, she was identified as having a fragile health, and received special attention. Her mother, who was a talented amateur painter, passed on to her daughter her passion for manual work and drawing.

In the 1890s, the family moved to The Hague.

=== Education ===
Julie de Graag quickly entered the Royal Academy of Fine Arts in The Hague, in a class made up solely of women. In particular, she received training from Johannes Josephus Aarts, and the art critic Henk Bremmer, with whom she studied perspective. Henk Bremmer also advised Julie de Graag to focus on woodcuts in colour. Julie de Graag then established herself as an independent artist and developed multiple skills in woodcut, embroidery, and painting.

=== Career ===
In 1904, Julie de Graag moved to Laren, in North Holland. She befriended the sculptor Joseph Mendes da Costa and his wife, as well as the painter Bart van der Leck. Together, they collaborated to develop and art that draw on more stylized shapes.

On 1 January 1908, a fire ravaged the farm where she had established her workshop, resulting in the destruction of a large number of her works.

Alongside her work as a professional artist, Julie de Graag also taught drawing at the Utrecht School for Girls.

=== Death ===
On 2 February 1924, while living in The Hague, Julie de Graag committed suicide. She suffered from depression, and continually doubted her artistic abilities.

== Oeuvre ==
Julie de Graag worked on floral themes, studies of animals, portraits, and view of villages. Her work was considered part of the Art Nouveau movement, but stood between that style and De Stijl. Her work was refined and considered. A significant portion of her portfolio comprises graphite renderings and watercolor illustrations.

In her woodcuts, she used the end grain of the wood. Because of the hardness of end grain wood, it is more difficult to work than longitudinal wood, but produces much finer printings.

Relief prints using the end grain are called wood engravings, whereas those using longitudinal wood are called woodcuts.

Julie de Graag's work has been described as powerful, and as showing a technical mastery, making use of strong contrasting colours, and the omission of details. While de Graag's works often incorporate elements of abstraction, she did not do as far as other contemporary artists such as Bart van der Leck and Piet Mondriaan. It has been commented that de Graag's portraits and animals share a stylistic similarity to those of the sculptor Joseph Mendes de Costa.

Her works are included in the collections of the Centraal Museum d'Utrecht, the Kröller-Müller Museum, the Museum of Modern Art Arnhem, the Boijmans Van Beunigen museum, the Rijksmuseum Amsterdam, the Teylers Museum, the Drents Museums, and the Art Museum of The Hague.

From 16 September 2017 to 5 May 2019, the Drents Museum held the exhibition "Uit fijn hout gesneden" ("Cut from fine wood") which featured 14 works by Julie de Graag.

== Gallery ==
=== Portraits ===
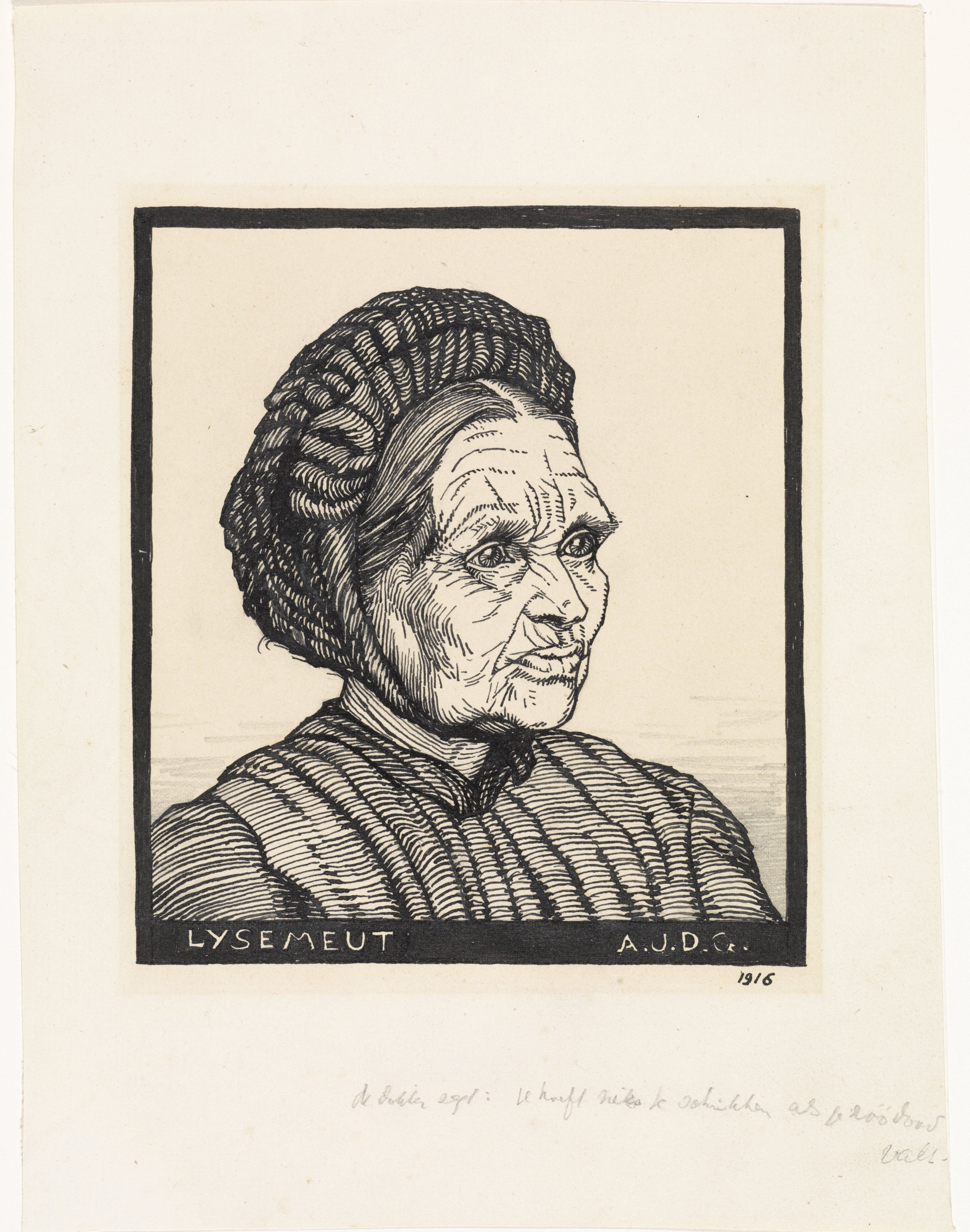
Portrait of a Laren peasant woman named Lysemeut (1916)

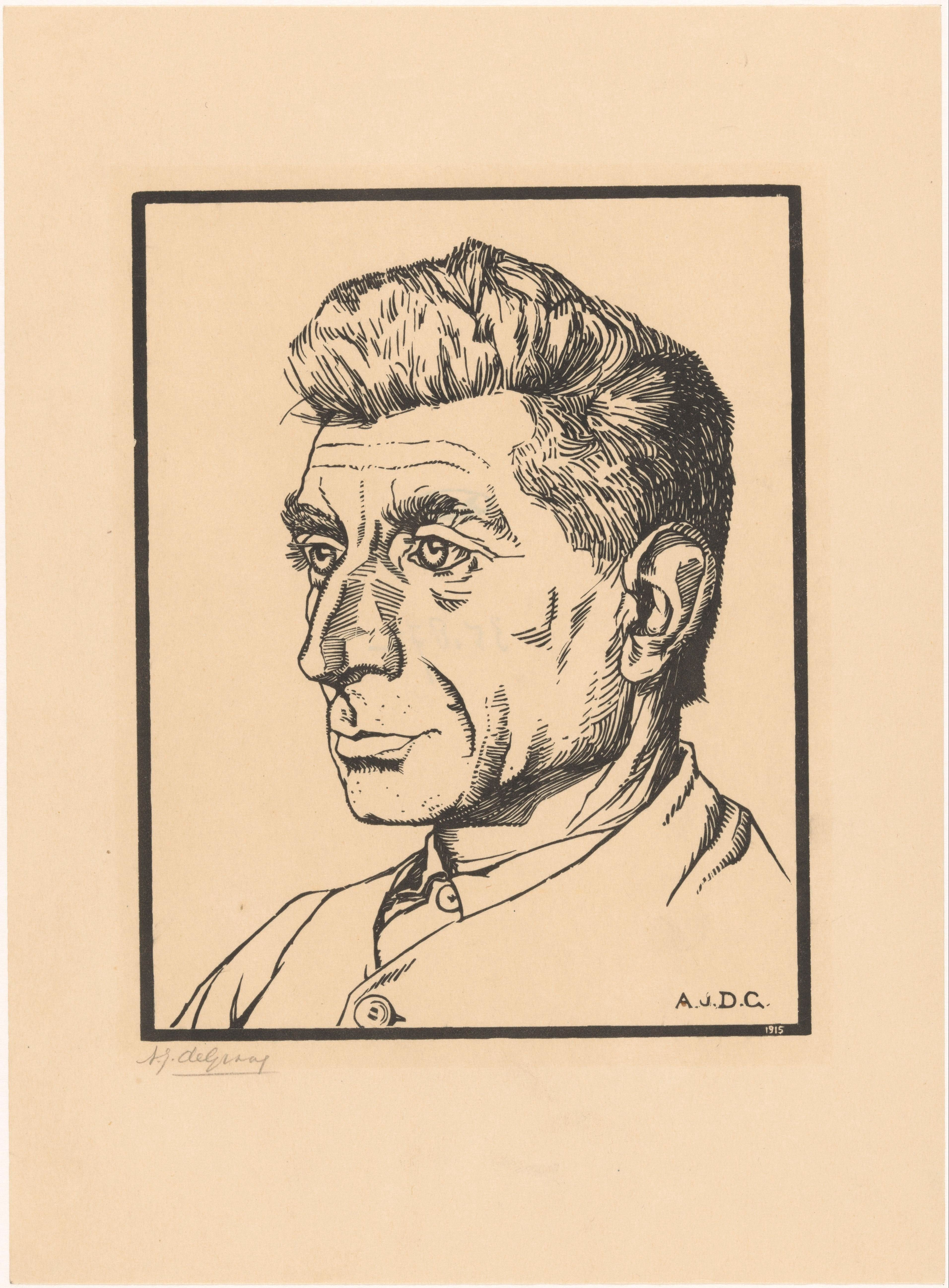
Portrait of an unknown man (1915)

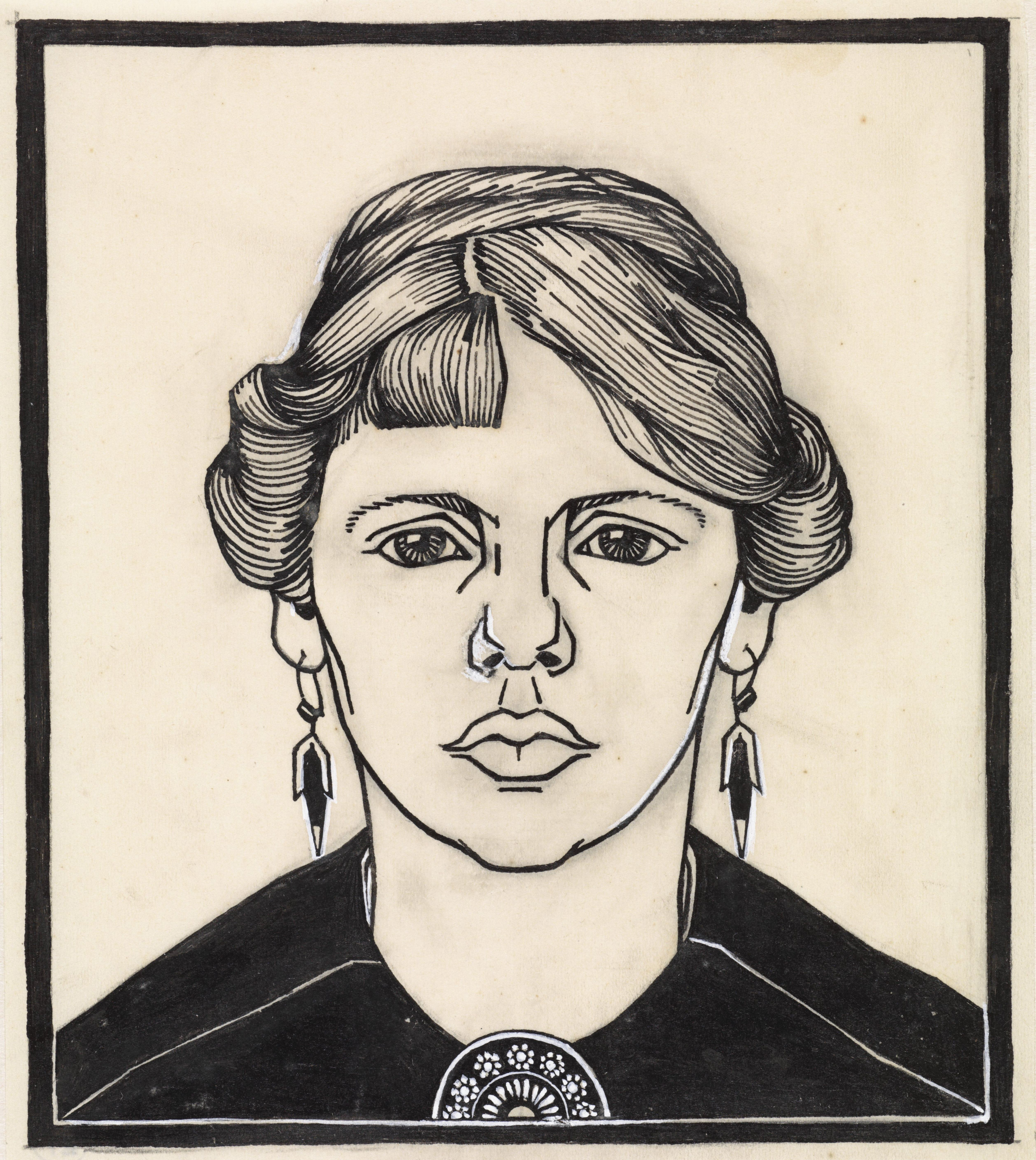
Portrait of a woman from the front

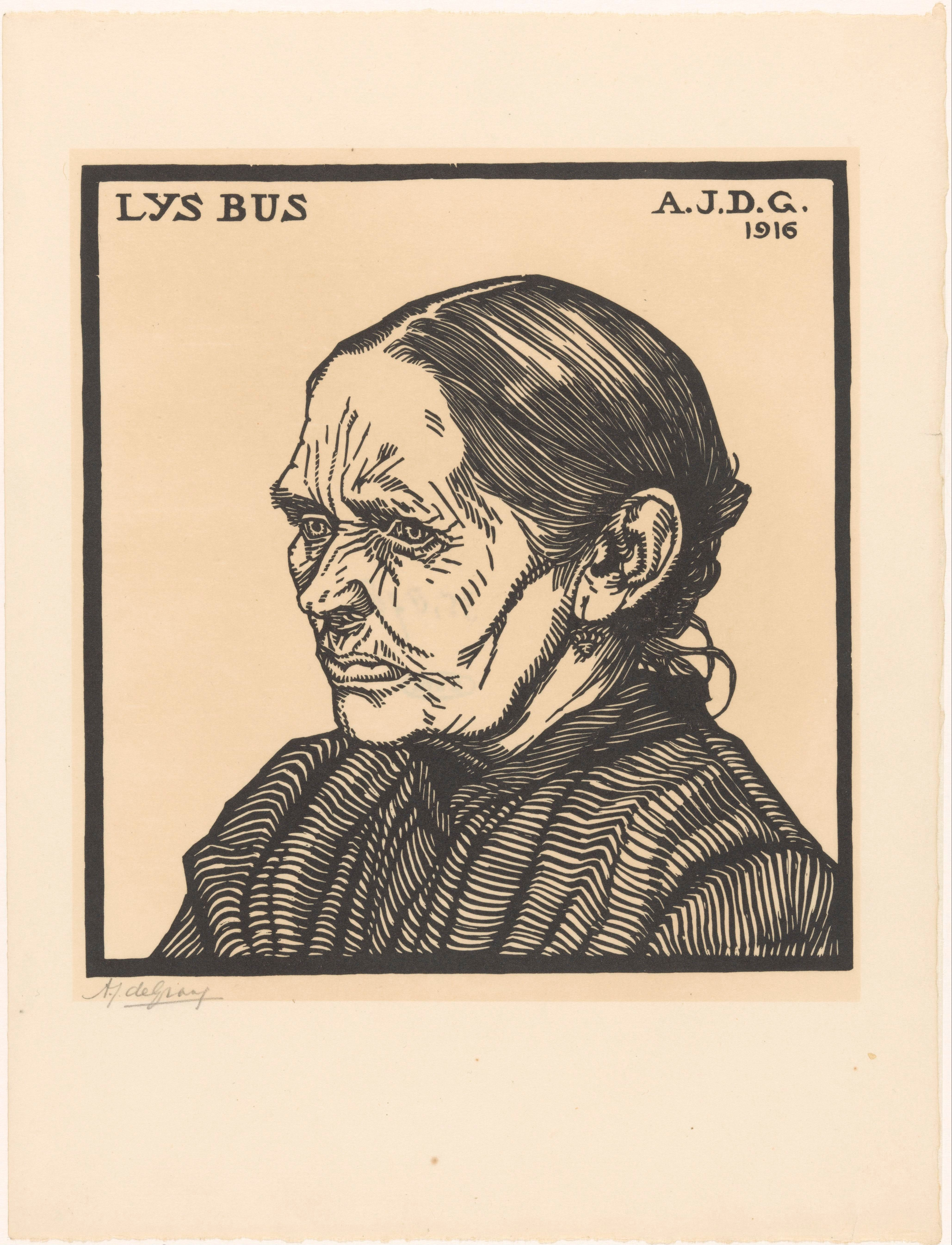
Portrait of Lijs Bus (1916)

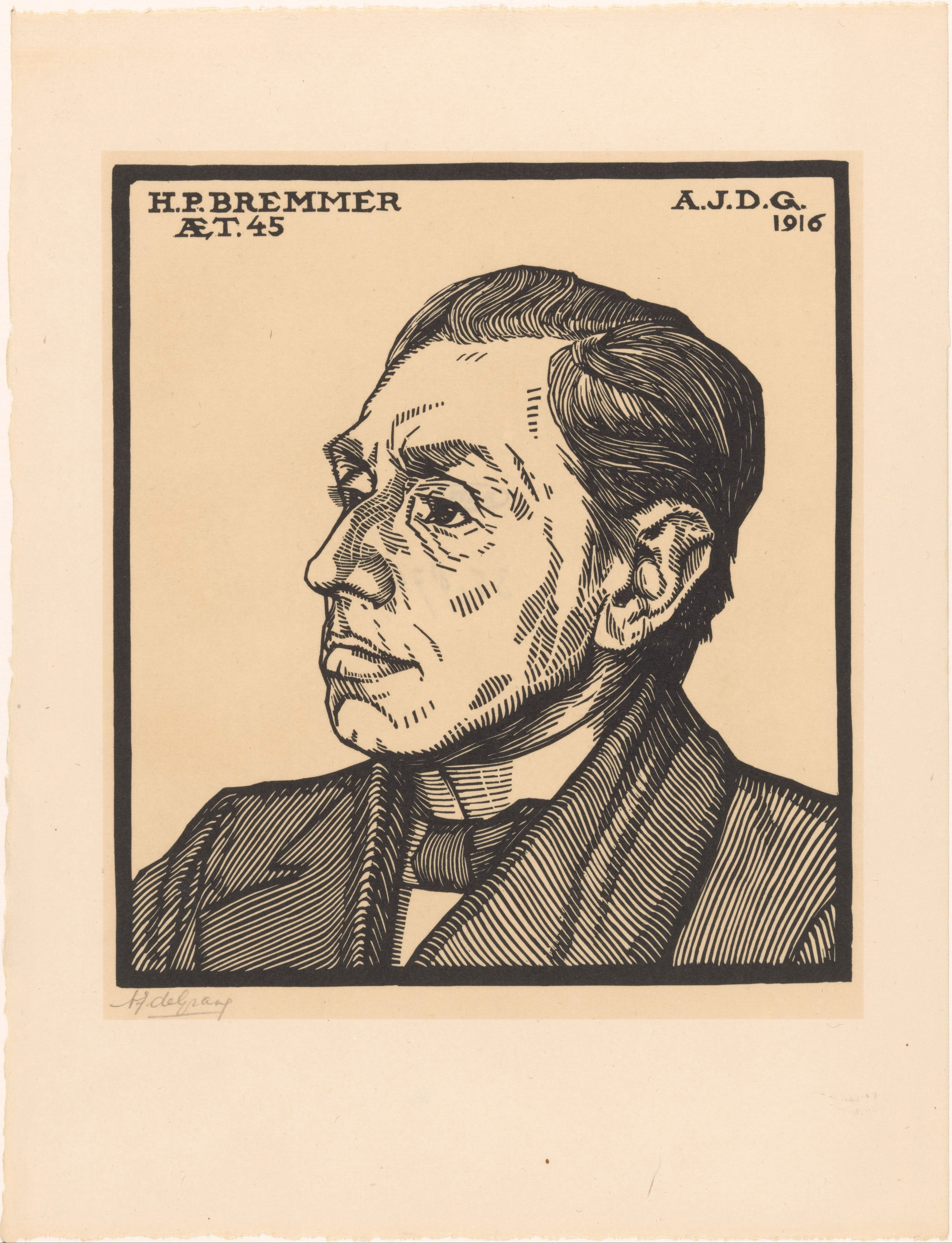
Portrait of Hendricus Petrus Bremmer (1916)

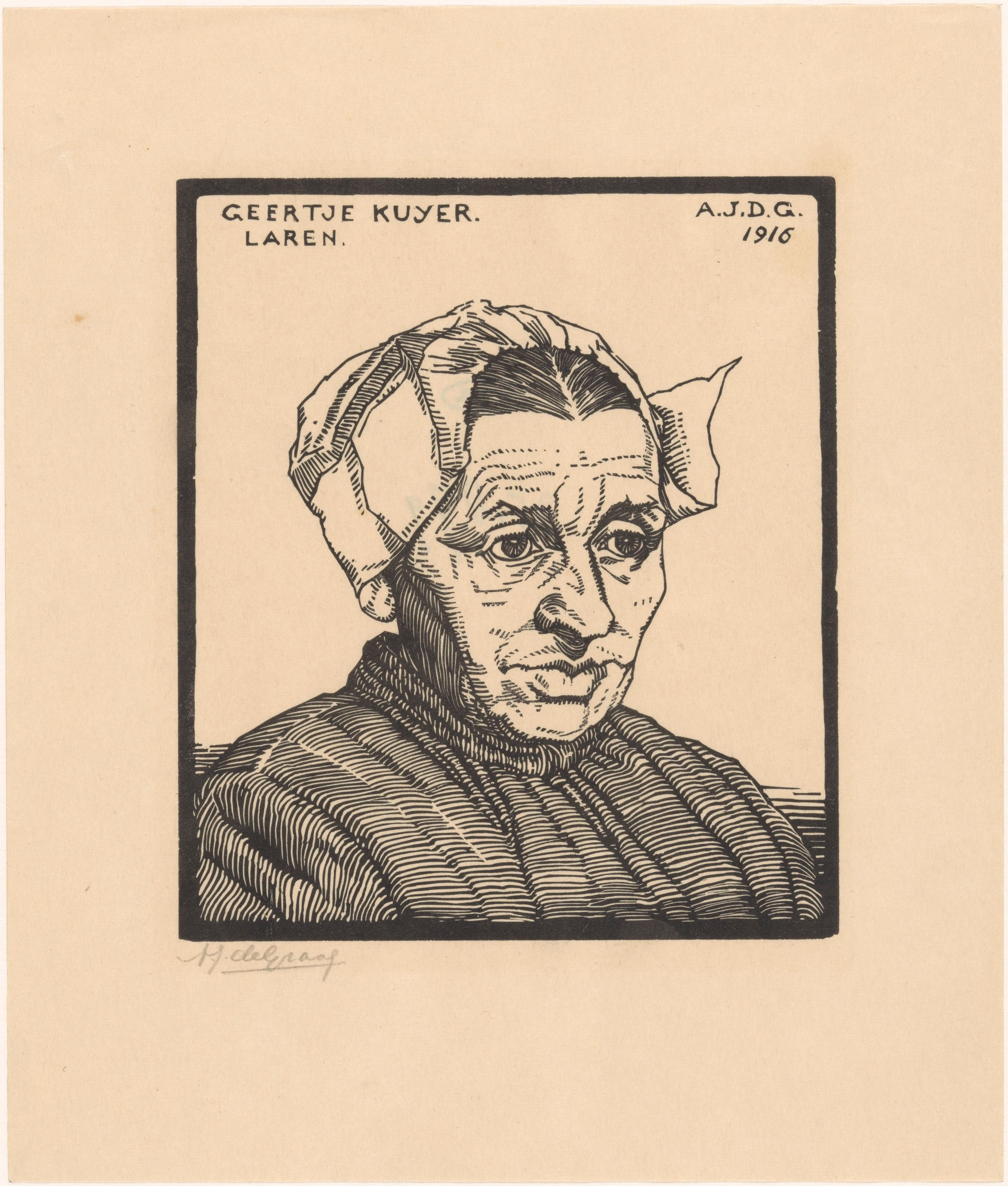
Portrait of Geertje Kuijer (1916)

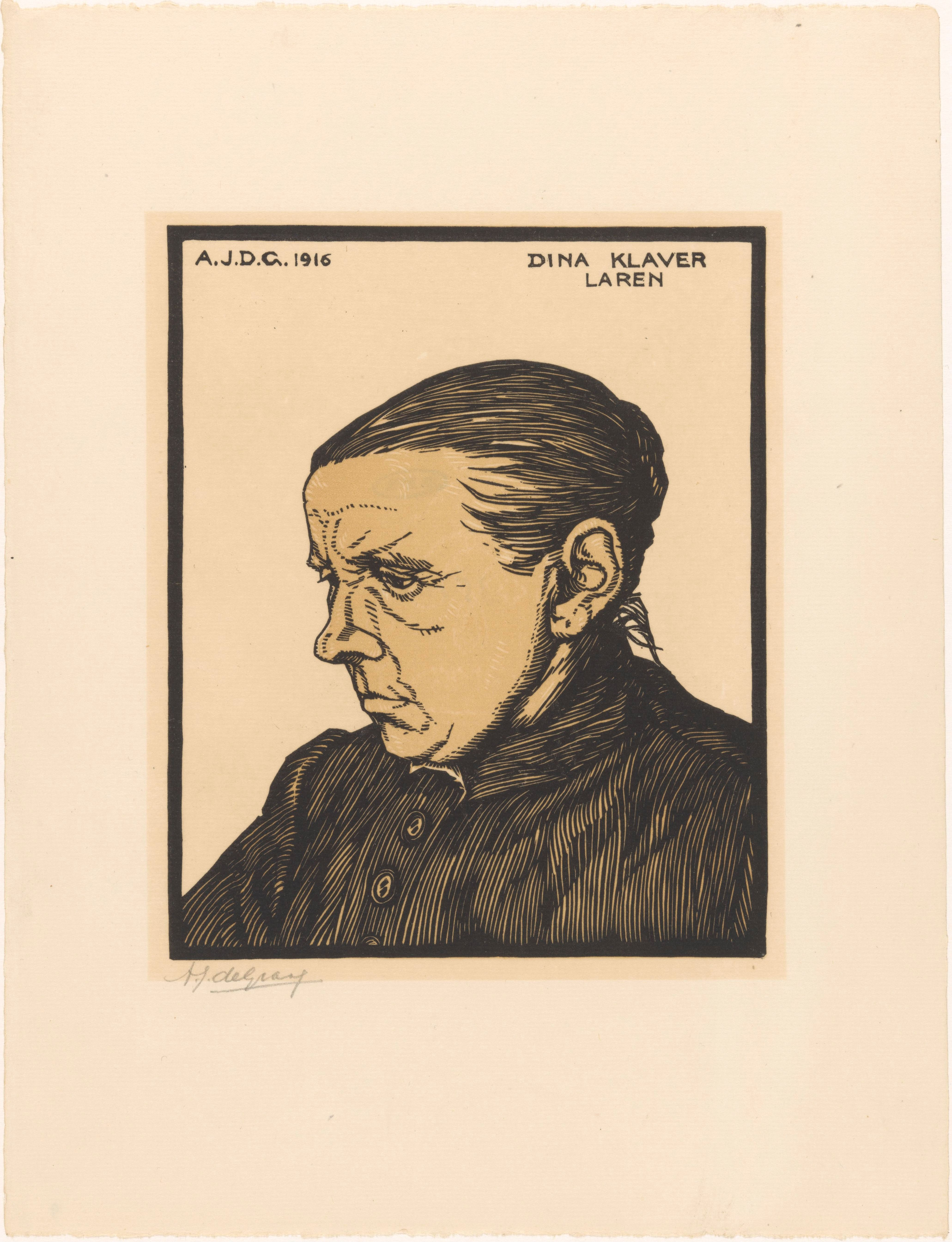
Portrait of Dina Klaver (1916)

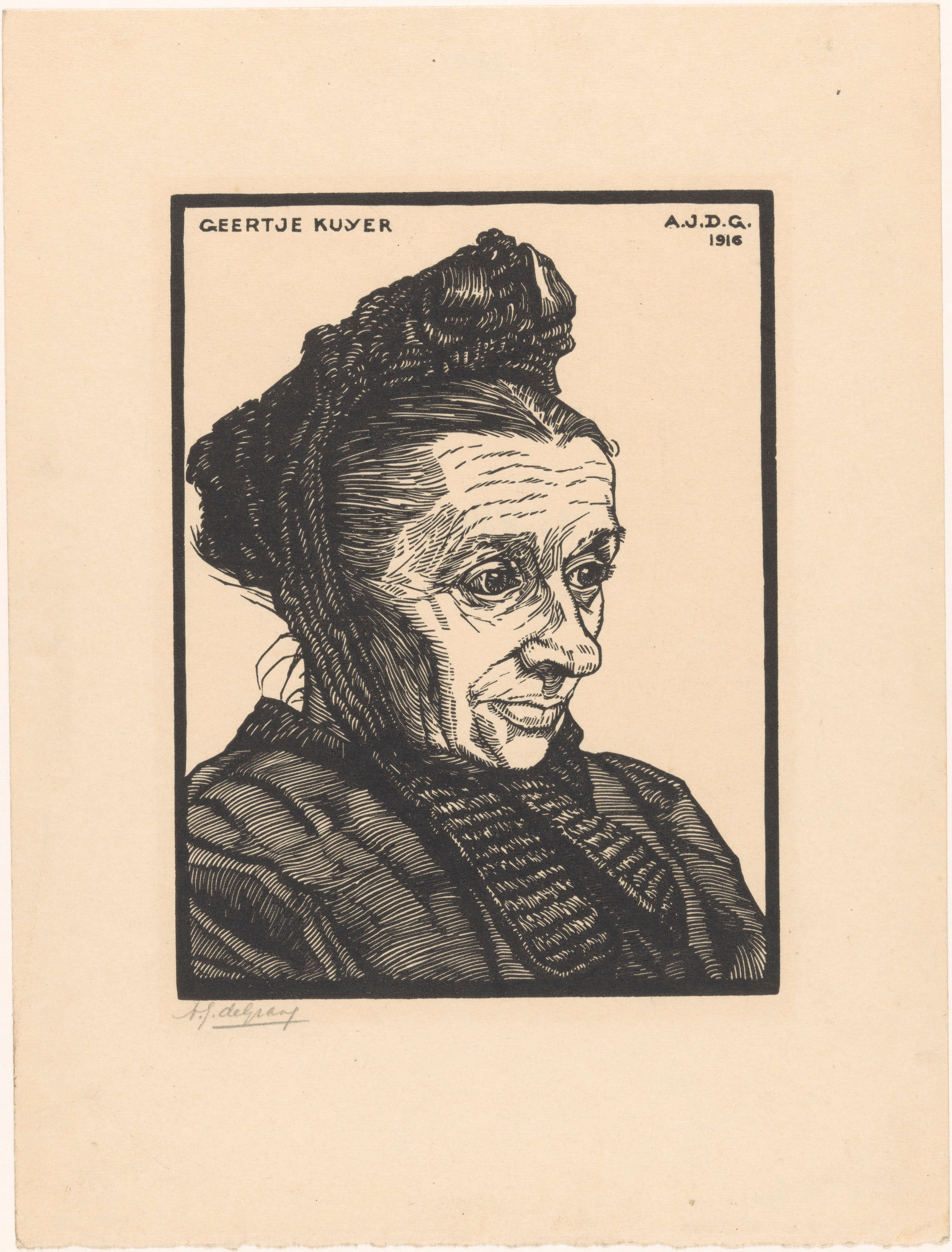
Portrait of Geertje Kuijer (1916)

=== Animals ===
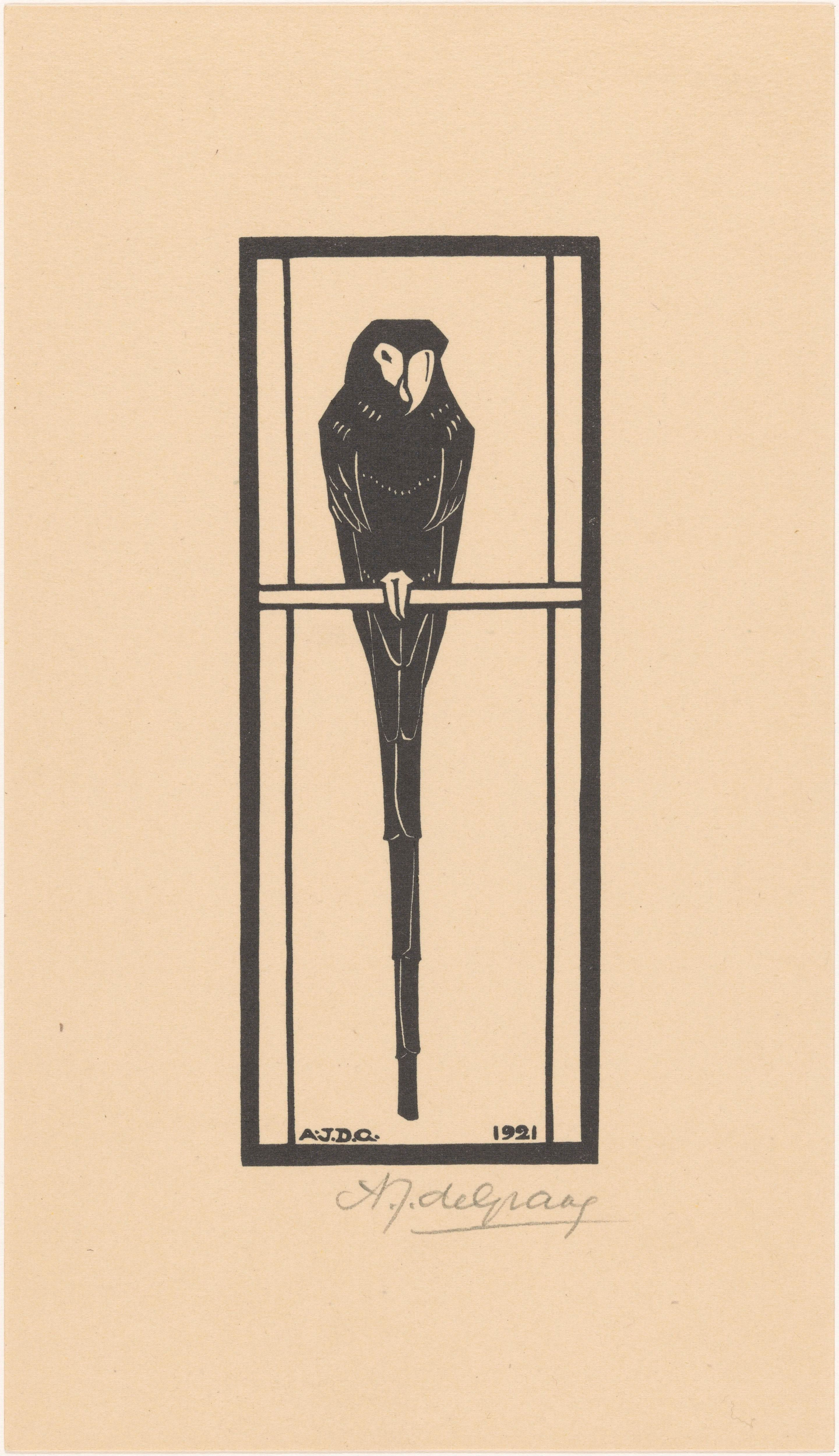
Macaw

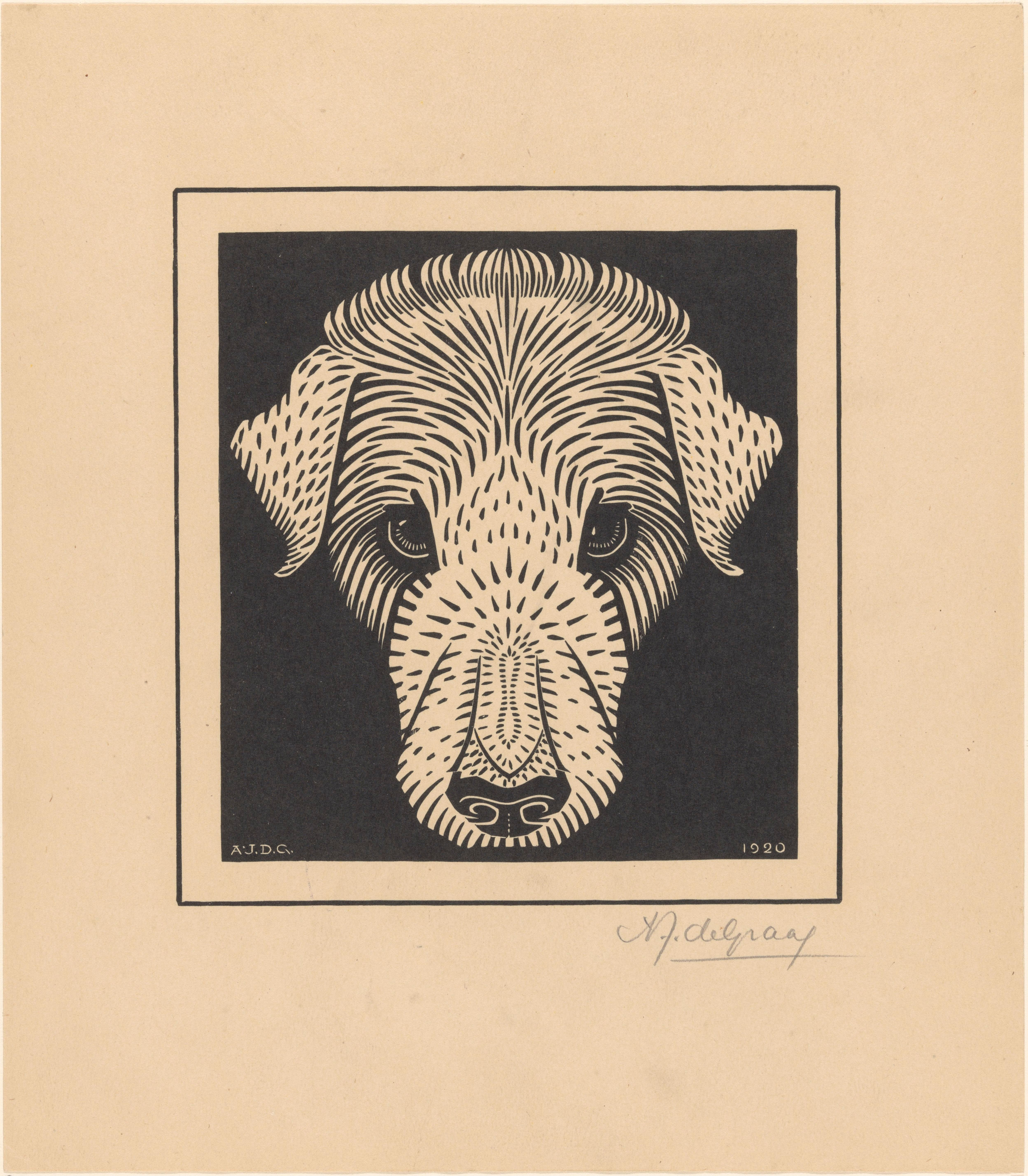
Dog's head

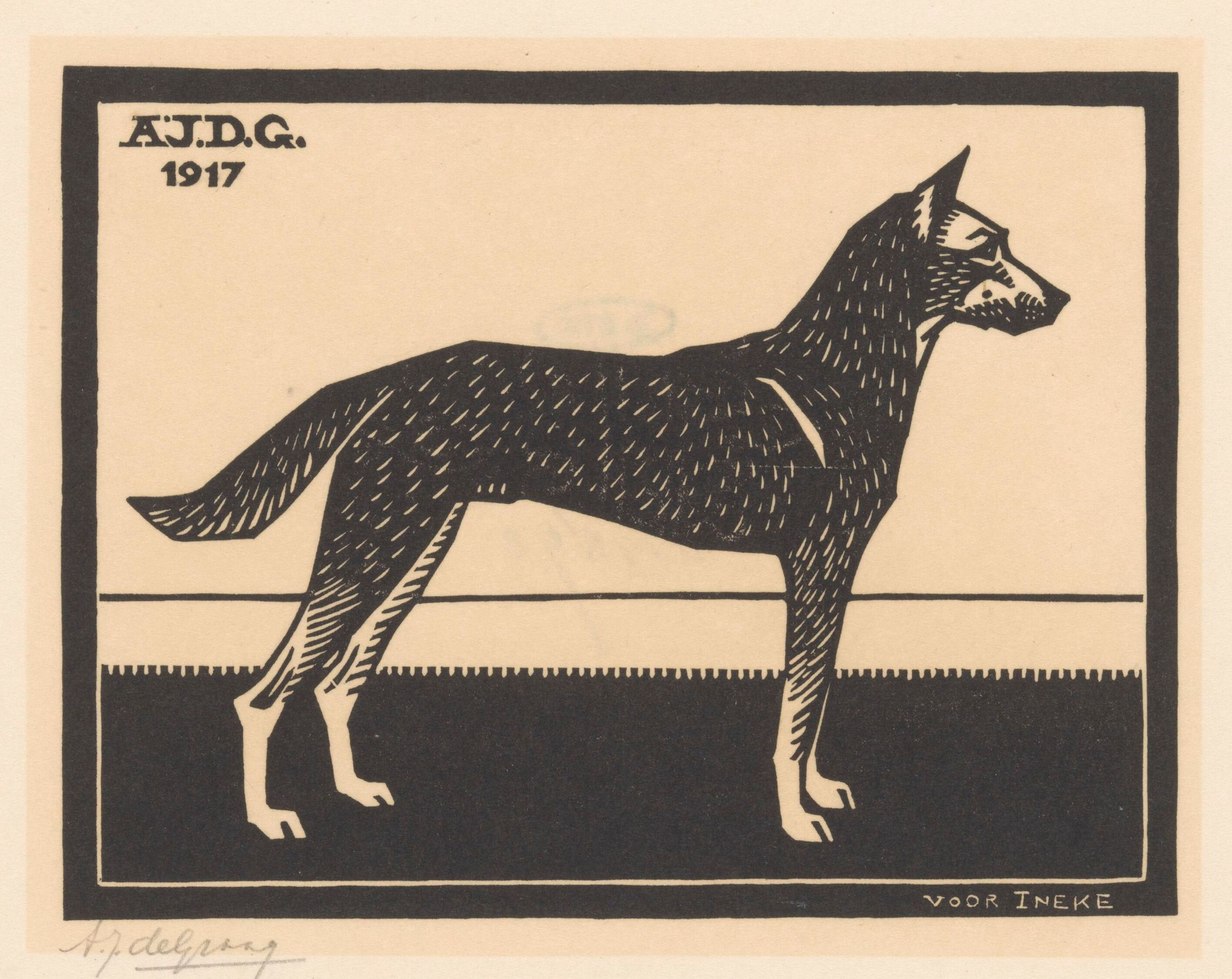
Dog (1917)

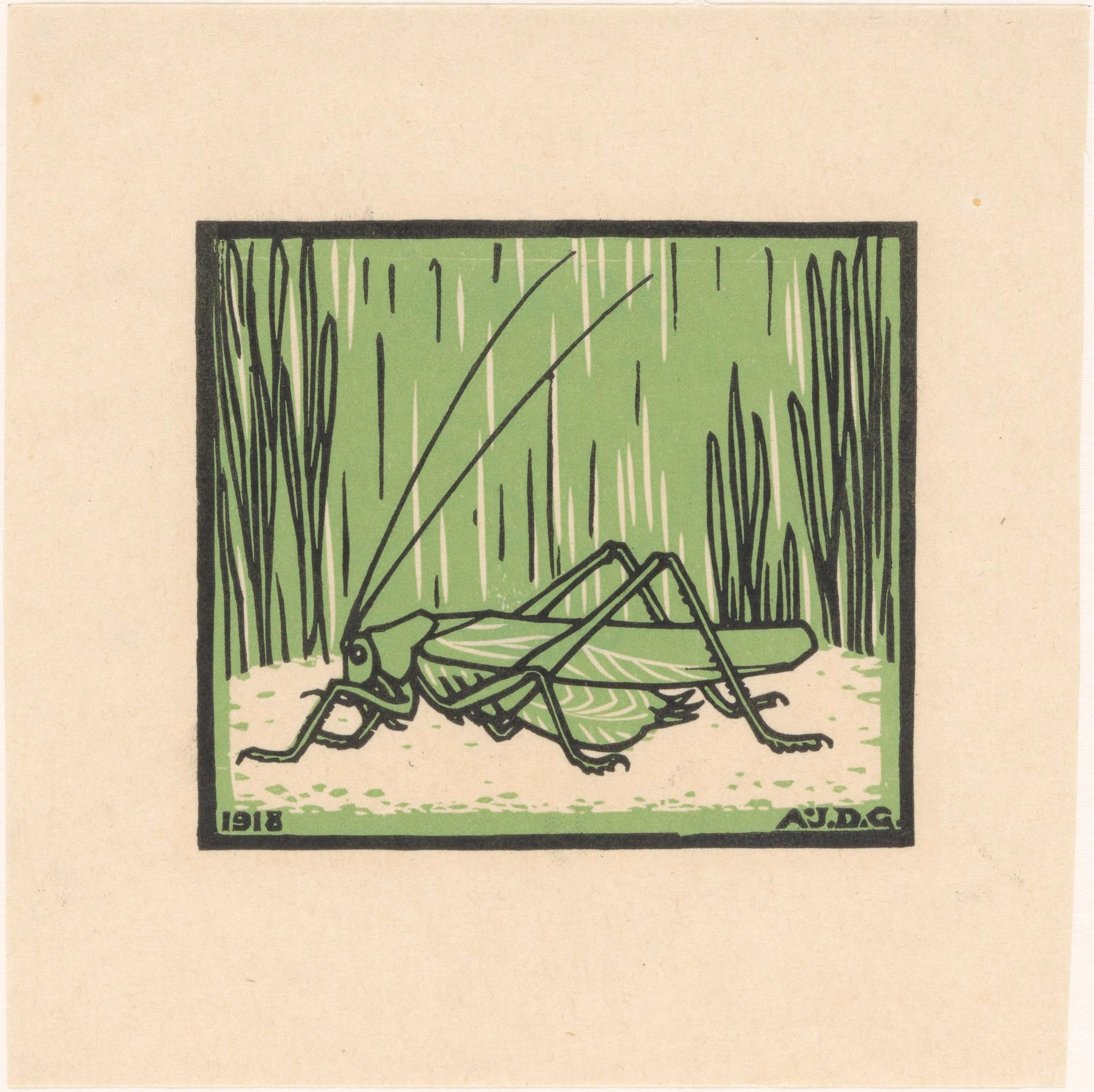
Grasshopper (1918)

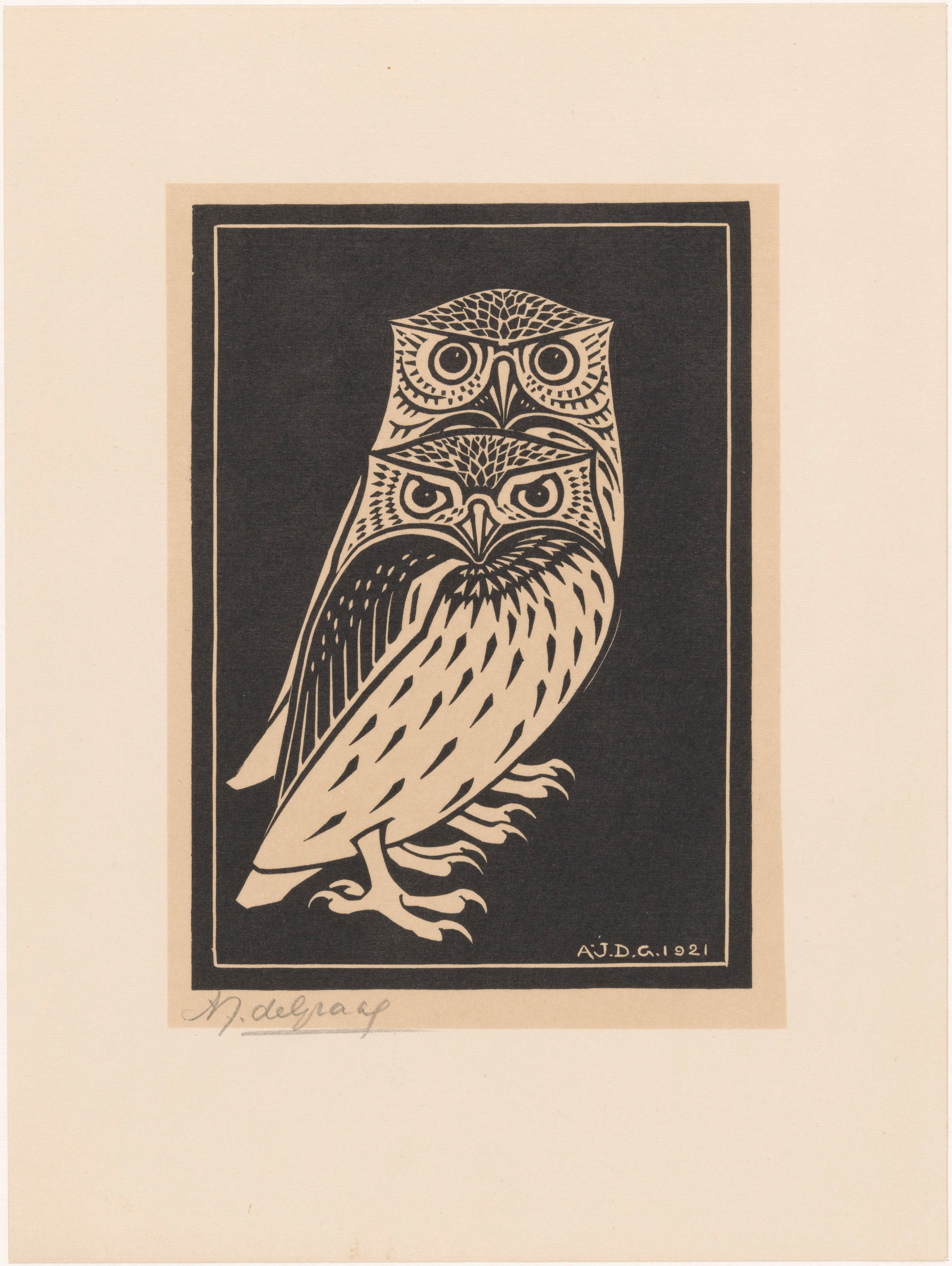
Two owls

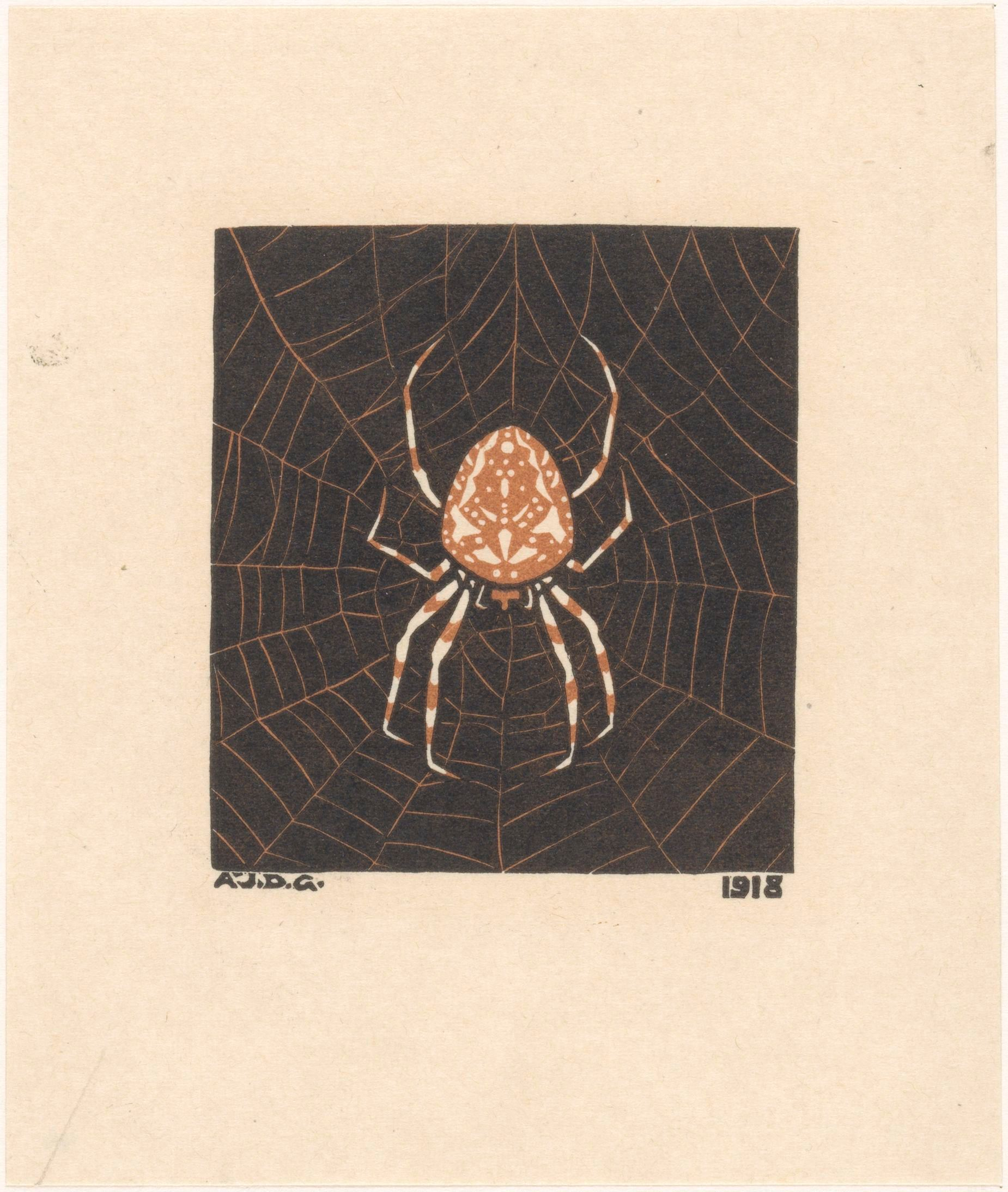
Spider in a web (1918)

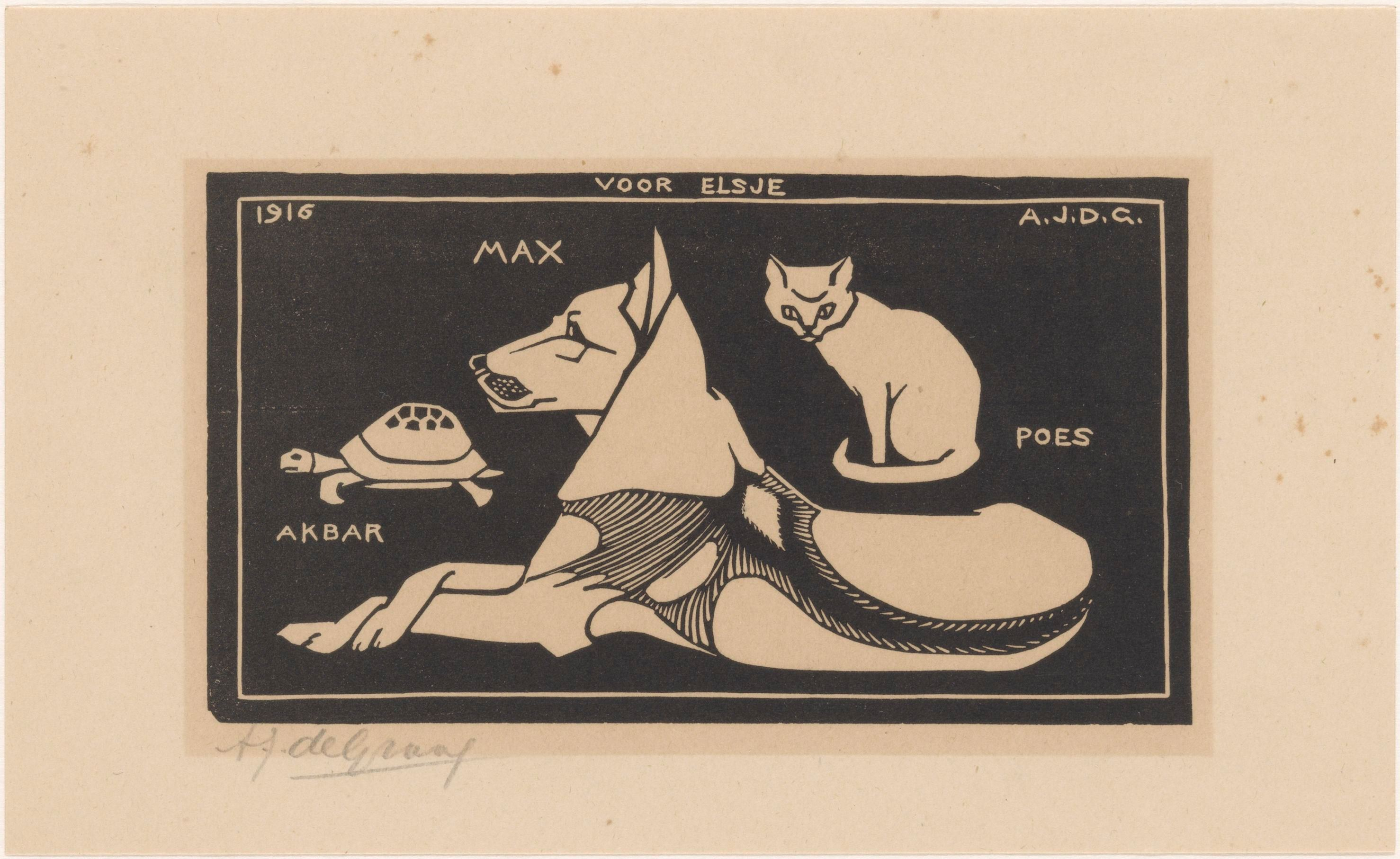
Akbar, Max, Poes

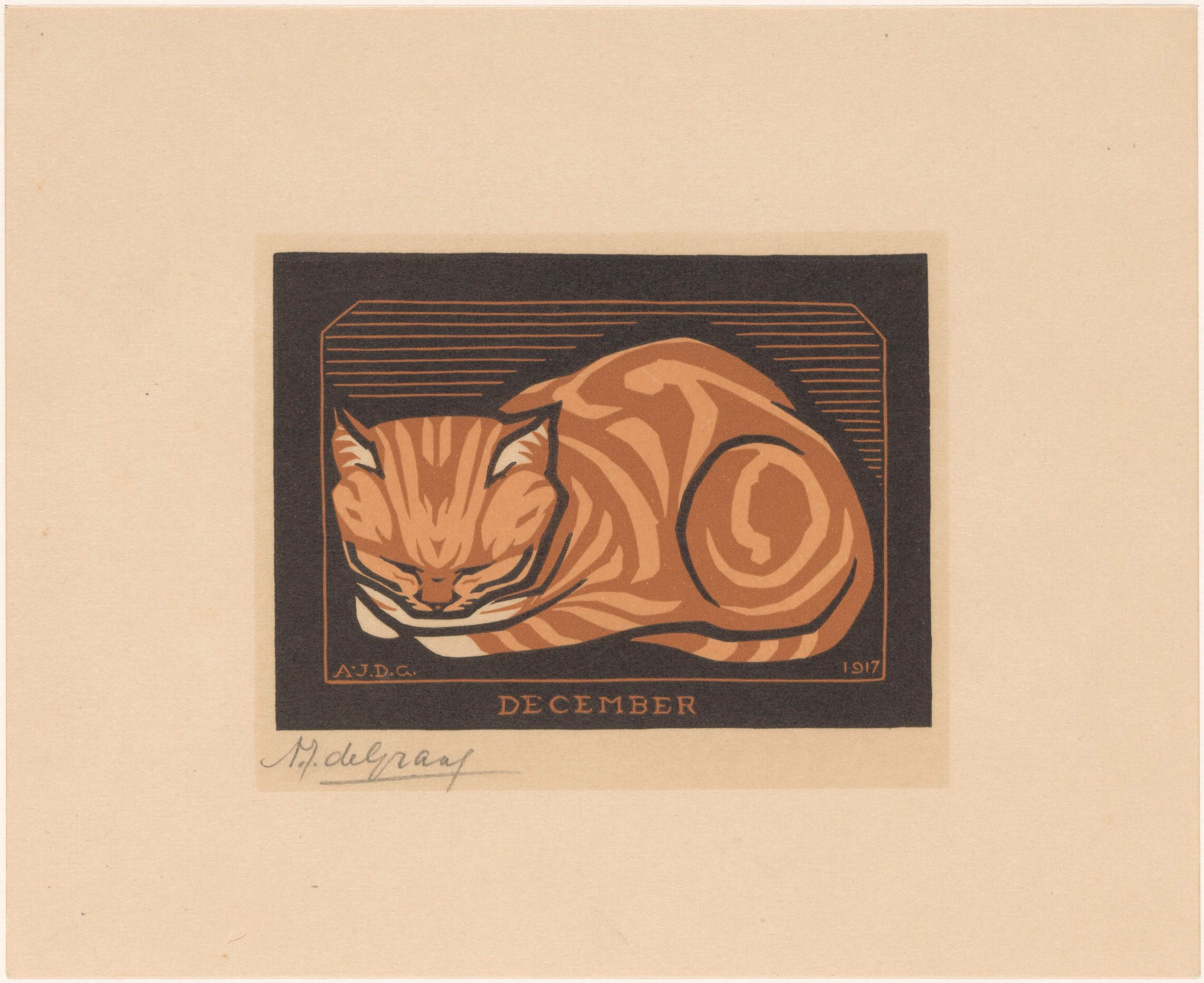
December (1917)

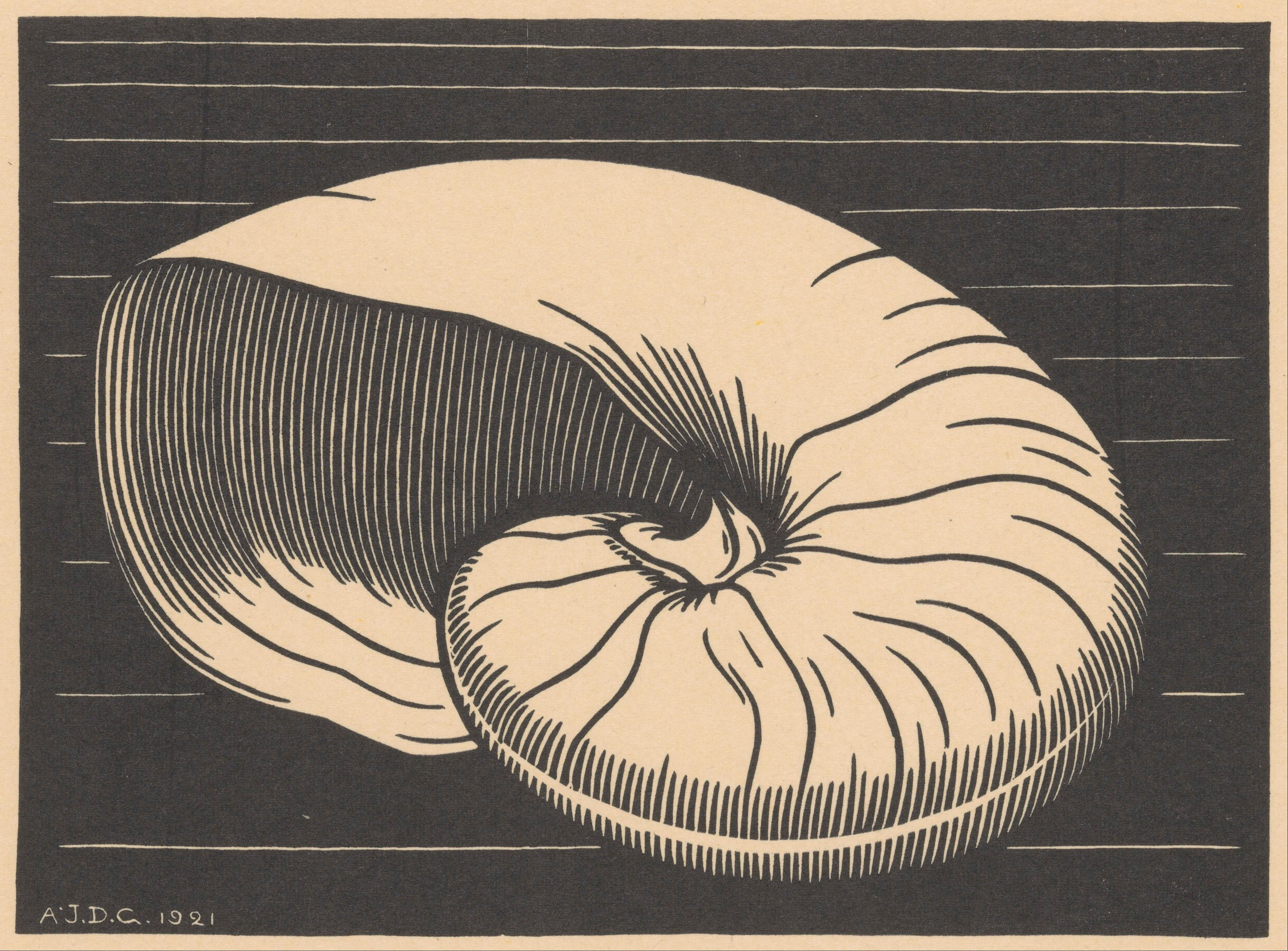
Shell (1921)

=== Flowers and plants ===
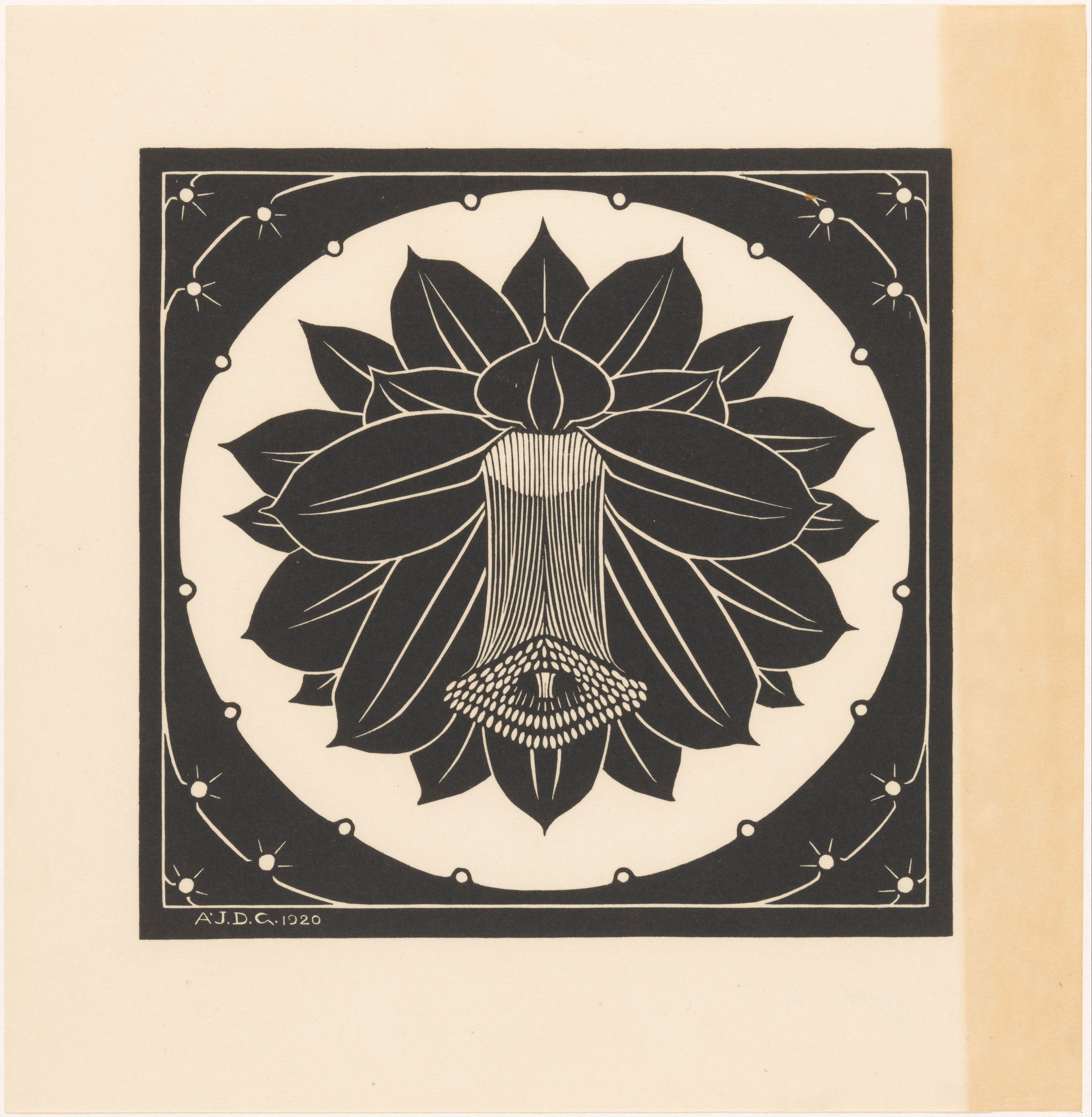
Flower

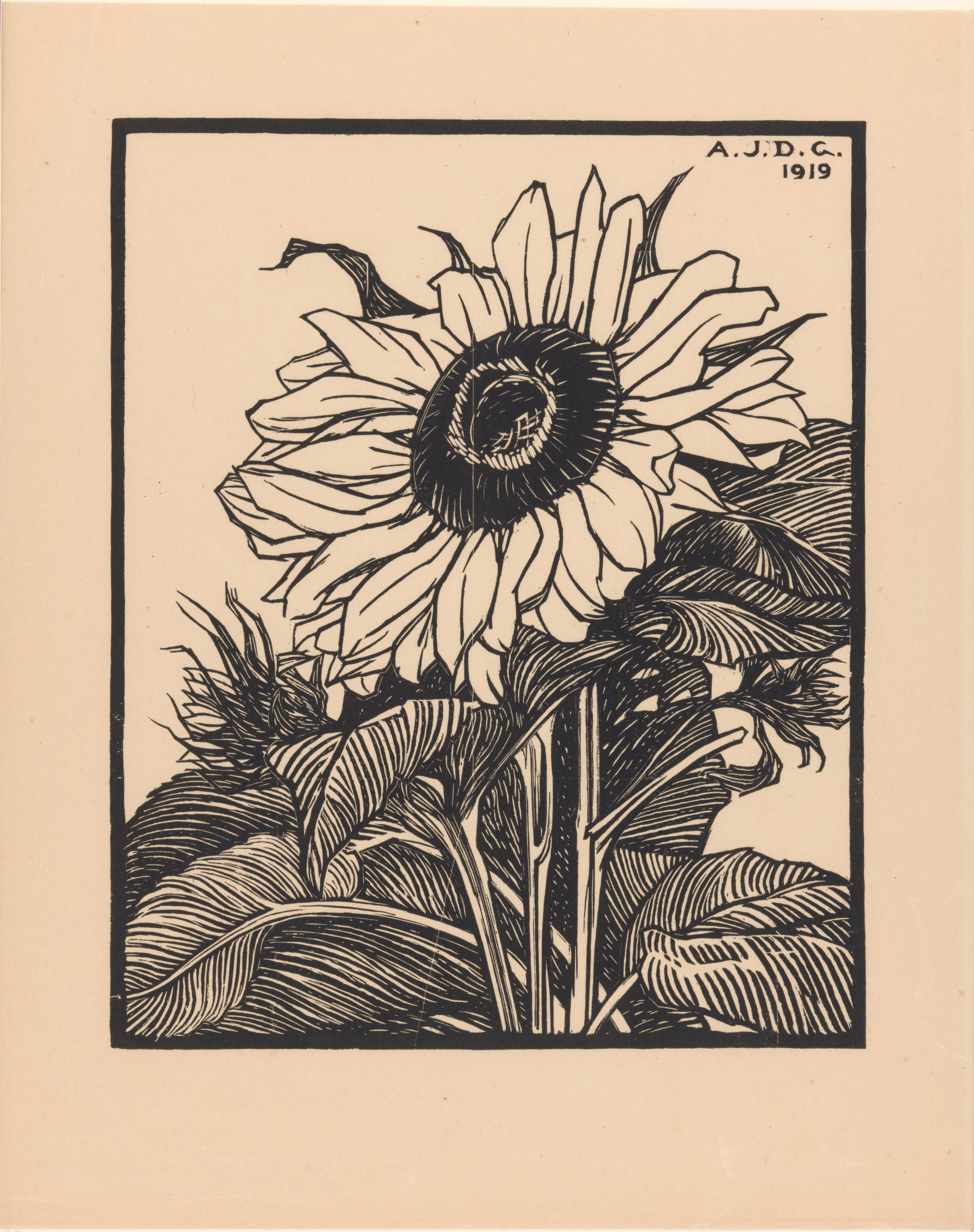
Sunflower (1919)

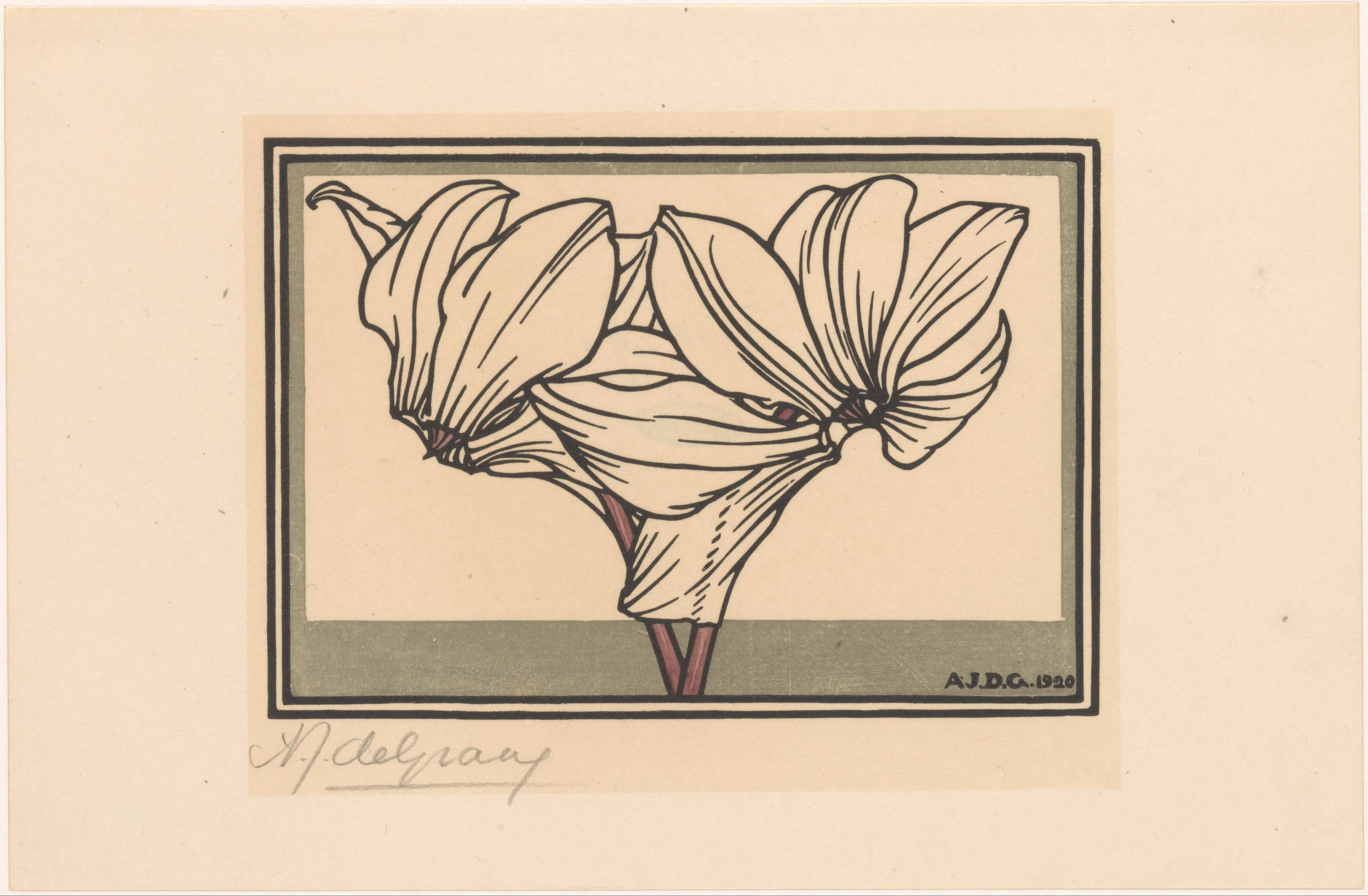
Cyclamen (1920)

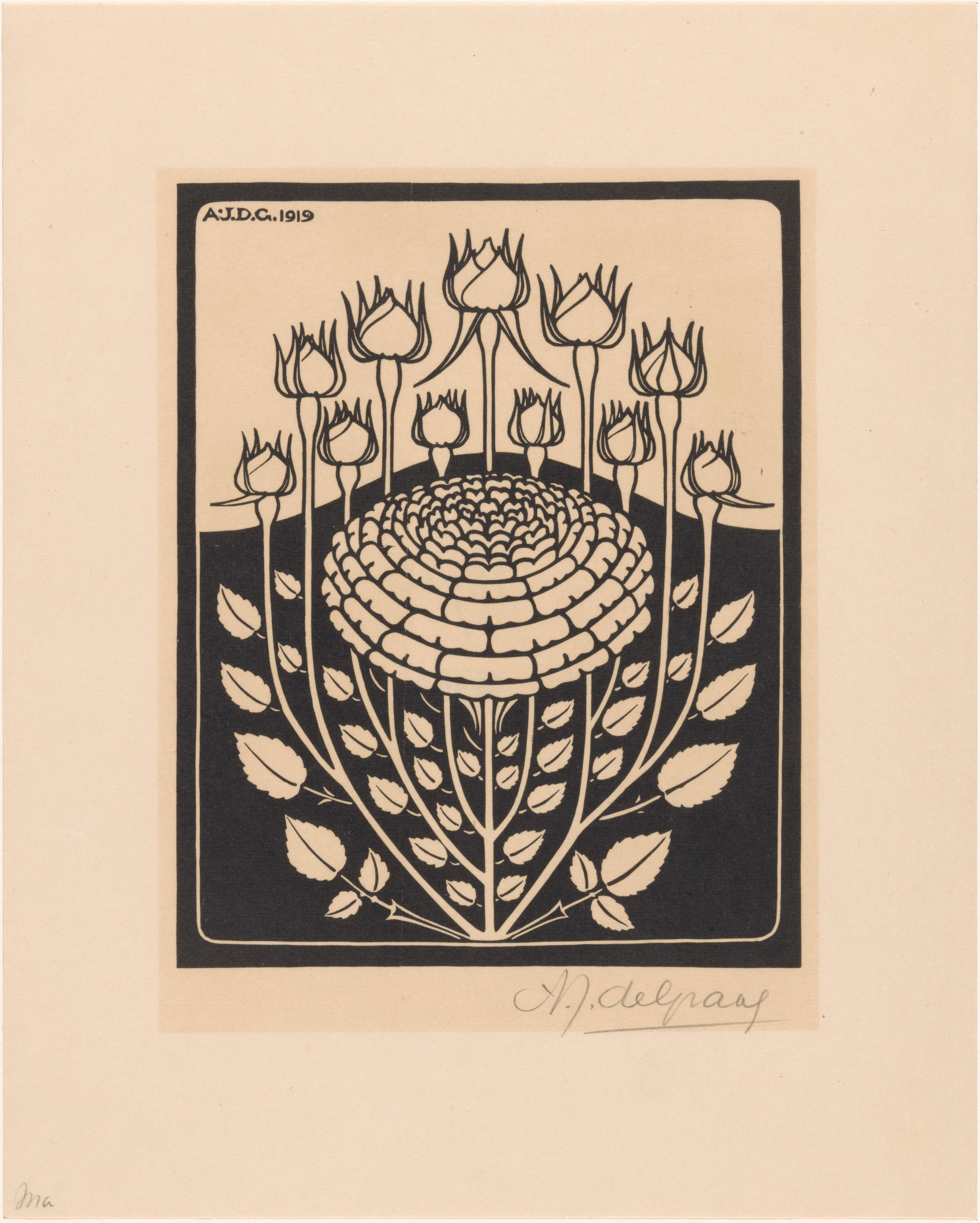
Rose bush

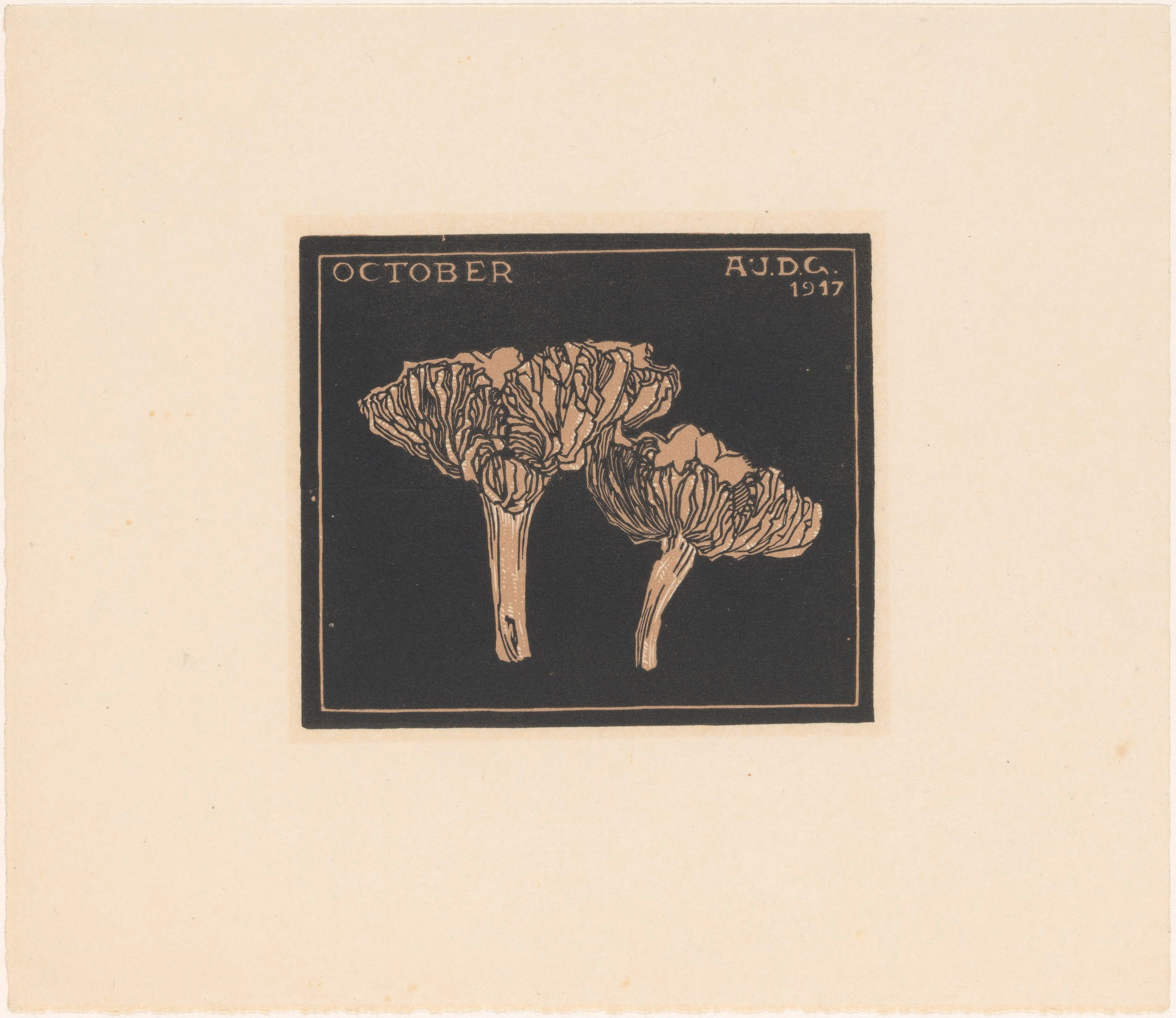
October (1917)

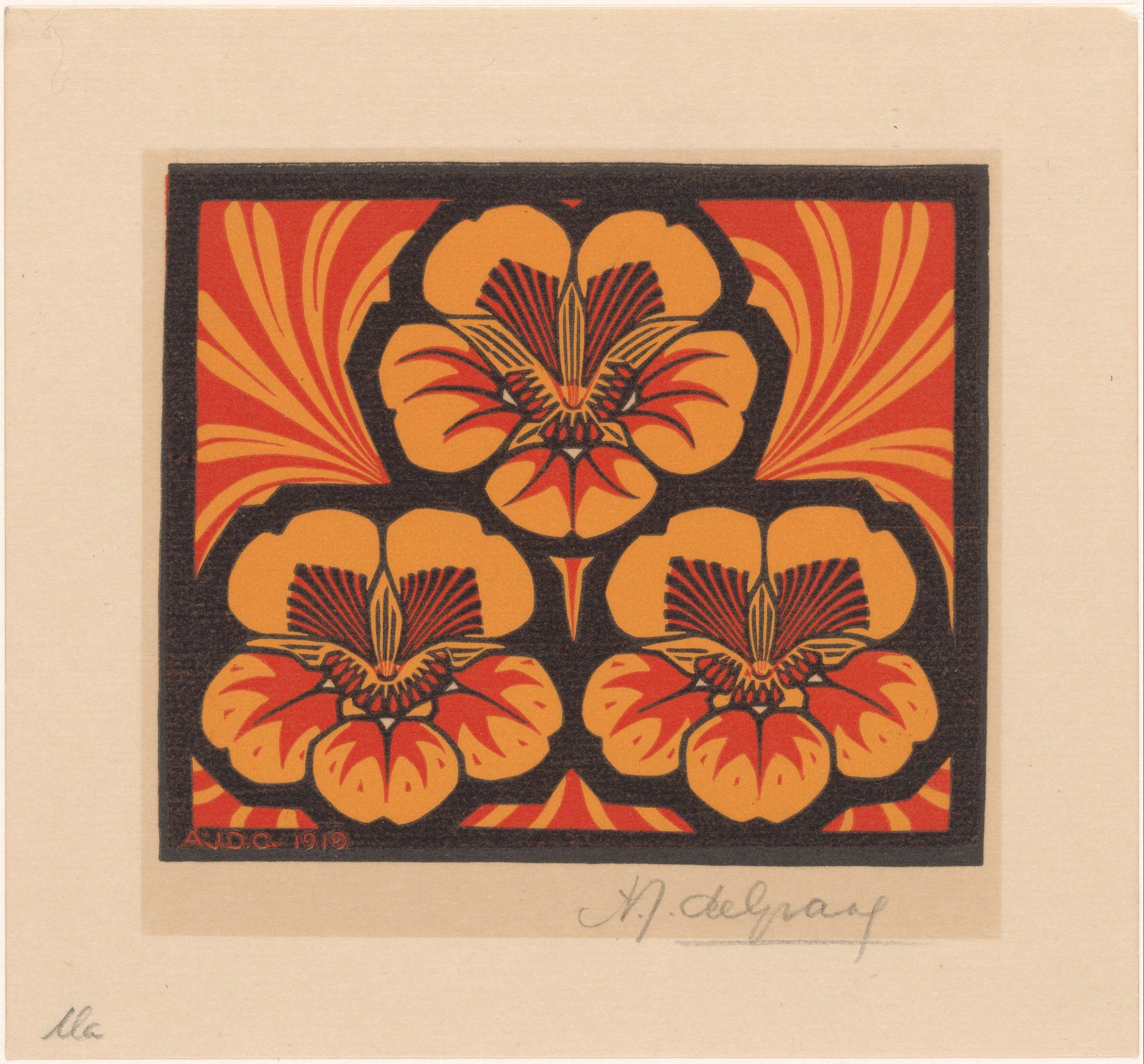
East Indian cherry (1919)

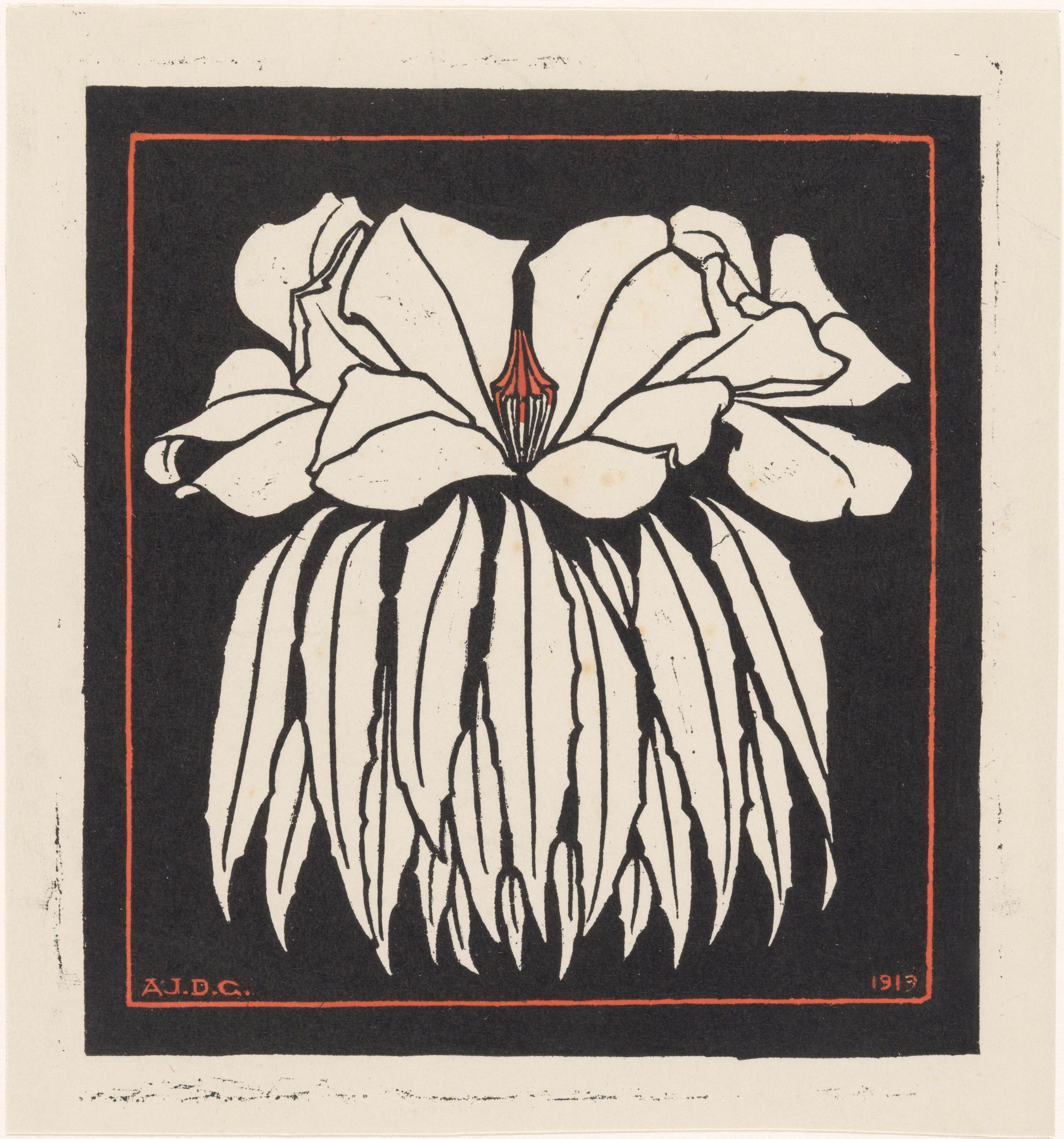
Godetia (1919)

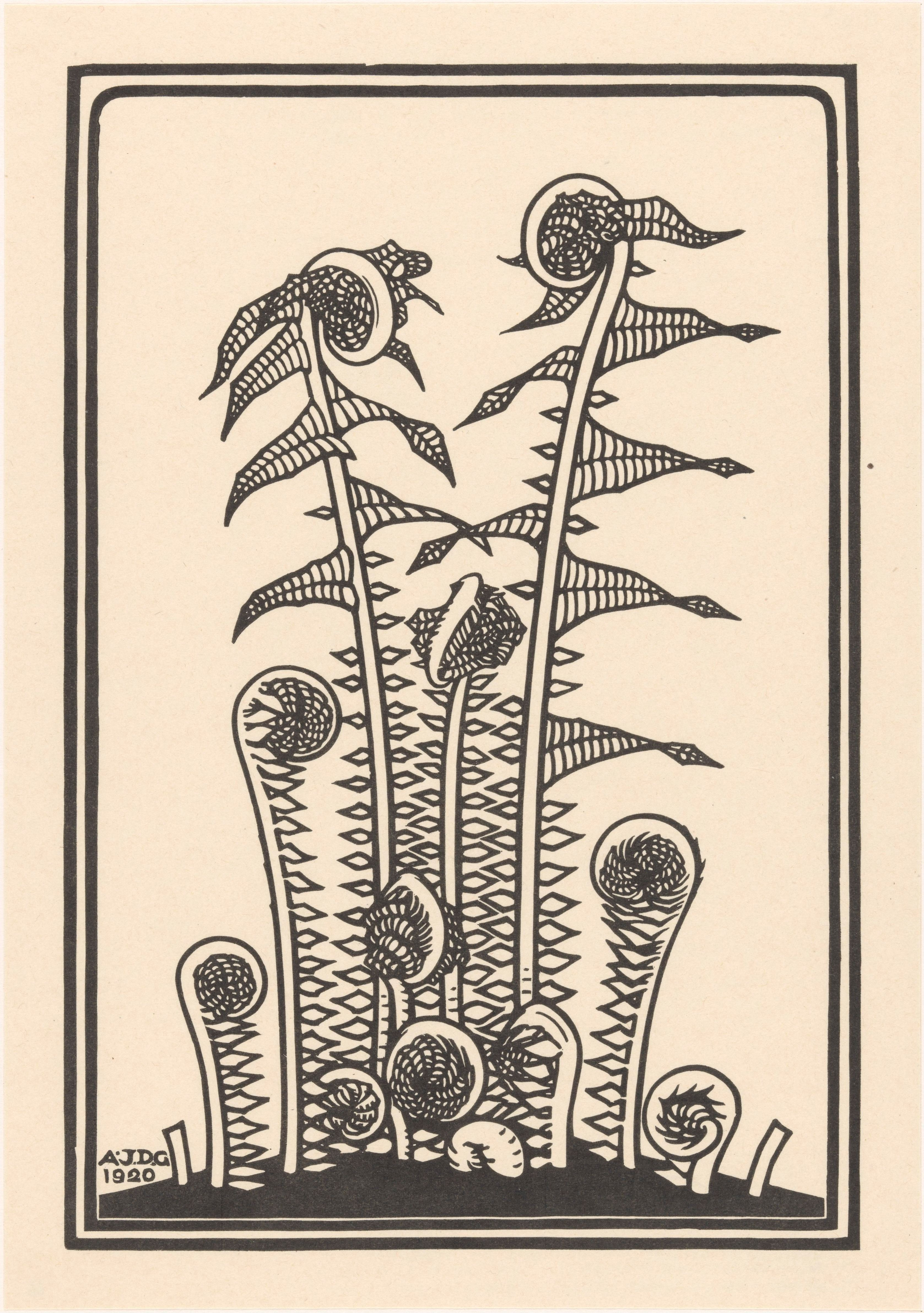
Fern (1920)

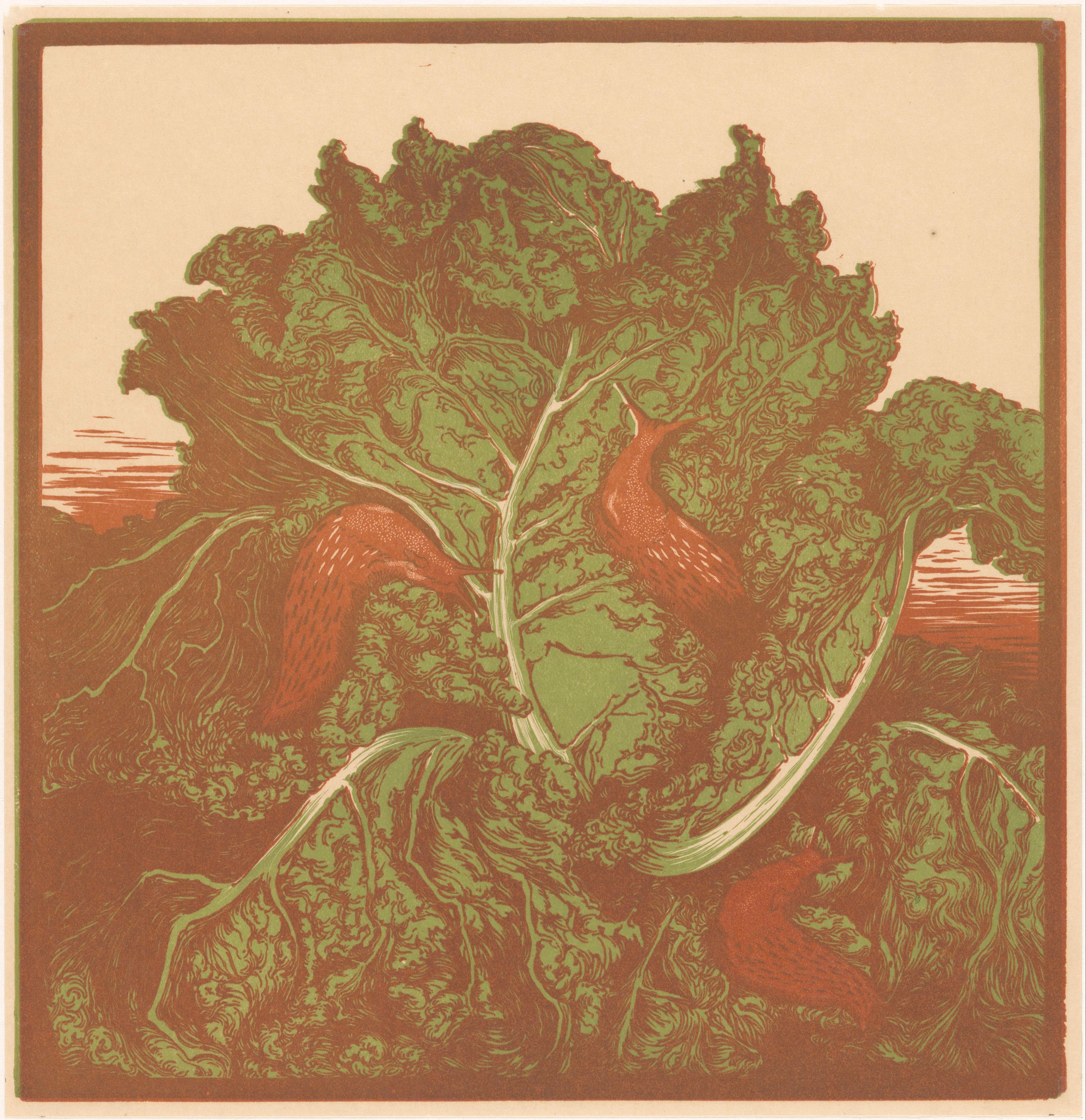
Three slugs on a cabbage

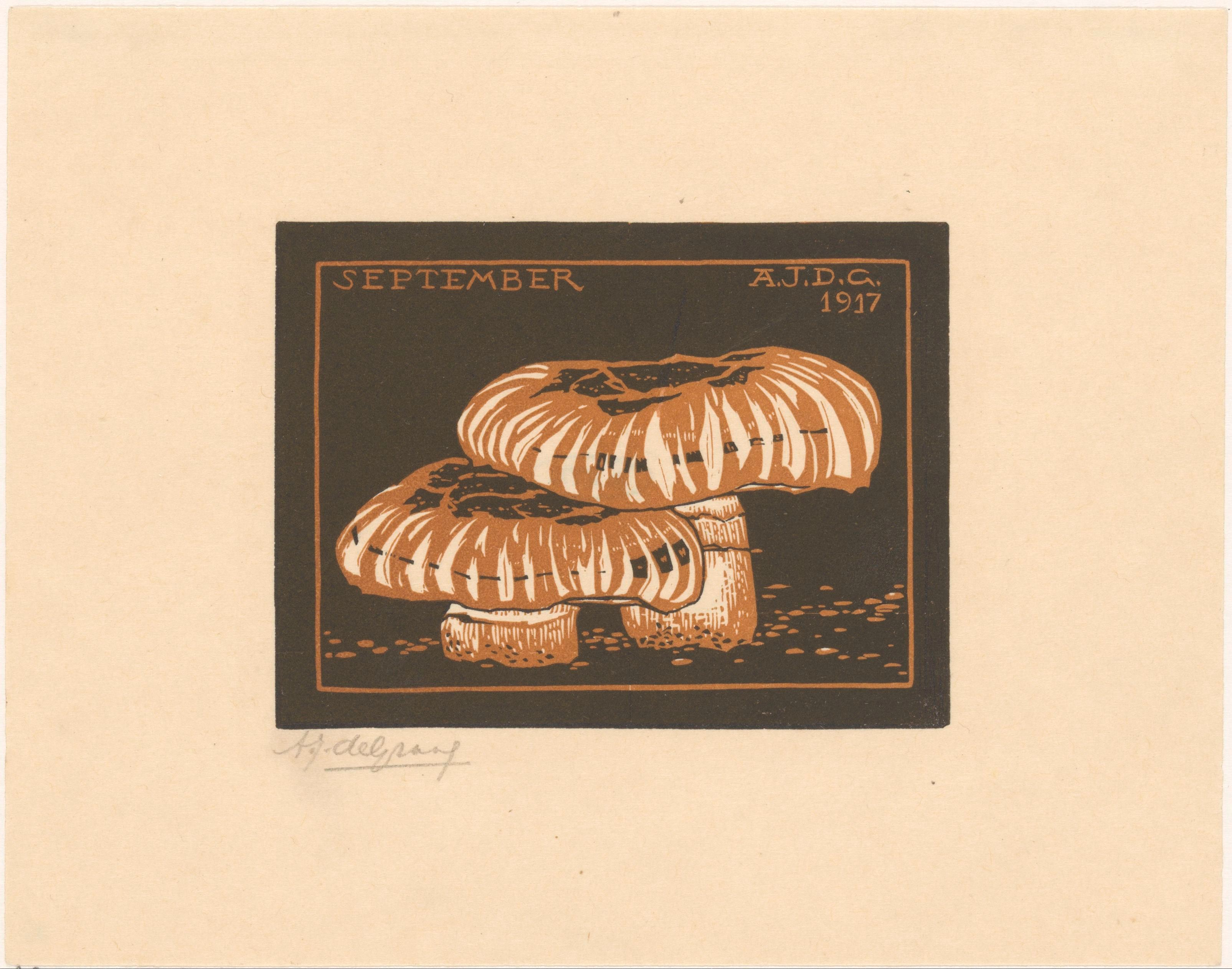
September (1917)

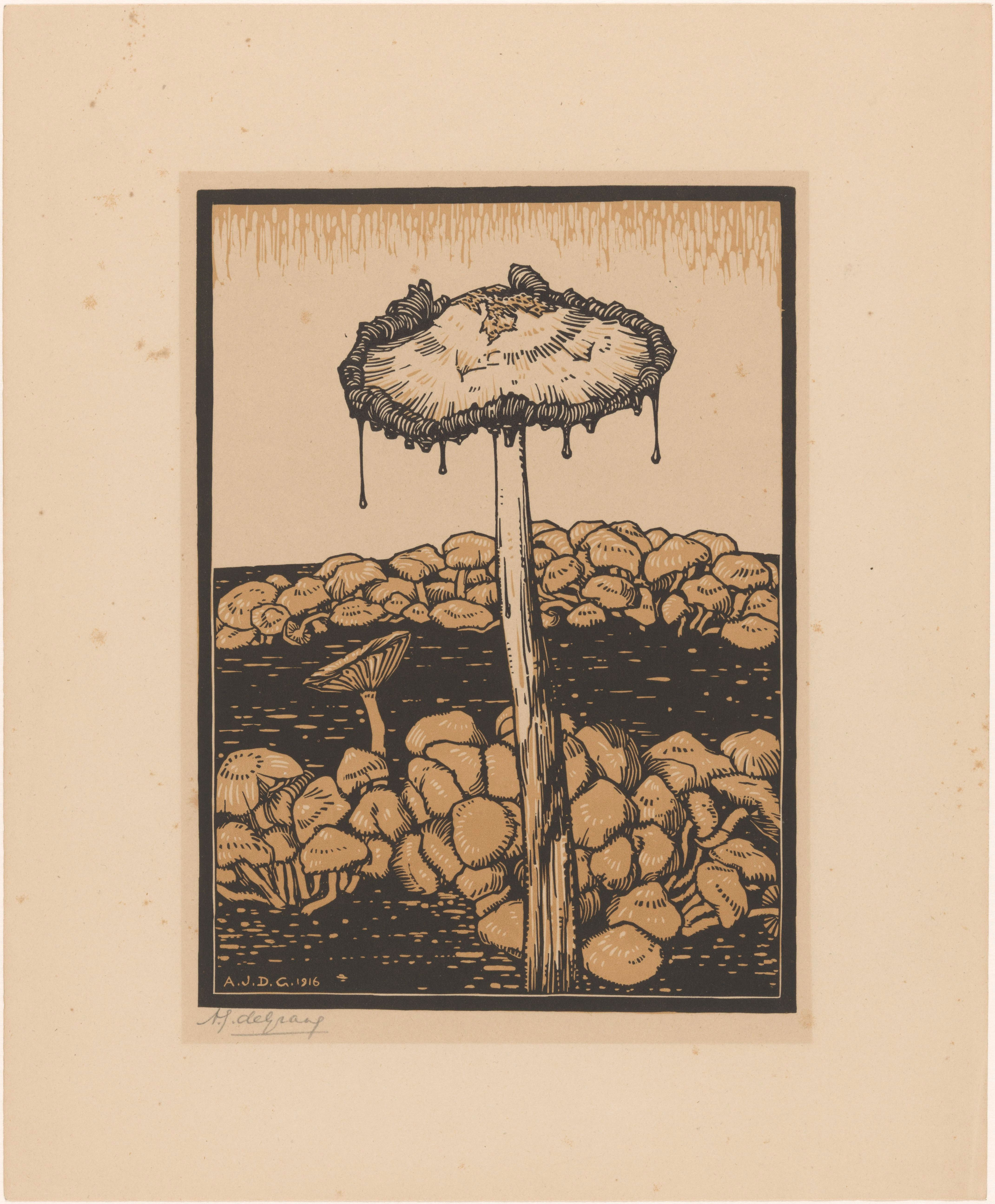
Dripping mushroom (1916)

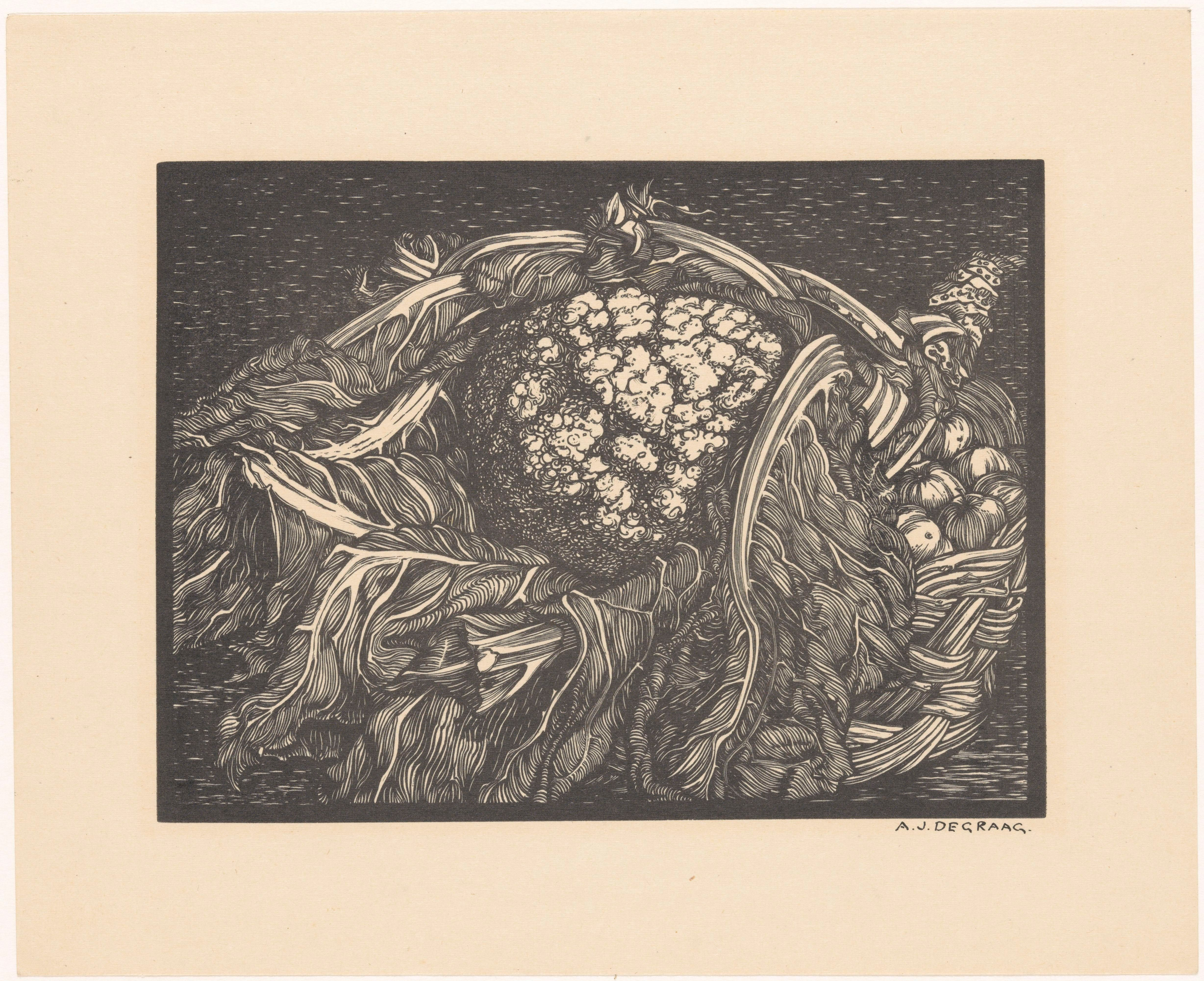
Cauliflower

=== Landscapes ===
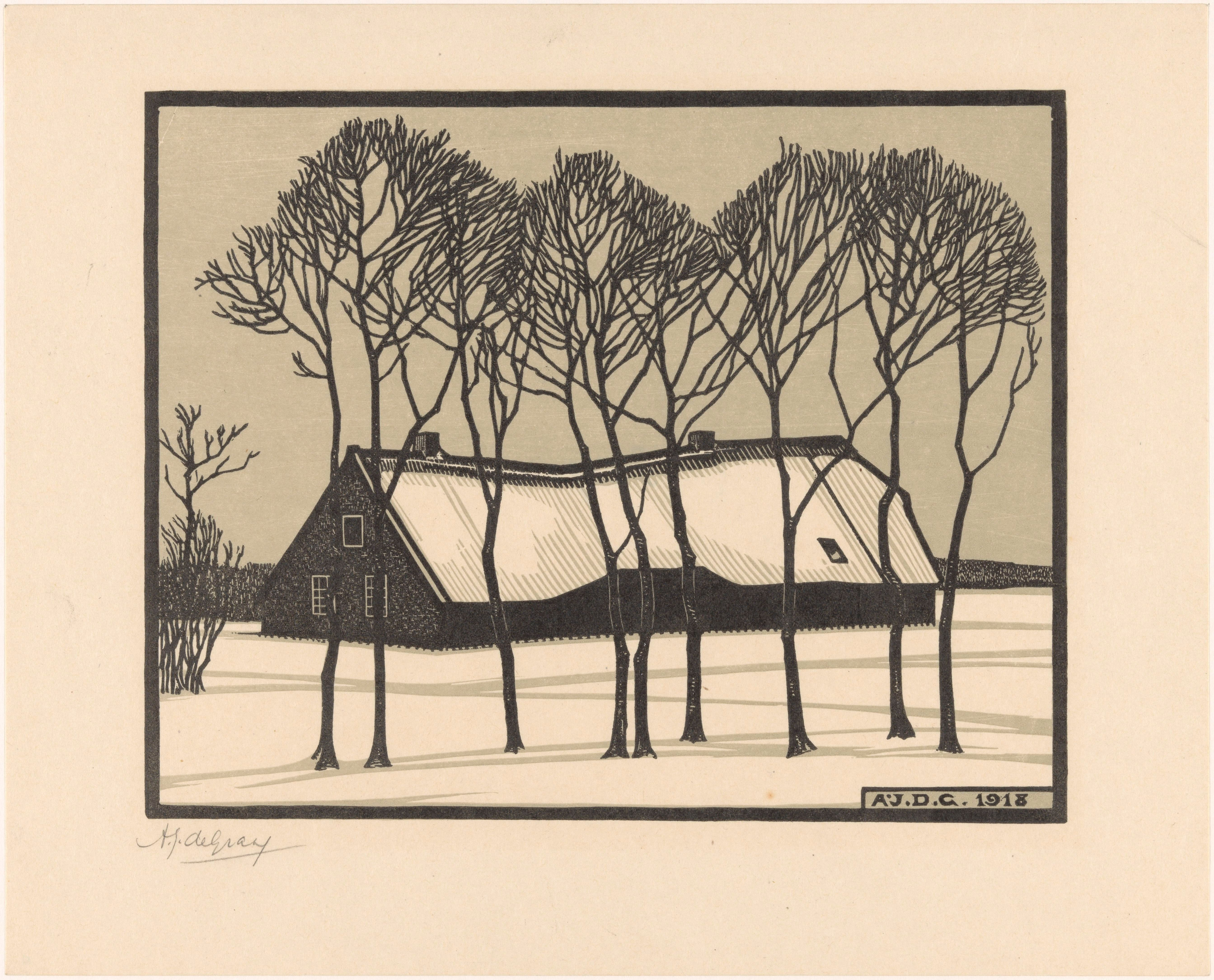
Farm in the snow (1918)

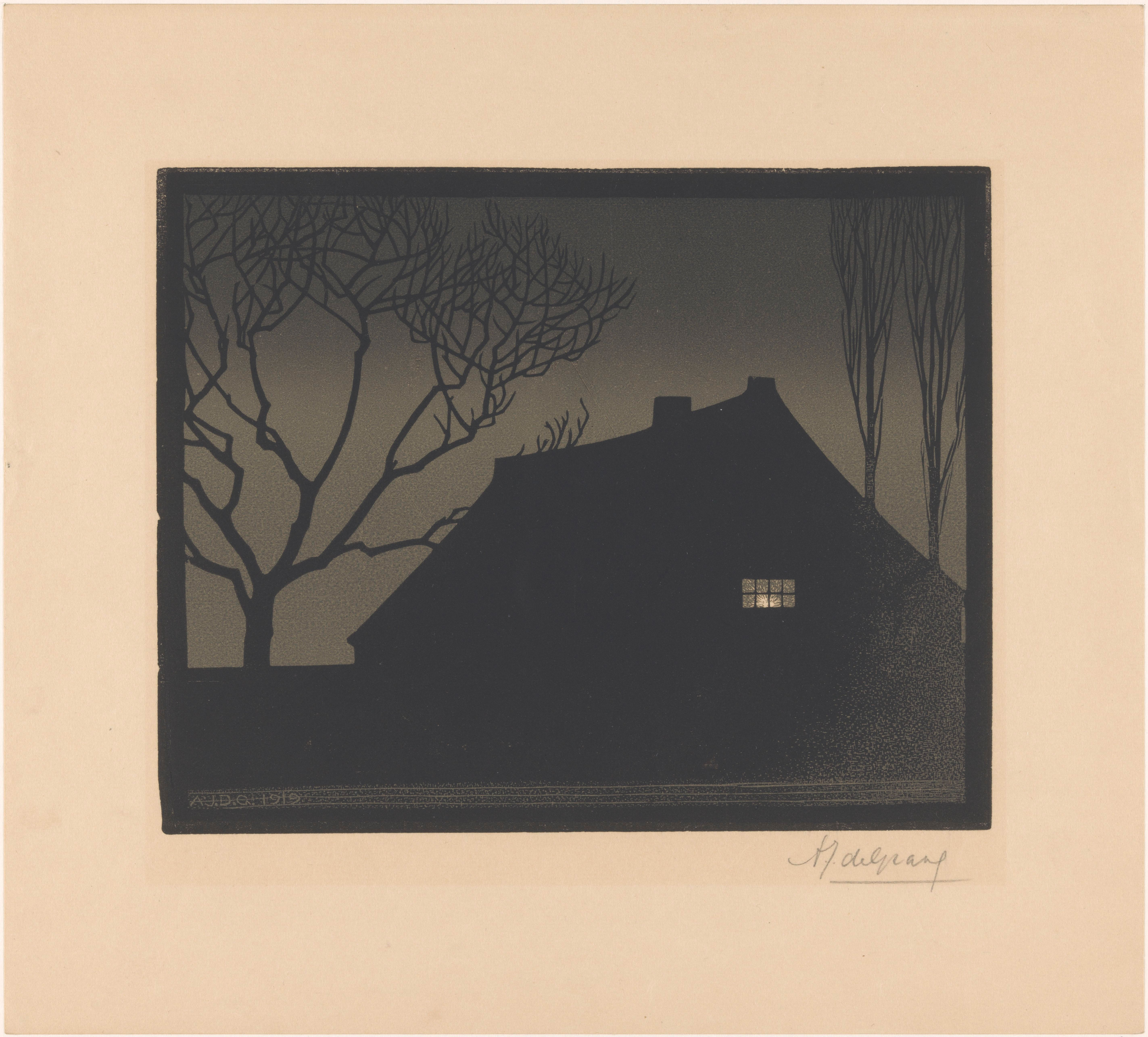
Winter evening (1919)

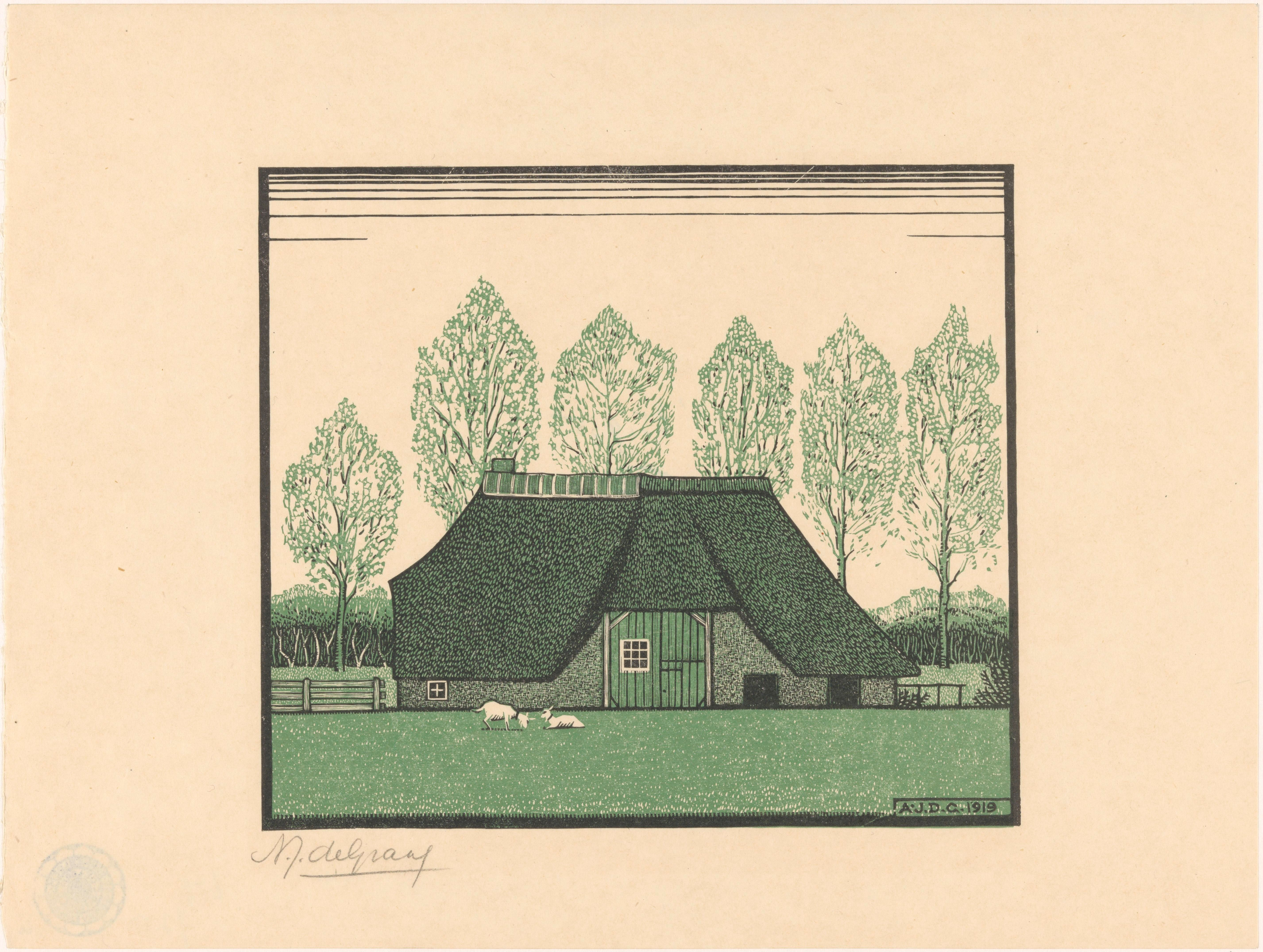
A thatched farm (1919)

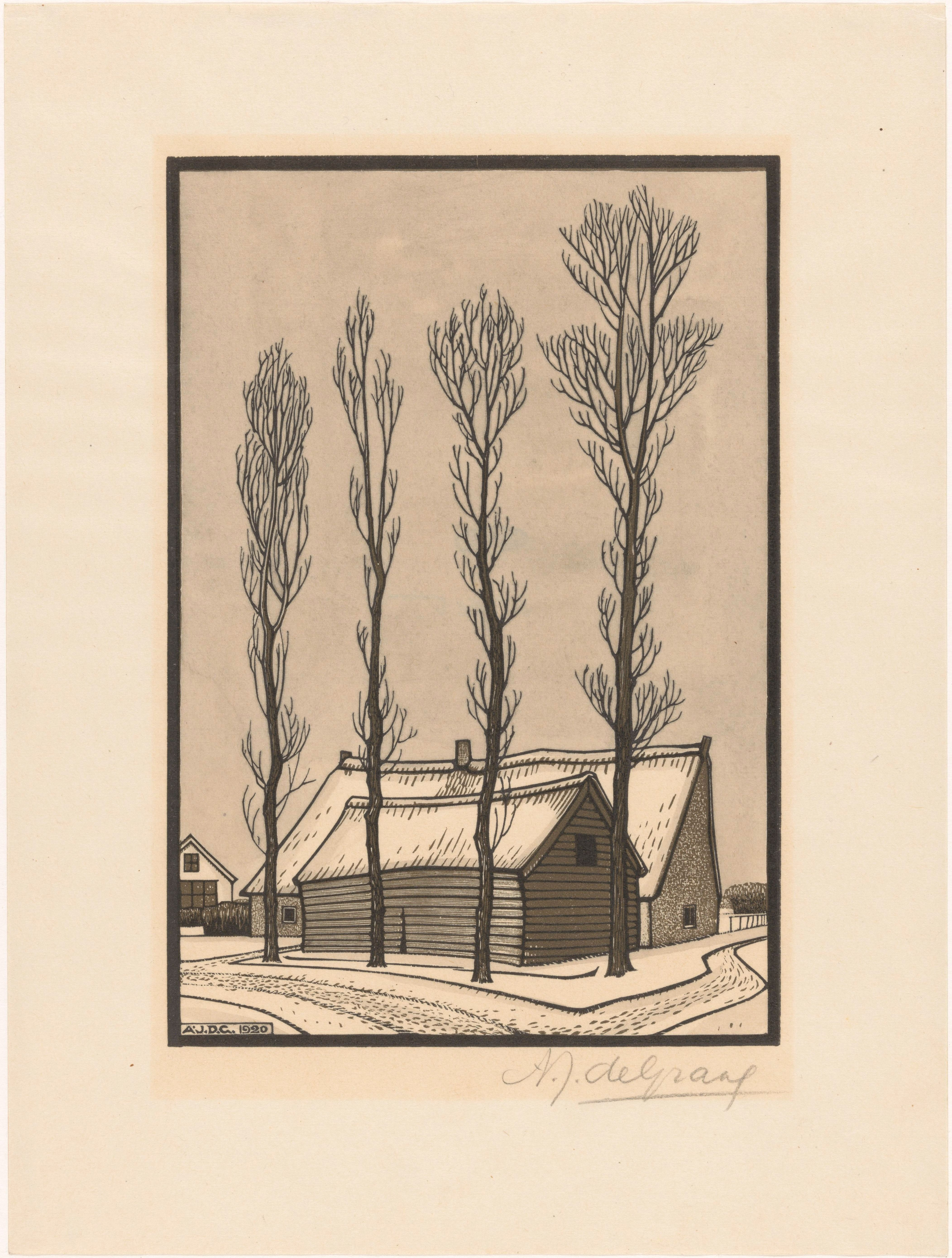
Winter (1920)

== Literature ==
- Hinrichs, Jan Paul (2024). Bremmerianen. Julie de Graag en haar kring: tien kunstenaressen in Den Haag en Laren [The Bremmerians. Julie de Graag and Her Circle: Ten Female Artists in The Hague and Laren] (in Dutch). Leiden: Fragment.
- Hinrichs, Jan Paul (2026). De guts als metgezel. Julie de Graag 1877–1924 [The Gouge as Companion. Julie de Graag 1877–1924] (in Dutch). 's-Gravenhage: Statenhofpers.
- Graag, Julie de (2026). De houtsneden [The Woodcuts] (eds. Christianne Duchateau & Jaap Schipper) (in Dutch). 's-Gravenhage: Statenhofpers.
